= Draper railway station, Adelaide =

Railway station in Adelaide, South Australia

Draper

General information
- Location: Railway Terrace, Largs North
- Coordinates: 34°48′51″S 138°29′56″E
- Owner: Department for Infrastructure & Transport
- Operator: Adelaide Metro
- Line: Outer Harbor
- Distance: 17.2 km from Adelaide
- Platforms: 2
- Tracks: 2
- Bus routes: 150 (Port Road)

Construction
- Structure type: Ground
- Parking: No
- Cycle facilities: No
- Accessible: Yes

Services
Preceding station	Adelaide Metro	Following station
Largs North towards Adelaide	Outer Harbor line	Taperoo towards Osborne or Outer Harbor
Location

Draper railway station is located on the Outer Harbor line. Situated in the north-western Adelaide suburb of Largs North, it is 17.2 kilometres from Adelaide station.

== History ==
It is unclear when this station opened.

Draper is one of the few stations in Adelaide not named after a current suburb. Draper was a suburb or locality to the north of Largs Bay Estate and south of Taperoo and Osborne, in what is now Largs North. One, as yet, unsourced report suggests Draper was named after a drapery that used to exist nearby (corner of Strathfield Terrace and Victoria Road). In the mid 1980s, the drapery closed and the site has housed a number of different shops since including a pet shop and a fish shop. The shop was recently demolished, to make way for housing.

On 22 August 2024, a 53-year-old man was struck and killed by a northbound train near the station after assaulting staff at a shop and vet on Strathfield Terrace and stealing a packet of sugar. The line was shut down for hours with trains terminating at Glanville and Alberton.

== Services by platform ==
Platform	Lines	Destinations	Notes
1	Outer Harbor	all stops services to Outer Harbor	some peak hour services terminate at Osborne
2	Outer Harbor	all stops services to Adelaide	
