= Port Adelaide railway station =

Railway station in Adelaide, South Australia

Port Adelaide
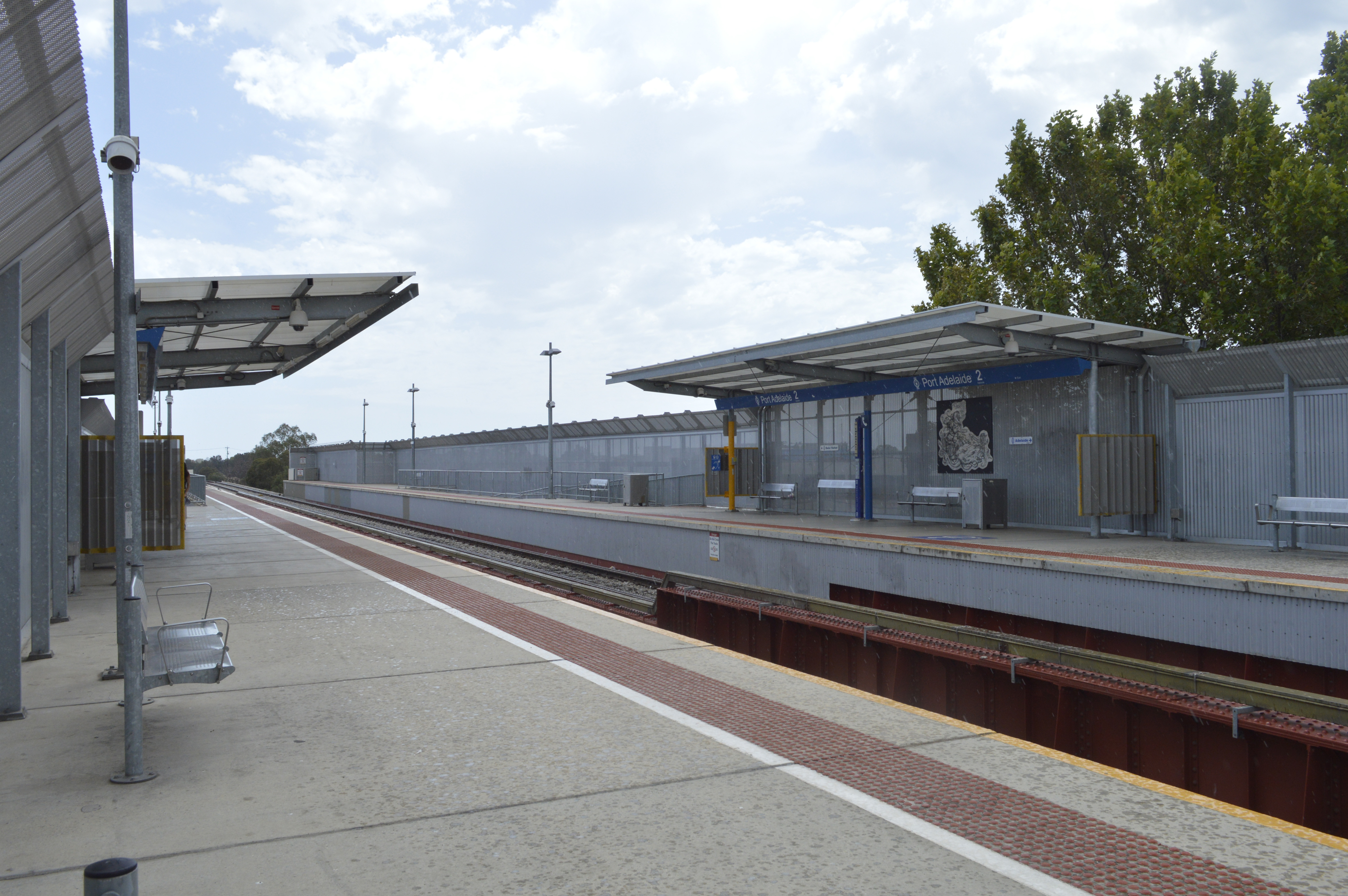
- Eastbound view from Platform 1, December 2018

General information
- Location: Baynes Place, Port Adelaide
- Coordinates: 34°50′57″S 138°30′27″E
- Owner: Department for Infrastructure & Transport
- Operator: Adelaide Metro
- Line: Outer Harbor
- Distance: 11.7 km from Adelaide
- Platforms: 2
- Tracks: 2
- Connections: Bus

Construction
- Structure type: Elevated; side platforms
- Parking: Yes
- Cycle facilities: No
- Accessible: Yes

Other information
- Station code: 18465 (To Outer Harbor); 16578 (To City)
- Website: Adelaide Metro

History
- Opened: 1916
- Rebuilt: 1971 & 2010

Services
Preceding station	Adelaide Metro	Following station
Alberton towards Adelaide	Outer Harbor line	Ethelton towards Osborne or Outer Harbor
Location

Port Adelaide railway station is a commuter railway station located on the Outer Harbor line. It serves the port-side region of Port Adelaide. It originally opened as Commercial Road, the current name of Port Adelaide was given in 1981. Situated in the north-western Adelaide suburb of Alberton, it is 11.7 kilometres from Adelaide station.

== History ==
The line from Adelaide to Port Adelaide was the second railway in South Australia (after the Goolwa-Port Elliot railway began in 1854) and opened in 1856. The original line from Adelaide ran directly to Port Dock station, the site now occupied by the National Railway Museum. Various lines then continued through the Port Adelaide's streets to the wharves and, from 1878, along St Vincent Street to the seaside town of Semaphore.

Congestion at Port Dock railway station and the delays involved in operating trains along busy streets in the centre of the Port resulted in construction of a viaduct and a new bridge across the Port River in 1916. This diverted through trains to Semaphore and Outer Harbor via a new station named Commercial Road, the current station. Port Adelaide Commercial Road was quite a substantial building, with long platforms, an overall roof and a signal cabin. This quickly took over from Port Dock as the town's principal railway station.

As rail traffic decreased through the 1960s and 70s, facilities at Commercial Road station were gradually reduced. In the early 1970s the roof was removed, platforms shortened and the street level station buildings reconstructed. The ticket office closed in January 1979 and the station has been unstaffed since then. With the closure of Port Dock station in 1981, Commercial Road station was subsequently renamed Port Adelaide. In November 2009, the station and viaduct closed for refurbishment, reopening on 9 May 2010. Currently, Port Adelaide station's two elevated platforms are on a viaduct that carries the railway across Commercial Road. The station is unstaffed and has no buildings or other facilities except basic passenger shelters on each platform.

The tracks through Port Adelaide station were dual gauge from 1982, both 5 ft 3 in (1,600 mm) broad gauge and 4 ft 8 1/2 in (1,435 mm) standard gauge. This allowed freight traffic from Dry Creek via the Rosewater loop to access industrial facilities on the Lefevre Peninsula and the container terminal at Pelican Point. In August 2008, freight traffic was diverted to operate via the Mary MacKillop Bridge downstream of the Port Adelaide harbour. The disused standard gauge rails have been removed, however the dual gauge sleepers remain in place to allow for the entire Outer Harbor line to be gauge converted in the future.

== Services by platform ==
Platform	Lines	Destinations	Notes
1	Outer Harbor	all stops services to Outer Harbor	some peak hour services terminate at Osborne
2	Outer Harbor	all stops services to Adelaide	

== Transport links ==
Bus transfers: Stop 38 (Commercial Road)
Route no.	Destination & route details
118	City via Old Port Road, Tapleys Hill Road, Trimmer Parade, Crittenden Road, Grange Road & Port Road
150	City via Port Road
150	Osborne via Fletcher Road, Carnarvon Terrace & Victoria Road
230	City via Addison Road, Armada Arndale & Torrens Road
232	City via Newcastle Street, Centro Arndale & Torrens Road
254	City via Grand Junction Road, Hanson Road, Arndale Central & Hawker Street (254X does not stop between Arndale & North Adelaide)
361	Tea Tree Plaza Interchange via Grand Junction Road, Helen Terrace & Wright Road
