= Peterhead railway station, Adelaide =

Railway station in Adelaide, South Australia

Peterhead
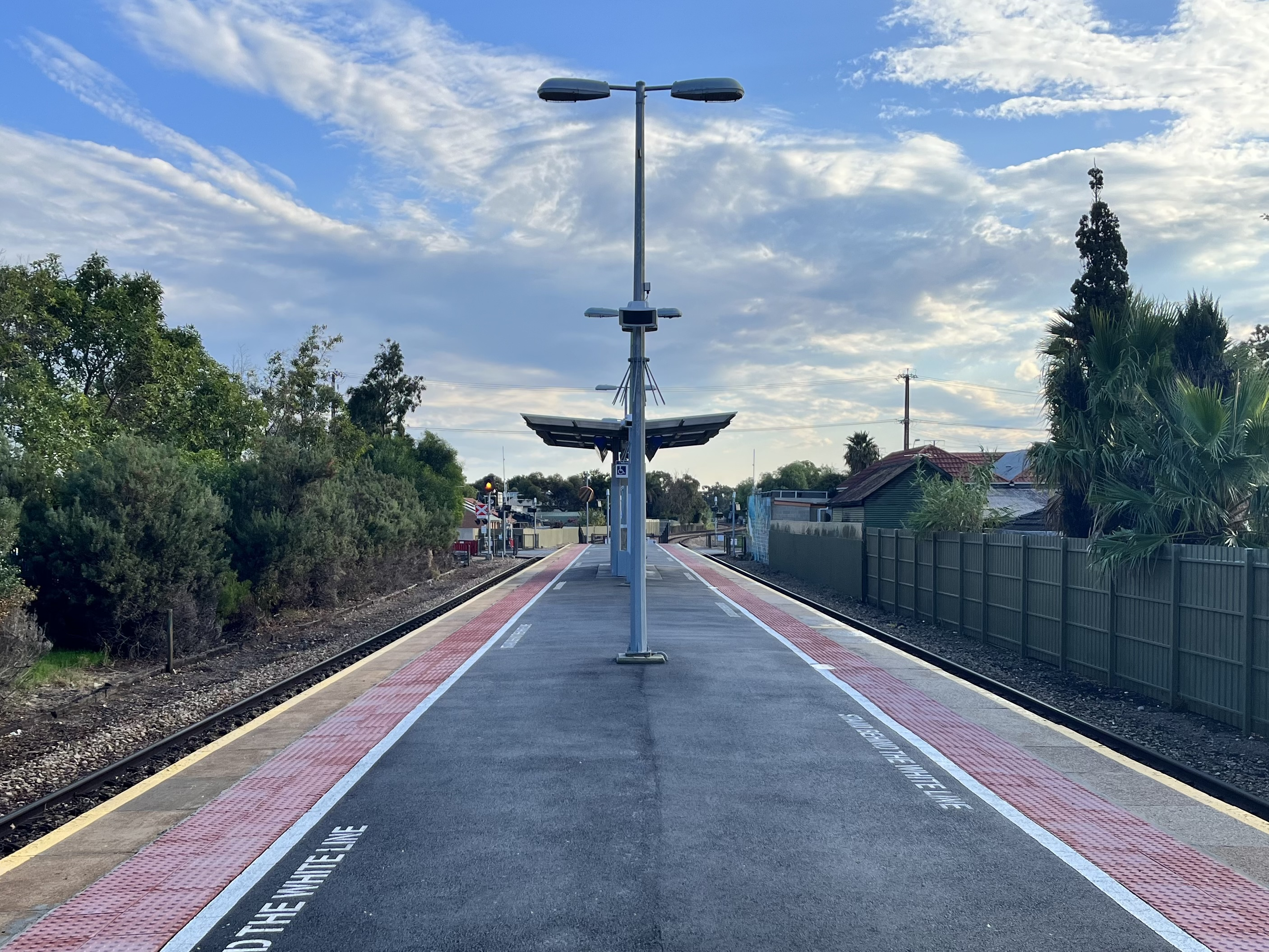
- Northbound view from both platforms, June 2023

General information
- Location: Hargrave Street, Peterhead
- Coordinates: 34°50′05″S 138°29′31″E
- Owner: Department for Infrastructure & Transport
- Operator: Adelaide Metro
- Line: Outer Harbor
- Distance: 14.6 km from Adelaide
- Platforms: 2
- Tracks: 2
- Connections: None

Construction
- Structure type: Island platform
- Parking: Yes
- Cycle facilities: No
- Accessible: Yes

Other information
- Station code: 16556 (to City); 18471 (to Outer Harbor)
- Website: Adelaide Metro

History
- Opened: 1911

Services
Preceding station	Adelaide Metro	Following station
Glanville towards Adelaide	Outer Harbor line	Largs towards Osborne or Outer Harbor
Location

Peterhead railway station is located on the Outer Harbor line. Situated in the north-western Adelaide suburb of Peterhead, it is 14.6 kilometres from Adelaide station.

== History ==
Peterhead station opened in 1911, when the line was extended from Glanville to Outer Harbor. In the 1990s, there were moves to curtail the line at Glanville, providing alternate transport beyond there. As a result, a feeder bus was introduced to connect Outer Harbour to the train at Glanville and Ethelton, as well as allowing passengers to travel to Port Adelaide, Semaphore (which used to have its own branch from the main line) and West Lakes. That was later split into two routes, one staying west near Military Road, and the other servicing the eastern side of the Lefevre Peninsula along Fletcher and Victoria Roads. The plans to close the line were later scrapped, although the nearby 333 and 150 routes are a remnant of these original plans.

In late 2016, the station was ranked as one of the worst in the western suburbs, based on five criteria and, like many other old western and northern suburbs stations, it is subject to vandalism. In 2017, the shelter was replaced at the station, and in 2022, the station platform was resurfaced and tactile paving installed on the platform edges.

In July 2018, several signal cabinets next to the level crossing were painted with an ocean theme, along with a quotation from Jules Verne. A mural with an octopus and submarine followed in September.

== Services by platform ==
Platform	Lines	Destinations	Notes
1	Outer Harbor	all stops services to Outer Harbor	some peak hour services terminate at Osborne
2	Outer Harbor	all stops services to Adelaide	
