= Ethelton railway station =

Railway station in Adelaide, South Australia

Coordinates: 34°50′55″S 138°29′42″E

Ethelton
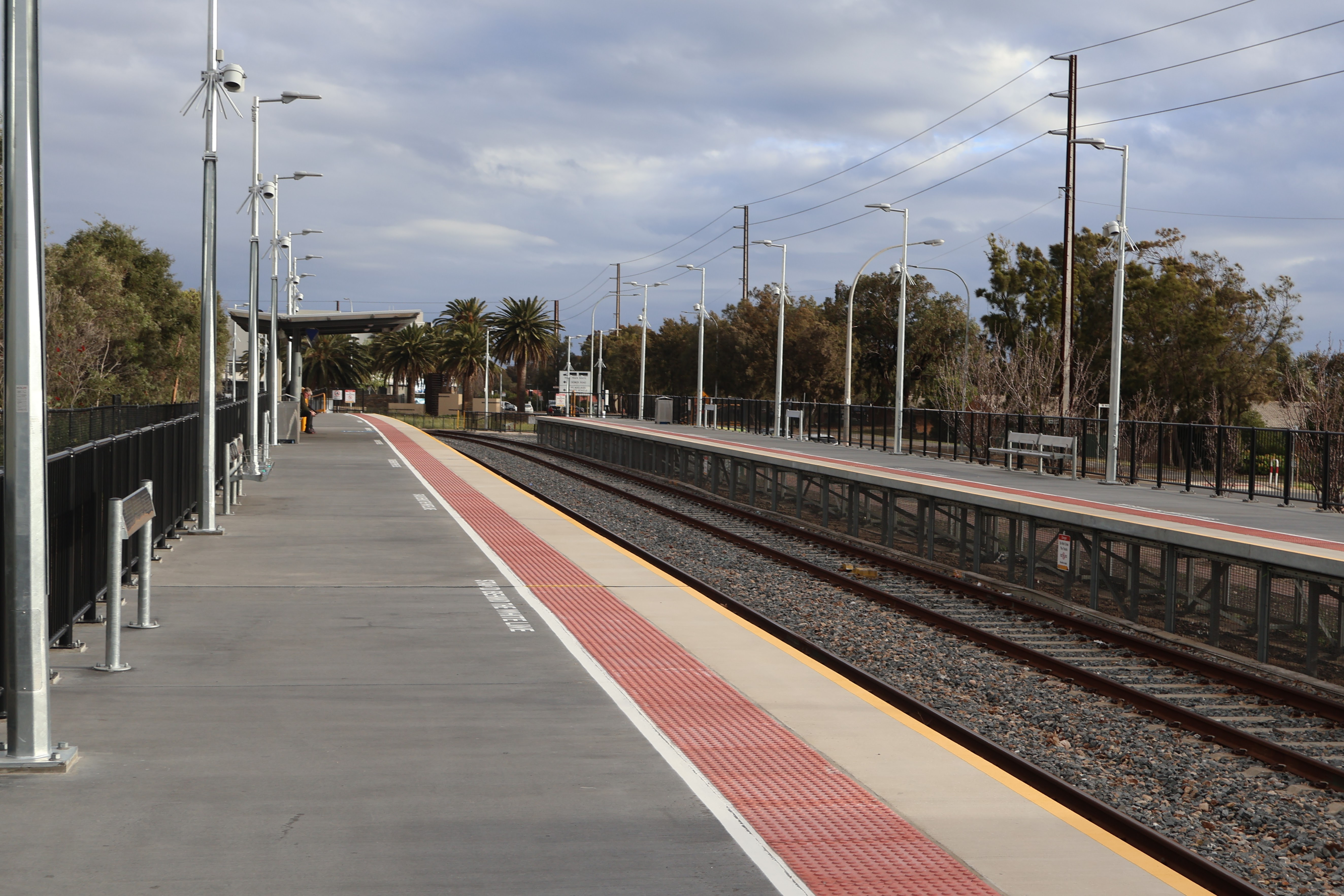
- The upgraded Ethelton railway station in October 2025

General information
- Location: Causeway Road, Ethelton
- Owner: Department for Infrastructure & Transport
- Operator: Adelaide Metro
- Line: Outer Harbor
- Distance: 13.1 km from Adelaide
- Platforms: 2
- Tracks: 2
- Connections: None

Construction
- Structure type: Side platform
- Parking: Yes
- Cycle facilities: Yes
- Accessible: Yes

History
- Opened: 1916
- Closed: 30 June 2024
- Rebuilt: 3 November 2024

Services
Preceding station	Adelaide Metro	Following station
Port Adelaide towards Adelaide	Outer Harbor line	Glanville towards Osborne or Outer Harbor
Location

Ethelton station is located on the Outer Harbor line. Situated in the north-western Adelaide suburb of Ethelton, it is 13.1 kilometres from Adelaide station.

== History ==
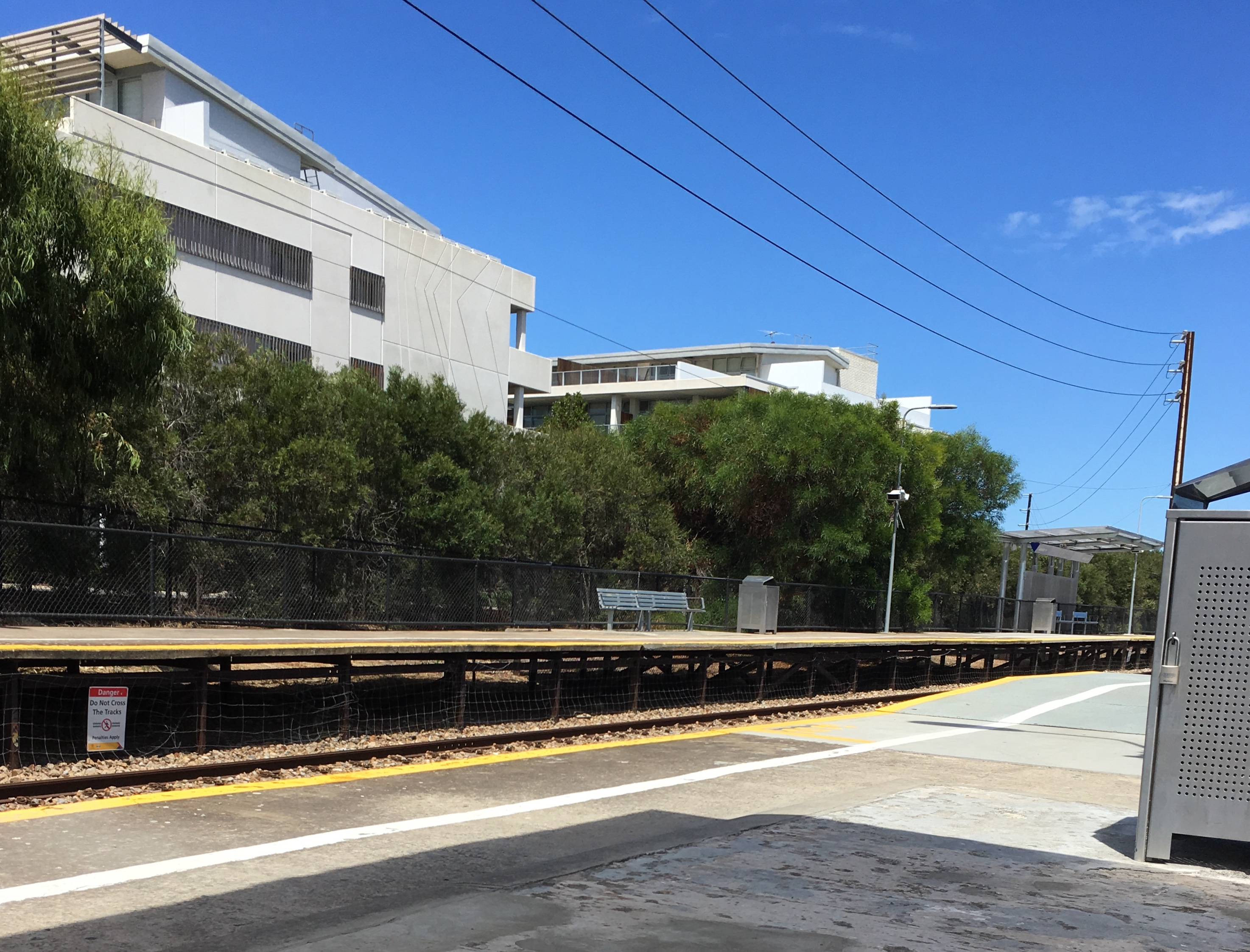
Eastbound view from Platform 2 in February 2018, prior to the station rebuild in June–November 2024

Ethelton station opened in 1916, following construction of the Commercial Road viaduct at Port Adelaide and a new bridge across the Port River. This new line diverted trains from Adelaide to Semaphore and Outer Harbor away from the congested rail yards at Port Dock station and to avoid heavy traffic along St Vincents Street in the centre of Port Adelaide. It has been unstaffed since the ticket office closed in 1980, and there is a small interchange for local buses adjacent to the station.

The railway tracks through Ethelton are dual gauge and capable of carrying both 1,600 mm (5 ft 3 in) broad gauge and 1,435 mm (4 ft 8 1/2 in) standard gauge trains. Until July 2008, the dual gauge tracks were used by freight trains from Dry Creek and the Rosewater loop which passed through Ethelton to access industrial facilities on the Lefevre Peninsula and the container terminal at Pelican Point. All freight services through the station ceased when the new Mary Mackillop Bridge opened. The disused standard gauge rails have been removed, however the dual gauge sleepers remain in place.

Sections of the platform were replaced in 2014, and the station's seating and shelters were replaced in 2017. The platforms were demolished and rebuilt in 2024.

== Services by platform ==
Platform	Lines	Destinations	Notes
1	Outer Harbor	all stops services to Outer Harbor	some peak hour services terminate at Osborne or Glanville
2	Outer Harbor	all stops services to Adelaide	some morning peak services run express from Port Adelaide
