= Taperoo railway station =

Railway station in Adelaide, South Australia

Taperoo
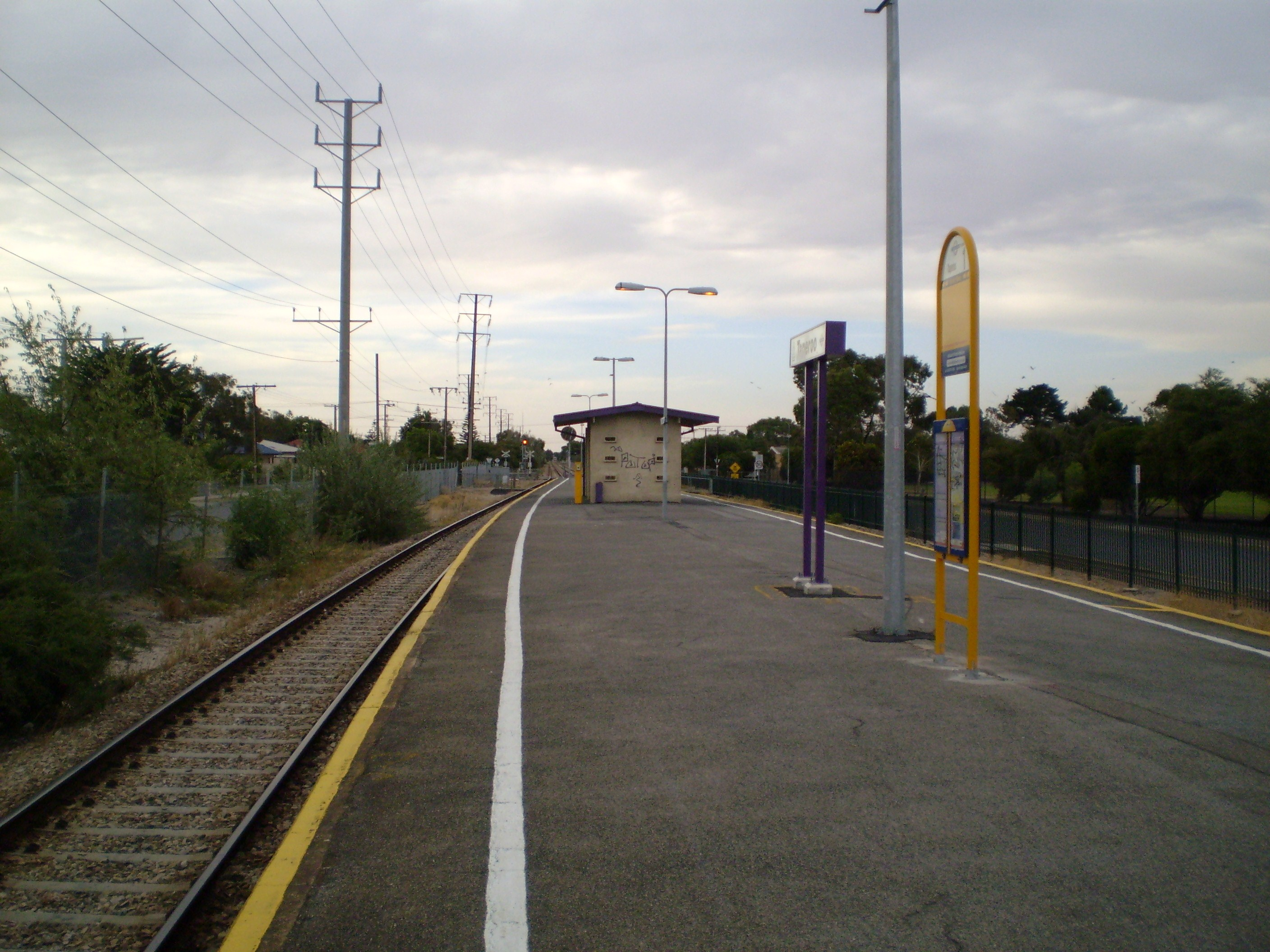
- Northbound view from Platform 2, April 2008

General information
- Location: Railway Terrace, Taperoo
- Coordinates: 34°48′20″S 138°29′57″E
- Owner: Department for Infrastructure & Transport
- Operator: Adelaide Metro
- Line: Outer Harbor
- Distance: 18.2 km from Adelaide
- Platforms: 2
- Tracks: 2
- Bus routes: None

Construction
- Structure type: Ground
- Parking: No
- Cycle facilities: No
- Accessible: Yes

History
- Opened: 1920
- Rebuilt: 1955

Services
Preceding station	Adelaide Metro	Following station
Draper towards Adelaide	Outer Harbor line	Midlunga towards Osborne or Outer Harbor
Location

Taperoo railway station is located on the Outer Harbor line. Situated in the north-western Adelaide suburb of Taperoo, it is 18.2 kilometres from Adelaide station.

== History ==
This station was built in 1920. It was originally named Silicate Siding, and was renamed Taperoo on 22 November 1920.

Originally a step down platform, it was replaced with the current island platform in 1955.

The station was upgraded in 2017 with a new shelter along with new signage and lighting.

== Services by platform ==
Platform	Lines	Destinations	Notes
1	Outer Harbor	all stops services to Outer Harbor	some peak hour services terminate at Osborne
2	Outer Harbor	all stops services to Adelaide	
