= Peterhead, South Australia =

Peterhead
- Suburb
- Country: Australia
- State: South Australia
- City: Adelaide
- LGA: City of Port Adelaide Enfield
- Established: 1875

Government
  - State electorate: Port Adelaide
  - Federal division: Hindmarsh

Area
  - Total: 0.4 km^{2} (0.15 sq mi)

Population
  - Total: 1,201 (SAL 2021)
- Postcode: 5016
Suburbs around Peterhead
Largs Bay	Largs North
Semaphore	Peterhead
Exeter	Birkenhead

Peterhead is a north-western suburb of Adelaide 15 km from the CBD, on the Lefevre Peninsula, in the state of South Australia, Australia and falls under the City of Port Adelaide Enfield. It is adjacent to Largs Bay and Birkenhead. The postcode for Peterhead is 5016. It is bounded to the north by Wills Street, to the south by Hargrave Street and in the west and east by the Outer Harbor railway line and the Port River respectively.

== History ==
Peterhead was laid out in August 1875 by William Diverall, the land broker of Port Adelaide on section 1099, Hundred of Port Adelaide. The name is from Scotland, Diverall's original homeland. Peterhead Post Office opened around 1886.

== Facilities ==
The suburb is not served by a primary school, the nearest is Le Fevre Primary School in Birkenhead, and the local high school is Le Fevre High School, in nearby Semaphore South. There is a small museum on Fletcher Road, and a scout hall on Wills Street. An On The Run service station and convenience store serves the suburb on Victoria Road, opposite Adelaide Brighton Cement.

The eastern side of the suburb, by the Port riverside is the location of the Adelaide Brighton Cement company, and a berth for the Shell oil company.

The Austbuilt Maritime Museum is located on Fletcher Road, Peterhead.

== Transport ==
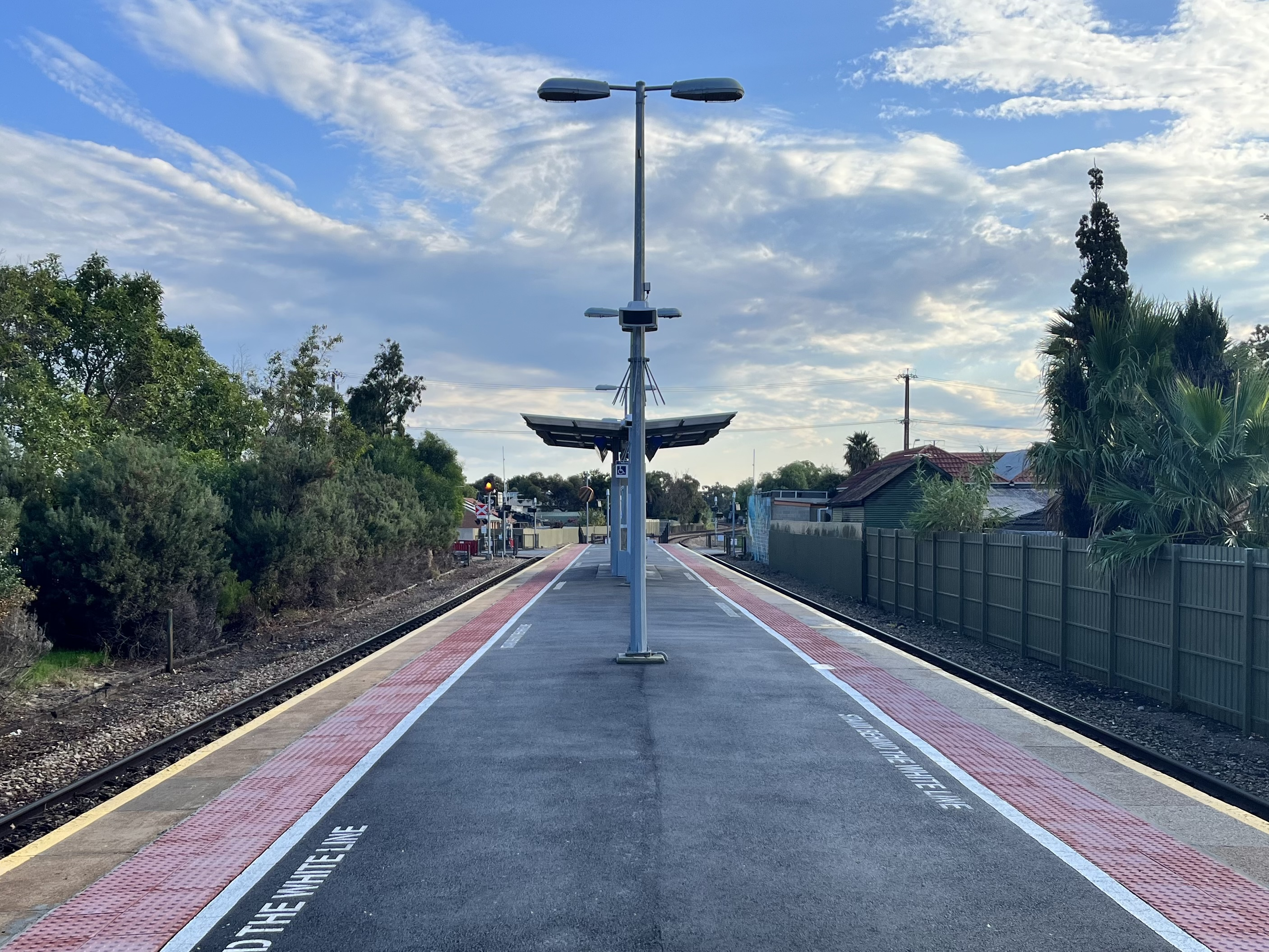
Peterhead railway station in 2023

Peterhead is serviced by Adelaide Metro train and bus services. The 150 bus to Adelaide (via Port Adelaide) and Osborne, services Fletcher Road. Peterhead railway station is located on the Outer Harbor railway line, which sits just south of the border on Hargrave street, Birkenhead.

== Governance ==
Peterhead is located in the federal division of Hindmarsh, the state electoral district of Port Adelaide and the local government area of the City of Port Adelaide Enfield.
