= Outer Harbour =

Outer Harbour or Harbor may refer to:

- Great Yarmouth Outer Harbour, England
- Outer Harbor, South Australia
  - Outer Harbor railway line
  - Outer Harbor railway station
- Outer Harbour Ferry Terminal, Macau, China
- Outer Harbour of Fremantle Harbour, Australia
- Outer Harbour of Toronto Harbour, Canada
