= Largs Bay, South Australia =

Largs Bay
- Suburb
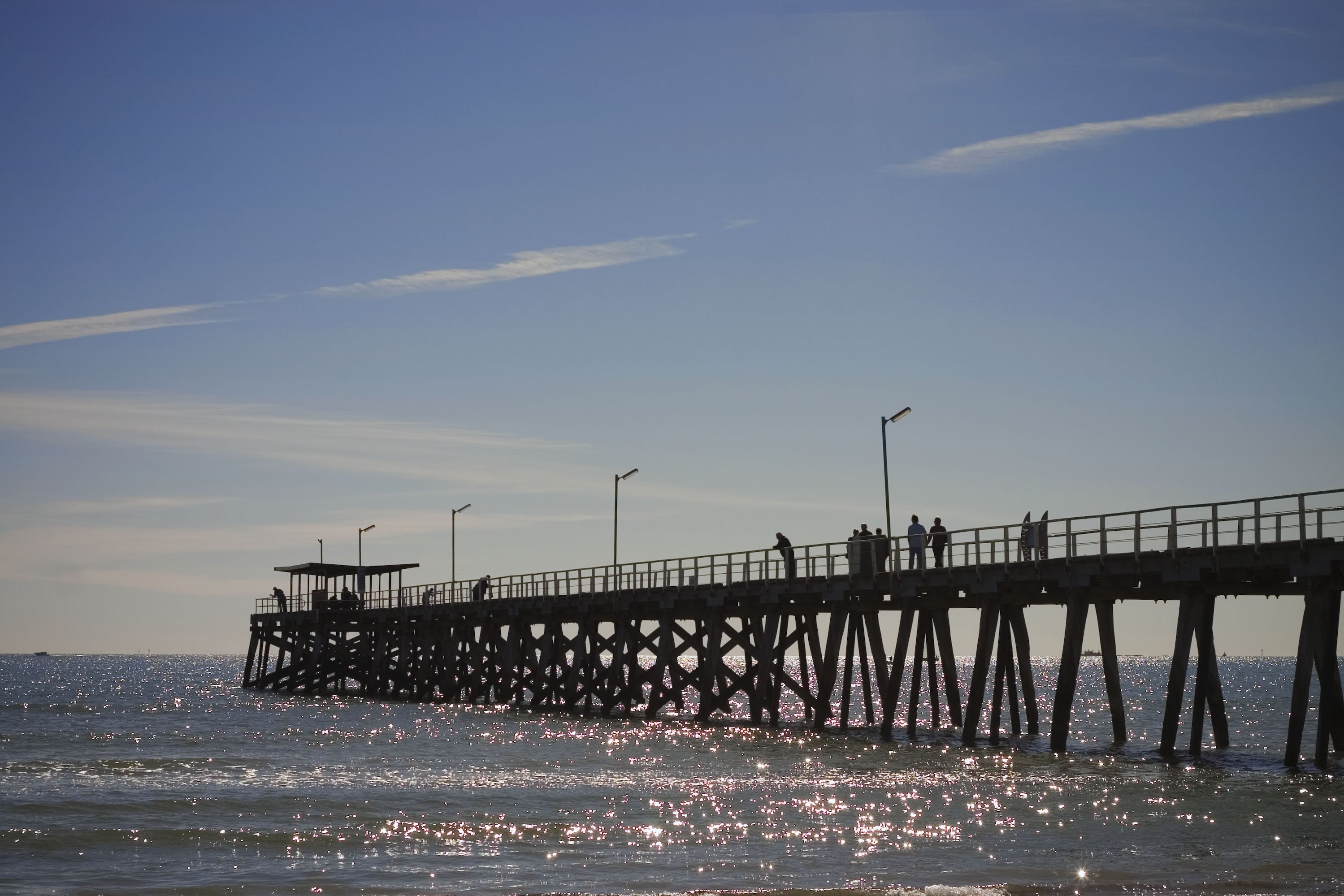
- The Largs Bay jetty
- Interactive map of Largs Bay
- Country: Australia
- State: South Australia
- City: Adelaide
- LGA: City of Port Adelaide Enfield
- Location: 15 km (9.3 mi) from CBD

Government
  - State electorate: Port Adelaide
  - Federal division: Hindmarsh

Population
  - Total: 4,104 (SAL 2021)
- Postcode: 5016
Suburbs around Largs Bay
Gulf St Vincent	Largs North	Port Adelaide
Gulf St Vincent	Largs Bay	Port Adelaide
Gulf St Vincent	Semaphore; Peterhead	Port Adelaide

Largs Bay is a suburb in the Australian state of South Australia located on the Lefevre Peninsula in the west of Adelaide about 16 kilometres (9.9 mi) northwest of the Adelaide city centre.

== Description ==
Largs Bay is bounded to the north by Walcot and Warwick Street, to the south by Wills, Hargrave and Union Streets and in the west and east by Gulf St Vincent and the centre of the Port River respectively. It is adjacent to the suburbs of Largs North, Peterhead, Port Adelaide and Semaphore. It is essentially a residential suburb, with a minor harbourside presence on the eastern side of the suburb. It is located within the local government area of the City of Port Adelaide Enfield.

== History ==
Largs Bay originally started as a private sub-division in Section 1069 in the cadastral unit of the Hundred of Port Adelaide. The name was "formally submitted by the City of Port Adelaide at a council meeting held on 10 May 1945" and was formally adopted in 1951 by the Nomenclature Committee. In August 2009, its eastern boundary was extended to the centre of the Port River.

== Facilities ==
The suburb is served by a primary school, Largs Bay Primary School, and the local high school is Ocean View College Gedville Campus, in nearby Taperoo. There is a hospice on Everard Street and a museum on Fletcher Road. Largs Reserve overlooking Woolnough Road is the main outdoor recreational reserve in the suburb, being the site of a lawn bowling club. The Largs Pier Hotel on the Esplanade was used as a historical landmark in earlier times by sailors. A sailing club and a jetty are present on Largs Bay Beach.

The eastern side of the suburb, by the Port riverside is the location of three shipping berths, which are used by Caltex, BP and Mobil vessels.

== Heritage listings ==
Largs Bay has a number of heritage-listed sites, including:

- Esplanade: Largs Bay Jetty
- 138-139 Esplanade: Largs Bay College
- 198 Esplanade: Largs Pier Hotel
- 11-15 Jetty Road: Largs Bay Land and Investment Company's Shops
- 212 Lady Gowrie Drive: Montrose

== Transport ==
The 157 and 333 buses service Military Road, while the 150 services Fletcher Road. The suburb is also serviced by Largs and Largs North railway stations on the Outer Harbor railway line.

== Governance ==
Largs Bay is located in the federal division of Hindmarsh, the state electoral district of Port Adelaide and the local government area of the City of Port Adelaide Enfield.
