= North Haven railway station =

Railway station in Adelaide, South Australia

North Haven
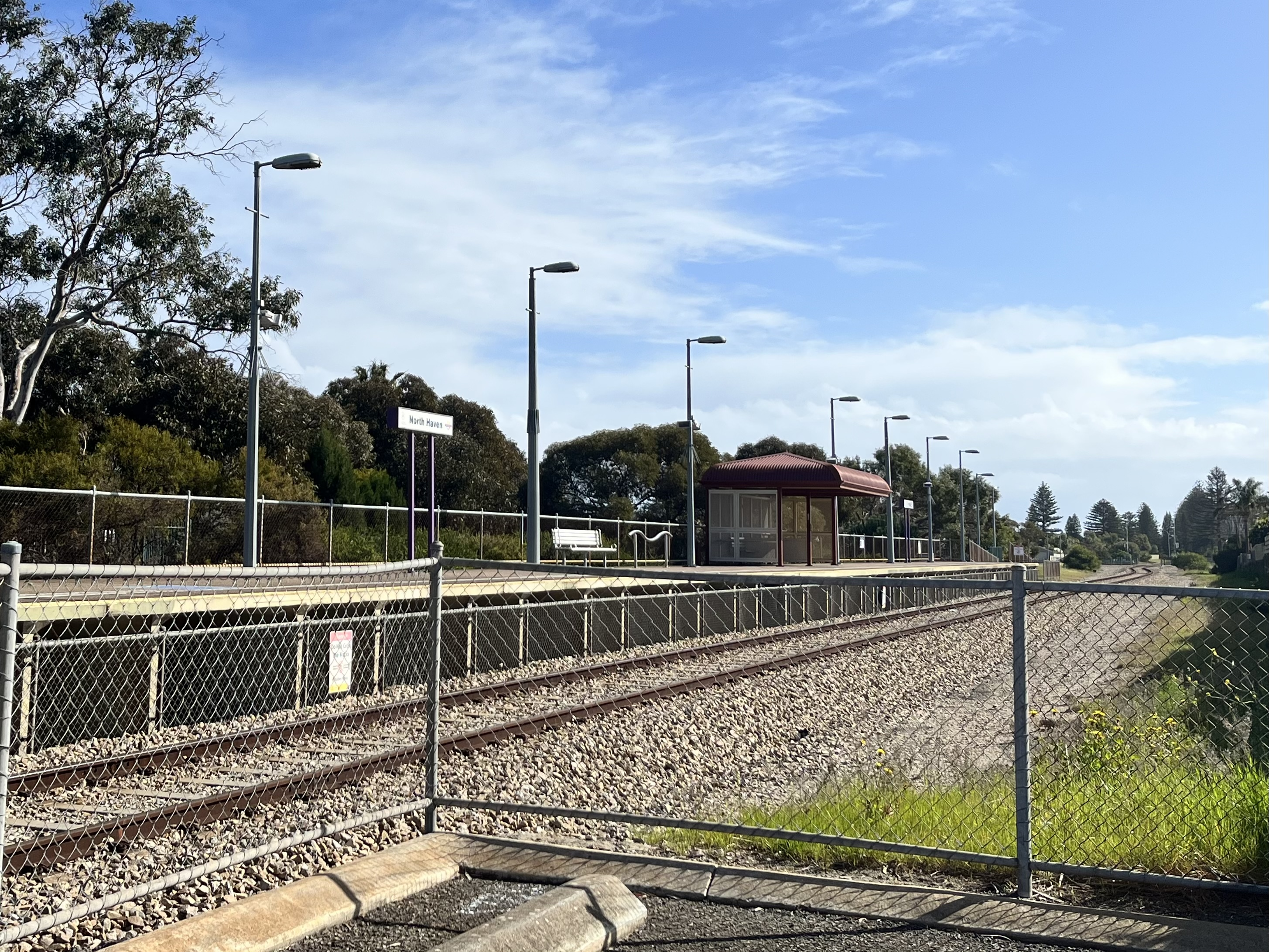
- Westbound view of the station platforms, July 2023

General information
- Location: Merle Marin Drive, North Haven
- Owner: Department for Infrastructure & Transport
- Operator: Adelaide Metro
- Line: Outer Harbor
- Distance: 20.5 km from Adelaide
- Platforms: 1
- Tracks: 1
- Bus routes: None

Construction
- Structure type: Ground
- Parking: Yes
- Cycle facilities: No
- Accessible: Yes

History
- Opened: 1981

Services
Preceding station	Adelaide Metro	Following station
Osborne towards Adelaide	Outer Harbor line	Outer Harbor Terminus
Location

North Haven railway station is located on the Outer Harbor line. Situated in the north-western Adelaide suburb of North Haven, it is 20.5 kilometres from Adelaide station.

== History ==
North Haven opened on 13 September 1981 replacing Yerlo railway station.

Until just after Midlunga, the train line is double tracked. Osborne, North Haven and Outer Harbour are all serviced by a single track which means only one train is permitted in this section at any one time.

== Services by platform ==
Platform	Lines	Destinations	Notes
1	Outer Harbor	all stops services to Outer Harbor/Adelaide	Some services in the morning peak go express between Port Adelaide and Adelaide.
2	—N/a		not in use
