= Largs railway station, Adelaide =

Railway station in Adelaide, South Australia

Largs
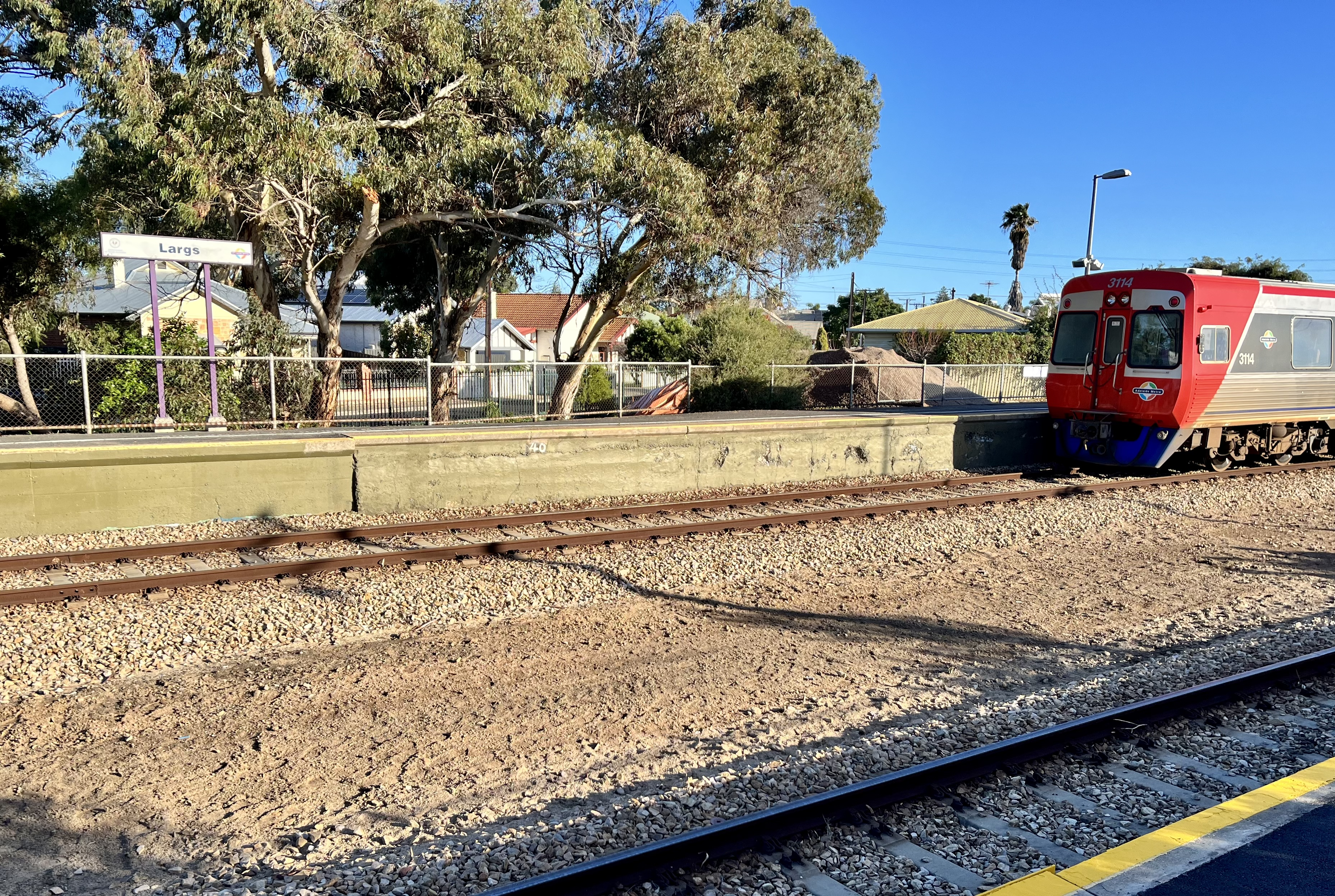
- Westbound view of Platform 2 with a 3000 class railcar departing at that platform, June 2023

General information
- Location: Mead Street, Largs Bay
- Coordinates: 34°49′38″S 138°29′28″E
- Owner: Department for Infrastructure & Transport
- Operator: Adelaide Metro
- Line: Outer Harbor
- Distance: 15.5 km from Adelaide
- Platforms: 2
- Tracks: 2
- Bus routes: 157, 333
- Connections: Bus

Construction
- Structure type: Side platform
- Parking: Yes
- Cycle facilities: No
- Accessible: Yes

History
- Opened: 1907

Services
Preceding station	Adelaide Metro	Following station
Peterhead towards Adelaide	Outer Harbor line	Largs North towards Osborne or Outer Harbor
Location

Largs railway station is located on the Outer Harbor line. Situated in the north-western Adelaide suburb of Largs Bay, it is 15.5 kilometres from Adelaide station.

== History ==
Largs station was opened in 1907. A short line to Largs Jetty branched off just south of the station, but this closed in 1908. Originally, Largs station had a centre track in that space that was connected between both tracks and used as holding siding for trains, hence why the gap between the platforms is unusually wider than most stations.

In 2014, some minor works were undertaken on the station to provide help with patrons from a nearby retirement village on Jetty Road. This included two new ramps on the Jetty Road side of the station, and parts of the platform was raised for wheelchairs.

== Services by platform ==
Platform	Lines	Destinations	Notes
1	Outer Harbor	all stops services to Outer Harbor	some peak hour services terminate at Osborne
2	Outer Harbor	all stops services to Adelaide	
