= Largs North railway station =

Railway station in Adelaide, South Australia

Largs North
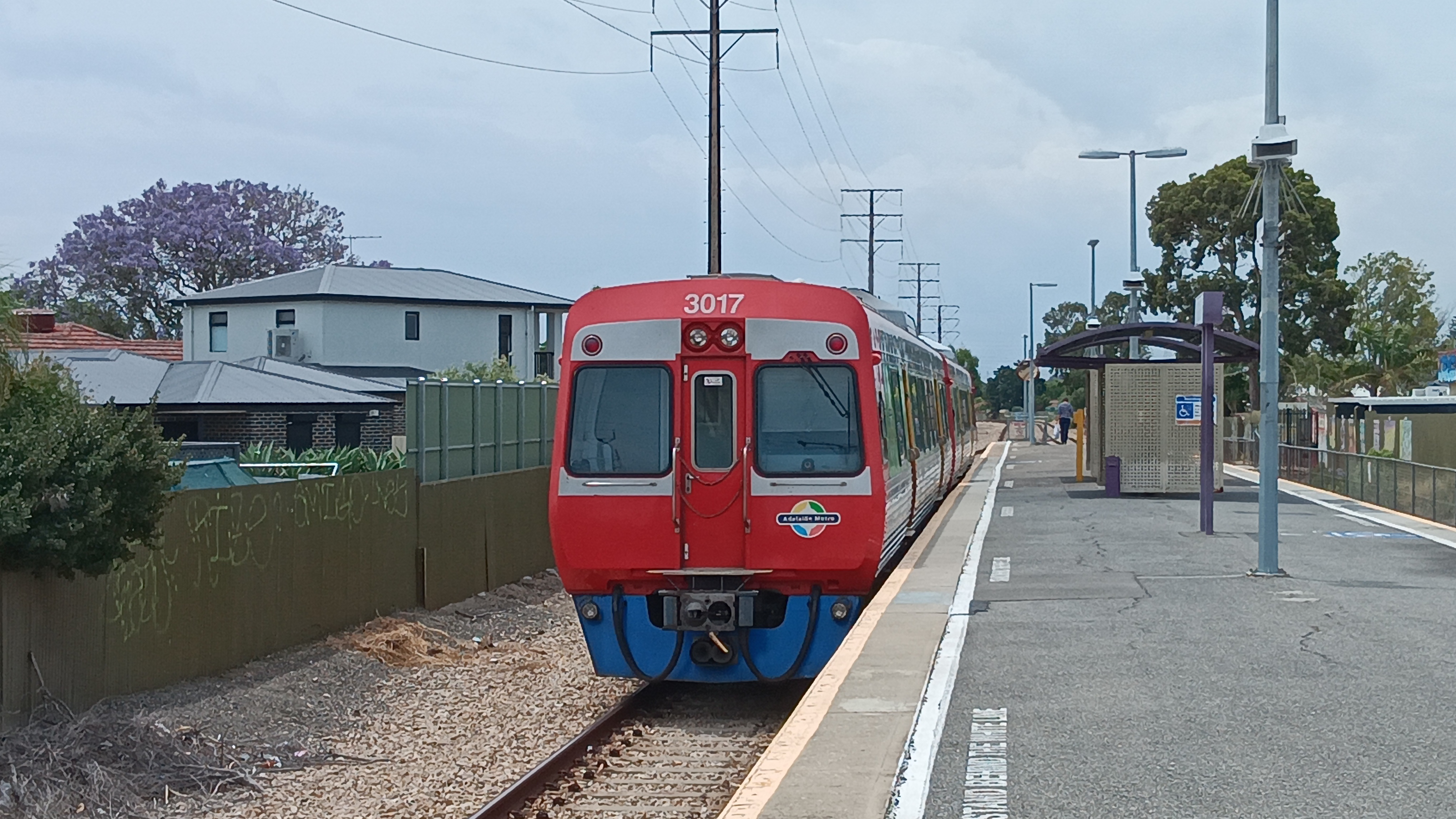
- Two railcars at the station in November 2024

General information
- Location: Fletcher Road, Largs North
- Coordinates: 34°49′12″S 138°29′41″E
- Owner: Department for Infrastructure & Transport
- Operator: Adelaide Metro
- Line: Outer Harbor
- Distance: 16.4 km from Adelaide
- Platforms: 2
- Tracks: 2
- Bus routes: 150, 333
- Connections: Bus

Construction
- Structure type: Ground
- Parking: No
- Cycle facilities: No
- Accessible: Yes

History
- Opened: 21 August 1916
- Rebuilt: 1943, 2002

Services
| Preceding station | Adelaide Metro | Following station |
|---|---|---|
| Largs towards Adelaide | Outer Harbor line | Draper towards Osborne or Outer Harbor |
Location

Largs North railway station is located on the Outer Harbor line. Situated in the north-western Adelaide suburb of Largs North, it is 16.4 kilometres (10¼ miles) from Adelaide station. Journeys to and from the Adelaide station usually take 30 minutes.

== History ==
The station opened on 21 August 1916 as 'Swansea' after H. C. Swan. The station was renamed Largs North on 1 November 1945.

== Services by platform ==
| Platform | Lines | Destinations | Notes |
|---|---|---|---|
| 1 | Outer Harbor | all stops services to Outer Harbor | some peak hour services terminate at Osborne |
| 2 | Outer Harbor | all stops services to Adelaide | |
