= Midlunga railway station =

Railway station in Adelaide, South Australia

Midlunga
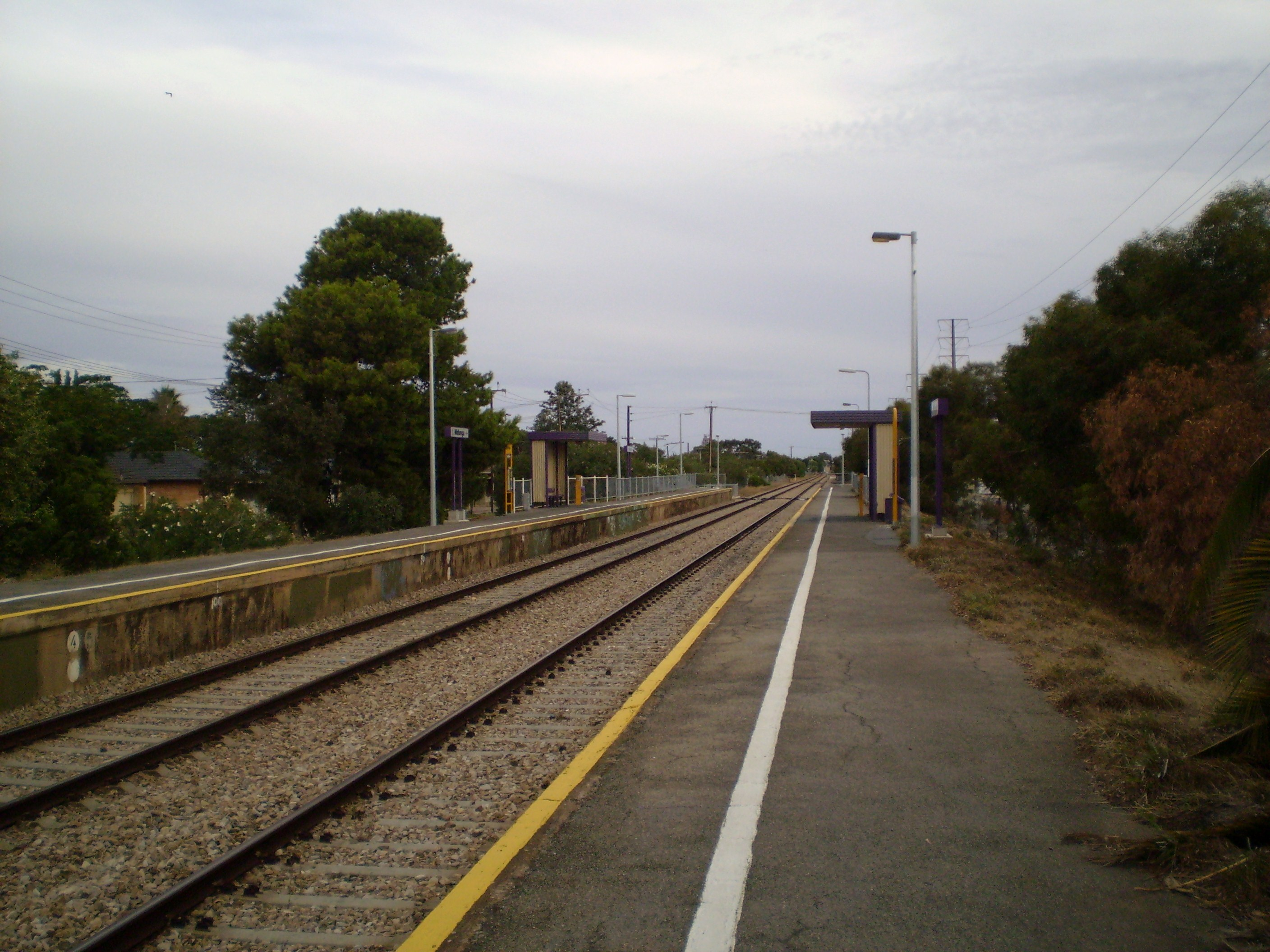
- Southbound view from Platform 2, April 2008

General information
- Location: Railway Terrace, Osborne
- Coordinates: 34°47′58″S 138°29′57″E
- Owner: Department for Infrastructure & Transport
- Operator: Adelaide Metro
- Line: Outer Harbor
- Distance: 18.8 kilometres from Adelaide
- Platforms: 2 side
- Tracks: 2
- Connections: Bus

Construction
- Structure type: Ground

Other information
- Website: Adelaide Metro

History
- Opened: 1921
- Rebuilt: 17 July 1961

Services
Preceding station	Adelaide Metro	Following station
Taperoo towards Adelaide	Outer Harbor line	Osborne towards Osborne or Outer Harbor
Location

Midlunga railway station is a railway station located on the Outer Harbor line, in Adelaide, Australia. Situated in the north-western Adelaide suburb of Osborne, South Australia, it is 18.8 kilometres (11.7 mi) from Adelaide station.

== History ==
Midlunga railway station was opened in 1921. It was named after a nearby land divide. The name is a portmanteau of midla and nga, two Kaurna words that mean spear thrower and the place of respectively.

The station originally had lower step-down platforms. In 1950 Port Adelaide Council petitioned the Railway Commissioner to build high level earth-filled platforms, but this request was refused. The station appeared in the "Chief Engineer For Railways Map Showing Lines of Railways in South Australia" published in June 1950, and the June 1966 Metropolitan and Country Time and Fare Tables.

Just north of Midlunga station, the line merges into a single track for the final three kilometres to Outer Harbor. The line was reduced to a single track in October 1988.

In 2016, the station was included on a list of worst stations in Adelaide's west, based on 5 criteria.

== Services by platform ==
Platform	Lines	Destinations	Notes
1	Outer Harbor	all stops services to Outer Harbor	some peak hour services terminate at Osborne
2	Outer Harbor	all stops services to Adelaide	

== Transport links ==
Bus transfers: Stop 60 (Victoria Road)
Route no.	Destination & route details
150	City via Victoria Road, Carnarvon Terrace, Fletcher Road & Port Road

Bus transfers: Stop 58 (Military Road)
Route no.	Destination & route details
333	Port Adelaide via Military Road, Hart Street, Glanville station & Semaphore Road
