= Ethelton (disambiguation) =

Ethelton may refer to:

- Ethelton, South Australia, a suburb of Adelaide, South Australia
- Ethelton railway station, which services Ethelton, South Australia
- Ethelton Football Club, one of three Australian rules football clubs that merged to form Portland Football Club (South Australia)
