= North Haven, South Australia =

North Haven
- Suburb
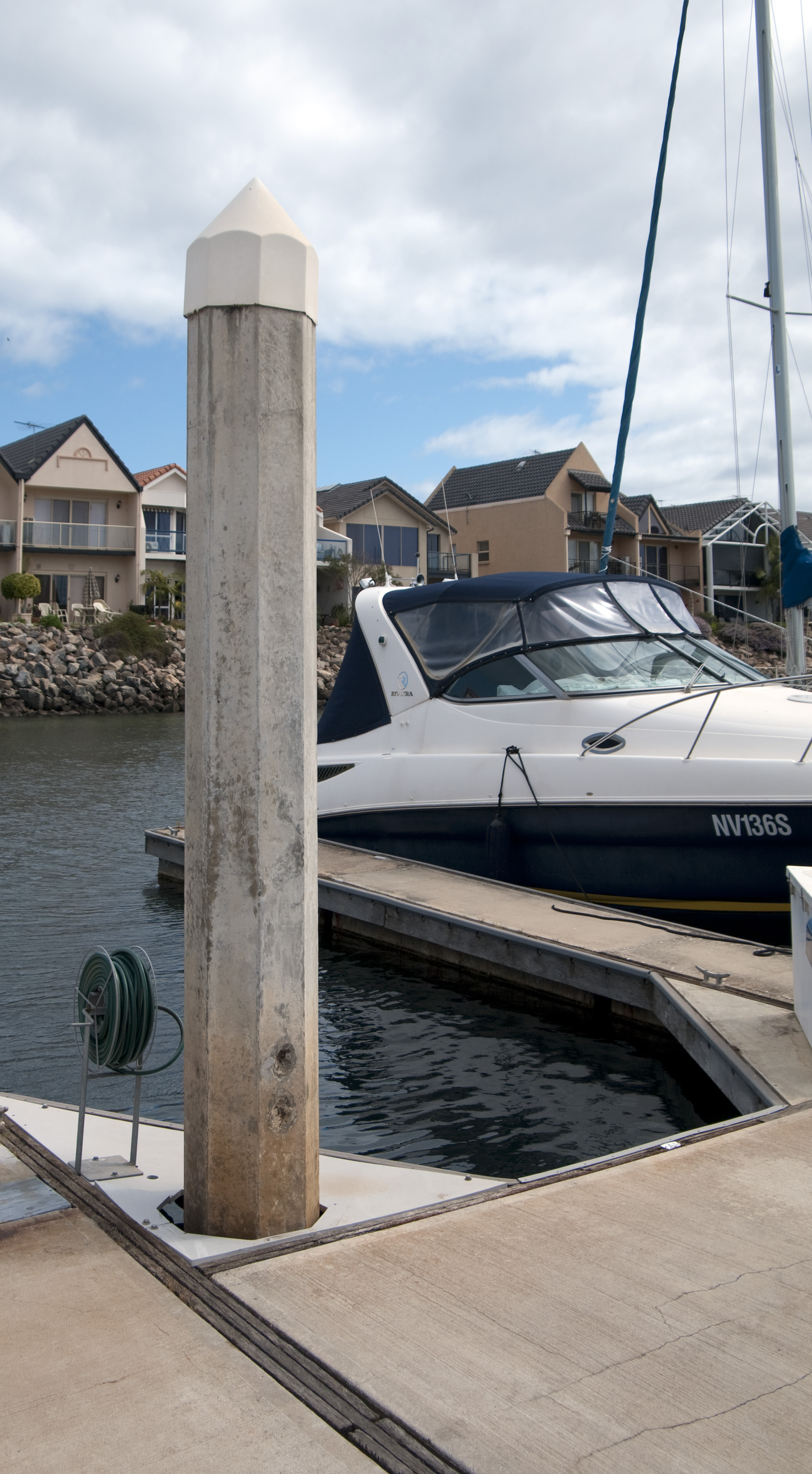
- Floating dock at North Haven

- Coordinates: 34.787510°S 138.492160°E
- Country: Australia
- State: South Australia
- LGA: City of Port Adelaide Enfield
- Location: 18 km (11 mi) northwest of Adelaide city centre
- Established: 1975

Government
  - State electorate: Port Adelaide
  - Federal division: Hindmarsh

Population
  - Total: 5,585 (SAL 2021)
- Time zone: UTC+9:30 (ACST)
  - Summer (DST): UTC+10:30 (ACST)
- Postcode: 5018
- Mean max temp: 22.4 °C (72.3 °F)
- Mean min temp: 11.2 °C (52.2 °F)
- Annual rainfall: 451.1 mm (17.76 in)
Suburbs around North Haven
Gulf St Vincent	Outer Harbor	Outer Harbor
Gulf St Vincent	North Haven	Outer Harbor; Osborne
Gulf St Vincent	Osborne	Osborne
- Location; Coordinates; Climate; Adjoining suburbs

North Haven is a north-western suburb of Adelaide, in the state of South Australia, Australia. It is located 20 km from the Central Business District (CBD), and falls under the City of Port Adelaide Enfield. It is adjacent to Osborne and Outer Harbour. It is bounded to the north and east by Oliver Rogers and Victoria Road, to the south by Marmora Terrace and to the west by Gulf St Vincent. The postal code for North Haven is 5018.

The small residential area north of the Gulf Point Marina is a part of Outer Harbour, although it lies within the boundaries of North Haven.

== History ==
North Haven originally started as a private sub-division in Section 769 in the cadastral unit of Hundred of Port Adelaide. Its creation in 1976 was originally opposed by the Postmaster General of Australia due to "size & duplication of name else in Australia". Its boundaries have been altered as follows: Since 1976 – the boundary with the suburb of Outer Harbour, addition of land from the suburb of Osborne and other 'unnamed land', and the addition of a 'portion of the Harbour' in February 2007.

== Facilities ==
The suburb is served by a retirement village on Military Road, a small shopping centre on Osborne Road. That has some retail stores and is home to a supermarket, a chemist and a bakery as well as other restaurants and businesses. The western coastal side of the suburb contains Surf Lifesaving Club and the Gulf Point Marina, which is home to a sailing community. The marina, lined with houses, is protected by two artificial breakwaters. Attached to the marina is the Cruising Yacht Club of South Australia.

The local cricket club is the North Haven Cricket Club which fields several teams in Adelaide and Suburban Cricket Association.

== Education ==
North Haven is also home to a local Primary School (North Haven School R-7) and a Kindergarten (North Haven Kindergarten). North Haven does not have a high school, with the closest, Ocean View College B-12, being in the nearby suburb of Taperoo.

== Transport ==
The 330 bus services both Lady Gowrie and Osborne Roads, and Osborne and Victoria Roads. The Outer Harbor railway line terminates at Outer Harbor railway station. The suburb is serviced by two more train stations: North Haven railway station and Osborne railway station.

== Governance ==
North Haven is located within the federal division of Hindmarsh, the state electoral district of Port Adelaide and the local government area of the City of Port Adelaide Enfield.

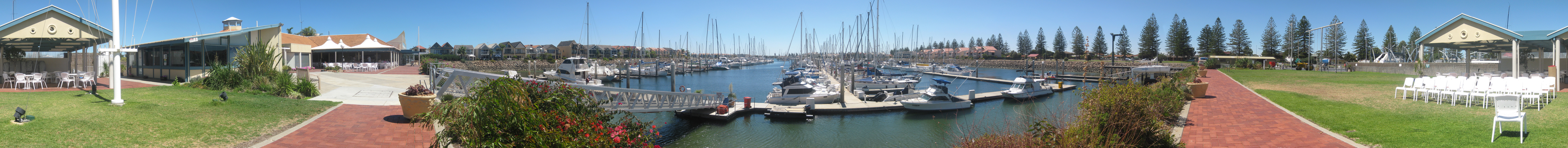
360° panorama of the Cruising Yacht Club of South Australia, located at North Haven
