= Largs Pier Hotel =

Hotel and hospitality venue in South Australia

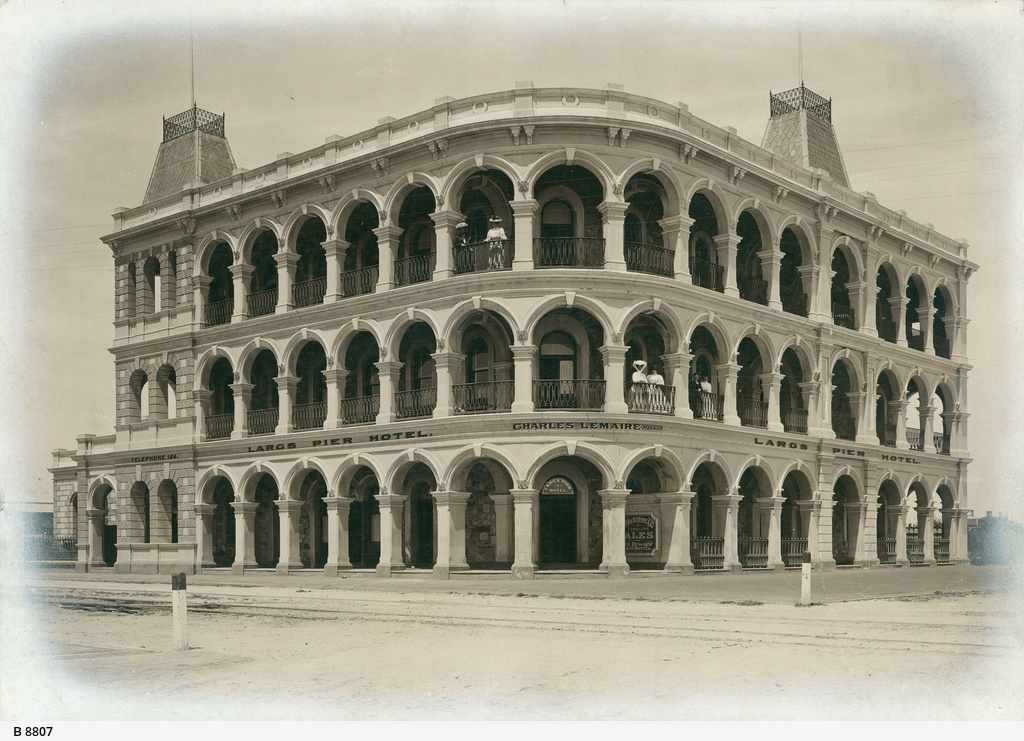

- Location in South Australia

General information
- Location: Largs Bay, South Australia, Australia, 198 Esplanade Largs Bay SA 5016
- Coordinates: 34.8256°S 138.4865°E
- Opening: 1882

Website
- www.largspierhotel.com.au

Largs Pier Hotel is located on the corner of The Esplanade and Jetty Road in Largs Bay, South Australia.

== History ==
The Largs Pier Hotel opened in 1882 on the same day as the Largs Bay Railway and Pier. Believed to be 23 December according to The Port Adelaide Historical Society.

From 1882 till around 1892 the Largs Pier was the primary port of call for new Australians travelling from Europe. Many of these immigrants spent their first nights in Australia at the hotel.

The drive-through bottle shop at the Largs Pier Hotel was the first of its kind in Australia, opening in 1953.

== Music ==
The Largs Pier Hotel has a rich history of live performances. Jimmy Barnes has such fond memories of playing at the venue that he wrote a song in 2010 honouring the Hotel, "Largs Pier Hotel", which appears on his 30:30 Hindsight Album. AC/DC frontman Bon Scott met his wife, Irene Thornton at the Hotel after a performance in 1974.

Other acts to play at the venue include Lobby Loyde, Split Enz, The Angels, Cold Chisel and Billy Thorpe, in addition to Mississippi, Skyhooks, Little River Band and Rose Tattoo. Don Walker of Cold Chisel mentions the hotel in his song "Port Adelaide", from the soundtrack of the film Freedom.
