= Outer Harbor, South Australia =

Outer Harbor
- Suburb
- Coordinates: 34.781°S 138.501°E
- Country: Australia
- State: South Australia
- City: Adelaide
- LGA: City of Port Adelaide Enfield
- Location: 22 km (14 mi) NW of Adelaide city centre
- Established: 1908

Government
  - State electorate: Port Adelaide
  - Federal division: Hindmarsh

Population
  - Total: 13 (SAL 2021)
- Postcode: 5018
Suburbs around Outer Harbor
Port River	Port River	Port River
Port River	Outer Harbor	Osborne
North Haven	North Haven; Osborne	Osborne

Outer Harbor is a suburb in the Australian state of South Australia located at the northern tip of the Lefevre Peninsula about 22 kilometres (14 mi) north-west of the Adelaide city centre.

== Description ==
Outer Harbor is essentially an industrial suburb, consisting mainly of shipping and transport related infrastructure. Administratively, it lies in the City of Port Adelaide Enfield. It includes the headland of Pelican Point. It is bounded to the east by Osborne, the southwest by North Haven and in every other direction by the Port River.

Light Passage, named after founder of Adelaide Colonel William Light, lies in the Port River between Pelican Point and Torrens Island.

== Population ==
In the 2016 census 12 people were recorded as residing in Outer Harbor and the adjoining part of the suburb of Osborne.

== Transport ==
The primary form of public transport in Outer Harbor is the Outer Harbor railway line which connects the area to the centre of the City of Adelaide. The terminus of this line is the Outer Harbor station, situated next to the North Haven Golf Course and Overseas Passenger Terminal.

Until the 1970s Outer Harbor was a relatively isolated locality, separated from Largs Bay and Taperoo by several kilometres of sparsely occupied sand dunes and scrub. Apart from the railway, only a single loop road gave access to the port. Sections of that road presently bear four different names: Lady Gowrie Drive, Lady Ruthven Drive, Oliver Rodgers Road, and Victoria Road. Since the 1930s a singular feature of this road has been that it is bordered by an impressive avenue of Norfolk Pines.

One bus route services the area, the 330, a loop service connecting with other bus services in neighbouring North Haven. Services are provided by Adelaide Metro.

== History ==
Outer Harbor was established at the beginning of the 20th century, due to the increasing size of ships and the length of time it took to sail up the Port River to the inner harbour of Port Adelaide. The first ship to dock there was the RMS Oruba. on 16 January 1908. The shipping channel leading to the Outer Harbor was dredged to a depth of 14.2m to accommodate Panamax-sized ships with the work being completed in February 2006.

The Outer Harbor passenger terminal services an increasing number of cruise liners visiting Adelaide, with 27 arrivals in the 2012 cruise season.

The Outer Harbor Post Office opened on 9 May 1910 and closed in 1973.

Much of the extreme northern end of Lefevre Peninsula leading to Outer Harbor remained sand dunes until a housing and marina development named North Haven commenced in the 1970s. As a result, the entire peninsula is now merged into a single conurbation.

The historic former Outer Harbor Pilot Station is listed on the South Australian Heritage Register.

== Governance ==
Outer Harbor is located in the federal division of Hindmarsh, the state electoral district of Port Adelaide and the local government area of the City of Port Adelaide Enfield.

== Infrastructure and facilities ==
Outer Harbor contains the #6 container berth, the Overseas Passenger Terminal and the headquarters of the Royal South Australian Yacht Squadron. It is serviced by the Dry Creek-Port Adelaide railway line, a freight railway line which delivering goods to and from the shipping terminals.

== Other ==
Some light general aviation aircraft preparing to land at Parafield Airport pass over or near Outer Harbor.
