= Electoral district of Port Adelaide =

South Australian state electoral district

Port Adelaide South Australia—House of Assembly
- Interactive map of electoral district boundaries
- State: South Australia
- Dates current: 1857–1970, 2002–present
- MP: Cheyne Rich
- Party: Labor
- Namesake: Port Adelaide
- Electors: 28,778 (2026)
- Area: 84.3 km^{2} (32.5 sq mi)
- Demographic: Metropolitan
- Coordinates: 34°48′13″S 138°33′15″E
- Electorates around Port Adelaide
Gulf St Vincent	Taylor	Taylor
Gulf St Vincent	Port Adelaide	Ramsay; Playford; Florey
Gulf St Vincent	Several	Torrens

Footnotes
- Electoral District Profile and map

Port Adelaide is a single-member electoral district for the South Australian House of Assembly. Named after Port Adelaide, which it surrounds, it is a suburban and industrial electorate on Adelaide's Lefevre Peninsula, and stretches east toward Adelaide's northern suburbs. It contains a mix of seaside residential areas, wasteland and industrial regions. In addition to its namesake suburb of Port Adelaide, the district includes the suburbs of Birkenhead, Cavan, Dry Creek, Ethelton, Exeter, Garden Island, Gillman, Glanville, Largs Bay, Largs North, New Port, North Haven, Osborne, Ottoway, Outer Harbor, Peterhead, Semaphore, Taperoo, Torrens Island, Wingfield, as well as part of Rosewater.

== History ==
Port Adelaide has had three incarnations as a South Australian electoral district.

Port Adelaide was the name of an electoral district of the unicameral South Australian Legislative Council from 1851 until its abolition in 1857.

From 1857 until 1902 it was a two-seat multi-member district. From 1902 until 1915 it was a large three-seat multi-member district covering Adelaide's north-west and western suburbs; together with the four-member Adelaide and five-member Torrens, the three districts with a total of 12-members covered the whole of the metropolitan area in the 42 member house. The district returned to two members in 1915, and became a single member district from the 1938 election onward. It was held without interruption by Labor until the district's abolition prior to the 1970 election, and for most of that time was one of Labor's safest seats. The bulk of its territory was split between the neighbouring seats of Semaphore and Price. The last member for this seat's original incarnation, John Ryan, transferred to Price.

The seat was recreated in 2002, essentially as a reconfigured version of Hart (which was itself created in 1993 as a replacement for Semaphore). Like its previous incarnation, it is a comfortably safe Labor seat. The member for Hart, deputy premier and state treasurer Kevin Foley, followed most of his constituents into the recreated seat and won it easily. At the 2006 election, Foley increased his margin from 21.7 percent to 25.7 percent, and gained a majority in all booths. Foley resigned in December 2011 after serving a total of 18 years in the lower house, triggering a by-election held in February 2012. Susan Close retained the seat for Labor, and held it for 14 years, until her retirement at the end of her term in March 2026.

== 2020 redistribution ==
The following boundary changes occurred in the 2020 redistribution, due to increasing voter enrollments since 2012, putting the electorate 9.1% over the Quota Variance - Bolivar, Globe Derby Park and St Kilda were transferred to the Electoral district of Taylor and Gepps Cross to Electoral district of Enfield.

== 2024 redistribution ==
The only boundary change following the 2024 redistribution, for the 2026 Election, was the loss of Semaphore South to the Electoral district of Lee.

== Members ==
Two members (1857–1902)
Member	Party	Term	Member	Party	Term
John Hart Sr.		1857–1859	John Hughes		1857–1858
John Hart Sr.		1857–1859	Edward Collinson		1858–1860
William Owen		1860–1862	Patrick Coglin		1860–1865
John Hart Sr.		1862–1866	Patrick Coglin		1860–1865
John Hart Sr.		1862–1866	David Bower		1865–1870
Jacob Smith		1866–1868	David Bower		1865–1870
Henry Hill		1868–1870	David Bower		1865–1870
William Quin		1870–1871	Henry Kent Hughes		1870–1875
John Duncan		1871–1875	Henry Kent Hughes		1870–1875
William Quin		1875–1880			
William Quin		1875–1880	David Bower		1875–1887
John Hart Jr.		1880–1881	David Bower		1875–1887
William Mattinson		1881–1890	David Bower		1875–1887
William Mattinson		1881–1890	George Hopkins		1887–1893
Ben Rounsevell		1890–1893	George Hopkins		1887–1893
William Archibald	Labor	1893–1902	Ivor MacGillivray	Labor	1893–1902

Three members (1902–1915)
Member	Party	Term	Member	Party	Term	Member	Party	Term
William Archibald	Labor	1902–1910	Ivor MacGillivray	Labor	1902–1915	Thomas Brooker		1902–1905
William Archibald	Labor	1902–1910	Ivor MacGillivray	Labor	1902–1915	Henry Chesson	Labor	1905–1915
Thompson Green	Labor	1910–1915	Ivor MacGillivray	Labor	1902–1915	Henry Chesson	Labor	1905–1915

Two members (1915–1938)
Member	Party	Term	Member	Party	Term
John Price	Labor	1915–1925	Ivor MacGillivray	Labor	1915–1917
John Price	Labor	1915–1925	Ivor MacGillivray	National	1917–1918
John Price	Labor	1915–1925	John Stanley Verran	Labor	1918–1924
John Price	Labor	1915–1925	Frank Condon	Labor	1924–1927
John Stanley Verran	Labor	1925–1927	Frank Condon	Labor	1924–1927
John Jonas	Labor	1927–1933	Thomas Thompson	Protestant Labor	1927–1930
John Jonas	Labor	1927–1933	Albert Thompson	Labor	1930–1938
James Stephens	Labor	1933–1938	Albert Thompson	Labor	1930–1938

Single-member (1938–1970)
Member	Party	Term
James Stephens	Labor	1938–1959
John Ryan	Labor	1959–1970
Single-member (2002–present)
Member	Party	Term
Kevin Foley	Labor	2002–2011
Susan Close	Labor	2012–2026
Cheyne Rich	Labor	2026–present

== Election results ==
2026 South Australian state election: Port Adelaide
Party	Candidate	Votes	%	±%
Labor	Cheyne Rich	9,312	39.3	−19.1
One Nation	Joel Hendrie	5,080	21.4	+21.4
Independent	Claire Boan	3,097	13.1	+13.1
Greens	Hayden Shaw	2,425	10.2	+0.0
Liberal	Scott Anderson	1,724	7.3	−15.3
Legalise Cannabis	Sallyann Keen	511	2.1	+2.1
Independent	Gary Johanson	446	1.9	+1.9
Independent	Anne McMenamin	341	1.4	+1.4
Family First	Lucia Snelling	332	1.4	−3.6
Fair Go	Galina Brunoli	253	1.1	+1.1
Australian Family	Tom Day	135	0.6	+0.6
United Voice	Aaron Machado	44	0.2	+0.2
Total formal votes		23,700	92.8	−3.8
Informal votes		1,848	7.2	+3.8
Turnout		25,548	88.8	+0.7
Two-party-preferred result
Labor	Cheyne Rich	15,272	64.4	−7.4
One Nation	Joel Hendrie	8,428	35.6	+35.6
Labor hold		Swing	−7.4	
