= Hundred of Port Adelaide =

Port Adelaide
- Cadastral division
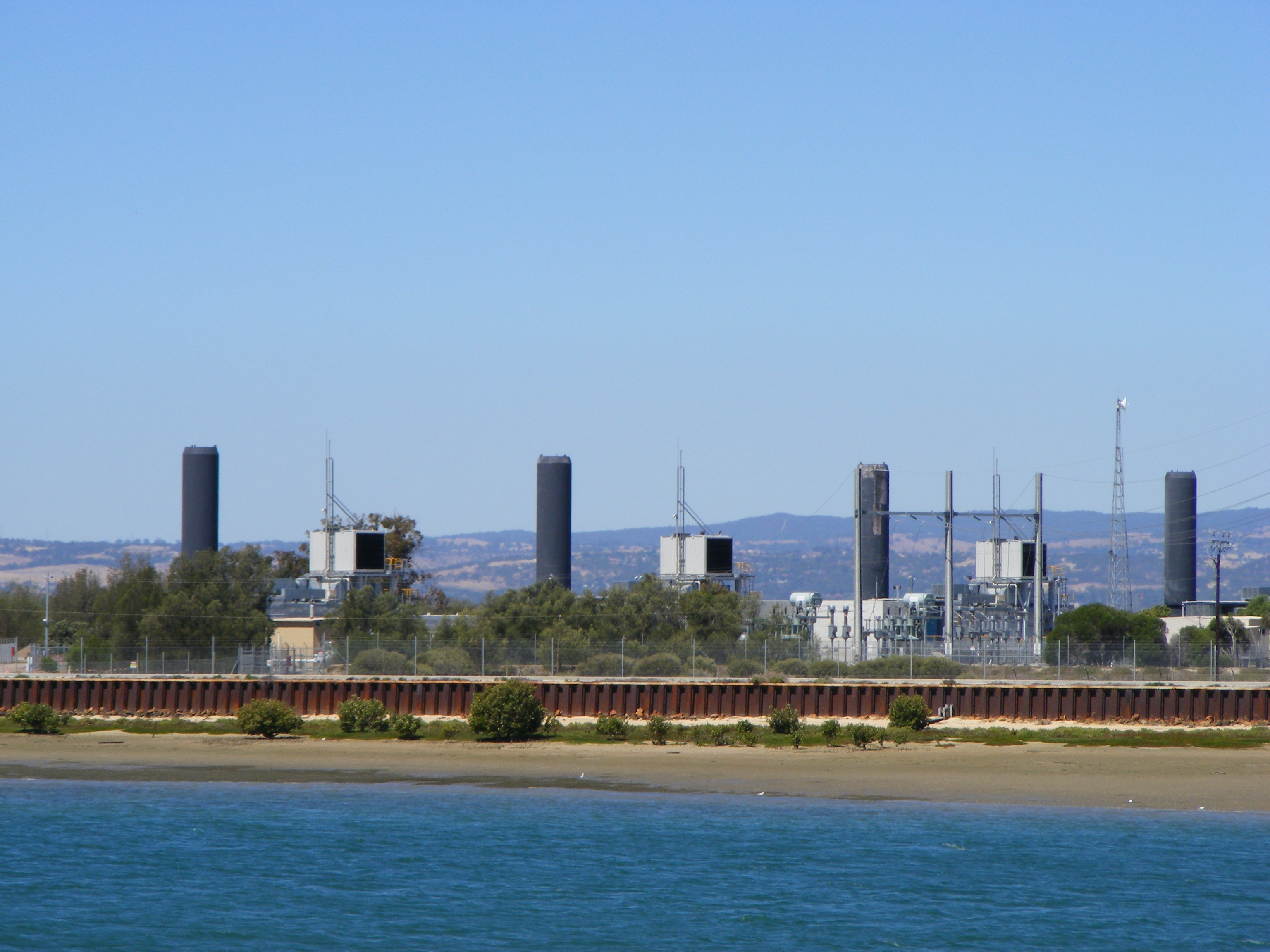
- Quarantine Power Station, Torrens Island

- Coordinates: 34.73°S 138.55°E
- Country: Australia
- State: South Australia
- Established: 29 October 1846

Area
  - Total: 177 km^{2} (68.5 sq mi)
- County: Adelaide
Lands administrative divisions around Port Adelaide
Gulf St Vincent	Port Gawler	Port Gawler
Gulf St Vincent	Port Adelaide	Munno Para
Gulf St Vincent	Yatala	Yatala

The Hundred of Port Adelaide is a cadastral hundred covering the vicinity of Port Adelaide, Lefevre Peninsula and the coast of the central Adelaide Plains south of Gawler River and west of Port Wakefield Road. It is one of the eleven hundreds of the County of Adelaide and was named in 1846 by Governor Frederick Robe.

== Local government ==
The District Council of Yatala was proclaimed in 1853, the first local government body in the hundred. As well as much of the centre of the Hundred of Yatala, it covered a vast undeveloped south eastern swathe of the Hundred of Port Adelaide, including the Dry Creek and North Arm Creek wetlands. In 1868 Yatala council split into Yatala South and Yatala North, the former still covering the semi-industrial townships east of Rosewater within the hundred, such as Wingfield, Grand Junction, and Burford Gardens near Gepps Cross. Yatala North council covered the undeveloped swamplands within the hundred between the Little Para River and Dry Creek until the establishment of the District Council of Salisbury took over local governance of the hundred east of the Barker Inlet and Dry Creek drain in 1933. In the same year Yatala South council was renamed to Enfield.

The Corporate Town of Port Adelaide was established in 1855, the first local government body on Lefevre Peninsula. Seated at Port Adelaide it was joined on the immediate south by the District Council of Portland Estate in 1859, a local government seated at the Portland Estate township which is now part of the modern locality of Port Adelaide. The Portland Estate council was the first of all the local government bodies on Lefevre Peninsula to amalgamate with the Port Adelaide municipality, which it did in 1884.

The District Council of Glanville was established in 1864 along the coast and protruded into the south west extremity of the hundred. The part of Glanville council within the Hundred of Port Adelaide was absorbed into new the Corporate Town of Semaphore in 1884. The District Council of Lefevre's Peninsula was established at Exeter in 1872 but it amalgamated with the Port Adelaide municipality in 1884. The District Council of Birkenhead was established in 1877 by secession from Lefevre's Peninsula council. By 1884, the latter amalgamated with Birkenhead council and in 1886 Birkenhead itself amalgamated with the Port Adelaide municipality.

The District Council of Rosewater on the other side of the Port River estuary was established in 1877. Like the other port-side councils it too was amalgamated with the Port Adelaide municipality in 1889.

In 1890, the municipality of Semaphore was the only remaining local government body on Lefevre Peninsula aside from Port Adelaide. It amalgamated with Port Adelaide municipality in 1900.

When the City of Port Adelaide and City of Enfield were amalgamated in 1996, all of the urbanised parts of the Hundred of Port Adelaide were governed by the same local government body, the City of Port Adelaide Enfield. The non-urbanised portion of the hundred north of the Dry Creek salt pans and west of Port Wakefield Road is still locally governed by the City of Salisbury.

== See also ==
- Lands administrative divisions of South Australia
