= Torrens Island, South Australia =

Locality in South Australia

Torrens Island
- Suburb
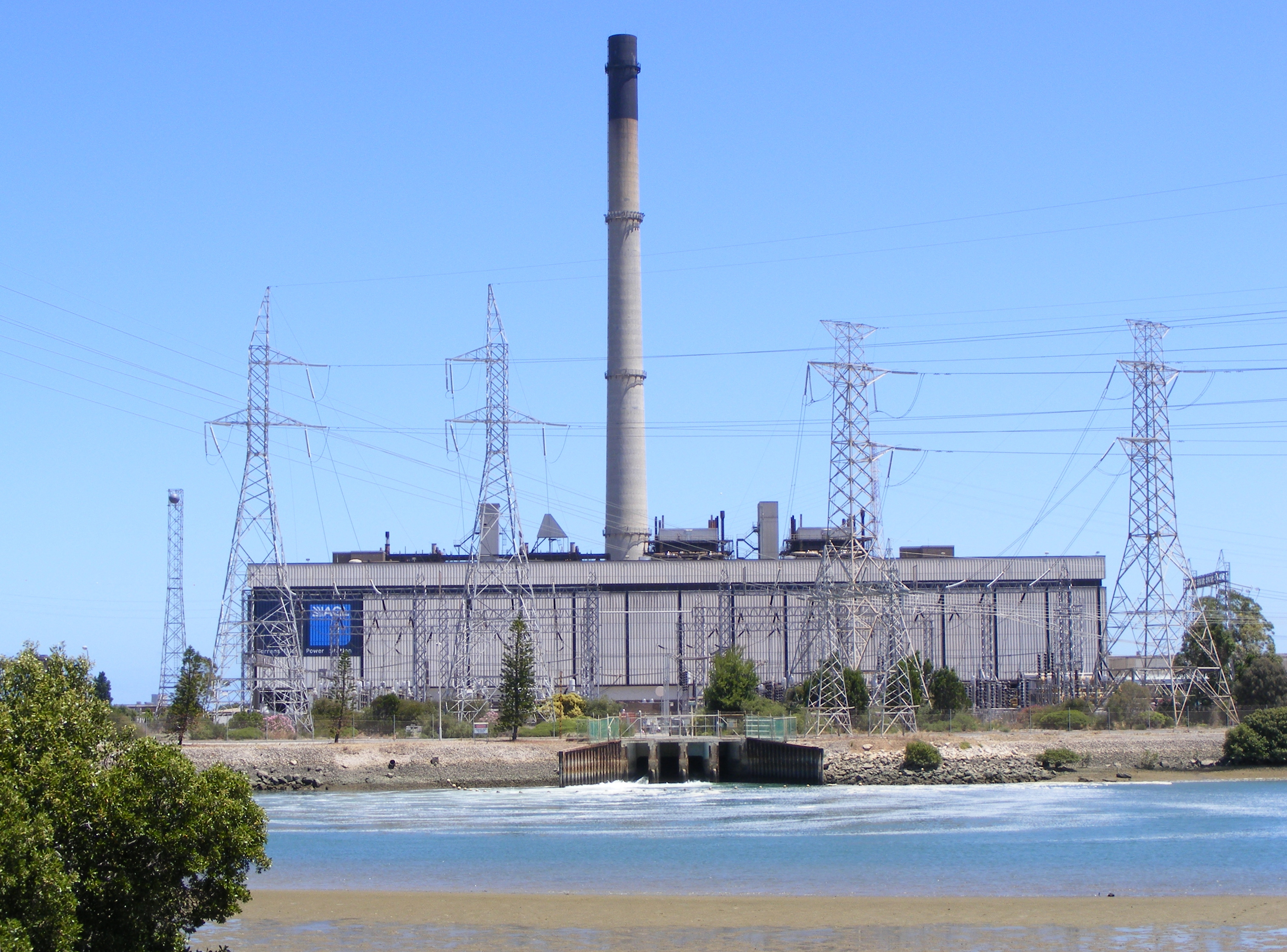
- Torrens Island power station.

- Coordinates: 34.791770°S 138.530640°E
- Country: Australia
- State: South Australia
- Region: Western Adelaide
- LGA: unincorporated area
- Location: 16 km (9.9 mi) north-west of Adelaide city centre
- Established: 2009

Government
  - State electorate: Port Adelaide
  - Federal division: Hindmarsh

Population
  - Total: 0 (2016 census)
- Time zone: UTC+9:30 (ACST)
  - Summer (DST): UTC+10:30 (ACST)
- Postcode: 5015
- County: Adelaide
- Mean max temp: 22.4 °C (72.3 °F)
- Mean min temp: 11.2 °C (52.2 °F)
- Annual rainfall: 451.1 mm (17.76 in)
Suburbs around Torrens Island
Gulf St Vincent	Gulf St Vincent	Barker Inlet
Osborne	Torrens Island	Barker Inlet
Largs North	Port Adelaide	Garden Island
- Coordinates; Climate; Adjoining suburbs

Torrens Island is a locality in the Australian state of South Australia located in the Adelaide metropolitan area within the estuary of the Port River about 16 kilometres (9.9 miles) north-west of the Adelaide city centre.

Its boundaries which were created in August 2009 include “the whole of the geographical feature of Torrens Island” and parts of the following water bodies that adjoin the shoreline of the ‘geographic feature’ - the Port River to the west, the Angas Inlet to the south and the Barker Inlet to the east.

As of 2014, the majority of the land within the locality is zoned as the “MOSS (Conservation) Zone in order to conserve land as part of the Metropolitan Open Space System (MOSS) whose purpose is to define and link “public and privately owned land of an open or natural character in and around metropolitan Adelaide.” The Torrens Island Conservation Park covers most of the land conserved in respect to MOSS. Also, the land associated with both the Torrens Island Power Station and the Torrens Island Quarantine Station is zoned to manage it for the “public purpose” in respect to power generation and the conservation of heritage.

The former Torrens Island Quarantine Station has been listed on the South Australian Heritage Register since 21 October 1993.

The 2016 Australian census which was conducted in August 2016 reports that Torrens Island had a population of zero.

Torrens Island is located within the federal division of Hindmarsh and the state electoral district of Port Adelaide Since at least 2009, Torrens Island has not been located within a local government area.

Torrens Island is linked to the mainland by the Grand Trunkway via a bridge across the North Arm of the Port River to Garden Island and a causeway across Angas Inlet, but as it passes through the Torrens Island Power Station, public access is restricted.

== See also ==
- Torrens (disambiguation)
