= Largs North, South Australia =

Largs North
- Suburb
- Coordinates: 34.816690°S 138.500650°E
- Country: Australia
- State: South Australia
- City: Adelaide
- LGA: City of Port Adelaide Enfield
- Location: 17 km (11 mi) from Adelaide city centre
- Established: 1945

Government
  - State electorate: Port Adelaide
  - Federal division: Hindmarsh

Population
  - Total: 4,005 (SAL 2021)
- Postcode: 5016
Suburbs around Largs North
Gulf St Vincent	Taperoo	Port Adelaide
Gulf St Vincent	Largs North	Port Adelaide
Gulf St Vincent	Largs Bay	Port Adelaide

Largs North is a suburb in the Australian state of South Australia located on the Lefevre Peninsula in the west of Adelaide about 17 kilometres (11 mi) northwest of the Adelaide city centre.

== Description ==
Largs North is bounded to the north by the suburb of Taperoo at Strathfield Terrace, to the south by the suburb of Largs Bay at Walcot and Warwick Streets and in the west and east by Gulf St Vincent and the suburb of Port Adelaide with the boundary in the middle of the Port River respectively.

Largs North is essentially a residential suburb, with a minor harbourside presence on the eastern side of the suburb.

== Facilities ==
The local high school is Ocean View College Gedville Campus, in nearby Taperoo. There is a nursing home on Victoria Road and an RSL club on Carnarvon Terrace. Largs North Oval overlooking Victoria Road is the main outdoor recreational reserve in the suburb.

The eastern side of the suburb, by the Port riverside is known as Snowden Beach and is the former location of a sulphuric acid works, which is connected to a freight railway. There is a swinging basin in the area, and it is the site of Port River Sailing Club and Port Adelaide Rowing Club.

== Transport ==
The 157 and 333 buses service Military Road, while the 150 services Carnarvon Terrace. The suburb is serviced by two train stations on the Outer Harbor railway line, Draper and Largs North stations.

== Governance ==
Largs North is located within the federal division of Hindmarsh, the state electoral district of Port Adelaide and the local government area of the City of Port Adelaide Enfield.
