= Glanville railway station =

Railway station in Adelaide, South Australia

Glanville
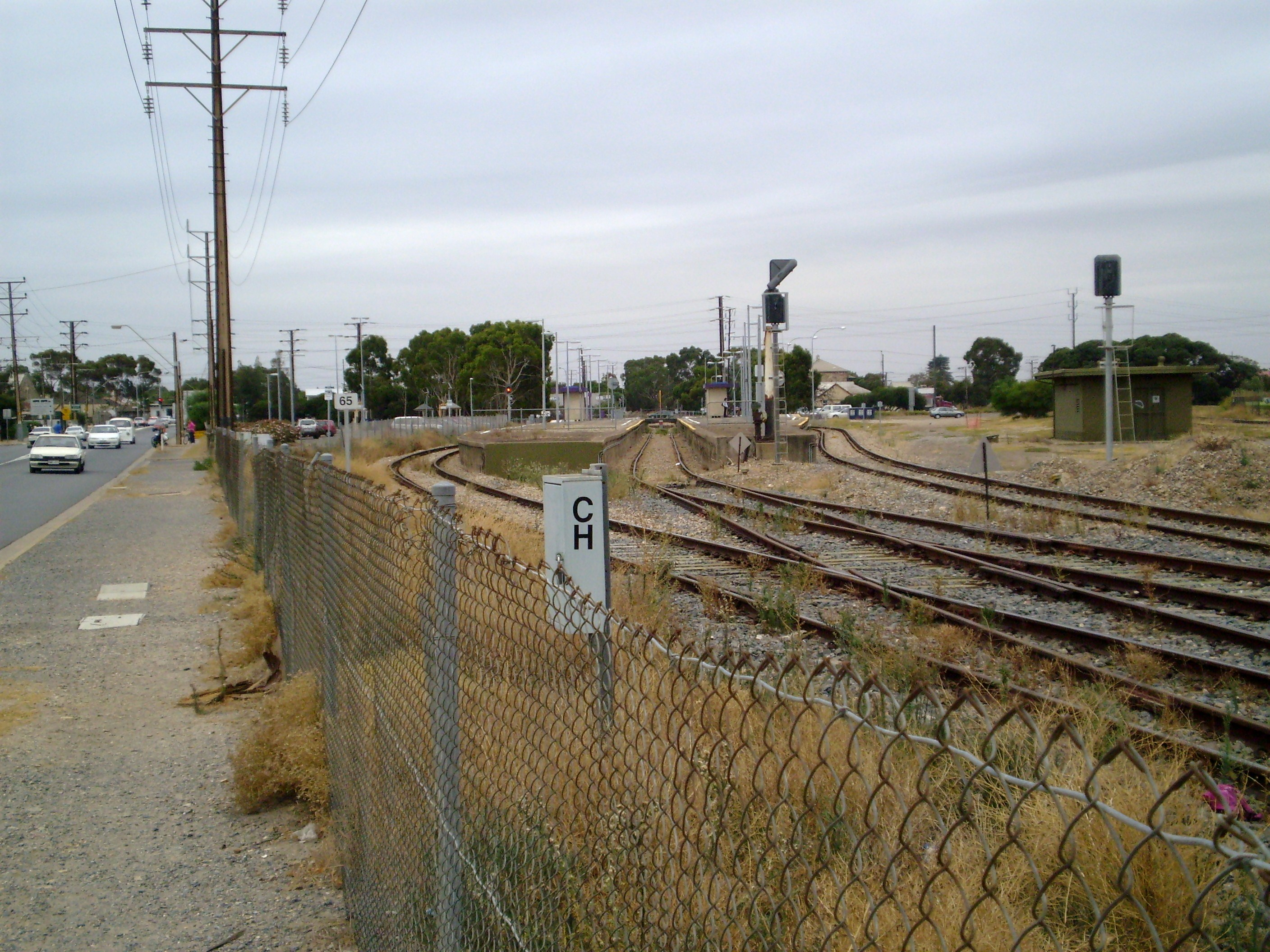
- Northbound view of the station platforms, February 2008

General information
- Location: Causeway Road, Glanville
- Coordinates: 34°50′32″S 138°29′36″E
- Owner: Department for Infrastructure & Transport
- Operator: Adelaide Metro
- Line: Outer Harbor
- Distance: 13.8 km from Adelaide
- Platforms: 4 (2 island)
- Tracks: 3
- Connections: Bus

Construction
- Structure type: Island platform
- Parking: Yes
- Cycle facilities: Yes
- Accessible: Yes

History
- Opened: 1878
- Rebuilt: 1978

Services
Preceding station	Adelaide Metro	Following station
Ethelton towards Adelaide	Outer Harbor line	Peterhead towards Osborne or Outer Harbor
Ethelton towards Adelaide	Outer Harbor line	Terminus
Former services
Preceding station	Disused railways	Following station
Junction	Semaphore line	Exeter towards Semaphore
Location

Glanville railway station is located on the Outer Harbor line. Situated in the north-western Adelaide suburb of Glanville, it is 13.8 kilometres from Adelaide station.

== History ==
The station opened in 1878 after the extension of the Adelaide to Port Adelaide railway to Semaphore. This remained the main line, until the junction at Glanville towards Outer Harbor opened in 1908. The Semaphore branch line ran mainly in the middle of Semaphore Road and remained open until 1978. There was also a junction from Glanville with a track running east then north serving industrial sites along the Port River. The Birkenhead Loop was closed in 2008 when the Mary MacKillop rail bridge opened, and the alignment used to extend Semaphore Road to the Tom 'Diver' Derrick road bridge.

Up until February 2013, a number of peak hour services from Adelaide terminated at Glanville using the bay platform, but they were withdrawn in favour of terminating services at Osborne. Since then, the bay platform has been mostly used for major events in the city that require extra trains (such as an AFL Showdown or the National Pharmacies Christmas Pageant), or for substitute trains whenever a cruise liner is docked at Outer Harbor, because the main train would often be packed. That often results in express service for the main train from Glanville, while the substitute train stops at all stations. That service was suspended during the COVID-19 pandemic.

Starting on 22 April 2018, the bay platform was again used for several morning peak services.

In 2017, during a week-long closure, Glanville station was repainted as part of a program to decorate railway stations across Adelaide.

== Services by platform ==
Platform	Lines	Destinations	Notes
1	Outer Harbor	Outer Harbor	some peak services terminate at Osborne
2	Outer Harbor	Adelaide	some morning peak services start here
3	Outer Harbor	Adelaide	some morning peak services start here
4	Outer Harbor	Adelaide	

== Transport links ==
Bus transfers: Stop 42 (Glanville Interchange)
Route no.	Destination & route details
333	Port Adelaide via Semaphore Road & Nelson Street
333	North Haven via Hart Street & Military Road
