= Taperoo, South Australia =

Taperoo
- Suburb
- Coordinates: 34.806710°S 138.499840°E
- Country: Australia
- State: South Australia
- City: Adelaide
- LGA: City of Port Adelaide Enfield
- Location: 18 km (11 mi) from Adelaide city centre
- Established: 1945

Government
  - State electorate: Port Adelaide
  - Federal division: Hindmarsh

Population
  - Total: 3,250 (SAL 2021)
- Postcode: 5017
Suburbs around Taperoo
| Gulf St Vincent | Osborne | Torrens Island |
| Gulf St Vincent | Taperoo | Torrens Island; Port Adelaide |
| Gulf St Vincent | Largs North | Port Adelaide |

Taperoo /ˈtæpəruː/ is a suburb in the Australian state of South Australia, located on the Lefevre Peninsula in the west of Adelaide, about 18 kilometres (11 mi) north-west of the Adelaide city centre.

== Description ==
Taperoo is adjacent to Osborne and Largs North. It is bounded to the north by Moldavia Walk and Solvay Road, to the south by Strathfield Terrace, and in the west and east by Gulf St Vincent and the Port River respectively. Taperoo is primarily a residential suburb, with a minor harbourside presence on the eastern side of the suburb.

== History ==
Taperoo as a placename was in use by 1920 as a railway siding located "opposite the works of the now defunct Silicate Brick Company, between Outer Harbour and Glanville" was renamed as Taperoo. The name is derived from an Aboriginal word meaning "calm". Part of Taperoo is reported as being "formerly known as Silicate". The name was "formally submitted by the City of Port Adelaide at a council meeting held on 10 May 1945" and was formally adopted in 1951 by the Nomenclature Committee. In January 2007, a portion was excluded and added to the suburb of Largs North. In August 2009, its eastern boundary was extended to the centre of the Port River.

Osborneville Post Office, opened around 1922, was renamed Taperoo on 1 February 1964 and North Haven in 1989.

== Facilities ==
The suburb is served by Ocean View College P-12 (formerly Taperoo High School) on Gedville Road and Our Lady of the Visitation Catholic Primary School. The suburb is the location of historic Fort Largs, including the former Fort Largs Police Academy, which had been the training facility for South Australia Police. The heritage-listed Fort Largs site, together with a parcel of coastal frontage land immediately to the north and also formerly part of the Police Academy site, was placed on the market by the state government in 2014 to recoup the cost of constructing new Police Academy buildings.

Further to the north, the site is bordered by a former sand quarry in the coastal foredune, officially known as White Hollow Reserve but popularly known as the "Snakepit". The area contains a sandhill running circuit, established by local activist Robert Crouch, with 392 metres (1,286 ft) of tracks used by sporting clubs and locals.

Roy Marten Park, the primary recreational reserve in the suburb, lies to the north of the Fort Largs Police Academy, between the "Snakepit" and Military Road. A major upgrade of the park started in 2016.

== Governance ==
Taperoo is located within the federal division of Hindmarsh, the state electoral district of Port Adelaide and the local government area of the City of Port Adelaide Enfield.

== See also ==
- List of Adelaide suburbs
