= Pelican Point, Adelaide =

Coordinates: 34°45′47″S 138°30′18″E

Location of Pelican Point in South Australia

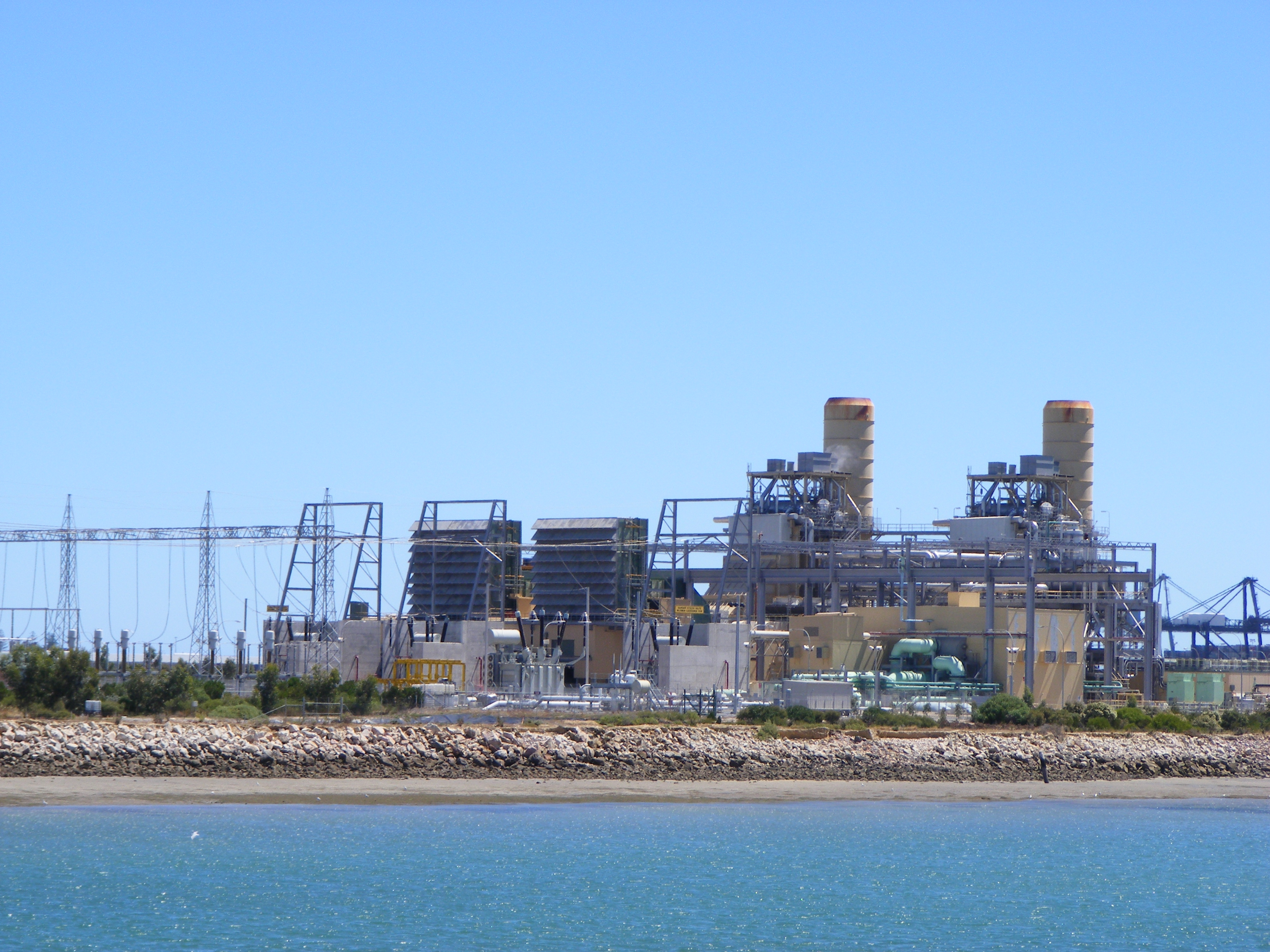
Pelican Point power station

Pelican Point is at the northern tip of Lefevre Peninsula, adjacent to the Port River shipping channel and the container terminal and associated infrastructure at Outer Harbor. A non-residential area, it is undergoing considerable industrial development, which is expected to continue as other projects, such as the Port River Expressway, come to fruition.

Light Passage, named after founder of Adelaide Colonel William Light, lies in the Port Adelaide River between Pelican Point and Torrens Island.

There is a ship's graveyard site at the northern end of Mutton Cove, near Pelican Point, there being a steel hulk of a steamship on the beach.

== See also ==
- Pelican Point Power Station
