= Osborne, South Australia =

Osborne
- Suburb
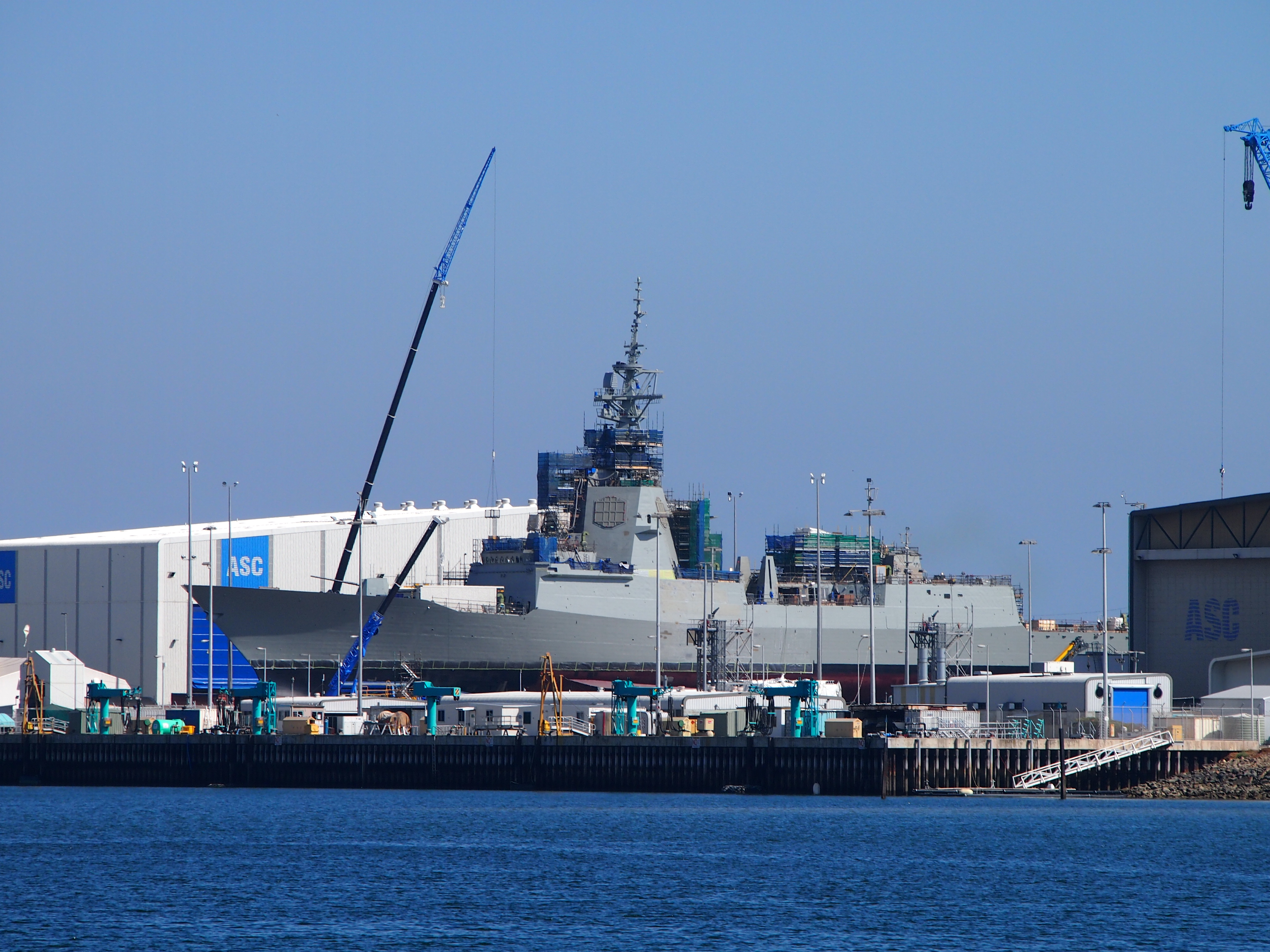
- HMAS Hobart under construction at Osborne, 10 April 2015.

- Coordinates: 34°47′43″S 138°30′17″E
- Country: Australia
- State: South Australia
- Region: Western Adelaide
- City: Adelaide
- LGA: City of Port Adelaide Enfield
- Location: 21 km (13 mi) from Adelaide city centre

Government
  - State electorate: Port Adelaide
  - Federal division: Hindmarsh

Population
  - Total: 1,951 (SAL 2021)
- Time zone: UTC+9:30 (ACST)
  - Summer (DST): UTC+10:30 (ACST)
- Postcode: 5017
- County: Adelaide
- Mean max temp: 22.5 °C (72.5 °F)
- Mean min temp: 11.2 °C (52.2 °F)
- Annual rainfall: 451.2 mm (17.76 in)
Suburbs around Osborne
Gulf St Vincent	Torrens Island	Torrens Island
Outer Harbor; North Haven; Gulf St Vincent	Osborne	Torrens Island
Gulf St Vincent	Taperoo	Torrens Island

Osborne is a suburb in the Australian state of South Australia located on the Lefevre Peninsula in the west of Adelaide about 21 kilometres (13 miles) north-west of the Adelaide city centre.

== Description ==
Osborne is bounded to the south by the suburb of Taperoo, to the west by Gulf St Vincent and to the north west by the suburbs of North Haven and Outer Harbor and to the east by the suburb of Torrens Island.

== History ==
Osborne originally started as a private sub-division in Section 2015 in the cadastral unit of the Hundred of Port Adelaide. It was named after Captain R.W. Osborne (c.1834-1920). A portion was subsequently added to North Haven. The name was "formally submitted by the City of Port Adelaide at a council meeting held on 10 May 1945" and was formally adopted in 1951 by the Nomenclature Committee. Since 1951, its boundaries have varied as follows. A portion was renamed as North Haven while another portion was added to the suburb of North Haven. In March 2006, its boundaries were varied to ensure that the Osborne Maritime Precinct was within its boundaries. In August 2009, its eastern boundary was extended to the centre of the Port River.

Osborneville Post Office opened around 1922; it was renamed Taperoo on 1 February 1964, and North Haven in 1989. Osborne was also known as Brooklyn after the name change from Osborneville.

== Industries ==
Osborne is the home of a number of industrial employers, including

- ASC Pty Ltd, a naval ship builder notable for the Royal Australian Navy's Collins class submarines and Hobart-class destroyers.
- Osborne Power Station, a gas-fired power station.
- Flinders Ports which has two port facilities located on the suburb's coast with the Port River.

== Community services ==
Osborne is the home of LeFevre Reserve, which also hosts a community centre.

There are no schools in the suburb. The closest schools are in the adjacent suburbs of North Haven (North Haven School R-7) and Taperoo (Ocean View College B-12), (originally Taperoo High School).

== Transport ==
Adelaide Metro provides two bus services that directly serve the suburb – route 333 that runs between the suburb and Port Adelaide and route 150 that starts on Victoria Road within the suburb and continues to the Adelaide city centre.

The Outer Harbor railway line has two stations that serving the suburb – Midlunga railway station and the Osborne railway station which is located nearby in the suburb of North Haven. Osborne is also traversed by the Dry Creek–Port Adelaide railway line which carries freight to the Outer Harbor container and grain export terminals via the Mary MacKillop Bridge.

== Governance ==
Osborne is located within the federal division of Hindmarsh, the state electoral district of Port Adelaide and the local government area of the City of Port Adelaide Enfield.

== See also ==
- List of cities and towns in South Australia
- Penrice Soda Products
- Mutton Cove Conservation Reserve
