= Lefevre Peninsula =

Lefevre Peninsula South Australia
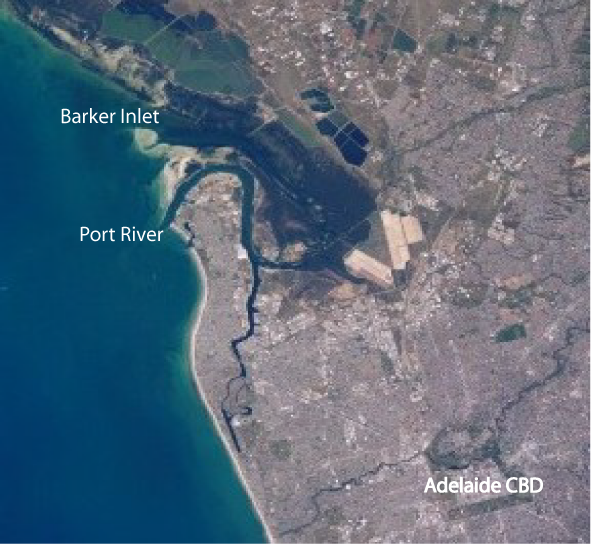
- The Lefevre Peninsula is on the west side of the Port River

- Coordinates: 34°48′33″S 138°29′49″E
- LGA(s): City of Port Adelaide Enfield
- Region: Western Adelaide
- County: Adelaide
- State electorate(s): Lee; Port Adelaide
- Federal division(s): Hindmarsh

The Lefevre Peninsula is a peninsula located in the Australian state of South Australia located about 15 kilometres (9.3 mi) northwest of the Adelaide city centre. It is a narrow sand spit of about 30 square kilometres (12 sq mi) running north from its connection to the mainland.

The name given to the peninsula by the traditional owners of the area, the Kaurna people, was Mudlangga, meaning "nose-place" in the Kaurna language.

== Location and extent ==
Lefevre Peninsula, with a population of approximately 30,000 residents, is located on the east coast of Gulf St Vincent about 15 kilometres (9.3 mi) north-west of the Adelaide city centre. The peninsula is bounded to the west by Gulf St Vincent and to the north and the east by the Port River. The southern boundary of the “topographical peninsula” has been determined by the Surveyor General of South Australia as being Recreation Road in the suburb of Semaphore Park as “an examination of old plans indicate that boats could have navigated the Port Adelaide River to approximately this point”.

Suburbs on the Lefevre Peninsula include: Semaphore, Semaphore Park, Semaphore South, Ethelton, Glanville, New Port, Exeter, Birkenhead, Peterhead, Largs Bay, Largs North, Taperoo, Osborne, North Haven & Outer Harbor.

== Description ==
The western, Gulf St Vincent, coast of the peninsula consists of a continuous stretch of fine, white sand beaches. The eastern side is defined and separated from the mainland by the Barker Inlet and Port River. Torrens Island lies nearby to the east. To the east of the base of the peninsula is the suburb of Port Adelaide. Much of the peninsula has been developed, with residential areas extending inland from the western beaches, and heavy industries concentrated along the Port River waterfront on its eastern shore.

The peninsula has strong maritime associations due to its proximity to Port Adelaide, the Port River and Outer Harbor. Collins class submarines were built at the suburb of Osborne. Cement production occurs on the peninsula at Birkenhead. In 1999, the Pelican Point Power Station was established at the northeastern tip of the peninsula adjacent to the Port River.

Lefevre Peninsula also contains several sailing clubs and golf clubs and the popular Semaphore Road foreshore. The Outer Harbor railway line runs through the peninsula from Ethelton to Outer Harbor and is now solely a passenger railway. A separate freight railway enters the peninsula over the Mary MacKillop Bridge and runs up the eastern side of the peninsula to the bulk grain and container berths at Pelican Point. Prior to the bridge construction in 2008, this line was serviced by the Birkenhead Loop which branched from the Outer Harbor line near Glanville railway station.

== Naming ==
Before the British colonisation of South Australia, the Kaurna people called the peninsula Mudlangga, meaning "nose-place" in the Kaurna language, possibly referring to the nose of a kangaroo.

It was given its present name by John Hindmarsh, then Governor of South Australia, on 3 June 1837 after Sir John George Shaw Lefevre, who was one of South Australia's Colonisation Commissioners.

== History ==
Before it was developed, much of the coastline was covered with mangroves. The land was extensively covered with bush, with such plants as wattle, sheoak and other native species. The eastern side of the peninsula formed part of the estuarine ecosystem of the Port River.

=== European use ===
European settlement commenced in the early 1840s.

== Governance ==
The Lefevre Peninsula is located within the local government area of the City of Port Adelaide Enfield, the state electoral districts of Lee and Port Adelaide and the federal division of Hindmarsh.

The following suburbs are located on the Lefevre Peninsula: Birkenhead, Ethelton, Exeter, Glanville, Largs Bay, Largs North, New Port, North Haven, Osborne, Outer Harbor, Peterhead, Semaphore, the northern end of Semaphore Park, Semaphore South and Taperoo.

== See also ==
- Lefèvre
- District Council of Lefevre's Peninsula
