= Outer Harbor railway station =

Railway station in Adelaide, South Australia

Outer Harbor
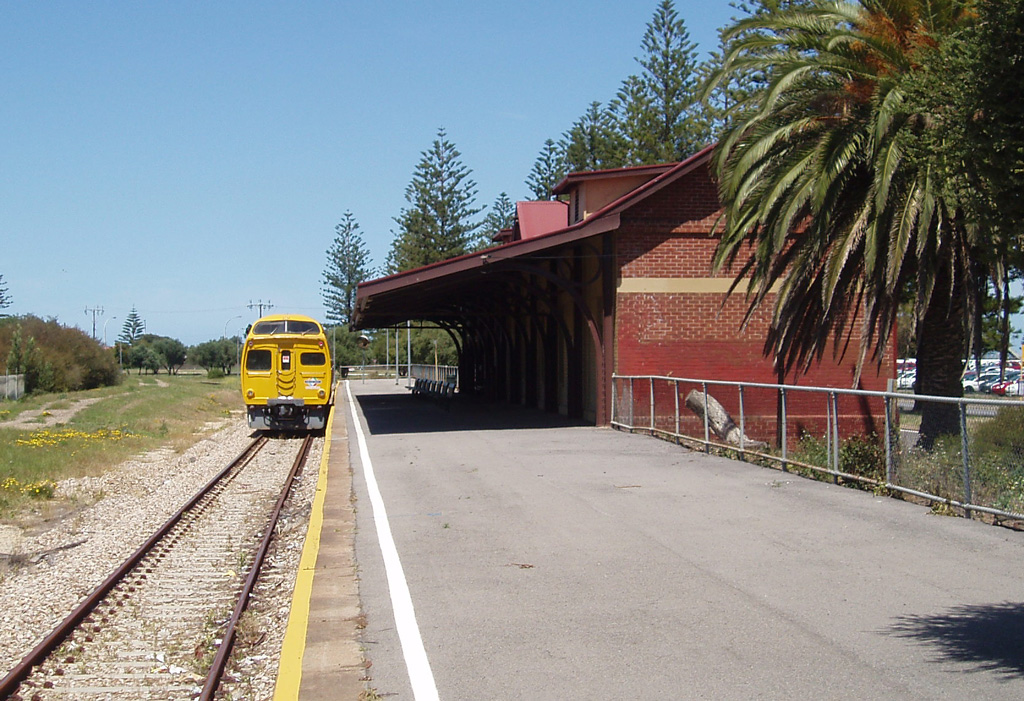
- North-east bound view from the station platform, with a 2000 class railcar at the platform, November 2005

General information
- Location: Oliver Rogers Road, North Haven
- Coordinates: 34°46′42″S 138°29′03″E
- Owner: Department for Infrastructure & Transport
- Operator: Adelaide Metro
- Line: Outer Harbor
- Distance: 21.9 km from Adelaide
- Platforms: 1
- Bus routes: None

Construction
- Structure type: Side platform
- Parking: Yes
- Cycle facilities: No
- Accessible: Yes

History
- Opened: 1926 (current station)

Services
Preceding station	Adelaide Metro	Following station
North Haven towards Adelaide	Outer Harbor line	Terminus
Location

Outer Harbor railway station is the terminus station of the Outer Harbor line. Situated in the north-western Adelaide suburb of North Haven, it is 21.9 kilometres from Adelaide station.

== History ==
Port facilities at Outer Harbor were constructed during the first decade of the 20th century. This involved reclamation of marshland and the building of wharves and breakwaters. A railway line was built northwards from Largs in 1903 to facilitate this construction. The line was initially single track and used by goods trains only. As the harbour project reached completion, a station was erected alongside the wharf at Outer Harbor and a passenger service was introduced in late 1907. Outer Harbor opened to ocean-going shipping in January 1908.

=== Current location ===
In 1926, a new passenger station with brick buildings was built on the present site and allowed the lines closer to the wharf to concentrate on handling goods traffic. The original station was closer to the wharf than the current station location, in the area now occupied by the modern Overseas Passenger Terminal. There were various goods lines on the wharf in addition to the passenger facilities, and a sizeable balloon loop which around the circumference of the North Haven Golf Course and allowed passenger trains to continue back towards Adelaide without reversing.

Before the 1950s, the train service to Outer Harbor comprised:

- A regular all-stations shuttle service along the peninsula which connected at Glanville with the suburban trains between Adelaide and Semaphore.
- Several peak-hour local trains between Adelaide and Outer Harbor.
- Special express boat trains which ran to and from Outer Harbor to connect with the arrival and departure of ocean-going ships. Many of these trains were shunted onto the wharf lines to enable passengers to transfer directly to and from the ships.

In 1959, increasing traffic from stations along the Lefevre Peninsula resulted in the Outer Harbor line becoming the main line, with most trains running to or from Adelaide, with the Semaphore trains then operating as a shuttle service from Glanville. However, during the late 1960s and 1970s, the importance of the passenger facilities decreased. Today, the Overseas Passenger Terminal is now used only for short stop-overs by occasional cruise ships. The last boat train ran to Outer Harbor in 1971, and the ticket office at was closed in 1979.

The goods lines directly into the wharf were disconnected in 1974 when the railway lines approaching Outer Harbor were relocated to the northern side of Lady Ruthven Drive. Goods trains continued to access the wharf by reversing from the north end of the balloon loop. In the mid-1970s, a separate freight line was built to service the port area at Outer Harbor. This was an extension of the industrial line at Osborne and followed the western bank of the Port River to Pelican Point. By 1982, all freight trains used the industrial line. The connection between the wharves and Outer Harbor station was removed and the Outer Harbor line was used solely by suburban passenger trains. In the late 1980s, a resignalling scheme resulted in decommissioning of the balloon loop and the singling of the last three kilometres of track north of Midlunga.

== Services by platform ==
Platform	Lines	Destinations	Notes
1	Outer Harbor	all stops services to Adelaide	Terminus
