= Outer Harbor and Port Dock lines =

Railway line in Adelaide, South Australia

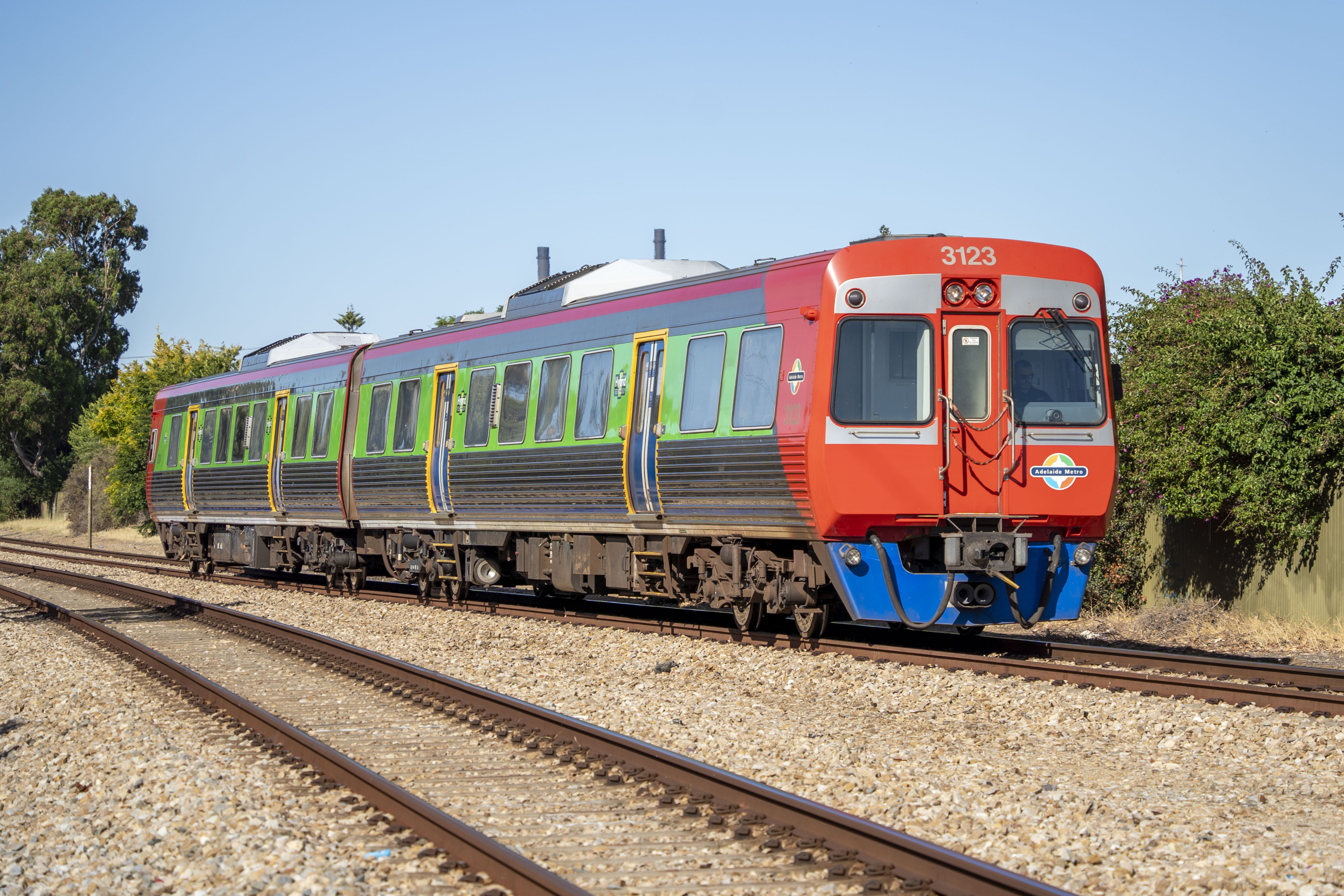
- 3100 class railcar approaching Largs North in December 2024

Overview
- Locale: Adelaide, South Australia
- Termini: Adelaide; Port Dock; Osborne (peak only); Outer Harbor
- Stations: 23

Service
- Type: Commuter rail
- Route number: OSBORN, OUTHA, PTDOCK
- Operator: Adelaide Metro
- Rolling stock: 3000/3100 class

History
- Opened: 1856 (to Port Dock); 1908 (to Outer Harbor)

Technical
- Line length: 21.9 km (13.6 mi)
- Number of tracks: 2 (to Midlunga); 1 (Midlunga to Outer Harbor)
- Track gauge: 1,600 mm (5 ft 3 in)

The Outer Harbor line is a suburban commuter service in Adelaide, South Australia, that runs from Adelaide station through the north western suburbs to Port Adelaide and Outer Harbor.

The Port Dock line is a service that shares its route with the Outer Harbor line until north of Alberton, where it branches along a 1.0 kilometre (0.62 miles) spur to Port Dock station in Port Adelaide.

== History ==
Opening in 1856, the inaugural 11.9 kilometres (7.4 miles) railway between Adelaide and Port Dock railway station — named Port Adelaide until 1916 — was the second railway in the colony of South Australia, and the first government-owned railway in the British Empire. Port Adelaide junction was created when the railway was extended to cross the Port River to Le Fevre Peninsula. As industry developed on the west side of the Port River, a deeper harbour was required. Initially, this was at Semaphore, with the railway extended in 1882 as the now-closed Semaphore railway line to service the overseas shipping jetty there. The line was subsequently extended 11.2 kilometres (7.0 miles) to Outer Harbor.

The original Port Dock station was closed in 1981, with part of its site later repurposed for the National Railway Museum. Some land was reclaimed for track leading to, and platforms of, a new-build station in 2024.

=== 21st century renewal ===
The line between Port Adelaide Junction and Glanville was dual gauge until December 2009, when the standard gauge rails were removed. Outer Harbor was configured as a balloon loop so that trains could make the return journey without shunting, requiring a turntable or triangle, or requiring the driver to change ends. The loop was cut when rail freight moved off the broad-gauge Outer Harbor railway to the nearby standard-gauge line on the eastern side of the peninsula.

Various plans to modify the line have been proposed. In 2008, the state government announced a plan to rebuild the Outer Harbor line in preparation for the line to be electrified with the federal government also to provide funding. In the 2011 budget, it was announced that electrification of the Outer Harbor line had been deferred until 2016. In June 2012, the project was cancelled.

The state government again considered electrifying the line or converting it to light rail. A 2016 report into potential light rail projects in Adelaide considered two options for the future of the line. The first would electrify the heavy-rail line and provide a short spur-line to central Port Adelaide (Port Dock). The option would convert the line to light rail and add a new on-street branch to Semaphore; a light rail conversion would also require the conversion or closure of the Grange line, and several options for the future of that line were also presented. The spur line and a new Port Dock station, after several delays and costing increases, began construction in June 2023 and were opened in September 2024.

In January 2017, the line was closed for three weeks alongside the Grange line to building an overpass over South Road and the North–South Motorway.

In 2024, transport minister Tom Koutsantonis flagged another possible electrification and an extension of the line to accommodate workers at the Australian Submarine Corporation at Osborne.

=== Torrens Junction separation ===
There are a total of five railway tracks on three bridges in parallel across the River Torrens. North of this bridge, the two tracks of the Gawler line continues north, as does the standard gauge interstate railway track, while the two tracks of the Outer Harbor and Grange lines swing away northwest. Originally, this was a flat junction with Outer Harbor and Grange trains crossing the interstate tracks that carry rail freight between Melbourne and the main freight terminals in Adelaide, Perth and Darwin.

In May 2016, the state government announced that 1.4 kilometres (0.87 mi) of the line would be lowered in a grade separation project to pass below the Adelaide to Port Augusta and Gawler lines and continuing under Park Terrace; a new Bowden station would be built in the lowered portion of the rail corridor. In 2016 the contract was awarded to a consortium of Laing O'Rourke, AECOM and KBR.

The Torrens Rail Junction Project commenced construction in 2017. The entire Outer Harbor and Grange lines were closed along with a portion of the Gawler line in April, June, July, and August 2017 for initial construction works. The entire line was closed on 24 September 2017, and reopened on 15 January 2018, having been delayed from a 3 December opening.

== Former branch lines ==
- Semaphore railway line (closed 29 October 1978) Branched from the Outer Harbor line at Glanville station, traversing Jetty Road to the pier / jetty.
- Finsbury railway line (closed 17 August 1979) Branched from the Outer Harbor line starting Woodville station.

== Route ==
The line is double track from Adelaide to Midlunga, then single for the final three kilometres to Outer Harbor; the spur line to Port Dock is single track with a passing loop. The northern section of the line runs along the middle of the narrow Lefevre Peninsula with stations at regular intervals. The line serves 22 stations in 22 kilometres (14 miles).

=== Line guide ===
Outer Harbor and Port Dock Lines
| Name | Distance from Adelaide | Year opened | Serving suburbs | Connections |
|---|---|---|---|---|
| Adelaide | 0.0 km | 1856 | Adelaide | Belair Flinders Gawler; Seaford Bus Tram |
| Bowden | 2.4 km | 1856 | Bowden | |
| Croydon | 4.2 km | 1888 | Croydon | |
| West Croydon | 5.1 km | 1915 | West Croydon | |
| Kilkenny | 6.0 km | 1881 | Kilkenny, Woodville Park | |
| Woodville Park | 6.8 km | 1936 | Woodville, Woodville Park | |
| Woodville | 7.5 km | 1856 | St Clair, Woodville | Grange Bus |
| St Clair | 8.6 km | 2014 | St Clair, Woodville | |
| Cheltenham | 9.2 km | 1959 | Cheltenham | |
| Alberton | 10.2 km | 1856 | Alberton | |
Port Dock Line
| Port Dock | 12.0 km | 2024 | Port Adelaide | Bus Interchange |
Outer Harbor Line
| Port Adelaide | 11.7 km | 1916 | Port Adelaide | Bus |
| Ethelton | 13.1 km | 1916 | Ethelton, New Port | |
| Glanville | 13.8 km | 1878 | Glanville, New Port | Bus |
| Peterhead | 14.6 km | 1911 | Birkenhead, Exeter, Peterhead | |
| Largs | 15.5 km | 1907 | Largs Bay | |
| Largs North | 16.4 km | 1916 | Largs North | |
| Draper | 17.2 km | Unknown | Largs North | |
| Taperoo | 18.2 km | 1908 | Taperoo | |
| Midlunga | 18.8 km | 1921 | Osborne | |
| Osborne | 19.6 km | 1908 | North Haven, Osborne | |
| North Haven | 20.5 km | 1981 | North Haven | |
| Outer Harbor | 21.9 km | 1926 | North Haven, Outer Harbor | |

== Services ==
The Outer Harbor and Port Dock lines shares part of their route with the Grange line. All passenger train services are operated by 3000/3100 class railcars. Trains run every 30 minutes between 5am and midnight on weekdays and weekends.

Prior to the reopening of Port Dock railway station, most services on the Outer Harbor line stopped at all stations. From 25 August 2024, Port Dock services stop at all stations, while most Outer Harbor services will run express between Adelaide and Woodville while also skipping Cheltenham.

=== Additional services ===
During special events, such as AFL matches, Adelaide Metro will typically run extra Osborne services. Unlike the regular weekday peak services, these Osborne services stop at all stations.

As Outer Harbor railway station is in close proximity to the Port Adelaide Passenger Terminal, the Outer Harbor line is regularly utilised by cruise ship passengers during the summer cruise season. When larger cruise ships are in port, Adelaide Metro often runs an express train service between Outer Harbor and Adelaide.
