= Osborne railway station =

Railway station in Adelaide, South Australia

Osborne
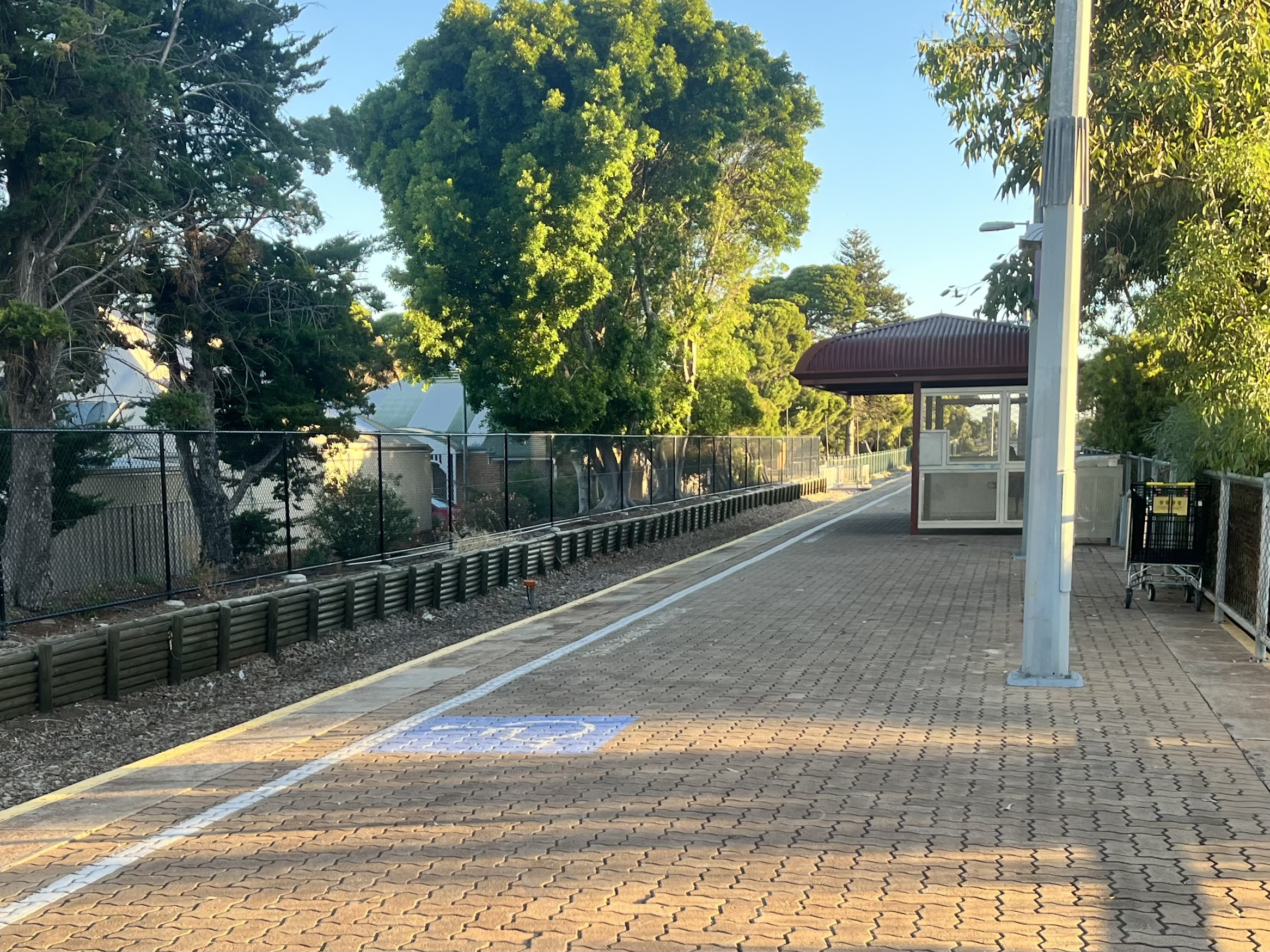
- Southbound view from the station platform, February 2024

General information
- Location: Osborne Road, Osborne
- Coordinates: 34°47′35″S 138°29′57″E
- Owner: Department for Infrastructure & Transport
- Operator: Adelaide Metro
- Line: Outer Harbor
- Distance: 19.6 km from Adelaide
- Platforms: 1
- Tracks: 1
- Connections: Bus

Construction
- Structure type: Ground
- Parking: Yes
- Cycle facilities: No
- Accessible: Yes

History
- Opened: 30 November 1908
- Rebuilt: 1980s

Services
Preceding station	Adelaide Metro	Following station
Midlunga towards Adelaide	Outer Harbor line	North Haven towards Outer Harbor
Midlunga towards Adelaide	Outer Harbor line Osborne service	Terminus
Location

Osborne railway station is located on the Outer Harbor line. Situated in the north-western Adelaide suburb of Osborne, it is 19.6 kilometres from Adelaide station.

== History ==
This station was opened on 30 November 1908.

Just south of the station, the line from Adelaide becomes single track for the remainder of the journey to Outer Harbor. It once had two platforms but one closed in the 1980s when the balloon loop north was removed. The unused track was gradually removed, with the last remnants at the level crossing next to the station pulled up in July 2019. Just south of the station, the ICI Osborne railway line branched off to the ICI Osborne works (later owned by Penrice Soda Products). This had industrial passenger service until 1980 and has since been dismantled. Some peak hour services from Adelaide terminate at Osborne.

== Services by platform ==
Platform	Lines	Destinations	Notes
1	Outer Harbor	all stops services to Outer Harbor/Adelaide	some peak hour services terminate this station

== Transport links ==
Bus transfers: Stop 60 (Victoria Road)
Route no.	Destination & route details
150	City via Victoria Road, Carnarvon Terrace, Fletcher Road & Port Road

Bus transfers: Stop 59 (Military Road)
Route no.	Destination & route details
333	Port Adelaide via Military Road, Hart Street, Glanville station & Semaphore Road
