= Department for Infrastructure and Transport =

South Australian government department

Department overview
- Formed: 7 August 2020
- Preceding agencies: Department of Planning, Transport and Infrastructure; Department for Transport, Energy and Infrastructure; Department of Transport and Urban Planning; Department for Transport, Urban Planning and the Arts
- Jurisdiction: Government of South Australia
- Headquarters: 83 Pirie Street, Adelaide
- Employees: 2,281 (2024)
- Annual budget: A$2.05 billion (2023–2024)
- Ministers responsible: The Hon. Joe Szakacs MP, Minister for Infrastructure and Transport; The Hon. Michael Brown MP, Minister for Police
- Department executive: Jon Whelan, Chief Executive
- Website: www.dit.sa.gov.au

The Department for Infrastructure and Transport (DIT) is a department of the Government of South Australia.

It is responsible for maintaining, expanding and operating the statewide road network. In addition to road transport, the department is also responsible for strategic planning and delivery of social and civil infrastructure, marine projects and public transport.

The department also manages policy initiatives and community information for safe road use and travel behaviour. It does this by overseeing regulatory, road safety and policy responsibilities.

== Ministers ==
As of 25 March 2026, the ministers responsible for its operations are:

Minister	Party	Portfolio
Joe Szakacs	Labor	Minister for Infrastructure and Transport
Michael Brown	Labor	Minister for Police (with responsibility for road safety)

== Key responsibilities ==
=== Public transport services ===
The department manages bus, train and tram services in South Australia. This includes the route design, timetabling and branding of these services. The public transport services are branded as Adelaide Metro, which provides a trip planner and transport service information on its website.

=== Registration and licensing services ===
The department manages South Australian registration and licensing transactions for motor vehicles and recreational boating. These services are branded as Service SA.

=== Major infrastructure projects ===
The department delivers infrastructure projects and transport improvements for South Australia.

As of 2025, some key infrastructure projects include:

- North-South Corridor (River Torrens to Darlington (T2D) Project)
- Fleurieu Connections (Main South Road and Victor Harbor Road duplication)
- Northern Water (Spencer Gulf seawater desalination plant)
- Southern Expressway (Majors Road Interchange)
- Freight Highway Upgrade Program
- Tram Grade Separation Projects.
