= District Council of Portland Estate =

District Council of Portland Estate South Australia
- Coordinates: 34.8514°S 138.5077°E
- Established: 1859
- Abolished: 1884
LGAs around District Council of Portland Estate:
Glanville	Port Adelaide	Port Adelaide
Glanville	District Council of Portland Estate	Yatala; Yatala South; Rosewater
Hindmarsh; Woodville	Hindmarsh; Woodville	Queenstown and Alberton

The District Council of Portland Estate was a local government area of South Australia established in 1859 and abolished in 1884. It was seated at the Portland Estate subdivision, immediately south of the modern township of Port Adelaide.

== History ==
The council was proclaimed on 15 September 1859. It included sections 1128 through 1131 on the boundary of the hundreds of Port Adelaide and Yatala. This being the land south of the Tam O'Shanter Creek and east of the Old Port Reach (Port Creek), stretching eastwards to modern Commercial Road and southwards to Webb Street, the modern boundary of Port Adelaide and Queenstown

The council was amalgamated in to the Corporate Town of Port Adelaide on 4 December 1884.
