= Rosewater, South Australia =

Rosewater
- Suburb
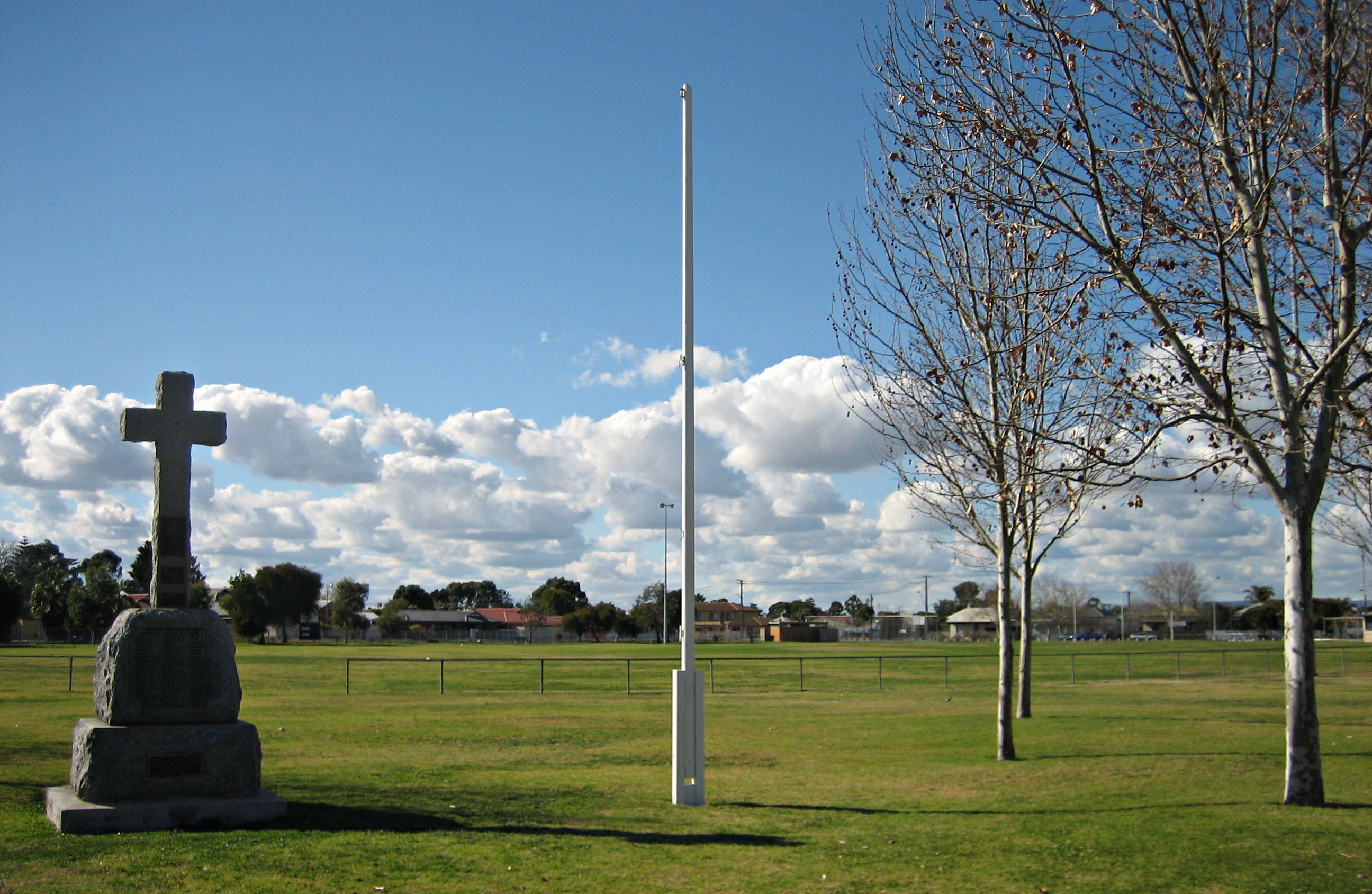
- Eric Sutton Oval

- Coordinates: 34°51′14″S 138°31′13″E
- Country: Australia
- State: South Australia
- Region: Western Adelaide
- City: Adelaide
- LGAs: City of Port Adelaide Enfield; City of Charles Sturt
- Location: 12 km (7.5 mi) NW of Adelaide city centre
- Established: 1855

Government
  - State electorate: Cheltenham Port Adelaide
  - Federal division: Hindmarsh

Area
  - Total: 1.4 km^{2} (0.54 sq mi)

Population
  - Total: 3,582 (SAL 2021)
- Time zone: UTC+9:30 (ACST)
  - Summer (DST): UTC+10:30 (ACST)
- Postcode: 5013
- County: Adelaide
Suburbs around Rosewater
Port Adelaide	Port Adelaide; Gillman	Gillman
Port Adelaide; Alberton	Rosewater	Ottoway; Pennington
Alberton	Alberton; Cheltenham; Pennington	Pennington

Rosewater is one of the western suburbs of Adelaide and is located 10 km north-west of Adelaide's central business district. Although mainly residential, there are many shops along Grand Junction Road and the closed Rosewater Loop railway line runs through the suburb. Rosewater is split in half by Grand Junction Road and bordered on the east by Addison Road, and on the south by Torrens Road.

Originally, the area was mainly used as vegetable and dairy farmland but became more and more residential as the railway lines and Grand Junction Road were completed and as Port Adelaide grew and developed. Rosewater was also the site of the AdelaideRadio (VIA) maritime radio station system from 1912 to 1963.

== History ==
Prior to European settlement, the area was inhabited by the Kaurna people. They called the general area north of the Torrens River Yatala retained in an early land division in the area and the cadastral Hundred of Yatala which is the lands administration unit defining real estate boundaries in the southern half of Rosewater and more than a hundred other suburbs north of the Torrens. Further north, the area was known as Yertabulti and Yerta Boldingga, which means 'land of sleep or death' according to John Phillip Gell.

The original subdivision of Rosewater was created in 1855 by Philip Levi, when he subdivided section 1189 of the Hundred of Port Adelaide. The area just south of this, between Grand Junction and Torrens Roads, had been laid out by Osmond Gilles in 1847 and was known as "Yatala" (sections 422 and 2072, Hundred of Yatala). The area west of Levi's subdivision was farmland owned by William Henry Gray and was called Graytown (section 699, Hundred of Port Adelaide). After Gray's death, Graytown was subdivided and sold as residential lands in 1898. Many of the streets there are named after Gray and his family; Rosetta, Edith, Alice and Jane (now Jennifer Street) were all family members.

The generally accepted explanation of the name "Rosewater" is attributed to Philip Levi who, it is claimed, said "The locality was a swamp, and the perfumes arising from the stagnant water were so offensive that I thought the name of Rosewater would, to some extent, act as a corrective". An alternative etymology came to light in 1945 when a Commissioner of Police report accompanying a parcel of human bone fragments discovered in Rosewater stated the following:

"Mrs J. Ward, the owner of the property, where the bones were found, states that her father arrived here 100 years ago and took up land and used water from a well on the site in question, for the manufacture of sand bricks. The water in the well was so pure that it was named "rose water" and her father often remarked to her that the district derived its name therefrom".

As the population grew the area became crowded with subdivisions. The areas north and east of Levi's original "Rosewater" were called Rosewater North and Rosewater East respectively, while to the east of Evans Street were Dockville and Kingsnorth. East of these were the subdivisions of Brookesville, Ottoway and Ottoway East, which are now all part of Ottoway. East of Addison Road were Rosewater Gardens, Rosewater Gardens South and Stone's Farm (where the Flinders Hotel now stands), now part of Pennington. East and south of the "Yatala" division were Kelmscott, Everton and Pennington, the latter two being part of the modern suburb of Pennington.

Rosewater Post Office opened around July 1877, the same year as the District Council of Rosewater was established out of parts of Yatala North, Yatala South and Queenstown and Alberton council areas. The post office closed in 1982. The council was abolished in 1899 by annexation to the Corporate Town of Port Adelaide. Rosewater East Post Office on Grand Junction Road opened on 1 December 1947. The official Post Office closed in 2020 and was re-licensed as an agency within a local business a few doors east.

It was not until 1945 that the proliferation of separately-named subdivisions was put to an end when the Port Adelaide Council moved to reduce the number of postal areas, combining 13 subdivisions into what is now the suburb of Rosewater. These subdivisions were: Bayswater, Dockville, Graytown, Kelmscott, Kingsnorth, Kingston, Kingston East, Paddington, Perth, Rosatala, Rosewater East, Yatala and the original district of Rosewater itself.

Between the 1880s and the 1980s, Rosewater grew to become a reasonably large township with two hotels, a police station, a fire station, churches and many shops along Grand Junction Road. The Rosewater Gasworks was the largest local industry and many of the residents of the area worked in the timber mills, rail yards and woolsheds to the east of Port Adelaide.

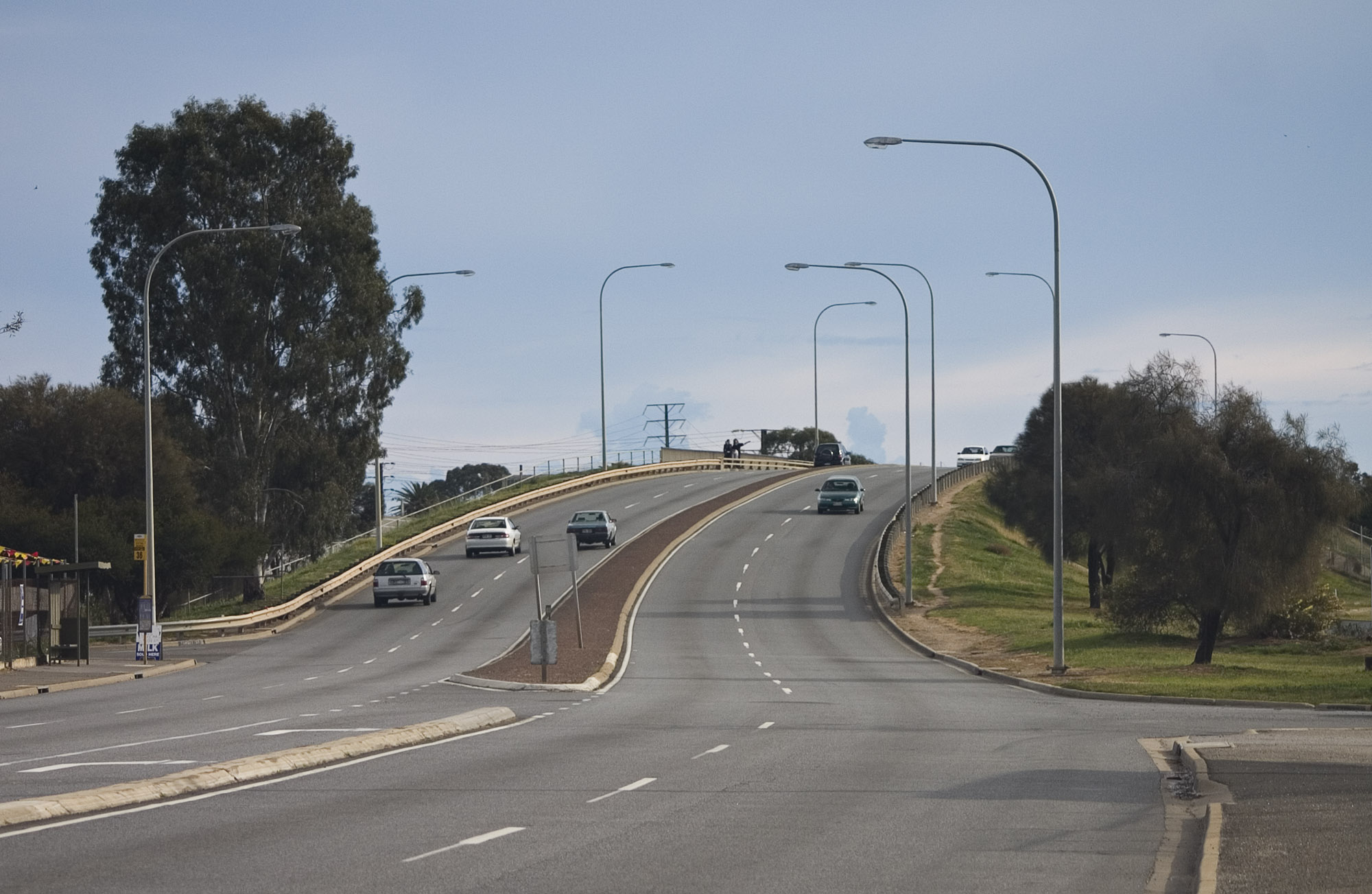
The Redhill Bridge which goes over the Outer Harbor railway line

Rosewater was also the site of the AdelaideRadio (VIA) maritime radio station system, the sixth built in Australia and one of 19 around the country. Opened 1 October 1912 it operated from 8am to midnight every day of the week, and was one of the first points of contact for ships sailing south from Hong Kong and Japan. Apart from its major function of listening for ships' messages, Adelaide also handled traffic to and from the State telegraph system, and broadcast time signals to shipping. By 1963 the rapid industrialisation of the Rosewater area had increased electrical interference to the point where a move to a new site became necessary and the operation was moved to McLaren Vale where it operated until 1993 when it was shut down.

In the 1980s the extension and widening of Grand Junction Road and the construction of the Redhill Bridge (over the Outer Harbor railway line) spelt the end for many of the small shops in the area and property value experienced a slump. Since the start of the 21st century, with the new development in and around Port Adelaide, the area is experiencing a revival of property values. Rosewater was served by Rosewater railway station from 1916 until 1988. The railway remained open for freight trains until they were diverted to operate via the Mary MacKillop Bridge in 2008. A new rail spur line is being established in 2023 to operate on the original freight train lines, coming off the Outer Harbour line, and terminating at a new, to-be-built station alongside the South Australia Rail Museum that is housed in the former rail freight depot.

== Geography ==
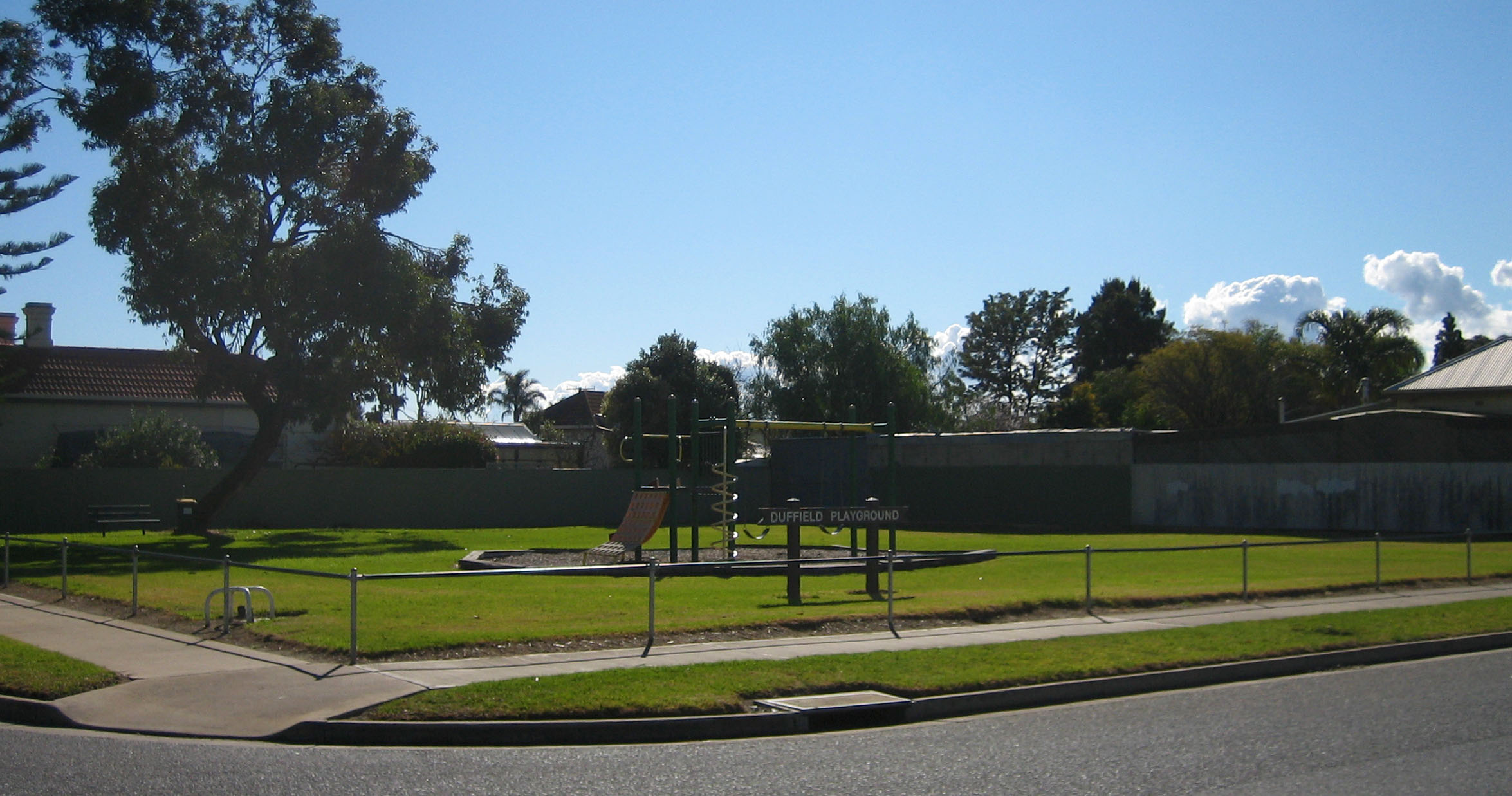
A small recreational area in Rosewater called "Duffield Playground"

Prior to European settlement the Rosewater area was mainly swampy marshlands of stagnant water. Today the area is almost entirely urbanised with only a small swamp area left next to the Redhill Bridge. The Eric Sutton Oval is one of two reserves in the area, with the other, Duffield Playground, a short distance away.

== Residents ==
As of the 2021 Census, the population of Rosewater is 3,582. This number is split almost evenly between males and females, with only 7 more women than men. Of the local population, 68.2% were born in Australia, and 3.7% self-identified as Aboriginals and/or Torres Strait Islanders. The median age in Rosewater is 39 years, and the median weekly household income is $1314.

Common religious affiliations (in descending order) were: Catholics at 18.5% of the total population, Buddhism (4.7%), Anglican (3.5%).

== Industry ==
In April 1975, Clyde Engineering opened a locomotive manufacturing plant in Rosewater, transferring production from Sydney. It closed in April 1986.

== Places of interest ==
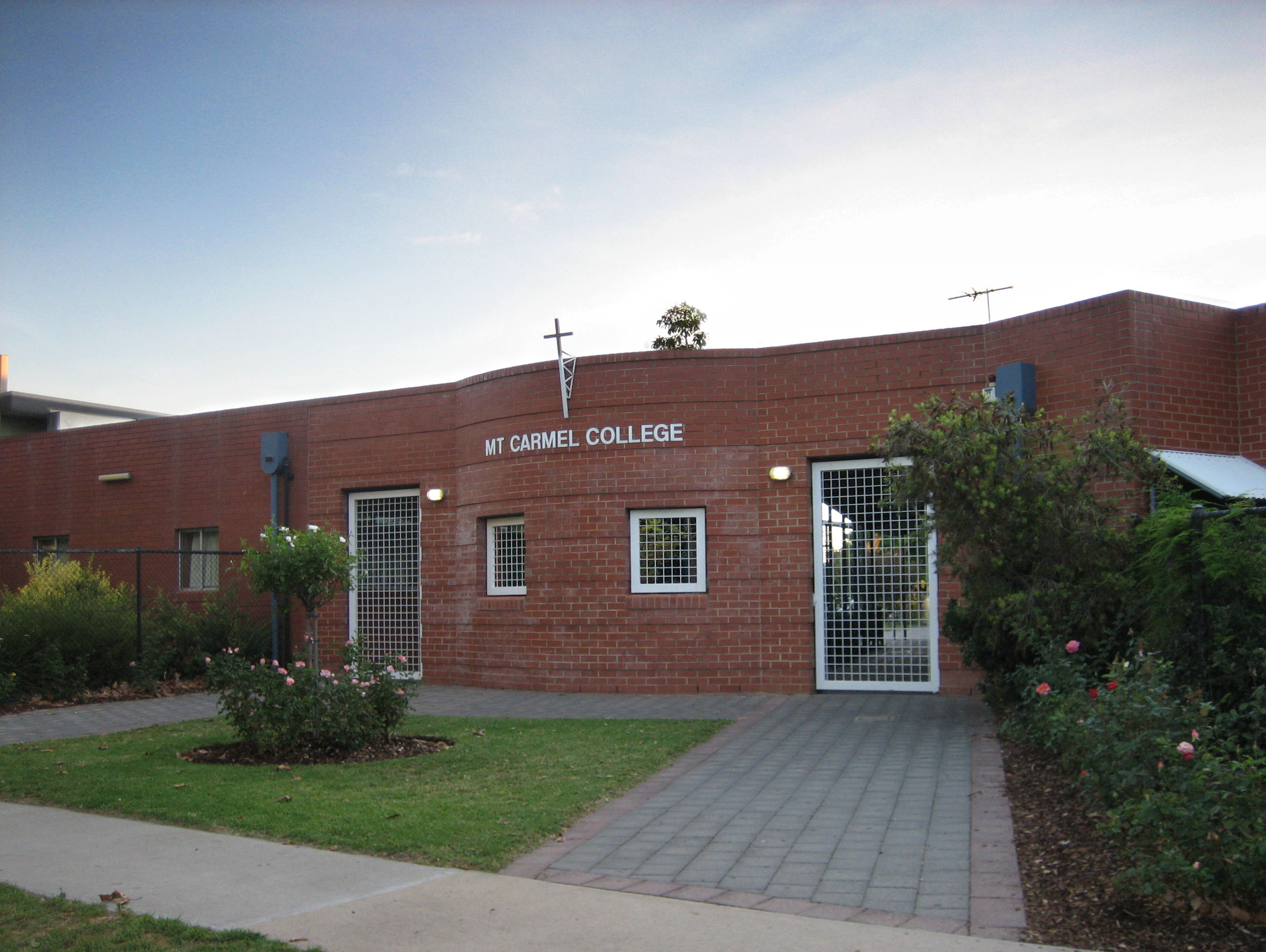
Mount Carmel College in Rosewater

- Rosewater Bowling Club
- Rosewater Football Club
- Eric Sutton Oval
- Duffield Playground
- Mount Carmel College
- Rosewater Hotel
- Rosewater Uniting Church

== See also ==
- City of Port Adelaide Enfield
