= District Council of Birkenhead =

District Council of Birkenhead South Australia
- Coordinates: 34.8365°S 138.5°E
- Established: 1877
- Abolished: 1886
- Council seat: Birkenhead
LGAs around District Council of Birkenhead:
		Yatala North; Port Adelaide
	District Council of Birkenhead	Yatala; Yatala South/Enfield; Port Adelaide
Semaphore; Glanville	Port Adelaide	Yatala; Yatala South/Enfield; Port Adelaide

The District Council of Birkenhead was a local government area in South Australia centred on the suburb of Birkenhead. It was gazetted on 22 February 1877 from areas formerly part of the District Council of Lefevre's Peninsula. The council chambers were based out of the Birkenhead Hotel. It absorbed the remainder of the Lefevre's Peninsula council, which had been severely reduced in size by the creation of the Corporate Town of Semaphore, on 7 August 1884. It ceased to exist when it merged with the Corporate Town of Port Adelaide on 7 December 1886 as the Birkenhead Ward, a move supported by the council and the local population.

== Chairmen ==
- G. Playfair (1877–1878)
- T. Cruickshank (1879–1883)
- J. K. Charleston (1884–1886)
