= Port District Football Club =

Port District

Names
- Full name: Port District Football Club
- Former name(s): LeFevre Peninsula F.C. (1873–1898); Semaphore Central F.C. (1898–1978)
- Nickname: Ditters

Club details
- Founded: 1873; 153 years ago
- Colours: Black White
- Competition: Adelaide Footy League
- President: Darren Hawkins
- Coach: Josh Ramsey
- Captain: Louis Sharrad
- Premierships: (20): 1914, 1923, 1924, 1925, 1928, 1931, 1938, 1939, 1940, 1941, 1947, 1948, 1949, 1956, 1959, 1970, 1972, 1992, 2022, 2024, 2025
- Ground: Largs Reserve

Uniforms
Home	Away	Alternate

Other information
- Official website: pdfc.com.au

Port District Football Club is an Australian rules football club located in Largs Bay, South Australia. The club is the successor of Semaphore Central F.C., which merged with Exeter F.C. to form Port District in 1979.

The team played in different leagues of South Australia until they joined "South Australian Amateur Football League" (current Adelaide Footy League) when it was established in 1911.

== History ==
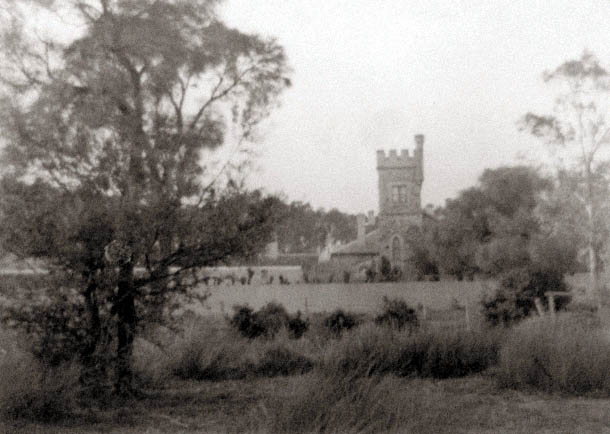
Glanville Hall Estate, where the club played their first games along with other teams

The club was originally established as "LeFevre Peninsula Football Club" and after several name changes, in 1898 it was renamed "Semaphore Central Football Club". During their first years of existence, LeFevre shared grounds with Port Adelaide.

In 1876, the club had to look for a new ground and several members of the team suffered bruises and sprains when an accident occurred with the coach that carried them back to home.

Accident – While the Lefevre's Peninsula Football Club was returning from Coromandel Valley on Saturday evening an accident occurred. There were about 20 members in a large coach, and on going down a steep hill the vehicle; which had not sufficient brakepower, pressed closely on the horses, the result being that one of the swingletree's was unhooked. The horses then became unmanageable, and pulling the driver off his seat and started at full speed down the hill. The occupants at once jumped out on to the road, and all of them sustained severe bruises and sprains, one of them being rendered unconscious until he reached home. The coach was brought to a standstill by one of the leaders tripping up, and the rest falling over him. The horse had to be shot yesterday.

— The Register, 21 July 1876

With the former Buck's Flat converted into a cemetery, sports clubs began to look for alternative grounds to play football and cricket. Representatives of football and cricket clubs met at Sayers Port Hotel and agreed to acquire the Oval belonging to the Queen & Albert Cricketing Association, currently the Alberton Oval. Port Adelaide was one of the clubs that moved to Alberton Oval, which was leased for 10 years.

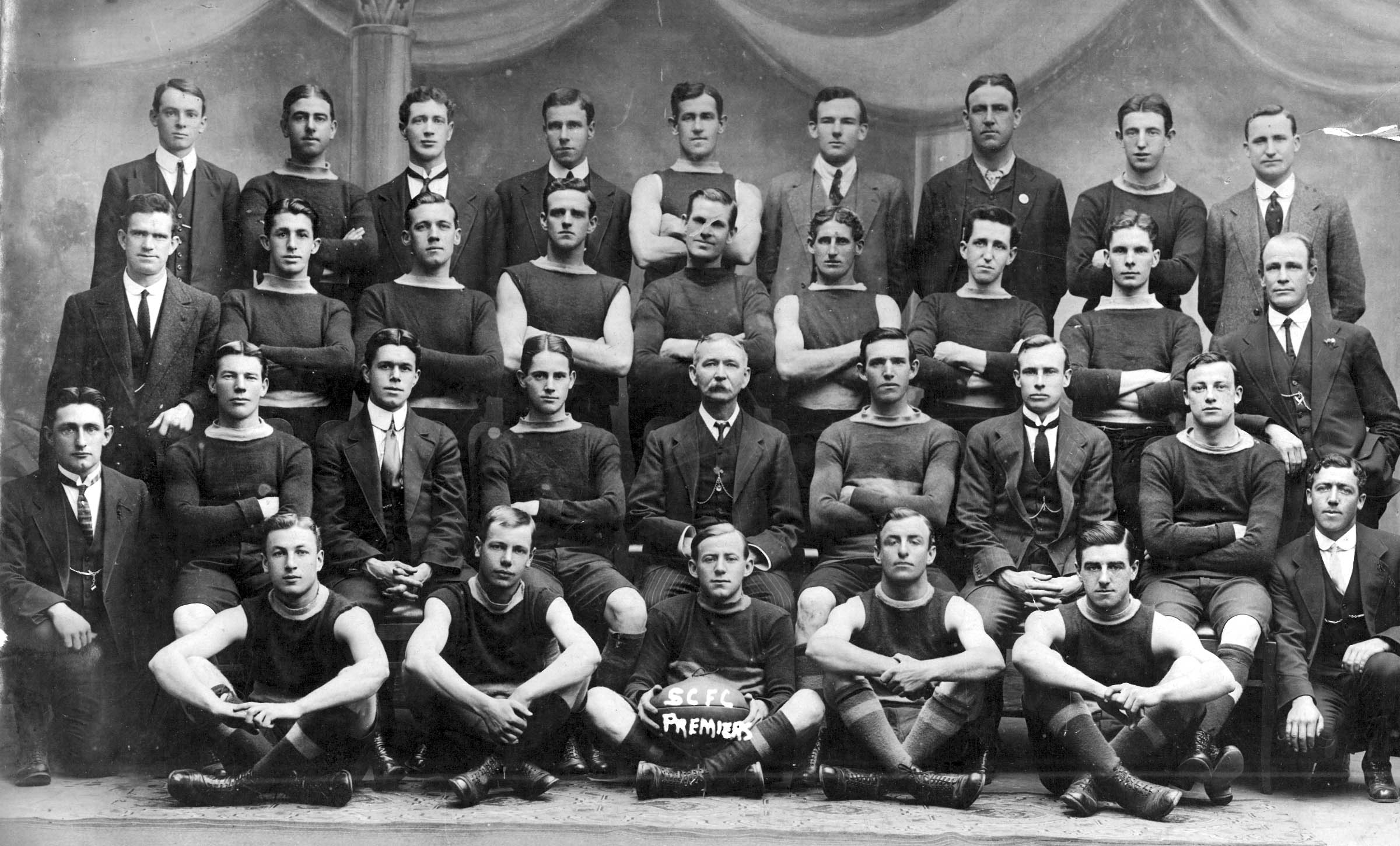
Semaphore Central F.C. won their Premiership in 1914

In 1881, Mr H. W Thompson was elected president of the club in a meeting at the Exeter Hotel. It was also decided that the colours should be blue and white. Alberton Oval would be a frequent venue for LeFevre Peninsula F.C. during those years. In March 1881, LeFevre played Port Adelaide for the first time. Some footballers that played that season were: T. Hopkins (Captain), R. Gill, E. Hosie, W. Walsh, R. Walsh, R. Raven, H. Grenville, W. Knapman and J. Renfrey. In 1885 the club joined the recently created South Australian Junior Football Association.

The amalgamation of the Lefevre Peninsula and Glanville councils to form the Semaphore Corporation in 1883, made the club change their name to "Semaphore Football Club". There are recordings of a team named "Semaphore Wanderers", which participated in some informal matches in 1895, and two years later the "Semaphore Junior" took part in the Port Adelaide Junior Football Association, playing the Grand Final v Australs which they lost by 3 points. In 1898, the Semaphore F.C. were playing in the Port Adelaide and Suburban Association. The team had adopted blue and red as their colors (blue guernsey with a horizontal red band). Most of the games were played in Bush Oval of Largs Bay.

In 1900, newspapers referred to the club as "Semaphore Central F.C." In 1906 the team embarked on a tour to the South East of South Australia, when they played several clubs of the region. That same year Semaphore won the minor Premiership after beating Norwood II. The team had lost only one single game for the entire season.

By 1908, Semaphore wore a grey jumper with a horizontal black band, which would remain as the main kit during the 1910s, then switching to black with a grey horizontal band. In 1910 a number of players from Semaphore Central were elevated to the senior Port Adelaide team including S. C. Stidston, P. O'Grady and J. Middleton. One year later, Semaphore joined recently formed "South Australian Amateur Football League". The team also developed a long-time rivalry with University F.C.

In 1914, Semaphore Central won their first Premiership in the SAAFL, after defeating Adelaide University in the Grand Final on the Norwood Oval.

The Advertiser wrote about the match:

Semaphore Central and University fought out the premiership of the Amateur League on Saturday on the Norwood Oval. A fair crowd witnessed the match, which resulted in a win for Semaphore after a strenuous game. In winning the premiership Semaphore have a fine record. They lost their first match of the season against University, but they went through the remaining seventeen contests without a loss. (...) Final scores: Semaphore 6 goals 12 behinds, Varsity, 4 goals 11 behinds. Best Players: Winners: Channon (Best on Ground) Stone, Peters, McEwen, Wilcox, Moore, Johnson, Quinn, Yeo. Losers: Pellew (best on side), Sard, Northey, Hayward, Blackett, Williams, Limb, Holmes and Cole. Goal kickers:-Semaphore: Channon (2), Green, Limb, Duthie, and forbes (1). Varsity: Limb, Blackett, Steele, and Northey (each 1).

Exeter FC kit (1924–79). The club merged to Semaphore Central in 1979.

Nevertheless, the euphoria of Semaphore's first title ended soon so more than half the team were called by the British Empire to fight at World War I. By war's end in 1918, six heroes from the club's premiership side were dead.

After that first flag in 1914, Semaphore Central won the Division 1 championship in 1923–1925 (achieving their first trichampionship) and 1928. During the 1930s the team won three titles, and five titles in the 1950s although Semaphore would not win any more championships until 1970. From then on, the team has won only two titles, the last in 1992.

Exeter Football Club won five premierships in its history, including three in a row from 1939-1941 and again in 1947 and 1948.

In 1979, Semaphore Central merged with Exeter Football Club to form "Port District Football Club". Port District set its date of foundation in 1873 as they consider themselves a continuity of Semaphore Central.

In 2014, Port District paid tribute to their fallen soldiers wearing a replica of the 1914 Semaphore jumper.

In 2022, Port District won their first division 1 premiership in 30 years when they defeated Prince Alfred OC by 18 points: 9.9 (63) to 7.3 (45) in the grand final held at Norwood Oval. they won again in 2024, defeating Glenunga by 20 points, also at Norwood Oval.

In 2025, Port District will play in their 24th Division 1 Grand Final at Norwood Oval against the winner of Golden Grove and Rostrever OC.

== Uniform evolution ==
c. 1892–98	1898–1905	1906–07	1908–11
1912–16, 1919, ?	1917, 1920–38	1939–?	1979–present

== Honours ==
Premierships won by Port District:

- SAAFL:
  - Div 1 (20): 1914, 1923, 1924, 1925, 1928, 1931, 1938, 1939, 1940, 1941, 1947, 1948, 1949, 1956, 1959, 1970, 1972, 1992, 2022, 2024
  - Div 1R (3): 1979, 1991, 1995
  - Div 2 (3): 1979, 1998, 2007
  - Div 3 (1): 1984
  - Div C Grade Premier (5): 1992, 1995, 2000, 2001, 2021
