= Town of Thebarton =

- Local government area
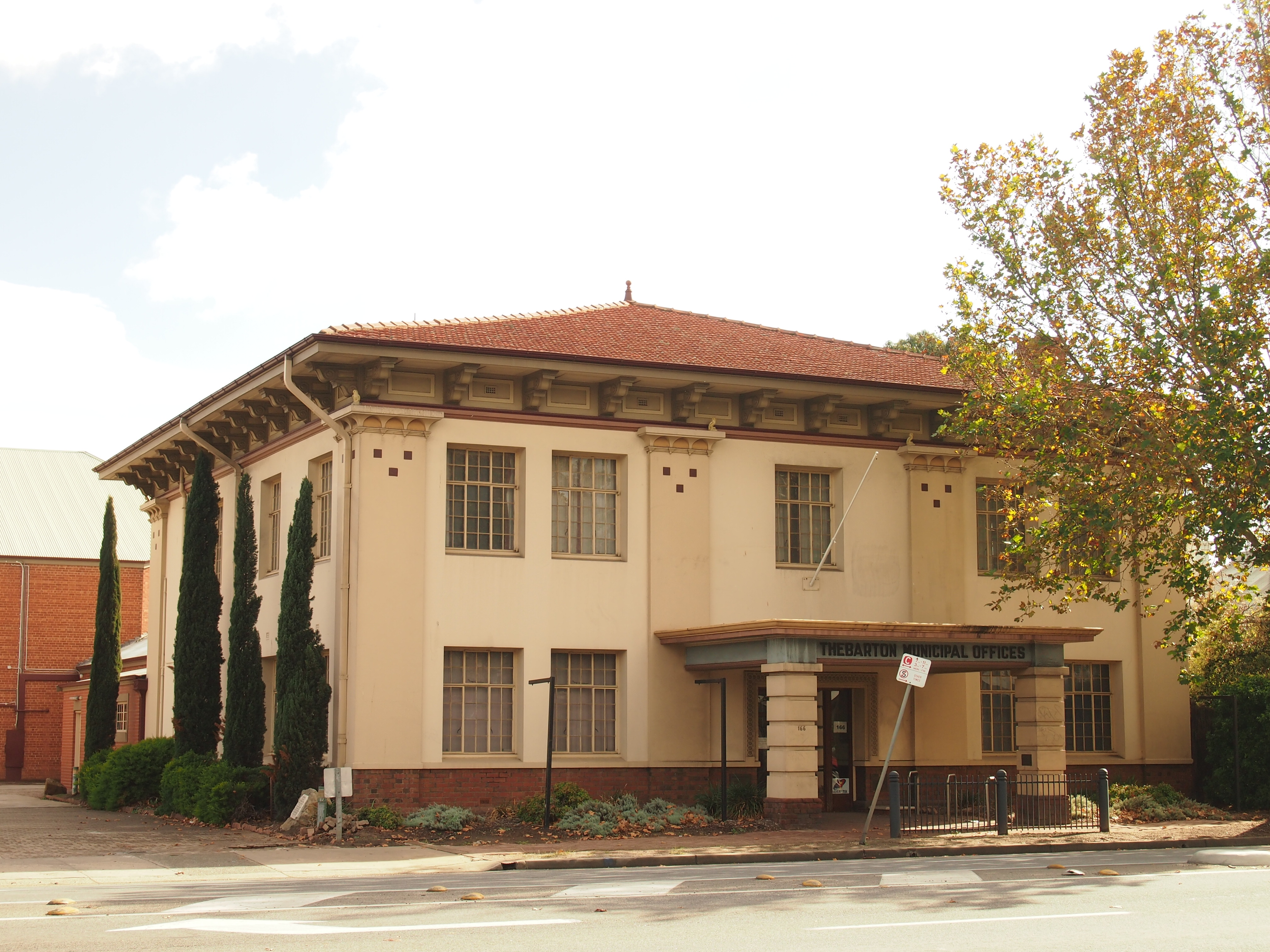
- Former Thebarton Municipal Offices, pictured in 2014

- Coordinates: 34.9153°S 138.5725°E
- Country: Australia
- State: South Australia
- Established: 1883
- Abolished: 1997

Government
  - State electorate: Peake (1970–1997) West Torrens (1956–1970, 1915–1938) Thebarton (1938–1956)
LGAs around Town of Thebarton
Woodville; Hindmarsh-Woodville	Hindmarsh; Hindmarsh-Woodville	Hindmarsh Hindmarsh-Woodville
West Torrens	Town of Thebarton	Adelaide
West Torrens	West Torrens	Adelaide

The Town of Thebarton was a local government area of South Australia from 1883 until 1997. It was seated at the village of Thebarton, now an inner west suburb of Adelaide.

== History ==
The township of Thebarton was split from the City of West Torrens and incorporated on 8 February 1883 as a municipality called the Corporation of Thebarton. The municipality was divided into four wards: Strangways, Musgrave, Torrens and Jervois. The inaugural mayor was proclaimed to be Benjamin Taylor and the councillors were proclaimed as Thomas Prichard, James Vardon, Edward Cunliffe Hemingway, William Pepper, James Bernard Broderick, Richard Wilson, Joseph Stevenson and James Manning.

At the time of incorporation, all of the modern suburb of Thebarton and most parts of the modern suburbs of Torrensville and Mile End defined the extent of the municipality of Thebarton. The town boundaries were formalised with the River Torrens and Adelaide parklands forming the northern and eastern borders. The town was bordered on the west by the modern Hardys Road, Rankine Road and Bagot Avenue, and the southern boundary was between one and two city blocks north of the modern Sir Donald Bradman Drive, running from Bagot Avenue to the parklands.

In March 1997, the municipality of Thebarton was amalgamated with the City of West Torrens to form the City of West Torrens Thebarton. Mere months later the name of the new body reverted to West Torrens.

== Neighbouring local government ==
The following adjacent local government bodies co-existed with the Thebarton town council:

- District Council of Woodville lay northwest until 1993 when it amalgamated with the Town of Hindmarsh to form the City of Hindmarsh Woodville.
- Town of Hindmarsh lay north and northeast until 1993 when it amalgamated with the City of Woodville.
- City of Adelaide western parklands lay east and southeast.
- District Council of West Torrens lay immediately south, southwest and west. From 1944 it was called the Town of West Torrens and, from 1950, the City of West Torrens.
