= District Council of Lefevre's Peninsula =

District Council of Lefevre's Peninsula South Australia
- Coordinates: 34°50′25″S 138°29′25″E
- Established: 1872
- Abolished: 1884
- Council seat: Exeter
LGAs around District Council of Lefevre's Peninsula:
	District Council of Lefevre's Peninsula	Yatala South
Glanville; Semaphore	Port Adelaide; Birkenhead	Yatala South; Rosewater

The District Council of Lefevre's Peninsula was a local government area in South Australia centred on the Lefevre Peninsula from 1872 to 1884.

== History ==
The council was gazetted in 1872. The council chambers were located in the Exeter Hotel at Exeter. The District Council of Birkenhead separated from it on 22 February 1877, and much of the remaining section, along with much of the adjacent District Council of Glanville, seceded as the new Corporate Town of Semaphore on 20 December 1883. In January 1884, the Semaphore council debated whether the Lefevre Peninsula council had become defunct as a result of the secessions, and it formally ceased to exist when it merged into the Birkenhead council on 7 August 1884.

== Chairmen ==
- J. N. Wills (1872)
- H. Cowie (1876–1877)
- G. Shorney (1877–1878)
- J. C. Lovely (1881–1882)
- A. P. Hall (1883)
