= City of Port Adelaide =

- Local government area
- Coordinates: 34°50′46″S 138°30′11″E
- Country: Australia
- State: South Australia
- Established: 1853
- Abolished: 1996
- Council seat: Port Adelaide

Area (1935)
  - Total: 37.4 km^{2} (14.4 sq mi)

Population
  - Total: 29,136 (1935)
  - Density: 779.0/km^{2} (2,017.7/sq mi)
LGAs around City of Port Adelaide
Lefevre's Peninsula (1872–1877); Semaphore (1884–1900)	Lefevre's Peninsula (1872–1877); Birkenhead (1877–1886)	Yatala North (1868–1933); Salisbury (1933–1996)
Semaphore (1884–1900)	City of Port Adelaide	District Council of Yatala (1853–1868); Yatala South/Enfield (1868–1996); Rosewater (1877–1899)
Glanville (1864–1888)	Portland Estate (1864–1888); Woodville (1875–1993); Hindmarsh Woodville (1993–1996)	Queenstown and Alberton (1864–1898); Woodville (1875–1993); Hindmarsh Woodville (1993–1996)

The City of Port Adelaide was a local government area of South Australia centred at the port of Adelaide from 1855 to 1996.

== Early years ==
The council was established on 27 December 1855 when the Corporate Town of Port Adelaide was proclaimed as a new municipality centred on the township of the port of Adelaide, which had been opened some years prior in 1837. From 1884 to 1900 the adjacent district councils of Portland Estate, Birkenhead, Queenstown and Alberton, and Rosewater, and the Corporate Town of Semaphore, were amalgamated with the Town of Port Adelaide, dramatically increasing its size. On 23 May 1901, Port Adelaide was proclaimed a city by Governor Tennyson and became the City of Port Adelaide.

From the late 1830s to 1945, the area surrounding Port Adelaide was subdivided into many small district areas as owners bought, subdivided and sold areas of land. As the areas became smaller, and more landowners named their own estates, the number of these early "suburbs" reached 90.

Modern Name	Early Subdivision Name
Alberton	Albert Town, Glebe
Birkenhead	Bridgetown, Bridgewater, Davies Town, Sandwell
Ethelton	Ethelston, Thornton
Exeter	Bath, Clifton, Davies Town, Fisherville, Freshwater, Greenwich, Staplehurst
Gillman	Newhaven, North Arm, Northarmton
Glanville	Port Bridge, Waterville
Largs Bay	Eastbourne, Ferryville, Guilford, Harveyton, Hastings, Newport, Shoreham, Ward Town, Margate
Largs North	London, Swansea, Largs Bay Estate
Osborne	Brooklyn, Mascotte, Midlunga, Blackpool, Austral-Brindisi Estate
Ottoway	Guildford Park, Hardwicke, Norbiton, Sassafras Estate, Whiteville
Outer Harbor	Eurimbla, Harbour Park, Portsmouth
Peterhead	Farnham, Gold Diggers Village, Hamley, Sandwell
Port Adelaide	Greytown, Moilong, Newhaven, Portland Estate, Portsea
Rosewater	Bayswater, Paddington, Dockville, Perth, Yatala, Rosatala, Kingsnorth, Greytown, Kingston, Kingston East, Kelmscott, Rosewater East
Semaphore	Alderley, Clairville, Clifton, Freshwater, Kew, New Liverpool, Plymouth, Scarborough, Weymouth
Semaphore South	Davington, Saint Margaret's, Thornton, Whitby
Taperoo	Draper, Gedville Estate, Koolena, Kooraka, River View, Silicate, Silicate Beach
Wingfield	Brooklyn, Dundas, Hull, Millicent, Myrtlehome, Newark, Norahville, Rosslyn, Wicklow

== 1940s to 1996 ==
By the 1940s the number of suburbs was becoming a problem, so the Port Adelaide Council moved to reduce the number of local district areas to 18, in 1945. The boundaries and names of the suburbs were further stabilised when postcodes were introduced to Australia in 1967.

In March 1996 the City of Port Adelaide merged with the City of Enfield to form the new City of Port Adelaide Enfield.

== Mayors of Port Adelaide ==
(Corporate Town of Port Adelaide)

- Captain French; first mayor of Port Adelaide
- J. W. Smith "for five or six years"
- F. Reynolds 1864
- J. M. Sinclair 1866–1869
- John Formby 1869–1871
- J. M. Sinclair 1873–1876
- David Bower 1877–1878
- Theodore Hack 1879–1880
- Henry W. Thompson 1881–1882
- George Bollen 1883
- Thomas John King 1884
- Theodore Hack 1885
- Sidney Malin 1886
- J. Cleaver 1889
- Charles Tucker 1891
- Bernard Sigrist 1894
- C. R. Morris 1895
- T. Grose 1899

(Greater Port Adelaide formed from union with Semaphore)

- J. W. Caire 1900
- J. C. G. Jurs 1901
- R. S. Guthrie 1902
- J. W. Caire 1904
- John Sweeney 1905
- A. W. Brown 1908
- W. T. Rofe 1910
- E. Branford 1912
- J. H. Clouston 1912
- John Sweeney 1916
- R. H. Smith 1918
- Lewis 1920
- J. Anderson 1920
- H. Slade 1922
- A. O. R. Tapp 1925
- F. J. Brown 1927
- A. J. W. Lewis 1930
- J. Gibb 1933
- Harry William Bray (1934–1937)
- Ralph Wright (1937–1940)
- Alfred Lowrie Good (1940–1943)
- William Henry Gilbert (1943–1946)
- George McBeth MacKay (1946–1949)
- Harold Joseph Moore (1949–1955)
- Percy William Whicker (1956–1964)
- Anna Moir Rennie (1964–1969)
- Harold Charles Roy Marten (1969–1987)
- Ronald Bruse Hoskin (1987–1989)
- Julie Barbara Dearing (1989–1991)
- Robert Arthur Allen (1991–1995)
- Johannes Gerardus Pieters (1995–1996)
