= Rosewater Uniting Church =

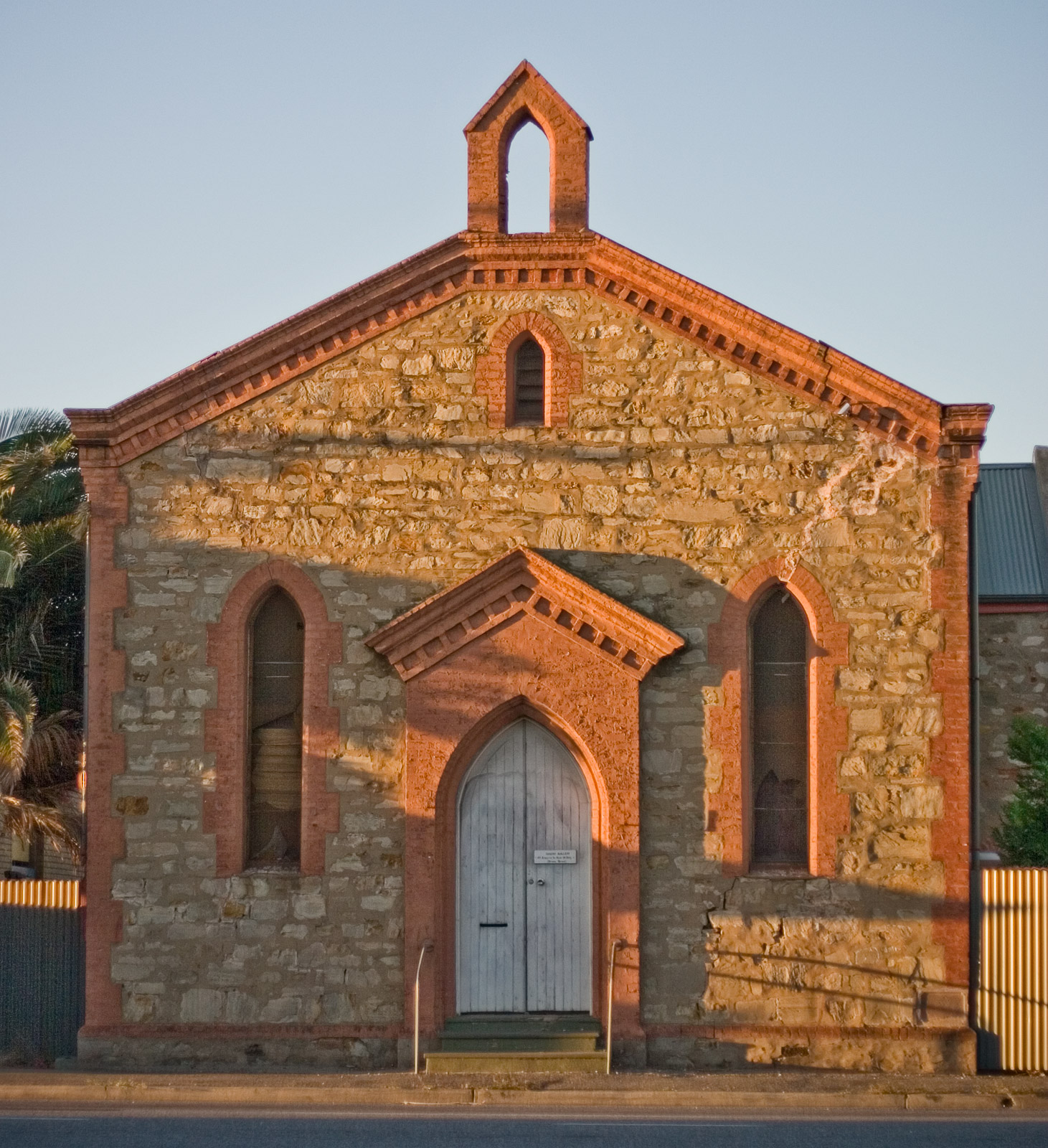
- Main entrance of the church, 2007
- Rosewater Uniting Church
- 34°51′06″S 138°31′08″E
- Address: 63 Grand Junction Road, Rosewater, South Australia
- Country: Australia
- Denomination: Uniting (since 1977)
- Previous denomination: Primitive Methodist (1878 – 1900); Methodist (1900 – 1977)

History
- Founded: 10 August 1878
- Founder: H. C. E. Muecke
- Dedicated: 24 November 1878

Architecture
- Closed: before 1994

The Rosewater Uniting Church was a Uniting church located in Rosewater, South Australia.

The former Methodist church was founded as a Primitive Methodist church in 1878. The foundation stone was laid by the Chairman of the District Council of Rosewater, H. C. E. Muecke on 10 August, and the opening services were held on 24 November 1878.

== History ==
The first Primitive Methodist Church in the area was built at Rosewater and opened on 4 April 1858. The congregation grew steadily and a larger building was needed by 1877. This was called the "Whittaker Memorial" after the first superintendent of the Adelaide Circuit. This is the Port Road building now used by the Churches of Christ, having been sold to them in 1900.

Primitive Methodism had a large following in the area and in October 1877 tenders were called to build a church in Port Adelaide on the corner of Church and Cannon Streets. This church was opened on 27 January 1878.

Rosewater was a developing suburb at this time, so a church site was purchased in 1878 and building commenced in August that year. At the laying of the foundation stone, Muecke, chairman of the Council, expressed delight that a place of worship and a Sabbath School was to be established.

Under the supervision of the architect, Mr. Campbell, the builder, Walter Russell had the church ready for opening on 24 November 1878. Large crowds attended the opening services. The preacher at the morning and afternoon services was the Rev, J. Goodwin, and the local pastor, Rev. S. Raymond preached in the evening. Next evening was a public tea meeting. As this was the first church in the area it was well supported. The Sunday School was formed the following Sunday, 1 December, with 60 scholars and 10 teachers.

=== Extensions ===
The original building, said to have seated 150 persons, proved to be inadequate and in 1884 the church was enlarged by the addition of a transept, with a school room underneath. Construction started on 22 February 1884, when the foundation stone was laid by Mr. J. Bickers Esq., J.P. and was completed that year.

The Sunday School Hall was built in 1920, the foundation stone being laid on 10 April by Mr. Richard Sutton who was superintendent of the Sunday School for over 30 years. The kitchen and adjoining room were added several years later.

=== Renovations ===
When Wesleyan Methodists, Primitive Methodists, and Bible Christians united in 1900, Rosewater Church became a congregation of the Methodist Church of Australasia, at first being part of the Port Adelaide Circuit, and later a member of the separate Alberton Circuit.

At the time of the 50th Jubilee in 1928 the church was renovated and redecorated at the cost of over $500. Re-opening and re-dedication services were attended by many past members. Twelve stained glass windows, contributed as memorials of departed church workers, were unveiled.

On 22 June 1977 Rosewater Church became a part of the Uniting Church in Australia. The building was sold about 1994.
