= District Council of Hindmarsh =

- Local government area
- Coordinates: 34.9070°S 138.5699°E
- Country: Australia
- State: South Australia
- Established: 1853
- Abolished: 1875
- Council seat: Hindmarsh

Population
  - Total: 3,500 (1853)
LGAs around District Council of Hindmarsh
Glanville	Queenstown and Alberton	Yatala; Yatala South
	District Council of Hindmarsh	Yatala; Prospect; Yatala South
	West Torrens	Adelaide

The District Council of Hindmarsh was a local government area in South Australia from 1853 to 1875, seated at the inner north west Adelaide suburb of Hindmarsh.

At the time of its establishment the population was approximately 3,500.

== History ==
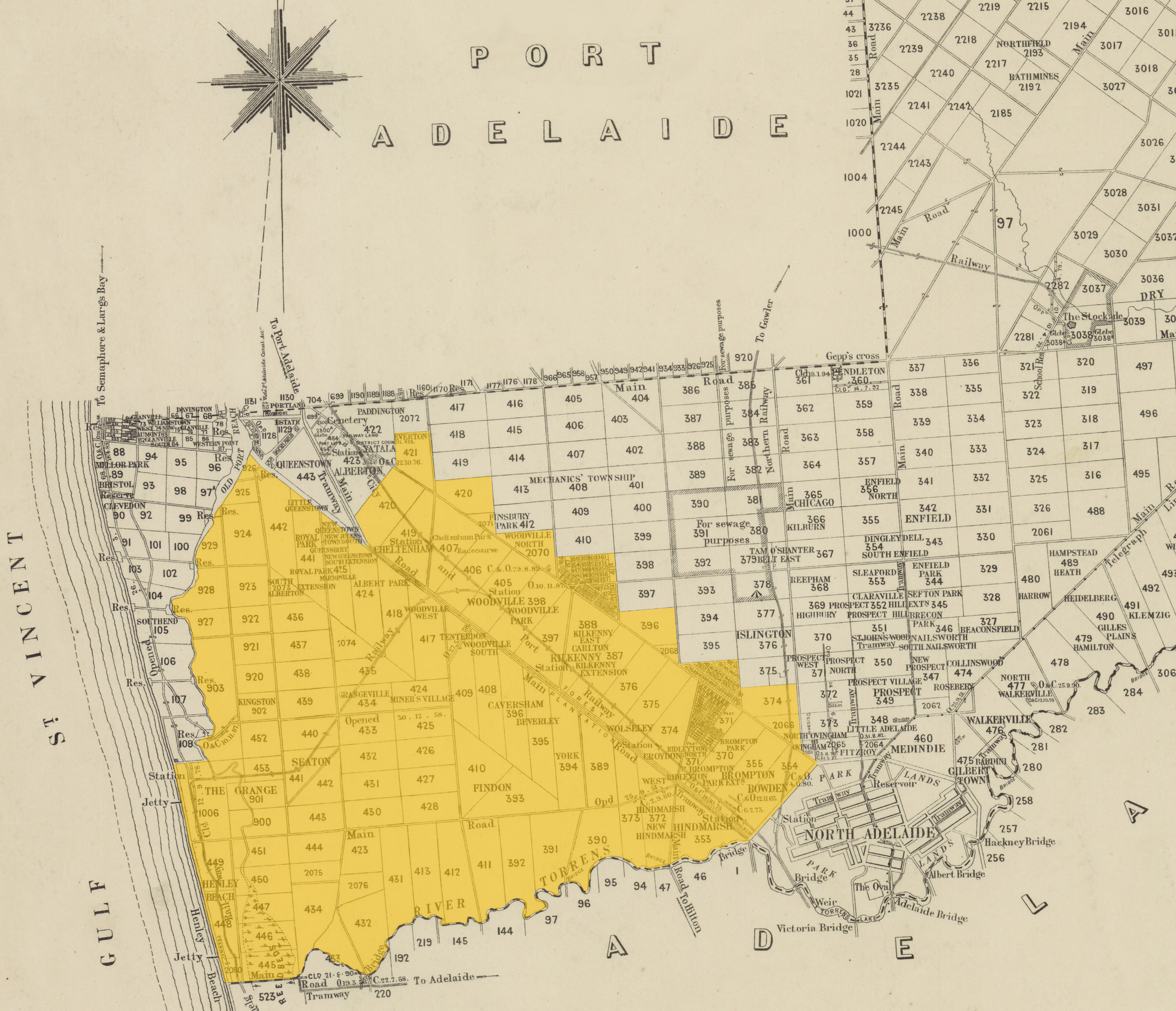
Map showing the boundaries of the council in 1853 with relation to the south west of the Hundred of Yatala

The council was proclaimed on 2 June 1853 on the same day as East Torrens and Onkaparinga councils. Local government had only been introduced in South Australia in 1852, and only the City of Adelaide (1852) and District Council of Mitcham (12 May 1853) had been created earlier.

The council was named, like its seat, after South Australia's first governor, John Hindmarsh, who was the first owner and subdivider of section 353, Hundred of Yatala, the triangle of land having contiguous boundaries with both the historic and present suburb of Hindmarsh, south of Port Road. The inaugural councillors were Thomas Magarey, James Gibson, John Ready, John Packham, and Robert R. Torrens.

In 1874 the Corporate Town of Hindmarsh seceded from the district council, leading to the effective end of the latter in the same form. The remainder of Hindmarsh district council moved its seat to Woodville and was renamed to be the District Council of Woodville in 1875.

== Neighbouring local government ==
The following adjacent local government bodies co-existed with the Hindmarsh council:

- District Council of Glanville lay north west from its establishment in 1860.
- District Council of Queenstown and Alberton lay immediately north from its establishment in 1864.
- District Council of Yatala lay north east and east until it was split in two in 1868, after which time the District Council of Yatala South was Hindmarsh council's northern and north eastern neighbour.
- District Council of Prospect lay immediately east from its establishment in 1872.
- City of Adelaide northern parklands lay south east.
- District Council of West Torrens lay immediately south, across the River Torrens, from its establishment a month after Hindmarsh council.
