= Alberton, South Australia =

Alberton
- Suburb
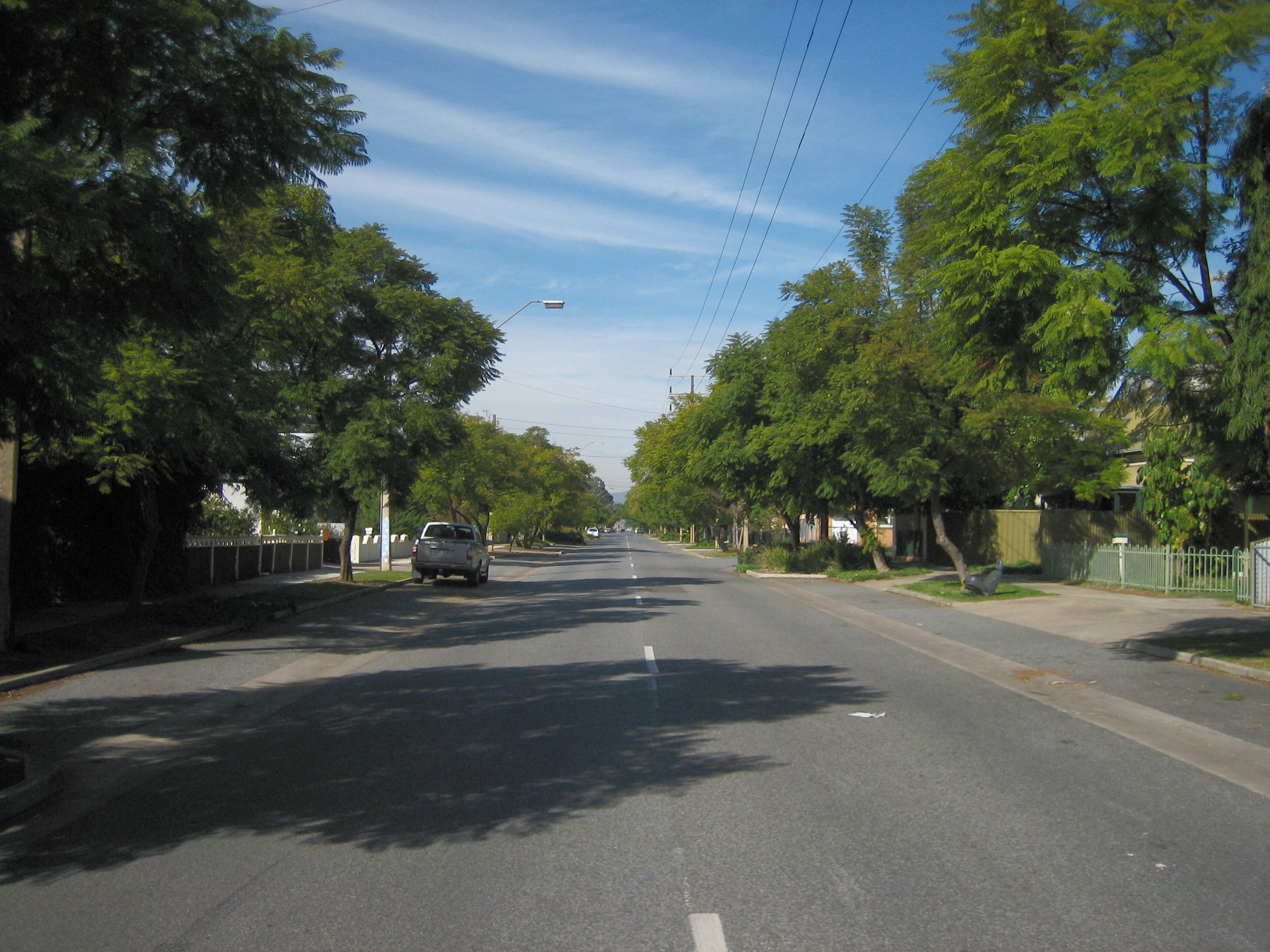
- Torrens Road, Alberton

- Coordinates: 34°51′39″S 138°30′54″E
- Country: Australia
- State: South Australia
- City: Adelaide
- LGA: City of Port Adelaide Enfield
- Location: 12 km (7.5 mi) from Adelaide city centre; 2 km (1.2 mi) from Port Adelaide
- Established: 1839

Government
  - State electorate: Cheltenham
  - Federal division: Hindmarsh

Area
  - Total: 0.9 km^{2} (0.35 sq mi)

Population
  - Total: 1,860 (SAL 2021)
- Time zone: UTC+9:30 (ACST)
  - Summer (DST): UTC+10:30 (ACST)
- Postcode: 5014
- County: Adelaide
Suburbs around Alberton
Port Adelaide	Port Adelaide	Port Adelaide
Port Adelaide; Queenstown	Alberton	Rosewater
Queenstown	Cheltenham	Rosewater

Alberton is a metropolitan suburb in the west of Adelaide, South Australia, about 20 minutes drive from the city. Part of the City of Port Adelaide Enfield, it is bordered by the suburbs of Rosewater, Queenstown, Cheltenham and Port Adelaide.

== History ==
Alberton, like Port Adelaide, is rich in historical significance. On 7 March 1839, the South Australian Company was granted private subdivision of preliminary section 423. Section 423 was sold as 'The Town of Albert' and subsequently became 'Albert Town' after Prince Albert, Prince Consort of Queen Victoria. Eventually, 'Alberton' became commonly used and around the turn of the century was officially adopted as the suburb's name.

With demand for workers at the Port and homes for these workers needed, late in 1840 there were already 61 houses and 235 residents in Alberton. The layout of 'Albert Town' originally had provisions for four public squares, two of which still exist. St Georges' Square became the site for the Anglican Church while St Andrew's Square was later subdivided and became the site of the Trinity Uniting Church. St Patrick's Square and Company Square are today still used as public recreation areas.

Many of the streets in Alberton took the names of the original purchasers while others, such as 'Prince', 'Queen' and 'King' Streets reflect their English heritage.

Alberton Post Office opened on 1 January 1855.

The District Council of Queenstown and Alberton was established in 1864, bringing dedicated local government to the residents of the two townships either side of the new Port Road. In 1898 this council was absorbed by the Corporate Town of Port Adelaide.

== Sport ==
Alberton is home to Australian rules football club Port Adelaide, who participate in the national Australian Football League (AFL) and the Adelaide-based South Australian National Football League (SANFL). The Alberton Lawn Bowls Club was opened in 1903 at the Alberton Oval as the second oldest lawn bowls club in Adelaide. It leased part of the Alberton Oval from the Port Adelaide Council until 1997 when it became an underlessee of the Port Adelaide Football Club.

== Landmarks ==
=== Alberton Oval ===
Alberton Oval is located on Queen Street. The ground is used for Australian rules football and cricket and has a capacity of 15,000 people with seated grandstands holding 2,000.

Alberton Oval is the training and administration base for the Port Adelaide Football Club.

=== Alberton Hotel ===
First licensed in 1848, the Alberton Hotel is one of the oldest hotels in South Australia. For the past 60 years, it has been owned and operated by the Brien family. The old bluestone structure still stands at the same spot on the corner of Port Road and Sussex Street.

=== Former Alberton Cemetery ===
Located on Parker Street, the former Alberton Cemetery was opened in 1847 and officially closed in 1874, with the last burial being conducted in 1922. Parker Street is a very short street which runs off Port Road, between the old Alberton Baptist and Alberton Uniting Churches (neither now used as churches).

On 17 November 1847, the governor of South Australia granted 4 acres of land to St Paul's Church of England church for burials, although the land was used for burials before that date. The cemetery was closed on 15 January 1874, with the last official burial being conducted in 1922. The land was transferred to the City of Port Adelaide in 1938 and developed as a public park in 1994, called Pioneer Park.

Although the cemetery is no longer used for burials, some gravestones are still evident. Details of the approximately 3,000 people interred are available from the Anglican Diocesan of Adelaide Archives.

== Transport ==
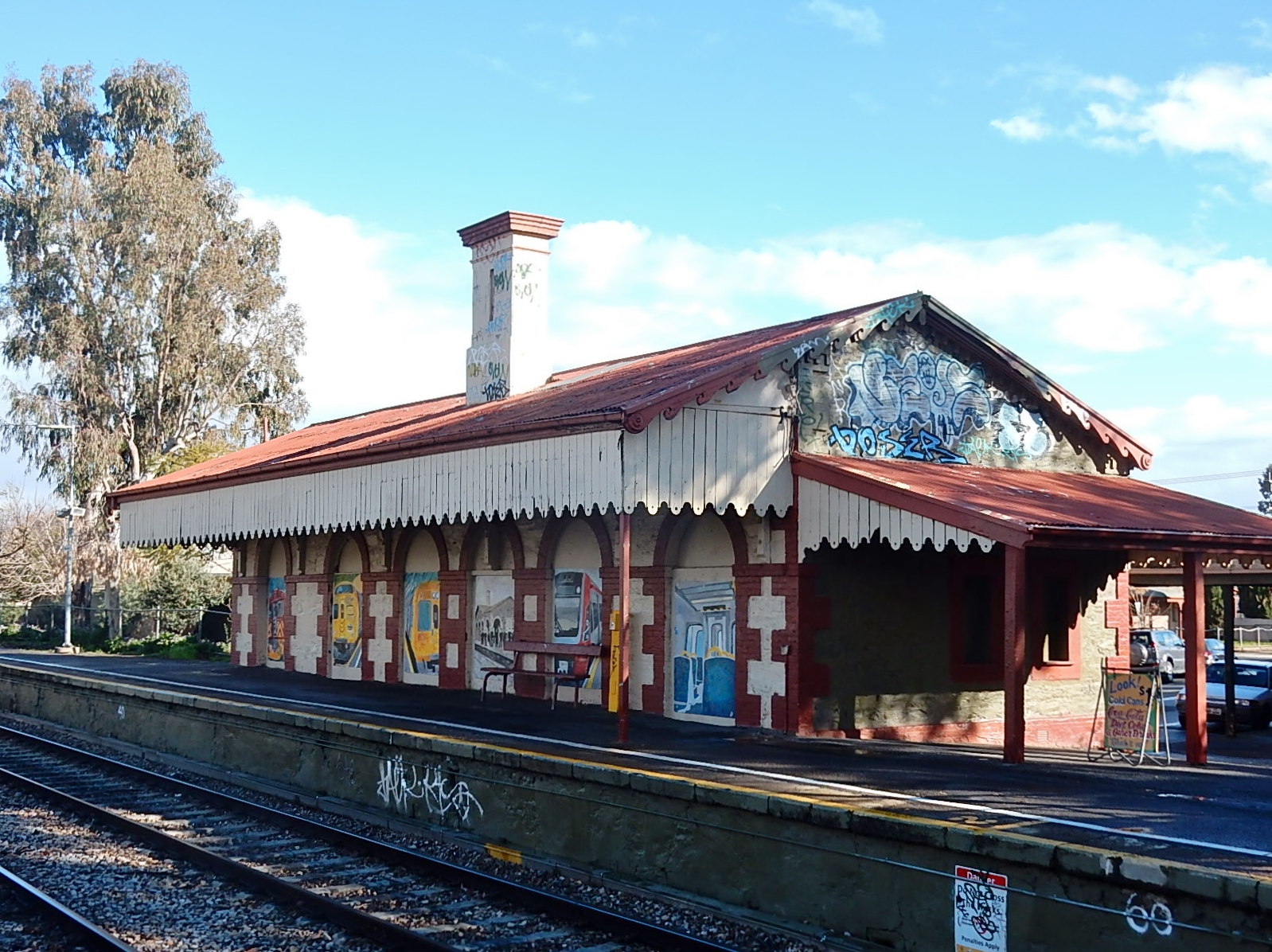
Graffiti on the heritage-listed 1856 Alberton railway station building in 2016.

Alberton railway station was one of the first local stations to open in South Australia, and is Australia's oldest surviving station building at an operational railway station. The railway from Adelaide to Port Adelaide was constructed in 1856 and was the first line to be built in South Australia. Alberton was one of the original stops, the others being Woodville and Bowden.

The stone and brick building on the Port Adelaide-bound platform is the original station building dating from 1856. This building, the western station platform, and the footbridge are state heritage-listed.

Alberton station is serviced by the Outer Harbor and Port Dock lines. While the ticket office is no longer in use, the station building underwent major restoration and renovation works in 2026, in celebration of the station's 170th birthday.

== Governance ==
The District Council of Queenstown and Alberton, established in 1864, was the first local government body in Alberton. From 1898, following the district council's annexation by the then-Town of Port Adelaide, Alberton was a prominent township at the south eastern end of the Town, which was proclaimed as a city in 1901. The City of Port Adelaide merged with the City of Enfield in 1996 to become the City of Port Adelaide Enfield, which now provides local government to Alberton, as part of its Port Adelaide Ward.

Alberton lies in the state electoral district of Cheltenham (formerly Price) and within the safe Labor federal seat of Hindmarsh. Alberton, like much of the greater Port Adelaide area, has always been strong Labor Party territory. Both state and federal government representation of Alberton has been dominated by members of the Labor Party.
