= Corporate Town of Semaphore =

Town of Semaphore South Australia
- Coordinates: 34.8387°S 138.4813°E
- Established: 1884
- Abolished: 1900
LGAs around Town of Semaphore:
Birkenhead; Port Adelaide	Birkenhead; Port Adelaide
Town of Semaphore	Portland Estate; Port Adelaide
Glanville; Woodville	Queenstown and Alberton; Port Adelaide

The corporate town of Semaphore was a local government area in South Australia. It was created on 20 December 1883, and re-gazetted on 17 January 1884, from areas which had been part of the District Council of Lefevre's Peninsula and District Council of Glanville. The separation of Semaphore would make both its former municipalities unviable, with Lefevre's Peninsula subsequently merging into the District Council of Birkenhead and Glanville with the District Council of Woodville. In 1889, the municipality acquired the Semaphore Institute building for use as the Semaphore Town Hall; the building survives today as the heritage-listed Semaphore Library.

Wards of Semaphore included Clairville, Exeter, Glanville, Largs and Scarborough, several being recognisable as the names of present-day suburbs Largs Bay, Glanville and Exeter.

It amalgamated with the corporate town of Port Adelaide on 11 November 1900.

== Mayors ==
- Theodore Hack 1883–1885
- J. Neill (1886); first elected mayor
- J. C. Lovely (1887)
- Frederick Wallage Kennedy 1889–1891
- Philip Sansom 1891–1894
- Thomas Todd (1894–1896)
- William E. Deslandes 1896–1898
- Richard Bray 1898–1900
- Elijah Branford (1900)

After the amalgamation, Branford held the unique position of "Mayor of Nowhere".
