= Hugo Carl Emil Muecke =

Australian businessman and politician (1842 – 1929)

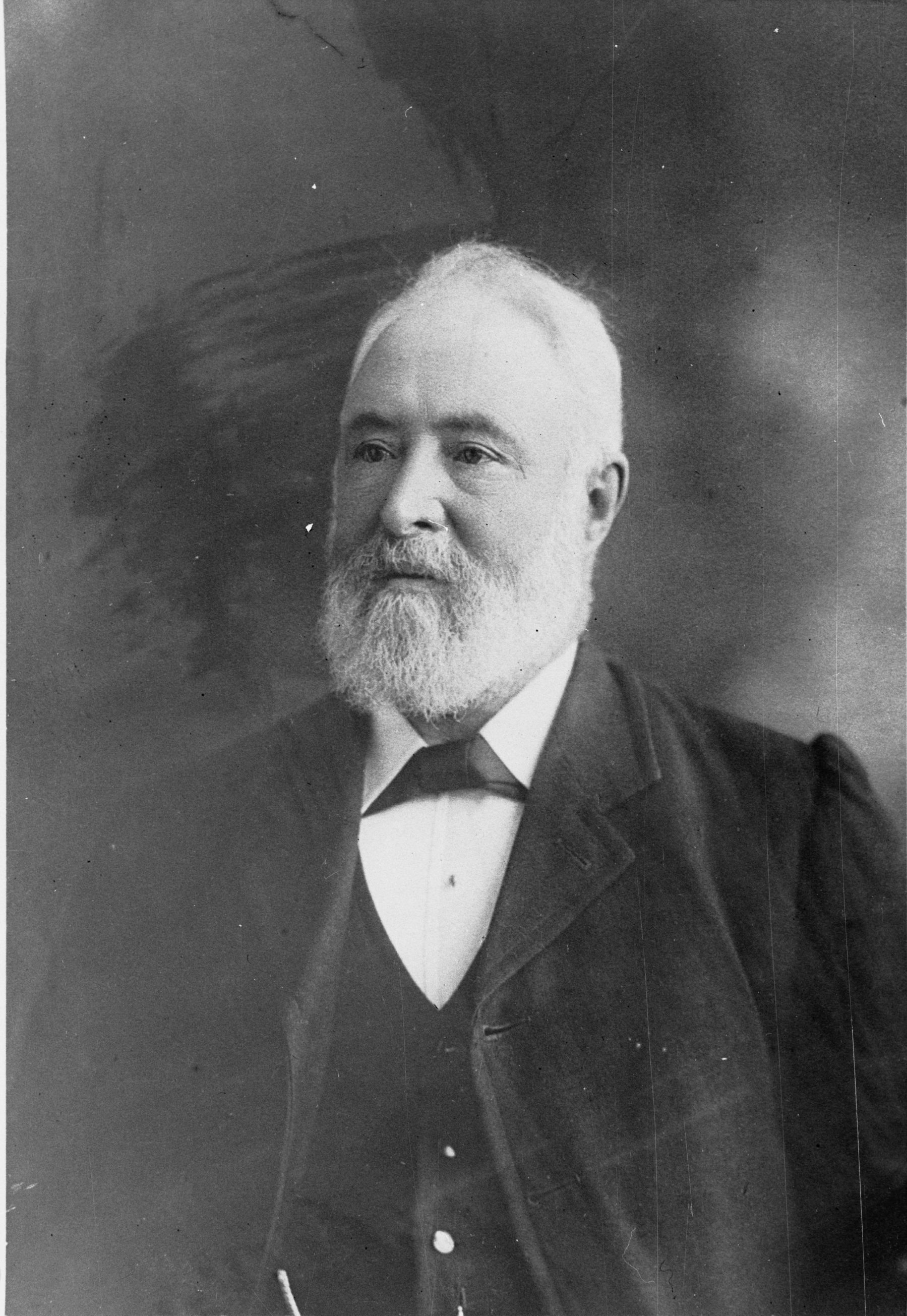
Hugo Carl Emil Muecke

Hugo Carl Emil Muecke (8 July 1842 – 6 June 1929) was a businessman and politician in the colony and State of South Australia.

== History ==
Muecke was born the eldest child of Dr. Carl Muecke (16 July 1815 – ) at Rathenow, near Berlin, and was brought to South Australia by his parents when only seven years of age. They settled at Tanunda, among many other German settlers, where his father became a Lutheran minister, and was later editor of Australische Zeitung, South Australia's major German-language newspaper, but returned to Germany in 1869. Young Hugo went to the local school, and at the age of 16 joined the merchants and shipping agents John Newman & Company of Port Adelaide, who were looking for a young man fluent in both English and German. He soon displayed a high degree of business acumen, and at the age of 24 was made a partner, and on the death of John Newman in 1873, Muecke took over the business, and as H. Muecke and Co. it continued to prosper.

He maintained good relations with Adelaide's German community and was appointed vice-consul for Germany in 1877. Five years later he was made Imperial German Consul, retaining that position for 32 years. He was appointed to the Adelaide Jubilee International Exhibition organizing committee as Executive Commissioner for Germany, responsible for liaising with German exhibitors and guests.

He was elected to the Legislative Council for the Central District in 1903, holding that seat for seven years. He was also a prominent member of the Adelaide Chamber of Commerce, and served a term as chairman. He was at different times chairman of the Rosewater and the Walkerville District Councils, and a member of the Port Adelaide Council.

He took an early interest in the Broken Hill mines, and was made a member of the board of directors of Broken Hill Proprietary in 1892, and in 1914 succeeded John Darling as chairman of directors. He was also at different times on the boards of the Adelaide Steamship Company, the Trustee and Agency Company, the Bank of Adelaide, and the National Life Assurance Company. He was a prominent Freemason and before the war was an active member of the German Club and the Adelaide Club.

He died after a long illness and was buried at the North-road Cemetery.

== Family ==
Muecke married Margaret Le Page (died 1 November 1918) originally from Guernsey, Channel Islands on 2 April 1863. They had homes at "The Myrtles", Hawkers Road Medindie, then Fitzroy Terrace, Prospect. Their children were:

- Edwin Charles Muecke (3 March 1864 – 12 April 1941) married Lillie "Lizzie" Laughton on 29 May 1888

- Guelda Lillian Muecke (1889– ) married Noel Meyrick Hack in 1910. He was a son of tenor Charles Hack and grandson of John Barton Hack.

- Emilie Caroline Muecke (1866 – 17 July 1928)
- Alfred Eugen Muecke (13 September 1868 – 15 January 1886) was drowned with son of W. R. Cave while holidaying at Chowilla, the station of William Robertson.
- Dora Muecke (8 December 1870 – 1956) society charity organiser
- Louis Hugo Muecke (7 February 1873 – c. 25 July 1943) married Isabel May Sunter (1860–1947), daughter of Canon Sunter, on 4 April 1899
- Walter Le Page Muecke (16 June 1875 – 15 March 1894) died at Roseworthy after fall from hay waggon
- Andrew Percy Muecke (23 September 1877 – 1955) married Ethel Eunice Braund (1883–1964) on 10 April 1907. In 1884 he was one of four founding students, along with Mamie Brown, Mabel Dodswell and Cassie Thomas, at a school begun by Miss Margaret and Miss Kate Brown, around the kitchen table in their parents' home on Mann Terrace, North Adelaide. The School soon grew too big and moved in 1885 to North East Road (later called Northcote Terrace), Medindie and became known as The Medindie School and Kindergarten. In 1893 the School moved to its present site and became known as Wilderness School in 1918. It later became an all-girls school.
- Dr. Francis Frederick Muecke (6 December 1879 – 14 April 1945), a noted surgeon, married Ada Crossley on 11 April 1905
- Mina Florence Muecke (14 December 1881 – 1957) married Fergus Voss Smith (died 22 September 1946) on 9 July 1909
- Violet Margaret Muecke (18 April 1889 – 1969) married Edward Warner Benham (1872–1948) on 21 June 1924

== See also ==
- Rosewater Uniting Church
