= District Council of Yatala North =

District Council of Yatala North South Australia
- Coordinates: 34°46′S 138°38′E
- Established: 1868
- Abolished: 1933
LGAs around District Council of Yatala North:
| Munno Para West | Munno Para West | Munno Para East |
| Birkenhead; Port Adelaide; Rosewater | District Council of Yatala North | Highercombe; Tea Tree Gully |
| Birkenhead; Port Adelaide; Rosewater | Yatala South/Enfield | Tea Tree Gully |

The District Council of Yatala North was a local government area of South Australia on the central Adelaide Plains from 1868 to 1933. It was split from the abolished District Council of Yatala on 18 June 1868. The council area ranged approximately from Dry Creek in the south to the Little Para River in the north.

== History ==
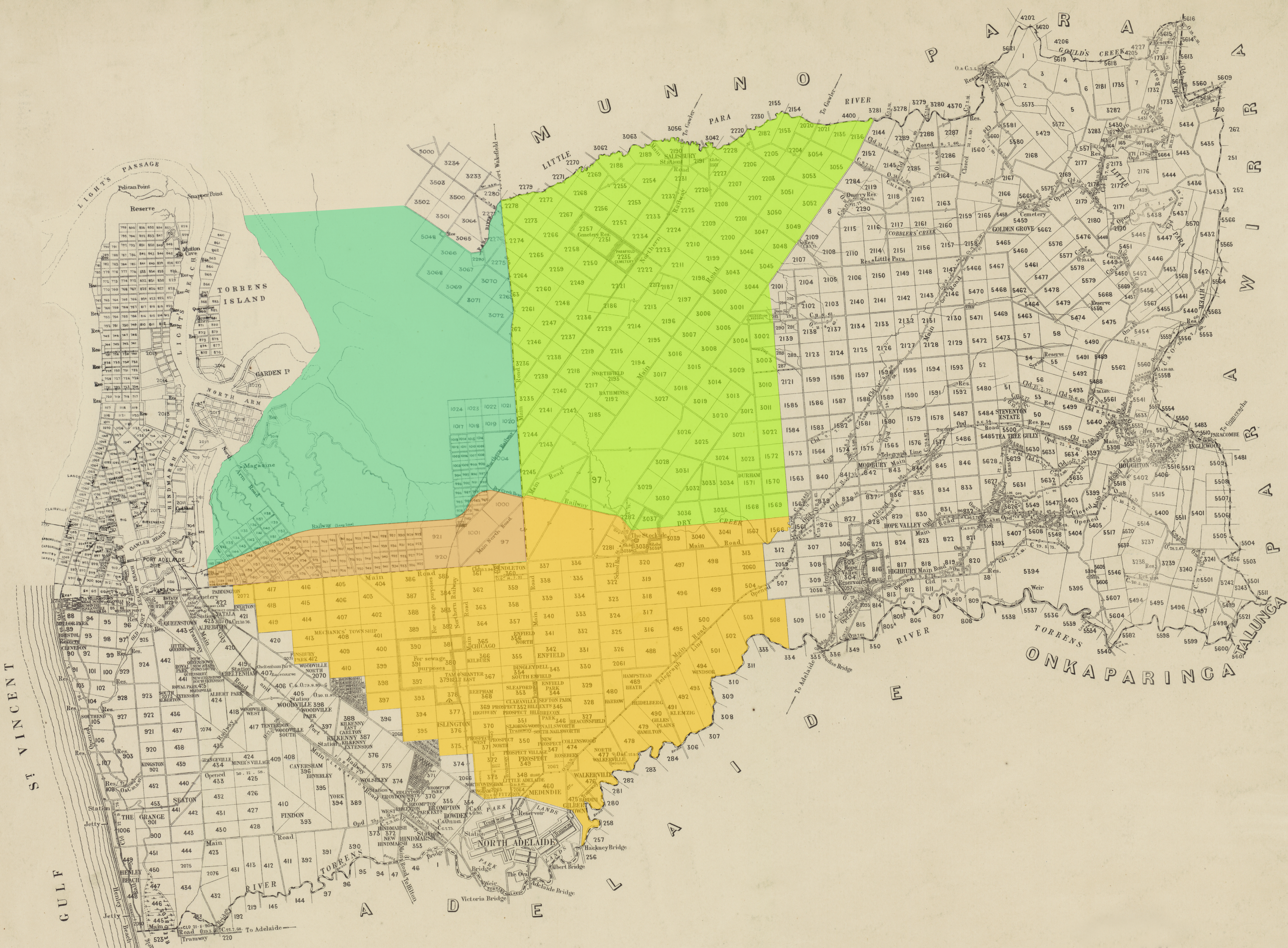
Map showing the boundaries of Yatala North and Yatala South immediately after the 1868 split, with relation to the Hundred of Yatala (shaded in green and yellow) and the Hundred of Port Adelaide (shaded in cyan and orange)

The council was established in 1868 when the District Council of Yatala was divided at the Dry Creek and the Dry Creek-Port Adelaide railway line into the District Councils of Yatala South and Yatala North.

On 22 June 1933, following a proposal by Local Government Areas Commission the Yatala North District Council was abolished and merged with a large portion of the adjacent to the north District Council of Munno Para West (which was abolished at the same time), to form the new District Council of Salisbury, which ultimately became the modern City of Salisbury.

== See also ==
- Hundred of Yatala
