= District Council of Highercombe =

District Council of Highercombe South Australia
- Coordinates: 34.8211°S 138.7316°E
- Established: 1853
- Abolished: 1935
- Council seat: Hope Valley
LGAs around District Council of Highercombe:
Yatala; Yatala North	Munno Para East	Para Wirra
Yatala; Yatala North	District Council of Highercombe	Para Wirra
Yatala; Yatala South	Payneham; Walkerville; Tea Tree Gully	Para Wirra; Payneham

The District Council of Highercombe was a local government area in South Australia from 1853 to 1935.

It was proclaimed on 14 July 1853 in the eastern portion of the Hundred of Yatala, and was the original council in the area. It was bordered on the west by the eastern boundary of the District Council of Yatala and on the south by the River Torrens. The five initial councillors appointed by the Governor were Joseph Ind, of Little Paradise, Robert Milne of Dry Creek, George McEwin from the Glen Ewin Estate, John Gollop from Highercombe (now Paracombe) and Henry Klapper from Hope Valley. The new council variously met at five local hotels before building its own council chamber in Haines Road, Teatree Gully in 1855. It was the first purpose-built district council chambers in South Australia; the building survives today and is listed on the South Australian Heritage Register.

By 1858, disputes had arisen about the effectiveness of the original boundaries, in particular between residents of the north and south of the district. A petition campaigning for the south to secede argued that "the interest of the north and south portions being in no way identical", there was "an apparent impossibility of amicable working of the district...as at present constituted". It was not a unanimous view, being met with a counter-petition stating that its signatories were "astonished" by the separation proposals, arguing that the district was working satisfactorily and that separate councils would be unnecessarily expensive. Those arguing for separation won the debate, and on 8 October 1858, the District Council of Teatree Gully, consisting of the northern portion of the Highercombe council, was declared as a separate council, while the southern portion of Highercombe council remained under that name.

In 1906, the council was described as including the towns of Hope Valley, Highbury, Houghton and part of Inglewood. The original council chambers had fallen inside the Tea Tree Gully council boundaries, so the Highercombe council returned to holding meetings at local hotels, alternating between the Highbury Hotel, the Bremer Hotel at Hope Valley and the Travellers' Rest at Houghton, the latter two being hotels it had used in 1883–1885 prior to the building of the original chambers. It subsequently settled in the Hope Valley Institute when that building was opened in 1921.

The abolishment of the council was promulgated on 21 March 1935, following a Local Government Commission report that advocated cutting the number of municipalities in South Australia from 196 to 142, merging into the District Council of Tea Tree Gully and re-establishing the original council boundaries under the Tea Tree Gully name. Highercombe had been named in that process as one of 53 councils in the state with an annual revenue of less than £2,000, and so had been considered to be unviable as a separate municipality. The council ceased to exist on 1 May 1935.

== Chairmen ==
- Robert Milne (1853)
- J. Gollop (1874)
- H. Pitman (1886)
- W. H. Ind (1890)
- Charles Hill (1903–1907)
- N. Packer (1907–1909)
- J. W. Newman (1909)
- T. H. Possingham (1911)
