= G. S. Wright =

George Speller Wright (11 January 1845 – 1 January 1935), generally referred to as G. S. Wright, was an Australian banker, the first Inspector-General of the State Bank of South Australia. His middle name is very commonly misspelled as "Spiller".

== History ==
Wright was born in Abbot's Place, North Adelaide, the son of John Speller Wright (1812 – 8 February 1846) and his wife Martha Wright, née Darby (18 September 1810 – 6 August 1876), who arrived in South Australia in August 1839 aboard Somersetshire from London. Martha's brothers Thomas and John, John Darby's wife Mary and her sister Ann, and Ann's husband Joseph Peck were also on board.

Wright's father, a tailor in Hindley Street, died when he was barely 12 months old. No information has come to light as to the upbringing of Wright and his sister Amelia Ann, around four years his senior. There was no notice in the newspapers of their mother's death in 1876. He received some education at J. L. Young's Adelaide Educational Institution, but was not among the list of prize-winners, and was not mentioned in connection with school reunions. He began his business life with the auctioneers Townsend, Botting & Kay, followed by a brief stint with solicitors Belt, Cullen & Wigley, which he left for a position in the office of the Register. From there he joined the office of solicitors Hicks, Daly & Price.

In 1863 he was appointed clerk in the General Post Office (at the time a South Australian public service position), and when a vacancy opened for a clerk in the Under-secretary's office, he was the successful applicant. In 1866 Wright became clerk in the Crown Lands office and two years later promoted to clerk in the Chief Secretary's office. In 1860 he was appointed chief clerk in the Treasury department, and in 1873 promoted to accountant and receiver of revenue. In 1874 he became secretary to the Marine Board, and three years later returned to the Chief Secretary's office as chief clerk (both positions previously held by a member of the De Mole family), then Acting Under-Secretary 1879–1882, and served as Superintendent of Census in 1881. In 1882 he was appointed secretary to the Commissioner of Crown Lands, serving in that position for 14 years. During that time he received favorable attention in Parliament for his proposal for a wheat map. When the State Bank was inaugurated in 1896, Wright was selected as Inspector-General, in which position he served for 24 years before retiring in December 1920.

== Other interests ==
Wright was elected Mayor of Henley and Grange for the years 1916–17 and 1917–18.

He was a lifelong member of the Congregational Church, starting with the old Independent Chapel in Freeman street (later part of Gawler Place). He was a member of the Manthorpe Memorial Church at Unley from 1897 to 1908, then with the Henley Beach Congregational Church, serving as deacon and from 1911 as treasurer. He served as delegate to the executive of the Congregational Union.

== Family ==
Wright married Emma Elwin Olifent (21 April 1846 – 1932), a daughter of James S. Olifent, on 22 May 1867. They had three sons, all of whom studied at the Adelaide School of Mines, and four daughters:

- Arthur John Speller Wright (24 May 1869 – 17 July 1942), engineer with the Mines Department of Western Australia
- Ethel Minnie Wright (23 September 1870 – 28 December 1954) married Albert Edward Kinnear on 2 August 1894, lived at 13 Barr Smith Street, Tusmore.
- Annie Elwin Wright (10 June 1872 – 1962) married Henry Lloyd Snaith Nicol (c. 1871 – 10 March 1947) on 14 May 1943. He died suddenly.
- Harley Beaumont Wright (30 August 1873 – ) married Grace Maud Parkes on 26 March 1902. He was a mining and metallurgical chemist, for a time in the Sudan
- Edith Rosalie Wright (1875 – 1971) married Walter Campbell Dobbie (1876–1947), nephew of A. W. Dobbie, in 1903, lived at Burnside
- Eva Martha Wright (11 December 1877 – 27 September 1952) married Harold Gay Fitch (1877–1964) on 17 May 1906, lived at Henley Beach. He was son of John Thomas Fitch and founder of Fitch's Rubber Store in the Adelaide Arcade.
- George Lytton Wright (23 October 1879 – 10 March 1906), was metallurgist at the South Australian Government cyanide works at Arltunga, died from influenza.

They had a home at The Esplanade, Henley Beach, later at Howard terrace, Knightsbridge, where he died after a long illness and was buried privately at the West Terrace Cemetery.

Wright had a sister Amelia Ann Wright (c. 1841 – 3 August 1931), who married Samuel Summers (c. 1830 – 11 June 1906) on 29 May 1858. Samuel was the youngest son of Rev. Samuel Summers of Bristol.
