= District Council of Yatala =

- Local government area
- Coordinates: 34°50′S 138°37′E
- Country: Australia
- State: South Australia
- Established: 1853
- Abolished: 1868

Government
  - State electorate: Yatala (1857-1868)
LGAs around District Council of Yatala
Munno Para West	Munno Para West	Munno Para East
Port Adelaide; Portland Estate; Queenstown and Alberton	District Council of Yatala	Highercombe; Tea Tree Gully
Hindmarsh; Woodville; Hindmarsh (municipality)	Adelaide	East Torrens; Payneham; Stepney

The District Council of Yatala was a local government area of South Australia established in 1853 and abolished in 1868.

The council was named after the Hundred of Yatala which was proclaimed in 1846 in the County of Adelaide, Yatala likely deriving from a Kaurna word 'yartala' referring to the flooded state of the plain either side of Dry Creek after heavy rain. The name was used to describe a large portion of the Adelaide Plains from Port Adelaide in the west to Tea Tree Gully in the east.

== History ==
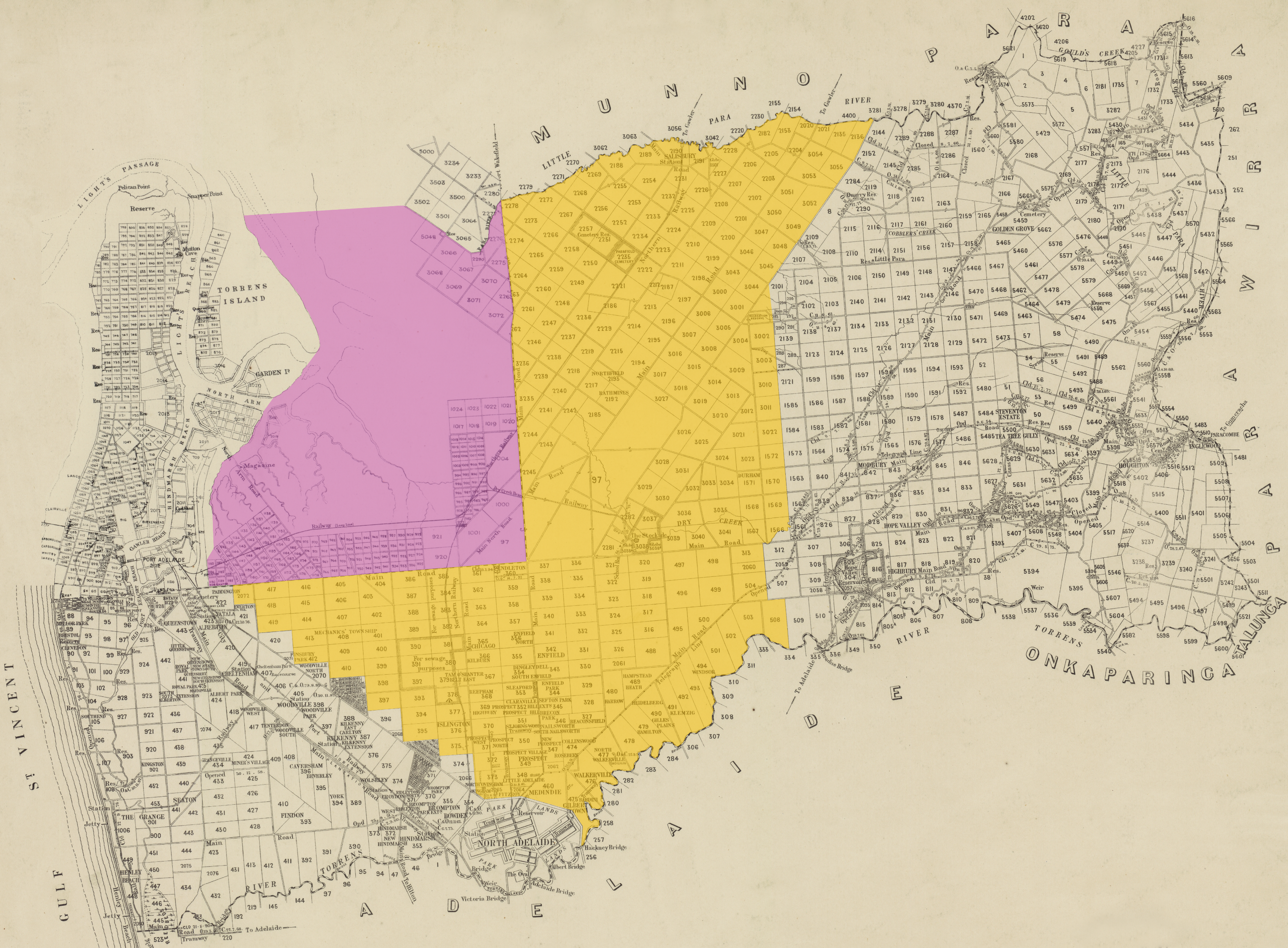
Map showing the boundaries of the council in 1853 with relation to the Hundred of Yatala (shaded in yellow) and the Hundred of Port Adelaide (shaded in purple)

The council was proclaimed on 16 June 1853 with Thomas Abbot, Daniel Brady, John Chamberlain, John Harvey and John Ragless, the younger, appointed as inaugural councillors.

At the time its establishment, Yatala District Council area covered approximately 58 square miles (150 km^{2}) on what is now the inner suburbs north-west, north and north-east of Adelaide. It originally extended from Little Para River in the north which was the boundary with the Hundred of Munno Para (where Salisbury Township was established in 1847-48 by John Harvey), to the River Torrens in the south and south-east, and to Torrens Road and the borders of the former City of Port Adelaide in the west. The council area covered a major central portion of the cadastral Hundred of Yatala. North Adelaide's parklands and the River Torrens formed the southern boundary of the council area.

The council area included the villages of Enfield, Prospect, Klemzig and Walkerville. Surveying of Yatala was started in 1837 and continued until completed in late 1850s. The survey showed the area had limited fresh water.

The first Clerk, Collector, and Surveyor to the District Road Board of the Hundred of Yatala, was appointed in 1850. This was architect Edward Prowse, who later came to prominence in Geelong, Victoria. Prowse resigned in 1852.

In 1854 Yatala Labour Prison was established near Dry Creek, which passed from east to west through the centre of Yatala. The location of the prison meant inmates were able to work at the creek quarrying rock for roads and construction.

In the first six years after the establishment of Yatala council, two pockets of land were removed from the council area to be local government areas in their own right. A part at the northern end was taken for the new District Council of Munno Para West The new Village of Walkerville split from Yatala on 5 July 1855. In November 1855 and April 1859 further portions of Yatala District Council were moved to the Village of Walkerville council.

Baillière's South Australian gazetteer and road guide, published in 1866, contains a brief description of the Yatala council area. It recorded the population of the district as being 3091, the number of houses as 642, the cultivated land as being 15,194 acres (6,149 ha), and the council chair as J. W. A. Sudholz of Gilles Plains.

In 1868 the District Council of Yatala was divided at Dry Creek into the District Council of Yatala South and the District Council of Yatala North. Yatala North ultimately was absorbed into the new District Council of Salisbury in 1933. Yatala South ultimately became the District Council of Enfield in 1933, after the much earlier severance of land for the Village of Prospect in 1872

== Neighbouring local government ==
The following adjacent local government bodies co-existed with the Yatala council:

- District Council of Munno Para West lay immediately north from its establishment shortly after Yatala council in 1853, and lay north west from its extension westwards in 1888.
- District Council of Munno Para East lay north east from its establishment in 1854.
- District Council of Highercombe lay immediately east. The District Council of Tea Tree Gully seceded from the north part of Highercombe in 1858, creating another eastern neighbouring council.
- District Council of East Torrens lay south east, across the River Torrens until the northern part seceded to form the District Council of Payneham in 1854. The District Council of Stepney seceded from the west part of Payneham in 1867, creating another south eastern neighbouring council to Yatala just a year before Yatala itself was split into smaller councils.
- City of Adelaide northern parklands lay immediately south.
- District Council of Hindmarsh (established 1853) lay south west until it split into the District Council of Woodville and Corporate Town of Hindmarsh in 1875.
- The portside cluster – Town of Port Adelaide, Portland Estate council, and Queenstown and Alberton council, from their respective establishments in 1855, 1859 and 1864 – lay immediately west of Yatala council.

== Chairmen ==
- John Chamberlain (1853–1855)
- John Ragless Jnr. (1855–1858)
- R. K. Spotswood (1858-1859)
- Joseph Broadstock (1859-1862)
- William Turvey (1862)
- Joseph Grundy (1862-1863)
- A. M. Goodhall (1863-1864)
- C. F. Folland Snr. (1864)
- A. M. Goodhall (1864-1865)
- C. F. Beaumont (1865-1866)
- Thomas Dayman (1866)
- G. W. W. Sudholz (1866-1867)
- Thomas Turner (1867-1868)
