= District Council of Rosewater =

District Council of Rosewater South Australia
- Coordinates: 34.846°S 138.503°E
- Established: 1877
- Abolished: 1899
- Council seat: Rosewater
LGAs around District Council of Rosewater:
Port Adelaide; Birkenhead		Yatala; Yatala North
Port Adelaide	District Council of Rosewater	Yatala; Yatala South
Port Adelaide; Queenstown and Alberton	Yatala; Yatala South	Yatala; Yatala South

The District Council of Rosewater was a local government area of South Australia immediately east of Port Adelaide from 1877 to 1899.

== History ==
The council was established in 1877, centred on the 'Rosewater' subdivision on Grand Junction Road, about 1.8 kilometres (1.1 mi) south east of Port Adelaide.

The council was abolished in 1899, being the last small neighbour of Port Adelaide to be absorbed into the larger corporate town.
