= City of Henley and Grange =

City of Henley and Grange South Australia
- Coordinates: 34°55′01″S 138°29′38″E
- Population: 6,000 (1936)
  - Density: 520/km^{2} (1,330/sq mi)
- Established: 2 December 1915
- Abolished: 1 January 1997
- Area: 11.65 km^{2} (4.5 sq mi)
- Council seat: Henley Beach
LGAs around City of Henley and Grange:
Woodville	Woodville
City of Henley and Grange	Woodville; West Torrens
West Torrens	West Torrens

The City of Henley and Grange was a local government area in South Australia from 1915 to 1997, seated at the Adelaide seaside suburb of Henley Beach.

At the time of its establishment, it comprised four wards, each spanning the width of the local government area. From north to south they were: Grange, Kirkcaldy, Henley and South Henley.

== History ==
On 2 December 1915, the seaside communities of Henley Beach and Grange in the District Council of Woodville and West Beach in the District Council of West Torrens seceded to form the Municipality of Henley and Grange.

In 1936, it covered an area of 4.5 square miles (12 km^{2}) and had an estimated population of 6,000 people.

On 11 June 1970, it was declared to be a city with the municipality being named "The City of Henley and Grange" and the corporation being named “The Corporation of the City of Henley and Grange".

On 1 January 1997, the City of Henley and Grange was amalgamated with the City of Hindmarsh Woodville to form the present-day City of Charles Sturt.

The old Henley Civic Centre on the corner of North Street and Seaview Road, Henley Beach, now houses the Henley Beach Library branch of the Charles Sturt Library Service.

== Neighbouring local government ==
The following adjacent local government bodies co-existed with the Henley and Grange council:

- District Council of Woodville lay north, north east and east. Later it was known instead as the City of Woodville.
- District Council of West Torrens (established 1853) lay east, south east and south. In 1950, West Torrens attained municipality status and was known instead as the City of West Torrens.

== Mayors ==
The following persons were elected to serve as mayor for the following terms:

- James Hugh Sinclair (1915–1916)
- G. S. Wright (1916–1918)
- W. F. Harrison (1918–?)
- Michael Kerrison (prior to 1924)
- W. Barry
- Ewart Wilfred Mitton (in office in 1936 after four terms)
- Hermann Gaetjens (1924–1925)
- Cyril Chambers (1932–1934)
- V. Harvey (1938)
- G. T. Gurner (1950)
