= John Raymond Dyer =

Australian local government politician

John Dyer
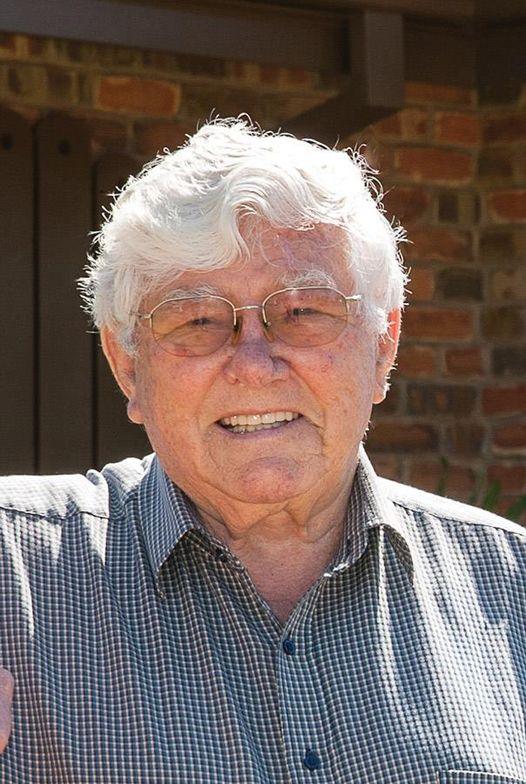
- Born: John Raymond Dyer; 28 April 1930; Adelaide, South Australia, Australia
- Died: 13 October 2017 (aged 87); Adelaide, South Australia, Australia
- Occupation: Master Builder

John Raymond Dyer OAM (28 April 1930 – 13 October 2017) was a prominent figure in South Australian local government, serving as the Mayor of the City of Hindmarsh and Woodville from 1979 to 1997, and as Mayor of the City of Charles Sturt from 1997 to 2000. He held the position of President of the Australian Local Government Association during his tenure.

Dyer was renowned for his contributions to urban development, particularly in the West Lakes area and his significant contribution was honoured posthumously by having the West Lakes area named after him, now known as John Dyer Lake

In 1986 Dyer was awarded the Medal of the Order of Australia (OAM) in recognition of his extensive service to the community and the Centenary Medal in 2001. His notable contributions spanned various sectors including development, sport and the development of Football Park, and others, health, finance, and local government advocacy. These achievements led to his induction as a Freeman of the City of Charles Sturt, further cementing his legacy in the community he served diligently.

Throughout his lifetime Dyer achieved numerous accolades, held positions on various boards, and made significant service contributions. Among his notable roles Dyer was deeply involved with the Charles Sturt Memorial Museum Trust, serving as chair until 2002. He later rejoined as a board member in 2009 and continued until his retirement in 2014.
