= District Council of Queenstown and Alberton =

- Local government area
- Coordinates: 34.8608°S 138.5141°E
- Country: Australia
- State: South Australia
- Established: 1864
- Abolished: 1898
- Council seat: Alberton
LGAs around District Council of Queenstown and Alberton
Portland Estate; Port Adelaide	Portland Estate; Port Adelaide	Rosewater
Glanville; Woodville	District Council of Queenstown and Alberton	Yatala; Yatala South
Hindmarsh; Woodville	Hindmarsh; Woodville	Hindmarsh; Woodville

The District Council of Queenstown and Alberton was a local government area of South Australia established in 1864 and abolished in 1898.

The council was named for its constituent suburban townships of Queenstown and Alberton (originally Queen's Town and Albert Town, named for Queen Victoria and her consort, Prince Albert).

== History ==
The council was proclaimed on 20 October 1864 and divided south east to north west by the new Port Road into two wards - one for each constituent township. The inaugural councillors appointed by the governor were James Page, Thomas Bails, Samuel Wilson, John Formby and William Wheewall.

On 2 June 1898 the council was amalgamated into the Town of Port Adelaide, the latest in what became a series of annexations of small port-side councils into the larger corporate township.

== Neighbouring local government ==
The following adjacent local government bodies co-existed with the Queenstown and Alberton council:

- District Council of Portland Estate (established 1859) lay immediately north and north west. In 1884 it was amalgamated with the Town of Port Adelaide making the latter Queenstown and Alberton's northern neighbour. Four years later, Queenstown and Alberton was also amalgamated in to the Port Adelaide council.
- District Council of Rosewater lay north east from its establishment in 1877.
- District Council of Yatala lay east. In 1868, Yatala council was split into two, at the approximate course of Dry Creek. From that time the District Council of Yatala South became Queenstown and Alberton's eastern neighbour.
- District Council of Hindmarsh (established 1853) lay south east, south and south west until the part adjoining Queenstown and Alberton became the District Council of Woodville in 1875.
- District Council of Glanville, established in 1864 a few months prior to Queenstown and Alberton council, lay west. In 1888 when it amalgamated with the Woodville council, the latter also became Queenstown and Alberton's western neighbour.
