= Town of Hindmarsh =

- Local government area
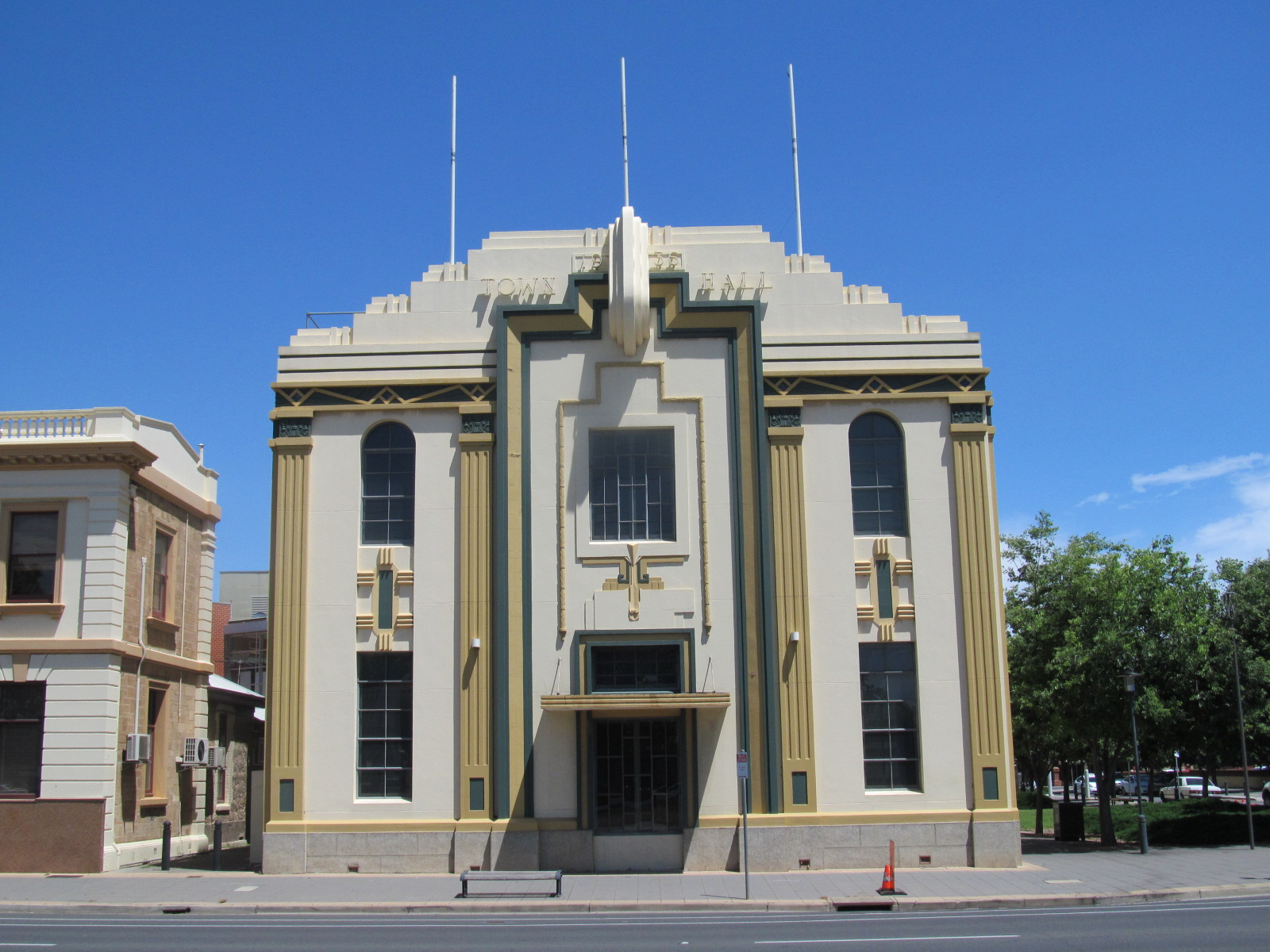
- Hindmarsh Town Hall in 2012

- Coordinates: 34.9070°S 138.5699°E
- Country: Australia
- State: South Australia
- Established: 1874
- Abolished: 1993
- Council seat: Hindmarsh
LGAs around Town of Hindmarsh
Woodville	Woodville	Yatala South/Enfield
Woodville	Town of Hindmarsh	Yatala South/Enfield; Prospect
West Torrens; Thebarton	West Torrens; Thebarton	Adelaide

The Town of Hindmarsh was a local government area in South Australia from 1874 to 1993, encompassing on the inner north west Adelaide suburbs of Hindmarsh, Bowden and Brompton.

== History ==
The Corporation of the Town of Hindmarsh was proclaimed on 1 October 1874 by the severance of the "townships of Hindmarsh, Bowden and Brompton" from the District Council of Hindmarsh. Benjamin Taylor was proclaimed the inaugural mayor, with the councillors of Hindmarsh, Bowden and Brompton wards being proclaimed, respectively, as Carl Ferdinand Trapmann and Josiah Mitton, Ephraim Gould and Richard Hayley, and Henry Betteridge and William Shearing.

Apart from Hindmarsh, Bowden and Brompton, the town boundaries also included the townships of Croydon and Ridleyton and the land occupied by the modern suburbs of West Hindmarsh, Renown Park, and the portion of modern Ovingham west of the Gawler railway line.

In 1875, the remainder of the older District Council of Hindmarsh moved its seat from Hindmarsh to Woodville and changed its name to District Council of Woodville, distinguishing it from the Corporate Town of Hindmarsh for more than a century until the two bodies were merged again as the City of Hindmarsh and Woodville in 1993.

== Neighbouring local government ==
The following adjacent local government bodies co-existed with the Hindmarsh town council:

- District Council of Yatala South (established 1868) lay north east and east. From 1933 it was called District Council of Enfield and from 1953, the City of Enfield.
- District Council of Prospect (established 1872) lay immediately east.
- City of Adelaide northern parklands lay south east.
- District Council of West Torrens lay immediately south and south west, across the River Torrens until 1883, after which time the Town of Thebarton was the Town of Hindmarsh's southern and south western neighbour.
- District Council of Woodville lay west, north west and north until it was reunited with the Town of Hindmarsh in 1993.
