= City of Woodville =

- Local government area
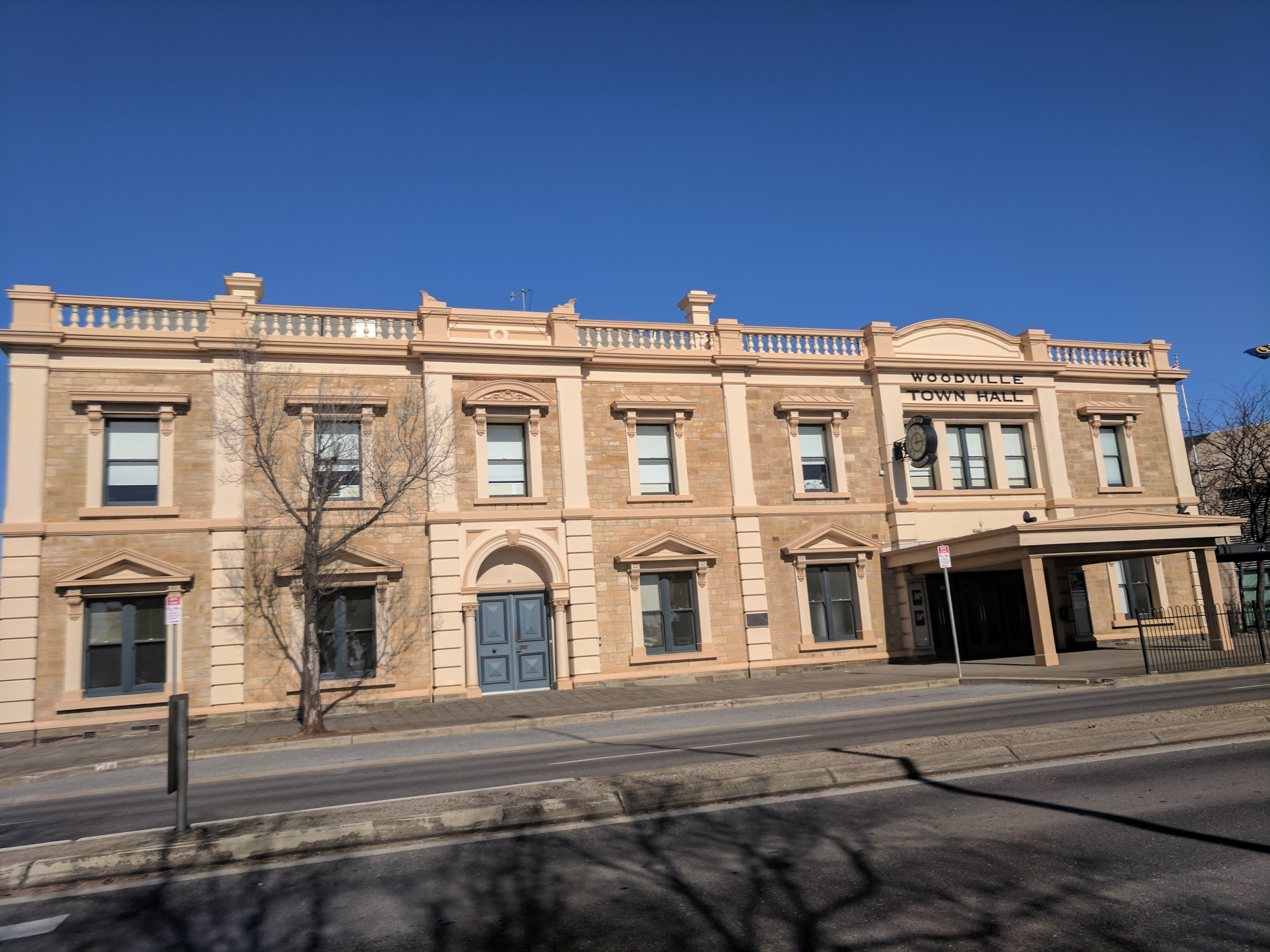
- The Woodville council chambers were housed in the southern portion of the Woodville Town Hall complex from 1903 to 1993.

- Coordinates: 34.8788°S 138.5379°E
- Country: Australia
- State: South Australia
- Established: 1875
- Abolished: 1993
- Council seat: Woodville

Area (1930)
  - Total: 39.5 km^{2} (15.25 sq mi)
LGAs around City of Woodville
Town of Semaphore	Queenstown and Alberton; Port Adelaide	Yatala South/Enfield
Glanville	City of Woodville	Yatala South/Enfield; Hindmarsh
Henley and Grange	West Torrens	Hindmarsh

The City of Woodville was a local government area in South Australia from 1875 to 1993, seated at the inner north west Adelaide suburb of Woodville.

== History ==
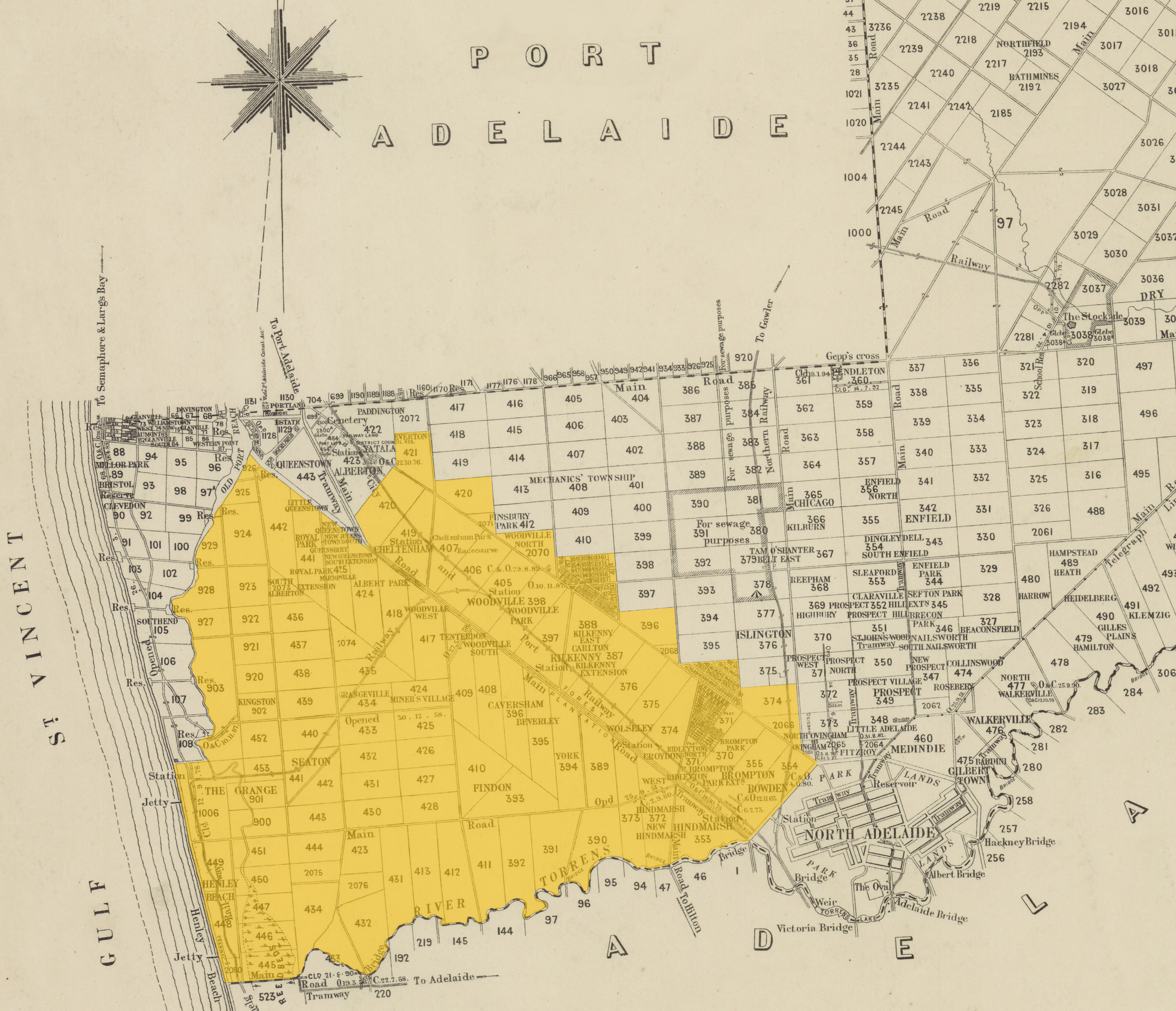
Map showing the boundaries of the District Council of Hindmarsh in relation to the Hundred of Yatala. The area was split between the Woodville council and the Town of Hindmarsh from 1874.

The District Council of Hindmarsh, covering the north west suburbs of Adelaide, had been established since 1853, providing local government to land that was to be Woodville council. In 1874 the most populous parts of the district council successfully lobbied to secede and formed the Town of Hindmarsh adjacent to the Adelaide parklands. The remainder, still called District Council of Hindmarsh, formed the boundaries of what would one day be the City of Woodville.

Late in the following year on 30 December 1875, at the request of ratepayers in order to distinguish itself from the newer corporate town, the name was changed to District Council of Woodville by state government proclamation.

The council offices relocated from Port Road to the present-day City of Charles Sturt civic centre on Woodville Road at Woodville in 1903.

As part of the District Councils Act 1887 consolidation of local government in the state, the rump of the District Council of Glanville was amalgamated into Woodville council as the Davenport ward in 1888. This closely following the creation of the Town of Semaphore which removed a significantly-populated portion of Glanville. This now meant that the Woodville council's western boundary was the coastline from the Torrens to Fort Glanville.

In December 1915, the seaside communities of Henley Beach and Grange seceded from Woodville council to form the Municipality of Henley and Grange.

The Woodville and Hindmarsh councils were reunited in 1993 as the City of Hindmarsh Woodville. Four years later, Henley and Grange council was also reunited to form the present-day City of Charles Sturt, in 1997.

== Neighbouring local government ==
The following adjacent local government bodies co-existed with the Hindmarsh council:

- District Council of Glanville (established 1860) lay west and north west until 1888 when it was merged into Woodville council as its Davenport ward. From this time the Town of Semaphore became Woodville council's north western neighbour until it was merged into the Town of Port Adelaide in 1900. In 1901, Port Adelaide attained municipality status and was known instead as the City of Port Adelaide.
- District Council of Queenstown and Alberton (established 1864) lay immediately north until it also was merged into the Town of Port Adelaide in 1898.
- District Council of Yatala South (established 1868) lay north east and east. From 1933, Yatala South was instead known as the District Council of Enfield, and, not much later, the City of Enfield.
- Town of Hindmarsh lay immediately east and south east.
- District Council of West Torrens (established 1853) lay immediately south, across the River Torrens. In 1950, West Torrens attained municipality status and was known instead as the City of West Torrens.
- City of Henley and Grange lay south west from its establishment in 1915 out of Woodville and West Torrens councils.
