= Hundred of Yatala =

Yatala
- Cadastral division
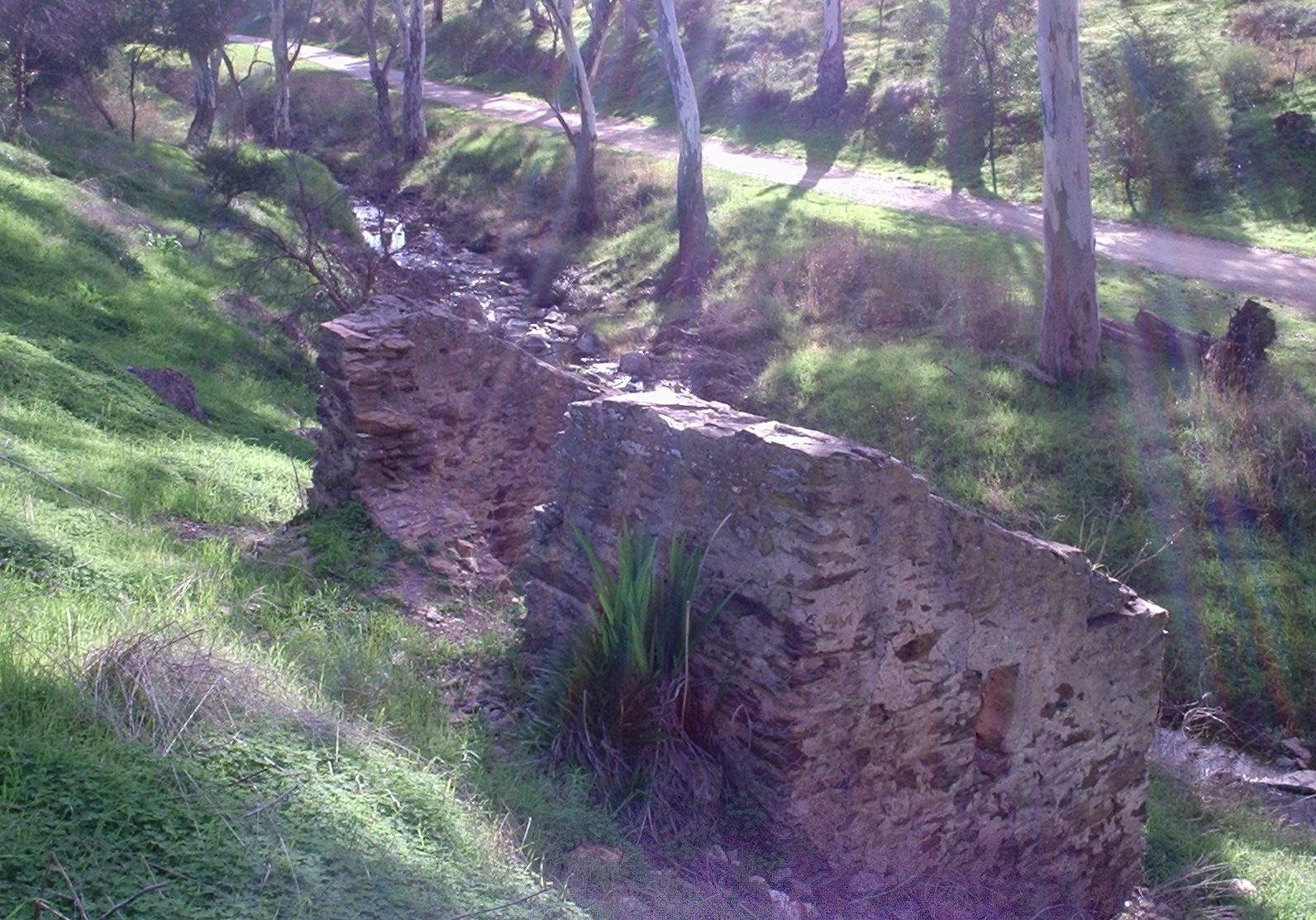
- The Dry Creek watercourse in the suburb of Walkley Heights

- Coordinates: 34.82°S 138.66°E
- Country: Australia
- State: South Australia
- Established: 29 October 1846
- County: Adelaide
Lands administrative divisions around Yatala
Port Adelaide	Munno Para	Para Wirra
Port Adelaide	Yatala	Talunga
Gulf St Vincent	Adelaide	Onkaparinga

The Hundred of Yatala is a cadastral unit of hundred in South Australia covering much of the Adelaide metropolitan area north of the River Torrens. It is one of the eleven hundreds of the County of Adelaide stretching from the Torrens in the south to the Little Para River in the north; and spanning from the coast in the west to the Adelaide foothills in the east. It is roughly bisected from east to west by Dry Creek. It was named in 1846 by Governor Frederick Robe, Yatala being likely derived from yartala, a Kaurna word referring to the flooded state of the plain either side of Dry Creek after heavy rain.

== Etymology ==
Contemporary Australian linguists believe the name "Yatala" is derived from "yartala", a Kaurna word which likely means "water running by the side of a river" or "inundation" or "cascade" or similar. South Australian historian Geoff Manning has implied that this refers to the swampy morass that occurred when heavy rain inundated the usually-dry plain either side of Dry Creek. The descriptive term "yartala" is thought to have been "co-opted by the colonists [as "Yatala"] in their endeavours to name [various] things including a government schooner," the Yatala, in 1865.

According to Rob Amery (2009), "Yatala" had been used as a place name by white settlers of the Adelaide Plains since 1836, referring initially to the River Torrens (called Yertala by the Kaurna people while in flood) and later to the land north of the Torrens, stretching from the coast at Port Adelaide to the foothills at Tea Tree Gully. Yatala was thus a natural choice for the land administration division in 1846.

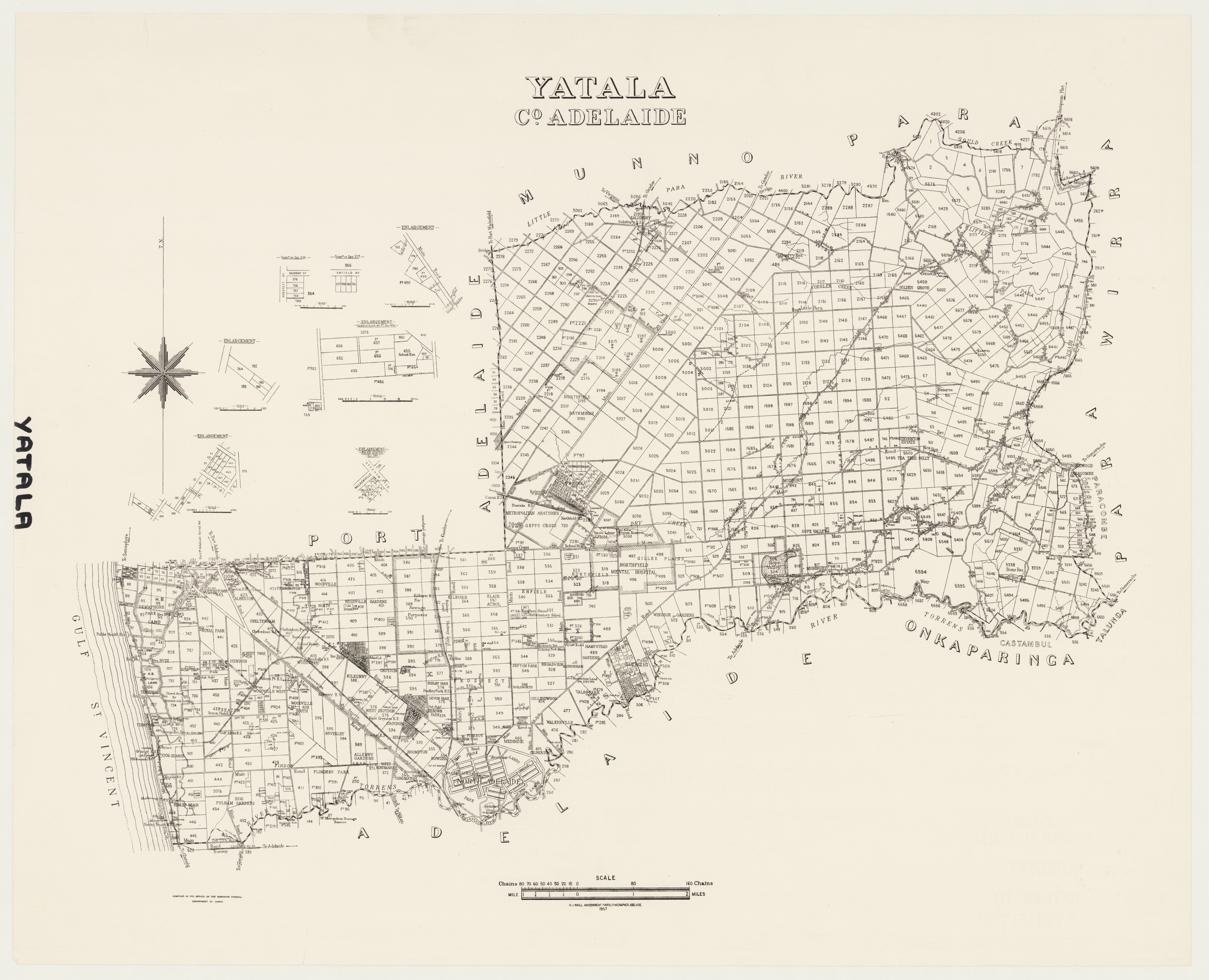
Plan of the Hundred of Yatala, 1957

== Local government ==
The Adelaide City council was established in 1842, bringing local government to North Adelaide and the north parklands on the south edge of the hundred. The District Council of Hindmarsh was established in June 1853 and encompassed all the land south west of modern Torrens Road and south of the future portside councils of Queenstown and Alberton and Glanville. The District Council of Yatala was established days later and occupied a large central portion of the hundred as well as eastern parts of the Hundred of Port Adelaide. It approximately extended from modern Torrens Road and the North Arm of Barker Inlet in the west to the west border of the modern Tea Tree Gully council in the east. Shortly thereafter, in July of the same year, the District Council of Highercombe was established in the east of the hundred, bringing the whole hundred under local governance.

As various parts of the original District Council of Yatala were separated — parts north of Dry Creek for Salisbury council and parts in the south for Walkerville and Prospect councils — the original name of 'Yatala' was obscured and finally lost (to local government) when the last remaining namesake, Yatala South council was renamed in 1935 to Enfield.

The following local government areas of South Australia are situated inside (or largely inside) the bounds of the hundred as of 2017:

- City of Salisbury (except portion north of the Little Para River)
- City of Tea Tree Gully
- City of Port Adelaide Enfield (portion south of Grand Junction Road and east of Port Wakefield Road, approximating the former City of Enfield)
- City of Charles Sturt (except portion south of Henley Beach Road)
- City of Prospect
- City of Adelaide (portion north of the River Torrens)
- Town of Walkerville

Parts of the Adelaide Hills Council area (Paracombe, Houghton, Upper Hermitage and Lower Hermitage, west of Millbrook and Inglewood) and the City of Playford (Sampson Flat west of Shillabeer Road) also overlap the far eastern portion of the hundred.

== See also ==
- Lands administrative divisions of South Australia
