= City of Hindmarsh Woodville =

Local government area in South Australia

Coordinates: 34°52′44″S 138°32′17″E

The City of Hindmarsh Woodville was a local government area in South Australia from 1993 to 1997 seated at the inner north west Adelaide suburbs of Hindmarsh and Woodville.

It came into existence on 2 August 1993 with the amalgamation of the Town of Hindmarsh and the City of Woodville as the City of Hindmarsh and Woodville, following a Local Government Advisory Commission report on 16 July that was supportive of the merger. It later dropped the "and" from its name.

The council was composed of a mayor, 6 aldermen and 22 councillors. It retained the eleven wards of its two predecessor councils (Albert Park, Beverley, Brompton-Bowden, Cheltenham, Croydon, Findon, Hindmarsh, Seaton, Semaphore Park, West Croydon and Woodville), each of which were represented by two councillors. John Dyer, the last mayor of Woodville, was appointed mayor at its inception and served throughout its existence.

The council was short-lived, as on 1 January 1997 it amalgamated with the City of Henley and Grange to form the City of Charles Sturt.
