= District Council of Glanville =

Local government area in South Australia

Coordinates: 34°50′42″S 138°29′31″E

The District Council of Glanville was a local government area in South Australia from 1864 to 1888.

== History ==
It was first proclaimed on 14 July 1864. A month later on 11 August, another proclamation rescinded the initial proclamation, due to an erroneous boundary definition, and provided a correct description of the district's boundaries. The district included a narrow strip of the Hundred of Yatala west of the Port Adelaide Creek and a small southwestern portion of the Hundred of Port Adelaide south of the Semaphore jetty and west of the Port Adelaide township. The modern suburb of Glanville is at the extreme north east of the historic district council area. Fort Glanville and Glanville Hall (of Glanville Hall Estate) in the modern suburbs of Semaphore Park and Semaphore South, respectively, were somewhat more central.

Although debates were held over the years regarding construction of a permanent council chambers or hall, the council used chambers in the Thornton Hotel until its end. In 1881, councillors were elected from three wards: North Glanville, South Glanville, and Davenport. Much of the district and the adjacent District Council of Lefevre's Peninsula was severed on 20 December 1883 as the new Corporate Town of Semaphore. The new boundaries limited the viability of the council, and the Semaphore council debated as early as January 1884 whether the Glanville council had become defunct as a result of the changes. However, it remained in existence until 5 January 1888, when the remaining portions were merged into the District Council of Woodville as its Davenport Ward following their forced amalgamation by the District Councils Act 1887.

== Chairmen ==
- C. H. T. Connor (1865–1866)
- G. Willimott (1870–1871)
- J. M. Sinclair (1872–1874)
- J. Legoe (1880–1882)
- G. Willimott (1882–1883)
