= City of Enfield =

- Local government area
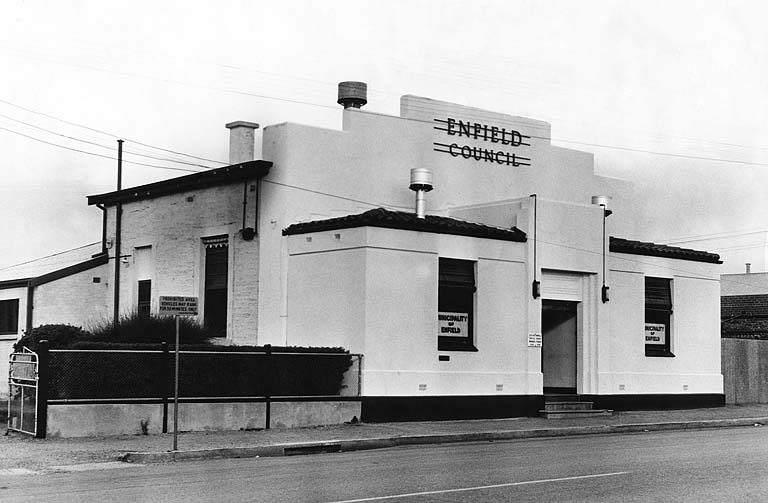
- Second Enfield council chamber, Rakes Road, Enfield

- Coordinates: 34°51′9″S 138°36′3″E
- Country: Australia
- State: South Australia
- Established: 1868
- Abolished: 1996
- Council seat: Enfield

Area (1872–1930)
  - Total: 47.3 km^{2} (18.3 sq mi)
LGAs around City of Enfield
Port Adelaide	Yatala North; Salisbury	Highercombe; Tea Tree Gully
Woodville; Hindmarsh Woodville	City of Enfield	Payneham/ Campbelltown
Hindmarsh; Hindmarsh Woodville	Adelaide; Prospect	Walkerville; Payneham/ Campbelltown

The City of Enfield (formerly District Council of Yatala South) was a local government area of South Australia from 1868 to 1996. It was known as Yatala South up until 1933, which was named for its local government area predecessor, the District Council of Yatala, and known as Enfield thereafter.

The seat of the City of Enfield was the township of Enfield, approximately 7 kilometres (4.3 mi) north of the Adelaide central business district, named after Enfield Town in the London borough of same name. In 1868, the council area ranged approximately from Dry Creek in the north to the River Torrens in the south east and Torrens Road (unrelated to the river) in the south west.

== History ==
=== Early years ===
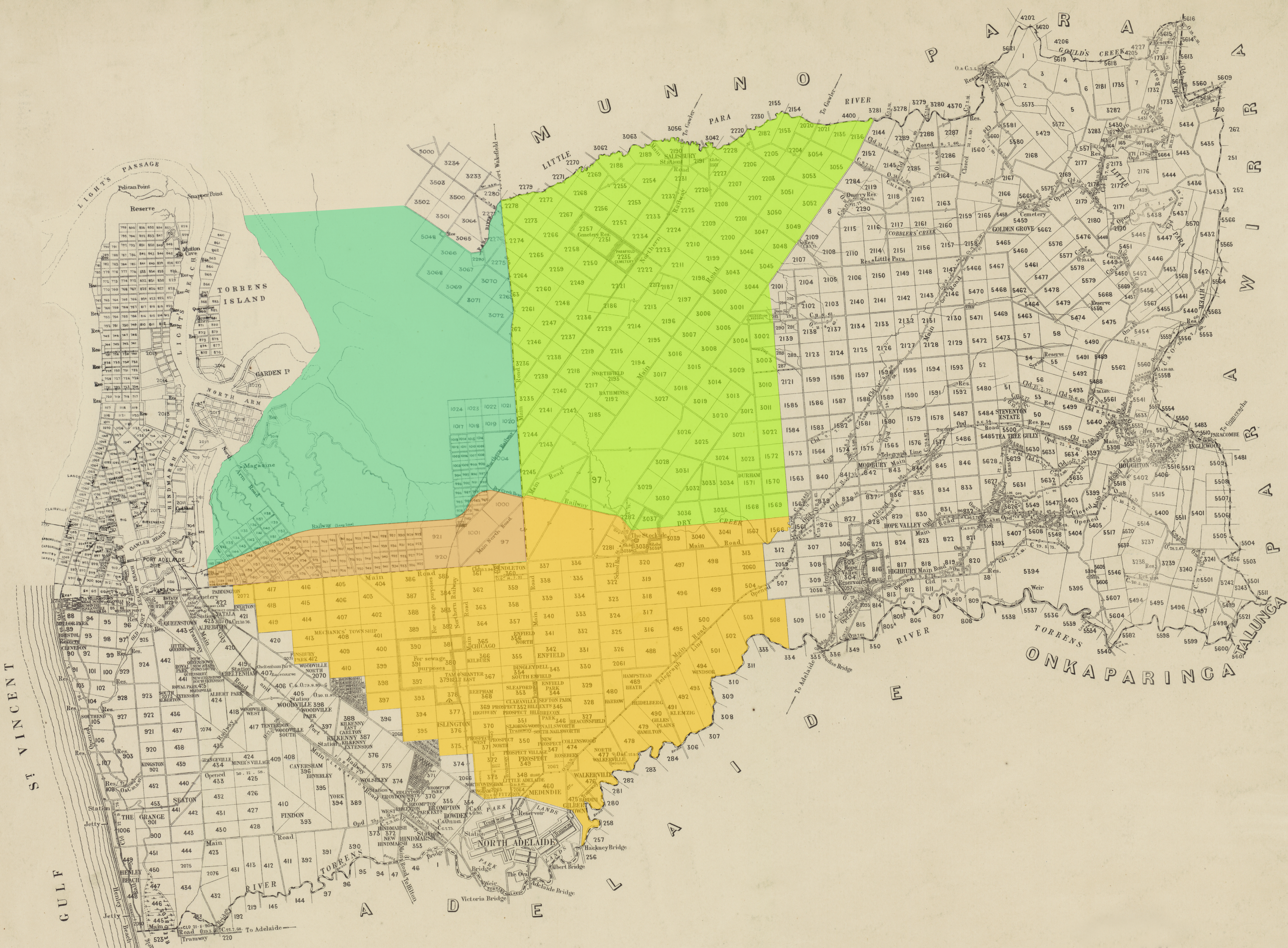
Map showing the boundaries of Yatala North and Yatala South immediately after the 1868 split, with relation to the Hundred of Yatala (shaded in green and yellow) and the Hundred of Port Adelaide (shaded in cyan and orange)

The District Council of Yatala South was established on 18 June 1868 when the District Council of Yatala was divided at Dry Creek and the Dry Creek-Port Adelaide railway line into Yatala South and Yatala North. The council office was located near Gepps Cross intersection at the northern end of the suburb of Enfield.

The division still did not satisfy everyone, as the council had trouble collecting rates from the rural north-western areas; and Prospect ratepayers who did pay, believed they were not getting their fair share of roadworks and that the council office was too far away at Gepps Cross. Led by council member James Harrington, Prospect Village residents petitioned for separation from Yatala South, and on 1 August 1872 part was severed to form the new District Council of Prospect. This reduced Yatala South in area by about 3 square miles (7.8 km^{2}).

In 1927 the second Enfield council chamber, located on Regency Road, Enfield was erected.

In 1930, the recorded population of Yatala South was 4,979.

Well over half a century since its establishment, on 22 June 1933, Yatala South was renamed to be the District Council of Enfield following lobbying from residents. The district council was now named after its major population centre and council seat, the township of Enfield.

=== Municipality ===
In April 1944 the Enfield council was granted municipal status, becoming the Town of Enfield. In January 1953, the population had reached a point where the municipality was granted city status and known thereafter as the City of Enfield. The chairman of the council became the mayor from 1944.

In March 1996 the City of Enfield merged with the City of Port Adelaide to form the City of Port Adelaide Enfield.

== Chairmen and mayors ==
=== Yatala South (Chairman) ===
- G. W. W. Sudholz (1868–1876) (Note: Likely the son of J. W. A. Sudholz.)
- John Williams (1876-1885)
- J. L. Thompson (1885-1886)
- George Morris (1886-1889)
- Robert Emery (1889-1893)
- John Francis (1893-1895)
- John Duncanson (1895-1896)
- James R. Musson (1896-1897)
- Andrew W. Shillabeer (1897-1899)
- James R. Musson (1899-1901)
- William Duthie (1904-1905)
- John Williams (1905-1908)
- Andrew W. Shillabeer (1908-1922)
- William Duthie (?)
- Thomas Keith Shutter (1931–1933)

=== Enfield ===
- Thomas Keith Shutter (1933–1938)
- Arthur George Owen Gray (1938–1943)
- Keith Teller (1943–1944)
- Harold Frank Stevens (1944–1947)
- Thomas Keith Shutter (1947–1955)
- Thomas Turner (1955–1964)
- Joseph Robert Chaplin (1964–1968)
- Roy Donald Amer (1968–1971)
- Ray J Norton (1971–1974)
- (1974–1976) ?
- Ray J Norton (1976–1988)
- Ronald Henry Charles Bonner (1988–1989)
- Roy Donald Amer (1989–1993)
- Michael Charles Stock (1993–1996)

== See also ==
- Clearview, South Australia
- Klemzig, South Australia
- Hampstead Gardens, South Australia
- Regency Park, South Australia
- Angle Park, South Australia
- Ferryden Park, South Australia
