= Transport in Adelaide =

Transportation network of Adelaide, Australia

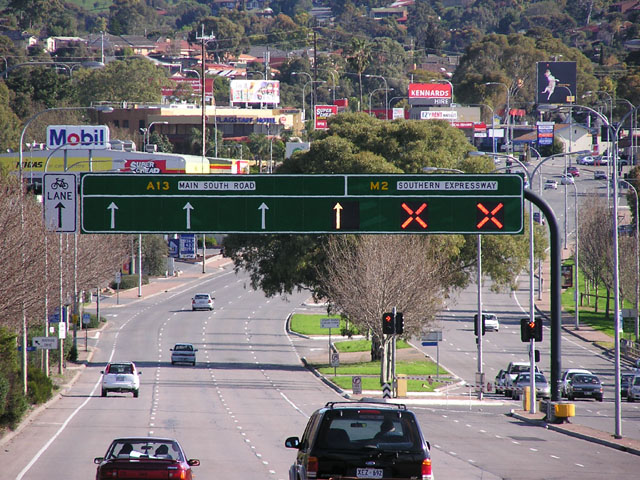
Main South Road at the northern end of the Southern Expressway during morning peak (looking south), closed to south-bound traffic. This has now changed.

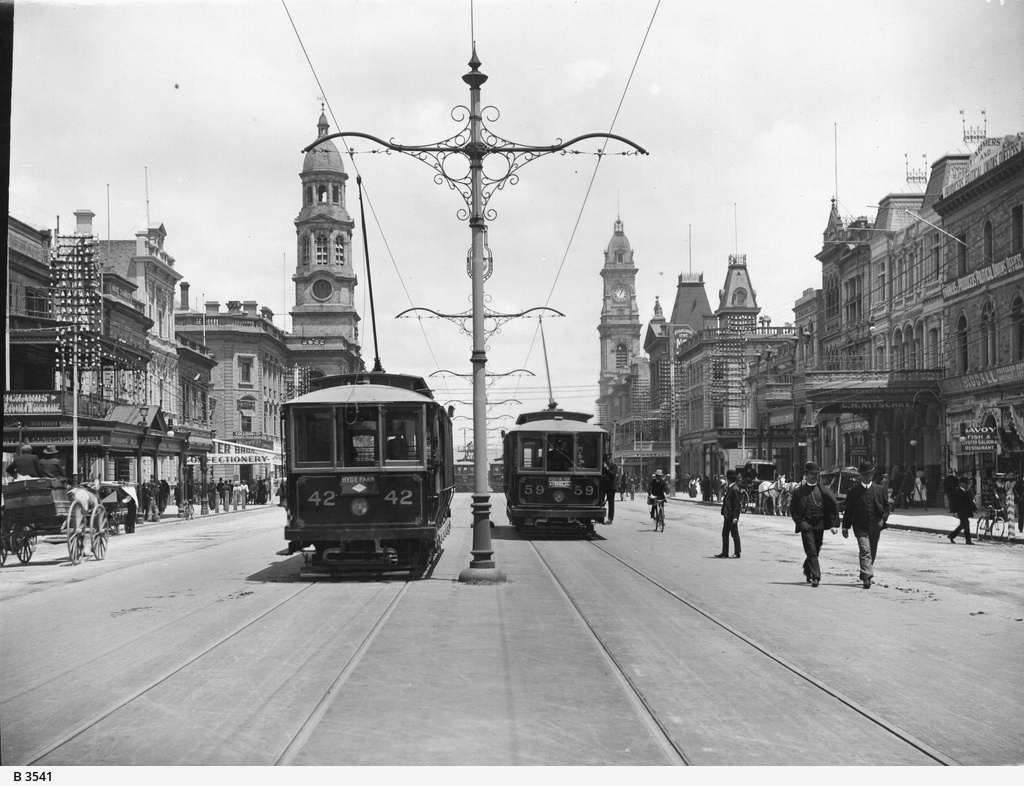
Two trams on King William Street, one of which is travelling to Hyde Park (left), circa 1909.

The metropolitan area of Adelaide, South Australia is served by a wide variety of transport. Being centrally located on the Australian mainland, it forms a hub for east–west and north–south routes. The road network includes major expressways such as the Southern Expressway, the South Eastern Freeway, the Port River Expressway, the Northern Expressway and the South Road Superway. The city also has a public transport system managed by Adelaide Metro, consisting of a contracted bus system including the O-Bahn Busway (a guided busway), six metropolitan railway lines, and the Glenelg-Adelaide-Hindmarsh Tram. According to a study conducted by the Australian Bureau of Statistics, Adelaide has the highest passenger vehicle travel to work (84%) and the second lowest proportion of people walking to work (2.9%)–something that is being combated by the South Australian government in an effort to increase citizen ridership and use of public transport.

== Roads ==
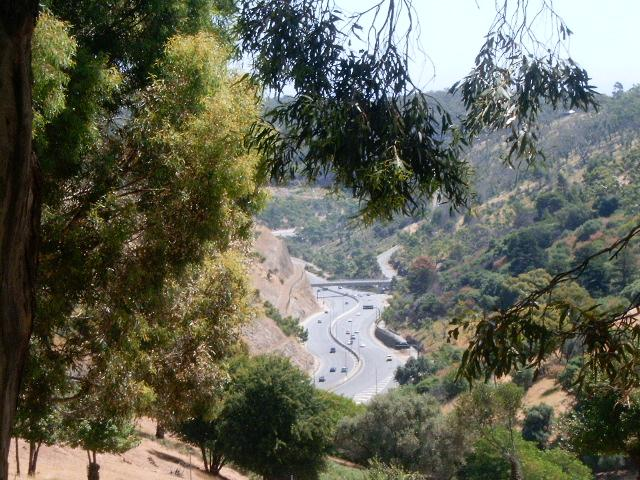
The Mount Osmond Interchange on the South Eastern Freeway.

Road transport in Adelaide has historically been comparatively easier than many of the other Australian cities, with a well-defined city layout and wide multiple-lane roads from the beginning of its development. Adelaide has been called a "twenty-minute city", with commuters having been able to travel from metropolitan outskirts to the city proper in twenty minutes or less. However, the Royal Automobile Association now considers these roads are inadequate to cope with Adelaide's growing road traffic volumes.

In 1964 the 'M.A.T.S.' plan (Metropolitan Adelaide Transport Study) was commissioned by the Government of South Australia. It examined establishing a large network of highways along Adelaide's main urban transport corridors. The plan went as far as the State Government of the day purchasing land along Adelaide's major roads, in preparation for highway construction. However, later State Governments abandoned the plan during the 1970s. The consequences of the political rejection of this plan are now being realised as increased traffic has caused travel times to increase, and congestion on main thoroughfares such as South Road has become a daily reality.

Adelaide is connected to Port Wakefield Road and the Sturt Highway in the north, and the South Eastern Freeway in the South East. The Southern Expressway acts as a bypass for congested South Road in the southern suburbs of Adelaide.

== Bus ==
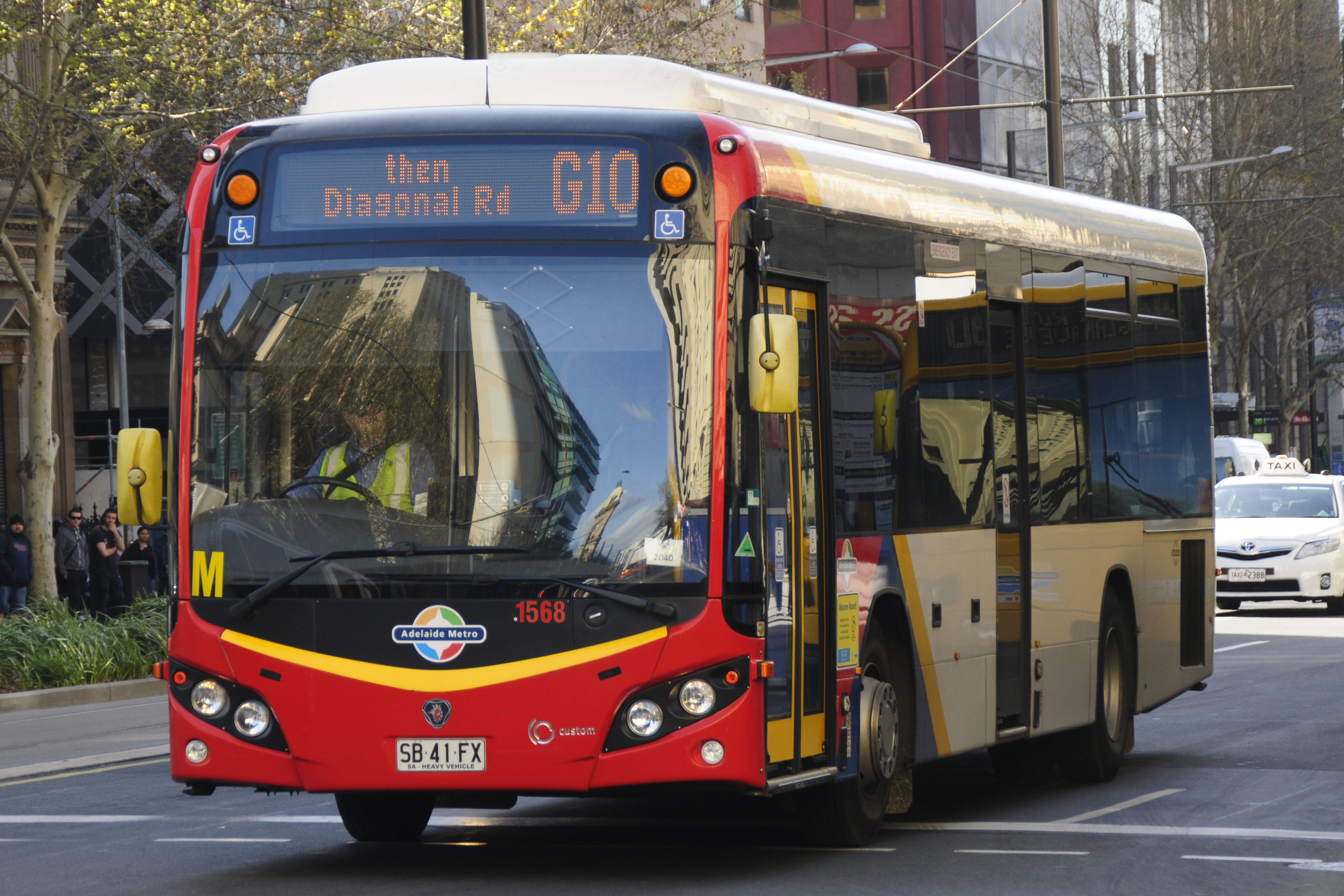
A Custom Coaches bodied Scania bus on King William Street; one of Adelaide's main thoroughfares.

The focus of Adelaide's public transport system is the large fleet of diesel and natural gas powered buses. The majority of services terminate at the city-centre or at a suburban interchange. Buses get priority on many roads and intersections, with dedicated bus lanes and 'B'-light bus-only phases at many traffic lights.

The Adelaide Metro buses are operated by:

- Torrens Transit – East-West (includes City Free), Outer North East and Outer North contract areas
- Torrens Connect – North-South contract area, including the 300 suburban connector and O-Bahn services and the light rail
- SouthLink – Hills contract area
- Busways – Outer South contract area

The O-Bahn Busway is one of a few guided busways in the world. With large growth in the North-eastern Suburbs of Adelaide in the 1970s and 1980s, when Adelaide was faced with a transport dilemma. The Adelaide O-Bahn was constructed in 1986 in response, after beating competing proposals of expanded rail and road networks. (One of the competing proposals was to build an Adelaide underground transport system, but proved to be cost-ineffective in comparison).

Interstate bus routes to and from all the major Australian towns and cities connect to Adelaide. The main terminus for intra and interstate coach-liners is the Adelaide Central bus station on the corner of Franklin and Bowen Streets in the city-centre. Beginning in 2005, the terminal is to undergo a complete $25 million reconstruction, in conjunction with the much larger $375 million former Balfours site redevelopment – the end-product being a new multistorey bus station and various residential and commercial towers.

The Tindo ("Tindo", Kaurna word for sun) solar bus is an experimental battery electric vehicle that operates in Adelaide. It uses 100% solar power, is equipped with a regenerative braking system and air conditioning and can carry up to 40 persons, 25 of whom are seated. Hailed as the world's first bus service powered exclusively by solar power, the bus service connects Adelaide City and North Adelaide as part of Adelaide City's sustainable transport agenda. The Tindo is part of Adelaide's Free bus services, operated under the call signs, 98A and 98C (until very recently known as the Adelaide Connector bus service). Other Free services in Adelaide include the City Loop, operating under callsigns 99C and 99A, formerly known as 99C only. The 99B, the Beeline, was another free service which ran until 2007, when the Glenelg tram line extension was finally inaugurated.

97A and 97C are new services which started when the new Royal Adelaide Hospital opened. It connects the old one with the new one. Its route includes North Terrace, Currie and Grenfell Streets. The service has now ceased, due to a tram operating in the same intended purpose.

== Rail ==
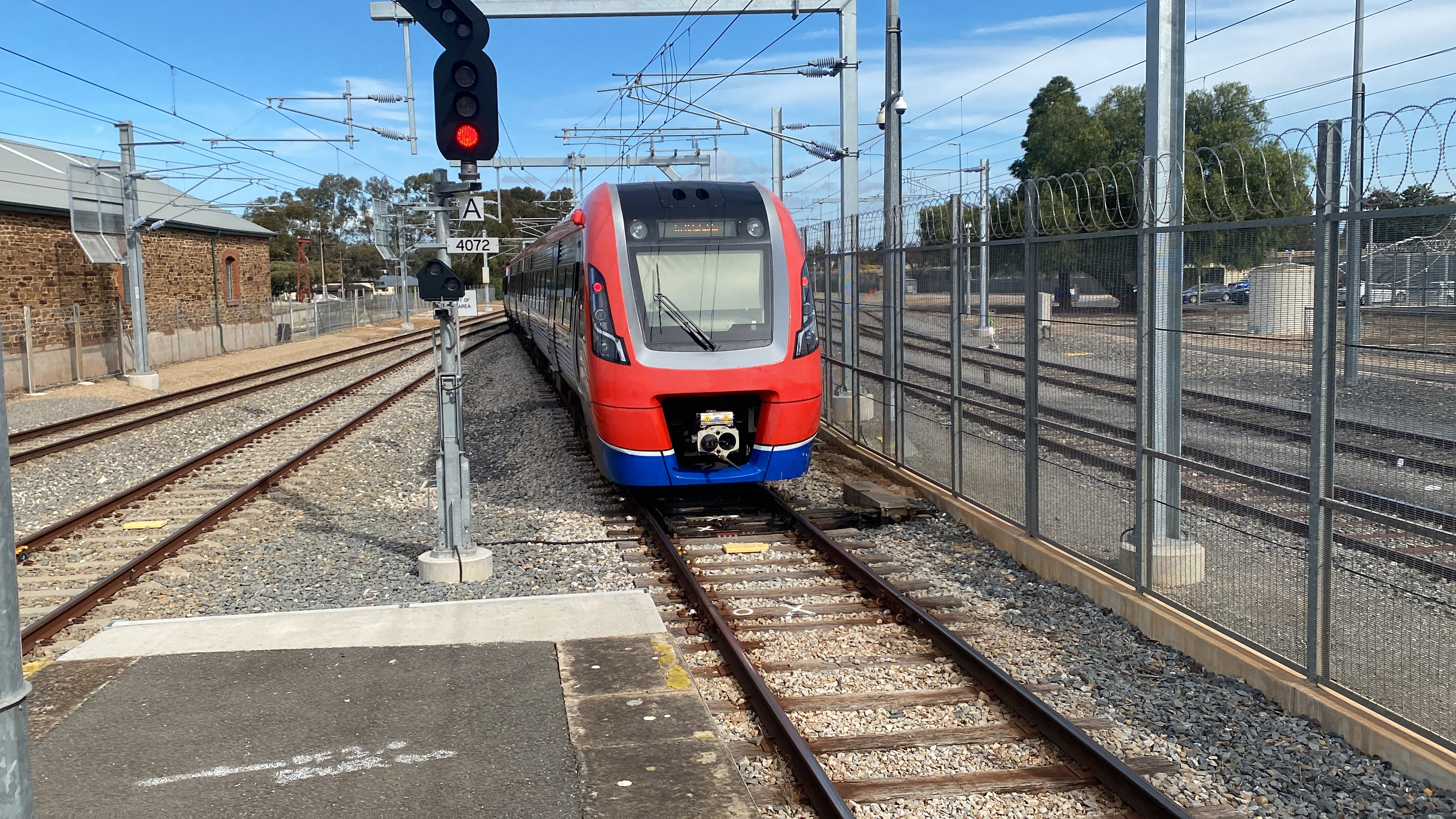
Adelaide Metro 4000 class electric train departing Gawler station in 2024.

While Adelaide's suburban passenger-rail network does not suffer the chronic delays of its inter-state counterparts, it is comparatively under-developed. Until 2014, Adelaide was the last mainland capital with a non-electric network. A 10-year $2 billion transport program commenced in 2008–09 to rebuild and electrify the network. However, only the Seaford and Tonsley lines were electrified, being completed in 2014. After being announced and cancelled multiple times, the electrification of the full Gawler line commenced in 2019. The electrified Gawler line officially opened on 12 June 2022. Adelaide is also the midpoint of the long distance Indian Pacific service between Perth and Sydney, as well as the terminus of The Overland to Melbourne and The Ghan to Alice Springs and Darwin.

In 1968, a rapid transit metro system was proposed in Adelaide underneath King William Street along with a series of freeways, however it was scrapped due to public protest about the "Americanisation" of the city. As part of the sweeping Metropolitan Adelaide Transport Study plan of 1968, the subway would have included three underground rapid train stations, including one at Hindley Street, with a shopping centre on the level between the street and the rail line.

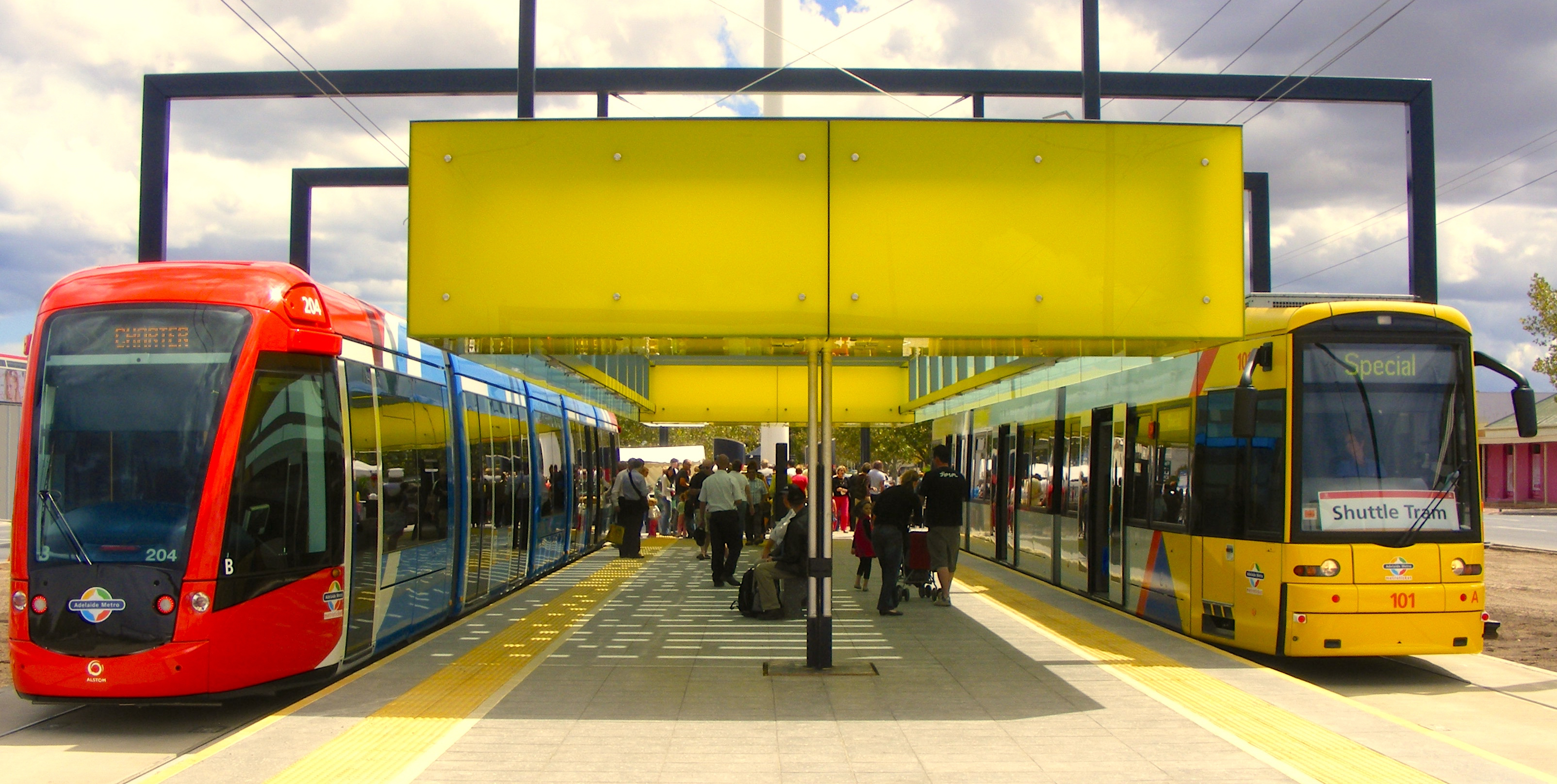
An Adelaide Metro Alstom Citadis and Flexity Classic

In late 2005, the State Government released a State Infrastructure Plan. This saw a A$56 million upgrade of the Adelaide's sole remaining tramway, from the city centre to the historic beachside resort of Glenelg. The tram line was extended from the city centre to the railway station ( and then to new terminus in the inner north-west suburb of Hindmarsh). In 2017 and 2018 a junction was created at the corner of North Terrace and King William Street with a stub track leading north to one more stop near the River Torrens and to the eastern end of North Terrace. There are now fifteen Bombardier Flexity Classic Light Rail vehicles and nine Alstom Citadis (model 302) in service.

Construction of a new junction, branch lines along the eastern end of North Terrace and King William Road and four new stops began in July/August 2017 and opened on 13 October 2018.

== Air ==
The Adelaide Airport, located near West Beach, is Australia's newest and most advanced airport terminal and is designed to serve in excess of 6.8 million passengers annually. The new dual international/domestic terminal replaced the old and ageing terminals known locally as the 'tin sheds', and incorporates new state-of-the-art features, such as glass aerobridges and the ability to cater for the new Airbus A380. The airport is designed to handle 27 aircraft simultaneously and it is capable of processing 3,000 passengers per hour. It was officially opened in a ceremony in October 2005 by Governor Marjorie Jackson-Nelson, Premier Mike Rann and Prime Minister John Howard. Due to problems with the new refuelling system, the new airport terminal was not used for interstate domestic flights until 17 February 2006.

Parafield Airport is Adelaide's second airport, mostly used for general aviation. It is located 18 kilometres north of the CBD, and was Adelaide's main airport for many years. RAAF Base Edinburgh is located 25 km north of the Adelaide CBD and is used by the military.

== Adelaide public transportation statistics ==
The average amount of time people spend commuting with public transit in Adelaide, for example to and from work, on a weekday is 65 min. 20.6% of public transit riders, ride for more than 2 hours every day. The average amount of time people wait at a stop or station for public transit is 11 min, while 13.4% of riders wait for over 20 minutes on average every day. The average distance people usually ride in a single trip with public transit is 8 km, while 15% travel for over 12 km in a single direction.

== See also ==
=== Adelaide ===
- Adelaide Metro
- Buses in Adelaide
- Railways in Adelaide
- Trams in Adelaide
- List of Adelaide railway stations
- List of public transport routes in Adelaide

=== South Australia ===
- Transport in South Australia
- Rail transport in South Australia

=== Superseded Transport Authorities ===
- Municipal Tramways Trust
- State Transport Authority
- TransAdelaide

=== Australia ===
- Transport in Australia
