= Tom Derrick =

Recipient of the Victoria Cross

Tom Derrick VC, DCM
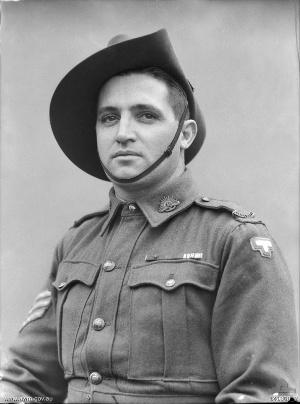
- Sergeant Tom Derrick in June 1944
- Born: 20 March 1914; Medindie, South Australia
- Died: 24 May 1945 (aged 31); Tarakan, Dutch East Indies
- Burial place: Labuan War Cemetery
- Military career
- Allegiance: Australia
- Branch: Second Australian Imperial Force
- Service years: 1940–1945
- Rank: Lieutenant
- Nickname: "Diver"
- Service number: SX7964
- Unit: 2/48th Battalion
- Conflicts: Second World War; North African Campaign; Western Desert Campaign; Siege of Tobruk; First Battle of El Alamein; Second Battle of El Alamein; Pacific War; New Guinea campaign; Salamaua-Lae campaign; Borneo Campaign; Battle of Tarakan
- Awards: Victoria Cross; Distinguished Conduct Medal

Thomas Currie "Diver" Derrick, VC, DCM (20 March 1914 – 24 May 1945) was an Australian soldier and a recipient of the Victoria Cross, the highest decoration for gallantry "in the face of the enemy" awarded to members of the British and Commonwealth armed forces. In November 1943, during the Second World War, Derrick was awarded the Victoria Cross for his assault on a heavily defended Japanese position at Sattelberg, New Guinea. During the engagement, he scaled a cliff face while under heavy fire and silenced seven machine gun posts, before leading his platoon in a charge that destroyed a further three.

Born in the Adelaide suburb of Medindie, South Australia, Derrick left school at the age of fourteen and found work in a bakery. As the Great Depression grew worse he lost his job and moved to Berri, working on a fruit farm before marrying in 1939. In July 1941, Derrick enlisted in the Second Australian Imperial Force, joining the 2/48th Battalion. He was posted to the Middle East, where he took part in the siege of Tobruk, was recommended for the Military Medal and promoted to corporal. Later, at El Alamein, Derrick was awarded the Distinguished Conduct Medal for knocking out three German machine gun posts, destroying two tanks, and capturing one hundred prisoners.

Derrick returned to Australia with his battalion in February 1943, before transferring to the South West Pacific Theatre where he fought in the battle to capture Lae. Back in Australia the following February he was posted to an officer cadet training unit, being commissioned lieutenant in November 1944. In April 1945 his battalion was sent to the Pacific island of Morotai, an assembly point for the Allied invasion of the Philippines. Engaged in action the following month on the heavily defended hill Freda on Tarakan Island, Derrick was hit by five bullets from a Japanese machine gun. He died from his wounds on 24 May 1945.

== Early life ==
Derrick was born on 20 March 1914 at the McBride Maternity Hospital in the Adelaide suburb of Medindie, South Australia, to David Derrick, a labourer from Ireland, and his Australian wife, Ada (née Whitcombe). The Derricks were poor, and Tom often walked barefoot to attend Sturt Street Public School and later Le Fevre Peninsula School. In 1928, aged fourteen, Derrick left school and found work in a bakery. By this time, he had developed a keen interest in sports, particularly cricket, Australian Rules Football, boxing and swimming; his diving in the Port River earned him the nickname of "Diver".

With the advent of the Great Depression, Derrick scraped a living from odd jobs—such as fixing bicycles and selling newspapers—to supplement his job as a baker. When in 1931, the Depression worsened, Derrick lost his bakery job and, with friends, headed by bicycle for the regional town of Berri, approximately 225 kilometres (140 mi) away, in search of work. Jobs in Berri were hard to come by and Derrick and two friends spent the next few months living in a tent on the banks of the Murray River. When the annual Royal Adelaide Show opened that year, Derrick went to the boxing pavilion to accept a challenge of staying upright for three rounds with the ex-lightweight champion of Australia. Although he was knocked down in the second round, he immediately got back to his feet and won the bet; albeit at the cost of a black eye, and a few bruised ribs.

Eventually, towards the end of 1931, Derrick found work picking fruit at a vineyard in Winkie, a short distance outside Berri. He later moved on to a full-time job at a nearby fruit farm, remaining there for the next nine years. On 24 June 1939, Derrick married Clarance Violet "Beryl" Leslie—his "one true love" whom he had met at a dance in Adelaide seven years earlier—at St Laurence's Catholic Church, North Adelaide.

== Second World War ==
Derrick did not join up when war broke out in September 1939 but, like many Australians, enlisted after the fall of France in June 1940. He joined the Second Australian Imperial Force on 5 July 1940, and was posted to the 2/48th Battalion, 26th Brigade, as a private. Derrick first joined his unit at the Wayville Showgrounds, before basic training at Woodside. Derrick thrived on military life, but found discipline difficult to accept.

In October, the 2/48th Battalion paraded through the streets of Adelaide to Mitcham railway station before its embarkation for the Middle East. The battalion's voyage overseas was postponed until 17 November, when the unit boarded the SS Stratheden. The ship made a stop at Perth, where Derrick was confined on board for going absent without leave to sightsee. He was soon in more trouble, and was charged and fined for punching another soldier who taunted him over this incident.

=== North Africa ===
On arrival in Palestine, the 2/48th Battalion encamped at El Kantara and began training in desert warfare. For relaxation, the battalion set up athletic events, and Derrick became well known for often winning cross-country races—and for organising a book on the outcomes. In March 1941, the unit went by train and truck to Alexandria, Egypt, then along the North African coast to Cyrenaica, in Libya, to join the 9th Australian Division.

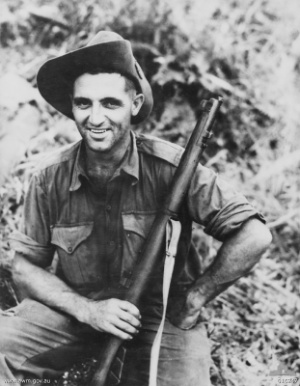
Sergeant Derrick, November 1943

After the 2/48th Battalion completed its training with the 9th Division at Cyrenaica, they were moved further along the coast to Gazala. Then, just as they began to dig in, the battalion was abruptly withdrawn to Tobruk in response to the German Afrika Korps' advance. They entered Tobruk on 9 April 1941, and spent the following eight months besieged by Axis forces. While there, Derrick acquired an Italian Breda machine gun and regularly led fighting patrols against both German and Italian troops. Although Derrick's bravery was noted during the siege, he wrote in his diary about his constant fear of dying.

On the night of 30 April, the Axis forces assaulted Tobruk's outer defences and managed to capture substantial ground. In response, the 2/48th Battalion was ordered to counter-attack the following evening. During the ensuing engagement, Derrick fought as a section member in the far left flank of the attack. After suffering heavy casualties in what Derrick described as "a bobby dazzler of a fire fight", the battalion was forced to withdraw. Praised for his leadership and bravery during the assault, Derrick was immediately promoted to corporal, and recommended for the Military Medal, but the award was never made.

In late May, Derrick discovered a German posing as a British tank officer and reported him to company headquarters; the man was immediately arrested as a spy. Following a period of heavy fighting in June, the 2/48th Battalion was placed in reserve for a few days the following month. Promoted to platoon sergeant in September, Derrick—along with the rest of his battalion—was withdrawn from Tobruk and returned to Palestine aboard HMS Kingston on 22 October. Disembarking at Tel Aviv, they were given three days' leave in the city, before returning for training.

Following a period of rest and light garrison duties in Syria, the 2/48th Battalion was rushed to El Alamein, Egypt, to reinforce the British Eighth Army. During the First Battle of El Alamein on 10 July 1942, Derrick took part in the 26th Australian Brigade's attack on Tel el Eisa. In the initial assault, Derrick, against a barrage of German grenades, led an attack against three machine gun posts and succeeded in destroying the positions before capturing over one hundred prisoners. During the Axis counter-attack that evening, the Australian line was overrun by tanks. As the German infantry following the tanks advanced, Derrick's company led a charge against the men. During the engagement, Derrick managed to destroy two German tanks using sticky bombs. Commended for his "outstanding leadership and courage", Derrick was awarded the Distinguished Conduct Medal for his part in the fighting at Tel el Eisa. The award was announced in a supplement to the London Gazette on 18 February 1943.

We could see Diver standing in the carrier, Tommy gun in hand, the top half of his body exposed. It was like a chap riding a horse into a hail of fire. You could hear the bullets splattering off the metal sides of the carrier. I thought, "God, he'll never come out of that."

— Private Joe Ratta

Promoted to sergeant on 28 July, Derrick led a six-man reconnaissance on 3 October, successfully pinpointing several German machine gun positions and strongholds; this information was to be vital for the upcoming Second Battle of El Alamein. The El Alamein offensive was launched on 23 October, the 9th Australian Division taking part. At one point during the engagement, Derrick jumped up onto an Allied gun carrier heading towards the Germans. Armed with a Thompson submachine gun and under intense heavy fire, Derrick attacked and knocked out three machine gun posts while standing in the carrier. He then had the driver reverse up to each post so he could ensure each position was silenced. By the following morning, Derrick's platoon occupied all three posts. The members of the 2/48th Battalion who witnessed Derrick's action were sure he would be awarded the Victoria Cross, though no recommendation was made.

For part of 31 October, Derrick assumed command of his company after all of the unit's officers had been killed or wounded in fierce fighting. On 21 November 1942, Derrick was briefly admitted to the 2/3rd Australian Field Ambulance with slight shrapnel wounds to his right hand and buttock. Twelve days later, the 2/48th Battalion left El Alamein and returned to Gaza in Palestine, where, later that month, Derrick attended a corps patrolling course. In January 1943, the 2/48th Battalion sailed home to Australia, aboard the SS Nieuw Amsterdam along with the rest of the 9th Division.

=== South West Pacific ===
Disembarking at Port Melbourne in late February 1943, Derrick was granted a period of leave and travelled by train to Adelaide where he spent time with Beryl. He rejoined his battalion—now encamped in the outskirts of Adelaide—before they went by train to the Atherton Tableland for training in jungle warfare. Brought up to full strength by the end of April, the 2/48th Battalion completed its training following landing-craft exercises near Cairns. On 23 July, Derrick was attached to the 21st Brigade Headquarters but admitted to hospital for old injuries to his right eye later the same day. After hospital, Derrick returned briefly to brigade headquarters before rejoining the 2/48th Battalion on 27 August.

For much of August, the 2/48th Battalion had been in training for the Allied attack on Lae, in Papua New Guinea. The unit's objective was to land on a strip of land designated as "Red Beach", and then fight their way approximately 30 kilometres (19 mi) west towards Lae. Following a bombardment by American destroyers, Derrick's wave landed on the beach with minimal casualties on 4 September. Ten days later, the 2/48th Battalion's C Company—led by Derrick's platoon—captured Malahang airstrip, before Lae fell to the Allies on 16 September. Derrick was scornful of the Japanese defence of Lae, and wrote in his diary that "our greatest problem was trying to catch up" with the retreating Japanese force.

==== Victoria Cross ====
Following Lae, the 9th Division was tasked to seize Finschhafen, clear the Huon Peninsula and gain control of the Vitiaz Strait. By 2 October, one of the division's brigades had gained a foothold on Finschhafen, but soon encountered fierce Japanese resistance. In response to a Japanese counter-attack, the 26th Brigade was transferred to reinforce the Australian position on 20 October and, when the division switched to the offensive in November, the brigade was ordered to capture Sattelberg. Sattelberg was a densely wooded hill rising 1,000 metres (1,100 yd) and dominating the Finschhafen region; it was in an assault on this position that Derrick was to earn the Victoria Cross.

First look at the ground made the task a suicide one. Jap bunkers on top could fire down on us and drop grenades down, a very sticky position indeed. Decided to give it a go using 4 and 5 sections. The move off required great courage and nerve and not a single man hesitated.

— Sergeant Tom Derrick

The Australian attack on Sattelberg began in mid-November, the Japanese slowly giving ground and withdrawing back up the precipitous slopes. Each side suffered heavy casualties, and on 20 November, Derrick—who had been acting as company sergeant major for the previous month—was given command of B Company's 11 platoon after the unit had "lost all but one of their leaders". By 22 November, the 2/23rd and 2/48th Battalions had reached the southern slopes of Sattelberg, holding a position approximately 600 metres (660 yd) from the summit. A landslide had blocked the only road, so the final assault was made by infantry alone, without supporting tanks.

On 24 November, the 2/48th Battalion's B Company was ordered to outflank a strong Japanese position sited on a cliff face, before attacking a feature 140 metres (150 yd) from the Sattelberg township. The nature of the terrain meant that the only possible route was up a slope covered with kunai grass directly beneath the cliffs. Over a period of two hours, the Australians made several attempts to clamber up the slopes to reach their objective, but each time they were repulsed by intense machine gun fire and grenade attacks. As dusk fell, it appeared impossible to reach the objective or even hold the ground already gained, and the company was ordered to withdraw. In response, Derrick replied to his company commander: "Bugger the CO [commanding officer]. Just give me twenty more minutes and we'll have this place. Tell him I'm pinned down and can't get out."

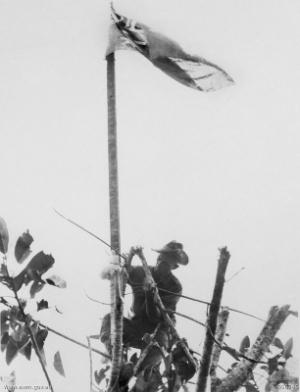
Sergeant Tom Derrick hoists the Australian flag at Sattelberg, New Guinea

Moving forward with his platoon, Derrick attacked a Japanese post that had been holding up the advance. He destroyed the position with grenades and ordered his second section around to the right flank. The section soon came under heavy machine gun and grenade fire from six Japanese posts. Clambering up the cliff face under heavy fire, Derrick held on with one hand while lobbing grenades into the weapon pits with the other, like "a man ... shooting for [a] goal at basketball". Climbing further up the cliff and in full view of the Japanese, Derrick continued to attack the posts with grenades before following up with accurate rifle fire. Within twenty minutes, he had reached the peak and cleared seven posts, while the demoralised Japanese defenders fled from their positions to the buildings of Sattelberg.

Derrick then returned to his platoon, where he gathered his first and third sections in preparation for an assault on the three remaining machine gun posts in the area. Attacking the posts, Derrick personally rushed forward on four separate occasions and threw his grenades at a range of about 7 metres (7.7 yd), before all three were silenced. Derrick's platoon held their position that night, before the 2/48th Battalion moved in to take Sattelberg unopposed the following morning. The battalion commander insisted that Derrick personally hoist the Australian flag over the town; it was raised at 10:00 on 25 November 1943.

The final assault on Sattelberg became known within the 2/48th Battalion as 'Derrick's Show'. Although he was already a celebrity within the 9th Division, the action brought him to wide public attention. On 23 March 1944, the announcement and accompanying citation for Derrick's Victoria Cross appeared in a supplement to the London Gazette. It read:

Government House, Canberra. 23rd March 1944.

The KING has been graciously pleased to approve the award of the VICTORIA CROSS to:-

Sergeant Thomas Currie Derrick, D.C.M., Australian Military Forces.

For most conspicuous courage, outstanding leadership and devotion to duty during the final assault on Sattelberg in November, 1943.

On 24th November, 1943, a company of an Australian Infantry Battalion was ordered to outflank a strong enemy position sited on a precipitous cliff-face and then to attack a feature 150 yards from the township of Sattelberg. Sergeant Derrick was in command of his platoon of the company. Due to the nature of the country, the only possible approach to the town lay through an open kunai patch situated directly beneath the top of the cliffs. Over a period of two hours many attempts were made by our troops to clamber up the slopes to their objective, but on each occasion the enemy prevented success with intense machine-gun fire and grenades.

Shortly before last light it appeared that it would be impossible to reach the objective or even to hold the ground already occupied and the company was ordered to retire. On receipt of this order, Sergeant Derrick, displaying dogged tenacity, requested one last attempt to reach the objective. His request was granted.

Moving ahead of his forward section he personally destroyed, with grenades, an enemy post which had been holding up this section. He then ordered his second section around on the right flank. This section came under heavy fire from light machine-guns and grenades from, six enemy posts. Without regard for personal safety he clambered forward well ahead of the leading men of the section and hurled grenade after grenade, so completely demoralising the enemy that they fled leaving weapons and grenades. By this action alone the company was able to gain its first foothold on the precipitous ground.

Not content with the work already done, he returned to the first section, and together with the third section of his platoon advanced to deal with the three remaining posts in the area. On four separate occasions he dashed forward and threw grenades at a range of six to eight yards until these positions were finally silenced.

In all, Sergeant Derrick had reduced ten enemy posts. From the vital ground he had captured the remainder of the Battalion moved on to capture Sattelberg the following morning.

Undoubtedly Sergeant Derrick's fine leadership and refusal to admit defeat, in the face of a seemingly impossible situation, resulted in the capture of Sattelberg. His outstanding gallantry, thoroughness and devotion to duty were an inspiration not only to his platoon and company but to the whole Battalion.

==== Later war service ====
The 2/48th Battalion remained at Sattelberg until late December 1943, when it returned to the coast to regroup. On Christmas Eve, Derrick noted in his diary that the next day would be his "4th Xmas overseas" and "I don't care where I spend the next one I only hope I'm still on deck [alive]". On 7 February 1944, the battalion sailed from Finschhafen for Australia, disembarking at Brisbane. Granted home leave, Derrick made his way to South Australia for a short period with Beryl. In April, he was admitted to hospital suffering from malaria before returning to his battalion the following month. During this time, he was charged with being absent without leave and subsequently forfeited a day's pay.

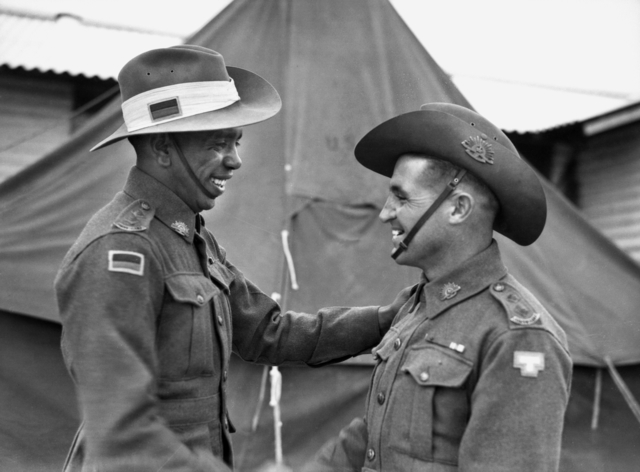
Reg Saunders and Tom Derrick congratulate each other on receiving their commissions

On 20 August 1944, Derrick was posted to an officer cadet training unit in Victoria. He requested that he be allowed to rejoin the 2/48th Battalion at the end of the course; contrary to normal Army policy that prevented officers commissioned from the ranks from returning to their previous units. An exemption was granted to Derrick only after much lobbying. While at this unit, Derrick shared a tent with Reg Saunders, who later became the Army's first Indigenous Australian officer.

Commissioned as a lieutenant on 26 November 1944, Derrick was granted twenty-four days leave. Returning to the 2/48th Battalion as a reinforcement officer, his appointment as a platoon commander in his old company was met by "great jubilation". During this period, the battalion had been posted to Ravenshoe on the Atherton Tablelands for "an extensive training period", before being transported from Cairns to Morotai during April 1945. It was around this time that Derrick converted from his Church of England religious denomination and Salvationist beliefs to Catholicism—his wife's religion—though he was not overtly religious.

On 1 May 1945, Derrick took part in the landing at Tarakan; an island off the coast of Borneo. Under the cover of a naval and aerial bombardment, he led his men ashore in the initial waves of the landing, where they were initially posted at the boundary of the 2/48th Battalion and 2/24th Battalion's area of responsibility. The Japanese force on the island mounted a determined resistance, and Derrick was later quoted in the Sunday Sun as saying he had "never struck anything so tough as the Japanese on Tarakan".

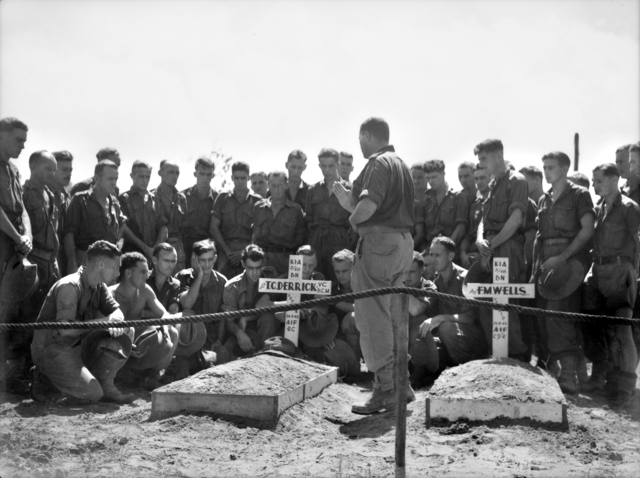
Men of the 2/48th Battalion gathered around Derrick's grave during his funeral.

Slowly pushing inland, the 2/48th Battalion's main task from 19 May was to capture a heavily defended hill code-named Freda. Derrick's platoon unsuccessfully probed Japanese positions on that day and the next, at a loss of two men killed with others wounded. He later recorded in his diary that these setbacks were a "bad show". On 21 May, Derrick and Lieutenant Colonel Bob Ainslie, the 2/48th Battalion's commander, debated the optimum size of the unit which should be used to capture the Freda position. Derrick successfully argued that a company was best, given the restrictions posed by the terrain. He was in high spirits that night, possibly in an attempt to lift his platoon's morale. On 22 May, Derrick's was one of two platoons that attacked a well-defended knoll and captured the position. Derrick played a key role in this action, and coordinated both platoons during the final assault that afternoon.

After capturing the knoll, the two platoons—reinforced by two sections of the 2/4th Commando Squadron—dug in to await an expected Japanese counter-attack. At about 03:30 on 23 May, a Japanese light machine gun fired into the Australian position. Derrick sat upright to see if his men were all right, and was hit by five bullets from the gun's second burst; striking him from his left hip to the right of his chest. His runner, "Curly" Colby, dragged him behind cover, but Derrick could not be immediately evacuated as Japanese troops attacked at about 04:00. Derrick was in great pain, and told Colby that he had "had it". Despite his wounds, he continued to issue orders for several hours. When day broke, it was discovered that Derrick's platoon were directly overlooked by a Japanese bunker—though this would not have been visible during the assault late the previous evening.

When stretcher bearers reached the position at dawn, Derrick insisted that the other wounded be attended to first. Derrick was carried off Freda later that morning, where he was met by the 26th Brigade's commander, Brigadier David Whitehead. The two men briefly conversed before Derrick excused himself, fearing that he had not much time left and wishing to see the padre. Stepping back, Whitehead saluted and sent for Father Arch Bryson. At the hospital, surgeons found that bullets had torn away much of Derrick's liver; he died on 24 May 1945 during a second operation on his wounds. He was buried in the 2/48th Battalion's cemetery on Tarakan that afternoon, and later re-interred at the Labuan War Cemetery, plot 24, row A, grave 9.

== Legacy ==
Tom Derrick was widely mourned. His widow, Beryl, became prostrate with grief on hearing of his death; many members of the Army were affected, with one soldier lamenting it felt as if "the whole war stopped". By the time Derrick's death was officially announced on 30 May, most Australians on Tarakan had heard the news and rumours had spread claiming that he had been speared or shot at short range by a sub-machine gun.

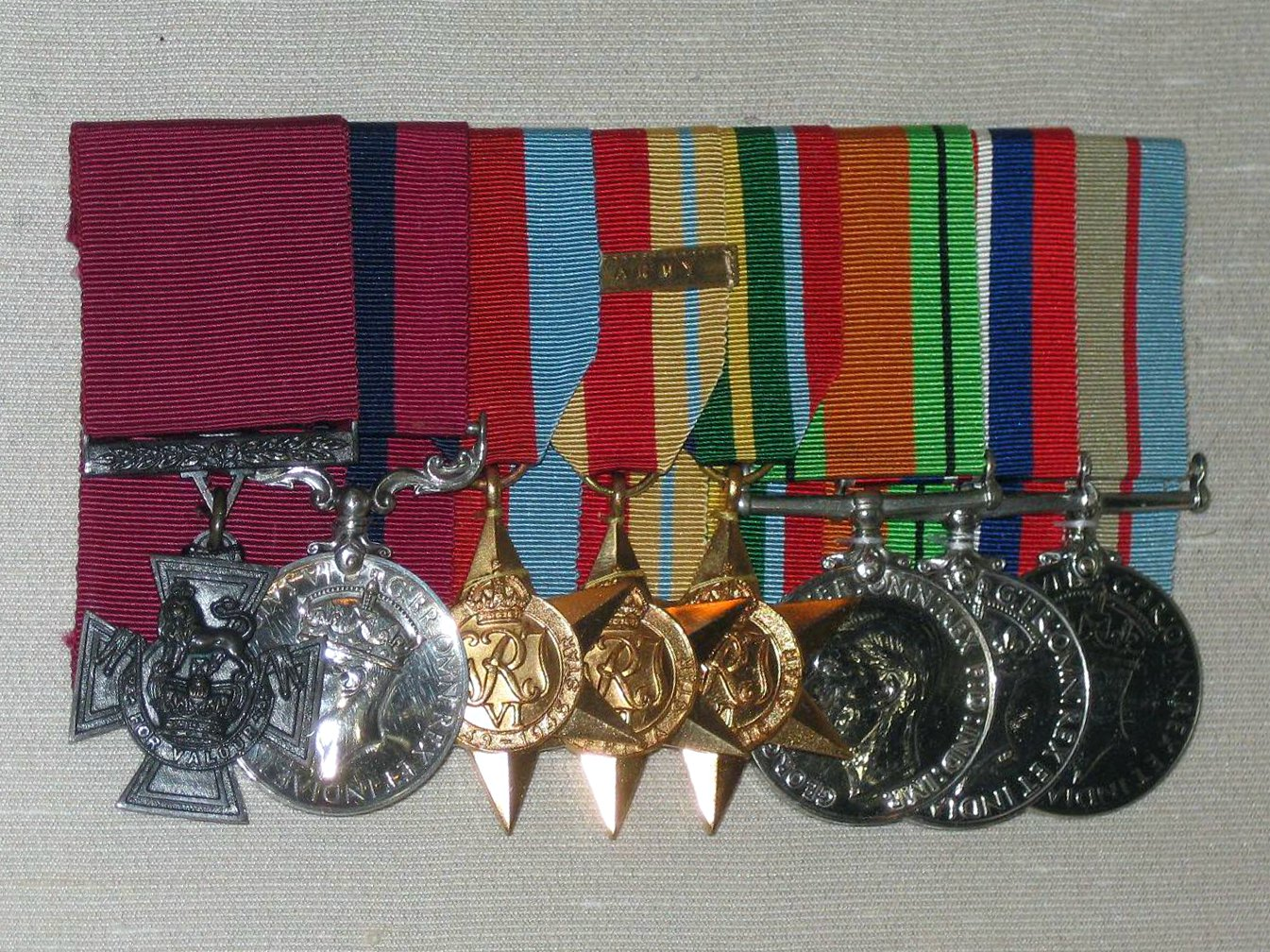
Derrick's medals on display at the Australian War Memorial

The Japanese force on Tarakan learned of Derrick's death and tried to exploit it for propaganda purposes. They printed a leaflet which began "We lament over the death of Lieutenant General Terick CinC of Allied Force in Tarakan" and later included the question "what do you think of the death in action of your Commander in Chief ...?" This leaflet reached few Australian soldiers, and had little impact on them. "Tokyo Rose" also broadcast taunts over "Terick's" death.

Derrick's reputation continued to grow after his death, and many Australian soldiers recalled any association, however slight, they had with him. To many Australians, he embodied the 'ANZAC spirit', and he remains perhaps the best-known Australian soldier of the Second World War. Historian Michael McKernan later remarked that, for his war service, Derrick had arguably deserved "a VC and two bars ... at El Alamein, at Sattelberg and now at Tarakan". In a 2004 television interview, then Chief of the Australian Defence Force, General Peter Cosgrove, was asked "Who was the best soldier of all time?" After a short pause, he replied: "Diver Derrick". This sentiment was endorsed by General Sir Francis Hassett. Hassett—who, as a lieutenant colonel, had served at Finschhafen with II Corps headquarters—stated:

From what I learnt; not only was Derrick a magnificent soldier, but also a splendid leader who, immediately he saw a tactical problem, fixed it with either personal bravery or leadership imbued with determination and common sense.

— General Sir Francis Hassett, Hassett: Australian Leader

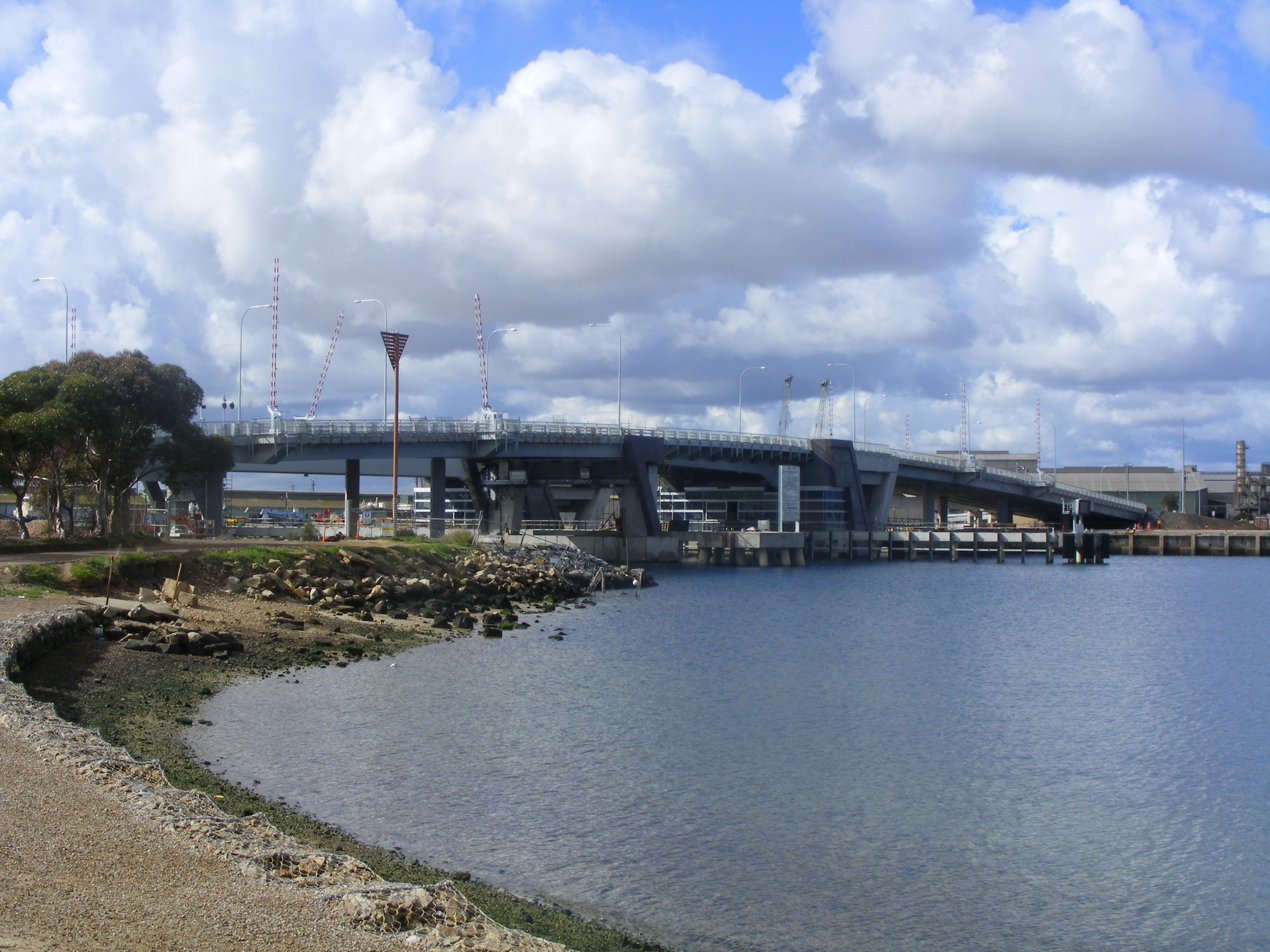
Tom 'Diver' Derrick Bridge, Port Adelaide

Derrick is also remembered for his personal qualities. He was sensitive and reflective. Despite a limited education, he was a "forceful and logical debater, with a thirst for knowledge". Derrick kept a diary, composed poetry, collected butterflies and frequently wrote to his wife, while on active service . Historian Peter Stanley has compared Derrick's leadership abilities with those of Edward 'Weary' Dunlop, Ralph Honner and Roden Cutler.

On 7 May 1947, Beryl Derrick attended an investiture ceremony at the Government House, Adelaide, where she was presented with her late husband's Victoria Cross and Distinguished Conduct Medal by the Governor of South Australia, Lieutenant General Sir Charles Norrie. Derrick's Victoria Cross and other medals are now displayed at the Australian War Memorial, Canberra, along with a portrait by Sir Ivor Hele. A street in the neighbouring suburb of Campbell and a rest stop in the Remembrance Driveway between Sydney and Canberra were also named in his honour. In 1995, a public park was named the Derrick Memorial Reserve on Carlisle St, Glanville in his honour, and his VC citation is displayed on a plaque there. In June 2008, a newly built bridge over the Port River on the Port River Expressway was named the Tom 'Diver' Derrick Bridge following a public campaign.
