= Tom 'Diver' Derrick Bridge =

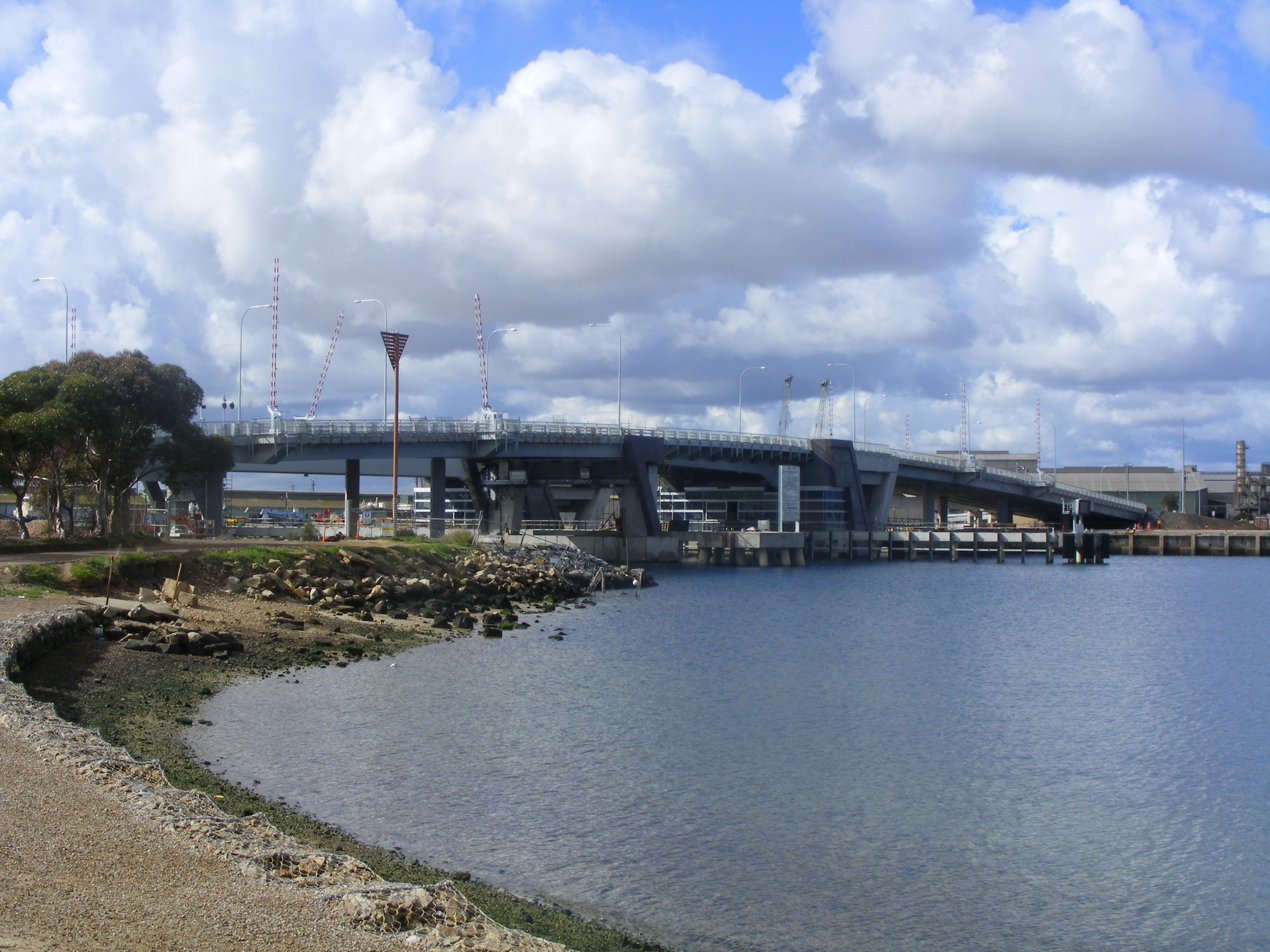
- Coordinates: 34°50′18″S 138°30′25″E
- Carries: Port River Expressway
- Crosses: Port River
- Locale: Lefevre Peninsula
- Named for: Tom Derrick
- Owner: Department of Planning, Transport & Infrastructure
- Preceded by: Mary MacKillop Bridge
- Followed by: Birkenhead Bridge

Characteristics
- Design: Single-leaf bascule bridge
- Total length: 303 metres (994 ft)
- Height: 10 metres (33 ft)
- No. of lanes: 4

History
- Constructed by: Abigroup
- Opened: 1 August 2008

Location
- Interactive map of Tom 'Diver' Derrick Bridge

The Tom 'Diver' Derrick Bridge, commonly referred to as the 'Diver' Derrick Bridge, is an opening single-leaf bascule road bridge over the Port River, Port Adelaide, in South Australia. It opened on 1 August 2008. It is located between Docks 1 and 2 at Port Adelaide and links to Francis Street to the east and Victoria Road to the west.

The bridge was the subject of a successful community campaign, spearheaded by the local Semaphore & Port Adelaide RSL Sub-Branch and the Portside Messenger newspaper, to name it after Port Adelaide World War II hero, Tom 'Diver' Derrick instead of the State Government's unpopular choice of the Power Bridge.

== History ==
For years, debate raged in Port Adelaide about the need for a third crossing over the Port River, in addition to the existing Birkenhead and Jervois bridges. Ideas for the crossing included an under-river tunnel, closed bridge, causeway and opening bridge. In the early 2000s the State Government announced the Port River Expressway project, a highway linking Port Adelaide to Adelaide's northern suburbs. The project included a closed bridge across the Port River. However the Port Adelaide community were concerned a closed bridge would cut-off the Port River and block larger boats from accessing the port's inner harbour. After a strong community campaign, the State Government agreed to build a high-level single-leaf bascule opening bridge. Abigroup was awarded the tender to build the bridge in 2005 and construction began the following year. It opened on 1 August 2008.

== Name ==
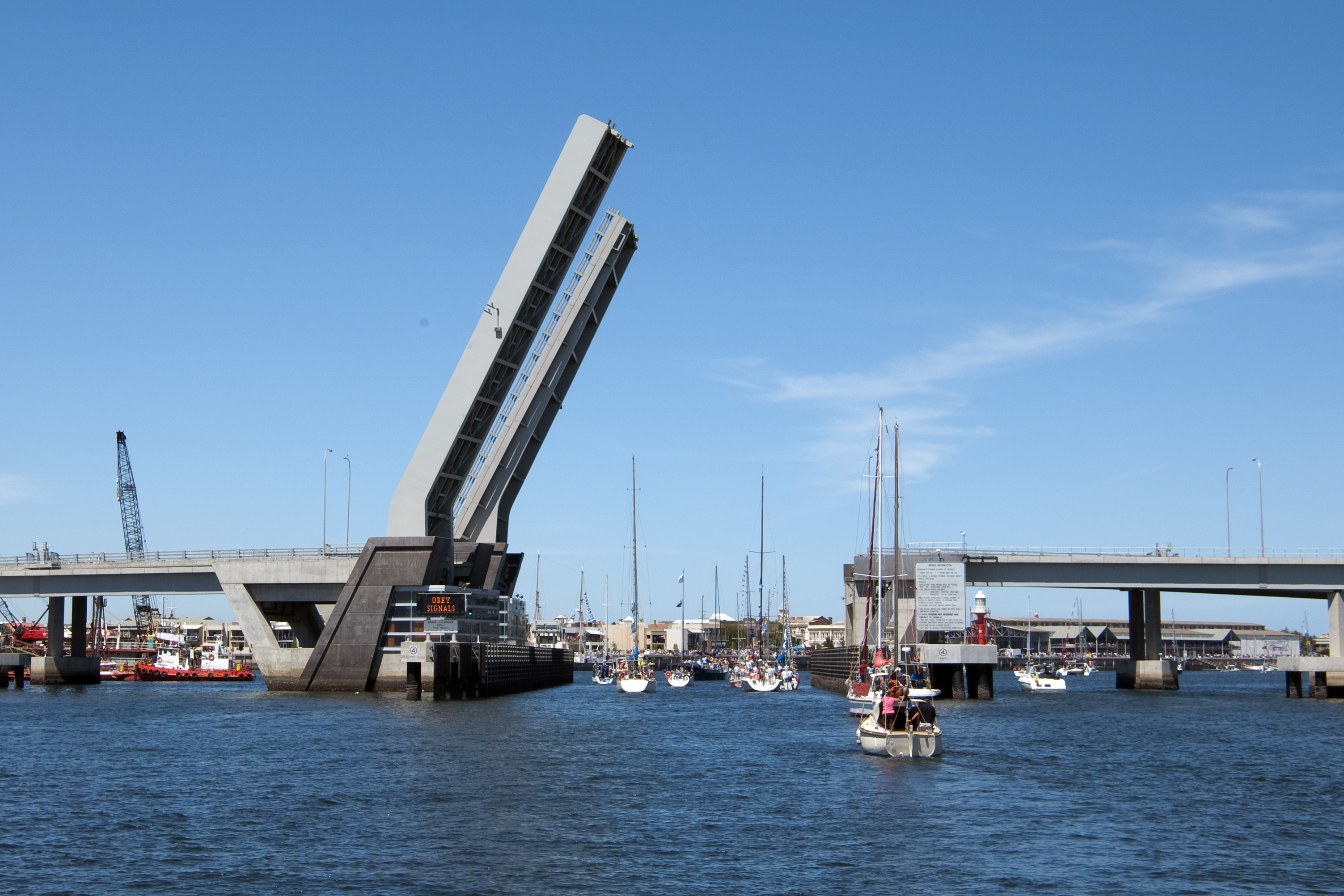
Tom 'Diver' Derrick Bridge with the Mary MacKillop Bridge in the foreground

Both road and rail bridges were originally referred to as the PRExy Bridges, short for Port River Expressway. In 2004, South Australian Premier Mike Rann announced the road crossing would be named the 'Power Bridge' after the Port Adelaide Football Club.

Later in 2005, it was suggested the bridge be named after Derrick. This idea gradually garnered grassroots support in Port Adelaide. In May 2008, the Portside Messenger collected a 3,500 signature petition in support of the Derrick name. Port Adelaide-Enfield Council also unanimously supported naming the bridge after Derrick. On 5 June 2008, the State Government announced it had changed its mind and would name the bridge after Derrick.
