= Metropolitan Adelaide Transport Study =

Abandoned transport scheme for the city of Adelaide

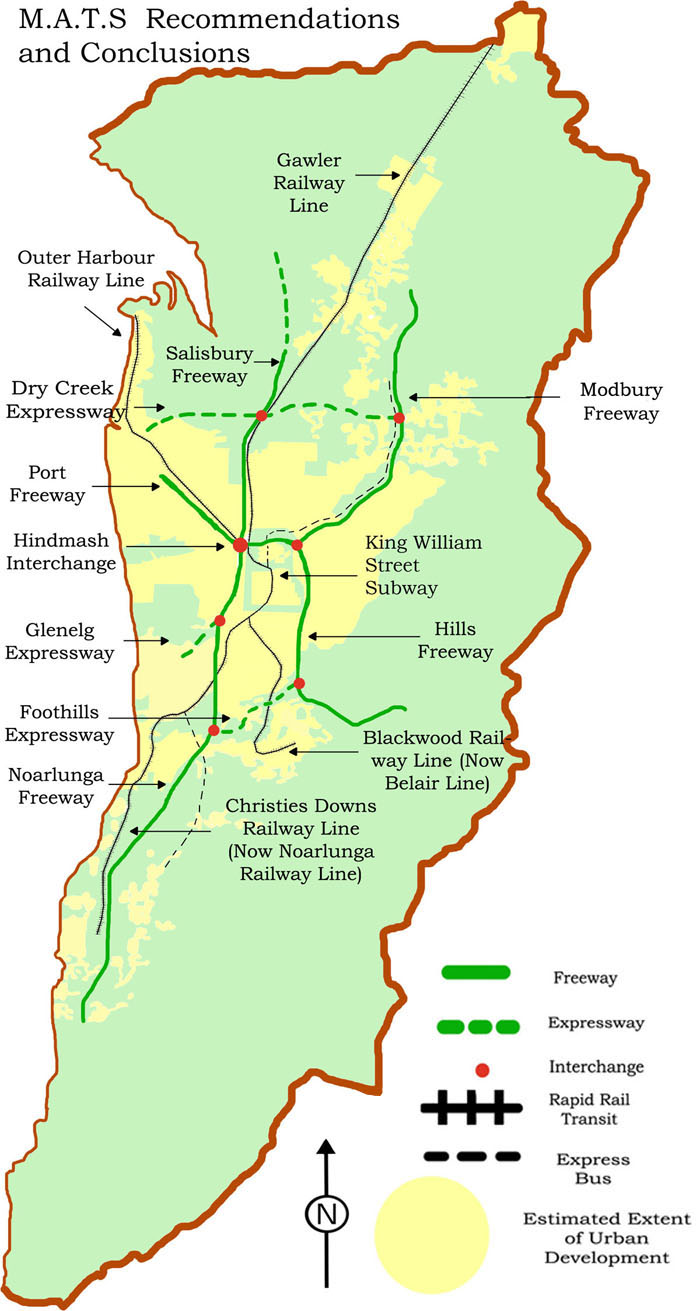
Transport corridors recommended by the MATS

The Metropolitan Adelaide Transport Study, or "MATS Plan" as it became known, was a comprehensive transport plan released in 1968 proposing a number of road and rail transport projects for the metropolitan area of Adelaide, South Australia.

It recommended the construction of 98 kilometres (61 miles) of freeways, 34 kilometres (21 miles) of expressway and the widening of 386 kilometres (240 miles) of existing arterial roads. It also featured new arterial roads and a new bridge over the Port River. For public transport, it proposed the closure of the Glenelg tram line, 20 rail grade separations and 14 kilometres (8.7 miles) of new railway line, including a subway under King William Street.

The estimated cost of land acquisition and construction was A$436.5 million in 1968 (equivalent to $6.07 billion in 2022). Most of the plan's recommendations were ultimately not brought to fruition in their original form due to political and public opposition. However, the North–South Freeway proposed by MATS closely resembles the North–South Motorway, whose final section, the Torrens to Darlington (T2D) project, is under construction and due for completion by 2031.

== History ==
Like other states of Australia, there was a strong movement towards private car travel following World War II in South Australia. Fuel rationing was a thing of the past and private car ownership was increasing. The car was seen as a personal liberator, and many cities around the world were building their urban forms around the needs of private cars.

Adelaide continued to expand rapidly: by 1966 its population had increased by 90% on post-war levels. Experts had been warning of the consequences of unplanned urban sprawl leading to a renewed interest in planning. In 1955 the Town Planning Act was amended to require a coordinated plan for the city's future development.

The Report on the Metropolitan Area of Adelaide was released in 1962 and featured proposals for the construction of freeways. In December 1964 the state Liberal and Country League government led by Premier Thomas Playford commissioned a two-year infrastructure planning study of Adelaide's transport needs, to be designed and conducted by consultants from the United States. The report of this study, titled the Metropolitan Adelaide Transportation Study (MATS), was released by Premier Steele Hall on 12 August 1968. Hall told Parliament that the report would be discussed in the community and that the government would decide after six months whether to accept it in whole or in part.

== Recommended freeways ==
=== North–South Freeway ===
The North–South Freeway was one of the most important parts of the plan, allowing travel north and south of Adelaide. The Report on the Metropolitan Area of Adelaide predicted that the city would eventually stretch more than 70 km, from Elizabeth in the north to Sellicks Beach in the south by the 1980s.

Travel from Salisbury to Noarlunga was estimated to take approximately 30 minutes. The freeway consisted of two sections: the Noarlunga Freeway and the Salisbury Freeway. The Noarlunga freeway would serve the rapidly growing residential, industrial and recreational areas to the south of Adelaide, connecting to major highways to Victor Harbor and Yankalilla.

Starting at Old Noarlunga, it was to follow a path adjacent to Main South Road (this has since been completed and is known as the Southern Expressway), then continuing north on a path roughly parallel to South Road then land near the west parkland with off ramps to the CBD, until joining the North Adelaide Connector. An interchange north of the Anzac Highway would connect it to the proposed Glenelg Expressway, which was to run to Glenelg along the reservation of the former North Terrace–Glenelg railway.

The Salisbury Freeway was the six-lane continuation of the Noarlunga Freeway starting at the Hindmarsh Interchange then roughly followed the west of the Gawler railway line through Wingfield and north to Edinburgh. The Noarlunga Freeway was proposed to be eight lanes, cost $34 million in land acquisition, $58 million in construction and carry 93,000 cars on an average weekday by 1986.

=== Port Freeway ===
This was to be a freeway constructed in the wide median strip of Port Road that had been left in earlier years for a possible canal leading from Port Adelaide to the Adelaide city centre. It was to go from the Hindmarsh Interchange to the Old Port Road intersection. It would feature pedestrian overpasses but was still criticised for blocking communications across Port Road. Following Port Road, Commercial Road was to continue over a new bridge over the Port River connecting to Victoria Road making a continuous arterial road.

=== Hindmarsh Interchange ===
The largest construction project in the plan. The intersection of the Port Freeway, North-South Freeway and North Adelaide Connector would have required a four-level spaghetti interchange with many flyovers that would have almost engulfed the suburb of Hindmarsh. After the plan was released, the House of Assembly member for Hindmarsh, Cyril Hutchens, told Parliament that a large part of Hindmarsh municipality would cease to exist and that its council would lose so much rate revenue that boundaries would need to be redrawn for it to survive. When approving the plan in 1969, the government undertook to investigate council boundaries in relation to Hindmarsh, Thebarton, and Walkerville. Pictures of similar sized interchanges in Los Angeles were used to good effect by opponents of MATS. There were four different designs proposed including one that was to be sited in the parklands, reducing the need for land acquisition.

=== North Adelaide Connector ===
This was to connect the western and eastern sides of the city starting from the Hindmarsh Interchange and connecting to the Modbury Freeway. It would have been constructed through parkland and travel partially underground to reduce the loss of open space.

Arterial road projects have since taken place in the area, particularly on roads lining the parklands including Park Terrace, Fitzroy Terrace and Park Road. Overpasses were constructed to carry Park Terrace over the Gawler railway line in 1990 and the Outer Harbor railway line in 2017.

The Hawker Street tram bridge over the Gawler railway line was demolished in the 1970s due to lack of maintenance and safety concerns. An overpass over the Gawler railway line at Torrens Road was proposed but a report on the Torrens Road upgrade in 2005 stated grade separation was no longer a priority. A Torrens Road bridge over the Gawler railway line was constructed in 2021–2022 and allowed traffic from 18 June 2022, eliminating the level crossing.

=== Hills Freeway ===
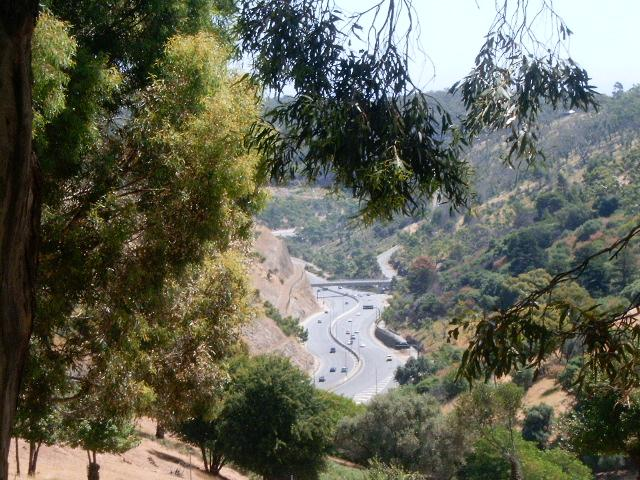
The Mount Osmond Interchange on the South Eastern Freeway

This was proposed to be a connection between the new South Eastern Freeway (then under construction from Crafers, leaving the winding old road down to the plains) and the CBD. It would have cut a swathe through College Park, St Peters, Norwood, Rose Park, Myrtle Bank and Urrbrae before leaving the city at Belair Road. Many of Adelaide's most affluent suburbs would have been broken up. This proved to be the most controversial part of the entire MATS plan. It was dropped from subsequent proposals but served to turn public opinion against the rest of the project.

=== Foothills Expressway ===
A proposed link between the North-South Freeway at Darlington (approximately the point where South Road meets Sturt Road) travelling in a north-east direction to meet up with the Hills Freeway at Belair Road. The expressway was scrapped from subsequent proposals with the Hills Freeway.

=== Modbury Freeway ===
Starting at the North Adelaide Connector, this would have followed the River Torrens (the O-Bahn Busway was later constructed in this corridor instead). At approximately 1 km from the O-Bahn's current terminus in Modbury, it would have then turned further north along what is now McIntyre Road through Golden Grove.

An express bus service along the freeway giving a similar service to the current O-Bahn was proposed. The freeway would have required the relocation of the River Torrens in various sections.

=== Dry Creek Expressway ===
Starting at Port Adelaide, this would have been an east–west connector running roughly parallel to and slightly north of Grand Junction Road and terminating at the Modbury Freeway. The western section from Port Adelaide to Salisbury Highway at Wingfield has since been completed as the Port River Expressway. However it has not been extended eastward, the original corridor now utilised as Montague Road.

Attributes
	Noarlunga Freeway	Hindmarsh Interchange	North Adelaide Connector	Port Freeway	Salisbury Freeway	Hills Freeway	Modbury Freeway
Cost, land acquisition	34,000,000	16,700,000	5,700,000	100,000	9,800,000	20,000,000	7,400,000
Cost, construction	58,000,000	13,000,000	11,500,000	15,100,000	14,000,000	32,000,000	42,500,000
Cost, total	92,000,000	29,700,000	17,200,000	15,200,000	23,800,000	52,000,000	49,900,000
Estimated cars weekday, 1986	93,000	N/A	62,000	68,000	62,000	58,500	79,000
Length, kilometres	34.4	2.6	3.2	3.3	12.7	2.9	21.2
Lanes	8	N/A	6	6	6	6	8

== Public transport changes ==
There were various changes to public transport proposed. While the report stated that it was important in directing and shaping urban growth and improving the Adelaide city centre, only 14 kilometres of new railway was proposed compared to 131 kilometres of freeway. The only remaining part of the Adelaide tram network, the Glenelg tram, was also to be removed in favour of an expressway.

=== Train ===
The existing rail system was to be turned into a rapid rail network which would be aimed at providing efficient long distance, high speed suburban transport. Many railway stations were to be rationalised and some would be relocated to link to main roads. Closure of some stations allowed higher running speeds of trains and reduced running and maintenance costs.

Locating stations closer to main roads made them more accessible and visible. Railway stations would be supported by feeder bus services thereby increasing their serviceable range. Competing bus services were to be removed. A distance of 3.2 kilometres between railway stations was said to be optimal.

The Noarlunga rail line, which then only went as far as Hallett Cove, was to be extended to Christie Downs.

==== King William Street subway ====
The most significant proposed public transport project was an underground railway beneath the city to bring rail to the core of the CBD. It was to link the main north–south Gawler and Noarlunga lines with a new arrangement of through-stations. This would have eliminated the limitations in service-frequency in railways with a central terminus. After skirting underground to the north of the Adelaide railway station, the subway was to proceed under the central King William Street and serve it with three stations, before returning to the surface just south of Greenhill Road where it is crossed by the current Glenelg tram line. The envisioned closure of the latter would have allowed its corridor to be used by the new railway instead, until Glandore, although options to accommodate four tracks and both services in this section of corridor could have existed. From Glandore, the new railway would have rejoined the existing Noarlunga Line at Edwardstown via an approximately 1,200m-long new railway corridor running parallel to South Road and about 200m to its west.

Apart from the direct public transport benefits, it was said the subway would also lead to increased land values and encourage development at the southern end of the city. The Toronto Yonge Street subway was used as an example. Furthermore, the heritage Adelaide railway station and much of the Adelaide rail yards would have become available for value capture property development.

The subway was estimated to cost $32.8 million. Construction costs were to be reduced by using a cut and cover construction technique involving the temporary removal of King William Street.

=== Tram ===
The report recommended the closure of the Glenelg tram line and its replacement with the Glenelg Expressway. The report stated that significant investment would be required to integrate the tram line with the proposed new rapid transit rail system and to construct grade separations along existing roads. Based on those assumptions, it recommended that the continued operation of the tram would not be cost-effective.

It was predicted that overall public transport usage would fall to below 5% by around the year 2000, and proceeding with the recommended changes would maintain the number at 7%.

== Reaction and opposition ==
The Report on the Metropolitan Area of Adelaide 1962 had contained images of the city of Los Angeles, and its extensive freeways, to represent a potential model for Adelaide's future transport provision. However, in concert with changing community attitudes in Australia in the late 1960s, many South Australians were cautious about the MATS proposal for the construction of a large freeway network. Opposition was similar to the freeway and expressway revolts experienced in the United States.

Large-scale property acquisition proved to be one of the most contentious issues, with the very large areas taken up by a number of the proposed freeway interchanges seemingly recommended without any expectation of opposition. The Noarlunga Freeway alone would have required the acquisition as many as 3,000 properties, including 817 residential dwellings. The Hills Freeway would have seen the demolition of significant areas in the historic suburbs of inner south-eastern Adelaide.

Opponents also presented petitions to Parliament. In September 1968, a petition signed by 5,679 electors was presented to the House of Assembly opposing the Noarlunga Freeway and the rerouting of the railway between Goodwood and Edwardstown. The petition described the resulting property acquisition as an unwarranted intrusion on the peaceful life of the residents and asked the government to reject both proposals. In February 1969, residents of St Peters and College Park presented petitions to the Legislative Council, objecting that the plan would bring no traffic benefits, would displace many residents from their homes and would cost more than alternative schemes; that the Hills Freeway would bisect College Park and the Modbury Freeway would spoil a section of the river; and that newly built homes would be acquired.

The impact of freeways on the urban landscape also proved to be a considerable source of concern. It was feared freeways would create social problems, with people noting the urban divisions that cities such as Los Angeles experienced after extensive freeway construction, with the separation of neighbourhoods leading to the creation of urban ghettos. It was felt that the same would happen in Adelaide if the proposed freeways were constructed.

== Implementation ==
On 19 February 1969 Murray Hill, the Minister of Roads and Transport in the Steele Hall Liberal and Country League government, announced that the MATS Plan proposals for public transport, arterial roads, and freeways and expressways had been approved as a master plan, excluding some proposals which were to be further reviewed.

The deferred items included:

- closure of the Grange railway line and of Womma railway station
- the Foothills Expressway and the Hills Freeway
- sections of the Modbury and Noarlunga Freeways and the Dry Creek Expressway
- diversion of the southern railway line between Edwardstown and Goodwood
- 18 arterial road proposals
- all of the report's proposals for raising revenue for roadworks

The King William Street subway was approved subject to further feasibility studies of its financial and engineering aspects, and the government asked for further recommendations from the Joint Steering Committee within six months.

=== Abandonment ===
In 1970 a new Labor government under Don Dunstan was elected and shelved MATS, but did not go as far as selling the corridors already acquired. However, the Adelaide Festival Centre was developed over the optimal portal location for the proposed King William Street subway. Dunstan resisted urban sprawl, but initiated the ill-fated concept of the Monarto satellite city, as well as investigating new technologies in public transport. Dunstan attempted to construct a light rail line in the north-east along the Modbury corridor. That was not built, and the O-Bahn guided busway was constructed instead.

In 1979, the Liberal Party under David Tonkin won the election and formed a government. In February 1982, the Minister of Transport Michael Wilson told Parliament that the uncertainty arising from a moratorium on freeway development in the north–south corridor had caused planning blight, and that the planned corridor's existence had obliged the Highways Department to buy many properties on hardship and owner-approach bases, tying up money that could otherwise have been spent on roads. He abandoned the idea of a high-speed freeway and announced that the 40-kilometre (25 mi) tract of land reserved for it between Dry Creek and Noarlunga would be halved in width and truncated south of Darlington. The section from Reynella to Darlington would be reserved for a possible northward extension of a planned Morphett Vale bypass, while the section from Darlington to Dry Creek would be retained as a concept pending consideration of a narrower road. Surplus land on the corridor was to be sold immediately, and widening South Road between Daws Road and Torrens Road became an urgent priority.

In June 1983, the North-South Corridor, the last surviving element of MATS, was abandoned by John Bannon's new Labor government and removed from the development plan. The decision was reported to have had a significant impact on the Highways Department, because it was the first time in its history that a government had rejected the recommendations of the Commissioner of Highways.

== Post-abandonment assessment ==
Attitudes towards MATS in the present day are mixed. Steele Hall, the premier when the plan was released, later said Adelaide's hopes for a transport vision had been lost with the scrapping of MATS, and described later projects such as underpasses on South Road as a "piecemeal approach". Freight transport and motoring lobbies generally favoured the plan and have periodically referred to its rejection as a lost opportunity. In 2007 the state government ran a campaign with road and freight lobby groups, including the RAA, for federal funding of the north–south corridor. It secured commitments from both the federal Liberal government and the Labor opposition.

Public transport activists criticised the plan due to its limited benefits for public transport and the potential effects on urban sprawl. Others believe varying degrees of the plan were too ruthless towards the environment and would have ruined the character of Adelaide.

=== Present-day ===
Several roads constructed since MATS follow parts of its proposed corridors. The Southern Expressway, constructed between 1995 and 2001, partly follows the reservation for the southern section of the proposed Noarlunga Freeway. The South Eastern Freeway, on which early construction had started before MATS was released, was completed in 1979 from Crafers to Murray Bridge with the final link from Crafers to Adelaide constructed from 1996 to 2000. The Port River Expressway was opened in 2005 and partially follows the proposed Dry Creek Expressway but does not extend eastwards to Modbury.

In 2005, the Rann Labor government announced a plan to upgrade South Road into a continuous non-stop north–south route between the Southern Expressway and the Port River Expressway, a distance of 22 kilometres (14 mi). It declined a $1 billion pre-election funding offer from the Howard federal government in 2007 which would have upgraded substantial sections of the road. Instead, construction of an underpass at the intersection of South Road and the Anzac Highway was completed in 2009. Most of the route of the North–South Freeway proposed by MATS has since been followed by the non-stop North–South Motorway. As of 2026 its final section, the Torrens to Darlington (T2D) project, is under construction and is expected to be completed by 2031.

== See also ==
- Transport in Adelaide
- State Transport Authority
- Railways in Adelaide
- Freeways in Australia
- South Eastern Freeway
- South Road
- History of Adelaide

Melbourne:

- 1969 Melbourne Transportation Plan

Hobart:

- Hobart Area Transportation Study

== Bibliography ==
- De Leuw. Cather & Company. Rankine & Hill Alan M. Voorhees & Associates, 1968, Metropolitan Adelaide Transport Study 1968, Adelaide
- The University of Adelaide Department of Adult Education, the Metropolitan Adelaide Transportation Study and the Future Development of Adelaide, 1968, Adelaide
- Thomas Wilson, The Relationship Between a Transport Link and Land Use Development between Adelaide and Port Adelaide South Australia, Adelaide
- J.C. Radcliff. C.J.M. Steele, Adelaide Road Passenger Transport 1836–1958, Libraries Board of South Australia, Adelaide, 1974
