= Salisbury Highway =

Highway in Adelaide

Salisbury Highway John Rice Avenue South Australia
- Coordinates: 34.832756°S 138.562418°E (southwest end); 34.746558°S 138.676511°E (northeast end)

General information
- Type: Highway
- Location: Adelaide
- Length: 15.2 km (9.4 mi)
- Route number(s): A9 (2017–present)
- Former route number: National Highway A13 (1998–2017) (Wingfield–Dry Creek); A13 (1998–2017) (Dry Creek–Elizabeth Vale)

Major junctions
- southwest end: Port River Expressway; Wingfield, Adelaide
- North-South Motorway; Port Wakefield Road
- northeast end: Main North Road; Elizabeth Vale, Adelaide

Location(s)
- Region: Western Adelaide, Northern Adelaide
- Major suburbs: Dry Creek, Mawson Lakes, Parafield Gardens, Salisbury

Highway system
- Highways in Australia; National Highway • Freeways in Australia; Highways in South Australia

Salisbury Highway (and its northern section as John Rice Avenue) is a 15 kilometre major connecting road in the northern suburbs of the Adelaide metropolitan area. It is designated part of route A9.

== Route ==
Salisbury Highway starts at the interchange with the North-South Motorway in Wingfield and heads east as a four-lane, dual-carriageway road and then north-east through the north-eastern suburbs of Adelaide, runs parallel to Main North Road from Mawson Lakes through Salisbury where it intersects with Commercial Road, changing name to John Rice Avenue and narrowing to a four-lane, single-carriageway road. It continues a short distance east to terminate with Main North Road in Elizabeth Vale.

== History ==
Until the early 1990s, Salisbury Highway terminated at Port Wakefield Road. The Salisbury Highway Extension project built the bridge and interchange at Port Wakefield Road, and extended the highway to Wingfield, where it joined the north end of what was then the South Road Interconnector. Neither the Port River Expressway nor the North–South Motorway had been built at that time.

Salisbury Highway (and John Rice Avenue) was originally designated as part of route A13 when South Australia switched to the alpha-numeric road route system in 1998 (with Salisbury Highway between Port River Expressway and Port Wakefield Road was shown as part of National Highway A13 on local road signage and major street directory publications); it was replaced by route A9 in 2017.

== Major intersections ==
LGA	Location	km	mi	Destinations	Notes
Port Adelaide Enfield	Dry Creek–Wingfield boundary	0.0	0.0	Port River Expressway (A9) – Port Adelaide	Western terminus of Salisbury Highway, route A9 continues west along Port River Expressway
Port Adelaide Enfield	Dry Creek–Wingfield boundary	0.0	0.0	North–South Motorway (M2) – Waterloo Corner, Regency Park, Hindmarsh; South Road – Wingfield	
Salisbury	Dry Creek–Mawson Lakes boundary	4.6	2.9	Port Wakefield Road – Port Wakefield, Waterloo Corner, Gepps Cross	
Dry Creek		5.1	3.2	Bridge over the river (bridge name unknown)	
Salisbury	Mawson Lakes	5.9	3.7	Elder Smith Road – Mawson Lakes	
Salisbury	Salisbury Downs–Parafield Gardens boundary	9.0	5.6	Kings Road – Paralowie, Parafield, Para Hills	
Salisbury	Salisbury	11.2	7.0	Park Terrace (east) – Salisbury; Waterloo Corner Road (northwest) – Burton	
Salisbury	Salisbury	11.6	7.2	Gawler and Adelaide–Port Augusta SG railway lines	
Little Para River		11.8	7.3	Bridge over the river (bridge name unknown)	
Salisbury–Playford boundary	Salisbury–Elizabeth South boundary	12.5	7.8	Commercial Road – Edinburgh, Salisbury	Name change: Salisbury Highway (southwest), John Rice Avenue (northeast)
Playford	Elizabeth South–Elizabeth Vale boundary	13.4	8.3	Philip Highway – Elizabeth	
Playford	Elizabeth Vale	15.2	9.4	Main North Road – Gawler, Elizabeth, Gepps Cross, North Adelaide	Northeastern terminus of John Rice Avenue and route A9
Incomplete access; Route transition

== Gallery ==
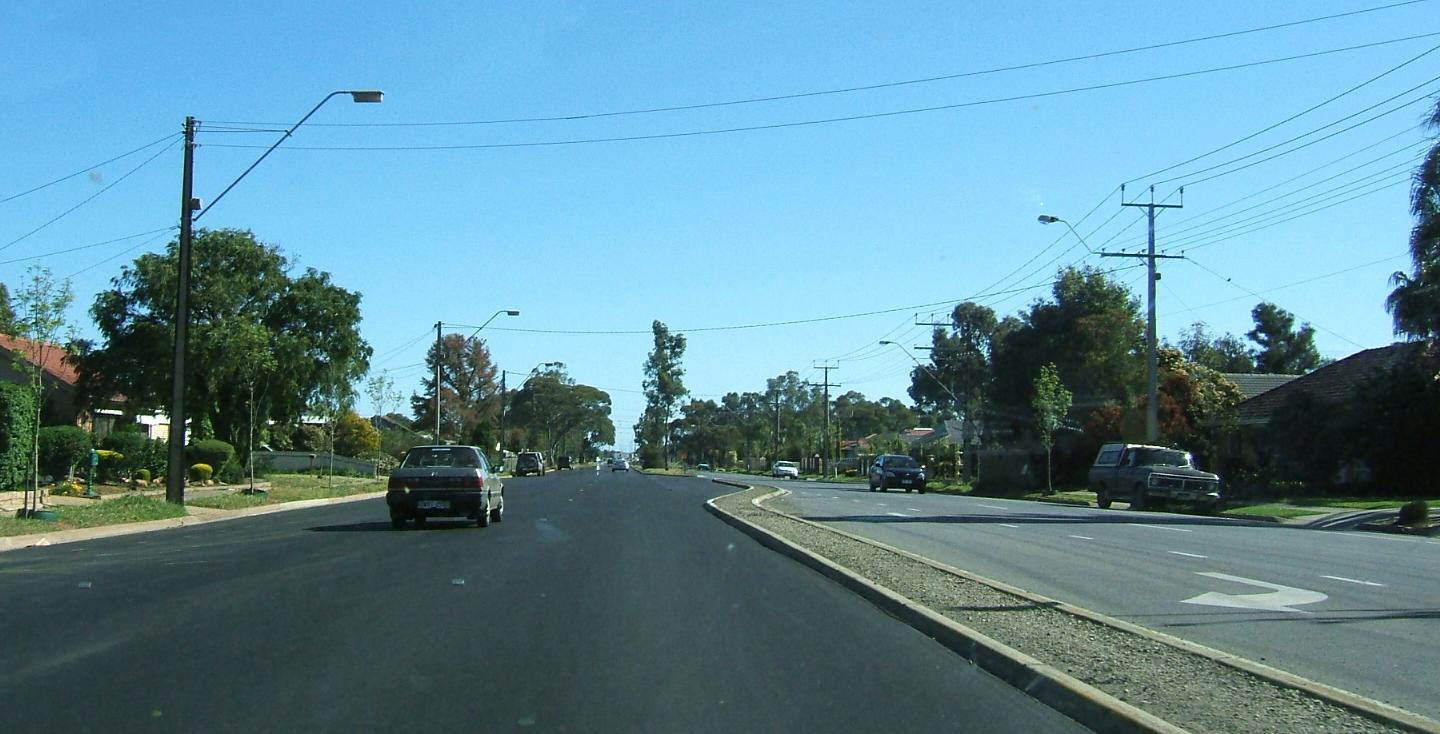
Salisbury Highway, looking southwards at Parafield Gardens

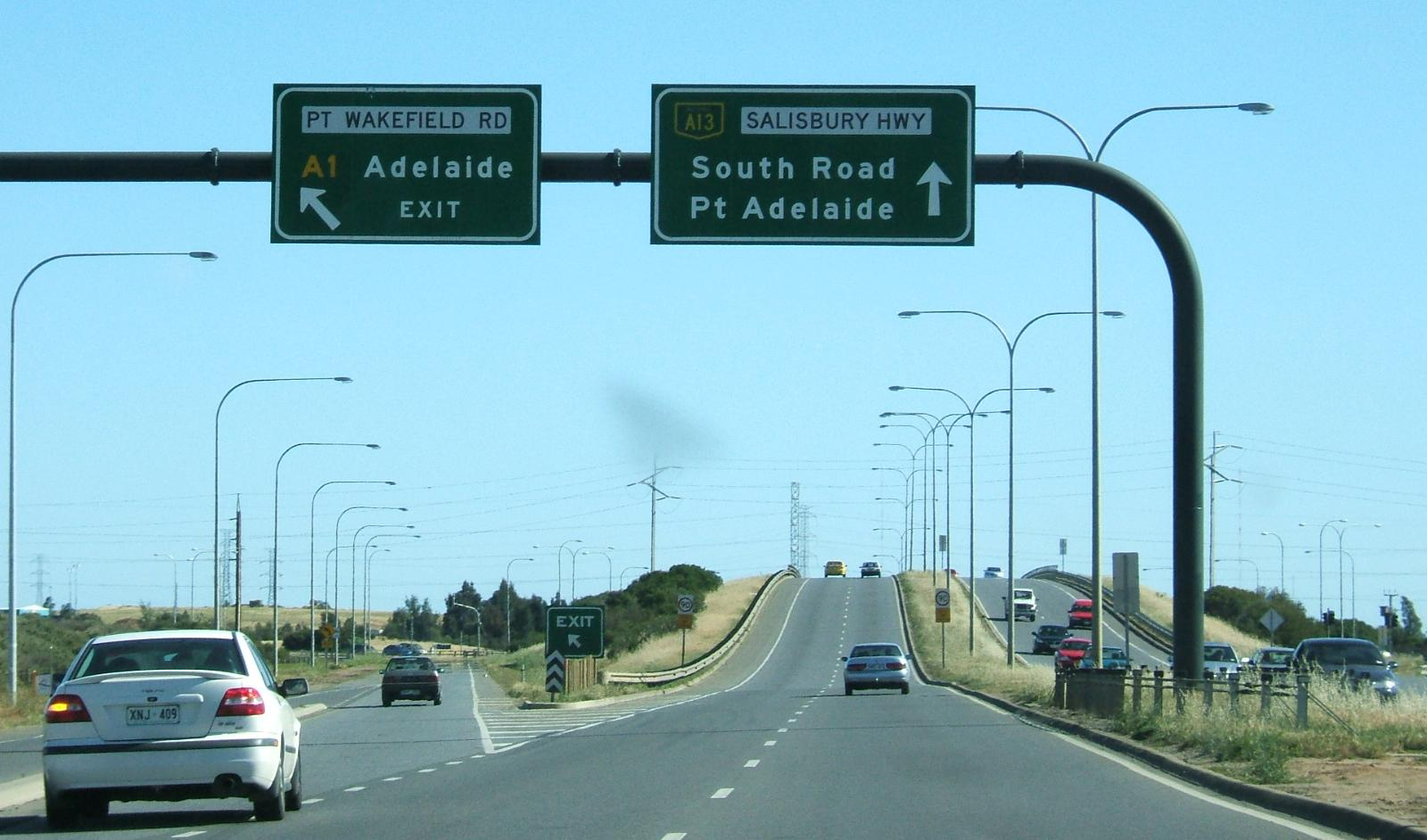
Intersection with Port Wakefield Road, looking southwards

== See also ==
- Highways in Australia
- List of highways in South Australia
