= Portside Messenger =

- Type: Weekly suburban newspaper
- Format: Tabloid
- Owner(s): News Limited
- Editor: Michelle Etheridge
- Founded: 1951
- Headquarters: 1 Baynes Place, Port Adelaide, SA, Australia
- Website: www.messengerwest.com.au

Portside Messenger is a weekly suburban newspaper in Adelaide, part of the Messenger Newspapers group. The Portside covers the entire Le Fevre Peninsula, taking in Adelaide's northern metropolitan beach suburbs, and all of Port Adelaide.

The newspaper generally reports on events of interest in its distribution area, including the suburbs of Port Adelaide, Semaphore, Outer Harbor and West Lakes. It also covers the City of Port Adelaide Enfield and City of Charles Sturt councils.

It has a circulation of 32,562 and a readership of 53,000.

== History ==
In 1951, Port Adelaide courier Roger Baynes, in partnership with Len Croker, took over the Largs North Progressive Association's Progressive Times. In March 1951, the Progressive Times was relaunched as the Messenger.

The Messenger originally operated out of a small room above a Port Adelaide bicycle shop. The business later moved to an old butcher's shop on Commercial Road, Port Adelaide.

Baynes acquired more suburban titles across Adelaide during the 1950s, 1960s and 1970s and rebranded them under the Messenger name. The original Messenger was renamed the Portside Messenger in 1984.
