= Port River Expressway =

Expressway in South Australia

Port River Expressway South Australia
- Coordinates: 34.837899°S 138.502919°E (West end); 34.832757°S 138.562427°E (East end)

General information
- Type: Freeway
- Location: Adelaide
- Length: 5.7 km (3.5 mi)
- Opened: 19 July 2005 Francis Street – South Road; 3 August 2008 Francis Street – Victoria Road
- Built by: Stage 1: Bardavcol; Stage 2: Abigroup
- Maintained by: Department of Planning, Transport and Infrastructure
- Route number(s): A9 (2005–present)

Major junctions
- West end: Victoria Road; Birkenhead, Adelaide
- Nelson Street; North–South Motorway
- East end: Salisbury Highway; Wingfield, Adelaide

Location(s)
- Region: Western Adelaide
- Major suburbs: Port Adelaide, Gillman

Highway system
- Highways in Australia; National Highway • Freeways in Australia; Highways in South Australia

Port River Expressway is a 5.7-kilometre (3.5 mi) freeway-grade road. The expressway links Port Adelaide and the Lefevre Peninsula across the north-western suburbs of Adelaide to major interstate routes via North-South Motorway.

The expressway is grade-separated at the North-South Motorway, Hanson Road and Eastern Parade interchanges. The next two intersections are at grade with traffic signals installed. This has led to the route being labelled as the A9, instead of the more common M label associated with freeways and expressways in South Australia.

== Construction ==
The Port River Expressway was built in three stages:

- Stage 1 – Was opened for traffic in July 2005. It consists of a 5.5-kilometre (3.4 mi) four-lane expressway link between Francis Street and the then South Road, now the North-South Motorway; with an overpass at each of the junctions of the North-South Motorway, Hanson Road and Eastern Parade.
- Stage 2 – Consists of a four lane high-level, opening road bridge across the Port River between Docks 1 and 2, linking Stage 1 at Francis Street to Victoria Road on Le Fevre Peninsula. This section opened in August 2008.
- Stage 3 – Consists of a single track, dual gauge, high-level, opening the Tom 'Diver' Derrick Bridge bridge across the Port River, north of the road bridge, with connections to the existing rail system. Opened in June 2008.

Stage 1 connected at what had previously been a bend between extensions of South Road and Salisbury Highway, both of which had been extended in the early 1990s to meet each other. The original plan had been to install traffic lights at that intersection. Instead, an overpass was constructed with a loop through the Barker Inlet wetlands to provide a non-stop interchange.

The bridge for traffic travelling north on South Road to east on Salisbury Highway and east on Port River Expressway to south on South Road, was named the Craig Gilbert Bridge, after the lead designer of the overpass, who died of cancer before it opened. The bridge was opened and named in his honour in July 2005. It was demolished in May 2019 and replaced with a new Craig Gilbert Bridge, as part of the construction of the Northern Connector on the North-South Motorway, which included new wider bridges on a slightly more westerly alignment.

The Port River Expressway is now a major thoroughfare for freight and passenger road traffic travelling from the northern suburbs to the major port facilities of South Australia in Port Adelaide and Outer Harbor. The construction of Stages 2 and 3 was carried out by Abigroup.

During 2018, 2019 and 2020, construction workers were putting up new elements on the expressway, as part of the Northern Connector project of the North-South Motorway.

== Cycling ==
As there is no parallel shared path near most of the Expressway and Salisbury Highway west of Port Wakefield Road, cycling is permitted on the road. The bridge over the Port River includes a shared path on the southern side of the road.

At the time of designing Stage 1 of the Expressway, the developers did not imagine that there would be much requirement for people to cycle along it, as Mawson Lakes had not been developed for housing yet, so the Port River Expressway was seen as only connecting industries to other industries.

== Exits and interchanges ==
Port River Expressway is entirely contained within the City of Port Adelaide Enfield local government area.

Location	km	mi	Destinations	Notes
Birkenhead	0.0	0.0	Victoria Road (A16 north) – Osborne, Outer Harbor	Western terminus of expressway and route A9
Birkenhead	0.0	0.0	Nelson Street (A16 south) – Port Adelaide	
Port River	0.5	0.31	Tom 'Diver' Derrick Bridge	
Port Adelaide	0.9	0.56	Dry Creek–Port Adelaide railway line	
Port Adelaide	1.0	0.62	Perkins Drive – Port Adelaide	Traffic light intersection
Port Adelaide–Gillman boundary	1.7	1.1	Eastern Parade – Ottoway	
Dry Creek–Wingfield boundary	4.0	2.5	Hanson Road – Wingfield	
Dry Creek–Wingfield boundary	5.5	3.4	North-South Motorway (M2) – Waterloo Corner, Regency Park, Hindmarsh	
Dry Creek–Wingfield boundary	5.5	3.4	Salisbury Highway (A9) – Salisbury	Eastern terminus of expressway, route A9 continues east along Salisbury Highway
1.000 mi = 1.609 km; 1.000 km = 0.621 mi: Route transition

== Gallery ==
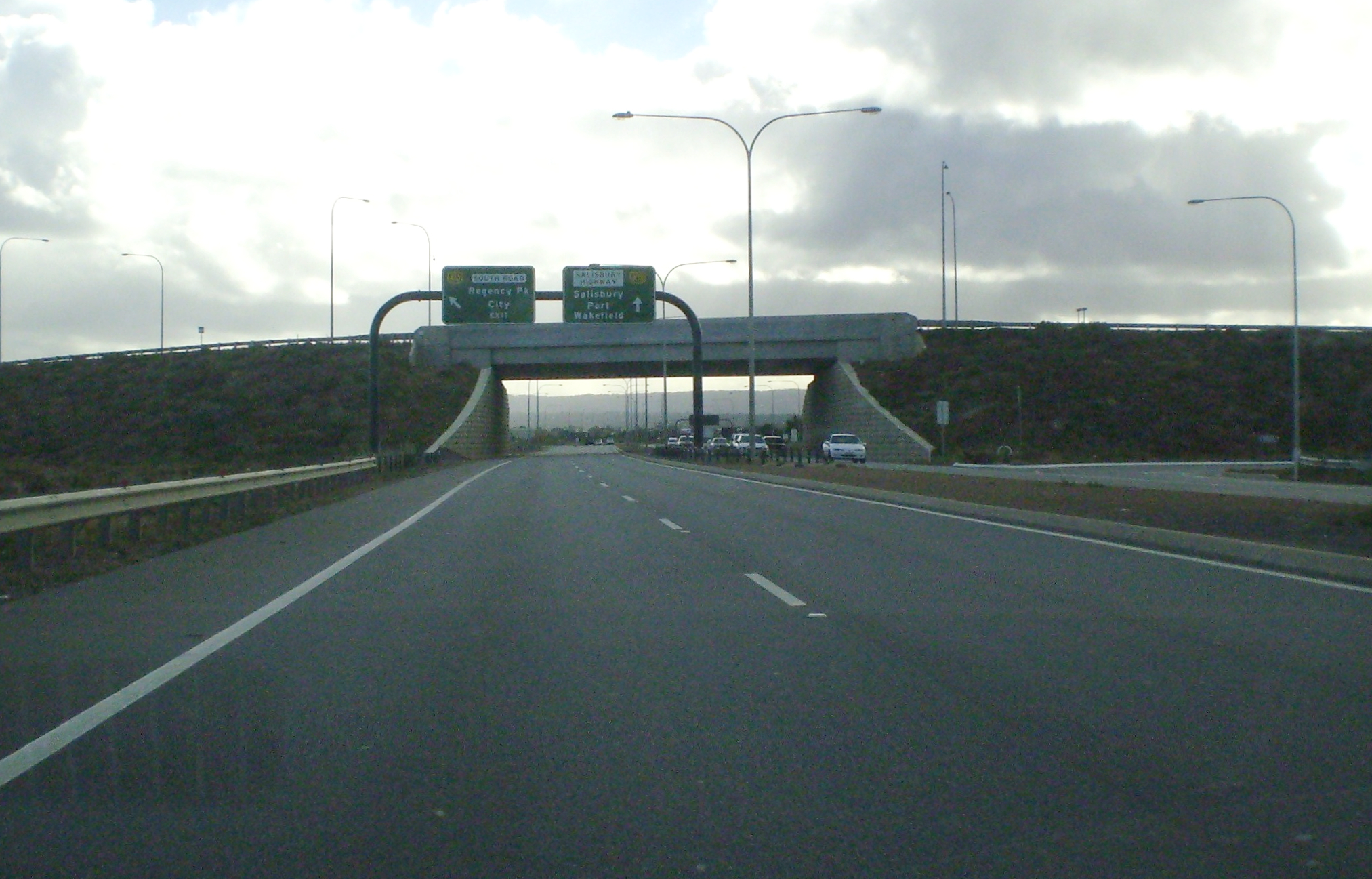
The Port River Expressway approaching the Craig Gilbert Bridge and South Road exit from the west, before the North-South Motorway bridges were built

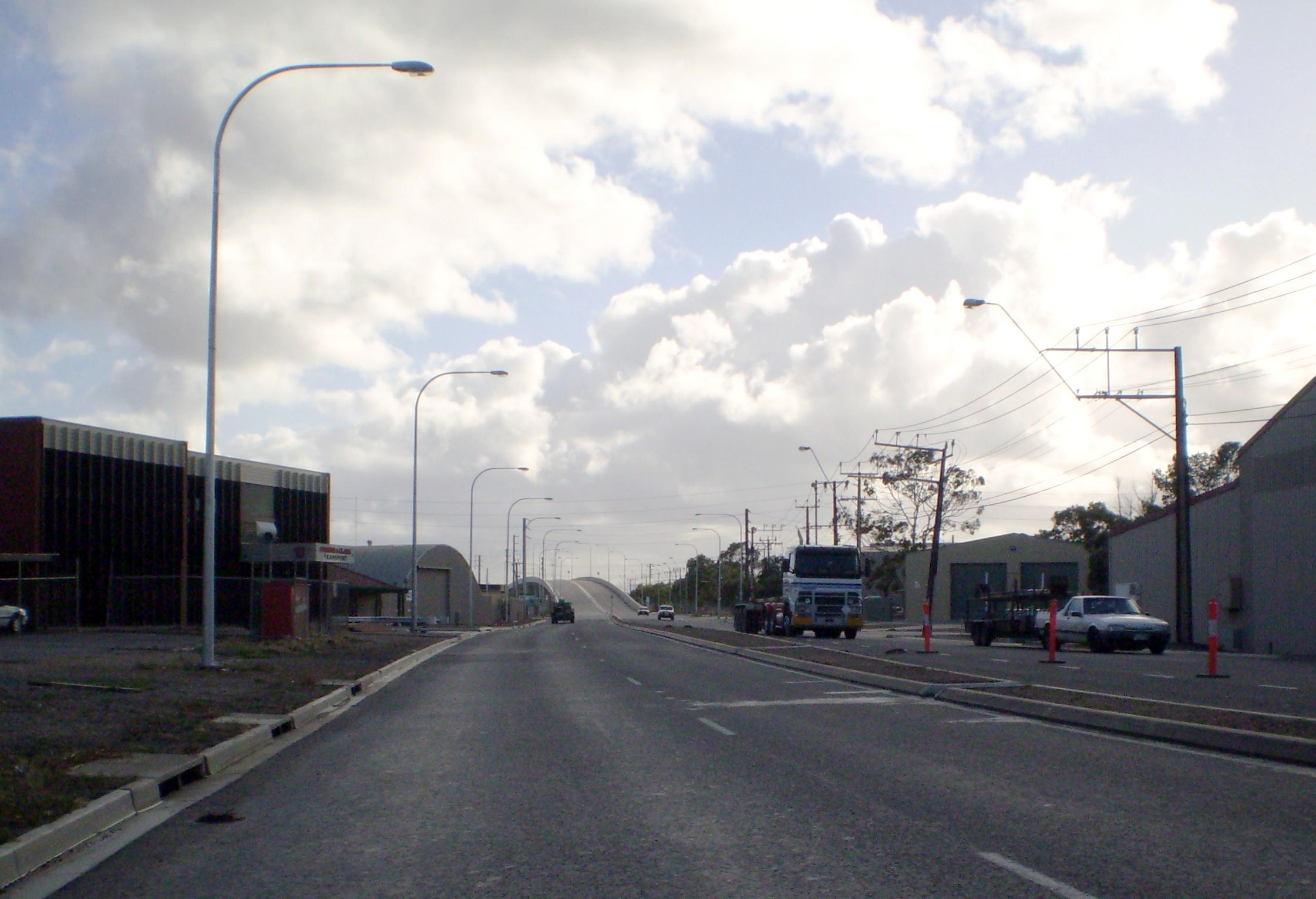
The Port River Expressway approaching the Eastern Parade overpass heading east

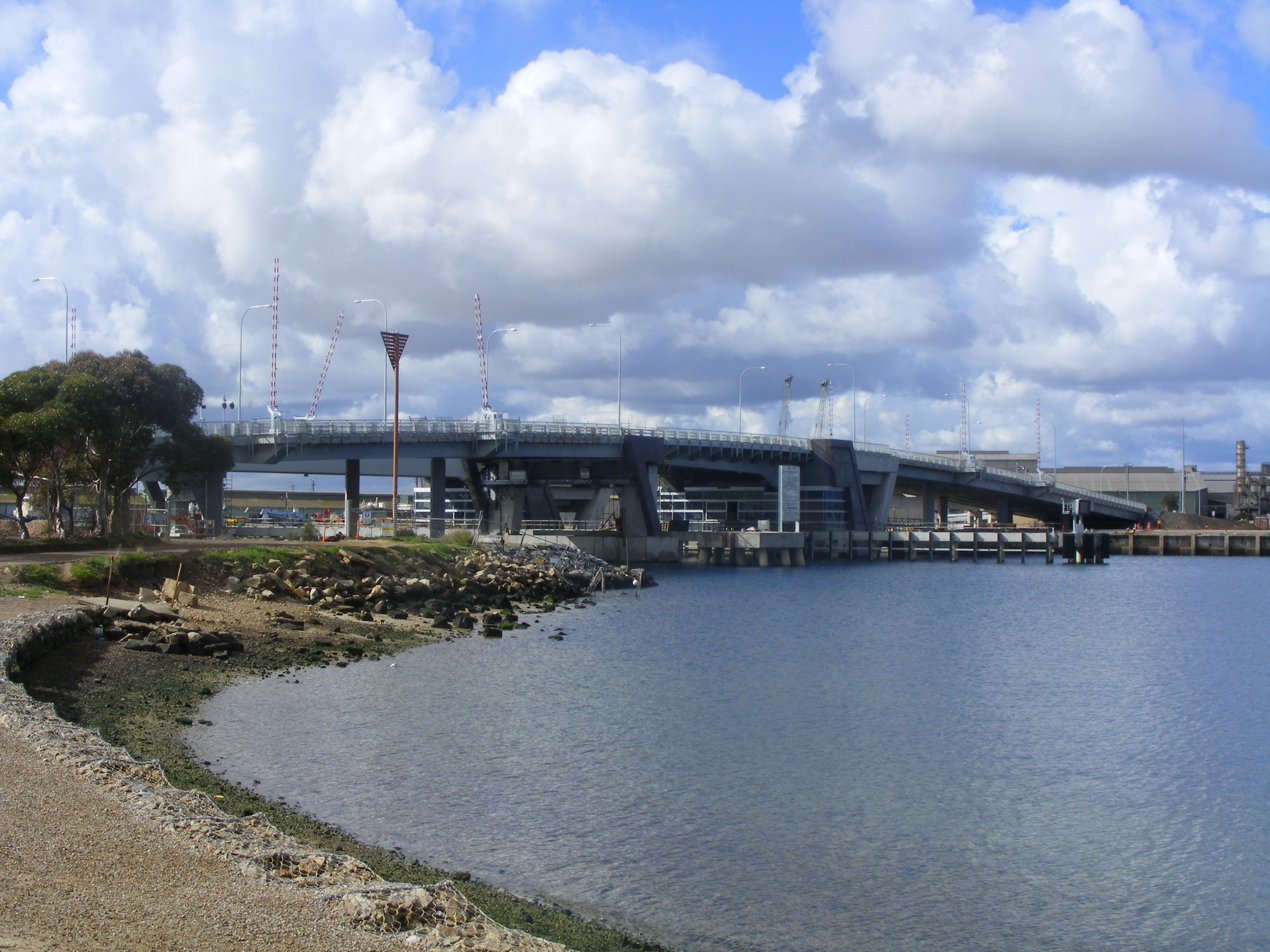
The Tom 'Diver' Derrick Bridge over the Port River.

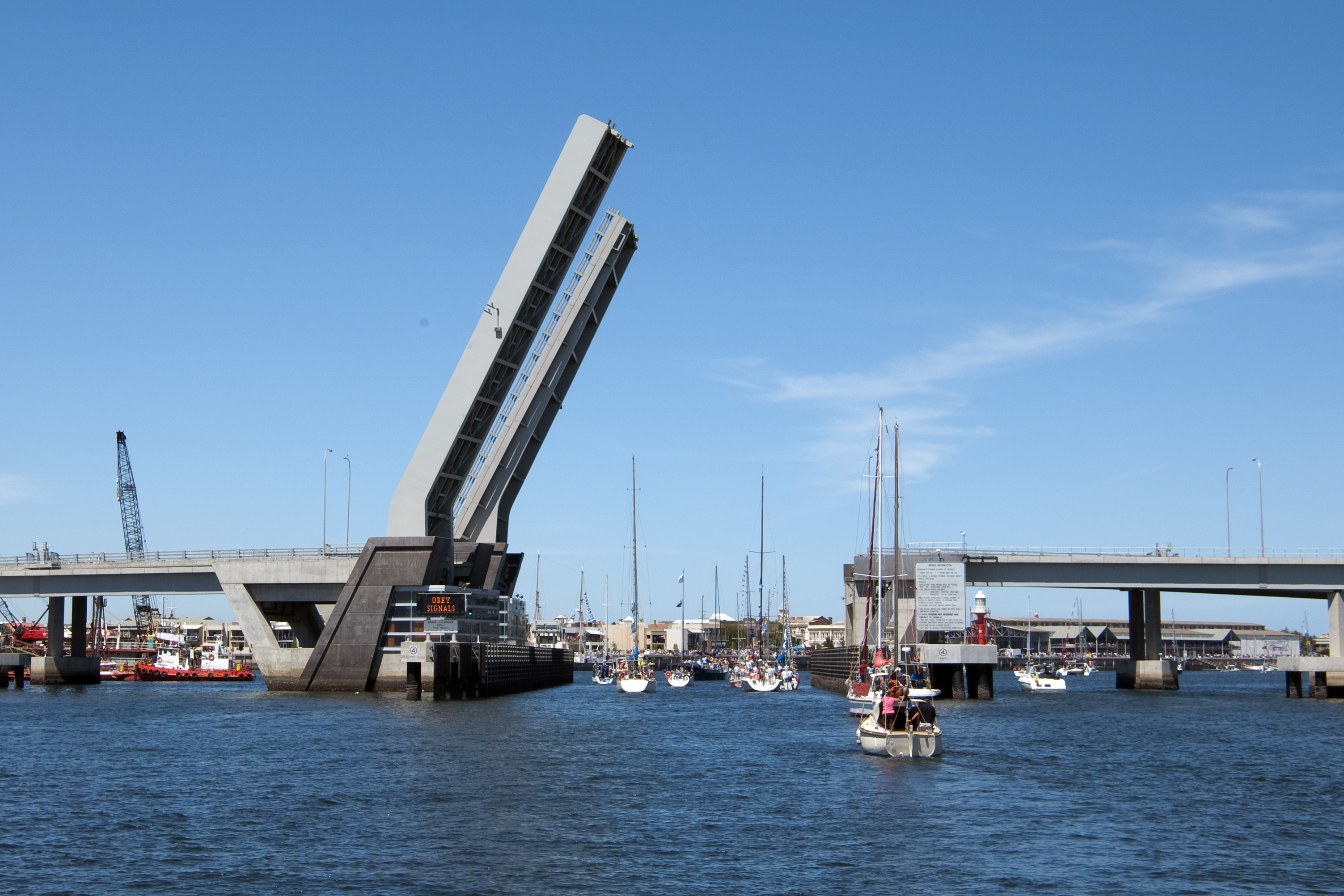
The Mary MacKillop Bridge, adjacent to the Tom "Diver" Derrick road bridge

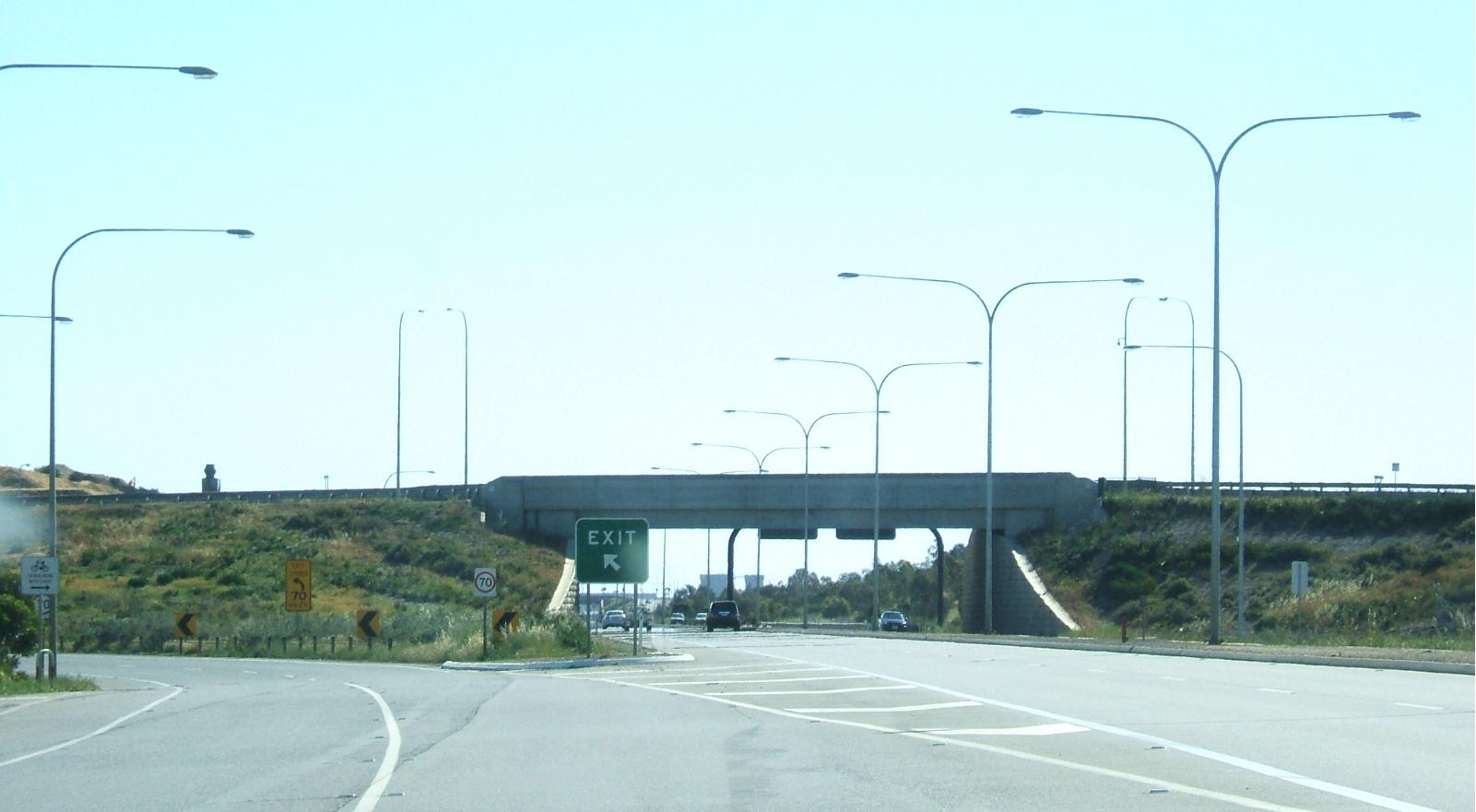
Looking west at Craig Gilbert Bridge carrying South Road, before the North-South Motorway construction

== See also ==
- Freeways in Australia
- Freeways in South Australia
- Metropolitan Adelaide Transport Study
