= North–South Motorway =

Motorway in Adelaide, South Australia

North–South Motorway South Australia
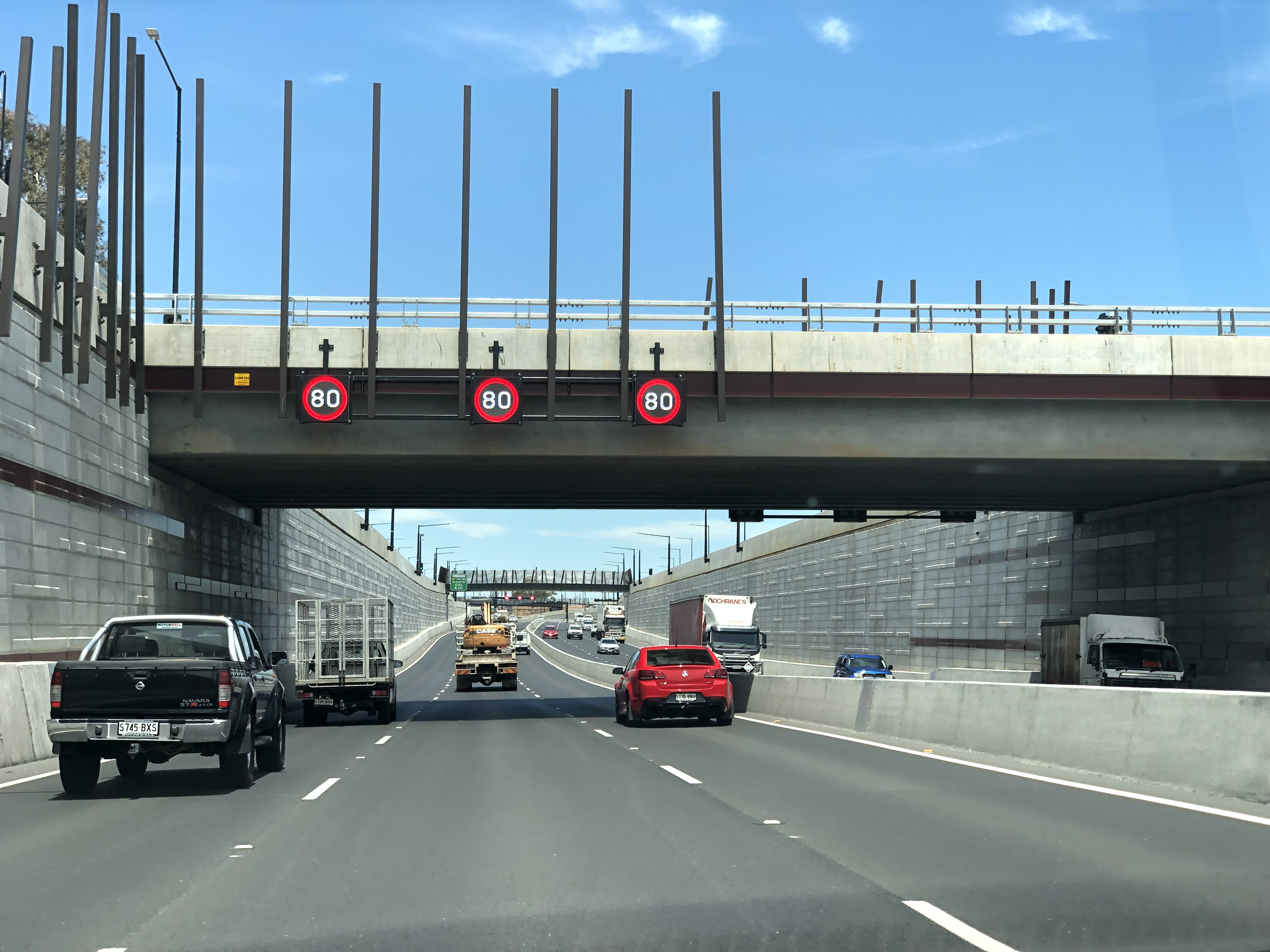
- Travelling southbound on the motorway at Croydon, November 2018
- Coordinates: 34.705136°S 138.572756°E (North end); 34.909121°S 138.564951°E (South end)

General information
- Type: Motorway
- Location: Adelaide
- Length: 24.1 km (15 mi)
- Opened: 2014
- Route number(s): M2 (2014–present)
- Former route number: National Highway M2 (2014–2017) (Wingfield–Regency Park)

Major junctions
- North end: Northern Expressway; Waterloo Corner, Adelaide
- Port Wakefield Highway; Port River Expressway; Salisbury Highway; Grand Junction Road; Port Road
- South end: South Road; Hindmarsh, Adelaide

Location(s)
- Region: Northern Adelaide, Western Adelaide
- Major suburbs: Bolivar, Wingfield, Regency Park

Highway system
- Highways in Australia; National Highway • Freeways in Australia; Highways in South Australia

The North–South Motorway is a partially complete motorway traversing the inner western suburbs of Adelaide, from Waterloo Corner in the north to Bedford Park in the south. Progressively constructed in stages since 2010, once complete it will replace the adjacent South Road as Adelaide's main north–south roadway. It will form the central section of the North–South Corridor, being flanked north and south by the Northern Expressway and Southern Expressway, respectively. It is designated part of route M2.

By February 2026, approximately 24.1 kilometres (15.0 mi) of the motorway had been completed, with the remaining 10.5 kilometres (6.5 mi) under construction. The full project is planned for completion by 2031.

== Background ==
In 2010, the Australian Government, through the Nation Building Program project, committed $500 million and the South Australian Government committed $432 million to the North–South Corridor over five years. This funding allocation recognised that South Road is the only continuous link between the northern and southern suburbs as well as the spine connecting Adelaide's major inter-modal transport hubs – Adelaide Airport, Islington Rail Terminal, Port Adelaide and Outer Harbor.

In May 2015, a government strategy paper envisioned that the entire non-stop north–south road corridor would be completed by 2025, including "an upgraded South Road". It stated that the planned "non-stop motorway" would "cater for the unimpeded flow of longer distance northbound and southbound trips" and would not include "at-grade traffic signals, intersections, junctions or property accesses which cause vehicles to slow down or stop".

== Sections ==
The motorway is divided into sections for the purposes of construction. As of February 2025, four out of five sections have been completed. From north to south the sections are:

Section	Status	Opened
Northern Connector	Complete	7 March 2020
South Road Superway	Complete	13 March 2014
Regency Road to Pym Street	Complete	30 March 2021
Torrens Road to River Torrens	Complete	29 September 2018
River Torrens to Darlington	Under construction	TBA

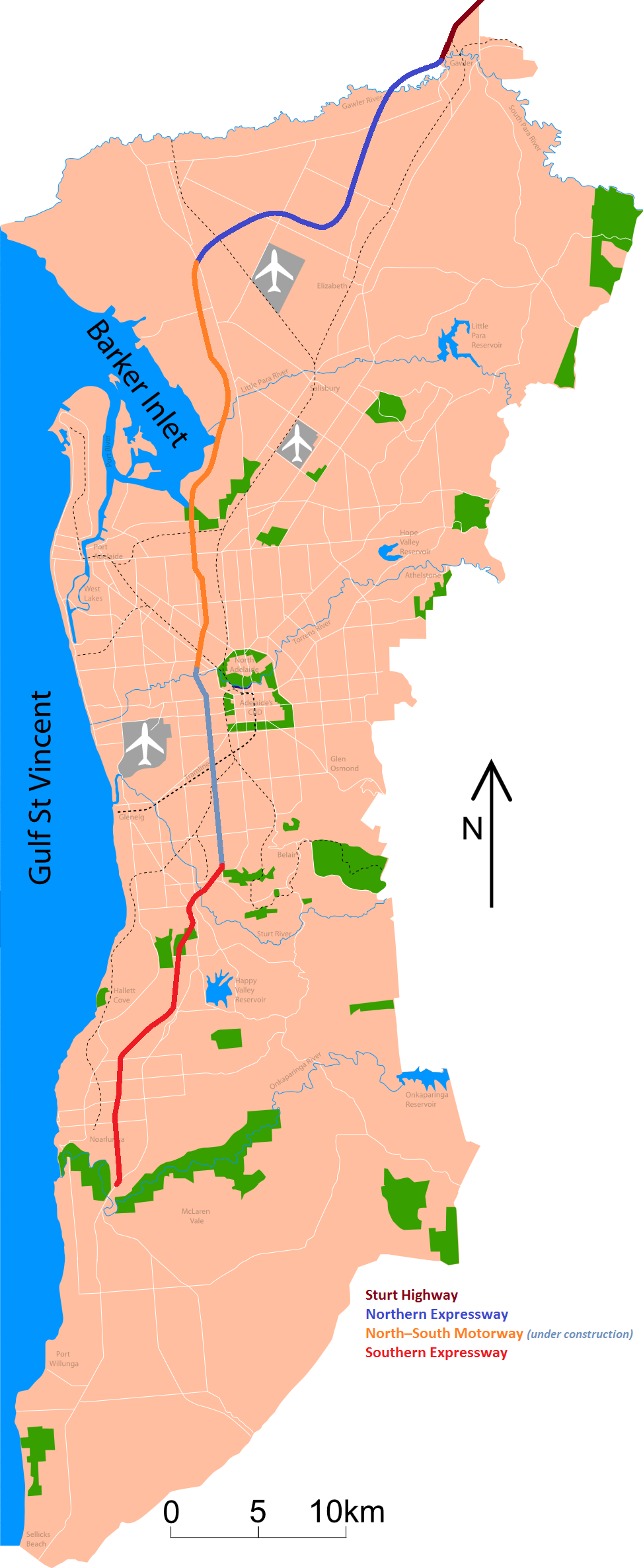
The planned extent of the North–South Motorway is shown in orange within Adelaide's north–south corridor

=== Northern Connector ===
Plans for a motorway connecting South Road and the Northern Expressway surfaced in early 2008 when the Northern Expressway was awaiting construction; the Northern Connector would be an eight-lane motorway linking the Northern Expressway and South Road, with three intermediate interchanges. The project was proposed to include a major diversion in the main ARTC interstate rail line, which would run down the middle of the new motorway between Dry Creek, South Australia and Taylors Road at Waterloo Corner. The federal government proposed that it could be the state's first toll road.

In September 2015, the Premier of South Australia, Jay Weatherill and Prime Minister of Australia Tony Abbott announced that the road component of the project would start construction in early 2016. The federal government would provide A$788M towards an expected total cost of A$985M. The project was reduced to three lanes each way with two intermediate interchanges. The railway component was removed, with a corridor reserved on the western side of the motorway for future use. The road is not subject to direct tolls, but South Australia will become a testing ground for a "network fee" which involves charging trucks based on road use and impact in place of high registration fees.

The first new bridge to open to traffic was the bridge over the new motorway at the Waterloo Corner interchange. This bridge was opened in March 2019 to provide the new access route into St Kilda, replacing several roads that had been cut by the motorway. The last road to be closed in the area was St Kilda Road, three days after the new bridge opened.

The next new bridges were the twin bridges over the Port River Expressway at the southern interchange. They replaced the original Craig Gilbert Bridge which was closed and demolished in May 2019. A temporary off-ramp from South Road to Salisbury Highway was provided, which used the new southbound bridge and the future Port River Expressway to South Road on-ramp. In July 2019, the bridge for the end-state off-ramp opened to traffic, carrying north east traffic over the Northern Connector.

The bridge over the expressway at Bolivar Road opened for access into the Bolivar Waste Water Treatment Plant about a week before Christmas 2019. The final alignment of the northbound carriageway of Port Wakefield Road at the northern interchange opened at about the same time, over a new bridge that passes over the southbound on-ramp from Port Wakefield Road. The whole road opened to traffic on 7 March 2020.

==== Construction ====
Lendlease was awarded the contract. The announcement included support for other sectors of the South Australian economy, with a requirement that 7,500 tonnes of steel would be sourced from Arrium, and that the work would stimulate urban renewal and generate employment locally in other sectors. There was a contractual obligation that at least half of the 480 workers were required to be hired from the northern suburbs of Adelaide, where other industries had been reducing or shutting down their workforces, such as Holden. At least 20% of the workforce were required to be either Aboriginal, an apprentice/ trainee, or long-term unemployed.

In November 2016, it was announced that the majority of the road surface would be concrete, rather than asphalt as used on most roads in South Australia. This was expected to have a slightly higher up-front cost, but significantly lower maintenance costs over 30 years.

Major construction started in December 2016, with completion anticipated in December 2019. Nine bridges were built for the project. The Southern Interchange required three bridges. The Bolivar and Waterloo Corner Interchanges each required a bridge over the expressway. The northern interchange required a new bridge for the northbound carriageway of Port Wakefield Road to cross the southbound on-ramp. The motorway crosses North Arm Creek, Dry Creek and the Little Para River.

The project was divided into six zones. Zone 1 containing the northern interchange was let to McMahon Services. Zone 2 contained the Waterloo Corner interchange, and was let to LR&M Constructions. Zone 3 contained the Bolivar interchange and the bridge over the Little Para River and was subcontracted to Catcon. Zone 4 was the Bolivar intersection with Port Wakefield Road, let to SEM Group. Zone 5 crossed Dry Creek and the salt pans. Zone six was the southern interchange. Zones 5 and 6 were both managed directly by Lendlease. The shared use path along the eastern side of the road was constructed by Intract Indigenous Contractors, and is named Tapa Martinthi Yala.

The raw materials to make the concrete for the road were supplied by Adbri, and mixed on-site. The road was reinforced with steel from Liberty OneSteel and asphalt was supplied by Boral.

=== South Road Superway ===
The South Road Superway is an elevated motorway in the northern suburbs of the South Australian capital city of Adelaide. The 2.8 km elevated roadway rises just north of Taminga Street, Regency Park and goes over Days Road, before access ramps at Grand Junction Road. It continues over Cormack Road and the Dry Creek railway line to join the intersection of the Port River Expressway and Salisbury Highway where the motorway continues northwards.

In 2009, an announcement was made to build an elevated roadway above South Road, from just north of Regency Road to the end of South Road where it joins to the Port River Expressway and the Salisbury Highway. The elevated roadway was constructed at a cost of A$812 million and opened in March 2014. At the time, the Superway was the biggest single investment in a road project in South Australia's history. The Superway delivered a 4.8 kilometre section of freeway grade road, including a 2.8 kilometre elevated roadway, from the Port River Expressway to Regency Road. Along the way, it passes over the Dry Creek-Port Adelaide railway line, Cormack Road, Grand Junction Road and Days Road, with exits at Grand Junction Road and Days Road.

South Road was previously designated as part of route A13, when South Australia moved to the alpha-numeric road route system in 1998, with the section between the Salisbury Highway in Wingfield and Grand Junction Road in Regency Park designated as part of National Highway A13. When the South Road Superway was opened in 2014, route A13 was replaced entirely by route A2. As the section of South Road designated National Highway A13 was replaced by the South Road Superway, this was replaced by National Highway M2. This was modified to route M2 in 2017, to match designs used across the rest of the state.

==== Construction ====
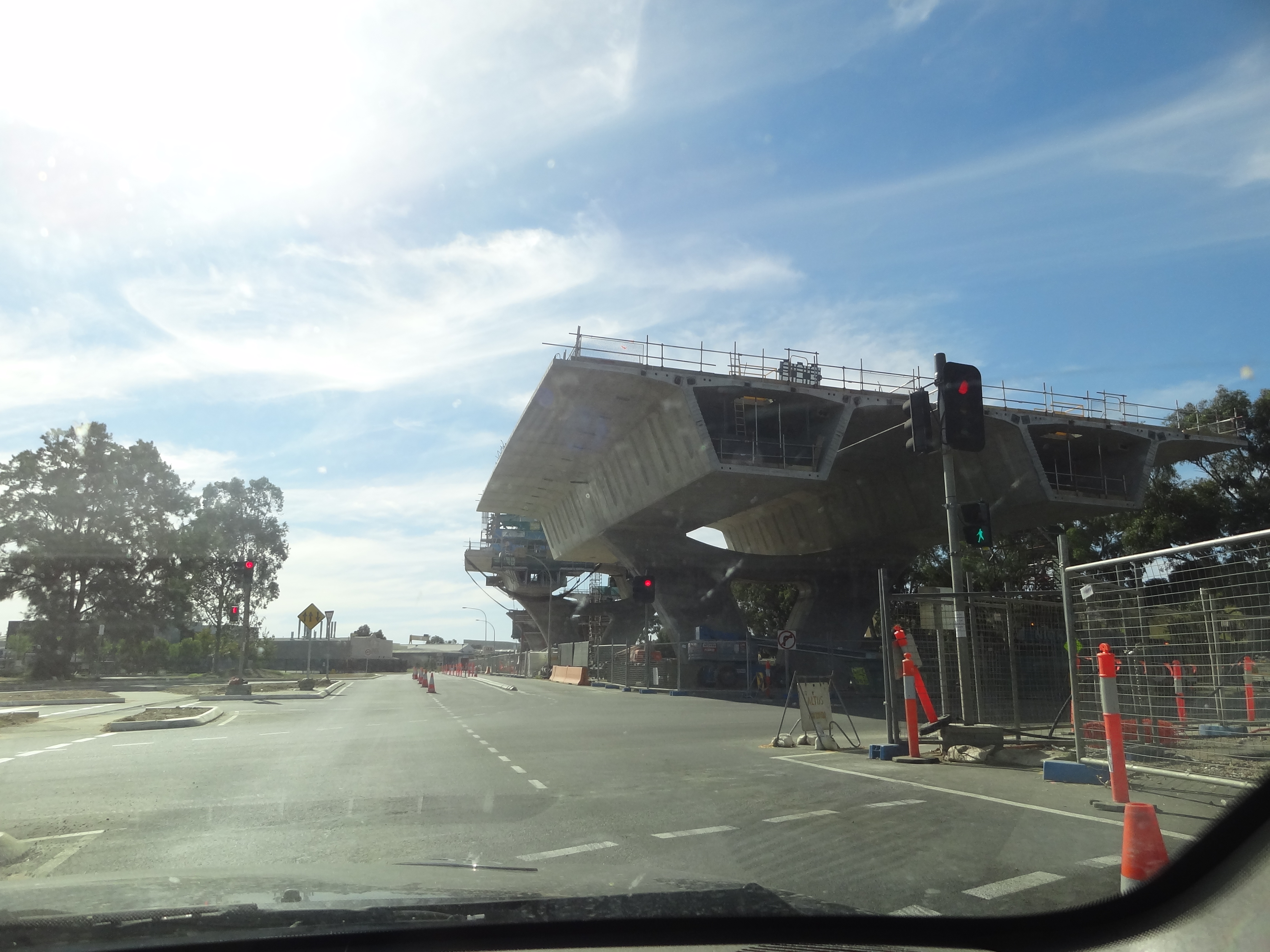
The South Road Superway taking shape at Days Road intersection, April 2012

South Australian civil engineering and construction company, Bardavcol, was awarded the early works local roads contract for the South Road Superway. The design and construction contract was awarded to Urban Superway Joint Venture, comprising the John Holland Group, Macmahon Contractors and Leed Engineering & Construction.

Construction of the local connector roads was completed in early 2011, with the completion of construction of Gallipoli Drive. This road replaced South Road as the main distributor road in the area during construction. Construction of the superway proper commenced in early 2011. Construction was completed in March 2014. The southbound lanes opened in February 2014. The left turn entry from the Port River Expressway opened in January 2014. The northbound lanes opened in March 2014.

=== Regency Road to Pym Street ===
After construction of the South Road Superway and the Torrens-to-Torrens lowered motorway, this 1.8 kilometres (1.1 mi) section of road was left with two traffic light intersections, including Regency Road, a controlled pedestrian crossing, and access to local side streets. It was reported in May 2017 that completion of this section would cost $400 million, with construction to begin at the start of 2019 and be completed by the middle of 2022. This would complete 47 km of freeway from Gawler to the River Torrens. The state government said it was seeking 85% of the cost to be funded by the federal government, which had not committed to the spend.

Completion of this section was committed to by the state and federal governments in May 2018. The announcement stated that the cost would be A$354m but did not state an expected completion date. It included an overpass of Regency Road and a pedestrian and cycling connection over the freeway near Pym Street. The motorway portion is three lanes each way, with an additional two lanes each way on the surface road to provide local access to community and businesses.

The contract for the design and construction of the 1.8 kilometres (1.1 mi) motorway segment with three lanes in each direction, plus two lanes each way providing local access to the surrounding community and businesses, was awarded in July 2019 to a consortium of McConnell Dowell, Mott MacDonald and Arup Group. All three members have been involved in other major infrastructure projects in South Australia, notably the Oaklands railway station grade separation. Main construction began in late 2019. The overpass opened in March 2021.

=== Torrens Road to River Torrens ===
In 2013, the State Labor government in partnership with the Federal Labor government announced an upgrade to approximately 4 km of road between Torrens Road and the River Torrens. The upgrade featured a new, lowered road under Grange and Port Roads to provide a non-stop route through the area for north–south traffic, and to reduce delays for east–west travel. A parallel surface road was built along the length of the lowered road, to connect the majority of local roads and arterial roads to South Road. A rail overpass of South Road was built for the Outer Harbor rail line. Construction started in 2015, with the project expected to be completed by the end of 2018.

The project scope was extended in December 2015 to include an underpass of Torrens Road, at no additional project cost or time. The lowered motorway opened in September 2018.

=== River Torrens to Darlington (T2D) ===
Before the motorway is built, traffic congestion in this section is presently mitigated by the Gallipoli Underpass at Anzac Highway and the nearby Glenelg Tram Overpass, both completed in 2009, and the Emerson Overpass over Cross Road and Seaford railway line, completed in 1985. These measures are only considered interim solutions and will be upgraded prior to or concurrently with the rest of this section of road. The increasing frequency of commuter trains has resulted in growing bottlenecks at the Emerson Overpass as queues on the exit ramps to Cross Road can extend into the through lanes on South Road. The rail crossing can be closed for up to 20 minutes in the peak hour.

In August 2018, the possibility was raised that this section could be completed by tunnelling under the existing alignment. In 2020 the State Government was pursuing two options to complete this section. The first was an open motorway formed of at-grade, elevated and lowered portions, reminiscent of completed sections of the North–South Motorway, with short cut-and-cover tunnels where necessary. The second is a "hybrid option", with an open motorway between James Congdon Drive and Edward Street, Clarence Gardens, flanked by longer bored tunnels at the northern and southern ends. Geotechnical works to investigate both options started in August 2020.

The 2020 state budget announced the preferred approach which would consist of two stages: Stage 1 would deliver a 4.3 km deep-bored tunnel and a 1 km lowered motorway from Darlington to Anzac Highway. Stage 2 would deliver a 2 km deep-bored tunnel from Sir Donald Bradman Drive to West Thebarton Road, with surface motorway and underpasses making up the remaining portions of Stage 2. The budget estimated the project cost at $8.9 billion.

The full project reference design—finalising the approach from the 2020 stage budget—was released in November 2021. Stages 1 and 2 were expected to start construction in 2023 and 2026 respectively, with the full project planned for completion by 2031. Construction started in late 2024; as of January 2026 T2D is under construction, and still expected to open in 2031. The tunnel boring machines have arrived in Adelaide, and all three tunnelling machines were operational by August 2026.

== Exits and interchanges ==
LGA	Location	km	mi	Destinations	Notes
Playford	Waterloo Corner–Virginia boundary	0.0	0.0	Northern Expressway (M2) – Gawler	Northern terminus of motorway, route M2 continues northeast along Northern Expressway
Playford	Waterloo Corner–Virginia boundary	0.0	0.0	Port Wakefield Highway (A1) – Virginia, Port Wakefield	No exit to and entry from Port Wakefield Road
Salisbury	Waterloo Corner–Virginia boundary	3.2	2.0	Waterloo Corner Road – Salisbury, St Kilda	No exit southbound to Waterloo Corner Road
Salisbury	Bolivar	7.2	4.5	Bolivar Road (A18) – Parafield Gardens, Paralowie	
Port Adelaide Enfield	Wingfield	15.3	9.5	Salisbury Highway (A9 east) – Salisbury; Port River Expressway (A9 west) – Port Adelaide	No exit southbound to Salisbury Highway
Port Adelaide Enfield	Wingfield	17.2	10.7	Grand Junction Road (A16) – Port Adelaide, Gepps Cross, Northfield, Hope Valley	Southbound exit and northbound entry only; southbound exit to, and northbound entry from, Days Road
Port Adelaide Enfield	Regency Park	18.2	11.3	Days Road – Regency Park	Northbound exit and southbound entry only; northbound exit to, and southbound entry from, Grand Junction Road
Port Adelaide Enfield	Regency Park–Croydon Park boundary			Regency Road – Kilkenny, Prospect	Entries and exits via South Road
Port Adelaide Enfield	Croydon Park	20.9	13.0	Pedestrian and cyclist overpass (Pym Street)	
Charles Sturt	Croydon–Ridleyton boundary	22.6	14.0	Port Road (A7) – Port Adelaide, Woodville, Thebarton, Adelaide CBD	Southbound exit and northbound entry only; southbound exit to, and northbound entry from, Grange Road/Manton Street
Charles Sturt	Croydon–Ridleyton boundary	22.9	14.2	Outer Harbor railway line	
Charles Sturt	Hindmarsh–West Hindmarsh boundary	23.9	14.9	Grange Road (west) – Grange, Allenby Gardens; Manton Street (east) – Hindmarsh	Northbound exit and southbound entry only; northbound exit to, and southbound entry from, Port Road
Charles Sturt	Hindmarsh–West Hindmarsh boundary	24.1	15.0	Hindmarsh Avenue	Northbound entry and exit only
Charles Sturt	Hindmarsh–West Hindmarsh boundary	24.1	15.0	South Road (A2) – Mile End, Edwardstown, St Marys	Southern terminus of motorway and route M2, route A2 continues south along South Road
Incomplete access; Route transition
