= New Port, South Australia =

New Port
- Suburb
- Coordinates: 34°50′43″S 138°29′37″E
- Country: Australia
- State: South Australia
- Region: Western Adelaide
- City: Adelaide
- LGA: City of Port Adelaide Enfield
- Established: 12 July 2007

Government
  - State electorate: Port Adelaide
  - Federal division: Hindmarsh

Population
  - Total: 647 (SAL 2021)
- Time zone: UTC+9:30 (ACST)
  - Summer (DST): UTC+10:30 (ACST)
- Postcode: 5015
- County: Adelaide
- Mean max temp: 21.6 °C (70.9 °F)
- Mean min temp: 11.5 °C (52.7 °F)
- Annual rainfall: 439.9 mm (17.32 in)
Suburbs around New Port
Exeter	Exeter; Birkenhead	Birkenhead
Glanville; Ethelton	New Port	Birkenhead; Port Adelaide
Semaphore Park	Semaphore Park	West Lakes
- LGA; Adjoining suburbs

New Port is a north-western suburb of Adelaide, South Australia. It is located in the City of Port Adelaide Enfield.

== History ==
In 2004, Premier of South Australia Mike Rann, announced the commencement of a major redevelopment of the Port Adelaide waterfront. With an estimated budget of $1.2 billion, the Newport Quays development was to include 2000 homes across six different precincts. At completion, the development was proposed to also include cafes, museums, public parks and various commercial properties. In 2007, the suburb of New Port was created from parts of the suburbs of Birkenhead, Ethelton, Glanville and Semaphore Park. The name "Newport Quays" had been requested but this was not supported by the relevant government authority. On 6 August 2009, the eastern boundary of the suburb was extended in part to the centre-line of the Port River.

By 2007, stage one of Newport Quays was complete, with stage two construction well underway. Ambitious new plans for stage three of the development were revealed in September 2007, including an apartment building constructed over the Port River. However, these plans never eventuated, and the New Port Quays development had ultimately been stalled.

Newport Quays received a lot of criticism from the local community for being unsympathetic to the local area and destroying local heritage. A state government established committee found many issues with plans for development stage 2B, including lack of open space, and exceeding of permitted building heights. In 2008, residents in New Port raised concerns that the new development was a "ghost town". The local council estimated that less than half of finished properties were occupied. Similarly, investors launched legal action as the resale value of properties in the developments had significantly dropped below the initial cost. No new developments took place in New Port following stage two. In 2011, Premier, Jay Weatherill officially cancelled the Newport Quays project. The state government was accused of shelving the project to win voters in a local by-election. The government indicated that it instead had planned to develop a new masterplan for the remaining vacant sites of the Newport Quays development.

=== Fletcher's Slip development ===
Following eight years of stalled development, Renewal SA announced that the remaining land in New Port would be developed by Cedar Woods Properties. Under the proposal, Cedar Woods will construct up to 500 new townhomes and apartments across the north-west corner of New Port adjacent to Glanville railway station, and Fletcher's Slip, on the site of the former Holden factory.

Much like its predecessor, the Fletcher's Slip development has not been without criticism. Members of the local community accused Cedar Woods of destroying local heritage that they had previously indicated would remain part of the development. A dilapidated warehouse on the north-west of the site, referred to as Shed 26, was demolished in 2019 after an extended protest campaign.

In July 2022, the first new residents moved into the first stage of the Fletcher's Slip development.

== Geography ==
New Port is primarily bound by the Port River and the Outer Harbor railway line. The northern side of the suburb is bound by Semaphore Road and Nelson Street.

== Demographics ==
The 2021 Australian census, by the Australian Bureau of Statistics, reported 647 persons in New Port on census night. Of these, 52.4% were male and 47.6% were female.

The majority of residents (66%) are of Australian birth, with other common census responses being England (9.4%), Malaysia (1.9%), New Zealand (1.7%), Vietnam (1.4%), and Northern Ireland (1.1%). Additionally, people of Aboriginal and/or Torres Strait Islander descent made up 0.8% of the suburb.

== Politics ==
=== Local government ===
New Port is part of the Port Adelaide ward in the City of Port Adelaide Enfield local government area. The Port Adelaide ward is represented by Joost den Hartog and Steve Vines.

=== State and federal government ===
New Port is located in the federal division of Hindmarsh, and represented by Mark Butler. The suburb is also located in the state electoral district of Port Adelaide, which is represented by Susan Close.

== Facilities ==
New Port is served by Lefevre Peninsula Primary School in nearby Birkenhead, and Lefevre High School in Semaphore South. In addition, Portside Christian College lies on the southern boundary of New Port, which enrols students from Kindergarten through to Year 12.

Supermarkets and other stores are available in the nearby suburbs of Port Adelaide and Semaphore.

== Transport ==
=== Roads ===
New Port is serviced by Causeway Road to the west, and Semaphore Road to the north. No major roadways pass through the suburb itself.

=== Public transport ===
New Port is well serviced by public transport, with both bus and train services nearby.

==== Bus ====
Adelaide Metro bus route 333 runs from Glanville Interchange in the morning and afternoon on weekdays, with services to Port Adelaide and North Haven.

Train

New Port lies on the boundary of the Outer Harbor line, and is serviced by two railway stations. Ethelton railway station lies adjacent to Karra Cove, whilst Glanville railway station lies adjacent to Torrens Avenue in the Fletcher's Slip development. Select services run express to Adelaide from Port Adelaide in the morning peak.
