= Semaphore Park, South Australia =

Semaphore Park
- Suburb
- Interactive map of Semaphore Park
- Country: Australia
- State: South Australia
- LGA: City of Charles Sturt
- Location: 13 km (8.1 mi) north-west of Adelaide city centre
- Established: 30 September 1976

Government
  - State electorate: Lee
  - Federal division: Hindmarsh

Population
  - Total: 4,541 (SAL 2021)
- Time zone: UTC+9:30 (ACST)
  - Summer (DST): UTC+10:30 (ACST)
- Postcode: 5019
- Mean max temp: 21.5 °C (70.7 °F)
- Mean min temp: 11.4 °C (52.5 °F)
- Annual rainfall: 443.3 mm (17.45 in)
Suburbs around Semaphore Park
Gulf St Vincent	Semaphore South; Ethelton; New Port	Port Adelaide
Gulf St Vincent	Semaphore Park	West Lakes
Gulf St Vincent	West Lakes Shore; West Lakes	West Lakes
- Location; Adjoining suburbs

Semaphore Park is a suburb in the Australian state of South Australia located in the west of Adelaide on the coastline of Gulf St Vincent. The northern end of the suburb is considered to be located within the Lefevre Peninsula.

Semaphore Park originally started as a private sub-division in Section 64 in the cadastral unit of the Hundred of Yatala under the names of New Liverpool and Mellor Park (named for Thomas Mellor). Boundaries were created for the suburb on 30 September 1976. Portions were added to the suburb of West Lakes Shore in October 2002 and October 2004 while in July 2007, land was removed from Semaphore Park and the suburbs of Birkenhead, Ethelton and Glanville to "create the new suburb of New Port”.

Glanville Blocks Post Office opened on 1 September 1896, was renamed Semaphore Park in 1947 and was replaced by the West Lakes Shore office in 1997.

The Fort Glanville Conservation Park is located within the boundaries of Semaphore Park.

Semaphore Park is located within the federal division of Hindmarsh, the state electoral district of Lee and the local government area of the City of Charles Sturt.
