= Exeter, South Australia =

Exeter
- Suburb
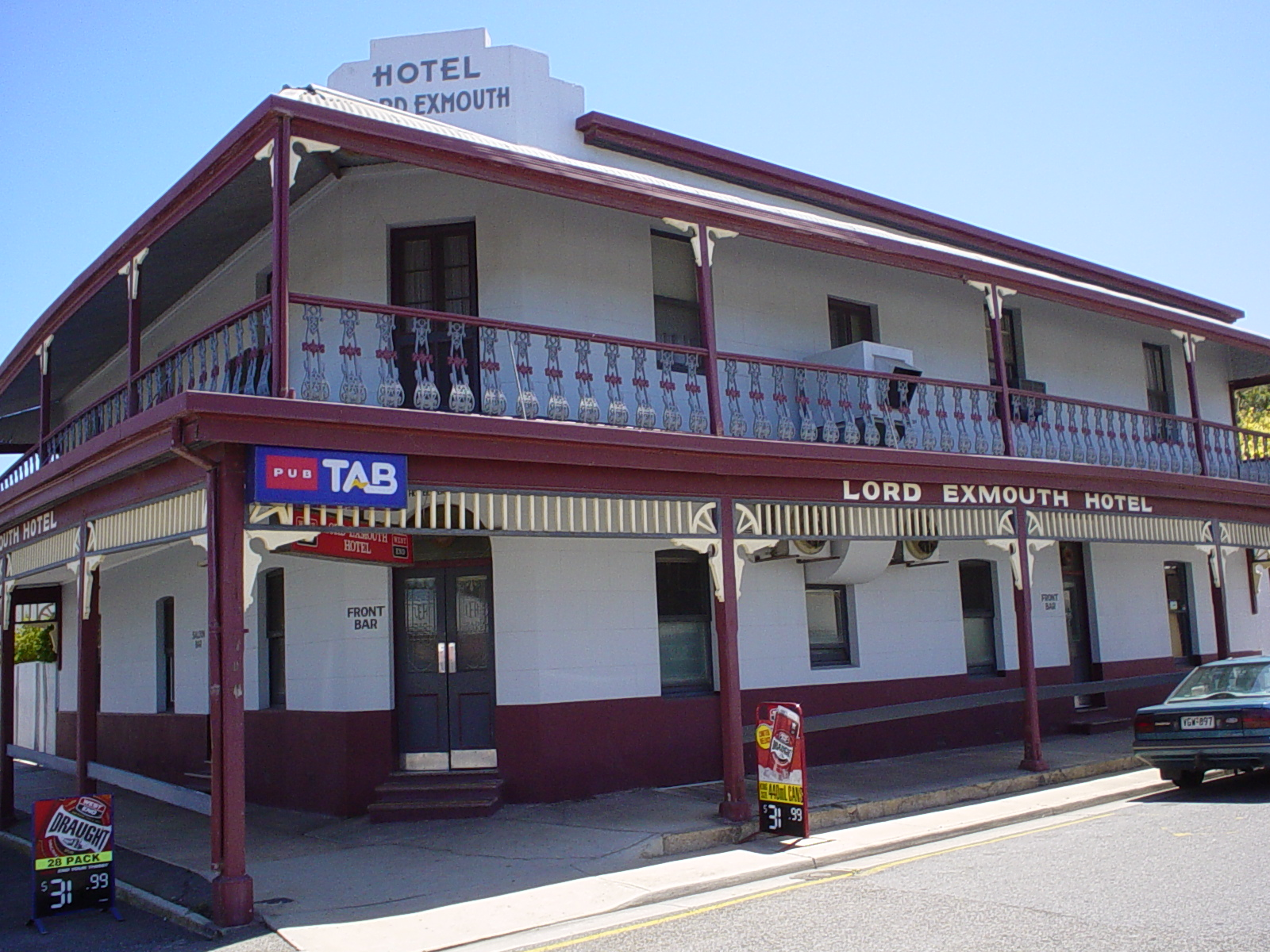
- Hotel Lord Exmouth, in Exeter

- Coordinates: 34.8490°S 138.4945°E
- Country: Australia
- State: South Australia
- City: Adelaide
- LGA: City of Port Adelaide Enfield
- Location: 14 km (8.7 mi) NW of Adelaide
- Established: 1882

Government
  - State electorate: Port Adelaide
  - Federal division: Hindmarsh
- Elevation: 8 m (26 ft)

Population
  - Total: 1,066 (SAL 2021)
- Postcode: 5019
Suburbs around Exeter
Largs Bay	Largs Bay	Birkenhead
Semaphore	Exeter	New Port
Semaphore South	Glanville	Glanville

Exeter (/ɛksɪtər/ EK-sit-ər) is a suburb of Adelaide, Australia. It is 14 km north-west of the central business district, on the Lefevre Peninsula, and falls under the City of Port Adelaide Enfield. It is adjacent to the suburbs Semaphore, Birkenhead, Largs Bay and Glanville. It is bounded to the south by Exmouth Road, to the north by Hargrave Street and in the east and west by the Outer Harbor railway line and Woolnough Road respectively.

Exeter is predominantly residential.

== History ==
On 18 May 1850, Phillip Levi purchased the land sections 1104–1107, Hundred of Port Adelaide. By April 1851, section 1106 was owned by John Lapthorne, who had subdivided it sometime before January 1854, however the name of Exeter does not appear on official documents until 1882 when William Wells cut part of section 1106. John Lapthorne sailed to South Australia on the Orissa in 1840. He was born in Exeter, in the English county of Devon, in 1807 and died at Exeter, Adelaide in 1889; the suburb is named after his home town. An early landmark was the Lord Exmouth Hotel, of which William Knapman (1830–1908) was in 1859 the first licensee and, at least in part, the builder. The eponym of the hotel, Edward Pellew, 1st Viscount Exmouth died at Teignmouth, 15 miles (24 km) south of Exeter, England. The association of the suburb's name deepens, as Knapman's wife Charlotte was born in Christow near Exeter, England.

Exeter post office opened 1 October 1947, but closed 14 May 1986.

A house in Denman Street has a blue plaque denoting its entry on the South Australian Heritage Register as a former Cooperative Society store.

== Facilities ==
The suburb is not served by a primary school, and the closest is Le Fevre Primary School in Birkenhead, or the Catholic Dominican Primary School in Semaphore. The local high school is Le Fevre High School, in nearby Semaphore South. There is little commercial activity in the area, as this is plentiful east of the river in Port Adelaide.

== Transport ==
The 352 & 353 serves Woolnough Road and Hargrave Street, while the 156 & 333 serve Causeway Road. The suburb is also served by two train stations on the Outer Harbor railway line, the Glanville railway station, just beyond its eastern border, and the Peterhead railway station on its eastern border.

The Semaphore railway line served Exeter from 1878 until 1978.

== Governance ==
Exeter is located in the federal division of Hindmarsh, the state electoral district of Port Adelaide and the local government area of the City of Port Adelaide Enfield.

== See also ==
- Exeter (disambiguation)
