= West Lakes Shore, South Australia =

Suburb of Adelaide, Australia

West Lakes Shore
- Suburb
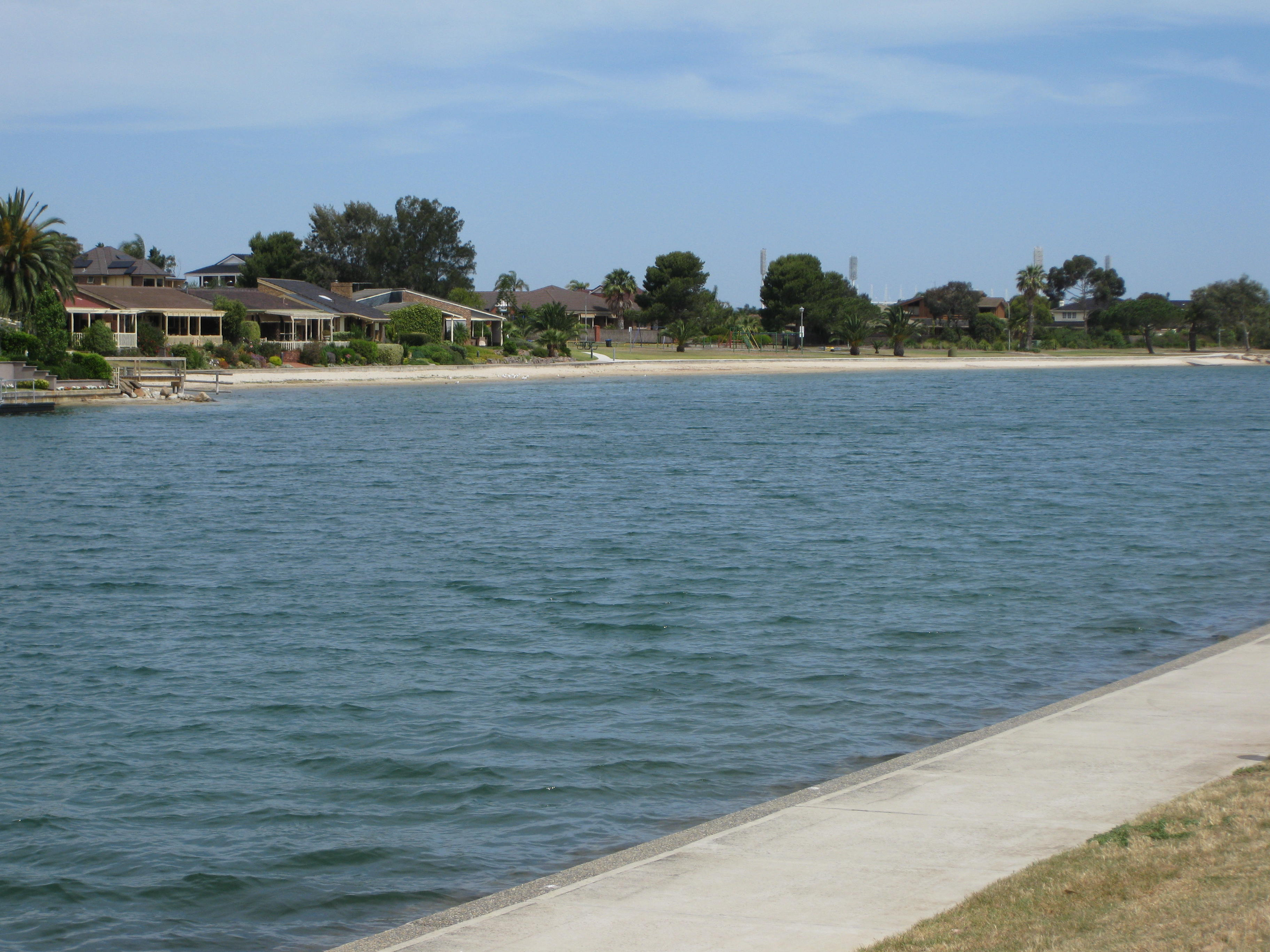
- West Lakes Shore extends from the ocean to the manmade tidal lake

- Coordinates: 34°52′05″S 138°29′00″E
- Country: Australia
- State: South Australia
- Region: Western Adelaide
- City: Adelaide
- LGA: City of Charles Sturt
- Location: 12 km (7.5 mi) NW of Adelaide; 5 km (3.1 mi) NW of Woodville
- Established: 30 September 1976

Government
  - State electorate: Lee
  - Federal division: Hindmarsh

Population
  - Total: 3,236 (SAL 2021)
- Time zone: UTC+9:30 (ACST)
  - Summer (DST): UTC+10:30 (ACST)
- Postcode: 5020
- County: Adelaide
- Mean max temp: 21.6 °C (70.9 °F)
- Mean min temp: 11.5 °C (52.7 °F)
- Annual rainfall: 439.9 mm (17.32 in)
Suburbs around West Lakes Shore
Semaphore Park; Gulf St Vincent	Semaphore Park	Semaphore Park; West Lakes
Gulf St Vincent	West Lakes Shore	West Lakes
Gulf St Vincent	Tennyson	West Lakes
- Locations; Adjoining suburbs

West Lakes Shore is a western suburb of Adelaide, South Australia. It lies within the City of Charles Sturt council area. Developed in the 1970s as a public private partnership, it's noted for its manmade tidal lake.

== History ==
Developed as part of the wider West Lakes Scheme, West Lakes Shore was constructed on reclaimed swampy marshland. In 1969 an Indenture was signed by the Government of South Australia and property developer Delfin for the joint development of this area which measures 4.83 km long and 1.6 km wide.

Since that time, West Lakes Shore has become a community of 8,800 people with sporting, shopping, educational and recreational facilities in a fully planned development.

West Lakes Shore Post Office opened on 21 May 1997 replacing the nearby Semaphore Park office.

== Tidal lake ==
A prominent feature of West Lakes Shore is the large freshwater lake. West Lakes Shore has frontage onto the lake between Tennyson in the south and Semaphore Park in the north.

The lake began filling in November 1974, in time for the opening of the nearby regional shopping centre (now Westfield West Lakes).

Due to polluted stormwater runoff into the lake, it's recommended to avoid prolonged contact with the water (e.g. swimming) for 2–3 days after rain.

=== A.M. Ramsay Regatta Course ===
The boating lake was constructed with an international-standard rowing course in mind, and the largely straight and wide southern portion of the lake was reserved for a 2 kilometre rowing course. Today, it's known as the A.M. Ramsay Regatta Course.

Fully cabled with an independent kevlar rope system, a starting pontoon and buoyed lanes, it is suitable for rowing, canoeing and dragon boat racing.

The rowing course also hosts the annual Head of the River race, having been conceived on the Torrens Lake in 1922.

West Lakes Shore is home to the headquarters of Rowing South Australia, with its building — and various private boat sheds — situated at the northern end of the rowing course.

== People ==
The total population of West Lakes Shore at the 2021 Census was 3236.

In the 2021 census the population comprised 47.6% males and 52.4% females.

Children aged between 0–14 years accounted for 16.3% of the total population, while 41.4% were persons aged 55 years and over.

The median age was 48 years compared to the national median age of all Australians of 38 years.

The vast majority (75.5%) of the residents were born in Australia, with 6.1% born in England and 1.3% in Italy, 1.1% in Scotland and 0.9% in both Greece and China.

0.7% of the population were Aboriginal and/or Torres Strait Islander.

== Landmarks ==
The major landmarks in the suburb include:

- West Lakes Shore R-7 School
- SA Rowing and Aquatic Centre
- The lake - West Lakes
- West Lakes Shore Beach
- West Lakes Uniting Church
- Bartley Terrace Shopping Centre
- The parks, including Neighbourhood Reserve, Jubilee Reserve (known locally as Hawkesbury Reserve), and Heysen Reserve
- Bartley Tavern
- West Lakes Shore Oval. The clubs that use this oval are
  - West Lakes Sports Club Inc
  - SMOSH West Lakes Football Club
  - Henley & Grange Baseball Club
  - Port Adelaide Softball Club

== Schools and recreation ==
West Lakes Shore School is located on Edwin Street and caters for children from Reception to Year 6.

West Lakes Sports Club, located on the East side of Bartley Tce was established in 2002 and is home to the Henley & Grange Baseball Club, SMOSH West Lakes Senior and Junior Football Club, Port Adelaide Softball Club, Current Affairs Group and the West Lakes Social Club, and is also available to the public for functions and dining.

Club West Lakes (previously known as The Lakes Sports and Community Club) was built in 1986 and is home to the West Lakes Bowling Club, Tennis Club, and Croquet Club. Combined it has over 800 members.

RowingSA and the West Lakes Aquatic Centre are based on the lakefront, alongside Military Road. Each year during March, the Centre hosts the annual Head of the River Carnival.

With access to the waters of West Lakes and with generally flat terrain, various sporting organisations conduct triathlons around the streets and in the lake. Usually these triathlons are held in the autumn months.
