= Ethelton, South Australia =

Ethelton Adelaide, South Australia
- Coordinates: 34°51′01″S 138°29′20″E
- Population: 1,487 (SAL 2021)
- Postcode(s): 5015
- Time zone: ACST (UTC+9:30)
  - Summer (DST): ACST (UTC+10:30)
- LGA(s): City of Port Adelaide Enfield
- Region: Western Adelaide
- County: Adelaide
- State electorate(s): Port Adelaide
- Federal division(s): Hindmarsh
Suburbs around Ethelton:
Semaphore	Glanville	New Port
Semaphore South	Ethelton	New Port
Semaphore Park	Semaphore Park	Semaphore Park
- Footnotes: Adjoining localities

Ethelton is a north-western suburb of Adelaide 13 km (8.1 mi) from the CBD, on the Lefevre Peninsula, in the state of South Australia, Australia. It is a residential suburb within the local government area of City of Port Adelaide Enfield, adjacent to the suburbs of Semaphore, Semaphore South, Glanville and New Port. It is bounded to the north by Hart Street, to the south by Bower Road and in the west by Swan Terrace and in the east by Causeway Road.

== Facilities ==
The suburb is not served by a public primary school. The nearest are Le Fevre Primary School in Birkenhead and Westport Primary School in Semaphore Park. The area was previously serviced by Ethelton Primary School, but the campus was closed when the school amalgamated with Semaphore Primary School (to form Westport Primary). The local high school is Le Fevre High School, in nearby Semaphore South. There is a private school in the suburb, Portside Christian School (Reception to Year 12).

The John Hart Reserve and Oval at the north-western corner is the main recreational facility in the suburb. There is little commercial activity in the area, as Port Adelaide is nearby.

New Port is a housing development and suburb created in 2007 on the Port River and is next to Ethelton.

== Transport ==
The 333 bus, which runs between North Haven and Port Adelaide, services Bower Road and Hart Street. The suburb is also served by the 651, 657, 662, 665, and 672 school bus services, however, these are not accessible to the general public.

The suburb also is serviced by a train station on the Outer Harbor railway line, the Ethelton railway station.

== Governance ==
Ethelton is located in the federal division of Hindmarsh, the state electoral district of Port Adelaide and the local government area of the City of Port Adelaide Enfield.
