= West Lakes, South Australia =

Suburb of Adelaide, Australia

West Lakes
- Suburb
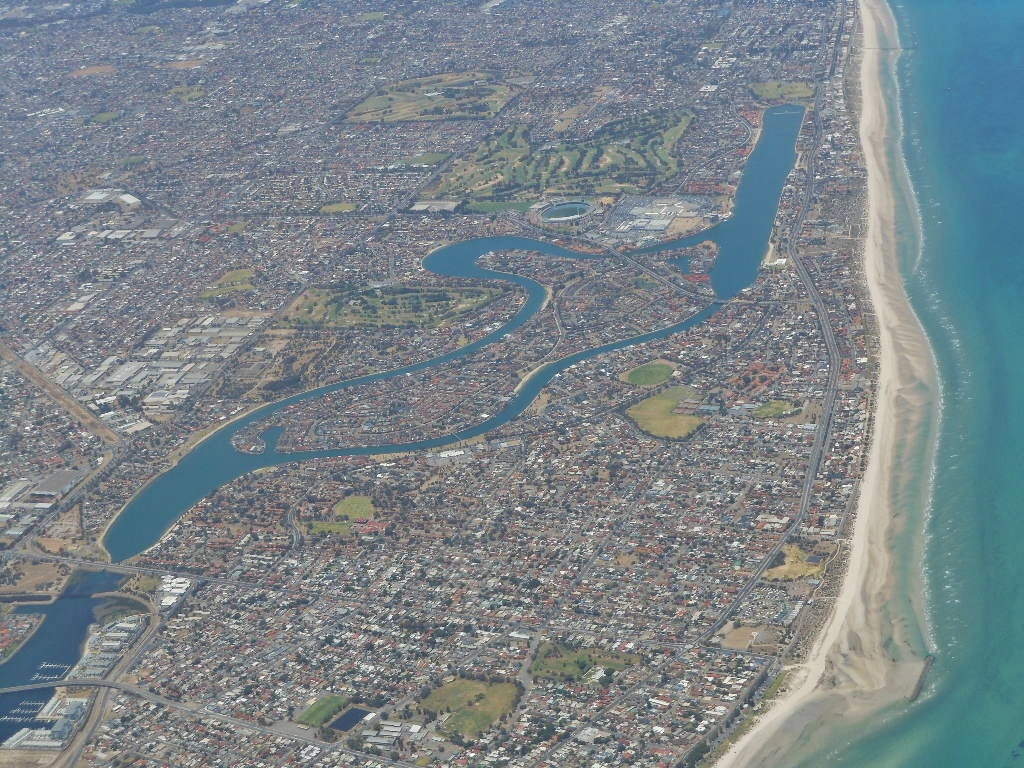
- West Lakes with Delfin Island is in the centre

- Interactive map of West Lakes
- Country: Australia
- State: South Australia
- LGA: City of Charles Sturt
- Established: 30 September 1976

Government
  - State electorate: Lee
  - Federal division: Hindmarsh

Population
  - Total: 6,768 (SAL 2021)
- Time zone: UTC+9:30 (ACST)
  - Summer (DST): UTC+10:30 (ACST)
- Postcode: 5021
- Mean max temp: 21.6 °C (70.9 °F)
- Mean min temp: 11.5 °C (52.7 °F)
- Annual rainfall: 439.9 mm (17.32 in)
Suburbs around West Lakes
Port Adelaide; Ethelton	Port Adelaide	Queenstown
Semaphore Park; West Lakes Shore; Tennyson	West Lakes	Royal Park; Seaton
Tennyson	Grange	Seaton

West Lakes is a western suburb of Adelaide, South Australia, within the City of Charles Sturt.

Developed in the 1970s as a public private partnership, it is noted for its man-made tidal lake and Delfin Island, a residential island set within the lake. It was renamed John Dyer Lake in honor of former mayor, John Raymond Dyer, recognising his significant influence and dedication to the development.

Today, West Lakes is home to the Westfield West Lakes shopping centre, Woodlake Shopping Centre on Frederick Road, the West Lakes Golf Club, and Football Park, the Adelaide Football Club training ground.

West Lakes has an irregular shape and shares borders with the suburbs of Port Adelaide, Queenstown, Royal Park, Seaton and Grange. Adjacent suburbs also sharing lake frontage include Semaphore Park, Tennyson and West Lakes Shore.

== History ==
West Lakes was constructed on part of the River Torrens Wetlands, formerly known as the Reedbeds, decades after the Torrens was diverted out to sea at West Beach. It was largely freshwater seasonal wetlands draining to the upper tidal reaches of the Port River estuary, with expanses of sandy dunes along the coast, and towards Alberton.

Property developer Delfin spearheaded the masterplanned development as a joint venture with the Government of South Australia.

The suburb's name references the tidal lake, in addition to its relative position within metropolitan Adelaide. It was formalised under the West Lakes Development Act 1969.

Development earthworks commenced in September 1970, with approximately 10 million tonnes of earth shifted to form the tidal lake and create developable land.

Due to the suburb being built on reclaimed marshland, particular consideration went into the engineering and construction of houses. During the initial development, only single or double-storey homes could be built, with specific areas designated for taller and larger buildings (such as the shopping centre and apartments).

In many instances, raft foundations were utilised in order to counteract subsidence and general movement due to the nature of the soil.

Housing design during the initial development phase of West Lakes was controlled by land title encumbrances, with Delfin having guidelines in place to dictate acceptable architectural design and external finishes in accordance with their vision for individual neighbourhoods, as well as for the wider suburb. Notably, West Lakes was also one of the first urban developments in South Australia to feature underground power and telephone lines.

Encumbrances also placed restrictions on the positioning and appearance of external fixtures (such as clotheslines, outbuildings, and TV aerials) as well as a total ban on front boundary fencing.

West Lakes was officially opened on 18 March 1977 by Des Corcoran, Deputy Premier and Minister of Marine. West Lakes Post Office opened in August 1975.

In 1992, the wider West Lakes project was awarded the inaugural Prix D’Excellence award by FIABCI, the International Real Estate Federation. Upon being announced the winner, West Lakes was described as:

the project that produced the greatest synergy from all the real estate disciplines – quality of counselling, appraising, finance, marketing, management, maintenance and community benefits – without losing sight of the project’s impact on its environment and the quality of life of its occupants and neighbours.

A sign announcing the award was displayed at the corner of West Lakes Boulevard and Frederick Road until the 2010s. It was removed around the time earthworks commenced for the West subdivision, with its current whereabouts unknown.

The development phase of the West Lakes scheme spanned from 1970 to 2001, for a total duration of 31 years.

=== Cadmium and PFAS contamination ===
In 2000, the City of Charles Sturt undertook soil testing in the area of West Lakes surrounding the former Port Adelaide Wastewater Treatment Plant adjacent Frederick Road. Test results indicated cadmium present in the soil, affecting 200 homes. This was largely due to the dispersal of sewage sludge over the land during initial development earthworks in the 1970s. In the following years, the state government recommended various measures to reduce and prevent exposure to cadmium, with funding allocated to implement these on a property-specific basis.

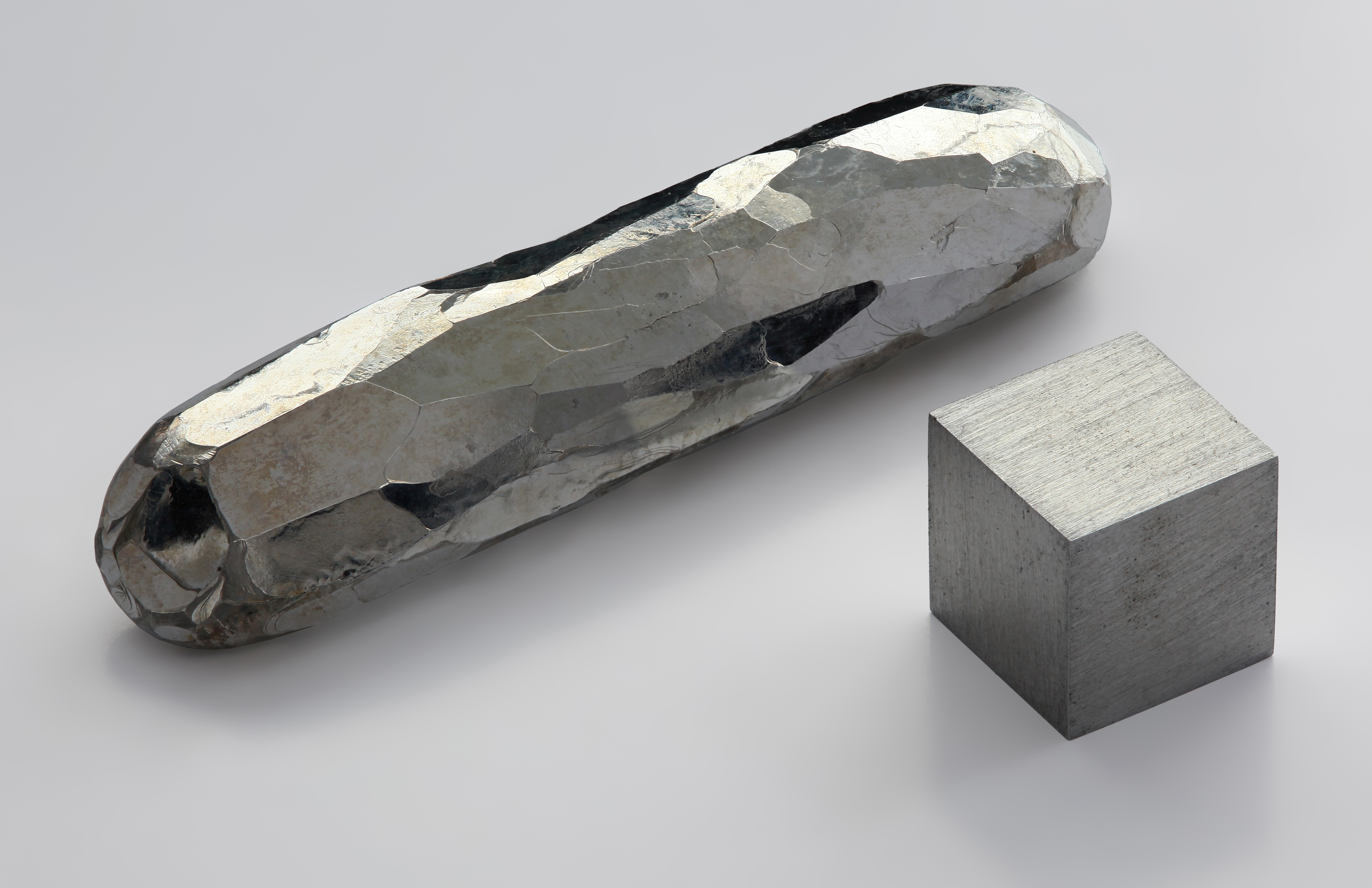
Cadmium was used as a corrosion-resistant plating on steel, with cadmium compounds often used as red, orange, and yellow pigments, to colour glass, and to stabilise plastic

In 2020, the South Australian Environment Protection Authority (EPA) was notified of the presence of per- and polyfluoroalkyl substances (PFAS) in groundwater, soils and sewage sludge in the same vicinity. The EPA notified owners of the affected properties that measures taken to reduce and prevent cadmium exposure will also work to mitigate PFAS exposure.

Sampling of water in the vicinity, including shallow groundwater and lake water, determined that PFAS had contaminated the groundwater. The EPA advised residents to strictly avoid the use of groundwater, and that lake water, tap water and rainwater remain safe.

Testing also confirmed that fish caught from the lake remain fit for human consumption, with PFAS levels low enough to not pose a threat.

== Tidal lake ==
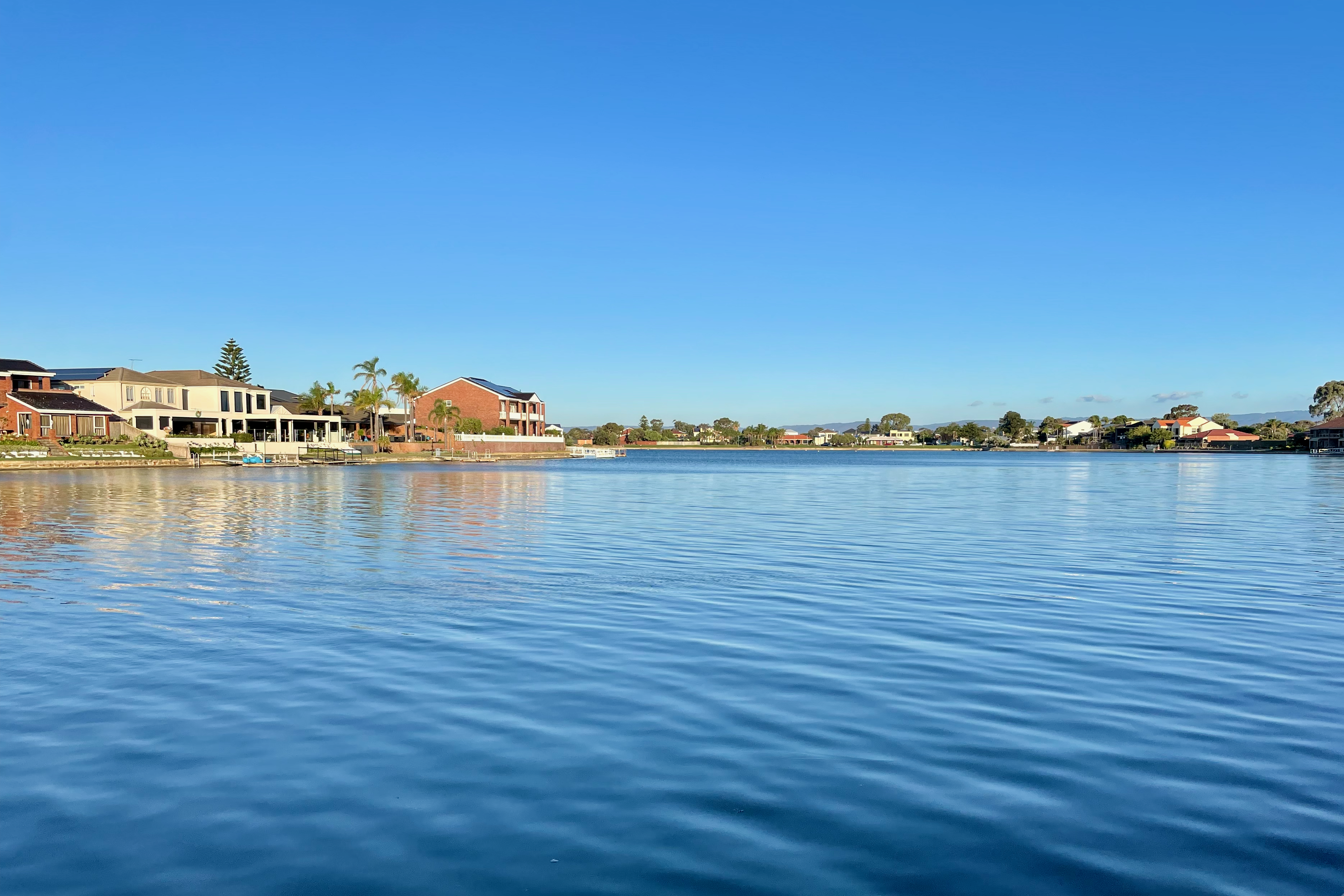
South-eastern part of the tidal lake

The most prominent feature of West Lakes, aside from Delfin Island, is the large saltwater lake. At its southern end, an underground inlet duct runs from Gulf St Vincent at Inlet Reserve, Tennyson Beach into the lake.

At high tide, sea level rises above lake level and fresh seawater is fed into the lake through the underground pipe, where an automatic hydraulic gate opens. At low tide, the gate shuts as the lake reaches its highest level, and at the northern end of the lake, an automatic outlet gate opens allowing water to flow through to the Port River. This system results in approximately 410 megalitres of fresh seawater flushing the lake daily.

The lake began filling in November 1974, in time for the opening of the adjacent Westfield West Lakes shopping centre. The first inflow of ocean water was unscreened, causing a larger and more diverse influx of marine life into the lake. A large stingray was sighted in the lake, which was incorrectly reported to have been a shark. Due to the lake's intended recreational function, which included swimming and diving, larger marine life — such as the stingray — were captured by professional divers and removed.

Today, only smaller marine life is able to flow into the lake from the ocean, with designated fishing spots marked around the lake for recreational fishers.

Due to polluted stormwater runoff into the lake, it's recommended to avoid prolonged contact with the water (e.g. swimming) for 2–3 days after rain.

=== A.M. Ramsay Regatta Course ===
The boating lake was constructed with an international-standard rowing course in mind, and the largely straight and wide southern portion of the lake was reserved for a 2 kilometre rowing course. Today, this is known as the A.M. Ramsay Regatta Course and is host to the annual Head of the River race.

== Delfin Island ==
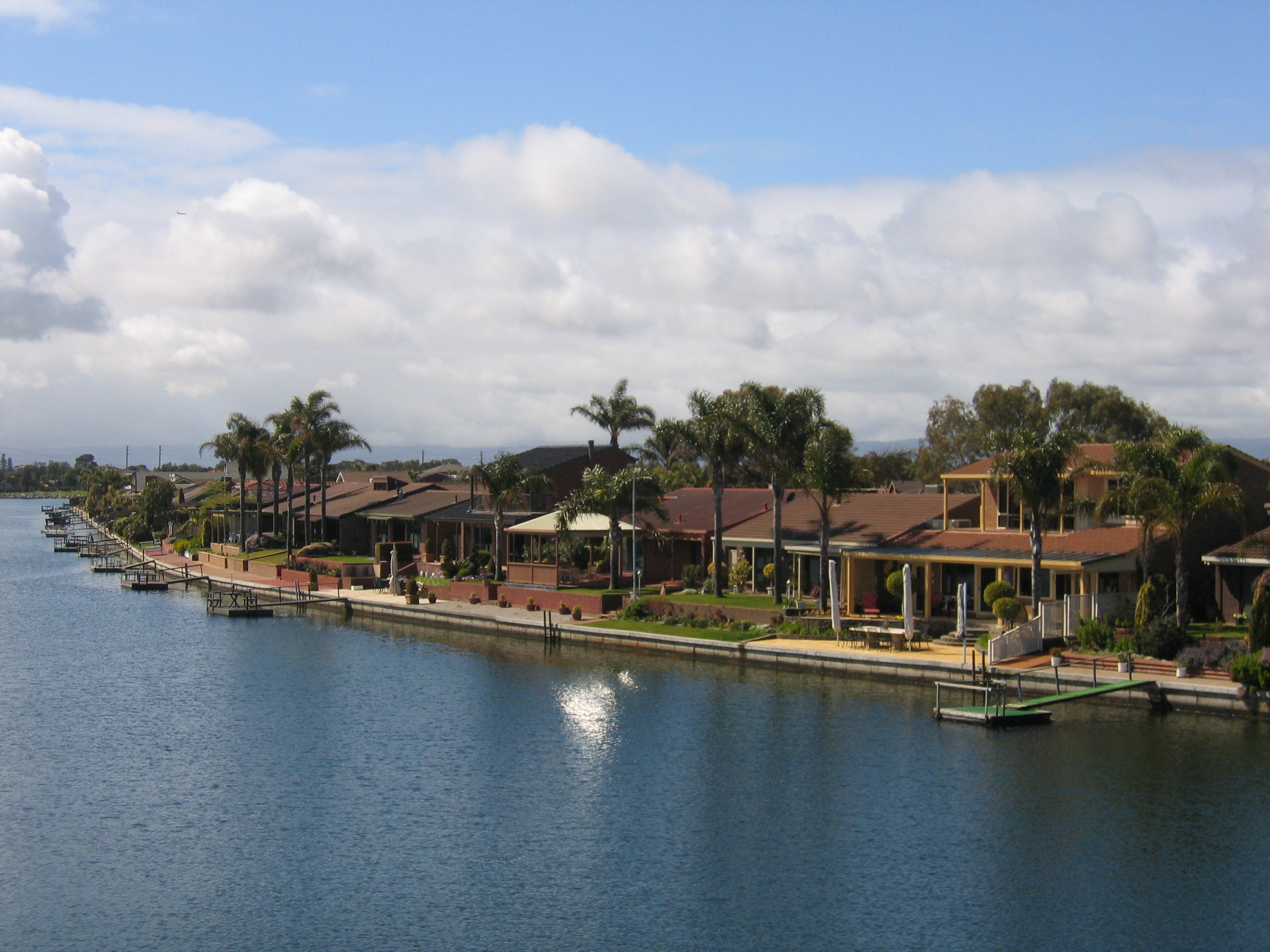
Looking north-east across the tidal lake to Delfin Island

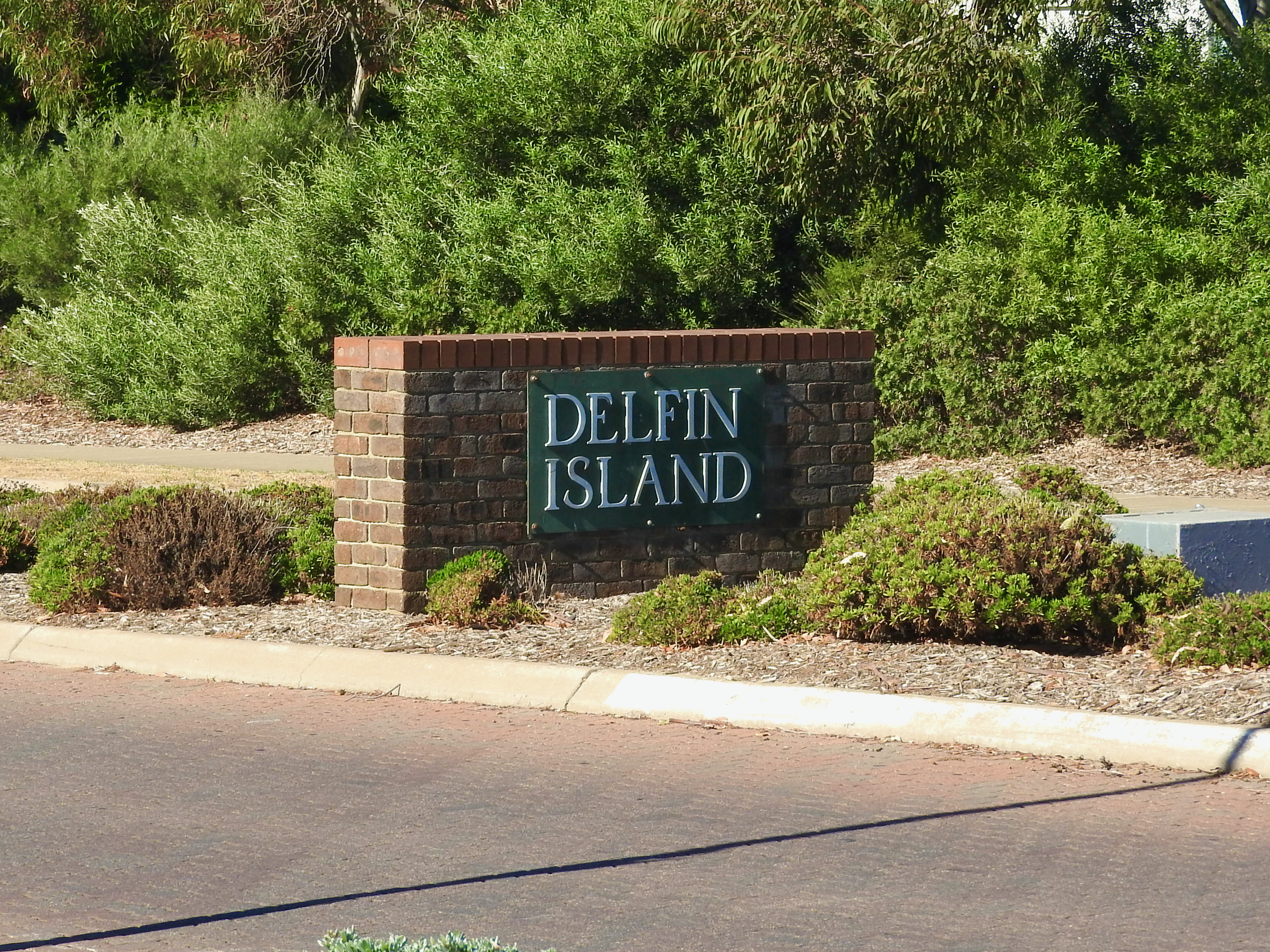
A masonry sign at the entrance of Corcoran Drive from West Lakes Boulevard. Each of the three road entrances feature similar signage.

Officially opened on 17 March 1978 and named after the company that developed West Lakes, Delfin Island is a 106-hectare artificial residential island and remains unique in the context of South Australian urban developments — although man-made residential islands appear in places such as the Gold Coast. Early concept drawings of West Lakes did not explicitly include a residential island.

After initial earthworks and construction formed the island, two additional peninsulas were created through further excavation at the northern and southern tips of the island, resulting in more waterfront allotments. McDonald Grove and Martin Court service the peninsulas at the north and south of Delfin Island, respectively.

Delfin Island is linked to the mainland by a single road — West Lakes Boulevard – in addition to two pedestrian bridges. One on the west of the island links Bartley Terrace with Keppel Grove, and one on the east links Lochside Drive to Kerr Grove and Corcoran Drive.

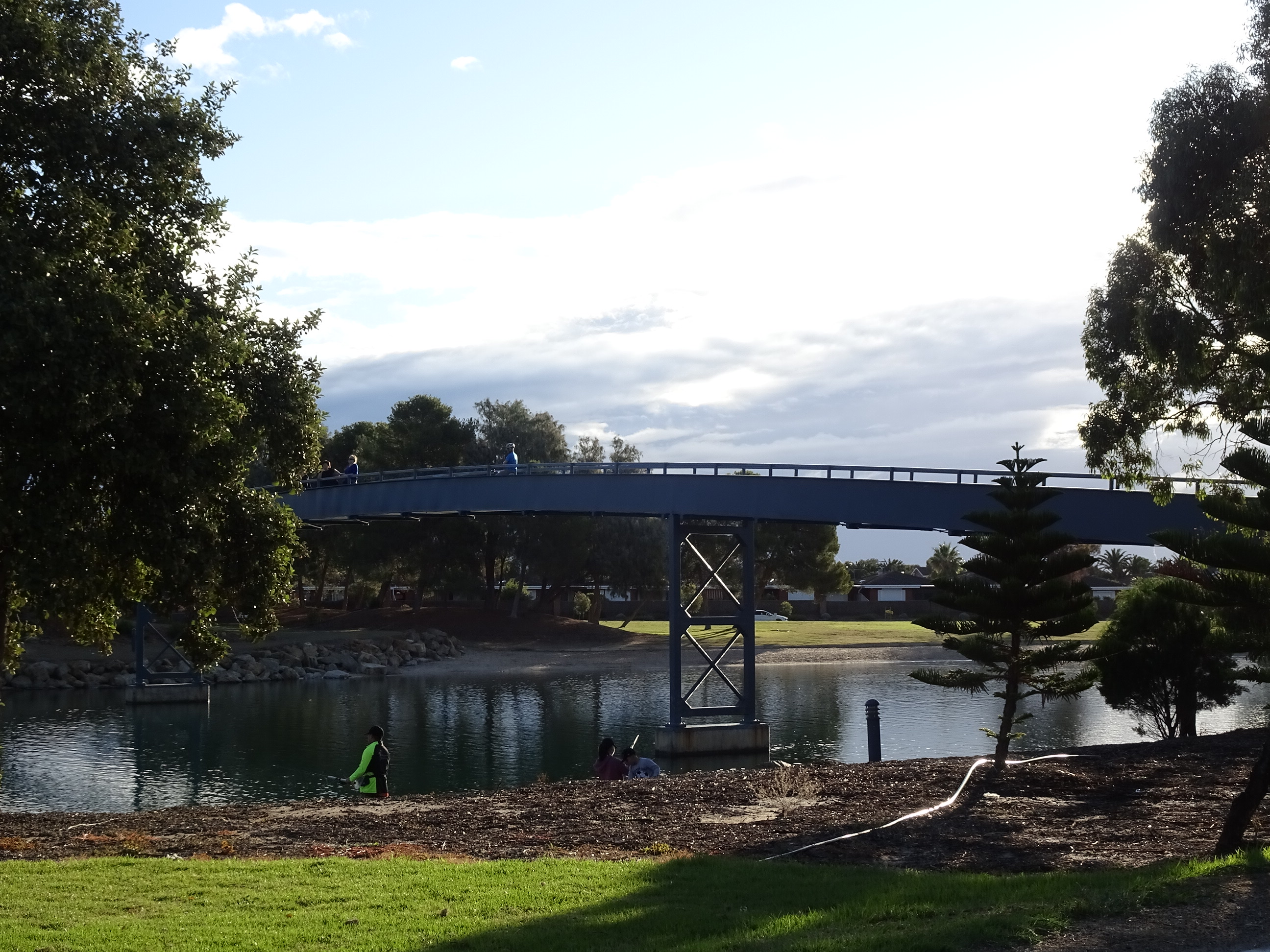
One of the pedestrian bridges linking Delfin Island to the mainland

The Island Point apartment complex, completed in 1990, is prominently situated at the southern end of the island, and was an early pioneer of high-rise suburban apartment living in South Australia.

Freshwater Lake, commonly known as the Delfin Island duck ponds, is also located on the island and occupies about 3 hectares (7.4 acres).

The island consists primarily of quieter cul-de-sacs within distinct "neighbourhoods", where real estate is generally valued higher than in most other areas of West Lakes.

The majority of roadways on the island are named after countries in the Caribbean and Polynesia, as well as other exotic islands such as Corfu and Bali.

== West Lakes Boulevard ==
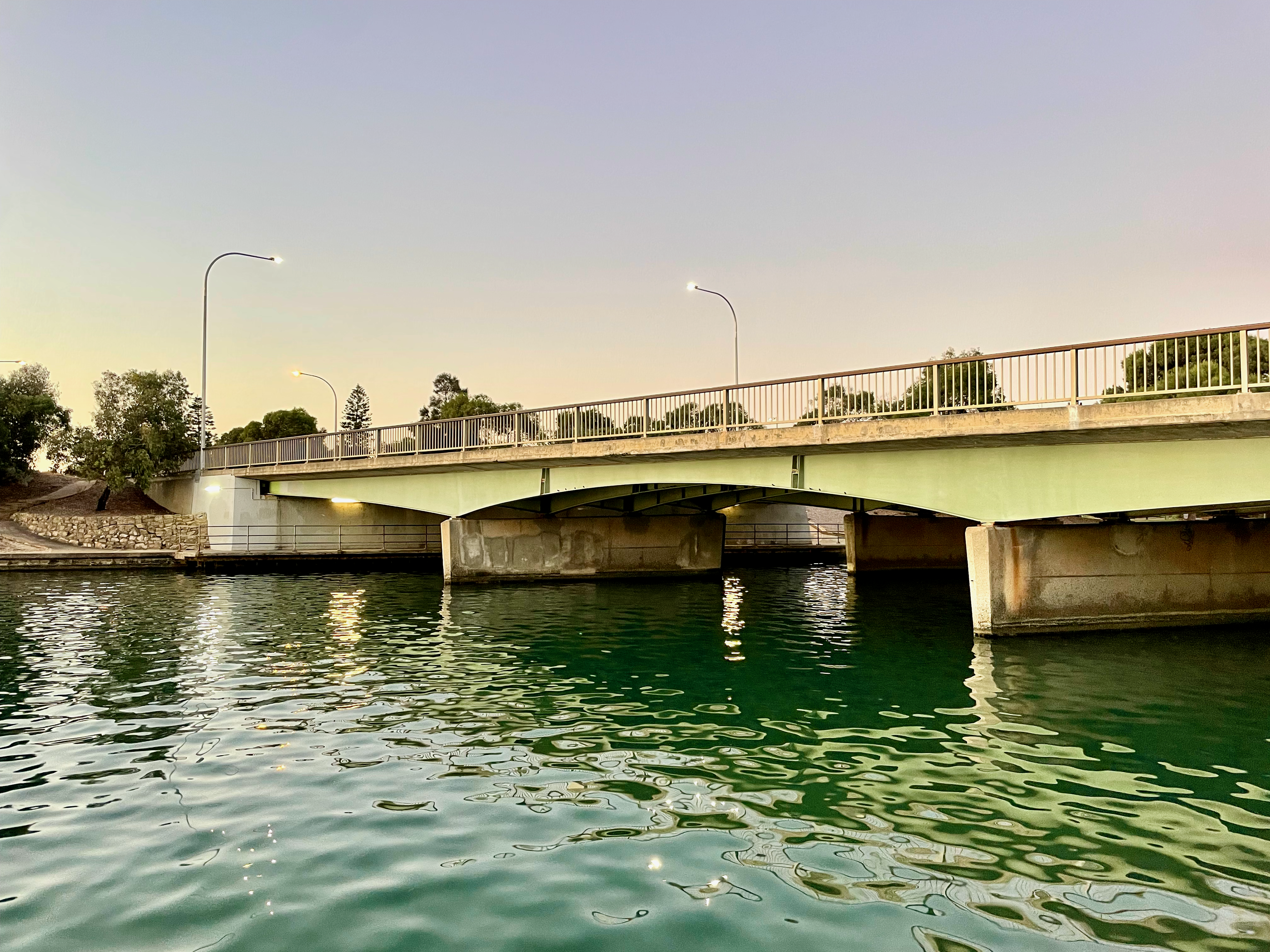
The eastern West Lakes Boulevard bridge, crossing onto Delfin Island (left)

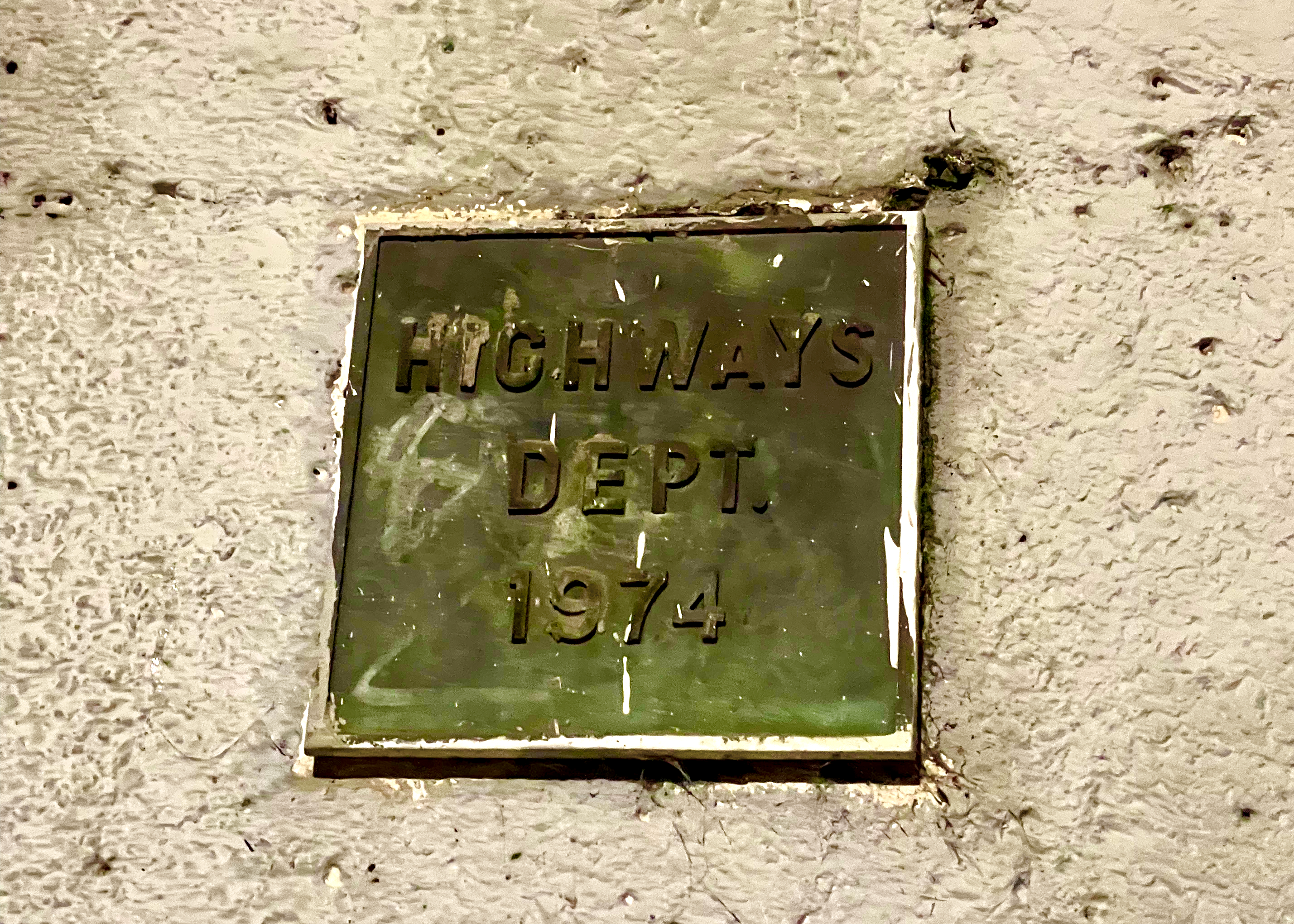
A square, metal plaque affixed to a structural wall of the bridge

West Lakes Boulevard is the primary linking thoroughfare through the development, extending from Port Road in the east through to Military Road in the west.

The thoroughfare was initially planned to cut north-east through the established adjoining suburb Albert Park, however, protests from residents and the local parish resulted in an altered route that utilised (and renamed) part of Clark Terrace parallel to the Grange railway line, as well as the corridor of the former Hendon railway line.

A spur of the Grange railway line was planned to run parallel to West Lakes Boulevard, likely terminating near the Westfield West Lakes shopping centre. This, however, didn't proceed due to financial constraints, and the reserved land was converted into Magarey Grove — a linear tree grove containing 100 spotted gum trees, each dedicated to the first 100 Magarey Medallists.

== Subsequent housing developments ==
=== WEST ===
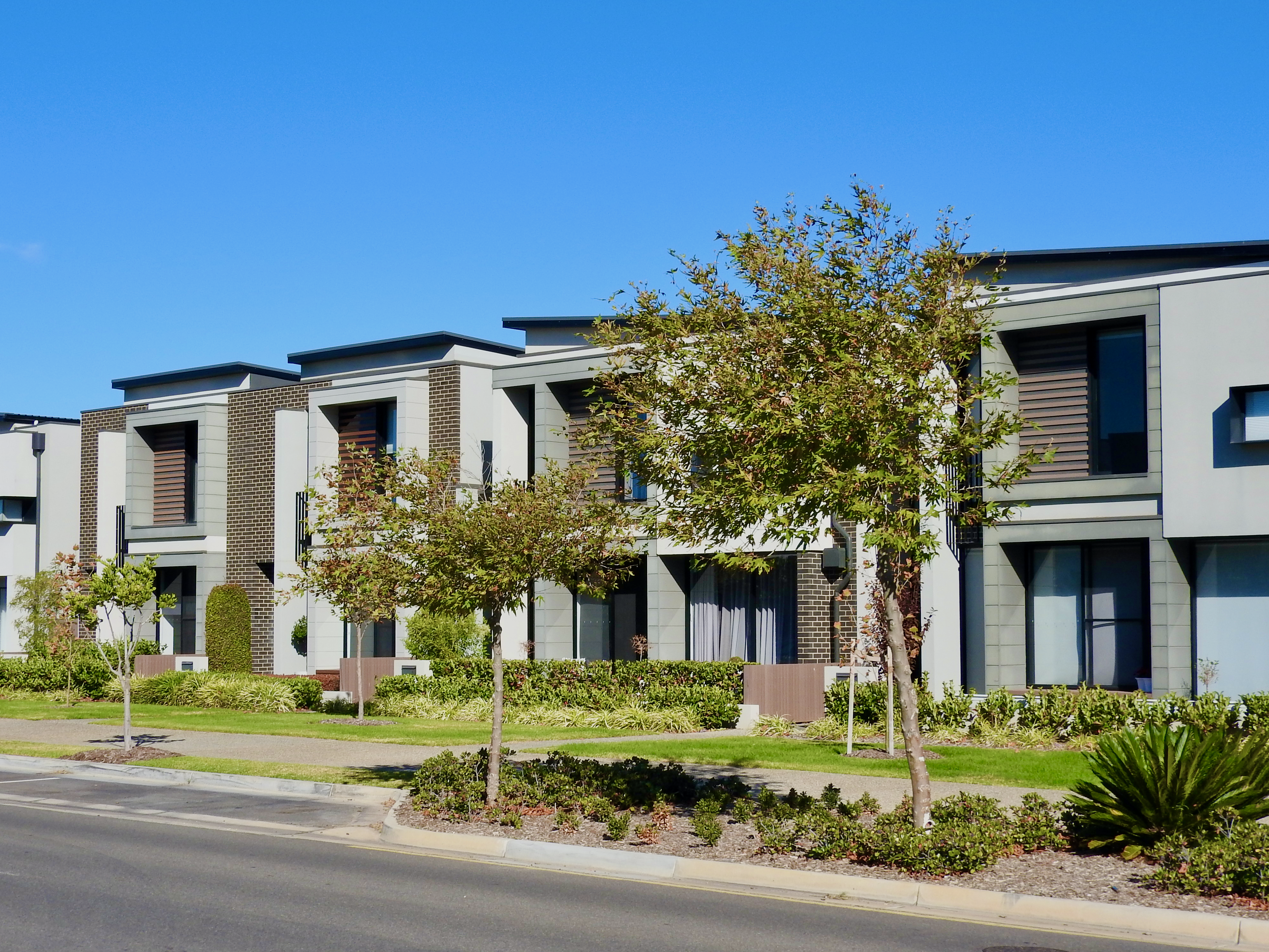
Townhouses within the WEST development along Troubridge Drive. Manicured landscaping and contemporary architecture typify the development

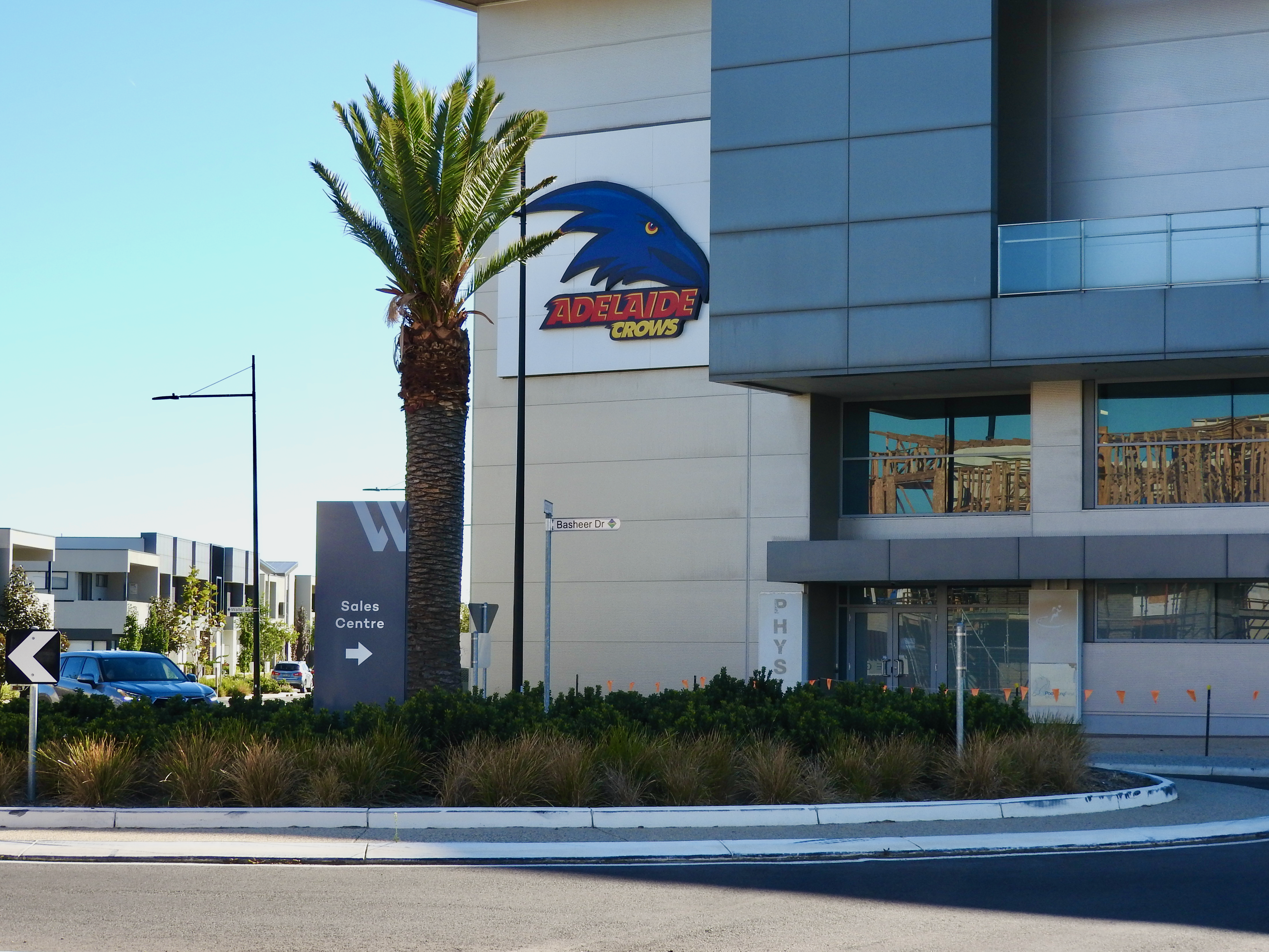
The Adelaide Football Club headquarters and training facility. Formerly part of Football Park, today it sits amongst housing

In 2015, property developer Commercial & General commenced work on a masterplanned, mixed-use subdivision on the former Football Park precinct named "WEST".

The area bounded by Frederick Road, West Lakes Boulevard, Brebner Drive and Football Park — formerly home to the Crows Shed, a large grass oval, and a grandstand — forms the development site.

Housing typology largely consists of townhouses and apartments, deviating from the detached, single-family character of the original West Lakes development. In contrast, it is a much denser urban environment that reflects contemporary urban planning practices — namely, smaller block sizes, functional public reserves, and a dominant presence of attached housing.

The subdivision also features a public library, retail and hospitality precinct, a childcare centre, and an aged care facility.

A small ornamental lake was also constructed as part of the subdivision. Not connected to the aforementioned tidal lake, it relies on mechanical surface aerators for water flow and oxygenation.

To make way for a linear walking trail parallel to the Grange Golf Club, Brebner Drive was rerouted through the subdivision via the newly-formed Troubridge Drive. Doing so retained a largely direct link between Frederick Road and Westfield West Lakes.

=== Novo West Lakes ===
In March 2024, property developer Potentia announced a new housing development on the 17-hectare former Port Adelaide Wastewater Treatment Plant, adjacent to Frederick Road. The area bounded by Frederick Road, the northern boundary of Lochside Drive, the tidal lake, and existing homes on Mariners Crescent, forms the development site.

Almost 500 new homes, in the form of townhouses and apartments, will form the development. One of the two heritage buildings on the site will be converted into a pub, forming part of a broader retail and hospitality "high street" within the development.

The development came about as the result of a major metropolitan land release and rezoning announcement by the state government in January 2024. The former wastewater treatment site was of particular interest for housing due to its relative proximity to the Osborne Naval Shipyard, where submarines for the AUKUS project are slated to be built for the Royal Australian Navy. Delivery of the first submarine is expected in the early 2040s.

== Attractions ==
In addition to Westfield West Lakes, the suburb is also home to the Lakes Resort Hotel (established in 1985) and the West Lakes Golf Club — one of several within the coastal western suburbs.

West Lakes was home to Football Park (also known by its sponsored name AAMI Stadium), which functioned as a 51,240-seat sports stadium where AFL and SANFL games were played. Demolition of the grandstands and light towers were completed in 2019. The oval itself was left intact, and currently serves as the home training ground for the Adelaide Football Club (similar to Waverley Park in Melbourne).

A Douglas C-47 Skytrain military transport aircraft was owned by the McDonald's adjacent to Westfield West Lakes, used as part of a play area for children's parties. The plane was removed in the late 1990s, and is now being restored privately.

== Demographics ==
According to the 2021 Census, the population of the West Lakes census area was 6,768 (2021 Australian census, suburb and locality, 2021).

Approximately 47% of the population was male, and 53% female. West Lakes has a median age of 54, which is 13 years older than the median South Australian age.

Median household weekly income sat at $1,548, and 27% of West Lakes residents had completed tertiary education.

71% of residents were born in Australia, with England (6%), Italy (2%), China (1.7%) and Germany (1.2%) rounding out the top five. 0.9% of West Lakes residents identified as Indigenous Australians.

== Public transport ==
Westfield West Lakes features a bus interchange, whilst the remainder of the suburb is serviced by various Adelaide Metro routes.

- 110 West Lakes Centre Interchange to City
- 112 West Lakes Centre Interchange to City
- 115 West Lakes Centre Interchange to City
- 117 Port Adelaide Interchange to City
- 155 West Lakes Centre Interchange to City
- 157X Largs Bay to City
- 288 West Lakes Centre Interchange to City
- 371 West Lakes Centre Interchange Clockwise Loop
- 372 West Lakes Centre Interchange Anti-Clockwise Loop
- 376 West Lakes Centre Interchange to Delfin Island Anti-Clockwise Loop
- H30 West Lakes Centre Interchange to Paradise Interchange
- H30C West Lakes Centre Interchange/Paradise Interchange to City
- H30C West Lakes Centre Interchange/Paradise Interchange to City
- H30S West Lakes Centre Interchange to Newton
- J7 West Lakes Centre Interchange to Marion Centre Interchange
- J7M West Lakes Centre Interchange / Marion Centre Interchange to Camden Park
- J8 West Lakes Centre Interchange to Marion Centre Interchange
- N30 West Lakes Centre Interchange to City (runs after 11:59pm on Saturdays until Sunday mornings)
- X30 West Lakes Centre Interchange to Paradise Interchange
- X30C West Lakes Centre Interchange to City
- X30S West Lakes Centre Interchange to Newton
- AO18 West Lakes Centre Interchange to Adelaide Oval
