= Birkenhead, South Australia =

Birkenhead
- Suburb
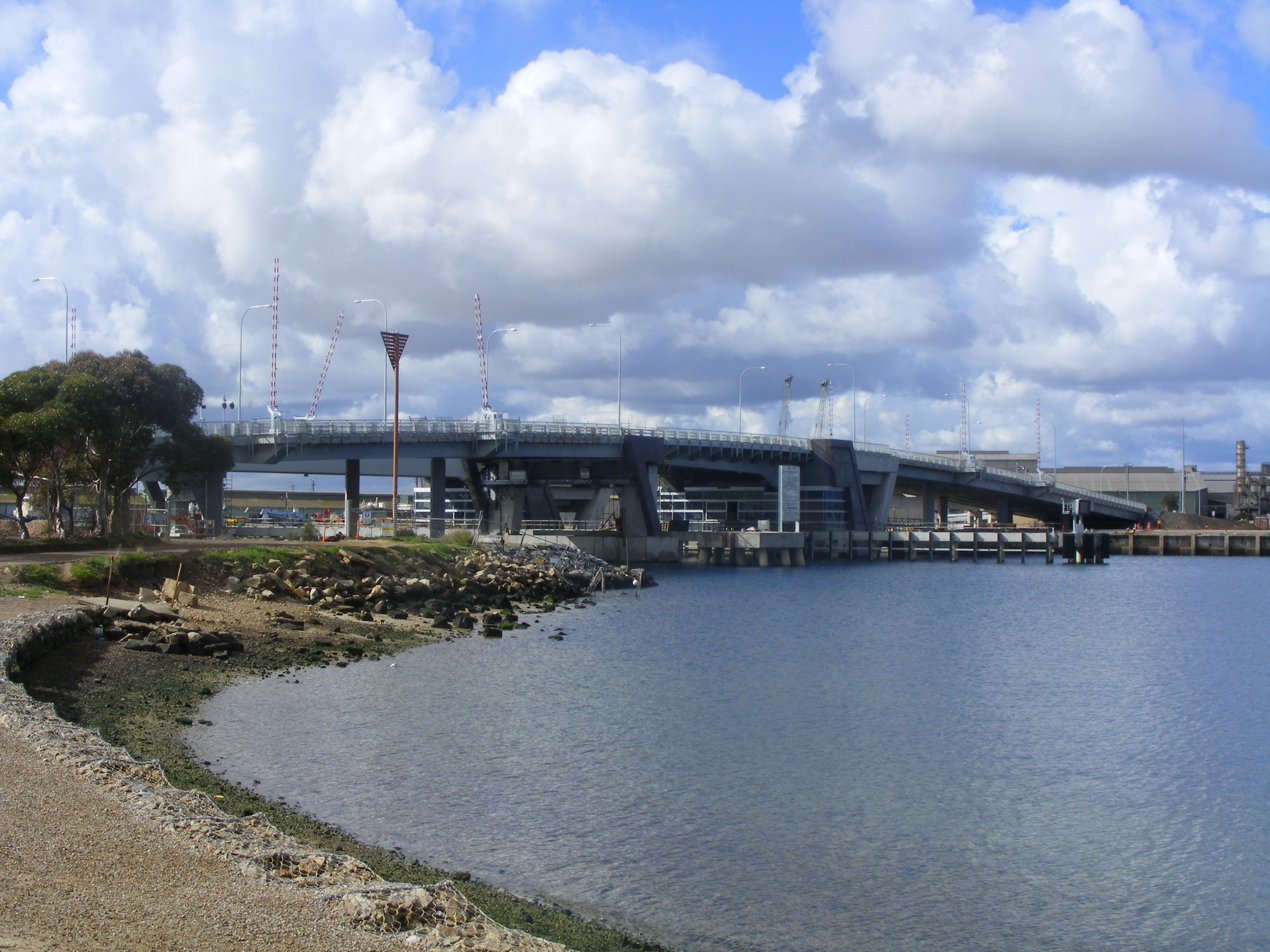
- Tom 'Diver' Derrick Bridge from Birkenhead

- Coordinates: 34.8365°S 138.5°E
- Country: Australia
- State: South Australia
- City: Adelaide
- LGA: City of Port Adelaide Enfield

Government
  - State electorate: Port Adelaide
  - Federal division: Hindmarsh

Population
  - Total: 1,798 (SAL 2021)
- Postcode: 5015
Suburbs around Birkenhead
Largs Bay	Peterhead	Port Adelaide
Exeter	Birkenhead	Port Adelaide
Glanville	New Port	Port Adelaide

Birkenhead is a north-western suburb of Adelaide 14 km from the CBD, on the Lefevre Peninsula, in South Australia, and lies within the City of Port Adelaide Enfield. It is adjacent to Peterhead, Exeter and Glanville. It is bounded to the south by the Gawler Reach of the Port River, to the north by Hargrave Street and in the west and east by the Outer Harbor railway line and the Port River respectively.

It was laid out on section 700, Hundred of Port Adelaide by Thomas Elder and John Hart. Birkenhead Post Office opened around 1884.

Birkenhead is essentially a residential suburb, with industrial harbourside development on the southern and eastern shores of the suburb. It is notable for the Birkenhead Bridge, which formerly opened on a regular basis so that boats could pass along the Port River. It is also the site of a third Port River crossing, the Port River Expressway. It includes the opening Tom 'Diver' Derrick Bridge, designed to ease traffic congestion in the area and opened in August 2008, adjacent to the opening Mary MacKillop Bridge.

The Birkenhead Bridge and the former HMAS Encounter Naval Drill Hall are listed on the South Australian Heritage Register.

== Facilities ==
The suburb is served by a primary school, Lefevre Peninsula Primary School, and the local high school is Lefevre High School, in nearby Semaphore South. There is little commercial activity in the area, as this is plentiful south of the river in Port Adelaide.

The eastern side of the suburb, by the Port riverside is the location of the Adbri cement works, and a berth for the Shell. Its southern shore was formerly the location of a naval yard (now TS Adelaide), the Bureau of Customs, Fletcher's Dock and Fletcher's Slip, DMH Dockyard, the Jenkins Street boatyards and the Port Adelaide Sailing Club, however these have mostly been closed or relocated.

The area was earmarked for residential development as part of the "Newport Quays" redevelopment project, but the site remains vacant (2015) following the loss of development rights by the Newport Quays consortium in 2011.

The former Port Adelaide Sailing Club building, renamed Gallery Yampu, is currently used by the not-for-profit Port Adelaide Artists Forum to host occasional art exhibitions and community events. It also houses Dragon Boat SA.

== Governance ==
Birkenhead is located in the federal division of Hindmarsh, the state electoral district of Port Adelaide and the local government area of the City of Port Adelaide Enfield.

== Transport ==
Adelaide Metro route 150 bus services operate along Semaphore and Fletcher Roads, while routes 352 and 353 serves Semaphore and Fletcher Roads and Hargrave Street. Routes 333 and N254 serve Semaphore Road. The suburb also is serviced by Peterhead railway station on the Outer Harbor railway line.

== Notable residents ==
- A number of Port Adelaide Football Club players were born or have lived in Birkenhead, including dual Magarey Medal and Bob Quinn.
- John Turner (naval officer)

== See also ==
- District Council of Birkenhead
