= Le Fevre Peninsula Primary School =

Primary school in South Australia

Coordinates: 34.8399°S 138.4954°E

- Birkenhead, South Australia; Australia

Information
- Type: Public
- Motto: Accessing Worlds Through Education with Passion, Courage, Commitment and a Sense of Humour
- Established: 1878
- Principal: Robert Bowden
- Enrolment: 238 (2023)
- Campus: Suburban
- Colours: Blue and gold
- Website: http://www.lefevreps.sa.edu.au/

Le Fevre Peninsula Primary School is a public coeducational primary school located in the Adelaide suburb of Birkenhead in South Australia. Since the school's foundation, the name has been spelled in various ways, including Lefevre's, LeFevre's, and Le Fevre's. However, in 1931, the apostrophe was officially dropped, and today the name is commonly referred to as Le Fevre. It is administered by the Department of Education, with an enrolment of 238 students and a teaching staff of 24, as of 2023. The school caters to students from Reception to Year 6.

== History ==
Built on the property of an old school, the current school was designed by Mr. Woods and constructed by Mr. Williams and Cleave at a cost of £2,800, with approximately an additional £300, it was officially opened on Tuesday, 22 January 1878. On its opening day, it had 418 students enrolled, with 404 attending.

== See also ==
- List of schools in South Australia
