= Delfin (Australian company) =

Australian real estate development company

- Formerly: Development Finance Company
- Company type: Subsidiary
- Traded as: ASX: DEL
- Industry: Real estate development
- Founded: 1953
- Founder: Sir John Hedley Douglas Marks
- Defunct: 2011
- Fate: Integrated into Lendlease
- Headquarters: Sydney, Australia
- Key people: Allan McDonald (Chairman); Chris Banks (CEO)
- Website: www.delfin.com.au

Delfin, formerly the Development Finance Company was an Australian business carrying out residential developments. In the 1990s, the company was acknowledged to be the developer of the "best Real Estate project in the world" by International Real Estate Federation and was "widely recognised for innovation in developing quality new urban communities". It initiated a number of major urban developments across Australia before it was acquired by Lendlease in 2001.

== History ==
The company was established as the Development Finance Company by John Marks in 1953. DFC became a public company in 1957 and was listed on the Australian Securities Exchange in 1959. The purpose of DFC was to serve as an "investment banking service" that would "assist Australia’s industrial development by providing long-term finance and permanent capital to Australian companies."

DFC entered the real estate development market in 1969. Via an indenture signed by its subsidiary, Delfin Management Services Pty Ltd and the Government of South Australia, Delfin built a real estate development called West Lakes. West Lakes is in the upper estuary of the Port River, known as the Upper Port Reach, to the north-west of the Adelaide central business district. The success of the project was largely driven by Brian Martin, who was appointed managing director of the business in 1975. This huge development, involving 6,000 houses accommodating 20,000 people, was awarded the inaugural Prix D'Excellence award by FIABCI, the International Real Estate Federation, in 1992. The Federation described this project by Delfin as the "best Real Estate project in the world". At this time, the company was "widely recognised for innovation in developing quality new urban communities".

In 1983, DFC was acquired by the ANZ Bank. ANZ Bank sold the company, now known as Delfin Property Group, to a group of 11 institutional investors in March 1992. The company was relisted on the Australian Securities Exchange in a low-key float later in 1992. After Martin stood down as managing director in 1995, Chris Banks was appointed to the post. Under Banks' leadership the company committed to the A$850 million Mawson Lakes project. Meanwhile, the company repeated its success when the Golden Grove development, involving 3,000 houses accommodating 10,000 people, was the winner of the Prix d'Excellence for the most outstanding international residential development for 1998.

Delfin Property Group was acquired by Lendlease for $172 million in 2001. Upon acquisition, Delfin Property Group was delisted from the Australian Securities Exchange and became Delfin Lend Lease. The company continued to make an impact in the 21st century and, in 2007, remained Australia's largest developer of master-planned communities, with 21 projects across Australia. The company won the national award for best master-planned development from the Urban Development Institute of Australia for the Varsity Lakes development, involving 3,000 houses accommodating 8,000 people, in 2011. Lendlease ceased using the Delfin brand and the real estate development business was fully integrated into Lendlease in around 2011.

== Urban developments ==
DFC initiated a number of major urban developments across Australia in the latter half of the 20th century, and into the 21st century. These included:

- West Lakes (1970)
- Golden Grove (1984)
- Rosewood (1992)
- Mawson Lakes (1998)
- Varsity Lakes (2007)
- Blakes Crossing (2009)
- Springwood (2010)

== Awards ==
Awards won by the company include:

- Prix D'Excellence award from FIABCI, the International Real Estate Federation, in 1992
- Prix D'Excellence award from FIABCI, the International Real Estate Federation, in 1998
- Best Masterplanned Community award from the Urban Development Institute of Australia in 1999
- Environmental Excellence Award from the Urban Development Institute of Australia in 2001
- President's Award from the Urban Development Institute of Australia in 2001
- Best Masterplanned Community award from the Urban Development Institute of Australia in 2002
- Best Masterplanned Community award from the Urban Development Institute of Australia in 2003
- Best Masterplanned Community award from the Urban Development Institute of Australia in 2004
- Best Masterplanned Community award from the Urban Development Institute of Australia in 2006
- Best Masterplanned Community award from the Urban Development Institute of Australia in 2011

== Legacy ==
Delfin Island, which is named after the developer, was officially opened by the Premier of South Australia, Don Dunstan, on 17 March 1978. The island, which was part of a mosquito-ridden swamp before being developed by the company, is now a prestigious residential community.
