= Glanville, South Australia =

Glanville
- Suburb
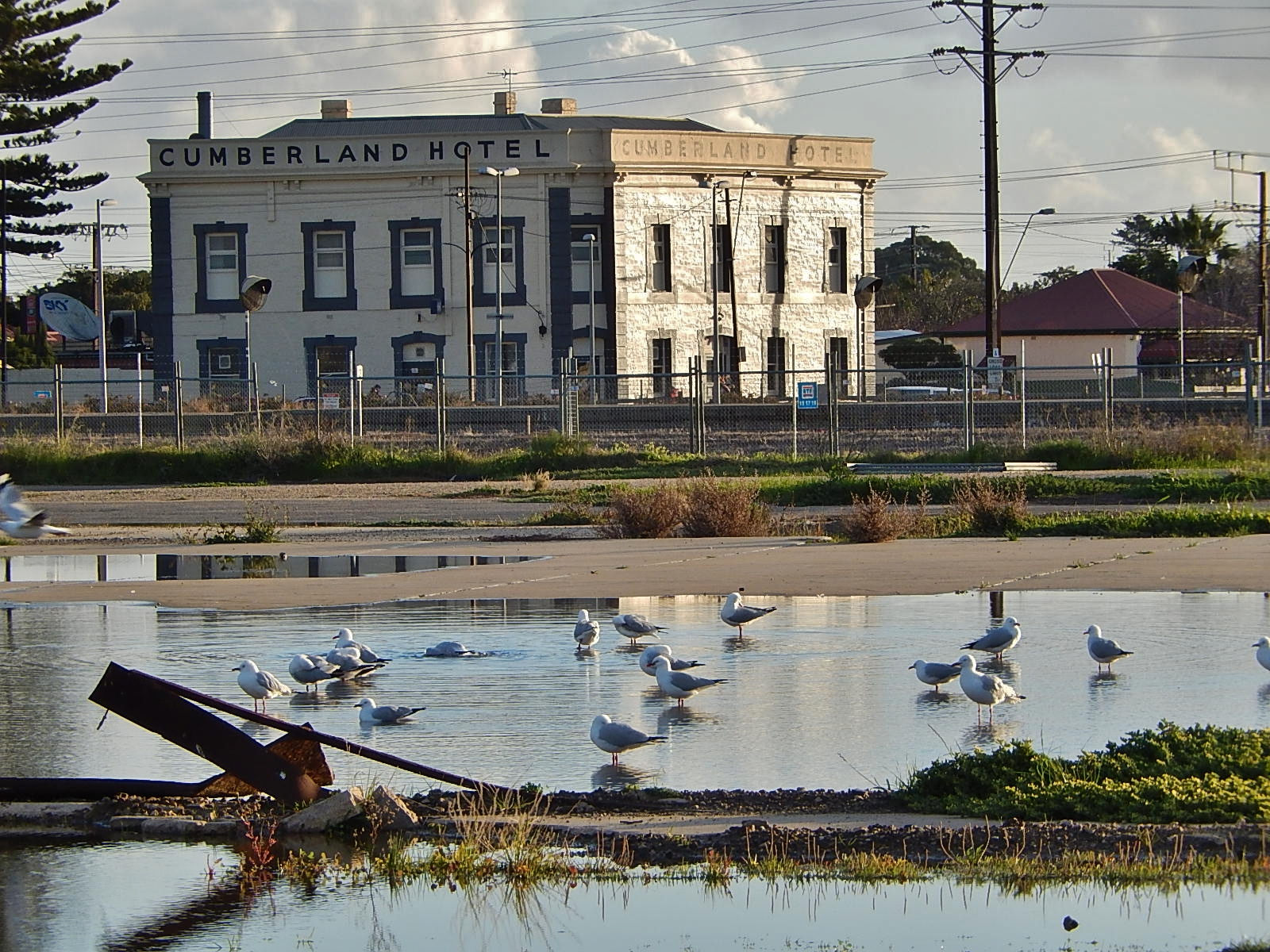

- Coordinates: 34.84°S 138.49°E
- Country: Australia
- State: South Australia
- City: Adelaide
- LGA: City of Port Adelaide Enfield
- Location: 12 km (7.5 mi) NW of Adelaide
- Established: 1951

Government
  - State electorate: Port Adelaide
  - Federal division: Hindmarsh
- Elevation: 5 m (16 ft)

Population
  - Total: 728 (SAL 2021)
- Postcode: 5015
Suburbs around Glanville
Semaphore	Exeter	Birkenhead
Semaphore	Glanville	Port Adelaide
Semaphore South	Ethelton	Ethelton

Glanville is a north western suburb of Adelaide, in the City of Port Adelaide Enfield.

== History ==
In 1846 Captain John Hart settled near Port Adelaide on a private subdivision of section 908 of the Hundred of Port Adelaide. Hart's permanent residence was built on the subdivision in 1856. Hart named the residence Glanville Hall for his mother, Mary née Glanville, and the land division was known as Glanville Hall Estate. The suburb of Glanville was formally established on a portion of the Glanville Hall Estate subdivision in 1951 after the name was proposed in 1945.

== See also ==
- Glanville railway station
- District Council of Glanville
