= Semaphore South, South Australia =

Semaphore South
- Suburb
- Interactive map of Semaphore South
- Coordinates: 34.84715312445578°S 138.48079726604882°E
- Country: Australia
- State: South Australia
- LGA: City of Port Adelaide Enfield
- Location: 15 km (9.3 mi) NW of Adelaide CBD
- Established: 1945

Government
  - State electorate: Lee
  - Federal division: Hindmarsh
- Elevation: 11 m (36 ft)

Population
  - Total: 1,031 (SAL 2021)
- Postcode: 5019
Suburbs around Semaphore South
Gulf St Vincent	Semaphore	Glanville
Gulf St Vincent	Semaphore South	Ethelton
Gulf St Vincent	Semaphore Park	Semaphore Park
- Coordinates; Adjoining localities

Semaphore South is a beachside suburb of Adelaide, in the City of Port Adelaide Enfield.

The Semaphore South Post Office opened on 3 November 1947 and closed in 1978.

Semaphore South is located in the state electoral district of Lee and the federal division of Hindmarsh.

Le Fevre High School, originally spelt LeFevre, is located in the suburb, and is the oldest secondary school in the area. Although the site has earlier origins as a school, it was officially gazetted in 1910.
