= Alberton railway station, Adelaide =

Railway station in Adelaide, South Australia

Alberton
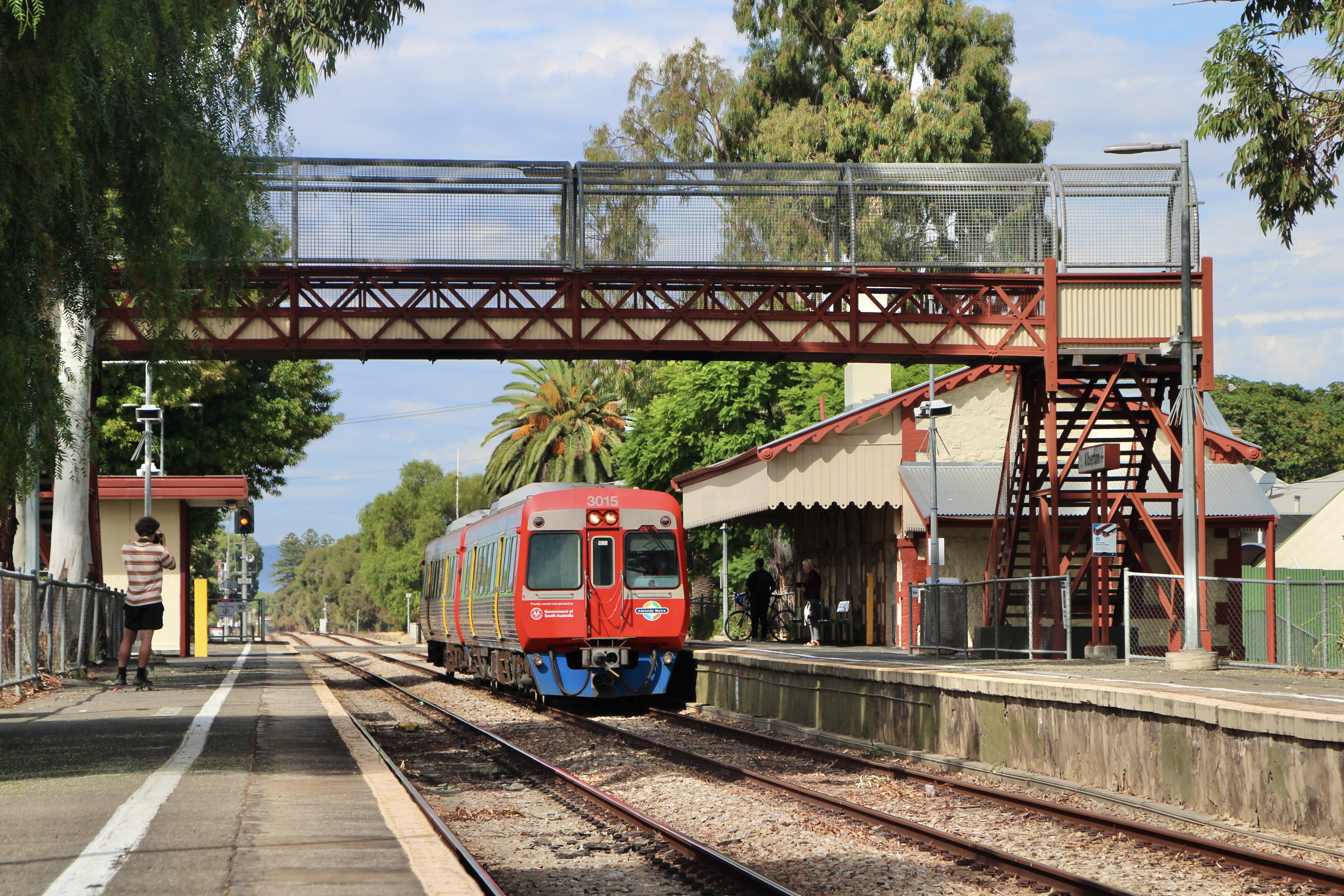
- South-east bound view, with a set of 3000 class railcars arriving at Platform 1 on a service to Outer Harbor, April 2025

General information
- Location: Station Place, Alberton
- Coordinates: 34°51′29″S 138°31′06″E
- Owner: Department for Infrastructure & Transport
- Operator: Adelaide Metro
- Line: Outer Harbor Port Dock
- Distance: 10.2 km from Adelaide
- Platforms: 2
- Tracks: 2
- Bus routes: 232 to Port Adelaide (Torrens Road)
- Connections: Bus

Construction
- Structure type: Side platform
- Parking: No
- Cycle facilities: Yes
- Accessible: Yes

Other information
- Station code: 16492 (to City); 18463 (to Outer Harbor & Port Dock)
- Website: Adelaide Metro

History
- Opened: 1856

Services
Preceding station	Adelaide Metro	Following station
Cheltenham towards Adelaide	Outer Harbor line	Port Adelaide towards Osborne or Outer Harbor
St Clair towards Adelaide	Outer Harbor line Express	Port Adelaide towards Osborne or Outer Harbor
Cheltenham towards Adelaide	Port Dock line	Port Dock Terminus
Location

Alberton railway station is the junction station for the Outer Harbor and Port Dock lines. Situated in the north-western Adelaide suburb of Alberton, it is 10.2 kilometres from Adelaide station. The station is listed on the South Australian Heritage Register and its heritage building on the west platform is the oldest one for a station still in operation in Australia.

== History ==
The railway station and the substantial brick and stone building on the northbound platform were constructed in 1856 when the line between Adelaide and Port Adelaide was built. The other intermediate stations on this line were at Bowden and Woodville. In the early days, Adelaide to Port Adelaide was a single-track railway. As traffic on the line increased, a second platform opened at Alberton in 1878 and the single track was duplicated throughout in 1881. Goods sidings were installed in 1892, controlled by a signal cabin adjacent to the Fussell Place level crossing.

As traffic declined in the second half of the 20th century, the goods siding and signal cabin were taken out of use in 1953. Alberton station has been unattended since 1 September 1987, but the heritage building on the west platform was used as a shop and hairdresser until 2019. In late 2016, the station was ranked as one of the worst stations in the western suburbs based on 5 criteria. On 17 May 2022, a 62 year old woman was fatally struck by a train at a crossing north of the station, causing the line to be closed for several hours and promoting calls for more gates at crossings along the Outer Harbor line.

No freight trains operate through Alberton, however a significant amount of freight traffic used the nearby Rosewater loop until 2008 when the Mary MacKillop Bridge over the Port River was opened. The Rosewater loop joined the Adelaide to Outer Harbor line at Port Adelaide Junction (just north of Alberton) heading for the Lefevre Peninsula and Pelican Point.

Restoration works were undertaken for the west platform's heritage building in 2026, in celebration of the station's 170th anniversary.

== Services by platform ==
Platform	Lines	Destinations	Notes
1	Outer Harbor	all stops services to Outer Harbor	some peak hour services terminate at Osborne
1	Port Dock	all stops services to Port Dock	
2	Outer Harbor	all stops services to Adelaide	
2	Port Dock	all stops services to Adelaide	
