= Cheltenham Racecourse railway station, Adelaide =

Former railway station in South Australia, Australia

Coordinates: 34°52′11″S 138°31′43″E

Cheltenham Racecourse
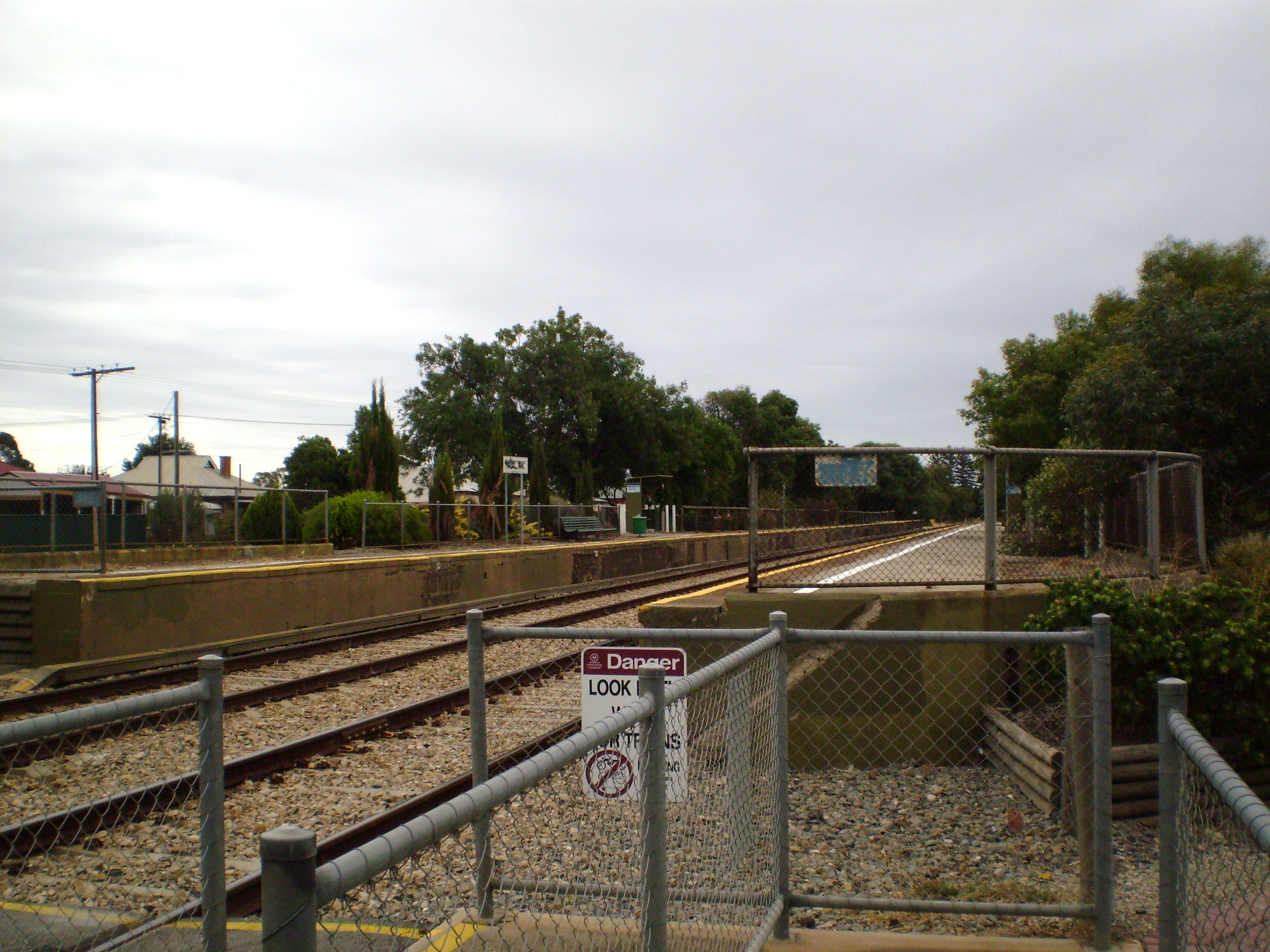

General information
- Location: Cheltenham Parade; Cheltenham
- Line: Outer Harbor line
- Distance: 8.7 km from Adelaide
- Platforms: 2
- Bus routes: n/a

Construction
- Parking: No
- Cycle facilities: No

History
- Opened: 1895
- Closed: 21 February 2009, demolished June 2012
- Rebuilt: 1959

Services
Preceding station	TransAdelaide	Following station
Woodville towards Adelaide	Outer Harbor line	Cheltenham towards Osborne or Outer Harbor
Location

Cheltenham Racecourse railway station was located on the Outer Harbor line, serving Cheltenham Park Racecourse in Adelaide.

== History ==
The station opened in 1895 as Cheltenham, serving both rail passengers and race-goers. In the early 1910s a siding with a step-down platform was provided east of Cheltenham Parade to provide direct access to the racecourse. This siding was used on race days only and closed a few decades later. In 1959, an island-platform station opened 500 metres outbound from the original station and was named Cheltenham. The original station was renamed Cheltenham Racecourse, and was restricted to raceday services only.

On 21 February 2009, Cheltenham Park Racecourse closed to make way for new housing developments, and in June 2012, the station was demolished. With the development of the suburb of St Clair on the former racecourse site, construction of St Clair station began in June 2013, with the station opening on 23 February 2014.
