= St Clair railway station =

Railway station in Adelaide, South Australia

St Clair
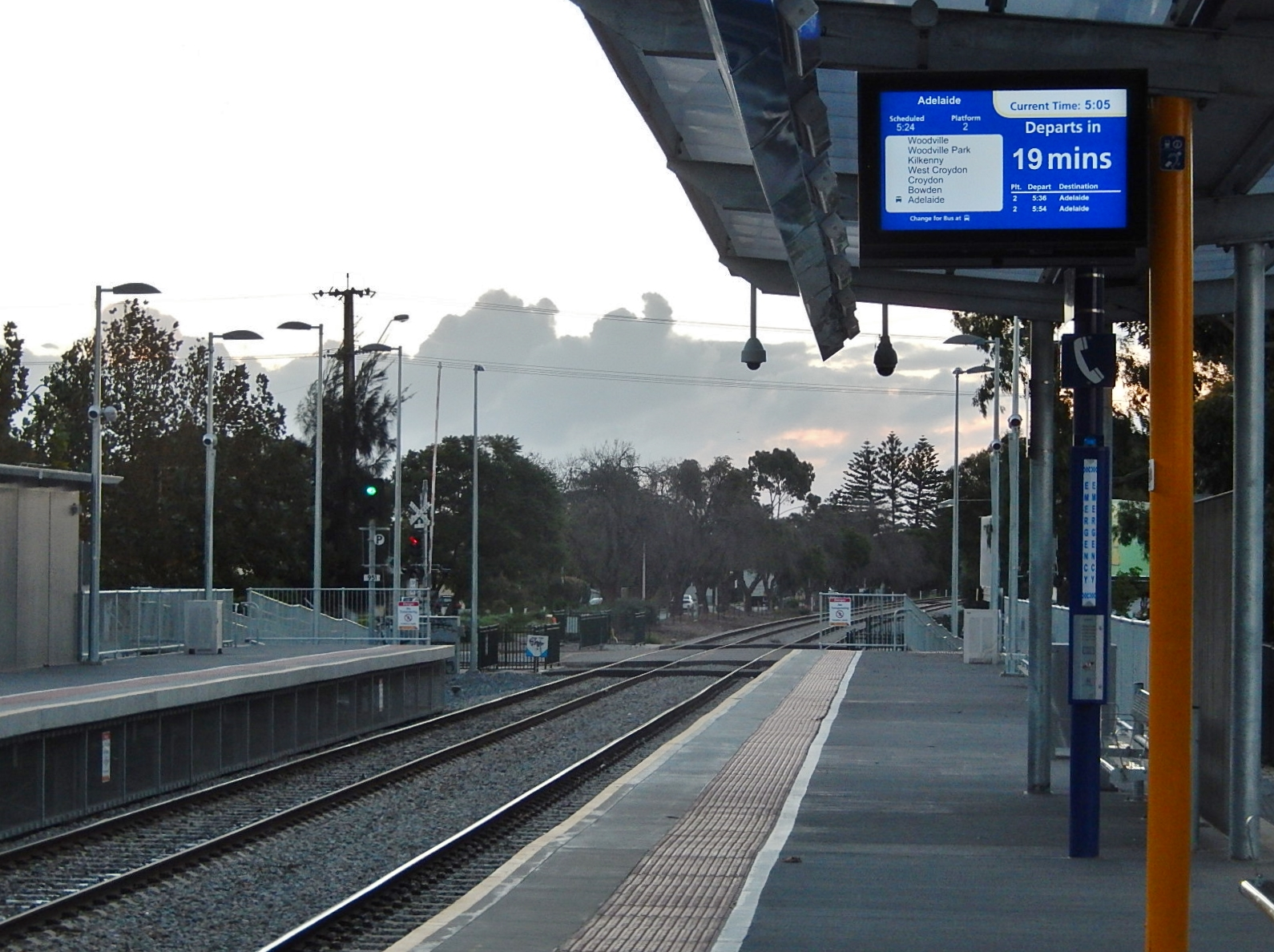
- North-west bound view from Platform 2, May 2014. The site of the former Cheltenham Racecourse station, which St Clair replaced, can be seen in the background.

General information
- Location: Cheltenham Parade, Cheltenham
- Coordinates: 34°51′58″S 138°31′29″E
- Owner: Department for Infrastructure & Transport
- Operator: Adelaide Metro
- Line: Outer Harbor Port Dock
- Distance: 8.6 km from Adelaide
- Platforms: 2
- Tracks: 2
- Connections: Bus

Construction
- Structure type: Side platform
- Parking: No
- Cycle facilities: No
- Accessible: Yes

Other information
- Station code: 18683 (to City); 18684 (to Outer Harbor & Port Dock)
- Website: Adelaide Metro

History
- Opened: 23 February 2014

Services
Preceding station	Adelaide Metro	Following station
Woodville towards Adelaide	Outer Harbor line	Cheltenham towards Osborne or Outer Harbor
Woodville towards Adelaide	Outer Harbor line Express	Alberton towards Osborne or Outer Harbor
Woodville towards Adelaide	Port Dock line	Cheltenham towards Port Dock
Location

St Clair railway station is located on the Outer Harbor and Port Dock lines in South Australia. Situated in the north-western Adelaide suburb of Cheltenham, it is 8.6 kilometres from Adelaide station.

== History ==
Construction of St Clair station began in June 2013, with the station opening on 23 February 2014. It is the official replacement for the Cheltenham Racecourse railway station, which closed in 2009 and was later demolished.

In late 2016, the station was ranked as one of the best stations in the western suburbs based on 5 criteria. The reasons cited included: "Very clean, fine paintwork, no graffiti and no smell. Area well landscaped."

== Services by platform ==
Platform	Lines	Destinations	Notes
1	Outer Harbor	all stops services to Outer Harbor	some peak hour services terminate at Osborne
1	Port Dock	all stops services to Port Dock	
2	Outer Harbor	all stops services to Adelaide	
2	Port Dock	all stops services to Adelaide	

== Transport links ==
Bus transfers: Stop 29C (Cheltenham Parade)
Route no.	Destination & route details
J8	Marion via West Lakes, Arndale, Adelaide Airport & Marion Rd
J8	West Lakes via Marion Interchange, Marion Rd, Adelaide Airport & Arndale
