= Cheltenham railway station, Adelaide =

Railway station in Adelaide, South Australia

Cheltenham
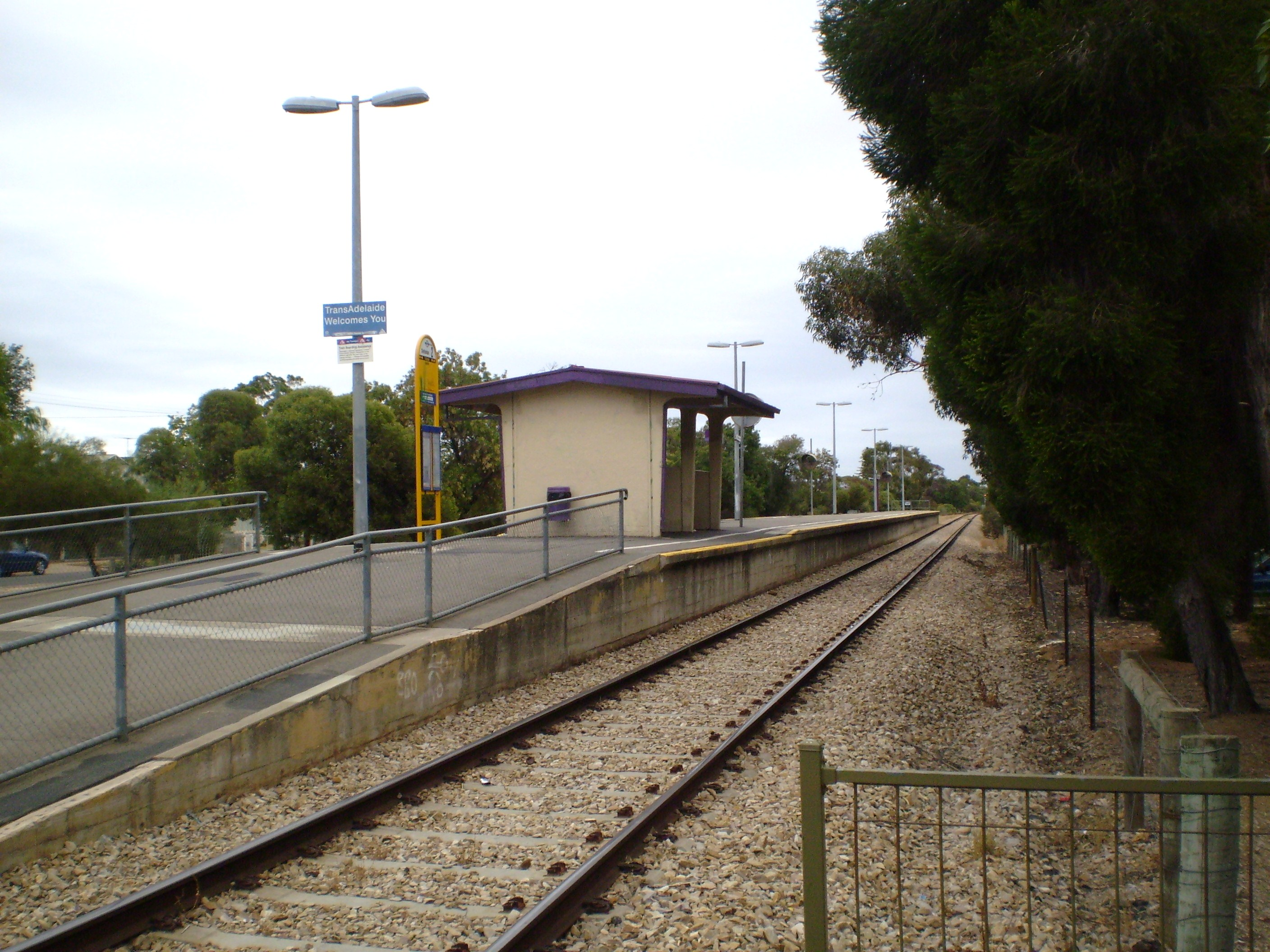
- North-west bound view of Platform 1, February 2008

General information
- Location: Railway Terrace, Cheltenham
- Coordinates: 34°51′58″S 138°31′29″E
- Owner: Department for Infrastructure & Transport
- Operator: Adelaide Metro
- Line: Outer Harbor Port Dock
- Distance: 9.2 km (5.7 mi) from Adelaide
- Platforms: 2
- Tracks: 2
- Connections: None

Construction
- Structure type: Ground; Island platform
- Parking: No
- Cycle facilities: No
- Accessible: Yes

Other information
- Station code: 16499 (to City); 18461 (to Outer Harbor & Port Dock)
- Website: Adelaide Metro

History
- Opened: 1959

Services
Preceding station	Adelaide Metro	Following station
St Clair towards Adelaide	Outer Harbor line	Alberton towards Osborne or Outer Harbor
St Clair towards Adelaide	Port Dock line	Alberton towards Port Dock
Location

Cheltenham railway station is located on the Outer Harbor and Port Dock lines. Situated in the north-western Adelaide suburb of Cheltenham, it is 9.2 kilometres (5.7 mi) from Adelaide station.

== History ==
Cheltenham station opened in 1959. It originally had a ticket office and toilets either side of the current shelter, but they closed in 1986. The facilities were demolished shortly afterwards. In late 2016, the station was ranked as one of the worst stations in the western suburbs based on 5 criteria.

Originally, all regular services stopped at Cheltenham station, but since 25 August 2024, only services to Port Dock and Osborne stop at Cheltenham, with most Outer Harbor trains bypassing it.

The station shelter and seatings were replaced in 2017.

== Services by platform ==
Platform	Lines	Destinations	Notes
1	Outer Harbor	limited stops services to Outer Harbor	some peak hour services terminate at Osborne
1	Port Dock	all stops services to Port Dock	
2	Outer Harbor	limited stops services to Adelaide	
2	Port Dock	all stops services to Adelaide	
