= Rosewater railway station =

Railway station in Adelaide, Australia from 1916 to 1988

Coordinates: 34°51′13″S 138°31′14″E

Rosewater

General information
- Location: Canning Street; Rosewater
- Line: Dry Creek-Port Adelaide
- Distance: 7.0 km from Dry Creek
- Platforms: removed
- Bus routes: none

Construction
- Parking: n/a
- Cycle facilities: n/a

History
- Opened: 1916
- Closed: 1988
- Rebuilt: unknown

Services
Preceding station	TransAdelaide	Following station
Grand Junction Road, Adelaide towards Dry Creek	Dry Creek–Port Adelaide line	Port Dock Terminus
Location

Rosewater railway station was a railway station located in the northwestern Adelaide suburb of Rosewater. The station was right next to the Eric Sutton Oval, and was located about 7 km from Dry Creek station on the Dry Creek to Port Adelaide line.

== History ==
The station opened in 1916, along with the Rosewater Loop (itself constructed circa 1915 to allievate cargo congestion coming from Port Adelaide).

The station consisted merely of a shelter and a 2-metre-long step-down platform. When the Dry Creek to Port Adelaide line closed to passengers on 29 May 1988, Rosewater was one of two stations to operate until the line's closure (the other being Junction Road station), because the stations east of Junction Road station closed in 1987. The platform and shelter were removed shortly after, and there is no evidence of the station left.

The area is proposed for conversion into a green open community space with a rail trail.

== See also ==
- Dry Creek-Port Adelaide railway
- List of closed Adelaide railway stations
