= Mary MacKillop Bridge =

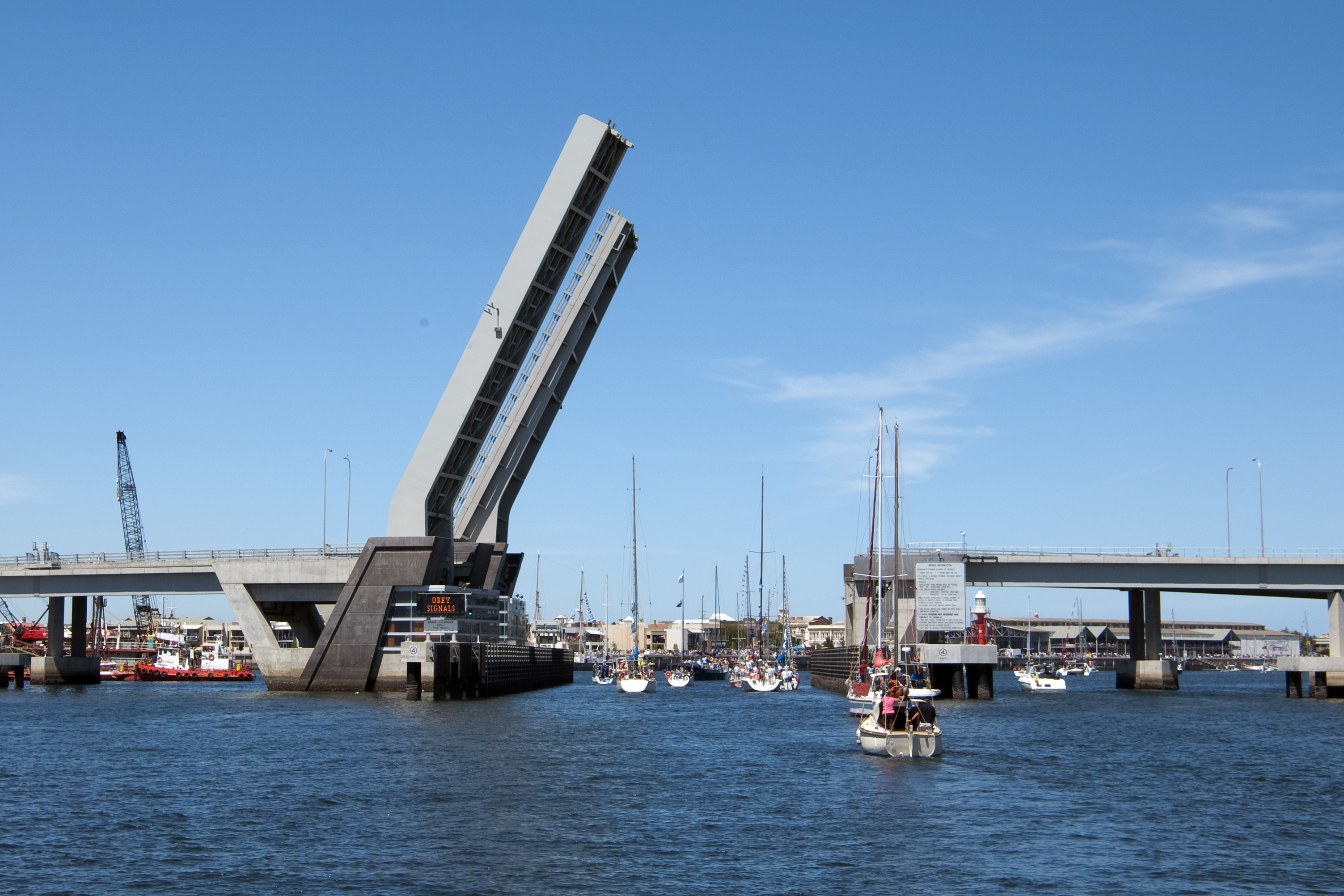
- Mary MacKillop Bridge with Tom 'Diver' Derrick Bridge in the background in February 2010
- Coordinates: 34°50′18″S 138°30′25″E
- Carries: Dry Creek-Port Adelaide railway line
- Crosses: Port River
- Locale: Lefevre Peninsula
- Named for: Mary MacKillop
- Owner: Department of Planning, Transport & Infrastructure
- Followed by: Tom 'Diver' Derrick Bridge

Characteristics
- Design: Bascule
- Total length: 770 metres

Rail characteristics
- No. of tracks: 1
- Track gauge: 1,435 mm (56.5 in); 1,600 mm (63 in)

History
- Constructed by: Abigroup
- Opened: 1 August 2008

The Mary MacKillop Bridge is a bascule bridge in Adelaide, Australia that carries the Dry Creek-Port Adelaide railway line over the Port River.

In July 2005, Abigroup was awarded a contract to build a railway bridge and the adjoining Tom 'Diver' Derrick Bridge to carry the Port River Expressway over the Port River. The bridge was built as part of a project to divert the Dry Creek-Port Adelaide line away from the Rosewater loop and bypass the suburban network.

It was opened on 1 August 2008 by Premier Mike Rann.
