= Dry Creek-Port Adelaide railway line =

Railway line in Adelaide, South Australia

Dry Creek–Port Adelaide railway line
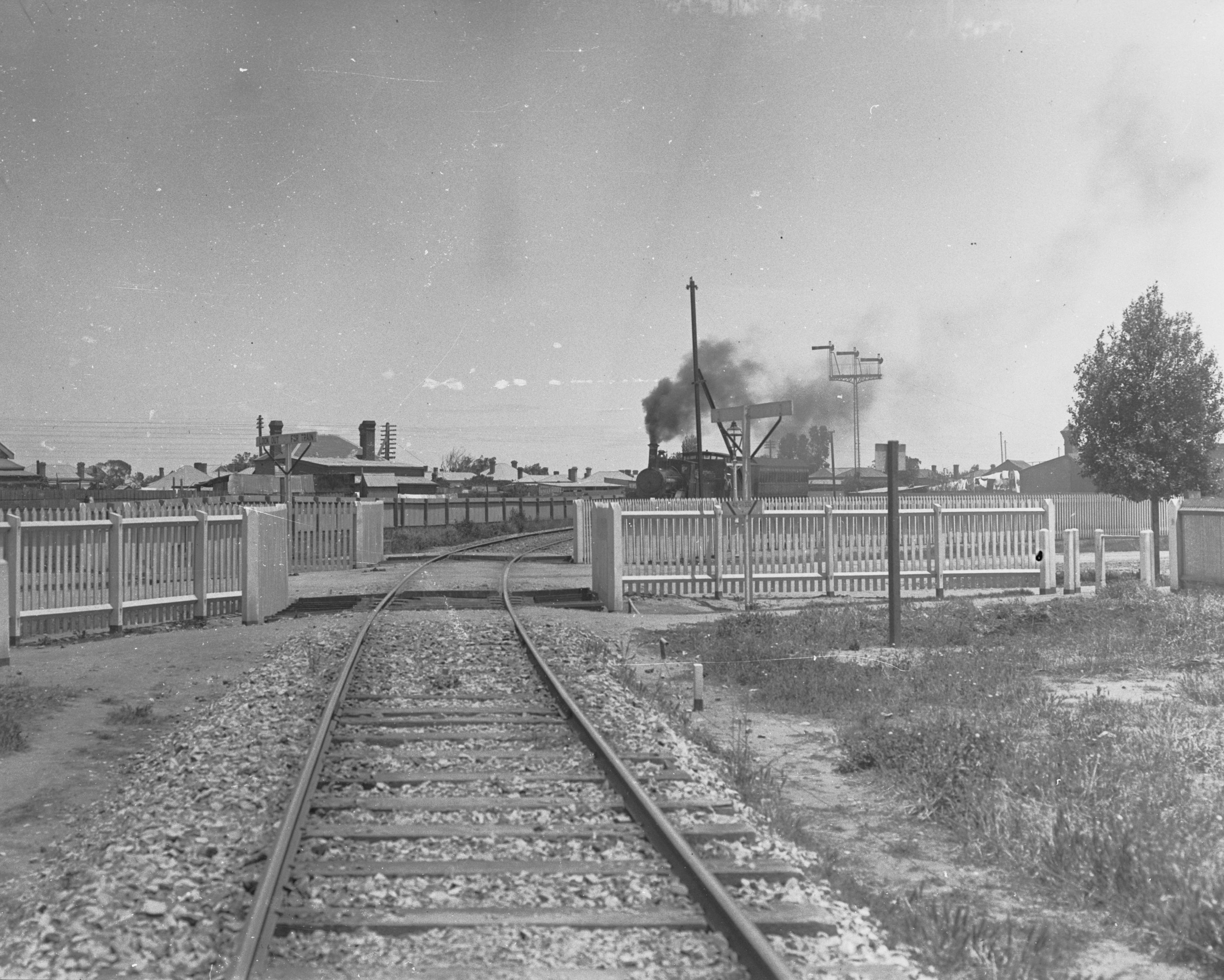
- Crossing on the Dry Creek Railway Line, Port Adelaide, South Australia, c. 1905

Overview
- Status: Operational
- Locale: Adelaide, South Australia
- Termini: Dry Creek; Port Dock originally, now Pelican Point

Service
- Type: freight only since 1988

History
- Opened: 1 February 1868
- Converted to dual gauge: 1982
- Passenger service ended: May 1988
- Extended across Port River: August 2008

Technical
- Track gauge: 4 ft 8 1/2 in (1,435 mm) standard gauge
- Old gauge: 5 ft 3 in (1,600 mm) broad gauge, later dual gauge

The Dry Creek–Port Adelaide railway line is an eight-kilometre east–west freight railway line running through Adelaide's north-western suburbs. The line is managed by the Australian Rail Track Corporation (ARTC) and is an important link between Port Adelaide, Pelican Point and the main interstate rail routes which link Adelaide with Melbourne, Perth, Darwin and Sydney. Prior to 1988, a limited local passenger service operated, stopping at five intermediate stations along the line. Since May 1988, the line has been freight-only.

== History ==
The railway from Dry Creek on the Kapunda railway line to Port Adelaide opened on 1 February 1868. Its original purpose was to allow goods and minerals from South Australia's mid-north (and from 1878, the Murray River at Morgan) to reach the Port without needing to travel via Adelaide. This line ran directly into Port Dock station (now closed) which was Port Adelaide's main rail yard in the 19th century.

Over the years, various alterations were made to the line as branch lines and goods yards opened and subsequently closed. One of the most important additions was the Rosewater Loop, which opened on 14 November 1915. The Rosewater Loop was built to help alleviate congestion at Port Dock yard. It linked at Port Adelaide "A" Junction with a new route to Glanville via the Commercial Road viaduct and Ethelton and helped divert all through trains away from the Port Dock bottleneck. This relatively new addition to the railway infrastructure became the main line.

In 1978, ownership and control of the line shifted from the State Government-controlled State Transport Authority (STA) to the federal government-controlled Australian National (AN). However the STA continued to operate local passenger trains over the route. The station and goods yards at Port Dock closed in 1981. In 1988, the old Port Dock goods yard became the site of the National Railway Museum and until 2023 was connected to the suburban Adelaide network, although the connection rarely saw any use.

=== ICI Osborne ===
The ICI Osborne railway line was constructed for the ICI Osborne works (later owned by Penrice Soda Products) in the 1940s. The line branched off southerly near Hamilton Avenue, Osborne to the plant. This line was extended at some point in the 1950s or 1960s southward to join the main line again near Seaborne Road. The line had industrial passenger service until 1980. The line was closed in 2014 following the cessation of the Penrice Stone Train from the Barossa Valley.

=== Renewal ===
In 1982, the line was converted from broad gauge to dual gauge track. This coincided with AN's conversion of the Crystal Brook to Adelaide line to standard gauge that same year. The works included converting the Rosewater Loop to dual gauge, and a section of the Outer Harbor line from the Rosewater junction to Largs North railway station where the dual gauge would branch off on a new alignment to service sidings on the western side of the Port River. It also included providing standard gauge access to those sidings and the Pelican Point container berths. At some time, this was replaced by the Birkenhead Loop which branched further south at Glanville railway station and entered all the sidings from the south.

The original route into Port Adelaide through the Gillman marshalling yards closed when the Gillman yards were removed in the early 1990s.

Following conversion of the Adelaide to Melbourne corridor to standard gauge in 1995, a south-to-west triangle was constructed at Dry Creek. This link allows trains from Melbourne and the Islington Freight Terminal to travel directly to Port Adelaide without reversing in Dry Creek yard.

In 2006, the seven kilometres of track on LeFevre Peninsula was upgraded in preparation for the opening of the Mary MacKillop Bridge. The upgrade included closing many level crossings, increasing the track speed from 25 km/h to 60 km/h, reinstating a second track, and converting it from being managed as a long rail yard to being signalled and managed as part of the main line. It coincided with the new deep sea grain terminal at Pelican Point. The works also included a new 1500m crossing loop at Wingfield.

In August 2008, work was completed on new road and rail bridges across the Port River at Port Adelaide, downstream of the inner harbour. One of these, the Mary MacKillop Bridge, diverted trains away from the Rosewater Loop and suburban rail network in Port Adelaide. Now all rail freight to and from the Lefevre Peninsula travels along the Gillman Junction to Port Flat line and accesses the existing line to Pelican Point via the new bridge.

Expanded handling facilities were constructed at Pelican Point and Outer Harbor, including a bulk grain handling terminal and overall rail tonnage is expected to increase. The main traffic using the Dry Creek -Port Adelaide line today includes: intermodal freight trains (import/export containers); bulk grain trains from agricultural areas of South Australia for export via Port Adelaide; and other freight trains servicing industrial installations on the Lefevre Peninsula (such as the Mobil oil terminal).

During 2019 ARTC commenced work to progressively remove the broad gauge rail and related infrastructure, retaining standard gauge only throughout.

== Passenger services ==
Apart from a short stretch at the western end, the Dry Creek to Port Adelaide line travels through either industrial areas or undeveloped swampland. This meant there has never been much significant passenger traffic on the line, apart from a few trains in the morning and another couple in the afternoon for workers commuting to various industrial premises. In the early years passengers were carried along the line in carriages attached to goods trains.

With introduction of Brill railcars to secondary services during the Webb era (mid-late 1920s), things improved and several return trips ran each weekday between Dry Creek and Port Dock using the new railcars. Intermediate stops were available at Wingfield (3.5 km from Dry Creek); North Arm Road (4.5 km); Eastern Parade (5.0 km); Grand Junction Road (6.0 km); and Rosewater (7.0 km). None of these stops had any substantial passenger facilities. They were either short platforms or small step-down structures by the lineside.

With the opening of the Holden car factory at Elizabeth in 1959, extra trains were added from Port Dock running through to GMH Elizabeth at shift-change time. By 1969, trains no longer stopped at Grand Junction Road or Eastern Parade stations. When Port Dock station closed in 1981, these trains were diverted to run to or from Outer Harbor via Commercial Road station.

By 1987, the STA had decided continued operation of the route was uneconomic. Trains ceased to call at Wingfield, North Arm Road and Eastern Parade stations after 31 May 1987. All passenger trains were withdrawn one year later and Rosewater and Grand Junction Road stations closed after services ceased on 29 May 1988.

=== Line guide (passenger) ===
Parking / Park 'n' Ride / Hi Frequency

Station	Image	Opened	Additional information
Port Dock		1856-04	Terminus; closed 13 September 1981, reopened 25 August 2024: Repurposed as National Railway Museum on 10 December 1988
Rosewater		1916	Closed 29 May 1988
Grand Junction Road		?	Closed 29 May 1988
Eastern Parade		?	Closed 31 May 1987
North Arm Road		?	Closed 31 May 1987
Wingfield		?	Closed 31 May 1987
Dry Creek		1856	Former branch station; still in use as part of the Gawler line.

== Route ==
The route is mainly single track, was made dual gauge throughout from 1982 but is now standard gauge. Both broad gauge 1,600 mm (5 ft 3 in) standard gauge 1,435 mm (4 ft 8 1/2 in) trains regularly used the line until 2014. The ARTC opened a crossing loop at Wingfield in 2009 to help ease delays.

Heading from Dry Creek, the line divides at Gillman Junction. The mainline heads northwest to the eastern bank of the Port River, where another branch heads to the rail yard & wharves at Port Flat The mainline continues over Perkins Drive towards the Mary MacKillop Bridge, over the port river and onto the Lefevre Peninsula. This section of the line was completed in 2008, along with the Port River Expressway project. From here the line follows the western side of the Port River through Birkenhead and Osborne to the new container facility and grain terminal at Pelican Point and wharves at Outer Harbor.

The other branch deviating from Gillman Junction, known as the Rosewater Loop, was part of the through-line for freight to Pelican Point before the completion of the Mary MacKillop Bridge in 2008; the Rosewater Loop has been disused ever since. From Gillman Junction, line curves south-west through the suburbs of Ottoway and Rosewater to join Adelaide Metro's suburban line to Outer Harbor at Port Adelaide Junction ('A' Cabin), just north of Alberton. Trains on this route continued along Adelaide Metro tracks over the Port Adelaide Viaduct and through the stations at Port Adelaide and Ethelton before branching off just south of Glanville station. After branching at Glanville, the route followed the southern side of Semaphore Road where it joined the current route to Pelican Point just north of the Mary MacKillop Bridge; this section was known as the Birkenhead Loop and was closed and lifted in 2008 with the completion of the Mary MacKillop Bridge. The curve of track adjacent to Glanville station is now residential housing and the corridor along Semaphore Road is now a shared-use path.

The tracks on the Rosewater Loop were severed in 2020 to build a bike and pedestrian link between May Terrace and Florence Terrace. The length of the Rosewater Loop and former Gillman rail yard is currently being converted into a greenway with work scheduled to begin mid-late 2023.
