= Port Dock railway station =

Terminus of spur line at Port Adelaide

Port Dock
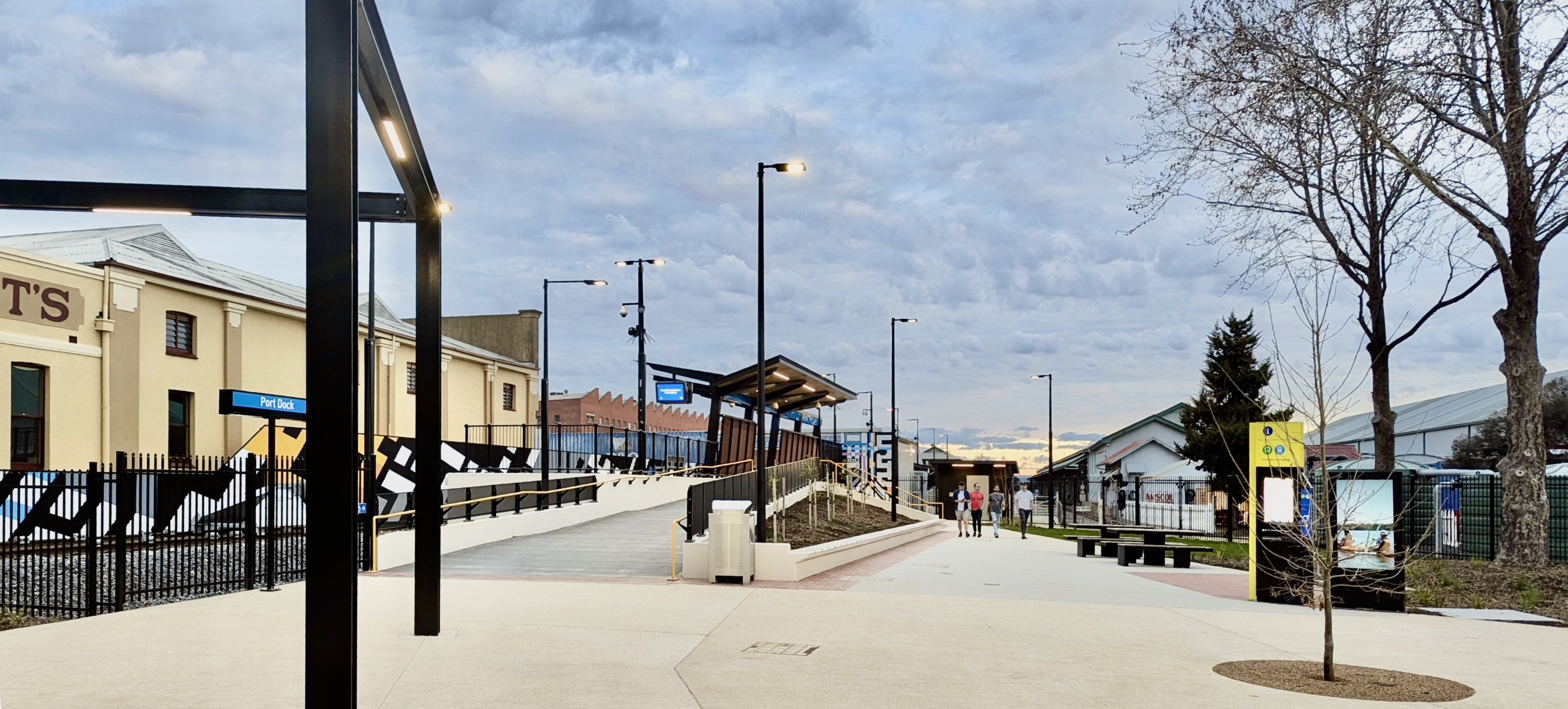
- View from the station plaza, August 2024

General information
- Location: First station: St Vincent Street, Lipson Street; Second station: Baker Street; Port Adelaide
- Coordinates: 34°50′41″S 138°30′32″E
- System: Railway station and bus interchange
- Owner: Department for Infrastructure and Transport
- Operator: Adelaide Metro
- Line: Port Dock
- Distance: 12 kilometres (7.5 miles) from Adelaide railway station
- Platforms: 1
- Tracks: Two: one for Adelaide Metro trains, one for trains of National Railway Museum
- Bus routes: 117, 118, 150, 150B, 150P, 157, 230, 232, 252, 252A, 254X, 333
- Connections: Bus

Construction
- Structure type: Side platform
- Parking: Yes
- Cycle facilities: Yes
- Accessible: Yes → level boarding

Other information
- Status: Unstaffed
- Station code: 19081
- Website: Adelaide Metro

History
- Opened: 1856
- Closed: 1981
- Rebuilt: 25 August 2024

Services
Preceding station	Adelaide Metro	Following station
Alberton towards Adelaide	Port Dock line	Terminus
Location

Port Dock railway station is the terminus of the Port Dock line, located on Baker Street, Port Adelaide. The first station was located in the commercial centre at the corner of St Vincent Street and Lipson Street and served as the original terminus of the railway between Adelaide and Port Adelaide, which opened in 1856.

After closure in 1981, the passenger station site was redeveloped as the Port Adelaide Police Station and Magistrates' Court. The former goods yard, adjacent to Lipson Street, is now occupied by the National Railway Museum. Several proposals had been advanced to build a new station, including a budgeted project by the government of South Australia in 2017, but were put on hold by the incoming Marshall government in 2019. Having made construction of the new line an election commitment in 2022, the incoming government announced funding for the railway line and a new station in December 2022. The station reopened on 25 August 2024.

== History ==
The original station was opened with the line from Adelaide in April 1856 and for the first sixty years until 1916, it was the only railway station in town and known simply as Port Adelaide. The original station was quite an impressive structure, with a large curved roof over the platforms. Facing St Vincent Street was a two-storey stone building, which also included a tower. The two side platforms were about 120–150 metres in length each, and the platform architecture was the same as the platforms at the Bowden and Alberton stations.

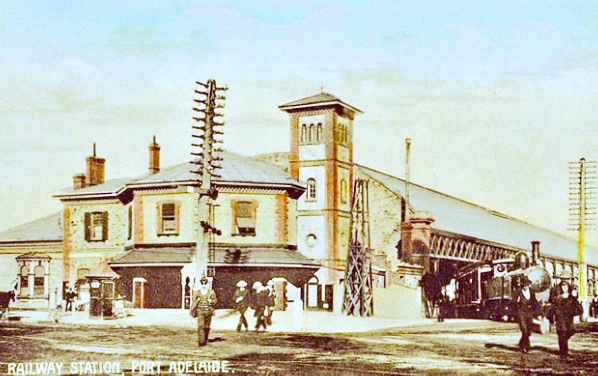
Port Dock station in 1909

In February 1868, a direct line was built from Dry Creek to Port Adelaide to allow goods and minerals from the state's mid-north and the Murray River to reach the Port directly, without needing to travel via Adelaide. In 1878 a railway was opened from Port Adelaide to Semaphore. This followed a different route to today's line as far as Glanville. The Semaphore line emerged from the western side of Port Adelaide station, travelled down the middle of St Vincent Street and crossed the Port River via the Jervois Bridge before curving to join the current alignment of the Outer Harbor line into Glanville station. Steam trains travelled through Port Adelaide's commercial centre at walking speed, with the locomotive crew ringing a bell. Even at that time this arrangement was unsatisfactory for both local citizens and the railway operators.

By the end of the 19th century, the goods yard had become very busy with imports and exports and there was a large engine shed and turntable to service the various steam locomotives working in the area. A number of railway lines extended from the station yard via city streets to the wharves and various private sidings. Occasional passenger boat trains also travelled directly to the wharves, transferring passengers to and from ocean-going ships which berthed in the inner harbour at the time.

Congestion around Port Adelaide yard resulted in the opening of the Rosewater Loop line in 1915 and construction of the Commercial Road viaduct, which opened in 1916. The viaduct line continued over a new bridge across the Port River and joined the existing line to Semaphore and Outer Harbor at Glanville. A high-level station was opened on the viaduct, Commercial Road. The original Port Adelaide station was renamed Port Dock to differentiate the two. After 1916, the frequent trains to and from Adelaide mostly continued to Semaphore or Outer Harbor via the new line and Commercial Road became the main railway station. Port Dock continued to be served by irregular trains from Adelaide and by peak hour workings to Dry Creek via the Rosewater Loop.

=== Decline ===
By the second half of the 20th century, the various lines leading through the streets to the wharves were cut back. Wharf access was firstly restricted to the Canal branch, then disconnected completely. Boat train traffic transferred to Outer Harbor and in due course was also eliminated.

Port Dock Station then became something of a backwater. The original buildings and remains of the arch roof were removed in 1963 and replaced with new buildings in the utilitarian style of that era. The station platforms were rebuilt to a length of about 70–80 metres to accommodate a maximum of three railcars, although it was very rare for a 3-car set to terminate at Port Dock. The station was finally closed in September 1981. The station platforms were removed in 1987 while the redundant sidings and goods sheds were redeveloped as a Bicentennial Project to house the former Mile End Railway Museum. The National Railway Museum opened on its site in Lipson Street in December 1988.

=== New station project ===
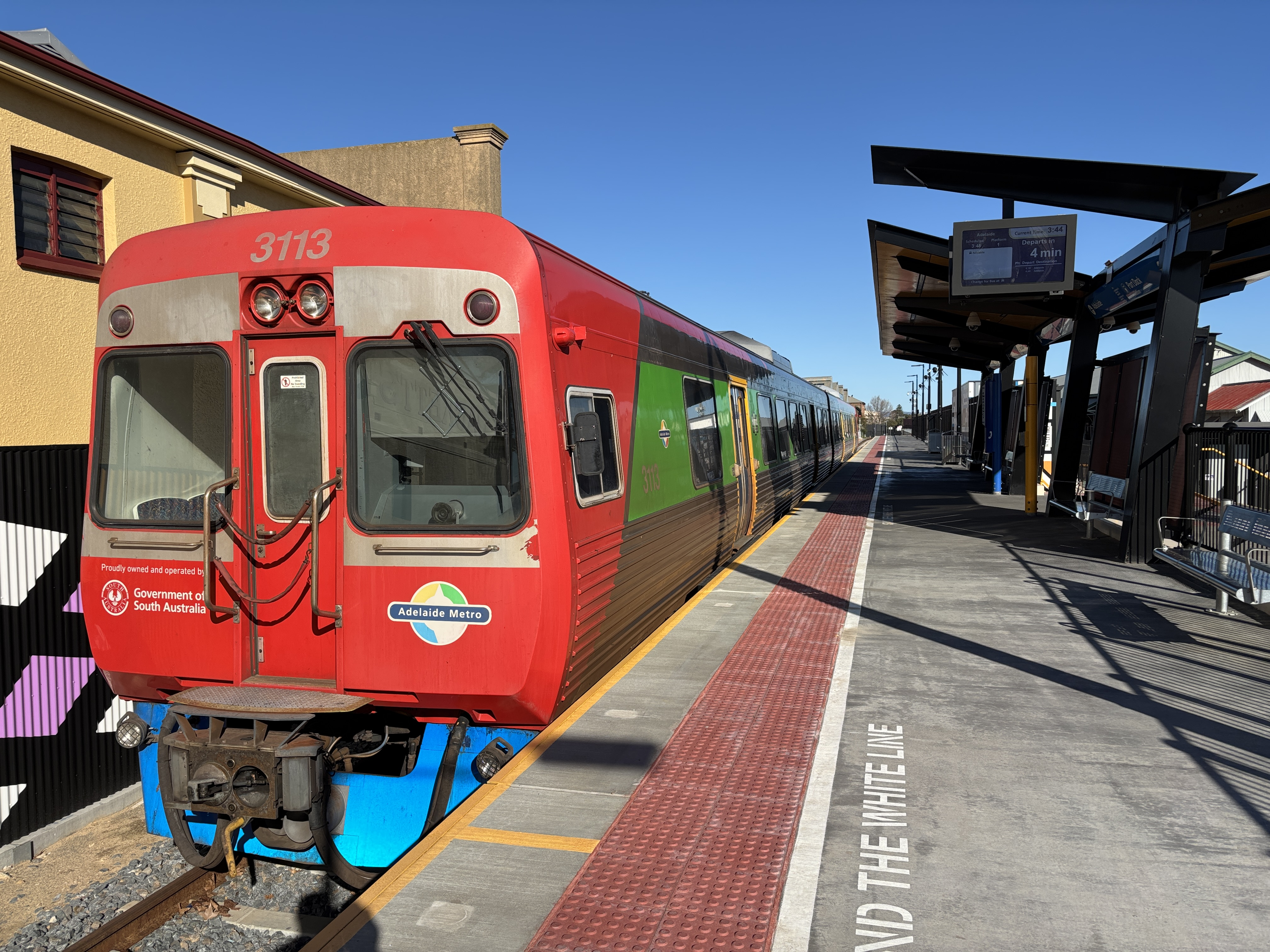
A train at the new Port Dock railway station in 2025

In 2017, $16.4 million was allocated in the state budget for a new station to be built next to Baker Street, near the original site. It was to be at the end of a new 1.0 km (1100 yard) spur line off the existing Outer Harbor rail line, using the existing corridor beside the National Railway Museum that connects to the Outer Harbor line. However, in June 2019 when some museum track had already been dismantled, the development was "put on hold" while a North West Planning Study was conducted; a forecast cost increase to $40 million was cited. (Note: For a double mainline connection and signalling, a 300-metre loop, about 700 metres of new line, a level crossing and basic station.) On-ground preparatory work was reversed in January 2020, with sleepers bought for the project being reallocated to other lines.

In 2022, the state government committed $51 million for the construction of the new Port Dock Railway Line with a new station and bus interchange at Baker Street, adjacent to the National Railway Museum. A short platform face known as Jacketts siding, replacing a short platform of the same name, was also constructed for Railway Museum heritage services running along a parallel stretch of track. Site preparation works began for the new railway line in June 2023; the tracks were completed in April 2024, and a 3000 class railcar (3123-3124) made a test run on 2 June. The station and interchange reopened on 25 August 2024.

== Services by platform ==
Trains depart Port Dock every 30 minutes, seven days a week. All services departing Port Dock stop at all stations to Adelaide.

Platform	Lines	Destinations	Notes
1	Port Dock	all stops services to Adelaide	Terminus

== Transport Links ==
Adelaide Metro operates several bus services through the adjacent bus interchange at Port Dock.

Bus transfers: Stop Port Dock Interchange (Zone A)
Route no.	Destination & route details
117	Port Adelaide to City via Bartley Tce, West Lakes, Tapleys Hill Rd and Crittenden Rd
118	Port Adelaide to City via Tapleys Hill Rd and Crittenden Rd
150	Osborne to City via Victoria Rd, Fletcher Rd, Queen Elizabeth Hospital and Port Rd
230	Port Adelaide to City via Addison Rd, Arndale, Days Rd and Jeffcott St
232	Port Adelaide to City via Newcastle St, Arndale, Regency Rd, Harrison Rd and Jeffcott St
252	Port Adelaide to City via Ottoway, Medika Blvd, Liberty Gr, Arndale and Hawker St
254	Port Adelaide to City via Grand Junction Rd, Hanson Rd, Arndale and Hawker St
333	North Haven to Port Adelaide Interchange via Military Rd, Hart St and Glanville Station
361	Port Adelaide to Tea Tree Plaza via Grand Junction Rd, Nelson Rd, Helen Tce and Smart Rd
N254	Semaphore to City via Arndale and Hawker St (Operates Saturday PM - Sunday AM)
