= Surrey Downs, South Australia =

Surrey Downs
- Suburb
- Country: Australia
- State: South Australia
- City: Adelaide
- LGA: City of Tea Tree Gully
- Location: 4 km (2.5 mi) from Modbury

Government
  - State electorates: King; Wright
  - Federal division: Makin

Area
  - Total: 1.6 km^{2} (0.62 sq mi)

Population
  - Total: 3,358 (SAL 2021)
- Postcode: 5126
Suburbs around Surrey Downs
	Golden Grove
Wynn Vale	Surrey Downs	Fairview Park
Modbury Heights	Redwood Park	Banksia Park

Surrey Downs is a northeastern suburb of Adelaide, South Australia. It is located in the City of Tea Tree Gully local government area, and is adjacent to Wynn Vale, Golden Grove, Fairview Park and Redwood Park.

== History ==
The area was originally used for agriculture and viticulture, but was redeveloped as outer suburban housing during the 1970s.

Surrey Downs Post Office opened on 13 October 2000 replacing the Fairview Park office (open since 1965).

== Geography ==
The boundary of Surrey Downs forms a triangle defined by Golden Grove Road to the west and north, Hancock Road to the east and Grenfell Road to the south.

== Facilities ==
Surrey Downs has a local shopping centre with a chemist, supermarket and several smaller speciality shops; the newly rebuilt Fairview Park shopping centre is also nearby. The Surrey Downs Primary School and Kindergarten are also located within the suburb – the nearest high school (depending on location within the suburb) is either The Heights School, Golden Grove High School or Banksia Park International High School.

Surrey Downs also has a community oval, known as Illyarrie Reserve, which is home to the Golden Grove Central Districts Baseball Club in the South Australian Baseball League.

== Transport ==
The 541, 543 and 547 and J3 bus routes service Surrey Downs. Since October 2006 the 541G makes extended stops to the bus interchange at the Golden Grove Village, which is operated by Adelaide Metro. Proposals exist to extend the Adelaide O-Bahn to Golden Grove, but the route it might take from Tea Tree Plaza Interchange is unknown. This is however unlikely, now the proposal for a new interchange for the Golden Grove hub is underway and there are now buses which take street routes to get there.

== See also ==
- City of Tea Tree Gully
- List of Adelaide suburbs
