= City of Tea Tree Gully =

Coordinates: 34°50′S 138°41′E

- Local government area
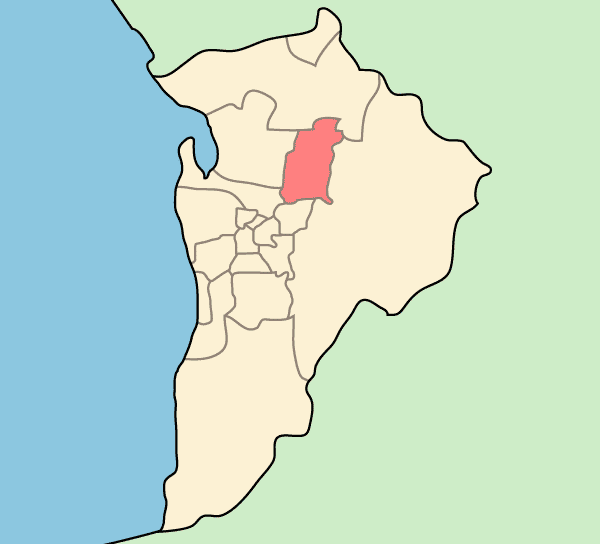

- Interactive map of City of Tea Tree Gully
- Country: Australia
- State: South Australia
- Region: Northern Adelaide
- Established: 1858
- Council seat: Modbury

Government
  - Mayor: Marijka Ryan
  - State electorate: Hartley, King, Morialta, Newland, Schubert, Torrens, Wright
  - Federal division: Makin, Sturt

Area
  - Total: 95.21 km^{2} (36.76 sq mi)

Population
  - Total: 101,174 (LGA 2021)
  - Density: 1,062.64/km^{2} (2,752.2/sq mi)
- Website: City of Tea Tree Gully
LGAs around City of Tea Tree Gully
City of Playford	City of Playford	City of Playford
City of Salisbury	City of Tea Tree Gully	Adelaide Hills Council
City of Port Adelaide Enfield	City of Campbelltown	Adelaide Hills Council

The City of Tea Tree Gully is a local council in the Australian state of South Australia, in the outer north-eastern suburbs of Adelaide. The major business district in the city is at Modbury, where Westfield Tea Tree Plaza, Modbury Hospital, the Civic Centre and the library are located.

Howard, Lord Florey, Australian pathologist and co-discoverer of penicillin, was a resident of the City of Tea Tree Gully.

== History ==
The Tea Tree gully itself passes through the Adelaide foothills roughly marking the easiest path eastwards from Grand Junction Road to Gumeracha. The 1850s settlement at the entrance to the gully (approximately where North East Road enters the foothills) was known as the village of 'Steventon' after local resident and miller, John Stevens, who was a major landowner in the area. The name Steventon is retained as one of the electoral wards of the City of Tea Tree Gully.

The council was originally proclaimed in October 1858 as the District Council of Tea Tree Gully, when the northern half of the District Council of Highercombe, which had been created in 1853, successfully seceded to form its own municipality. In the early 1930s, the two councils were considered unviable, being very small in relative size and population. The District Council of Highercombe was included in a Local Government Commission list of 53 local councils with annual revenue of less than £2000. Following the commission recommendation, the two councils were recombined under the name Tea Tree Gully in May 1935.

It inherited the former 1855 Highercombe council chambers, which had been built in Tea Tree Gully, and used that building until 1967. The Old Tea Tree Gully Council Chambers survive today and are listed on the South Australian Heritage Register, having been the first purpose-built district council chambers in South Australia. In 1967 the Tea Tree Gully civic centre was opened, comprising a new council chamber and civic hall. The municipality was granted city status and proclaimed as the City of Tree Gully on 8 February 1968.

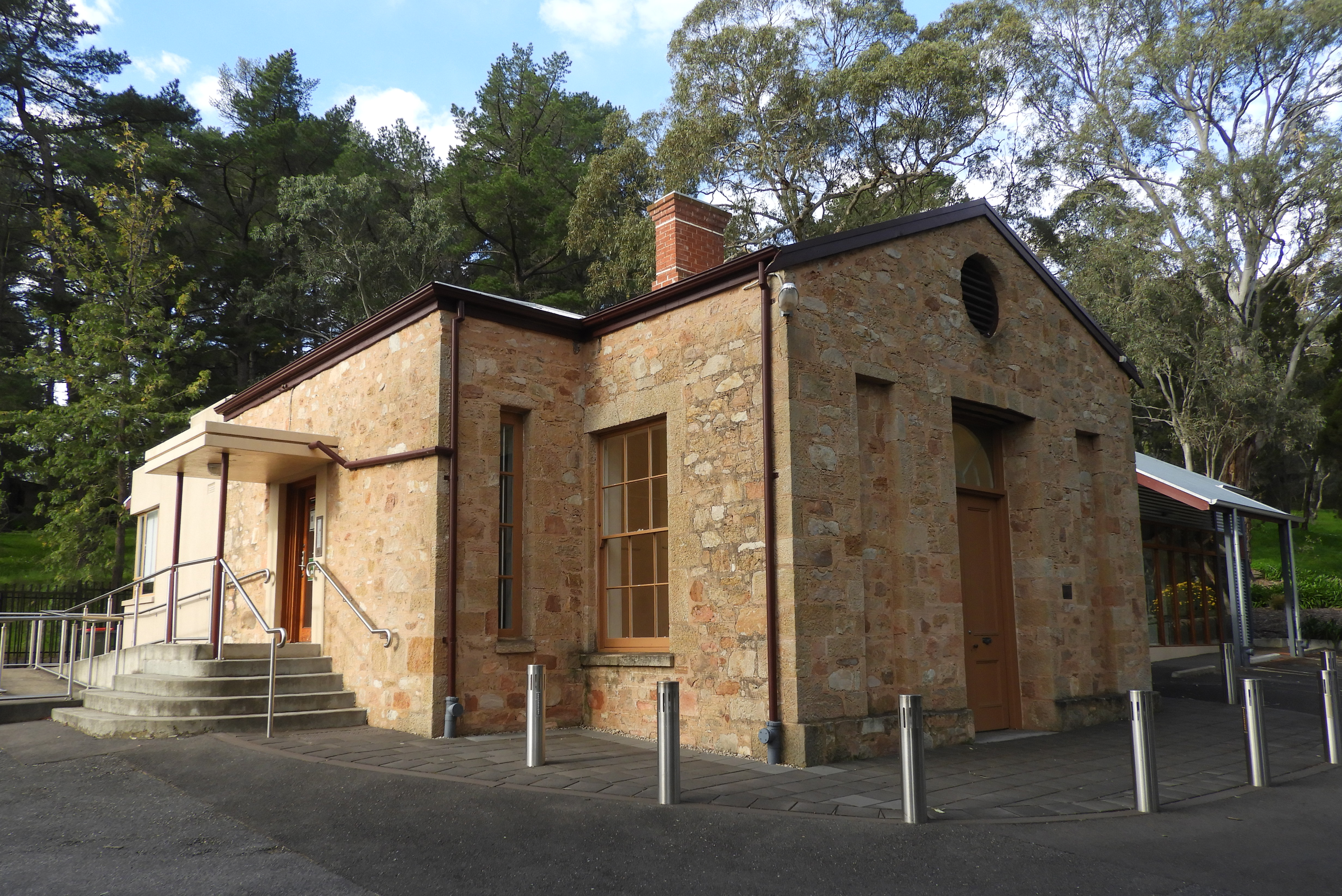
Gallery 1855

A council-owned colonial building was converted into a community art gallery, and is now known as Gallery 1855. The gallery hosts regular contemporary art and craft exhibitions and artist-led workshops.

From 1954 to 1971 the population of Tea Tree Gully council rose from just over 2,500 to almost 37,000, and in 1975 it had reached approximately 55,000 as urban residential development quickly expanded. By 2004 the population had exceeded 100,000.

== Council ==
Council consists of 13 Elected Members comprising a Mayor, and 12 Ward Councillors. The Council area is divided into six wards, with two Counicllors elected from each ward.

The current council as of June 2025 is:

Ward	Party Affiliation	Councilor	First elected	Notes
Mayor	Liberal	Marijka Ryan	2022	
Balmoral Ward	Independent	Rob Unger	2018	Deputy Mayor (2022-2024)
Balmoral Ward	Liberal	Irena Zagladov	2022	
Drumminor Ward	Independent	Kimberley Drozdoff	2022	
Drumminor Ward	Liberal	Lyn Petrie	2018	Lyn Petrie was elected by a recount of votes following the resignation in November 2023 of former Councillor Damian Wyld due to illness.
Hillcott Ward	Labor	Kristianne Foreman	2021	Deputy Mayor (2025-2026)
Hillcott Ward	Independent	Sandy Keane	2014	
Pedare Ward	Independent	Bernie Keane	1994	
Pedare Ward	Independent	Donna Proleta	2025	Elected by a supplementary election held in March 2025, following the resignation of Cr Tammie Sinclair in 2024.
Steventon Ward	Independent	Jessica Hawkvelt	2018	Deputy Mayor (2024-2025)
Steventon Ward	Labor	Lucas Jones	2008	
Watergully Ward	Independent		Marina Champion	2022
Watergully Ward		Vacant		Blake Lawrenson resigned from Council in January 2026. A supplementary election will not be held as it falls within 12 months of the 2026 Local Government elections.

== Chairmen and Mayors of Tea Tree Gully ==
- William Henry Ind (1936–1943)
- Albert George Dearman (1943-1951)
- George Norman Lambert (1951-1954)
- Albert George Dearman (1954-1955)
- David Stanley Goodes (1955-1957)
- Basil David Mitchell (1957–1960)
- Viggo Ole Jacobsen (1960–1965)
- William Green (1967–1969)
- William Gilbert Brassington (1969–1972)
- John Charles Burford (1972–1974)
- John Garfield Tilley (1974–1981)
- Donald David Stuart (1981–1982)
- John Garfield Tilley (1982–1989)
- Thomas Edward Loveland Milton (1989-1991)
- Lesley Purdom (1991-1997)
- Bernie Keane (1997-2000)
- Lesley Purdom (2000-2006)
- Miriam Smith (2006-2014)
- Pat Trainor (2014)
- Kevin Knight (2014-2022)
- Marijka Ryan (2022-Current)

== Geography ==
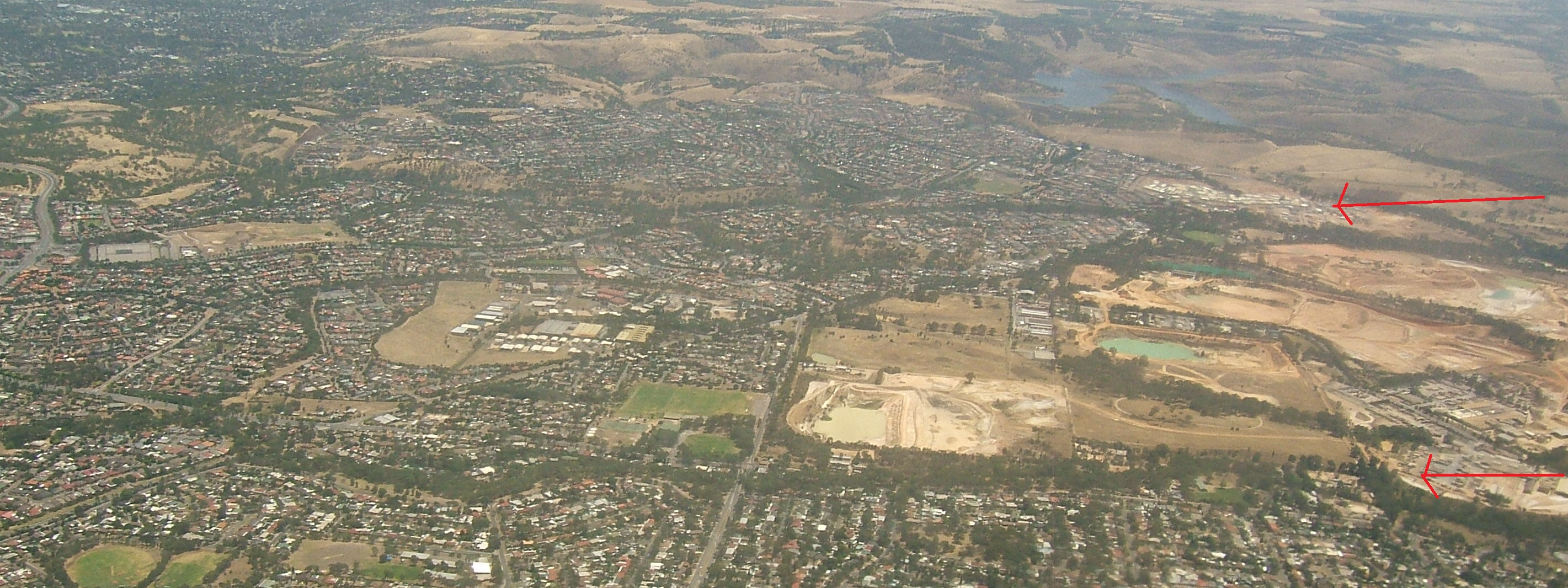
Aerial image of the Golden Grove and Greenwith areas, looking north. Greenwith is to the north, and the border is Cobbler Creek, which is straddled by a treeline indicated by the upper red arrow. The southern border of Golden Grove is indicated approximately by the southern treeline marked by the arrow. The triangle in the southwestern corner of the photo is Surrey Downs, and to the southeastern corner is Fairview Park. Little Para Reservoir is the body of water. The light patches on the eastern part of the image are quarries. This is the northern part of the City of Tea Tree Gully.

The gully to which the city name refers actually exists and is known to be sizable as it provided a gradient negotiable only by bullock wagons travelling through the Mt. Lofty Ranges. Additionally the gully had permanent freshwater springs which promoted the growth of tea trees in the area – thus the eventual name 'Tea Tree Gully'.

The 350-hectare (860-acre) Anstey Hill Recreation Park is adjacent to the suburbs of Vista and Tea Tree Gully.

== Sister cities ==
The City of Tea Tree Gully, has two sister cities. They are:

- Asakuchi, Japan (April 2006)
- Borodyanka, Ukraine (May 2023)

== Suburbs and post codes ==
- Banksia Park – 5091
- Dernancourt – 5075
- Fairview Park – 5126
- Gilles Plains – 5086
- Golden Grove – 5125
- Gould Creek – 5114
- Greenwith – 5125
- Gulfview Heights – 5096
- Highbury – 5089
- Holden Hill – 5088
- Hope Valley – 5090
- Houghton – 5131
- Modbury – 5092
- Modbury Heights – 5092
- Modbury North – 5092
- Para Hills – 5096
- Redwood Park – 5097
- Ridgehaven – 5097
- St Agnes – 5097
- Salisbury East – 5109
- Surrey Downs – 5126
- Tea Tree Gully – 5091
- Upper Hermitage – 5131
- Valley View – 5093
- Vista – 5091
- Wynn Vale – 5127
- Yatala Vale – 5126

== See also ==
- Local Government Areas of South Australia
- List of Adelaide parks and gardens

== Notes and references ==
Notes

- Auhl, Ian (1976). From settlement to city: a history of the district of Tea Tree Gully, 1836–1976. Blackwood, SA: Lynton Publications.
- Auhl, Ian (1993). Tea Tree Gully Historical Society (ed.). From settlement to city: a history of the district of Tea Tree Gully, 1836–1976, 1976–1993. Modbury, SA: Tea Tree Gully Council. ISBN 9781742224770.
