= Redwood Park, South Australia =

Redwood park
- Suburb
- Coordinates: 34.81°S 138.71°E
- Country: Australia
- State: South Australia
- City: Adelaide
- LGA: City of Tea Tree Gully
- Location: 3 km (1.9 mi) N of Tea Tree Gully
- Established: 1959

Government
  - State electorate: Wright
  - Federal division: Makin

Population
  - Total: 5,367 (SAL 2021)
- Postcode: 5097
Suburbs around Redwood park
Wynn Vale	Surrey Downs	Fairview Park
Modbury Heights	Redwood park	Banksia park
Modbury North	Ridgehaven	Tea Tree Gully

Redwood Park is a suburb in the northeastern suburbs of Adelaide, South Australia.

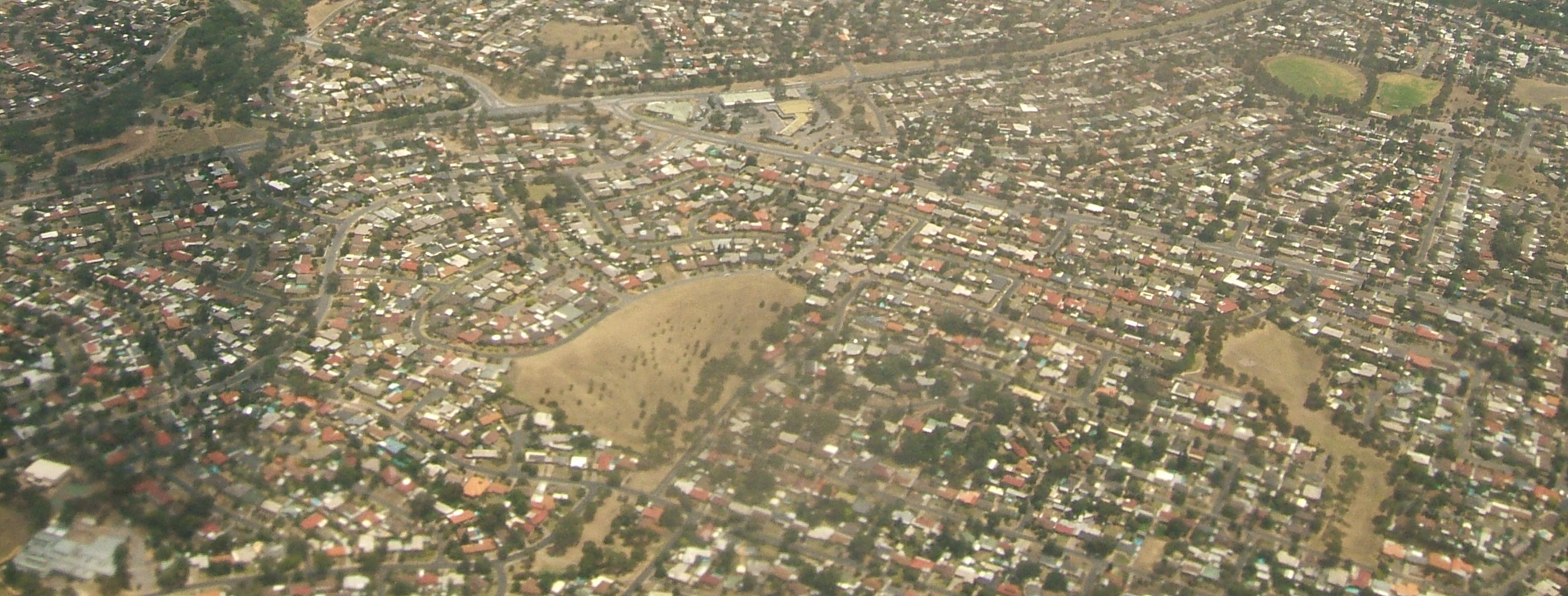
Aerial view of northern Redwood Park facing northwest: Golden Grove Road is seen travelling horizontally at the top of the image. Grenfell Road forms a T junction with that road near the centre and travels to the right edge of the image. Redwood Park is south of these two roads. North of Grenfell Road is Surrey Downs, at the top-right of the image.

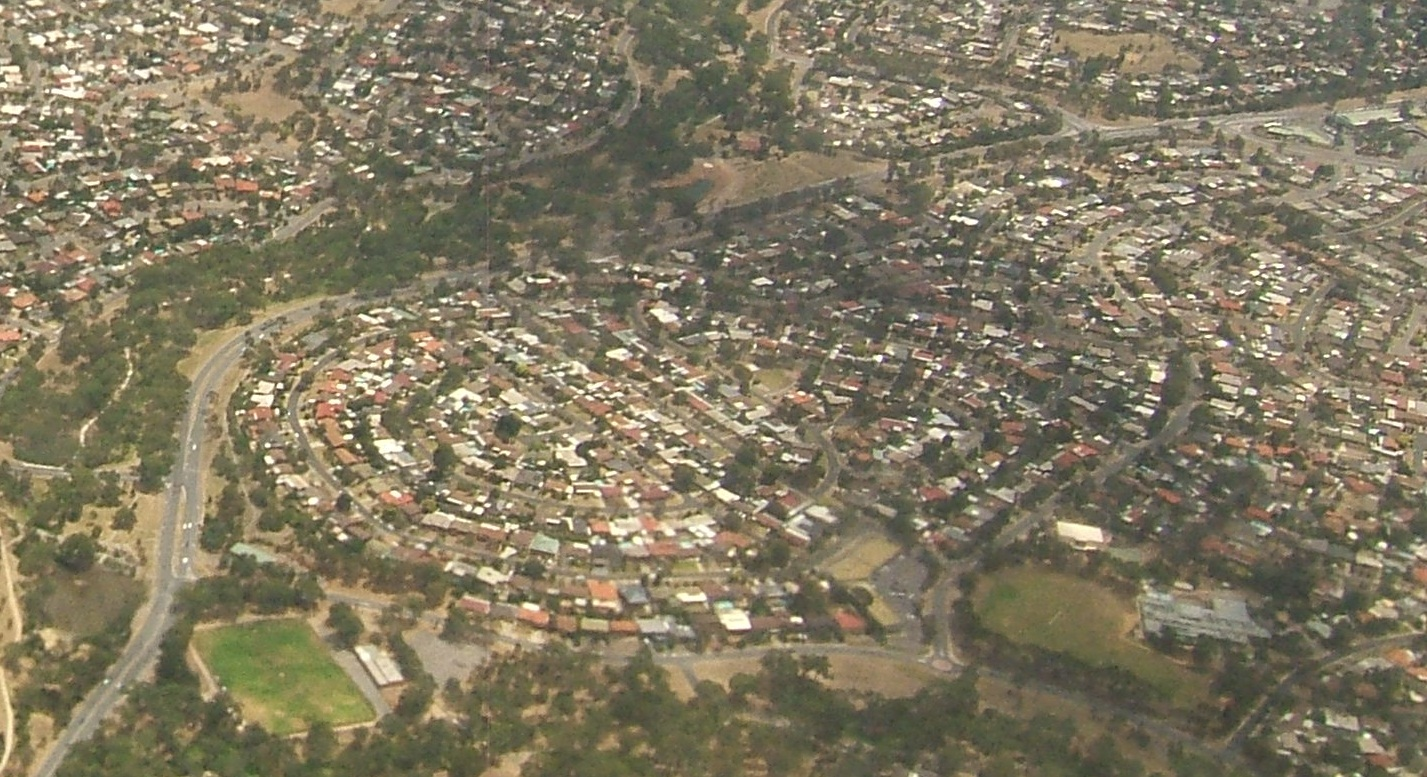
Aerial view of southwestern Redwood Park facing northwest and showing Golden Grove Road bounding the western edge of the suburb

== History ==
Redwood Park was established in 1959 based on an earlier private subdivision of section 1591 of the Hundred of Yatala by agreement between the District Council of Tea Tree Gully, the Postmaster General and the Nomenclature Committee at the time.
