= Vista, South Australia =

Vista
- Suburb
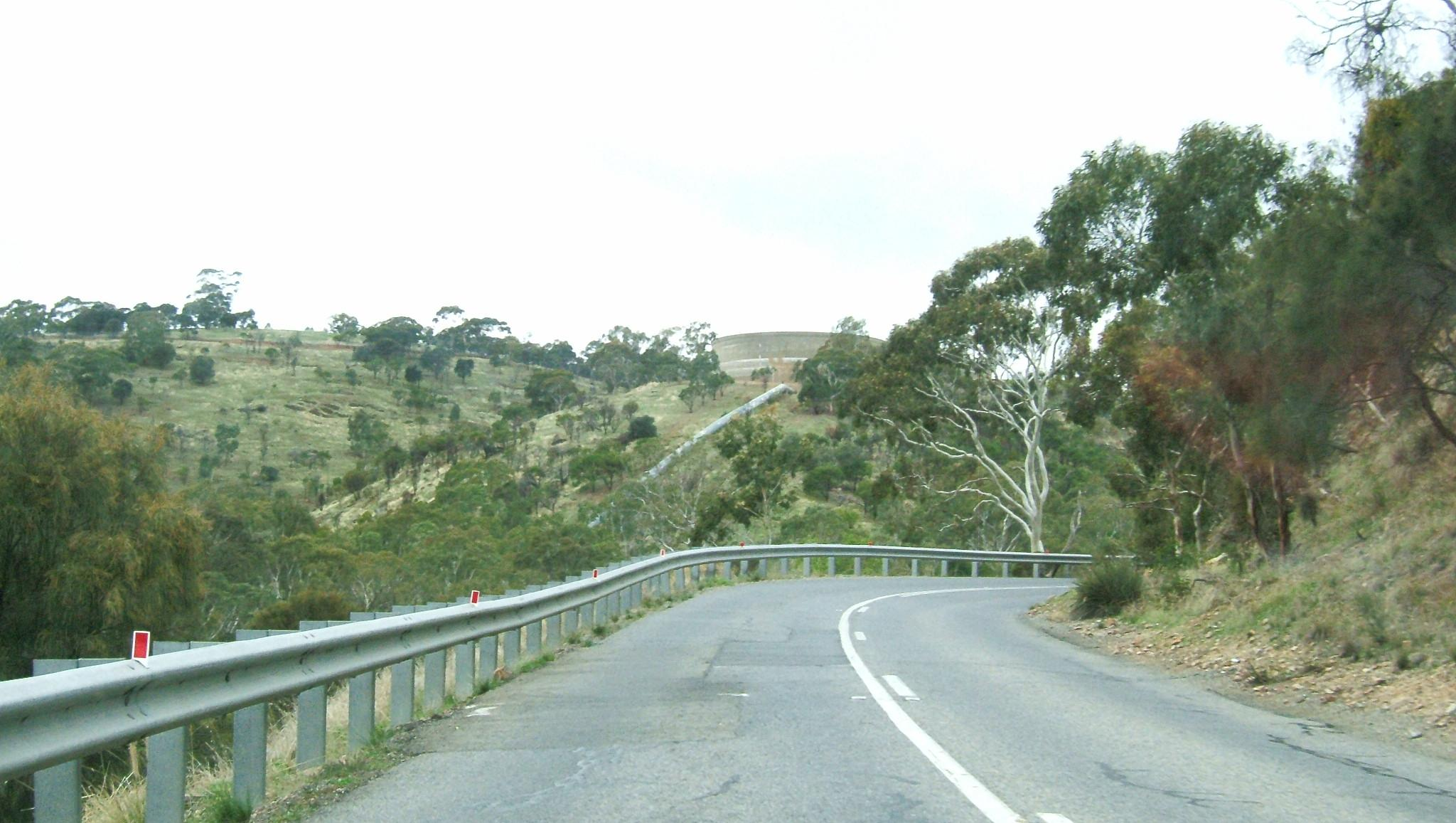
- Lower North East Road

- Country: Australia
- State: South Australia
- City: Adelaide
- LGA: City of Tea Tree Gully
- Location: 4 km (2.5 mi) from Modbury
- Established: 1959

Government
  - State electorate: Newland
  - Federal division: Makin

Area
  - Total: 9 km^{2} (3.5 sq mi)

Population
  - Total: 1,035 (SAL 2021)
- Postcode: 5091
Suburbs around Vista
	Tea Tree Gully
St Agnes	Vista	Houghton
Hope Valley	Highbury	Paracombe

Vista is a small north-eastern suburb of Adelaide, South Australia and is within the City of Tea Tree Gully local government area. It is adjacent to Houghton, Tea Tree Gully, St Agnes and Hope Valley.

== History ==
First farmed in the 1840s, the area was subsequently used for mining of dolomite and quartzite, grazing, fruit growing and an extensive plant nursery (in use from 1854 to 1913), which is now in ruins. The residential portion was settled since the 1890s as part of the Hope Valley settlement, and was primarily used for viticulture. The Vista subdivision was created in 1927 but was not significantly developed until the 1950s-1960s.

== Geography ==
The boundary of Vista is defined by Lower North East Road to the south, Hancock Road to the west, and a line extending from Smart Rd, St Agnes to the north. The eastern three-quarters of the suburb is part of the Anstey Hill Recreation Park.

At the ABS 2001 census, Vista had a mostly middle-income population of 918 people living in 366 dwellings, an outright majority of whom were from the Great Britain and Ireland.

== Facilities ==
Anstey Hill (371m) (named after George Anstey (1814-1895), a local viticulturalist) and the surrounding 362-hectare Anstey Hill Recreation Park, which was dedicated in 1989, provides opportunities for bushwalking, birdwatching, photography, painting and flora enthusiasts, with historical sites and scenic views over the Adelaide Plains. The Park was ravaged by the Ash Wednesday fires in 1983, and signs of the destruction can still be seen. The park also conserves a range of rare flora and fauna.

St Agnes Primary School is across the road from the residential part of the suburb, and a prosthodontic dentist operates in Perseverance Road.

== Transport ==
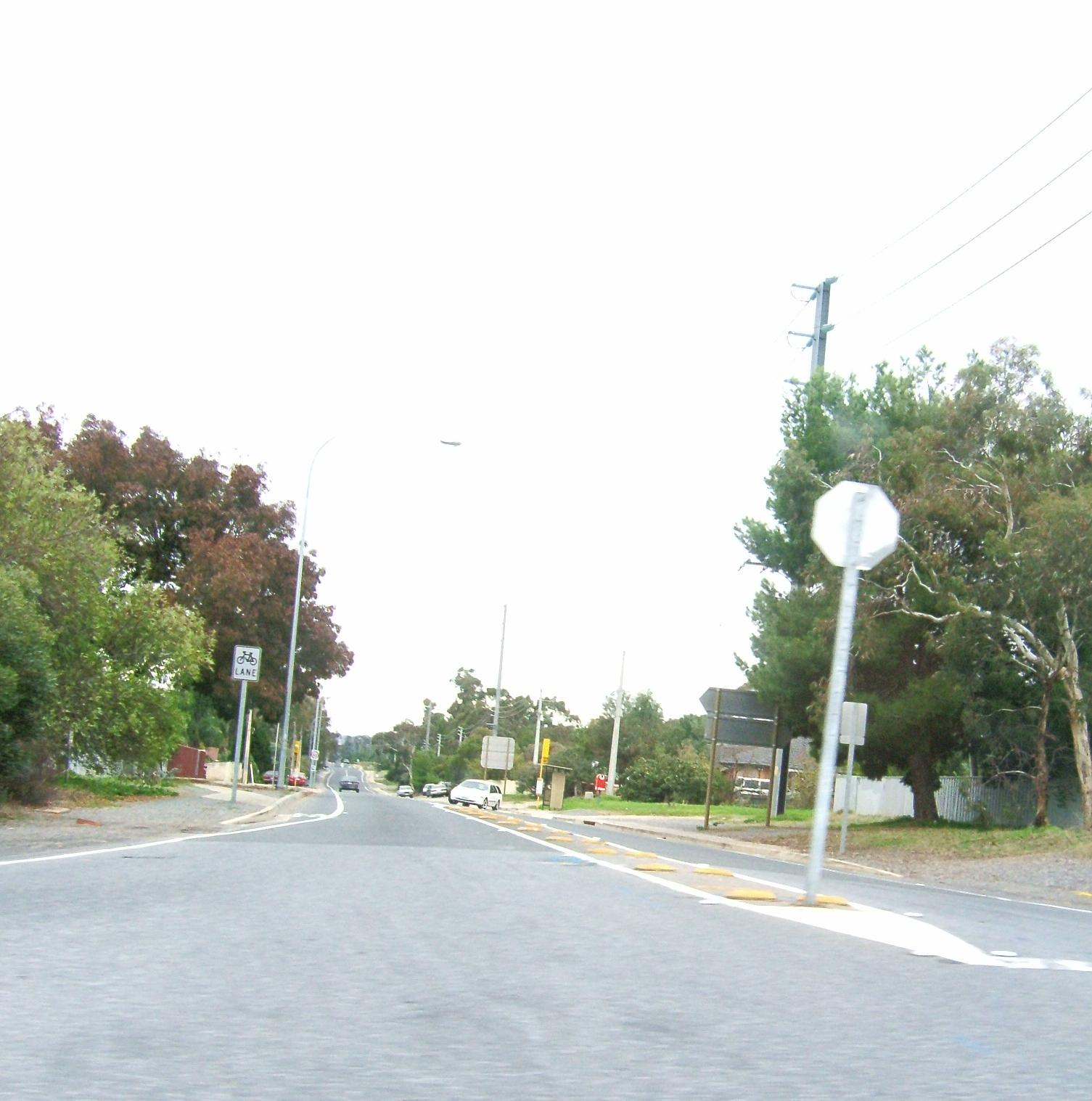
The main road

The 557 and 558 bus routes service Vista, linking it with the Tea Tree Plaza Interchange and Paradise Interchange. Paradise links to the Adelaide CBD via the Adelaide O-Bahn. All services are operated by Adelaide Metro.
