= King's Baptist Grammar School =

- Adelaide, South Australia; Australia

Information
- Type: Independent, Christian college
- Motto: Latin: Visio Fidei (Vision of Faith)
- Denomination: Baptist; Non-denominational
- Established: 1983
- Principal: Don Grimmett
- Campus: Wynn Vale (ELC-Year 12), Adelaide Hills (ELC-Year 12)
- Colours: Green and maroon
- Slogan: Better, together.
- Website: http://www.kingsbaptist.sa.edu.au

King's Baptist Grammar School is a Baptist school in Adelaide, South Australia with two campuses. The first campus opened in Wynn Vale, a north eastern suburb of Adelaide, South Australia, in 1989, having moved from nearby Tea Tree Gully where it was known as Tea Tree Gully Christian School; a second campus, located in Mount Barker, was opened in 2023.

== History ==
Construction of the Wynn Vale site began in November 1988, as part of the Golden Grove development. On 7 February 1989, King's Baptist Grammar School opened on its Wynn Vale Campus with 300 students.

The school was expanded with a new science and performing arts building (completed at the end of 2004) including four specialist laboratories, four instrumental teaching rooms, a keyboard lab, and amphitheatre, as well as an extension to the Design and Technology building, dedicated to CAD.

In 2013, 950 students were enrolled at the school. In 2025, the school had 1,316 students enrolled across both campuses.

== Facilities ==
The school shares an oval, library and out-of-school hours care facility with the government Keithcot Farm Primary School. A second public oval is also accessed by the school.

The school's arts program is a popular extra-curricular activity amongst students. The school competed in the Rock Eisteddfod Challenge until 2003, after which it began producing and performing its own musical productions.

== Notable alumni ==
- Daniel Menzel: Australian rules footballer with the Geelong Football Club
- Troy Menzel: Australian rules footballer with the Adelaide Football Club
- Guy Sebastian: Australian Idol winner
