= Gulfview Heights, South Australia =

Gulfview Heights
- Suburb
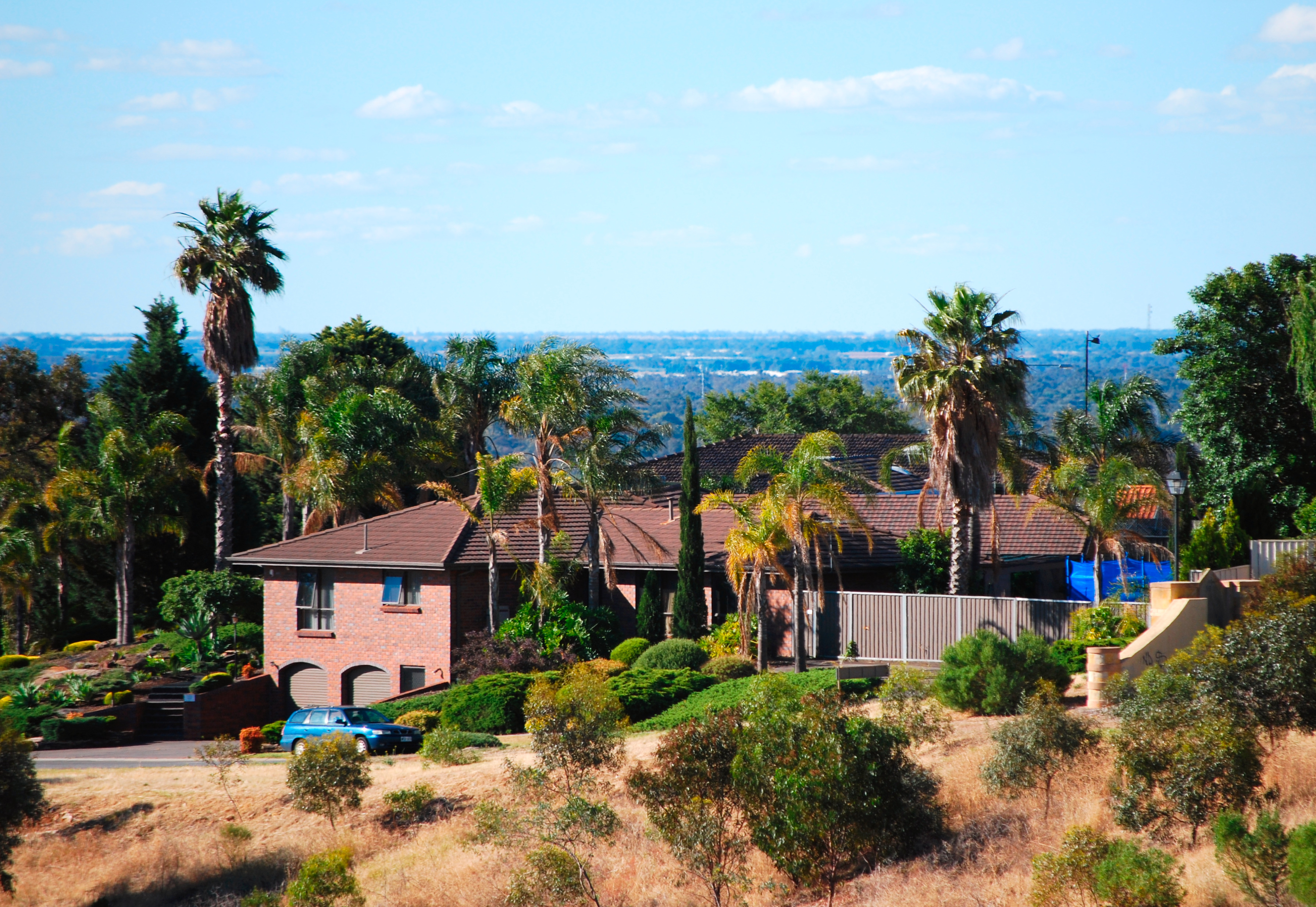

- Country: Australia
- State: South Australia
- City: Adelaide
- LGA: City of Salisbury
- Location: 5 km (3.1 mi) from Modbury
- Established: 1996

Government
  - State electorate: Wright
  - Federal division: Makin

Population
  - Total: 3,674 (SAL 2021)
- Postcode: 5096
Suburbs around Gulfview Heights
	Greenwith	Golden Grove
Salisbury East	Gulfview Heights	Wynn Vale
Para Hills West	Para Hills	Modbury Heights

Gulfview Heights is a small suburb of Adelaide, South Australia and is within the City of Salisbury and City of Tea Tree Gully local government area. It is adjacent to Wynn Vale, Salisbury East and Para Hills.

== Area ==
The size of Gulfview Heights is approximately 4 km^{2}. It has 4 parks covering nearly 10% of the total area. There is 1 school located in Gulfview Heights. The population of Gulfview Heights in 2001 was 2,632 people. By 2006, the population was 2,971 showing a population growth of 13% in the area during that time. The predominant age group in Gulfview Heights is 10–19 years.

The boundary of Gulfview Heights is the Smith Road extension and the southern boundary of Cobbler Creek Recreation Park to the north, the suburb of Wynn Vale to the east, Bridge Road to the west and Para Hills Ovals & Yulinda Gully to the south. Bayview Parade is the main thoroughfare for the estate, while Kiekebusch Road services the north (both running roughly north–south). Wynn Vale Drive and McIntyre Road run through the suburb in a roughly east–west direction.

== Facilities ==
The suburb has one primary school – Gulfview Heights Primary School (formerly Salisbury South-East Primary School) – and is near several others such as King's Baptist Grammar School, Keithcot Primary in Wynn Vale and Keller Road Primary in Salisbury East. Para Hills and Golden Grove High Schools are nearby, as is the Golden Grove Village Shopping Centre.

The 288 hectare Cobbler Creek Recreation Park is accessible from Smith Road, and ranges from open grasslands near Bridge Road to red gums along the creek itself. There are no visitor facilities or amenities other than a number of walking trails starting from Smith Road extension and McIntyre Road. There is also a number of parks and reserves the largest being Wynn Vale Gullies (58 Ha and includes a lake), Pepermint Gum Gully (48 Ha) and Yulinda Gully (22 Ha). All of which extend into neighbouring suburbs. There is also a number of smaller parks and reserves, several with play equipment in Leonard Street Reserve and Cordoba Avenue Reserve.

== Transport ==
The 560 bus route links Bridge Road with the Adelaide O-Bahn at the Tea Tree Plaza Interchange, and also to the Salisbury bus/train interchange. The 500 & 502 bus routes link Bridge Road with the Adelaide O-Bahn at the Paradise Interchange, and also to the Salisbury bus/train interchange

== See also ==
- City of Salisbury
- List of Adelaide suburbs
