= Modbury North, South Australia =

Modbury North
- Suburb
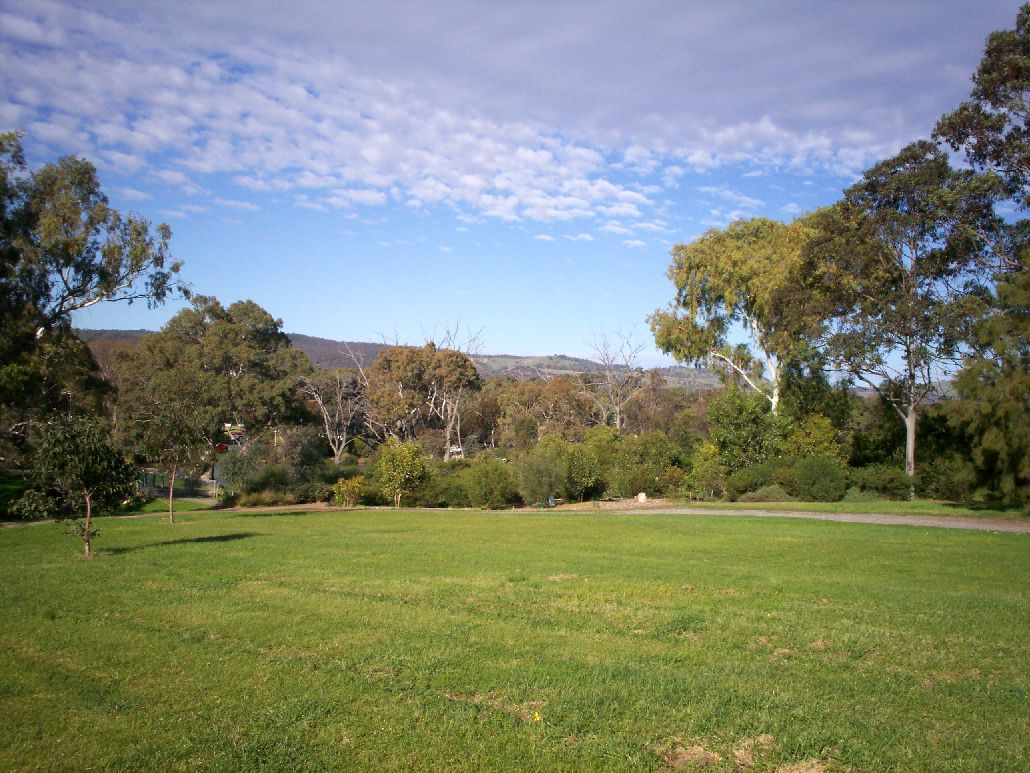

- Country: Australia
- State: South Australia
- City: Adelaide
- LGA: City of Tea Tree Gully

Population
  - Total: 5,704 (SAL 2021)
- Postcode: 5092
Suburbs around Modbury North
Para Hills	Modbury Heights	Redwood Park
Para Vista	Modbury North	Ridgehaven
Para Vista	Modbury	Modbury

Modbury North is a suburb 14 km northeast of Adelaide, capital city of South Australia.

Modbury North is a suburb in the City of Tea Tree Gully Council area.

The suburb is bounded by Milne Road in the north, Golden Grove Road in the east and Montague Road in the south. The suburb's western boundary runs parallel with, but midway between, Kelly Road and Nelson Road.

Dry Creek runs along the eastern boundary of Modbury North and in flows to the creek are stored in the Kingfisher Wetlands Project, a water catchment area that has provided a habitat for birds, insects and lizards. It is a popular recreational space for walking, cycling, and exercising pets.

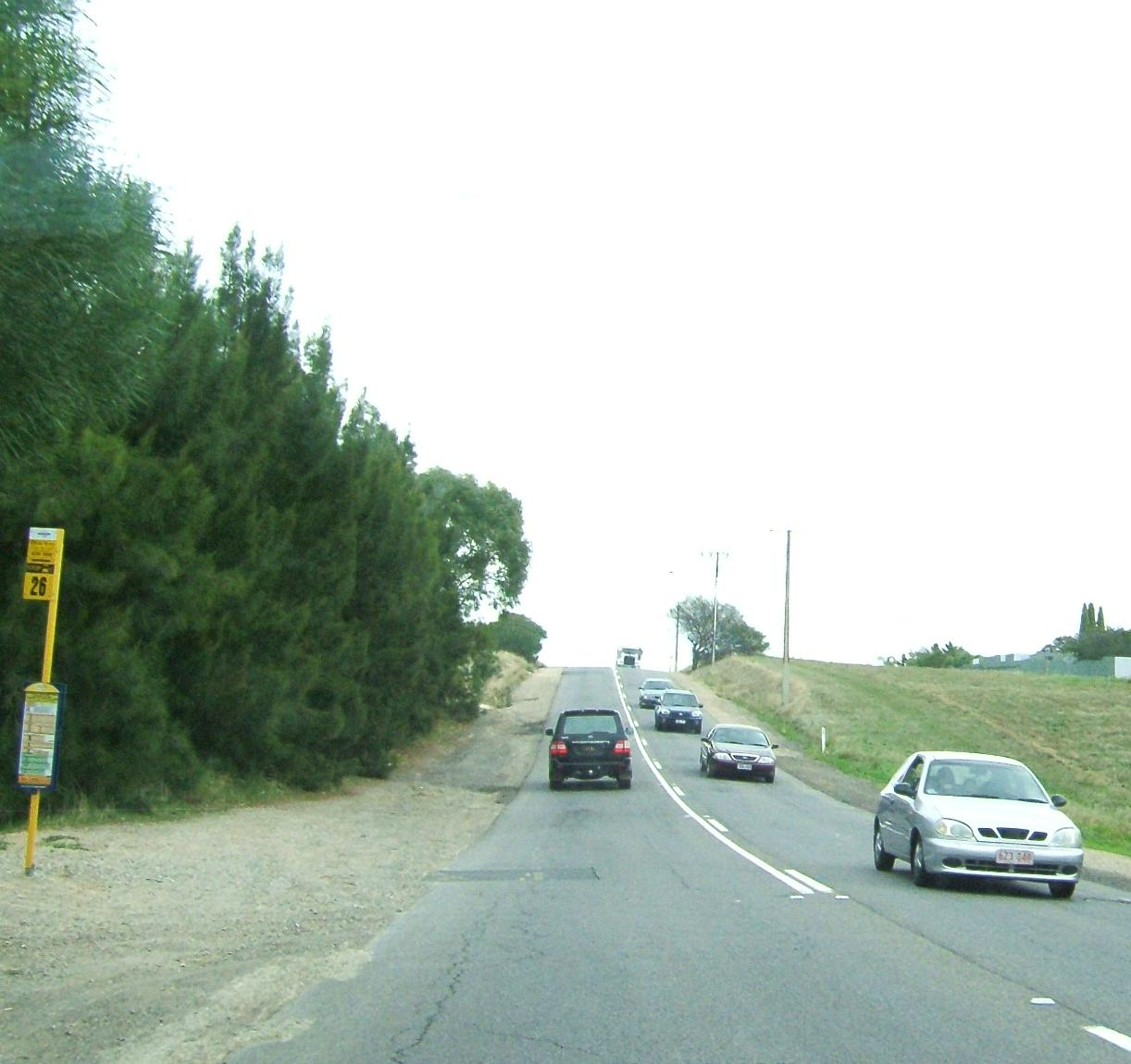
Montague Road

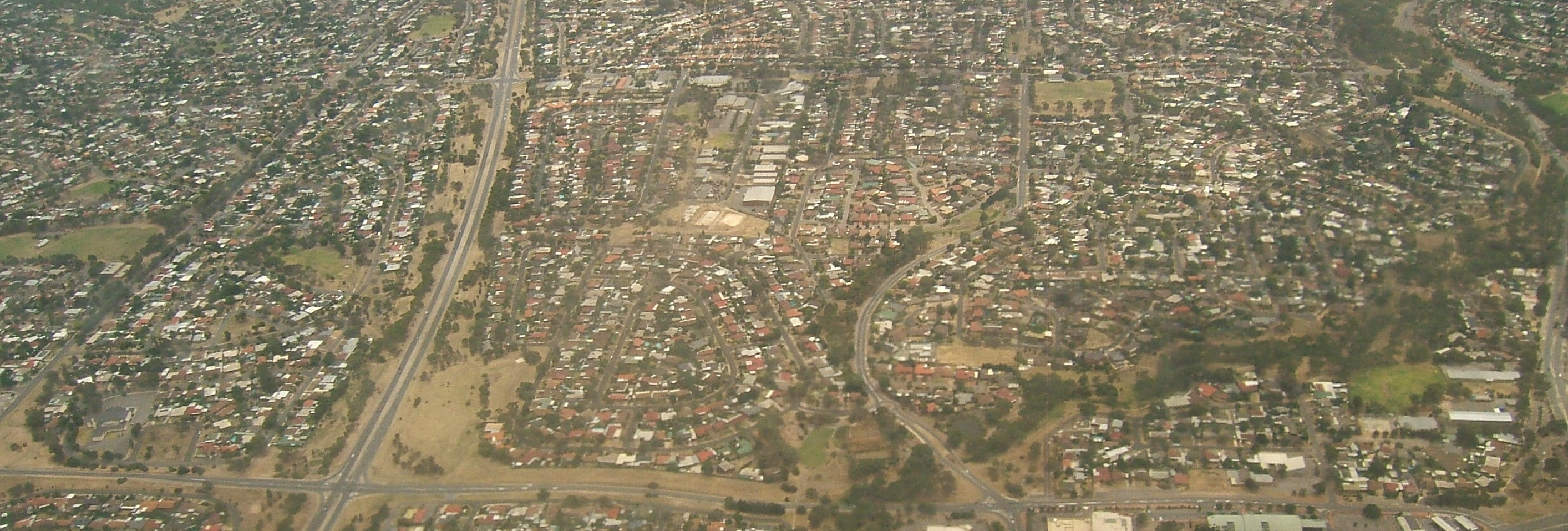
Aerial image of Modbury North, looking north. Montague Road is the east-west road at the bottom, and Milne Road at the top. From left to right, the two vertical north-south roads are McIntyre and Ladywood Roads. The part above Montague Road is Modbury North.

== School ==
Modbury Primary School is located at 2-18 Golden Grove Road, Modbury North.
