= Surrey Downs =

Surrey Downs may refer to

- North Downs, a ridge of chalk hills in south east England
- Surrey Downs, South Australia, a suburb of Adelaide
