= Modbury Heights, South Australia =

Modbury Heights
- Suburb
- Country: Australia
- State: South Australia
- City: Adelaide
- LGA: City of Tea Tree Gully
- Location: 16 km (9.9 mi) NE of Adelaide
- Established: 1857

Government
  - State electorate: Wright
  - Federal division: Makin

Population
  - Total: 6,995 (SAL 2021)
- Postcode: 5092
Suburbs around Modbury Heights
Gulfview Heights	Wynn Vale	Surrey Downs
Para Hills	Modbury Heights	Fairview Park
Para Vista	Modbury North	Redwood Park

Modbury Heights is a medium-sized suburb in the City of Tea Tree Gully, Adelaide. The suburb is located in the foothills of the Mount Lofty Ranges around 16 kilometres north east of the Central business district. Much of the suburb is residential but there is a small shopping area along Ladywood Road.

The suburb is bounded by Grenfell Road to the north, Milne Road to the south, Mcintyre Road to the west, Golden Grove Road to the east and is cut in half by Ladywood Road. Modbury Heights is also bounded to the north and north west by the suburb of Wynn Vale, to the north east by Surrey Downs, to the east by Fairview Park, to the south by Modbury North, to the west by Para Hills and to the south east by Redwood Park.

== History ==
The area was first settled by Europeans in 1857, however major development did not begin until the 1970s, beginning as a northerly residential extension to central Modbury.

== Demographics ==
According to the 2006 Census, the population of the Modbury Heights census area was 5,601 people. Approximately 50.7% of the population were female, 74.7% are Australian born, over 90.5% of residents are Australian citizens and only 0.6% were native born indigenous people. 20.1% of the population identify themselves as Catholic, while a slightly higher 28% identify with no religion at all.

== School ==
The Heights School is located on Brunel Drive, Modbury Heights and has the Ignite Program.

== Transport ==
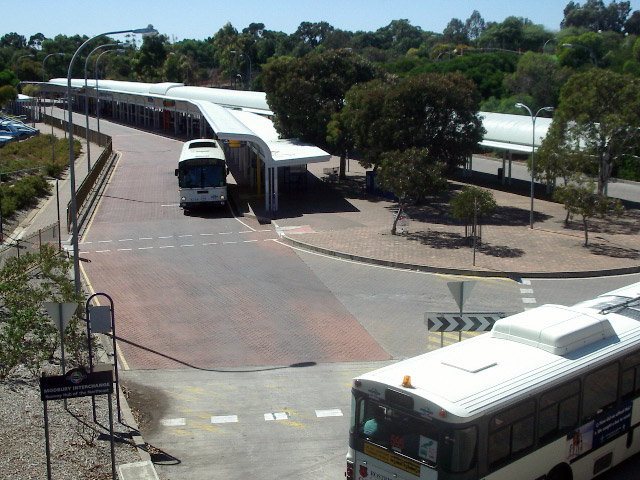
The Tea Tree Plaza Interchange

Modbury Heights is connected to the major Adelaide thoroughfare North East Road via Mcintyre and Ladywood Roads. Adelaide's city centre can typically be reached by car in 25–30 minutes.

High frequency bus services as well as connections to the O-Bahn Busway mean 10% of Modbury Heights residents travel to work by bus. The main bus route for Modbury Heights is the M44 bus, provided by the multi-service Adelaide Metro. This bus travels from Marion and the city, via the O-Bahn Busway and Tea Tree Plaza Interchange to Golden Grove. The route through Modbury Heights is on Ladywood Road. Other bus services include the 545, 203 and 209.

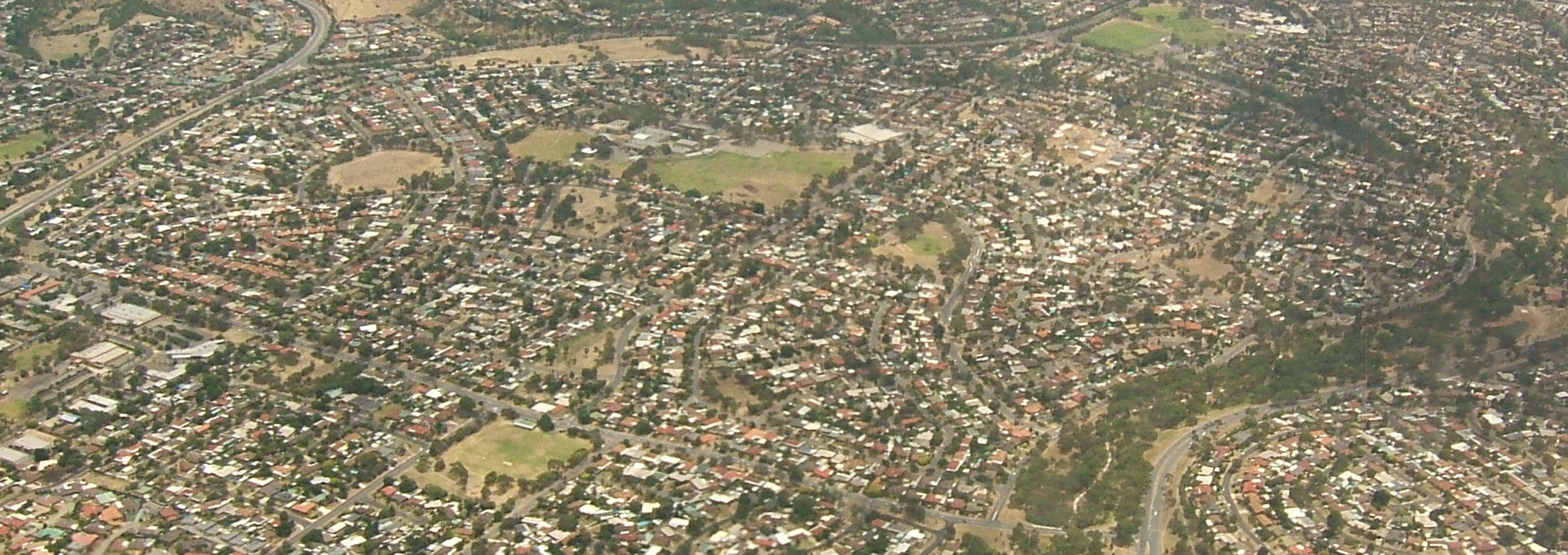
Aerial image of Modbury Heights, looking northwest. Milne Road is the east-west road that is sloping downwards in the foreground, and the north-south road that is visible and veers to the right of the image is Golden Grove Road, along the treeline. The suburb is to the northwest of these roads and is bounded by the curve at the top of the image. The green oval in the middle of the image, slightly above centre, is The Heights School.

== Politics ==
2007 federal election
Labor	51.45%
Liberal	39.26%
Greens	3.97%
Family First	3.11%
Democrats	1.41%
One Nation	0.55%

2006 state election
Labor	54.6%
Liberal	31.4%
Family First	6.2%
Greens	4.9%
Democrats	4.2%

Modbury Heights is part of the state electoral district of Florey, which has been held since 1997 by Labor MP Frances Bedford. In federal politics, the suburb is part of the division of Makin, and has been represented by new Labor MP Tony Zappia since 2007. The results shown are from the largest polling station in Modbury Heights – which is located at The Heights School, on Brunel Drive.

Until the 2007 federal election, Makin was one of the most marginal seats in the country. But with the retirement of Liberal MP Trish Draper, and a general swing toward Labor of around 7%, the seat fell and although still marginal, is no longer under threat. Florey has been a safe Labor seat since the 2002 state election.

== See also ==
- City of Tea Tree Gully
- List of Adelaide suburbs
