= Division of Makin =

Australian federal electoral division

Coordinates: 34.799°S 138.699°E

Makin Australian House of Representatives Division
- Interactive map of boundaries since the 2019 federal election
- Created: 1984
- MP: Tony Zappia
- Party: Labor
- Namesake: Norman Makin
- Electors: 123,686 (2025)
- Area: 162 km^{2} (62.5 sq mi)
- Demographic: Outer metropolitan

The Division of Makin (/meɪkən/) is an electoral division for the Australian House of Representatives located in the northeastern suburbs of Adelaide. Makin was established in the South Australian redistribution of 3 September 1984 and named after MP and diplomat Norman Makin. The Division of Makin consists of part of the City of Port Adelaide Enfield, part of the City of Salisbury and part of the City of Tea Tree Gully.

== Geography ==
The 162 km^{2} seat covers an area from Little Para River and Gould Creek in the north-east to Grand Junction Road in the south and Port Wakefield Road in the west, including the suburbs of Banksia Park, Fairview Park, Golden Grove, Greenwith, Gulfview Heights, Ingle Farm, Mawson Lakes, Modbury, Para Hills, Para Vista, Pooraka, Redwood Park, Ridgehaven, Salisbury East, Salisbury Heights, St Agnes, Surrey Downs, Tea Tree Gully, Valley View, Vista, Walkley Heights, Wynn Vale, Yatala Vale, and parts of Gepps Cross and Hope Valley.

== History ==
Since 1984, federal electoral division boundaries in Australia have been determined at redistributions by a redistribution committee appointed by the Australian Electoral Commission. Redistributions occur for the boundaries of divisions in a particular state. They occur every seven years, or sooner if a state's representation entitlement changes, or when divisions of a state are malapportioned.

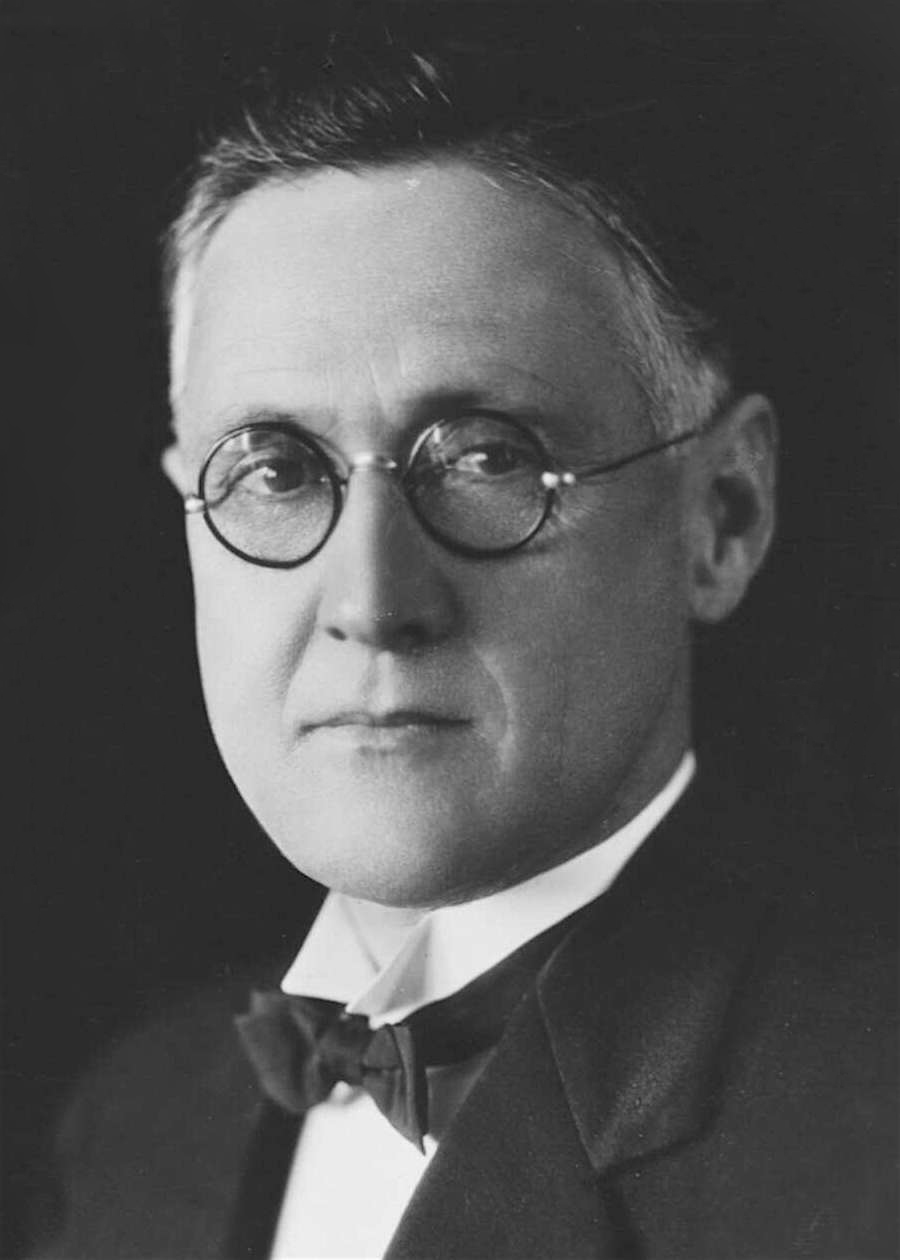
Norman Makin, the division's namesake

The Division Makin was established in the South Australian redistribution of 3 September 1984 and named in honour of the Hon. Norman John Oswald Makin AO, 1889-1982. Makin was a Member of the House of Representatives for a total of 36 years (1919-46 and 1954-63) and Speaker of the House of Representatives (1929-31). He was the first President of the United Nations Security Council in 1946, and served as Ambassador to the United States from 1946 to 1951. The electorate was a marginal mortgage belt seat, with a higher proportion of the population in the area paying off home loans. In the 2006 census, over 42 percent of the seat's electors had a home mortgage, ranking it 19th highest in Australia's 150 seats.

Created ahead of the 1984 election as a notionally fairly safe Labor seat, Labor won marginally. For the first quarter-century of its existence, the seat was a bellwether seat held by the party of government, both often typical of mortgage belt seats. During this time, it was usually marginal, with neither party winning more than 54 percent of the two-party vote.

=== Later years ===
Labor's Tony Zappia won the seat at the 2007 election, with a fairly safe 57.7 percent two-party vote against Liberal candidate Bob Day. A wider 8.6 percent two-party swing won Labor government, the largest two-party vote and swing of any party in Makin's history at the time. Zappia won enough primary votes to take the seat on the first count, the first time a candidate won a majority of the primary vote in Makin.

At the 2010 election, Zappia technically made it a safe Labor seat with a 62.2 percent two-party vote, again the strongest result for any party in Makin's history. Even though Mawson Lakes was added to Makin in a redistribution, Zappia held the seat at the 2013 election with a reduced marginal 55.1 percent two-party vote even as Labor lost government, becoming the first opposition member in Makin's history. He consolidated his hold on the seat at the 2016 election with a 59.5 percent two-party vote.

=== Bellwether seat ===
ABC psephologist Antony Green listed Makin as one of eleven which he classed as bellwether electorates in his 2016 election guide. Notably, Makin was the only bellwether located outside of New South Wales and Queensland.

== Members ==
Image	Member	Party	Term	Notes
	Peter Duncan (1945–)	Labor	1 December 1984 – 2 March 1996	Previously held the South Australian House of Assembly seat of Elizabeth. Served as minister under Hawke. Lost seat
	Trish Draper (1959–)	Liberal	2 March 1996 – 17 October 2007	Retired
	Tony Zappia (1952–)	Labor	24 November 2007 – present	Incumbent

== Election results ==
2025 Australian federal election: Makin
Party	Candidate	Votes	%	±%
Labor	Tony Zappia	50,764	47.82	+1.52
Liberal	Irena Zagladov	23,871	22.49	−8.95
Greens	Samuel Moore	13,134	12.37	+0.93
One Nation	Alison Dew-Fennell	7,152	6.74	+2.00
Trumpet of Patriots	Mark Aldridge (withdrew)	4,263	4.02	+2.25
Family First	Sue Nancarrow	3,521	3.32	+3.32
Animal Justice	Geoff Russell	2,524	2.38	+2.38
Fusion	Amelie Hanna	919	0.87	+0.87
Total formal votes		106,148	93.83	−2.04
Informal votes		6,985	6.17	+2.04
Turnout		113,133	91.50	+0.30
Two-party-preferred result
Labor	Tony Zappia	68,633	64.66	+3.86
Liberal	Irena Zagladov	37,515	35.34	−3.86
Labor hold		Swing	+3.86	

== See also ==
- 2016 Australian federal election
- Results of the Australian federal election, 2016 (South Australia)
