= Banksia Park, South Australia =

Banksia Park
- Suburb
- Banksia Park streetscape

- Coordinates: 34°48′36″S 138°43′48″E
- Country: Australia
- State: South Australia
- City: Adelaide
- LGA: City of Tea Tree Gully
- Location: 20 km (12 mi) from Adelaide

Government
  - State electorate: Newland
  - Federal division: Makin

Area
  - Total: 5.1 km^{2} (2.0 sq mi)

Population
  - Total: 3,346 (SAL 2021)
- Postcode: 5091
Suburbs around Banksia Park
| Surrey Downs | Fairview Park | Lower Hermitage |
| Redwood Park | Banksia Park | Lower Hermitage |
| St Agnes | Tea Tree Gully | Lower Hermitage |

Banksia Park is a north-eastern suburb located 20 kilometres (12 mi) from the city centre of Adelaide, South Australia, within the City of Tea Tree Gully.

== History ==
Banksia Park was originally named Steventon by John Stevens, the first purchaser of this block of land, however the name was later changed to Banksia Park due to the abundance of banksia trees located within the area.

Steventon Post Office opened around January 1859 and was renamed Tea Tree Gully in 1872. A Banksia Park office has never existed.

== Residents ==
In 2001, Banksia Park had a population of 3,455 with 48% being in the age group of 25–54 years. By 2006, the population dropped to 3,398 and by 2011, it has dropped again to 3,238. However, at the 2016 Australian Census, the population was recorded as having increased to 3,289.

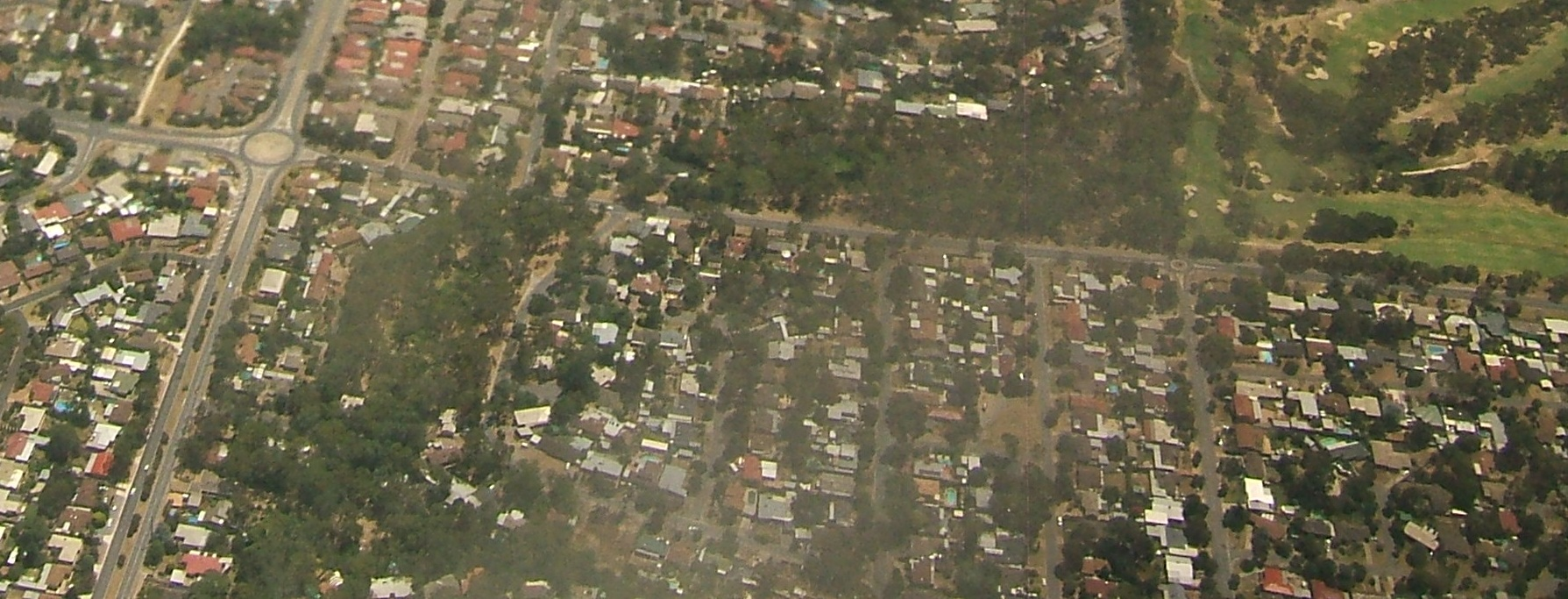
Aerial image of the northwestern part of Banksia Park, looking north. Hancock Road is the north–south road visible on the left-hand side of the image, and Grenfell Road is the east–west road. They intersect at the roundabout in the top-left hand corner. Banksia Park is the area southeast of the roundabout. The green region to the top right is part of Tea Tree Gully Golf Course.
