= Golden Grove, South Australia =

Golden Grove
- Suburb
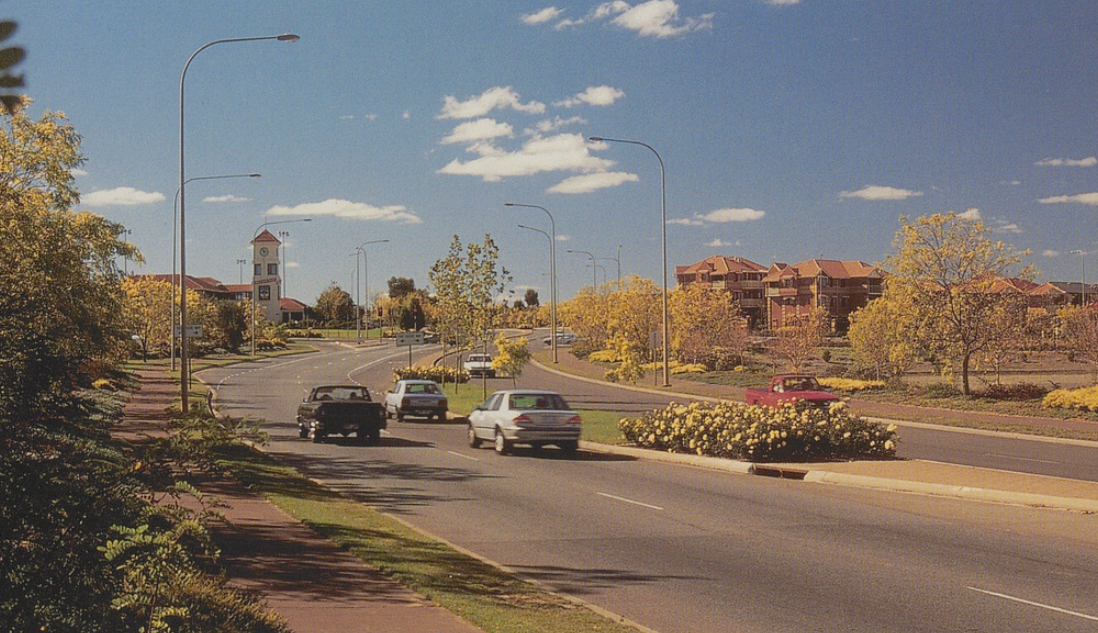
- The Golden Way (pictured) is one of the main thoroughfares through Golden Grove and adjacent suburbs.

- Interactive map of Golden Grove
- Country: Australia
- State: South Australia
- City: Adelaide
- LGA: City of Tea Tree Gully
- Location: 6 km (3.7 mi) from Modbury, South Australia
- Established: 1850s

Government
  - State electorate: King
  - Federal division: Makin

Area
  - Total: 27.7 km^{2} (10.7 sq mi)

Population
  - Total: 10,299 (SAL 2021)
- Postcode: 5125
Suburbs around Golden Grove
Salisbury Heights	Greenwith
Salisbury East	Golden Grove	Yatala Vale
Wynn Vale	Surrey Downs	Fairview Park

Golden Grove is an outer north-eastern suburb of Adelaide, South Australia, within the City of Tea Tree Gully.

Developed in the 1980s as a public-private joint venture, it's noted for its hilly topography, extensive vegetation, and proximity to the Adelaide Hills.

Golden Grove has an irregular shape and shares borders with Wynn Vale, Surrey Downs, Greenwith, Yatala Vale, Fairview Park and Salisbury East. Some of these adjacent suburbs were also developed along with Golden Grove beginning in the 1980s.

== History ==
Captain Adam Robertson and his wife arrived in South Australia in September 1839, and settled in the area now known as Golden Grove. He donated an acre (4,000 m^{2}) of land to people of the area in 1853 in order for them to build a school they were planning. He allowed the area to be named Golden Grove, after the last ship he commanded. However, in 1859, he rejected a proposal from local postal authorities to formally name the township Golden Grove. His appeal was unsuccessful.

Freestone quarries in the area were used from early settlement days to provide building materials.

In 1930, the Golden Grove house and farm were sold. Most of the estate was later purchased by a sand mining company, Boral, in 1972. In 1973, the South Australian Land Commission began acquiring land in Golden Grove and Wynn Vale with a view to developing more housing.

In 1983 the South Australian Urban Land Trust contracted Delfin (now Lendlease) to develop the land into a masterplanned suburb. Earthworks began in May 1985, with land sales following in October. More than 200 allotments were sold in the first week. The final allotment in Golden Grove was sold in 2002, marking the closure of the development's sales branch.

Spring Hill Estate, an elevated subdivision located between The Golden Way and Golden Grove Road, was initially marketed as Golden Grove's answer to West Lake's Delfin Island—likely in response to the success of the exclusive subdivision concept.

Delfin offered larger allotments in Spring Hill Estate, limiting access to entrances via Spring Hill Drive and Martindale Avenue only. Through traffic is discouraged through the use of cul-de-sacs and nonlinear roadways. Design guidelines encouraged expansive homes featuring considered architectural design within the estate.

Two wells, located at what is now the intersection of Hancock Road and Golden Grove Road, serviced farms and dairies in Golden Grove and Yatala Vale, and provided water for council work and firefighting. The last well was filled in during March 1995 after having been dry for many years.

The development phase of the Golden Grove scheme spanned from 1983 to 2003, for a total duration of 20 years.

== Subsequent housing developments ==
=== The Settlement ===
In 2007, South Australian home builder Fairmont Homes commenced work on a subdivision to the north of Golden Grove and Crouch Roads named "The Settlement". In total, approx. 220 allotments were released.

Housing typology largely reflects that of the original Golden Grove development, continuing the detached, single-family home characteristic previously observed.

The subdivision also features The Stables shopping centre, a nursing home, and a retirement village.

Within the development area sits Captain Robertson's original homestead.

=== 2023 State Government land release ===
In April 2023, the Government of South Australia announced the release of a land parcel in Golden Grove to address the ongoing housing crisis facing the state. The land, previously privately owned and later rezoned for residential use, is expected to accommodate an additional 500 homes.

=== Luminaire Estate ===
In late-2023, South Australian home builder Metricon commenced work on a small subdivision between Aristotle Close and Golden Grove Road. 48 allotments were initially released. The subdivision had entirely sold out by November 2024, with home construction continuing into 2025.

== Geography ==
The boundary of Golden Grove is defined by Slate and Cobbler Creeks to the north, the Cobbler Creek Park to the west, Helicon Drive, Surrey Farm Drive and The Grove Way (including the three-school campus and shopping centre), Golden Grove and Hancock Roads (wrapping around Surrey Downs) and Yatala Vale Road to the south, and Seaview Road and the quarries to the east.

== Facilities ==
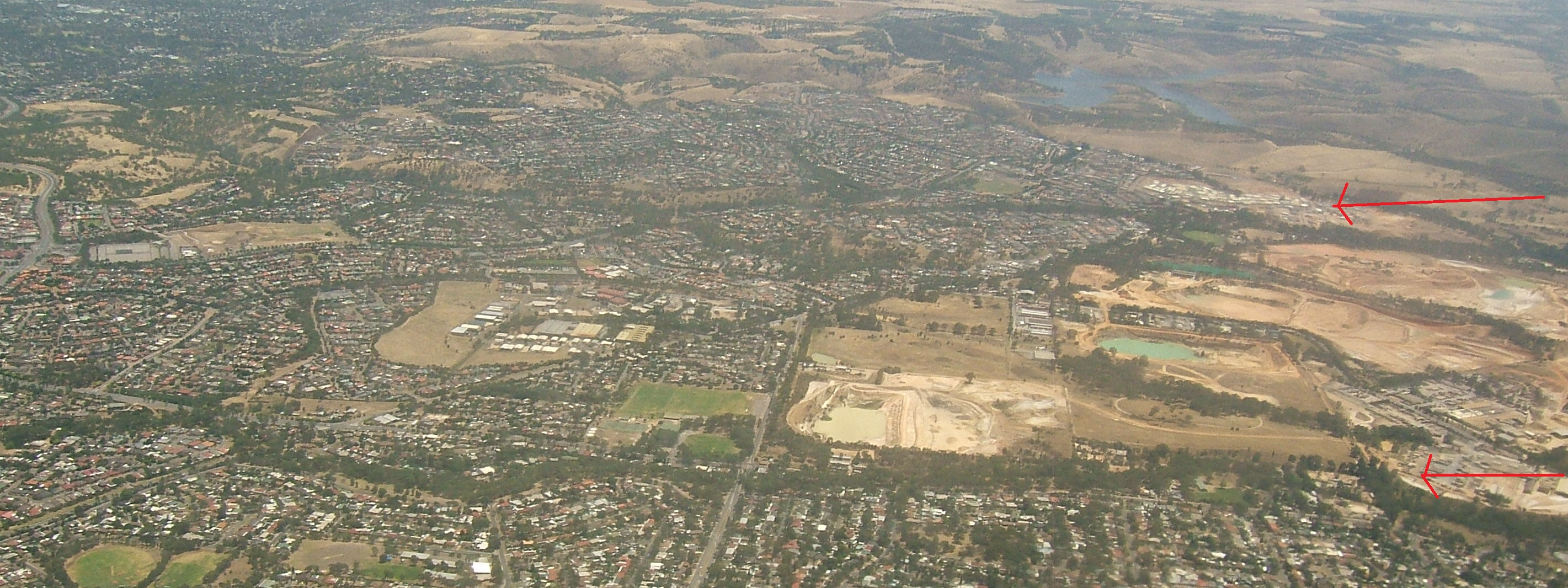
Aerial image of the Golden Grove and Greenwith areas, looking north. Greenwith is to the north, and the border is Cobbler Creek, which is straddled by a treeline indicated by the upper red arrow. The southern border of Golden Grove is indicated approximately by the southern treeline marked by the arrow. The triangle in the southwestern corner of the photo is Surrey Downs, and to the southeastern corner is Fairview Park. Little Para Reservoir is the body of water. The light patches on the eastern part of the image are quarries.

The three major high schools in the area are Gleeson College, Pedare Christian College and Golden Grove High School in the suburb's southwestern corner. They are linked together in a complex that also includes the Golden Grove Recreation Centre. Golden Grove Primary School and Pedare Primary Campus are also located in the suburb.

The Grove Shopping Centre (previously "Golden Grove Village") has a number of retailers, including Big W, Woolworths, Drakes as well as dining, specialty stores and banks. It was built by Sabemo.

A police station was opened on 18 December 2006.

2010 saw the opening of the Harpers Field complex, adjacent to One Tree Hill Road & Crouch Road. The Harpers Field clubrooms and community centre's $14 million re-development was completed in June 2024 and is currently home to the Golden Grove Football Club and Golden Grove Cricket Club

The 288ha Cobbler Creek Recreation Park is accessible from nearby Gulfview Heights.

== Transport ==
There is a bus interchange at the Golden Grove Village, which is operated by Adelaide Metro. On 10 November 2020, a total of $33 million was funded by the South Australian state government to provide for a new Adelaide Metro Park & Ride facility in Golden Grove. The facility provides for bus stop 62A The Grove Way, a connecting stop to and from the Adelaide O'Bahn bus corridor. The project has been completed as part of the PTP Allowance and the Department for Infrastructure & Transport. The Park 'n' Ride was set to account for the large patronage the area sees of bus commuters toward the Adelaide CBD and surrounding suburbs. Construction began in April 2021. The project saw new Adelaide Metro signage erected and the final phases of completion throughout February and March 2022. It was officially opened on 7 March 2022. Proposals exist to extend the O-Bahn to Golden Grove, but the route it might take from Tea Tree Plaza Interchange is unknown.

== See also ==
- City of Tea Tree Gully
- List of Adelaide suburbs
