= Para Vista, South Australia =

Para Vista
- Suburb
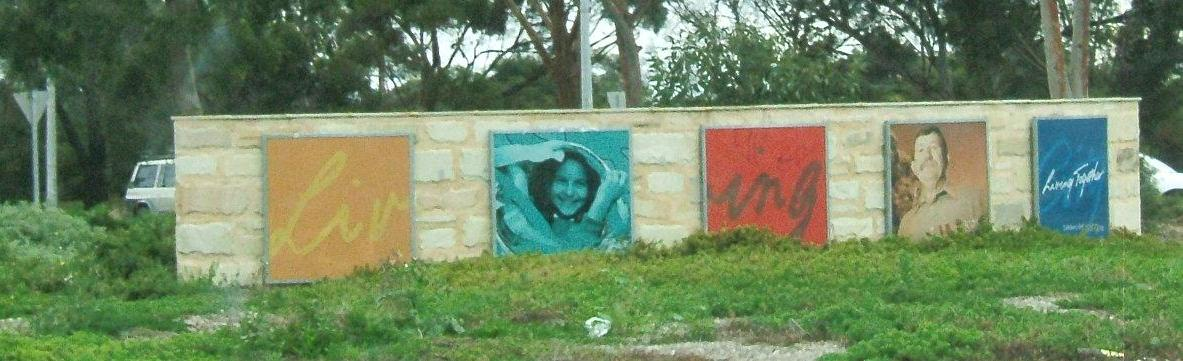
- Entrance signage to Para Vista

- Coordinates: 34°49′36″S 138°39′54″E
- Country: Australia
- State: South Australia
- City: Adelaide
- LGA: City of Salisbury

Government
  - State electorate: Florey
  - Federal division: Makin

Population
  - Total: 3,023 (SAL 2021)
- Postcode: 5093
Suburbs around Para Vista
| | Para Hills | Modbury Heights |
| Ingle Farm | Para Vista | Modbury |
| | Valley View | Modbury |

Para Vista (pronounced /ˈpærə/) is a suburb in northern Adelaide, South Australia. It is bounded by Wright Road to the South. The northern boundary of the suburb is Montague, Nelson and Milne Roads, making an backwards-L shape of the suburb. The western end is Redhill Road, but the eastern side does not follow streets.

== History ==
Para Vista Post Office opened on 13 January 1964 but was renamed Valley View in October of that year.

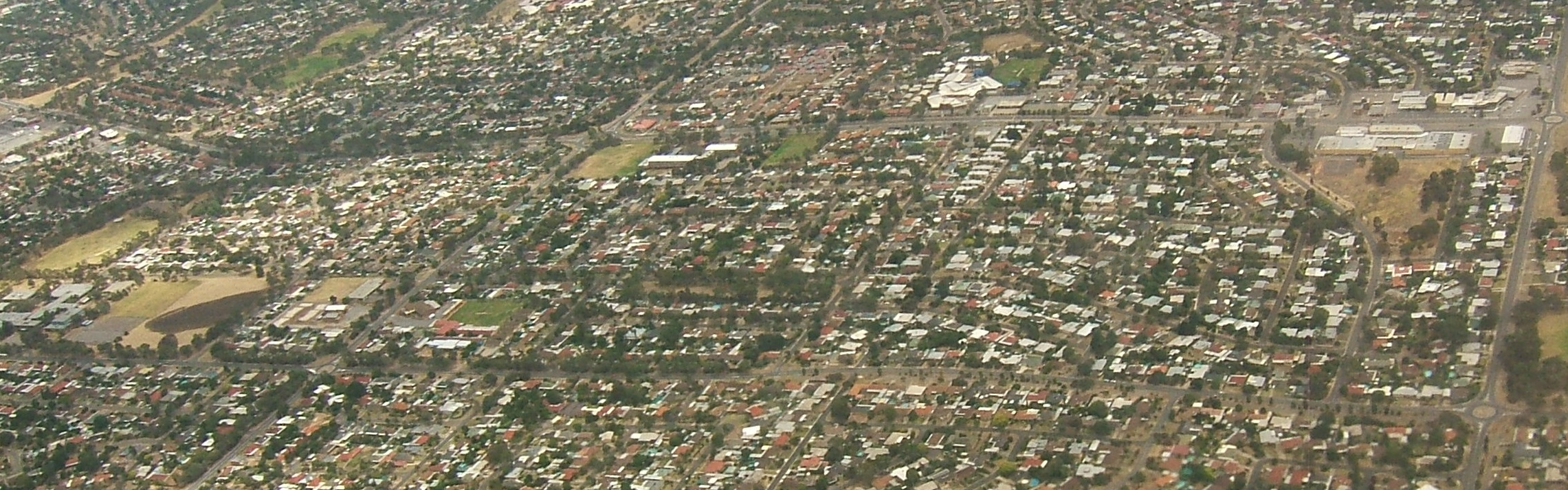
Aerial image of Para Vista, looking north; Wright Road is the east–west road at the bottom
