= Electoral district of Wright =

South Australian state electoral district

Wright South Australia—House of Assembly
- Interactive map of electoral district boundaries
- State: South Australia
- Created: 1993
- MP: Blair Boyer
- Party: Labor
- Namesake: Edmund Wright
- Electors: 28,587 (2026)
- Area: 20.0 km^{2} (7.7 sq mi)
- Demographic: Metropolitan
- Coordinates: 34°47′2″S 138°41′14″E
Electorates around Wright:
Ramsay	King	King
Florey	Wright	Newland
Florey	Newland	Newland

Footnotes
- Electoral District map

Wright is a single-member electoral district for the South Australian House of Assembly. Named after the esteemed 19th century South Australian architect Edmund Wright, it is a suburban electorate in Adelaide's outer north-east, taking in the suburbs of Gulfview Heights, Modbury Heights, Redwood Park and Wynn Vale, as well as parts of Modbury North, Salisbury East and Surrey Downs.

== History ==
When created, Wright was a marginal Labor seat at the 1991 electoral distribution, taking in much of the abolished seat of Briggs. Wright was first contested at the 1993 election, where it was won by Liberal candidate Scott Ashenden as part of a large swing throughout the state. He was defeated at the 1997 election by Labor candidate Jennifer Rankine.

Rankine announced in February 2017 that she would be retiring from parliament as of the 2018 election.

== Members for Wright ==
Member	Party	Term
Scott Ashenden	Liberal	1993–1997
Jennifer Rankine	Labor	1997–2018
Blair Boyer	Labor	2018–present

== Election results ==
2026 South Australian state election: Wright
Party	Candidate	Votes	%	±%
Labor	Blair Boyer	11,939	48.1	−3.7
One Nation	Sean Porter	7,062	28.5	+28.5
Liberal	Carston Keong-Woodhouse	2,170	8.8	−23.2
Greens	Samantha Skinner	2,145	8.6	+0.3
Family First	Sue Nancarrow	672	2.7	−4.5
Animal Justice	Deb Horley	373	1.5	+1.5
Australian Family	Robin Hill	352	1.4	+1.4
United Voice	Rosalind Wilton	107	0.4	+0.4
Total formal votes		24,820	95.8	−1.4
Informal votes		1,079	4.2	+1.4
Turnout		25,899	90.6	−0.1
Two-candidate-preferred result
Labor	Blair Boyer	15,512	62.5	+0.6
One Nation	Sean Porter	9,308	37.5	+37.5
Labor hold		Swing	+0.6	
