= Tea Tree Gully Heritage Museum =

Culture museum in South Australia

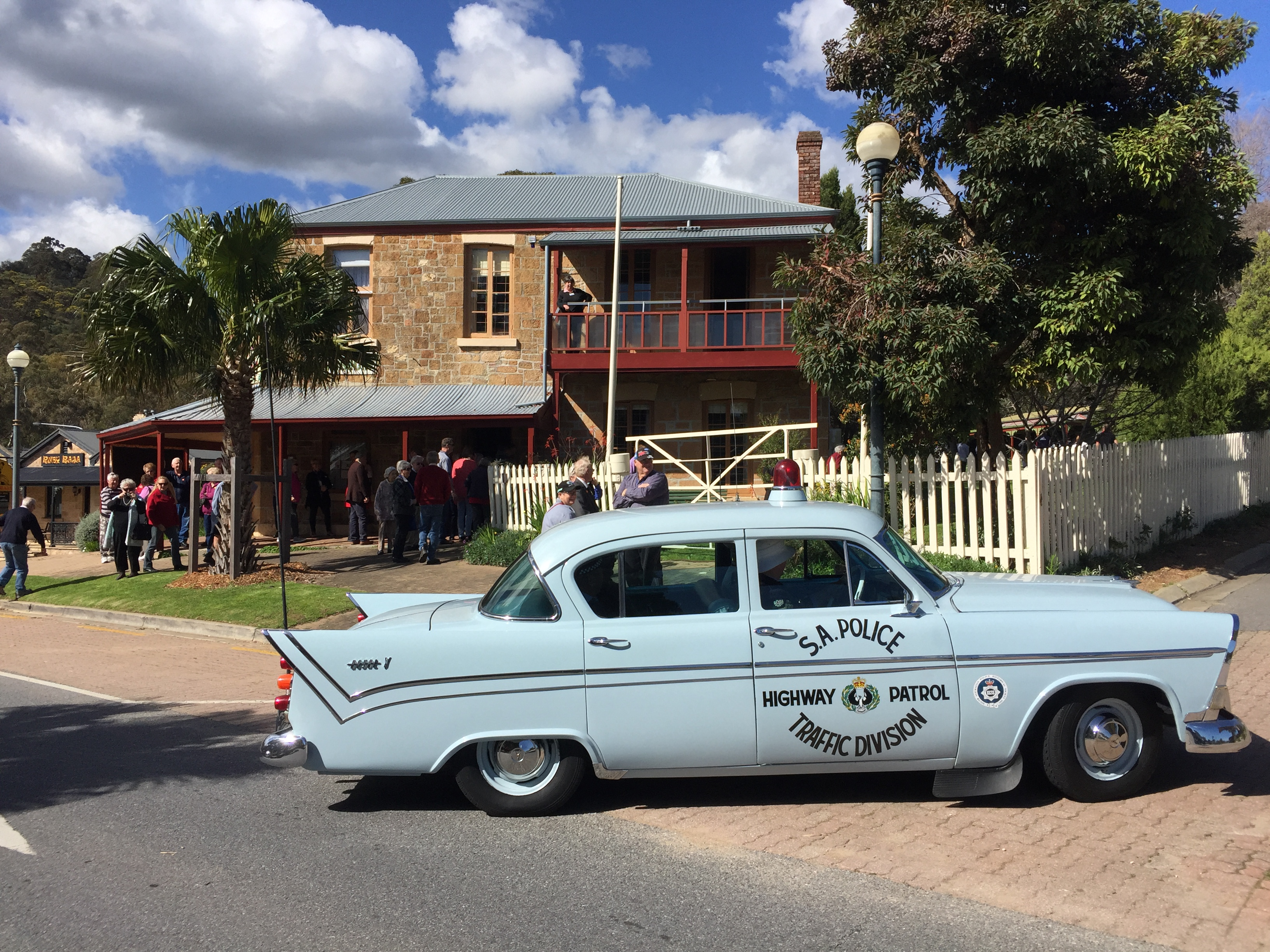
- The museum during the All Locked Up event
- Established: 1854; 172 years ago
- Location: 3 Perseverance Rd, Tea Tree Gully SA 5091, Australia
- Coordinates: 34.8221°S 138.7307°E
- Type: Culture museum
- Website: http://www.ttgmuseum.org.au/

The Tea Tree Gully Heritage Museum, formerly the Highercombe Hotel is a local history museum located in Tea Tree Gully, South Australia. It is managed and maintained by volunteer members of the Tea Tree Gully Branch of the National Trust of South Australia. The museum deals with the history of the Tea Tree Gully (Steventon) area of South Australia. The main building was formed as the Highercombe Hotel in 1854, then served as the Tea Tree Gully Post Office and Telegraph Station from May 1880 and was made into a museum in 1965 to save the building.

The museum offers regular Heritage on Sunday events with varying themes throughout the year, along with school and group tours. Ghost tours occasionally operate at night.

The museum is Accredited in the Museums and Collections (MaC) program of the History Trust of South Australia.

== History ==
=== Highercombe Hotel ===
The Highercombe Hotel was built in 1854. Its first licensee was William Haines, who served as District Clerk of Tea Tree Gully Council for 37 years and Member of Parliament for 6 years. The State Government purchased the building in 1879 and it was used from 1880 to 1963 as a post and telegraph office. During this period part of the building was used as a school classroom and accommodation for Headmasters' and the Postmasters' families. From 1963 to 1967 the Tea Tree Gully Council used it as an office and library.

=== Tea Tree Gully Heritage Museum ===
At the request of citizens, the National Trust took over the building in 1967. Volunteers formed the National Trust of South Australia (NTSA) Tea Tree Gully Branch and museum contents were donated by local residents. The Tea Tree Gully Branch restored it and converted it to a heritage museum. It was initially known as the Old Highercombe Hotel Folk Museum and later the Old Highercombe Hotel Museum
