= Banksia Park International High School =

Location
- 610 Milne Road,Banksia Park, Adelaide, South Australia; Australia; 34°48′54″S 138°43′35″E

Information
- Type: Government international secondary school
- Motto: Be the best version of ourselves
- Established: 1973; 53 years ago
- Principal: Natasa Parhas
- Website: www.bpihs.sa.edu.au

Banksia Park International High School is a government international secondary school in Banksia Park, a suburb of Adelaide, South Australia. It has about 1000 students. The school has a large and well-established international programme, started in 2000, and is accredited as an International High School by the Council of International Schools.

== Overview ==
It has sister-school arrangements with schools in China, Japan, Korea and Vietnam, but also hosts students from many other countries, such as Germany and the United States.

The school's Global Citizen Medal program, introduced in 2003, is intended to encourage students to value themselves and their contributions to the community and to prepare for a future as well-rounded and important citizens. Applicants for the Global Citizen Medal make presentations to a panel about an issue that they feel passionate about. External recognition of this program has included a $10,000 grant in the 2004 National Awards for Quality Schooling with a commendation from the Australian Government for the school's achievements in civics and citizenship. As of 2005 the program was being introduced to six other area schools and their students. Banksia Park won a 2005 Community Merit Award from the Australian Scholarships Group.

It is one of the five schools in South Australia to be accredited as a specialist entrepreneurial school. It delivers learning programs that promote and encourage entrepreneurial mindsets in students.

== See also ==
- List of schools in South Australia
