= Tea Tree Gully, South Australia =

Tea Tree Gully
- Suburb
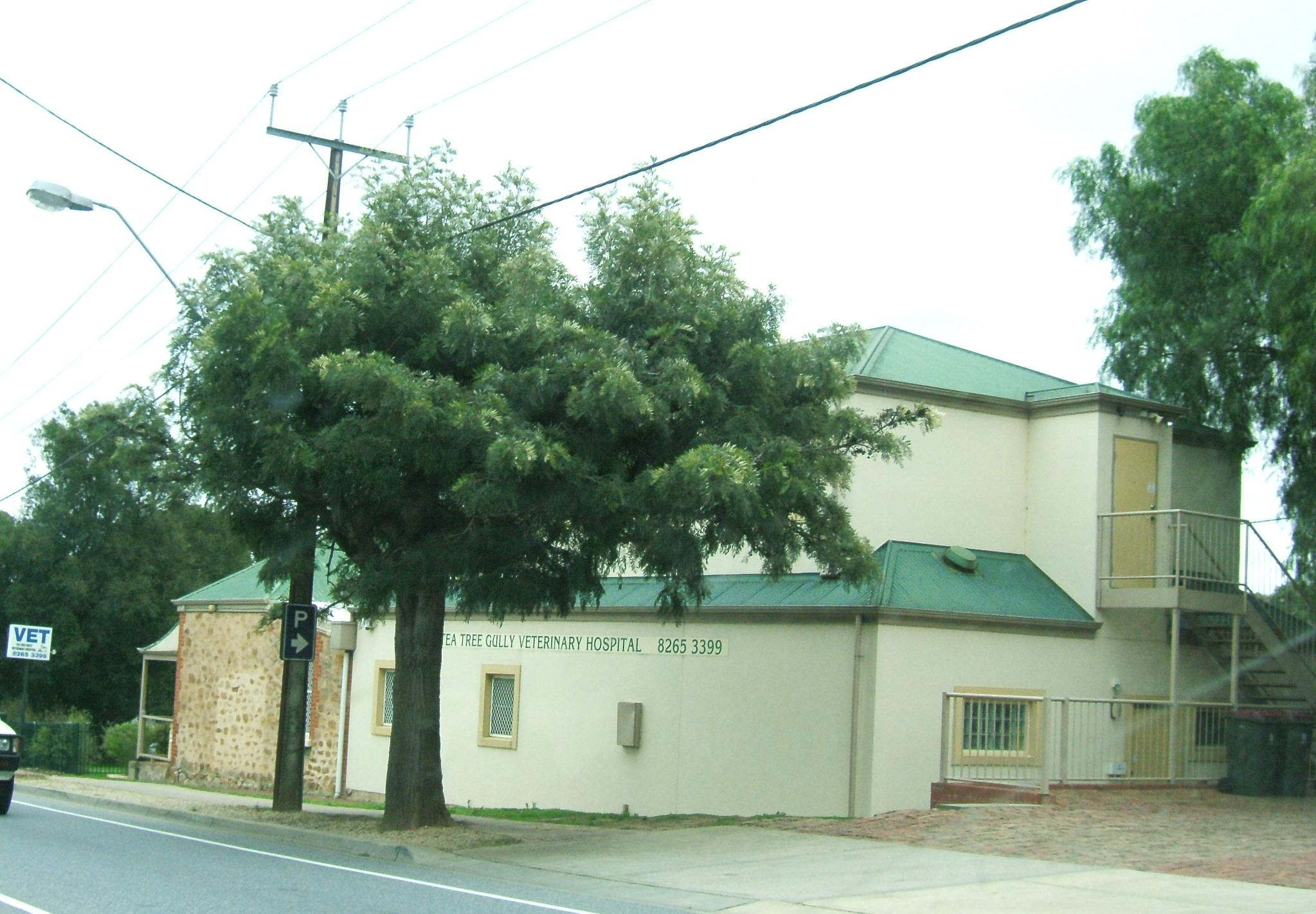

- Coordinates: 34°49′30″S 138°43′53″E
- Country: Australia
- State: South Australia
- Region: Northern Adelaide
- City: Adelaide
- LGA: City of Tea Tree Gully
- Location: 22 km (14 mi) from Adelaide CBD

Government
  - State electorate: Newland
  - Federal division: Makin

Population
  - Total: 3,499 (SAL 2021)
- Time zone: UTC+9:30 (ACST)
  - Summer (DST): UTC+10:30 (ACST)
- Postcode: 5091
- County: Adelaide
Suburbs around Tea Tree Gully
Redwood Park	Banksia Park; Upper Hermitage	Houghton
Ridgehaven; St Agnes	Tea Tree Gully	Houghton
St Agnes	Vista; Houghton	Houghton

Tea Tree Gully (TTG) is a suburb in the greater Adelaide, South Australia area, under the City of Tea Tree Gully. Tea Tree Gully is in the City of Tea Tree Gully local government area, the South Australian House of Assembly electoral district of Newland and the Australian House of Representatives Division of Makin.

== History ==
The suburb acquired its name from the white flowered 'tea trees' (Leptospermum lanigerum) that grew in the gully. Their leaves were brewed as a tea substitute by early settlers. John Stevens originally purchased land in the area, subdividing it in 1850 and naming the settlement Steventon. By 1867 the settlement was known variously as Tea Tree Gully or Steventon, but Steventon had dropped from common usage by 1900. It was also sometimes known as "Teatree Gully".

Steventon Post Office opened around January 1859, was renamed Tea Tree Gully in 1872, Teatree Gully in 1925, Tea Tree Gully again in 1966 and St Agnes in 1969.

The gully is a notable one, as it provided a gradient negotiable by bullock wagons travelling through the Mount Lofty Ranges and it had permanent springs which promoted the growth of tea tree.

The historic Highercombe Hotel in Perseverance Road and the Old Tea Tree Gully Council Chambers in Haines Road are listed on the South Australian Heritage Register.

=== Highercombe Hotel ===
The Highercombe Hotel was built in 1854. Its first licensee was William Haines, who served as District Clerk of Tea Tree Gully council for 37 years and Member of Parliament for 6 years. The State Government purchased the building in 1879 and it was used from 1880 to 1963 as a post and telegraph office. During this period part of the building was used as a school classroom, and accommodation for Headmasters' and the Postmasters' families. From 1963 to 1967 the Tea Tree Gully Council used it as an office and library. The National Trust took over the building in 1967 and their Tea Tree Gully branch restored it and converted it to a heritage museum.
