= Para Hills, South Australia =

Para Hills
- Suburb
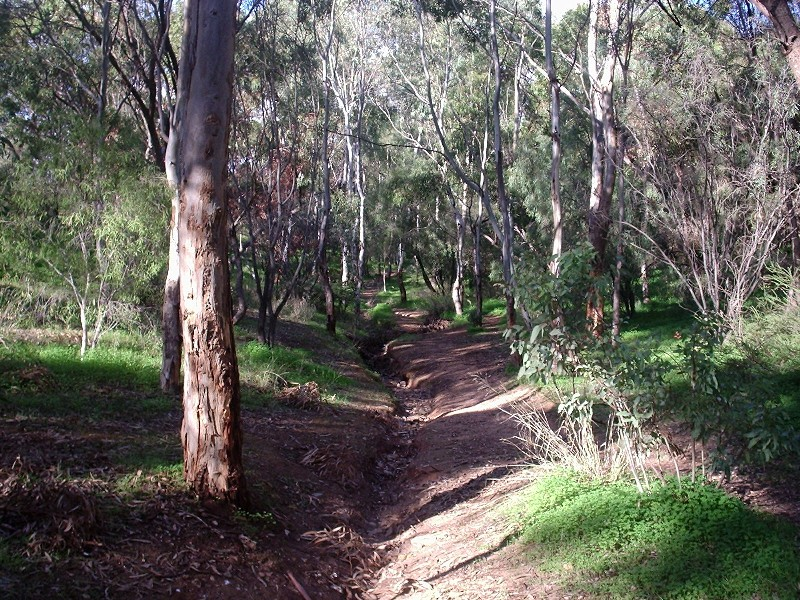
- A gully next to Para Hills primary school

- Country: Australia
- State: South Australia
- City: Adelaide
- LGAs: City of Salisbury; City of Tea Tree Gully
- Location: 16 km (9.9 mi) from Adelaide
- Established: 1959

Government
  - State electorate: Playford
  - Federal division: Makin

Area
  - Total: 3.21 km^{2} (1.24 sq mi)

Population
  - Total: 6,793 (SAL 2021)
- Postcode: 5096
Suburbs around Para Hills
Salisbury East	Gulfview Heights	Wynn Vale
Para Hills West	Para Hills	Modbury Heights
Ingle Farm	Para Vista	Modbury North

Para Hills (pronounced /ˈpærə/) is a residential suburb of Adelaide, South Australia. There is a light aircraft airport close to its boundary, and numerous sporting facilities, abundant parks and schools and two medium-sized shopping centres. Most of the suburb is in the City of Salisbury, although it is partly in the City of Tea Tree Gully.

== History ==
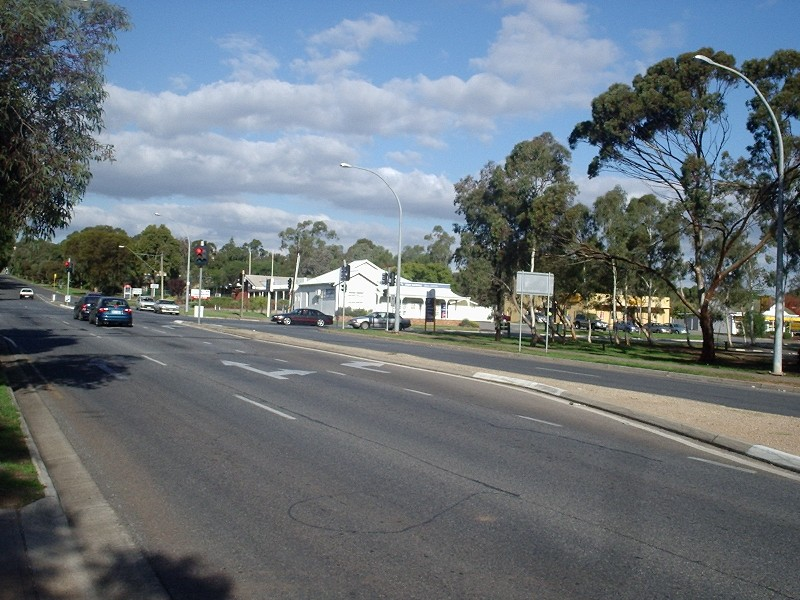
Kester's Farmhouse in 2006

The area was originally inhabited by the Kaurna tribe of Indigenous Australians. By the time the area was settled by Europeans in the 1840s, introduced diseases such as smallpox had already spread from the eastern states and decimated the population.

Land grants in the Para Hills area began in 1847. An early settler family were the Goodalls, who established a farm at the base of the hills on 12 August 1850. When Andrew Melville Goodall expanded the farm in 1853 he named the property Para Hills Farm, building a farmhouse near what is now the corner of St Clair Avenue and Goodall Road.

Other notable farming families first settling the area were the Kesters (1893), and the MacIntyres (1865). From settlement as distant farming land, to subdivision for residential development, the land increased greatly in value. The land was valued at £4.10 per acre in 1900, £16 in 1937, £420 and £1200 for some of the flatter land shortly after its subdivision.

Farming and quarrying continued as the sole activities on the land until Reid Murray Developments (R.M.D.) began acquiring land for subdivision in 1959. The development was, at the time, the largest private housing development in Australia and had a budget of £6 million. R.M.D. was not the only developer active in the suburb with most of the Goodall and McIntyre farmland being sold to, or subdivided by, other companies. In total R.M.D. purchased 430 acres (1.7 km^{2}). R.M.D. copied a new concept from the South Australian Housing Trust's new development at Elizabeth, constructing the suburb as a self-contained neighbourhood from the outset. Unusually fifteen percent of the land was set aside for parks, arrangements were made with Woolworths (S.A.) Ltd to provide a supermarket, and with the State government for the speedy provision of a post office and school. Land allotments were set to a minimum of 697 square metres (7,502 sq ft) and, to transform the bare farm land, a street tree-planting and nursery program was begun with new residents being given six plants to start a garden. R.M.D. did not sell any vacant land, but only complete house, land and some furnishings packages (prices ranging from £4,000 to £5,500). The houses all had three or more bedrooms, flat corrugated iron or angled tile roofs, and were constructed from bricks, modular concrete blocks or Mount Gambier freestone.

R.M.D. set up offices in London to attract new British migrants prior to their trip to Australia. Salesmen met new immigrants at Fremantle dock. Flats were built in Barcoo Street to temporarily house intending purchasers, many of whom were travelling under assisted passage. Some settlers were not prepared for the frontier conditions they met, with no amenities or trees, and surroundings of little more than open paddocks. Many of the migrants came from established cities, and expressed dismay at the prospect of having to form a community from scratch. A vendor finance scheme was begun allowing some newlyweds to purchase homes with a deposit as low as £500. An extensive marketing effort to sell the homes included, a home donated to the crippled children's association, subsidised bus services, free use of the olympic size swimming pool for residents, twenty-five furnished display homes and £10,000 of Television advertising.

The suburb developed quickly, fifty-five homes completed in the first six months and seventy under construction, along with sealed roads, storm water and sewerage services and gas and electricity supply. All three original farming families have main roads in Para Hills named after them. The farmhouse of Allen Kesters (built in 1934) is still in use, on the corner of Kesters and Bridge roads as a real-estate office, and the McIntyre farmhouse was, as of 1985, occupied by the McIntyre family.

Para Hills was used to showcase an 'expandable house' that allowed for rooms to be added in four stages. The house was part of the Housing Trust of South Australia's demonstration village, which opened in 1982.

=== Timeline ===
- 29 October 1846, Hundred of Yatala proclaimed and area divided into sections.
- July 1847, First land grants acquired.
- 1850, Goodall family acquire a land grant and begin farming.
- 1852, McIntyre family begin leasing farming land.
- 1893, Kesters family acquire land and establish a farm.
- 1911, First (two-inch) water main laid down Kesters Road.
- 1934, Allen Kester's house built on the corner of Kesters and Bridge Road.
- 1950s (year unknown), Electricity supply begun after formation of the Electricity Trust of South Australia.
- 1959, All Kesters family land purchased by R.M.D.
- 25 February 1960, Construction of first house begun with pouring of the concrete foundation.
- 2 August 1960, Premier Sir Thomas Playford officially opens the new housing estate.
- February 1961, First school lessons begin in pre-fabricated classrooms in the site of current day Para Hills Primary School.
- March 1961, 100th family arrives in the Para Hills estate.
- 27 June 1961, First scouting meeting with the formation of a cub pack.
- 24 February 1962, 1/2 Olympic size swimming pool and community hall opened.
- September 1963, Presbyterian Church on the corner of Barcoo Streets and Liberman roads begins services.
- 12 September 1963, Shopping centre opens on Wilkinson Road.
- 1964, Goodall farm including Para Hills farm purchased by R.M.D.
- 1964, Para Hills Farm's farmhouse demolished to make way for subdivision.
- 17 June 1968, First Para Hills library opened by Premier Steele Hall.
- 27 April 1972, Para Hills police station opens
- 1976, Population reaches 11,213.

== Demography ==
Historical population
Year	Pop.	±%
2001	9,034	—
2006	7,722	−14.5%
2011	7,594	−1.7%
2016	6,554	−13.7%
2021	6,793	+3.6%

According to the 2021 census of Australia, Para Hills has a population of 6.793, of which 51.7% is male and 48.3% is female. The median age is 36, two years below the national average of 38. The most common ancestries were English (36.1%), Australian (29.1%), German (6.4%), Scottish (6.1%) and Irish (5.9%). The most common countries of birth include Australia (64.7%), England (6.7%), India (4.8%), Afghanistan (2.8%), the Philippines (1.6%) and Vietnam (0.9%). 69.4% of the population only spoke english at home. Other commonly spoken languages were Arabic (3.0%), Hazaraghi and Punjabi (both 2.4%) and Vietnamese and Hindi (both 1.1%).

== Landscape ==
=== Geology ===
Para Hills is built on an escarpment of the Para Fault Block at the edge of the Adelaide plains, rising 61 metres (200 ft) above the plains. The formation of this escarpment has led to short, steep-sided gullies which are characteristic of Para Hills. The gullies are usually dry, running only shortly after rain, and have mostly been left as public parks. Outcrops of exposed pre-Cambrian rocks have been quarried for use in roadmaking and construction since the late 19th century. The outcrops within Para Hills are not extensive and only one quarry operated in the suburb's residential area.

=== Flora ===
Para hills street map

Prior to subdivision there is very little recorded about the vegetation of the hills. What records exist report that the plains where mostly covered in kangaroo grass, with the hills being lightly covered in Eucalyptus Porosa (Mallee box), Acacia paradoxa (Kangaroo thorn wattle) and Acacia pyncantha (Golden Wattle). Public parks in para hills are now landscaped with Australian native vegetation. Most of the streets show Salisbury council's practice of lining roadsides with Eucalypts, Acacias and other Australian native trees.

=== Geography ===
The boundary of Para Hills is defined by McIntyre Road and the Para Hills reserve to the north, Kelly Road to the east, Bridge Road to the west, and Maxwell Road and Milne Road to the south. The northern boundary moved south from Wynn Vale Drive in 2002 when Gulfview Heights was declared.

== Facilities ==
Para Hills Post Office opened on 28 June 1961.

The Catholic Church in the suburb is dedicated to the Holy Trinity.

== Transport ==
The suburb is accessible from Adelaide by bus, (partly using Adelaide's O-Bahn Busway). A train station is approximately 2 kilometres to the west.

Public transport began in 1961 with a once-daily, privately run, return bus service to Adelaide. The service was run by "Lewis Brothers", initially with a £60 weekly subsidy from Reid Murray Developments. By 1974, when the Municipal Tramways Trust took over all buses and services in Para Hills, it had expanded to 44 buses and numerous routes.

Bus routes in Para Hills provide connections to Elizabeth Shopping Centre, Lyell McEwin Hospital, Royal Adelaide Hospital, Women's and Children's Hospital and Westfield Tea Tree Plaza.

== See also ==
- List of Adelaide suburbs
