= Wynn Vale, South Australia =

Wynn Vale
- Suburb
- Coordinates: 34.802°S 138.690°E
- Country: Australia
- State: South Australia
- City: Adelaide
- LGA: City of Tea Tree Gully
- Location: 5 km (3.1 mi) from Modbury
- Established: 1985

Government
  - State electorate: Wright
  - Federal division: Makin

Area
  - Total: 4.4 km^{2} (1.7 sq mi)

Population
  - Total: 7,865 (SAL 2021)
- Postcode: 5127
Suburbs around Wynn Vale
Salisbury East	Golden Grove	Golden Grove
Gulfview Heights	Wynn Vale	Surrey Downs
Para Hills	Modbury Heights	Redwood Park

Wynn Vale is an outer north-eastern suburb of Adelaide, South Australia and is located within the City of Tea Tree Gully local government area. It is adjacent to Golden Grove, Modbury Heights, Surrey Downs, Salisbury East and Para Hills. It is located approximately 20 km north-east of the Adelaide central business district.

Wynn Vale has grown quickly through the years as a part of the Golden Grove development by Delfin. Originally, the area in and around Wynn Vale was a winery called Modbury Estate, which was owned by S Wynn & Company.

== History ==
Wynn Vale and Golden Grove were founded by Captain Adam Robertson, and were originally known together as Modbury Estate, a winery owned by S Wynn & Company. The vineyards were planted with white grapes, which were used for making sherries and quality dry white wines. In 1972 the South Australian government created the South Australian Land Commission, which was formed to evaluate land suitable for the construction of thousands of dwellings for Adelaide's growing population. On 17 October 1974 the South Australian Land Commission bought 390 hectares of land in the region.

On 20 December 1984, over 10 years later, Delfin and the South Australian Urban Land Trust were named as joint developers. Construction work began in May 1985. The suburb of Wynn Vale was named after the original land owner of the property, S. Wynn.

== Geography and population ==
The boundary of Wynn Vale is defined by The Grove Way, Surrey Farm Drive and Helicon Drive (wrapping around the three-school campus and shopping centre) to the north, The Golden Way and Grenfell Road in the south and Golden Grove Road in the east.

According to the Australian Bureau of Statistics 1991 Census, Wynn Vale had a population of 6,820 people, living in 2,330 dwellings. By 1996, at the height of the local land development, Wynn Vale's population had expanded to 8,783 people living in 2,953 dwellings. In 2001, the ABS reported a drop in the population to 8,611 people, living in 3,039 dwellings. By 2006, the population had dropped again, to 8,414 people, residing in 3,152 dwellings. Data collected in the 2011 Census details the continuing trend of a falling population, with 8,001 people recorded residing in 3,179 dwellings. Data collected in the 2016 Census details the trend of a still falling population, with 7,763 people recorded residing in 3,178 dwellings.

== Surrounding facilities ==
Wynn Vale Dam, located in the heart of the suburb, offers several riding and walking trails, as does the connecting Dry Creek corridor and wetland area. There is also a City of Tea Tree Gully owned community centre, featuring a tennis court, two playgrounds, and a small pond. Several local schools exist in the area, including Golden Grove Lutheran Primary School, St Francis Xavier's Catholic School, Wynn Vale School, Keithcot Farm Primary School and King's Baptist Grammar School. The Sunnybrook shopping centre is located within Wynn Vale, adjacent to The Golden Way, and offers a supermarket, surgery, and a variety of fast food outlets.

On Wynn Vale's northern border, in Golden Grove, are Gleeson College, Pedare Christian College and Golden Grove High School, linked together in a complex that also includes the Golden Grove Recreation and Arts Centre. The Golden Grove Village Shopping Centre is also adjacent to Wynn Vale, and serves as the main shopping outlet for the entire district.

The 288ha Cobbler Creek Recreation Park is accessible from nearby Gulfview Heights.

== Transport ==
The M44 and 545 bus routes service Wynn Vale, as well as a bus interchange at the Golden Grove Village, which is operated by Adelaide Metro.

== Activities ==
Many opportunities exist for junior sport in Wynn Vale. Several football and cricket clubs are located nearby, while the Golden Grove Recreation and Arts Centre offers netball, basketball, volleyball, indoor soccer, and squash facilities. There are also many reserves and open parks, as well as walking trails around Wynn Vale Dam, Spring Hill, and the Dry Creek corridor.
