= Highbury, South Australia =

Highbury
- Suburb
- Country: Australia
- State: South Australia
- City: Adelaide
- LGA: City of Tea Tree Gully
- Established: 1857

Government
  - State electorate: Morialta
  - Federal division: Sturt

Population
  - Total: 6,956 (SAL 2021)
- Postcode: 5089
Suburbs around Highbury
Hope Valley	Hope Valley	Vista
Dernancourt	Highbury	Paracombe
Paradise	Athelstone	Montacute

Highbury is a suburb of Adelaide South Australia in the City of Tea Tree Gully in the Adelaide foothills. It is eastwardly adjacent to the suburbs of Hope Valley and Dernancourt. The River Torrens forms southern border of the suburb, with the suburbs of Paradise and Athelstone lying adjacent across the river. The eastern end of the suburb lies in the Adelaide Hills Face Zone.

== History ==
From 1858 to 1930, Highbury was a part of and locally governed by the District Council of Highercombe which also included Hope Valley, Houghton and part of Inglewood.
