= Modbury Hospital =

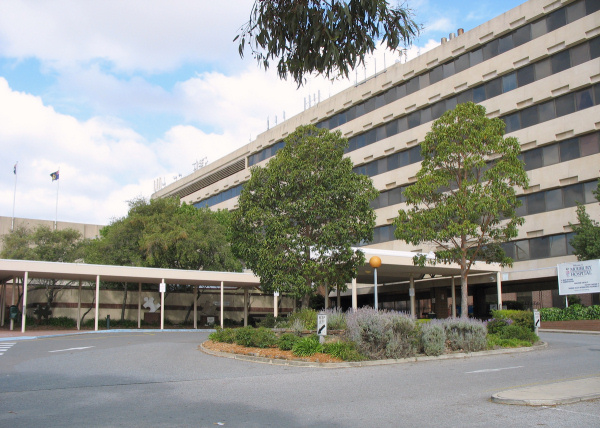
- Modbury Hospital, main entrance

Geography
- Location: North Eastern Adelaide, South Australia, Australia
- Coordinates: 34.8344°S 138.6906°E

Organisation
- Care system: Public Medicare (AU)
- Type: General

Services
- Emergency department: 24 hour
- Beds: 174

History
- Opened: 1973

Links
- Lists: Hospitals in Australia

Modbury Hospital is a hospital that provides inpatient, outpatient and emergency services to a population of over 400,000 people living primarily in Adelaide's north-eastern suburbs. Opened in 1973, Modbury Hospital is the major 24-hour and same-day elective surgery and rehabilitation hub for the north and north-eastern area. The hospital was renovated in the 2010s.
