= Modbury, South Australia =

Modbury
- Suburb
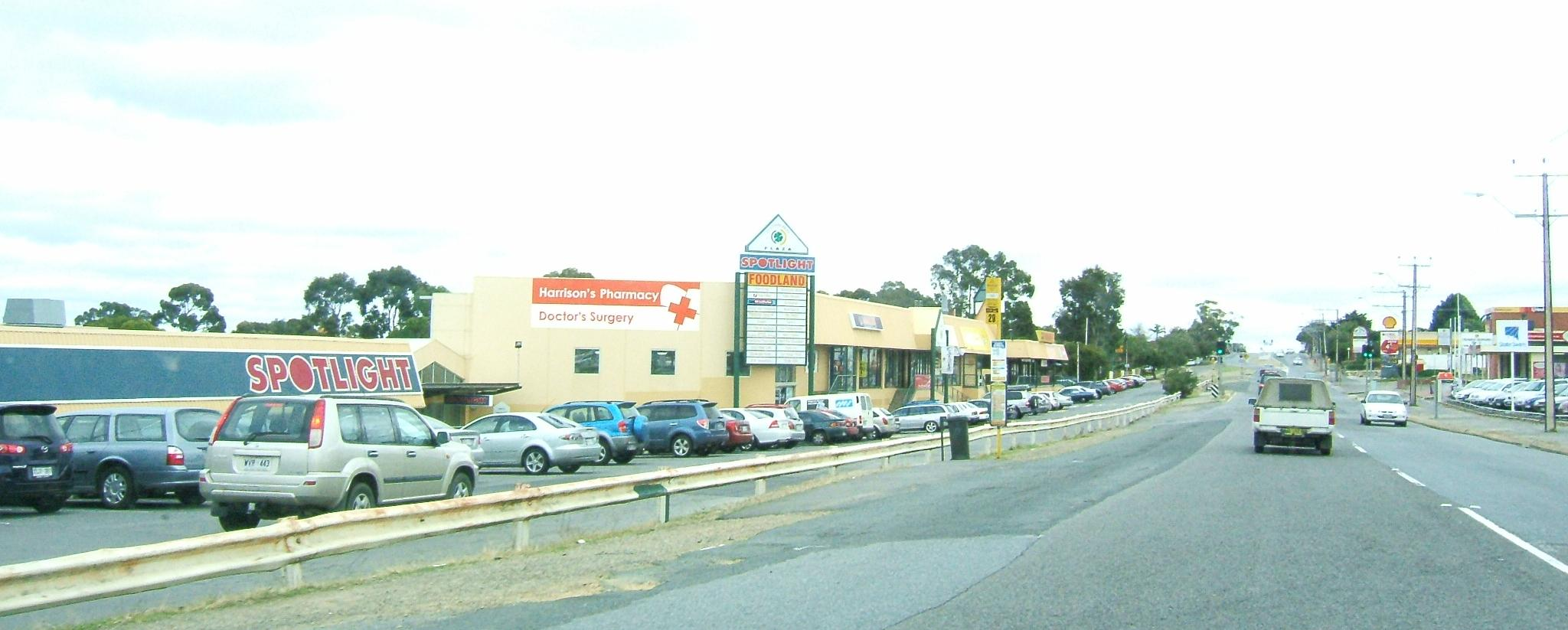
- Shopping precinct in Modbury

- Country: Australia
- State: South Australia
- City: Adelaide
- LGA: City of Tea Tree Gully
- Established: 1857

Government
  - State electorates: Florey; Newland
  - Federal division: Makin

Population
  - Total: 5,593 (SAL 2021)
- Postcode: 5092
Suburbs around Modbury
| Modbury North | Modbury Heights | Ridgehaven |
| Valley View | Modbury | St Agnes |
| Holden Hill | Hope Valley | Hope Valley |

Modbury is a suburb of Adelaide, South Australia in the City of Tea Tree Gully. Modbury is located at the end of the Adelaide O-Bahn and is home to the Tea Tree Plaza shopping complex and Modbury Hospital.

It was named Modbury by R. S. Kelly, on 1 September 1840, after his native town in Devonshire.

== History ==
Robert Simon Kelly purchased Upper Dry Creek in 1842, naming his home, trehele, later referred to as Treehill, but generally known as Modbury Farm, the Modbury hotel, initially known by the name Modbury, is widely believed to have been constructed as a two-story establishment by Robert Kelly, a tradesman, in September 1858, William Stoneham sought approval from the district council for a general license to operate a public house under the name Modbury Hotel, while Stoneham obtained the first license, ownership remained with Robert Kelly.

Mr. Kelly's efforts eventually led to the emergence of the Modbury village in 1857, after he encouraged its development on his land, which he named after his birthplace in Devonshire, England.

=== Schools ===
The suburb of Modbury contains one high school (Modbury High School) and one Primary School (Modbury West). However, there are many other schools in the surrounding areas which also bear the name Modbury. Modbury South Primary for example is located in the suburb of Hope Valley, neighbouring Modbury High School. There is also another primary school named Modbury School which was originally in Modbury proper but relocated in the 1970s to what is now known as Modbury North.

== Government ==
The suburb of Modbury is located within the Australian House of Representatives Seat of Makin, and the South Australian House of Assembly Seat of Florey.

Its local government area is the City of Tea Tree Gully and its chambers are located within the suburb.

== Sport and recreation ==
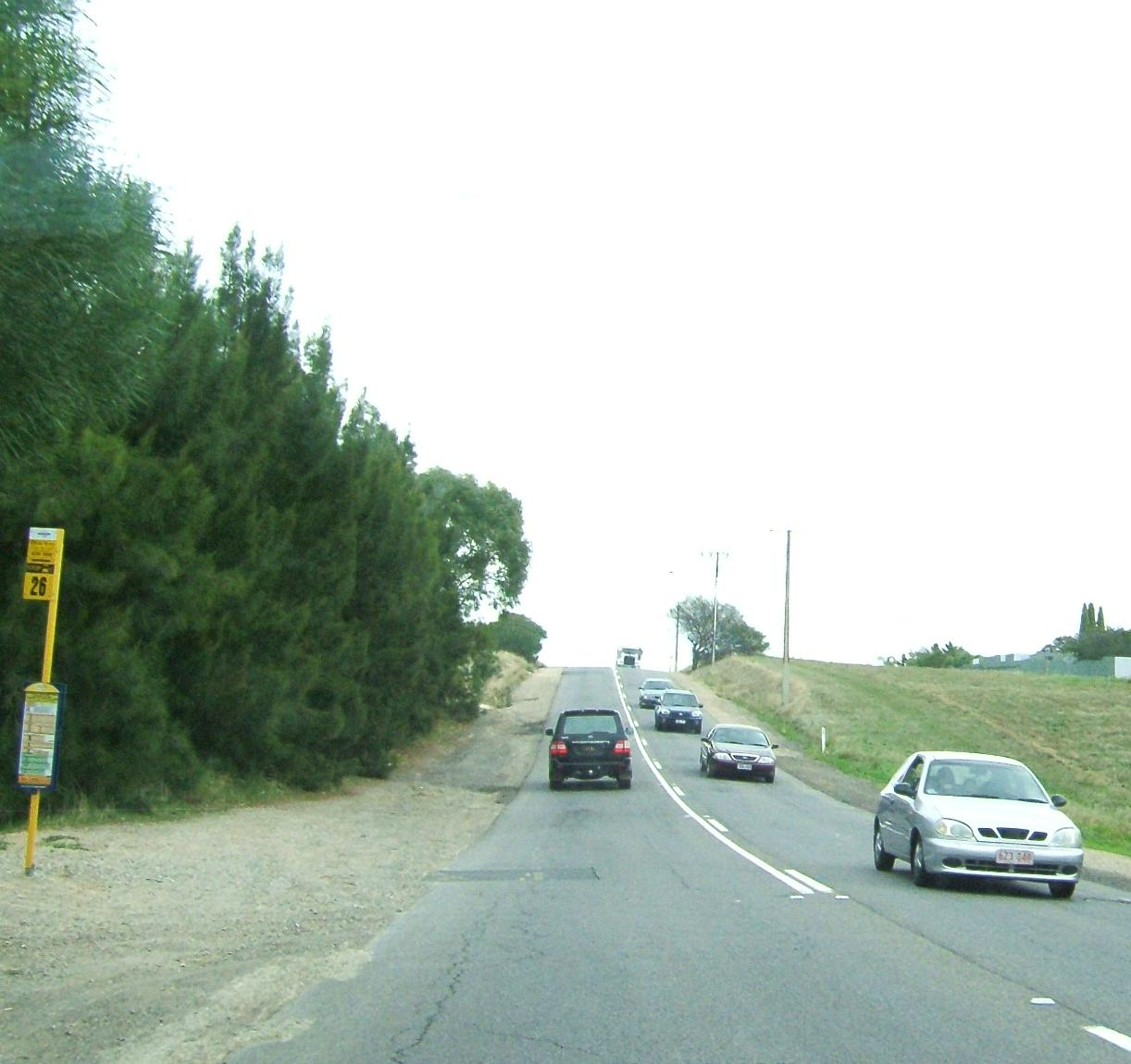
Montague Road

There are many sporting teams in Modbury - Modbury Hawks (Australian rules football), Modbury Jets (Soccer), Modbury Tennis Club and Modbury Bowling Club.

A large park central in the suburb is known as Civic Park it is located across the road from Tea Tree Plaza. It is a popular spot for barbecues and picnics in summer.

== Transport ==
The O-Bahn buses and other buses serve Modbury.

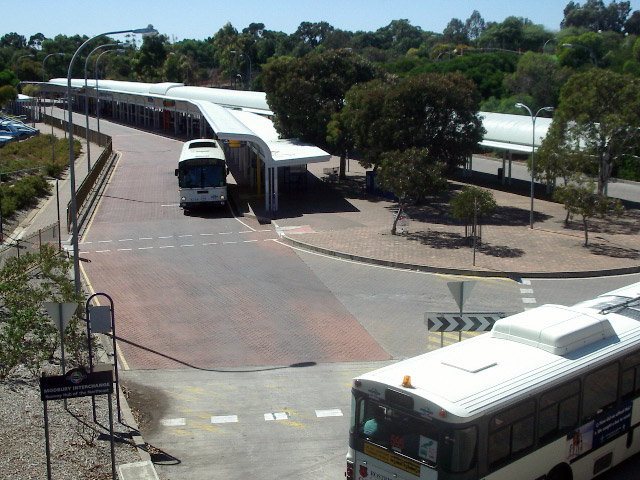
The Tee tree Plaza interchange is part of the O'Bahn
