= St Agnes, South Australia =

St Agnes
- Suburb
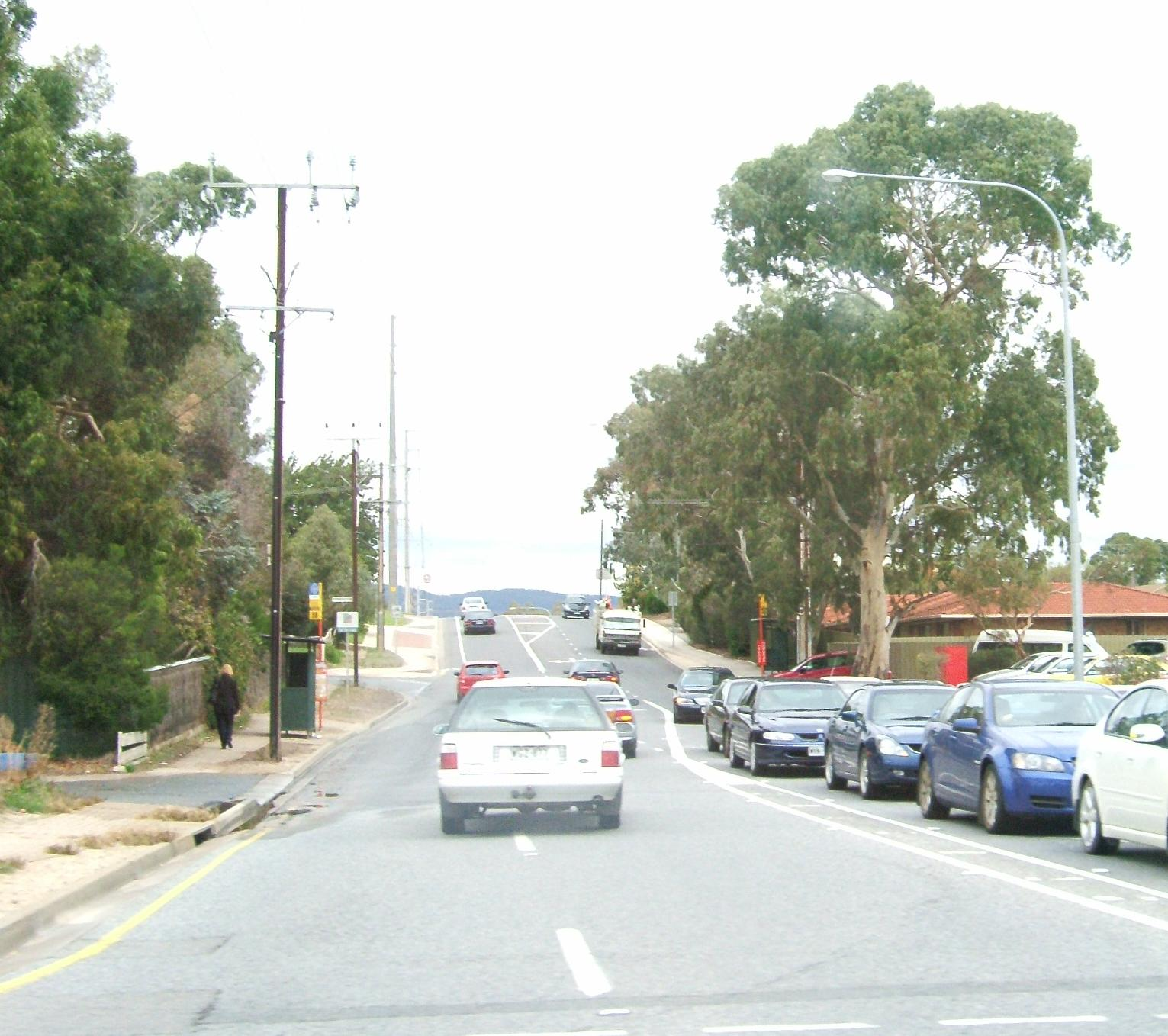
- Hancock Road

- Coordinates: 34°49′49″S 138°42′40″E
- Country: Australia
- State: South Australia
- City: Adelaide
- LGA: City of Tea Tree Gully
- Location: 15 km (9.3 mi) from Adelaide

Government
  - State electorate: Newland

Population
  - Total: 4,233 (SAL 2021)
- Postcode: 5097

St Agnes is a suburb of Adelaide, South Australia. It is around 15 km northeast of the city centre. It is located in the City of Tea Tree Gully.

Facilities and amenities on the suburb include Ardtornish Primary School, founded in 1882, and the Steventon Post Office that opened around January 1859, to be renamed Tea Tree Gully in 1872, and Teatree Gully in 1925. Tea Tree Gully changed again in 1966 and finally became St Agnes in 1969.

== Ardtornish Primary School ==
Ardtornish Primary School is a state government R-6 coeducational school with an enrolment of about 500 students (481 - 2023). The original school was built in 1842 on the Lower North East Road in Hope Valley, and named after Ardtornish Castle in Scotland. This school was closed in 1875 when the land on which it stood was sold off by the owners.

In 1881 a new school was opened on Grand Junction Road, Hope Valley, several miles from the site of the previous school. It was again called Ardtornish Primary School.

In 1915 the name of the school was changed to Hope Valley School.

In 1980 the school moved to its current site in St Agnes. At this point the school reverted to its original name.

An extensive history can be found on the school's website along with a slightly shorter version "for younger readers".

== Industry ==
In 1970 the Municipal Tramways Trust opened a bus depot on the corner of Tolley and North East roads. In 1980 it was expanded by the State Transport Authority. It was expanded in 1989 in preparation for the O-Bahn Busway being extended. Today it is operated by Torrens Transit.
