= Ridgehaven, South Australia =

Ridgehaven
- Suburb
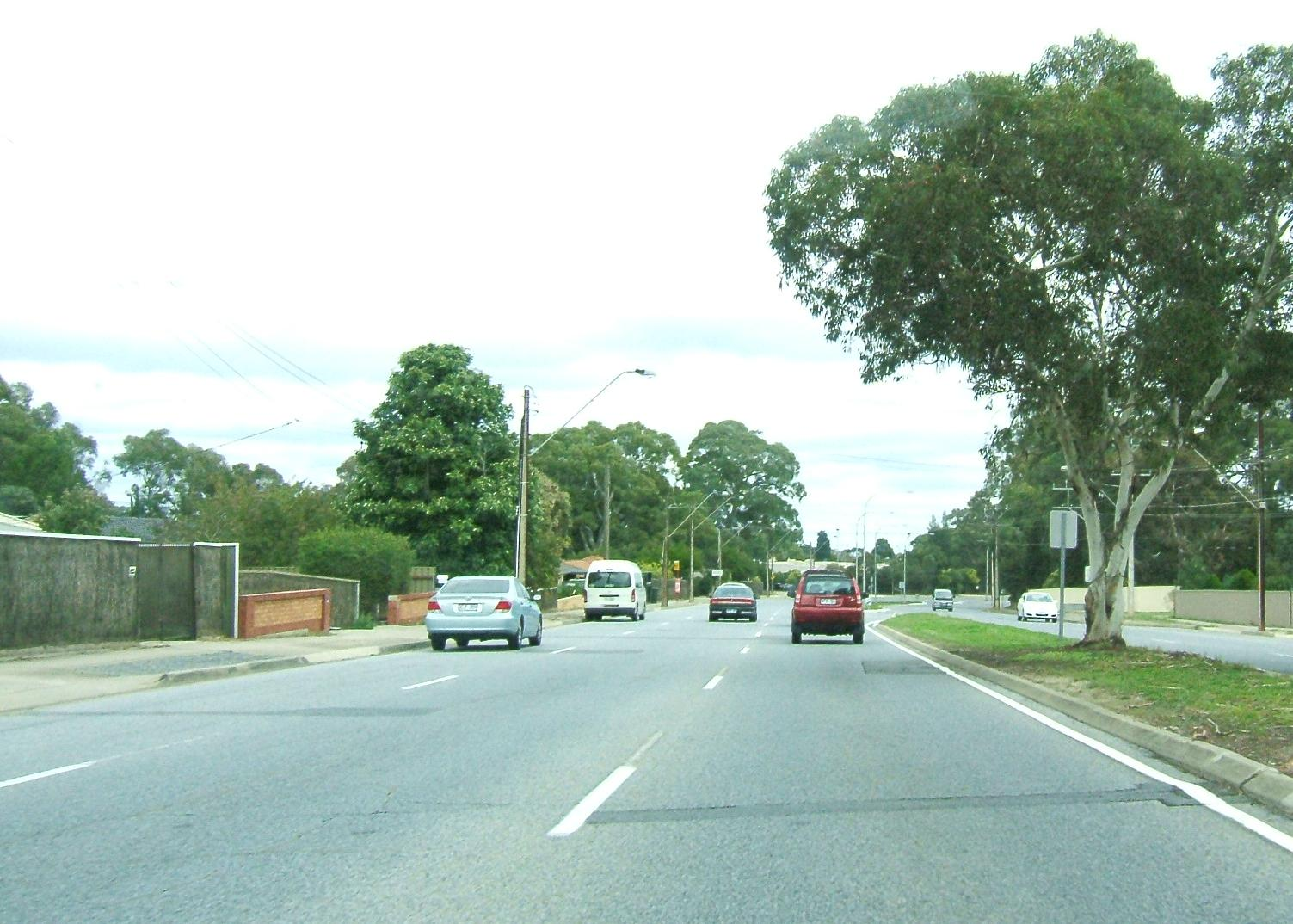
- North East Road

- Country: Australia
- State: South Australia
- City: Adelaide
- LGA: City of Tea Tree Gully

Government
  - State electorate: Newland
  - Federal division: Makin

Population
  - Total: 4,304 (SAL 2021)
- Postcode: 5097

Ridgehaven is a suburb of Adelaide, South Australia in the City of Tea Tree Gully.

== Geography ==
Ridgehaven is located in the North Eastern suburbs and is approximately 15 km from the Adelaide CBD. The largely residential suburb is bordered by North East Road to the south, Golden Grove Road to the west, Hancock Road to the east, and Milne Road to the north.

== History ==
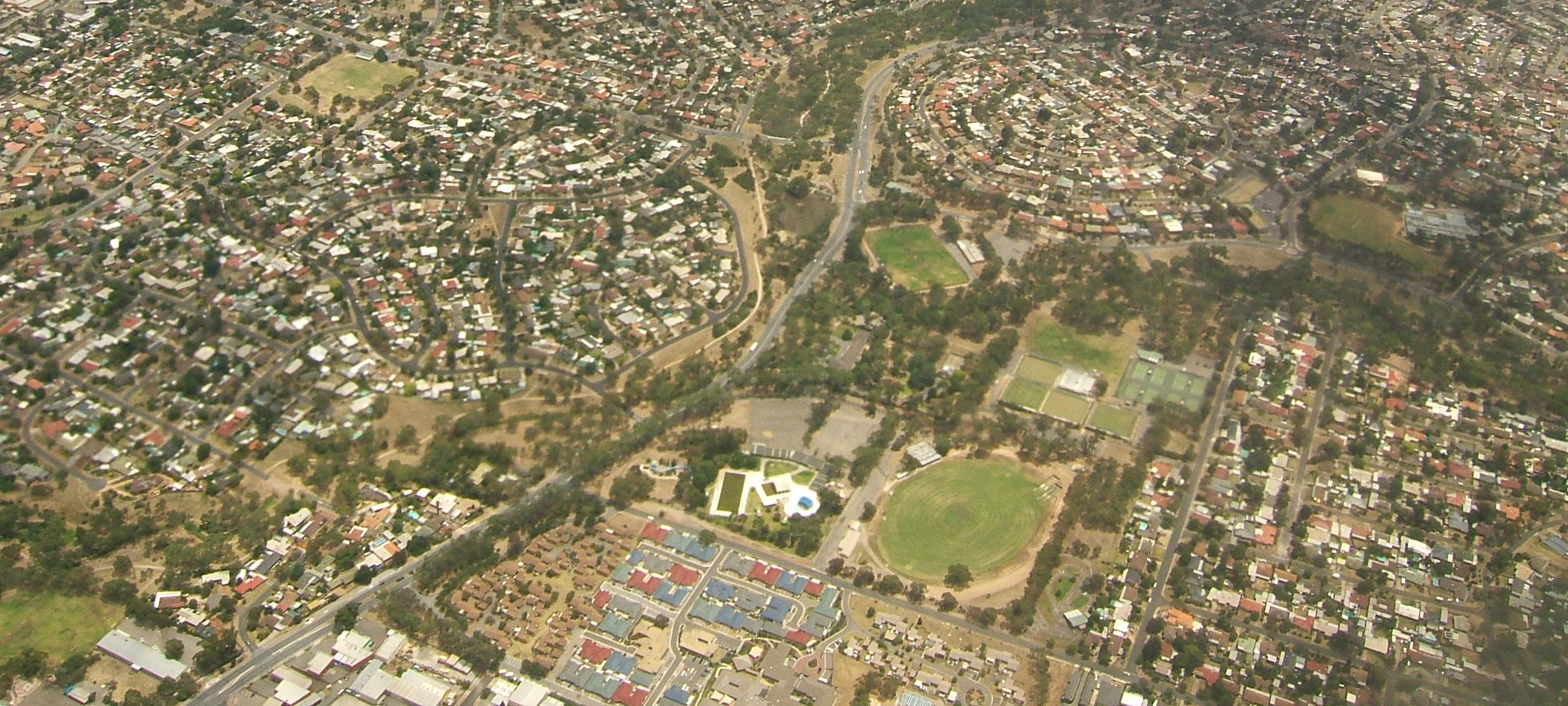
Aerial image of the northwestern part of Ridgehaven, looking northwest. Grenfell Road is the east–west road that is sloping downwards in the picture, and the north–south road that is visible is Golden Grove Road. Milne Road is indicated by the red arrow. Ridgehaven is the area to the west of Golden Grove Way and south of Milne Road, the half of the image in the bottom right. The blue and red roofed complex is the Masonic Village, and the green ovals to the north are part of Modbury Sports Reserve. Redwood Park is to the north of Milne Road, and Modbury Heights is to the left.

Development of Ridgehaven dates from the 1950s. Most housing in the suburb was constructed during the 1960s. Today Ridgehaven is a well established, largely residential suburb, with a stable population. Relatively low numbers of new dwellings have been constructed between 1996 and 2001.

== Schools ==
Ridgehaven contains one school, Ridgehaven Primary School, on Milne Road.
