= Fairview Park, South Australia =

Fairview Park
- Suburb
- Country: Australia
- State: South Australia
- City: Adelaide
- LGA: City of Tea Tree Gully

Population
  - Total: 3,792 (SAL 2021)
- Postcode: 5126

Fairview Park is a north-eastern suburb of Adelaide, South Australia within the City of Tea Tree Gully. It is at the base of the Adelaide Hills.

== Attractions ==
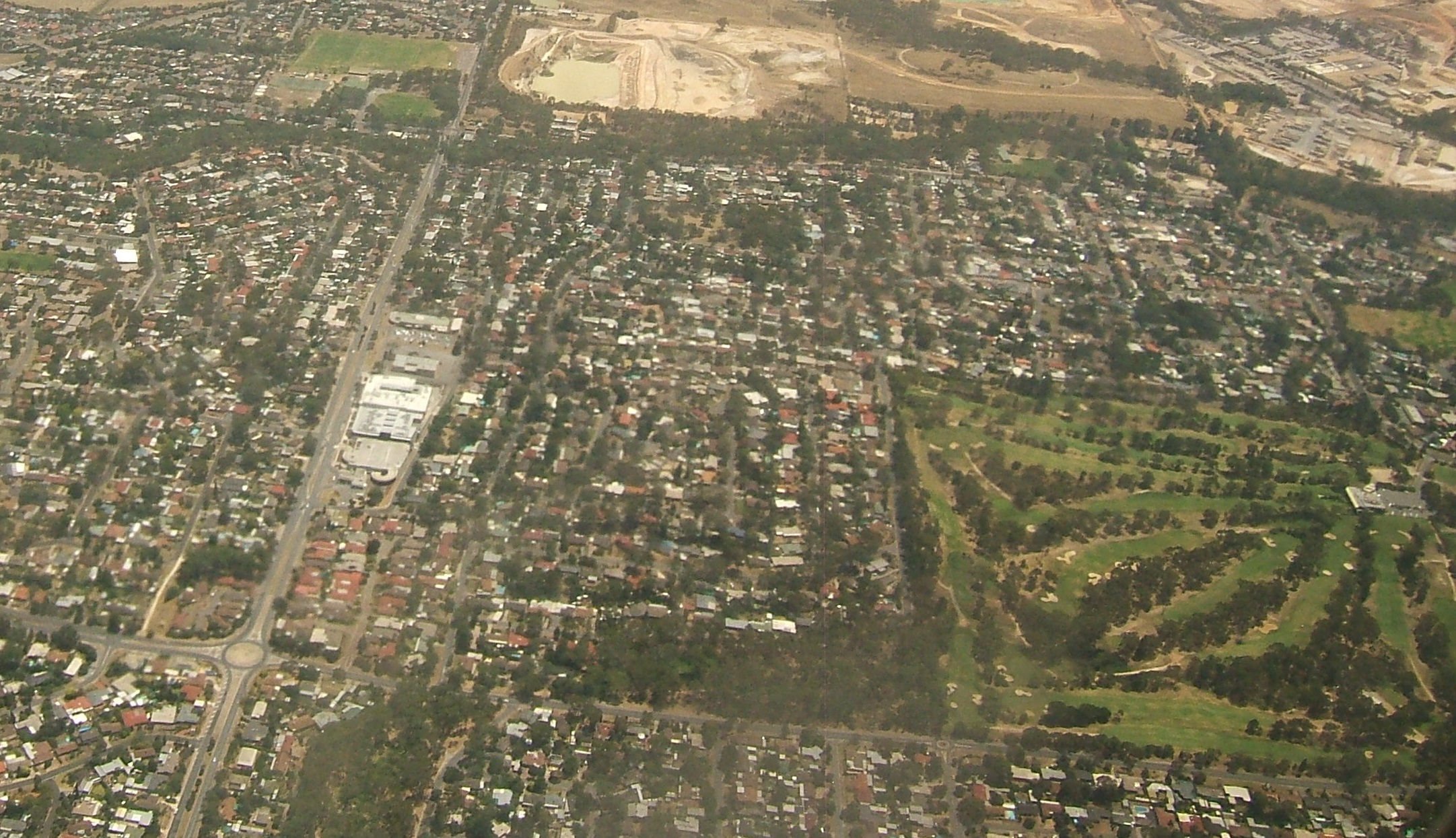
Aerial image of Fairview Park, looking north. Hancock Road is the north–south road visible on the left-hand side of the image, and Grenfell Road is the east–west road. They intersect at the roundabout in the bottom-right hand corner. Fairview Park is the area northeast of the roundabout. The northern boundary of the suburb is the quarry at the top of the picture. Tea Tree Gully Golf Course in the green region to the right. The white patch on Hancock Road is a shopping centre.

The suburb contains a large golf course on its southern boundary.

There are also commercial interests in the suburb, including a hotel, supermarket and range of businesses along Hancock Road.

== Transport ==
The following bus routes in Adelaide travel to Fairview Park through the O-Bahn Busway: 541, 541G, 542 and the 542X.
