= Storm Boy =

Storm Boy may refer to:

- Storm Boy (novel), a 1966 children's book by Colin Thiele
  - Storm Boy (1976 film), a 1976 film based on the book
  - Storm Boy (play), a play based on the book, staged in 2013 and 2015 by Sydney and Barking Gecko Theatre Companies
  - Storm Boy: The Game, children's video game based on the book, released in 2018
  - Storm Boy (2019 film), a 2019 film based on the book
- Storm Boy (album), a 2018 children's book by Xavier Rudd
