= Torrens Linear Park =

Park in South Australia, Australia

Coordinates: 34.86°S 138.72°E

- River Torrens Linear Park
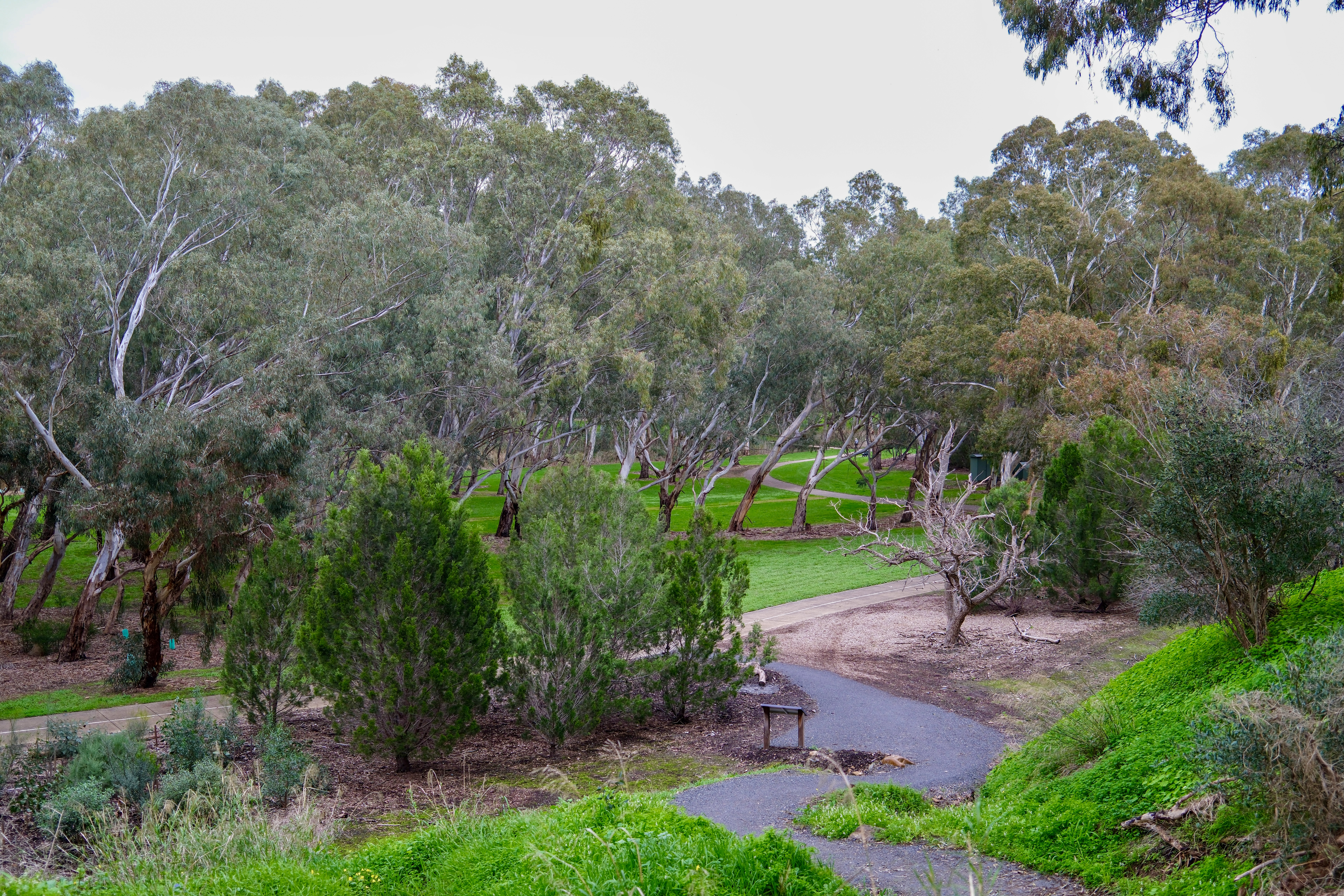
- Linear Park at Athelstone in 2026

- Location within Greater Adelaide
- Type: Linear park
- Location: Adelaide, South Australia, Australia
- Established: 1982
- Water: River Torrens

The Torrens Linear Park is a linear park that runs along the River Torrens in South Australia, spanning from the edge of Adelaide Hills in Athelstone to the coast in West Beach and Henley Beach South. Upon completion in 1997, it was the first linear park of its kind in Australia, and also the largest hills-to-coast park. The construction of the park began as a flood mitigation scheme along the River Torrens running westward from the Adelaide Hills, through the Adelaide metropolitan area, to the sea. Cyclists and walkers can use a trail that runs the 30 km (19 mi) length of the park, from Gorge Road, in Athelstone in the north-east, through the Northern Parklands of the City of Adelaide, to the river mouth at Henley Beach South in the west. In the Parklands section, the river runs past many notable landmarks including the Adelaide Zoo, the Adelaide Botanic Gardens, the Festival Theatre and Elder Park.

There are shared-use pedestrian and cycling paths along both sides of the river for most of the length of the park, and along one side of the O-Bahn Busway.

== History ==
The valley of the River Torrens, particularly its lower reaches, had become badly polluted following European settlement in 1836. Land clearance led to increased runoff and erosion, with major flood events occurring in 1917 and 1933. An artificial channel, Breakout Creek, was completed in 1937, diverting floodwaters directly to the sea, and opening up areas of the western suburbs to housing development, particularly after World War II. Rapid expansion of housing in the eastern suburbs also took place at this time. Awareness of the risk of increased runoff leading to further flooding events led to various proposals for flood mitigation in the 1950s and 1960s, including converting the river to a concrete-lined channel, or an underground storm-water pipe below a major highway.

The Torrens Linear Park concept, using the river valley for combined use as urban open space with flood mitigation, was initially set out in the River Torrens Study (1979) and the River Torrens Flood Mitigation Study (1980). The River Torrens Linear Park and Flood Mitigation Scheme was approved by State Parliament in 1981. A further elaboration, the River Torrens Linear Park Study, included a transport option for a section of the park east of the CBD, which became the O-Bahn guided busway.

The scheme required the cooperation of the state government, responsible for land acquisition and flood mitigation works, and the then 12 (now 8) metropolitan councils bordering the river, responsible for landscaping and construction of cycling/walking trails. Construction works began in January 1982, and were completed in September 1997.

The Linear Park became protected against further development with the passing of the River Torrens Linear Park Act on 21 June 2006.

Between 2007 and 2008 a new aqueduct, an underground water pipe from Gorge Weir to the Hope Valley Reservoir, was constructed along an eastern section of the Linear Park, while the land formerly occupied by the open channel of the old Highbury Aqueduct was added to the Linear Park in 2012.
