= 5022 =

5022 may refer to:

- The year in the 6th millennium

postal codes

- 5022 Henley Beach
- 5022 Henley Beach South
- 5022 Tennyson

air flights

- Spanair Flight 5022
