= Mr Percival =

Trained pelican

- Mr Percival
- Species: Australian pelican
- Sex: Male
- Hatched: 1976; Marineland aquarium, West Beach, South Australia
- Died: 2 September 2009 (aged 32–33); Chicken House, Adelaide, South Australia
- Occupation: Actor
- Years active: 1976
- Mate: Alto (d. 2009)

Mr Percival (1976 – 2 September 2009) was an Australian pelican, noted for his appearance in the 1976 Australian film Storm Boy. He was one of three trained pelicans used in the film, based on the 1964 novel of the same name. He lived at the Marineland aquarium at West Beach until it closed in 1988, then at the Adelaide Zoo. Mr Percival, whose name at the zoo was Gringo, fathered seven chicks with partner Alto, the last in 2007. He died on 2 September 2009.

== See also ==
- List of animal actors
- List of individual birds
