= Jacqui Gordon =

Australian actress

- Born: 1962 (age 63–64); Melbourne, Australia
- Other names: Jacqui Lockhead, Jacky Lockhead
- Occupation: Actress
- Known for: Prisoner
- Family: Vic Gordon (stepfather)

Jacqui Gordon (born 1962) credited also Jacqui Lockhead, is an Australian actress. She appeared in television dramas, including Prisoner as Susie Driscoll, Cop Shop, Homicide, Matlock Police, Division 4, The Sullivans, The Flying Doctors and Neighbours as Kerry O'Donnell.

She toured the United Kingdom in a stage play version of Prisoner in 1990.

== Selected filmography ==
=== Film ===
| Year | Title | Role | Type |
|---|---|---|---|
| 1979 | Snapshot | Becky | Feature film |
| 1979 | Thirst | Leah | Feature film |

=== Television ===
| Year | Title | Role | Type |
|---|---|---|---|
| 1972 | Homicide | Guest role: Young Barbara Carlisle | TV series, 1 episode |
| 1972–1975 | Division 4 | Guest roles: Margaret Lee/Tracie Walker/Angie Hudson | TV series, 3 episodes |
| 1972; 1973 | Matlock Police | Guest role: Sally Patterson | TV series, 1 episode |
| 1973 | Matlock Police | Guest role: Becky Best | TV series, 1 episode |
| 1974 | Marion | Regular role: Cathy (credited as Jacqui Lockhead') | ABC TV miniseries, 4 episodes |
| 1975 | Quality of Mercy | Lead role: Sally | ABC TV series, 1 episode "Sally Go Round The Moon" |
| 1976 | The Sullivans | Recurring role: Margery Fulton | TV series, 4 episodes |
| 1978–1980 | Cop Shop | Guest roles: Linette/Kate Shaw/Karen Foley | TV series, 4 episodes |
| 1980 | Dead Man's Float (aka Smuggler’s Cove) | Sue | TV film |
| 1980 | Young Ramsay | Guest role: Linda Burns | TV series, 1 episode |
| 1981 | Bellamy | Guest role: Carol | TV series, 1 episode "My Favourite Policeman" |
| 1982 | Come Midnight Monday | Regular role: Jenny "Bugsy" Hoolihan | ABC TV miniseries, 6 episodes |
| 1982 | Prisoner | Recurring role: Susie Driscoll | TV series, 43 episodes |
| 1984 | Carson's Law | Guest role: Ellen Stokes | TV series, 2 episodes |
| 1985 | The Flying Doctors | Recurring role: Rhonda Lovejoy | TV series, 3 episodes |
| 1985 | The Fast Lane | Guest role: Megan | TV series, 1 episode |
| 1985 | Neighbours | Guest role: Kerry O'Donnell | TV series, 1 episode |
| 1989 | The Power, the Passion | Recurring role: Susan Walsh | TV series |
| 1989 | Australia's Most Wanted | Guest role | TV series, 1 episode |
