= Paradise Interchange =

Bus station in Adelaide, Australia

Coordinates: 34.86853°S 138.66191°E

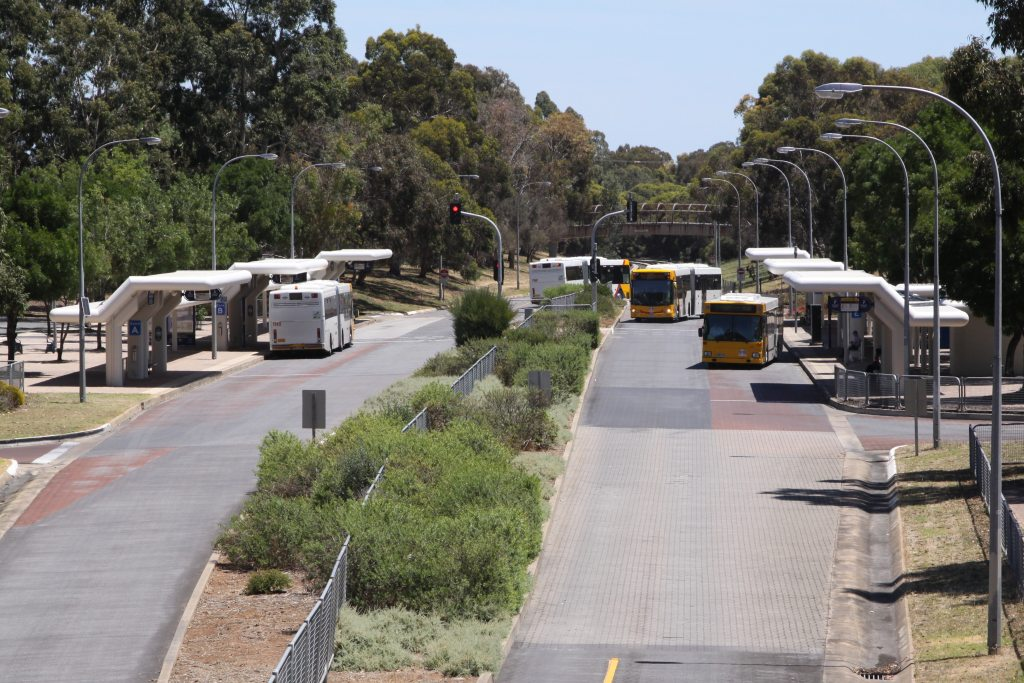
- Looking over Paradise Interchange towards the Adelaide city centre

General information
- Location: Gameau Road, Paradise, South Australia
- Owner: Adelaide Metro
- Operator: Adelaide Metro
- Bus routes: C1, C2, G40, H30, H30C, J1, J1A, J2, M44, 178, 178X, 500, 501, 502, 503, 506, 507, 530, 540, 541, 541G, 548, 556, 557, 559, 567, 578
- Bus stands: 8
- Bus operators: Torrens Transit

Construction
- Parking: 625 bays
- Accessible: Yes

Other information
- Station code: 12099 (Zone A); 12113 (Zone B); 12129 (Zone C); 12126 (Zone D); 12106 (Zone E); 12097 (Zone F); 18794 (Zone G); 12096 (Zone I)

History
- Opened: 9 March 1986

Services
Preceding station	Adelaide Metro	Following station
Klemzig Interchange Terminus	O-Bahn Busway	Tea Tree Plaza Interchange Terminus
Location

Paradise Interchange is a bus interchange operated by Adelaide Metro in Paradise, South Australia as part of the O-Bahn Busway.

== History ==
Paradise Interchange was built as the terminating station of Stage 1 of the O-Bahn Busway. It was officially opened on 2 March 1986 by Premier John Bannon, with services commencing on 9 March. The busway was extended to Tea Tree Plaza Interchange on 20 August 1989.

It is located mid-way along the O-Bahn Busway, between Klemzig Interchange and Tea Tree Plaza Interchange, six kilometres (3.7 mi) from the Adelaide city centre. Paradise Interchange has 625 car parking spaces, and is located on the south side of Darley Road, with access roads permitting buses to transfer between local roads and the busway.

Paradise Interchange is served by 34 routes.
