= Marineland of South Australia =

Former public aquarium and wildlife park in West Beach, South Australia

Marineland of South Australia was a public aquarium and wildlife park in West Beach, South Australia that opened in 1969 and closed permanently in 1988.

== Exhibits ==
Exhibits included local species such as the Australian pelican, Little penguin, Australian sea lion, Long-nosed fur seal, Southern rock lobster, sea urchins, leatherjackets and other fishes. In 1974, a loggerhead turtle that had been caught in a crayfish pot off Kangaroo Island was put on exhibit. In 1987, a sea lion pup, believed to have been orphaned was taken into care at Marineland. Bottlenose dolphins were trained to perform tricks, including one called Nipper, who had been caught in the wild by fishermen at Outer Harbor then taught to leap through a flaming hoop. Patrons were also able to "dine with dolphins" while seated in a restaurant with windows into the dolphin enclosure.

Helicopter joyflights on the Seven Network helicopter could also be taken from Marineland for a fee.

== Management ==
In 1974, the manager of Marineland was Terry Woon.

== Fate of captive dolphins ==
The keeping of dolphins in captivity became a controversial issue in the final years of the centre and after its closure. The fate of six captive dolphins was publicly debated and their health was investigated by veterinarians. One of the dolphins was pregnant. People were concerned that the dolphins might not survive relocation as their health had declined, while others opposed euthanasia. Groups taking positions on the issue included Wildwatch, who sought to experiment with retraining the dolphins, Friends of the Dolphins who believed the dolphins would perish if returned to the sea and wanted them to remain in a land-based "dolphinarium" and the South Coast Peace and Environment Group.

Wildwatch proposed a new home for dolphins and other species at Granite Island that could support the rehabilitation of stranded or sick marine species as well as reconditioning the captive dolphins for potential release to the wild. American dolphin trainer Ric O'Barry visited South Australia to consult on the subject, and stated that the facilities for captive dolphins that he had seen in Australia were "the worst in the world". He said that at least the Chinese had the excuse that they lacked the wealth to improve the animals' living conditions. Some of the dolphins were ultimately transported to an aquarium in Queensland.
