= O-Bahn Busway =

Guided busway in Adelaide, South Australia

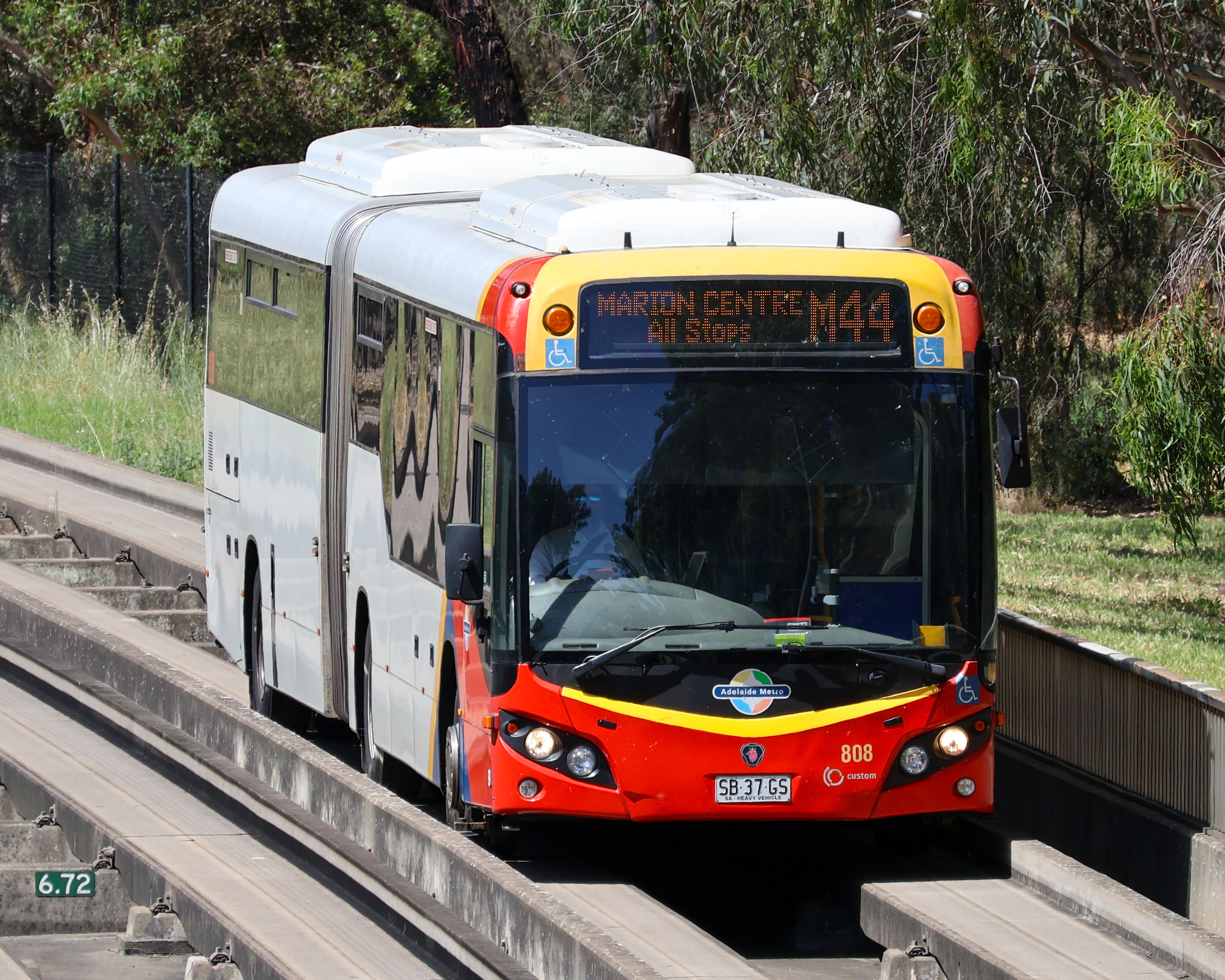
- A Custom Coaches CB80 bodied Scania K360UA on the O-Bahn Busway approaching Paradise Interchange

Overview
- System: Adelaide Metro
- Operator: Torrens Transit
- Status: Operational
- Began service: 9 March 1986 (stage 1); 20 August 1989 (stage 2); 10 December 2017 (City Access tunnel)
- Former operators: Light-City Buses; TransAdelaide; State Transport Authority

Route
- Route type: Guided busway / Bus rapid transit
- Start: Grenfell Street
- End: Tea Tree Plaza Interchange
- Length: 12 kilometres (7 mi)
- Stations: 3

Service
- Journey time: 20 minutes
- Ridership: 31,000 per day (2015)
Route map
- All interchanges are entry and exit points for bus services

The O-Bahn Busway is a guided busway that is part of the bus rapid transit system servicing the northeastern suburbs of Adelaide, South Australia. The original O-Bahn system is the one in the German city of Essen, and it was conceived by Daimler-Benz to enable buses to avoid traffic congestion by sharing tram tunnels.

Adelaide's O-Bahn was introduced in 1986 to service the city's rapidly expanding north-eastern suburbs, replacing an earlier plan for a tramway extension. The O-Bahn provides specially built track, combining elements of both bus and rail systems. The track is 12 kilometres (7 mi) long and includes three interchanges at Klemzig, Paradise and Tea Tree Plaza. Interchanges allow buses to enter and exit the busway and to continue on suburban routes, avoiding the need for passengers to transfer to another bus to continue their journey. Buses can travel at a maximum speed of 100 km/h (60 mph), but have been restricted to a 90 km/h (55 mph) speed limit since 2016. As of 2015, the busway carried approximately 31,000 people per weekday. An additional section including a 670-metre (2,200 ft) tunnel opened in 2017 at the city end to reduce the number of congested intersections buses must traverse to enter the Adelaide city centre.

The development of the O-Bahn busway led to the development of the Torrens Linear Park from a run-down urban drain into an attractive public open space. It has also triggered urban development around the north-eastern terminus at Modbury.

== Track ==
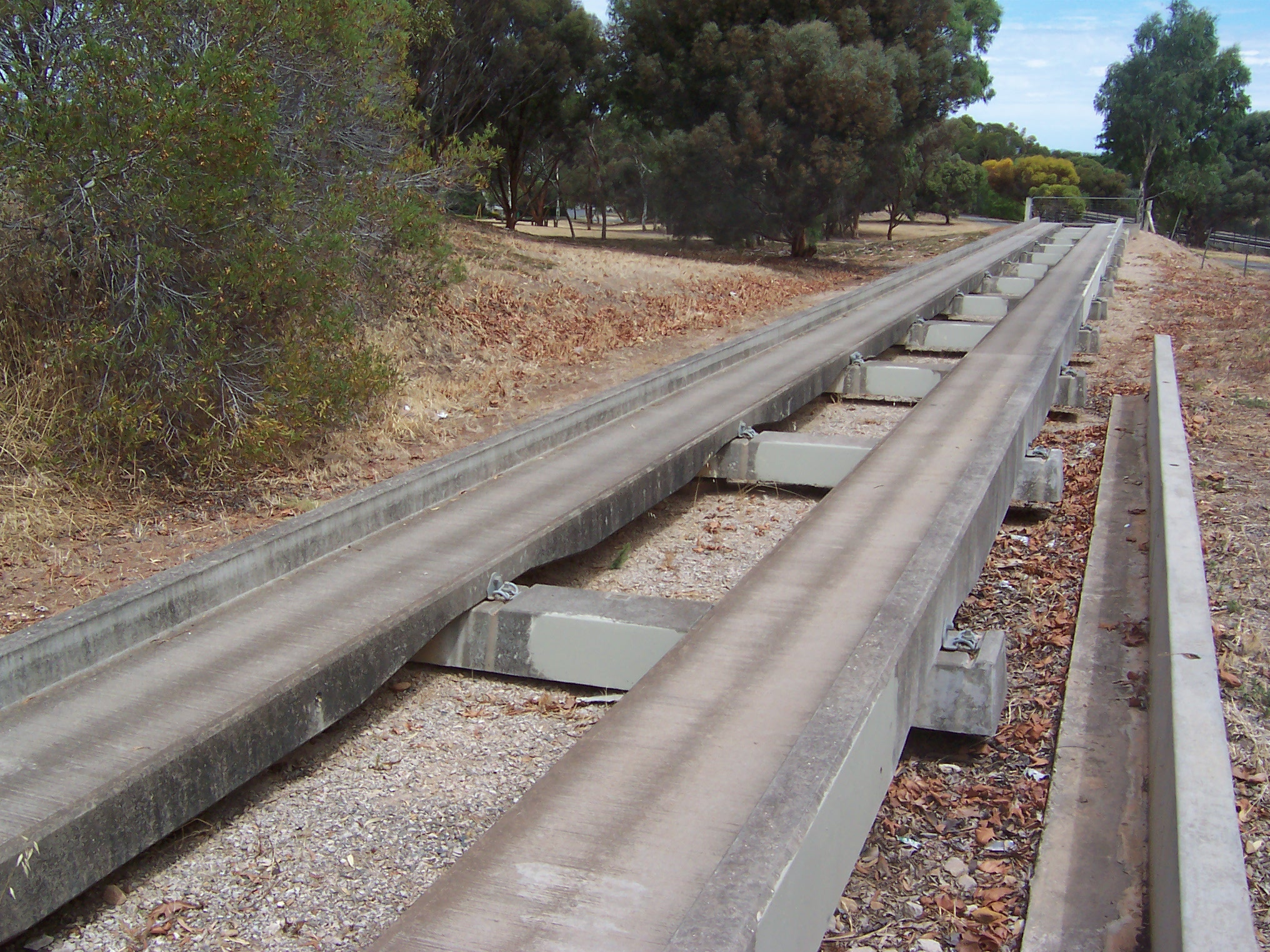
A section of track used for testing O-Bahn buses

The O-Bahn track is made of concrete; it is elevated from the ground because of the poor quality of alluvial soils along the River Torrens, which frequently move due to their high level of plasticity. On top of the pylons are concrete sleepers on which the track rests. 5,600 pylons were drilled in place to support 5,600 sleepers and 4,200 prefabricated L-shaped track pieces, sited at 12-metre (39 ft) intervals. Concrete pylons were cast into the ground to ensure stability, to a depth of up to four metres (13 ft). The width of both tracks, sitting on the sleepers, is 6.2 metres (20 ft). The O-Bahn's concrete tracks were narrower and lighter than those of the initially proposed light rail development, and put less stress on the land. The concrete components were precast and then laid onto piers.

At the city end, the O-Bahn begins at East Terrace, as an extension eastwards from Grenfell Street into the parklands. The O-Bahn enters a 670-metre (2,200 ft) tunnel, completed in December 2017, which curves from east to north, emerging onto bus lanes in the middle of Hackney Road just north of the intersection with Botanic Road and North Terrace. The bus lane continues north to the River Torrens and into the original entrance of the O-Bahn on Hackney Road, opposite the East Parklands, where it enters a 60-metre (200 ft) tunnel at a speed limited to 40 km/h (25 mph), due to the tight initial corner, ensuring that the rear tyres (especially trailer tyres of articulated buses) do not 'scrub' against the track. Speed is gradually increased to 80 km/h (50 mph) for most of the trip to Klemzig Interchange. Once en route to Paradise Interchange, the speed limit was up to 100 km/h (60 mph), but has been limited to 85 km/h (55 mph) since late 2012. On some sections 115 km/h (70 mph) was achieved in tests. The average service speed including stops is about 60 km/h (35 mph). On entering interchanges the O-Bahn ends and the speed limit is 40 km/h (25 mph). In the interchange area, the speed limit is 20 km/h (10 mph). The O-Bahn is officially considered a road, due to a court ruling in the early years of the system's operation. This ruling permits the South Australia Police to install speed cameras and fine speeding drivers.

Cars entering the O-Bahn are deterred by a large number of signs at entrance points and a sump buster device that rips out a car's sump (oil pan) if it gets onto the track. An average of four cars per year enter the O-Bahn and must be removed by crane.

== Buses ==
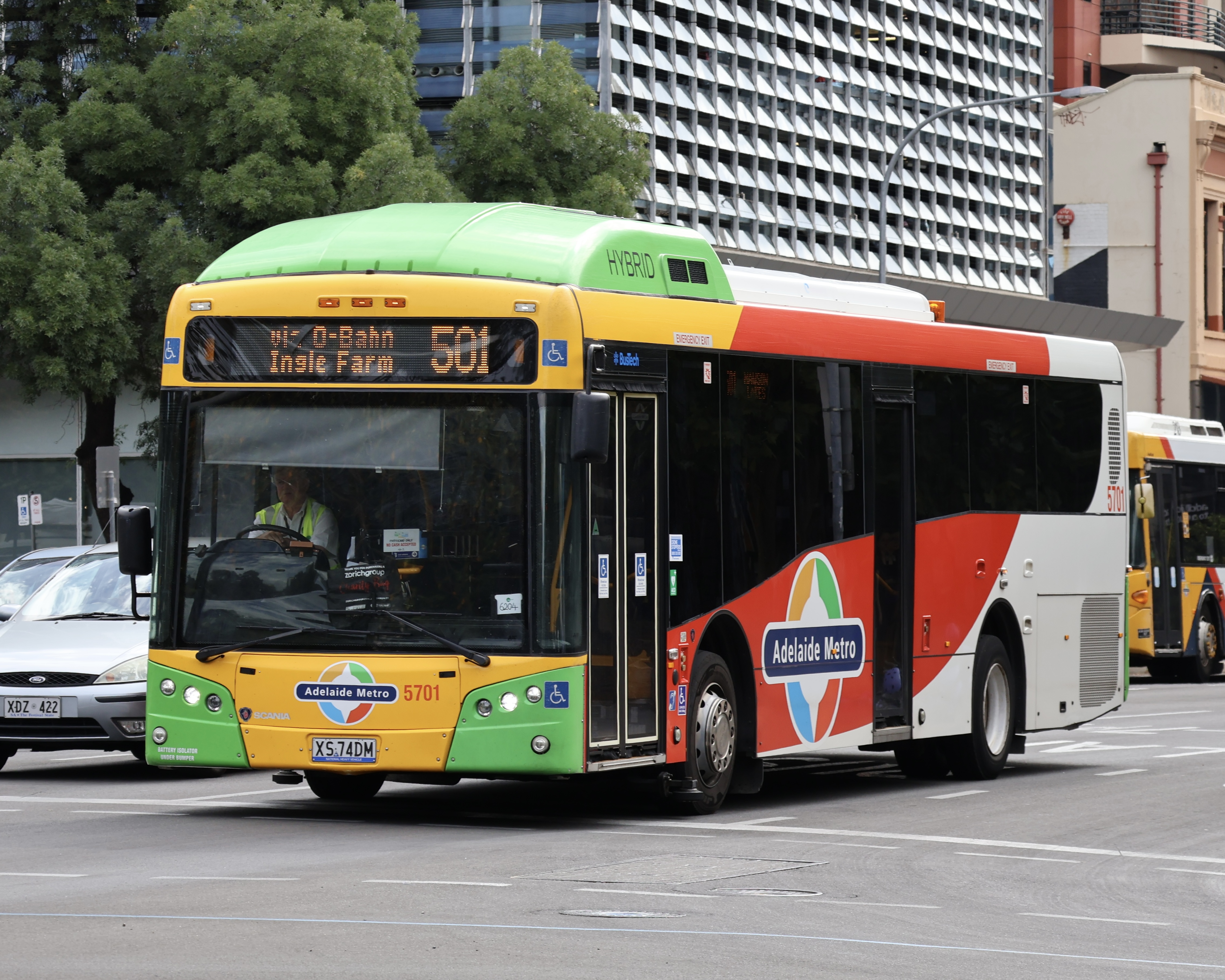
Scania K320HB hybrid bus in the CBD, with the guide wheels visible beside the front wheels

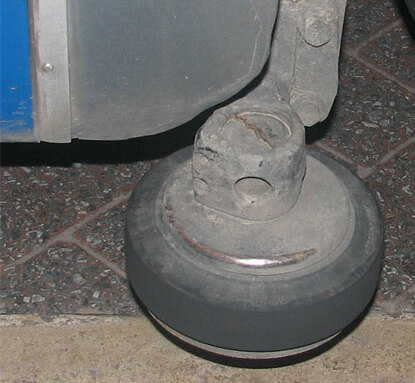
Guide-wheel

The first buses to enter service on the O-Bahn were 41 rigid and 51 articulated Mercedes-Benz O305s. These were modified for O-Bahn use by Mitsubishi Motors' Clovelly Park plant before being bodied by Pressed Metal Corporation South Australia. The cost was included in the original $98 million budget. Modified MAN SG280s and SL202s were later purchased.

With the Mercedes-Benz O305s approaching their 25-year age limit, tenders were called in 2007 for replacements. The new buses were Scania K230UB rigid and Scania K320UA articulated buses bodied by Custom Coaches. As of May 2021, these, along with rigid Scania K280UB/K320UB buses, articulated Scania K360UA buses, one diesel/electric hybrid Scania K320UB, and one Mercedes-Benz O405NH make up the fleet.

In the case of breakdowns, a specially designed vehicle nicknamed 'Dumbo' is used to tow buses from the O-Bahn. In the early stages of design it was intended that all buses would have towing ability; however, this was soundly rejected by the drivers' union and 'Dumbo' was purchased. If a tyre blows during a trip the guide-wheel prevents the bus from erratic movement, and a smaller aluminium inner tyre allows the bus to be driven to the nearest station at 40 km/h (25 mph).

The guide-wheel, which protrudes just ahead of the front wheels, is the most important part of the bus when travelling on the O-Bahn. It is connected directly to the steering mechanism, and steers the bus by running along the raised edge of the track. While it is not strictly necessary for drivers to hold the steering wheel when travelling on the O-Bahn because of the guide-wheel, safety procedures require the driver to be alert to their circumstances at all times. A rumble strip before stations is a reminder that they need to resume control. The guide-wheel is the most delicate part of the system and is designed to snap off upon sharp impact; before the O-Bahn was in place, a number of buses were fitted with guide-wheels for their ordinary routes to test their durability. Drivers were forced to be more cautious on their normal trips after numerous guide-wheel-to-kerb impacts.

Since June 2018, services are operated by Torrens Transit under contract to Adelaide Metro. As of 2015, the busway carries approximately 31,000 people per weekday.

== Interchanges ==
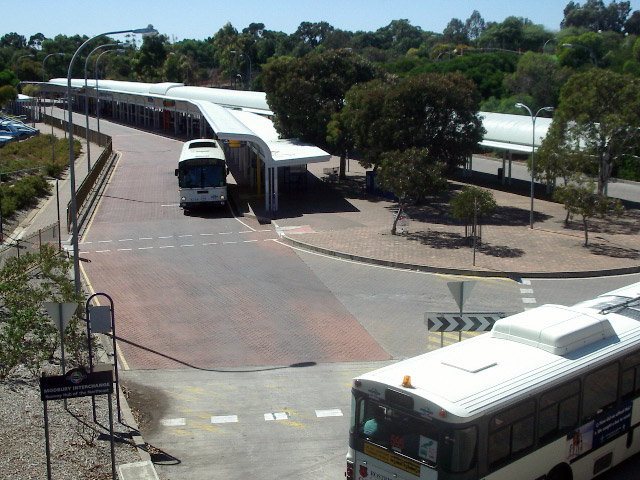
Tea Tree Plaza Interchange

Klemzig Interchange is the first station, 3 kilometres (2 mi) from the city centre in the suburb of Klemzig. It was built as a connector to the city loop 'Circle Line' bus service, which followed the Adelaide outer ring route. Many bus services bypass Klemzig and the station has limited capacity. It contains a park & ride carpark with 450 spaces.

Paradise Interchange is the second station, 6 kilometres (4 mi) from the city centre, in the suburb of Paradise. The terminus before the completion of Stage 2, it is now served by buses from suburban streets, and has a total of 875 car parking spaces in two areas.

Tea Tree Plaza Interchange is the terminus, 12 kilometres (7 mi) from the city centre, in Modbury. Adjacent to the Westfield Tea Tree Plaza, it is the largest O-Bahn station. Bus services from this interchange connect to areas as far away as Elizabeth and service the Golden Grove area. It has 700 car parking spaces, after a multiple level carpark was built during a redevelopment in 2013.

== Route ==
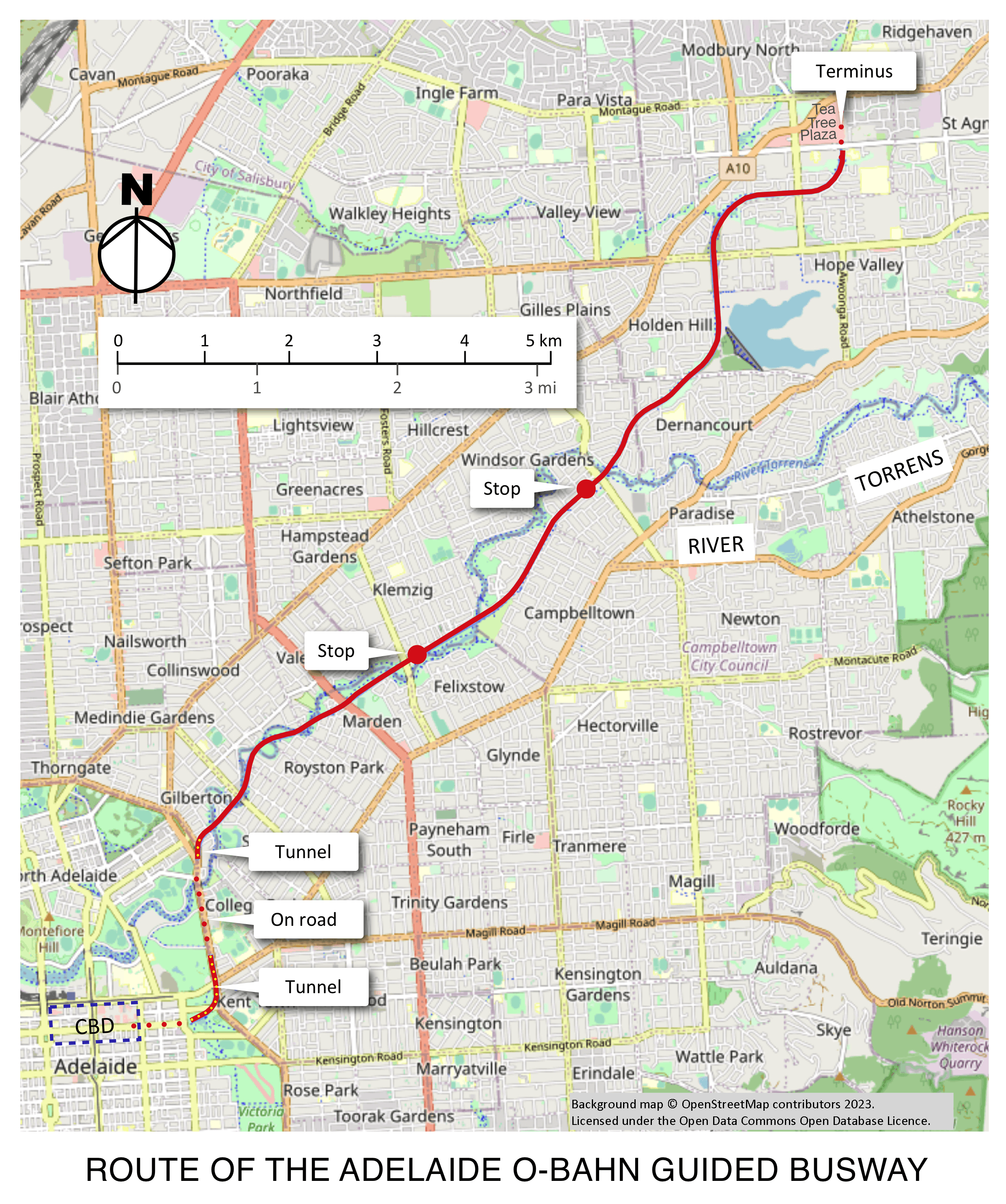

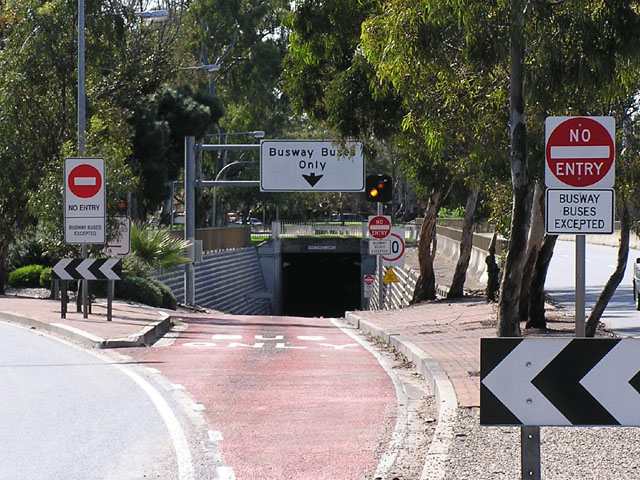
O-Bahn's southern entrance on Hackney Road

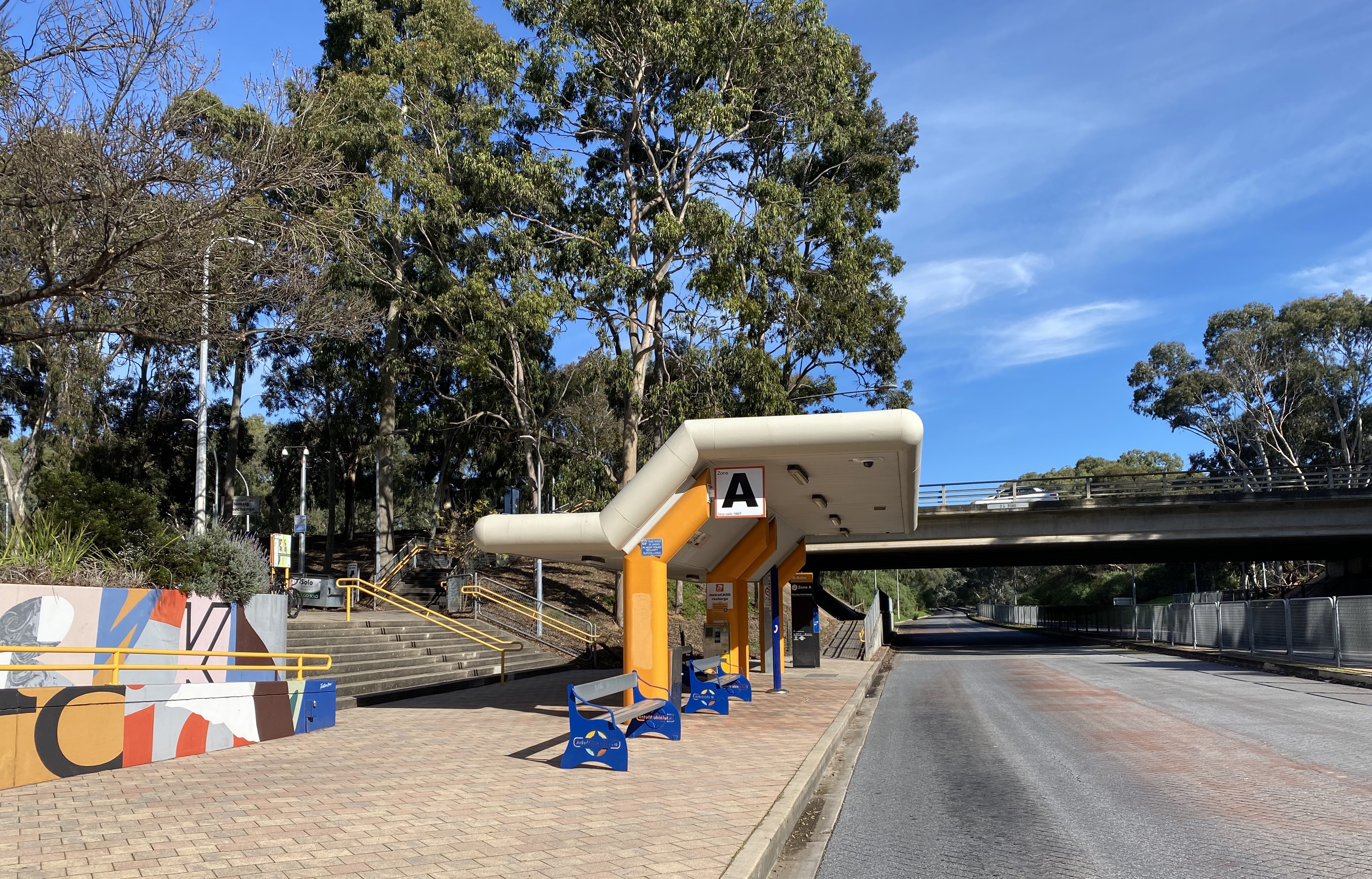
Klemzig Interchange, one of the O-Bahn's two intermediary interchanges

Outbound O-Bahn bus routes travel through the Adelaide city centre along Grenfell Street, and enter the O-Bahn via the 670-metre (2,200 ft) tunnel (opened on 10 December 2017) through the Adelaide Park Lands in Rymill Park. They then exit the tunnel on Hackney Road, north of the intersection with Dequetteville Terrace, and then proceed northwards along the road in designated bus lanes. Along this stretch the Adelaide Botanic Garden is on the left, followed by Botanic Park. Hackney Road—along with the designated O-Bahn bus lanes—crosses a bridge over the River Torrens, with the bus lanes veering easterly, to the northbound entrance of the guided O-Bahn busway. The busway dips below the surface road (Park Road) to join the inbound (southbound) track, both heading northeast.

The busway follows roughly the Torrens River valley, but with smoother curves. This means that it crosses the river quite often, with either a park or a few houses on a point surrounded by the river and busway. This occurs a total of eight times before the busway reaches Klemzig Interchange on the north side of the river. The busway crosses the river again soon after Klemzig and passes Lochiel Park and part of the suburbs of Campbelltown and Paradise to its north between the busway and the river before reaching Paradise Interchange.

After Paradise Interchange, the busway passes under Darley Road, then over the Torrens for the last time. The terrain becomes steeper as the busway proceeds up along the outflow creek and past the northwestern side of the Hope Valley Reservoir. It proceeds north under Grand Junction Road, then swings east and north again to enter the eastern side of the Westfield Tea Tree Plaza shopping centre precinct, where the guided busway ends at Tea Tree Plaza Interchange. Most buses continue on normal roads to service suburbs further afield.

LGA	Location	km	mi	Name	Destinations	Notes
Walkerville	Gilberton	0	0.0		Hackney Road to Adelaide city centre	All routes on the busway continue from here to the city centre
Port Adelaide Enfield	Klemzig	3	1.9	Klemzig Interchange	528 to Northgate	
Campbelltown	Paradise	6	3.7	Paradise Interchange	500 to Elizabeth Interchange; 501 to Mawson Lakes; 502 to Salisbury Interchange; 503, 506, 507, 556, 557, 559 to Tea Tree Plaza Interchange	
Tea Tree Gully	Modbury	12	7.5	Tea Tree Plaza Interchange	541, 542X to Fairview Park; 543X to Surrey Downs; 544X, 545X, 548 to Golden Grove; 546 to Para Hills	

All listed routes connect Adelaide City Centre to the named endpoint, but service different suburbs between the O-Bahn interchange and that endpoint.

== History ==
=== 1955–1980: Transportation planning and options ===
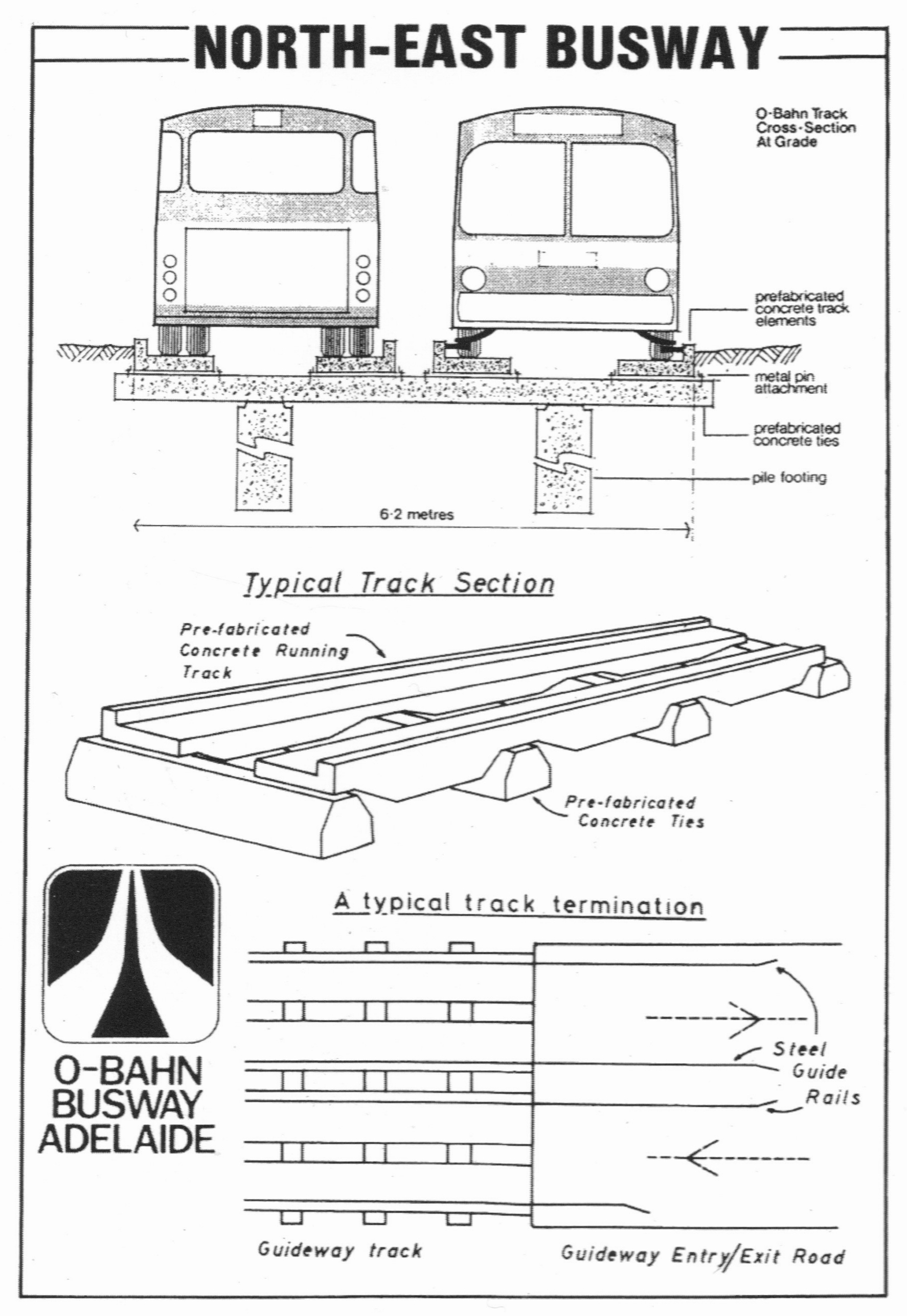
Track schematic diagram

The greater Adelaide area experienced significant growth during and after World War II. Between 1944 and 1965, the area's population doubled, and the number of private motor vehicle registrations increased 43-fold. In 1955, the state government under Premier Sir Thomas Playford established a Town Planning Committee and commissioned a coordinated plan to guide the future development of Adelaide. The resulting 300-page study, "Report on the Metropolitan Area of Adelaide 1962", laid out a 30-year development plan, including a proposed 98 kilometres (61 mi) of improved roadways. Shortly before leaving office in 1965, Playford commissioned a detailed study focusing on the recommended transportation improvements.

In 1968, the government received the Metropolitan Adelaide Transport Study (MATS) that envisaged a 156-kilometre (97 mi) network of 10 freeways crossing the metropolitan area, a rapid rail network, and an underground city loop railway. MATS drew massive public opposition, as it called for the acquisition of thousands of properties and would effectively supplant a number of suburbs that were to become the sites of interchanges. Arguments broke out in Parliament, and widespread images of gridlock in overseas freeway networks contributed to the furore. Nonetheless, in early 1969 Premier Steele Hall approved implementation of the plan in a modified format, and the government began to purchase property along the proposed corridors. In mid-1969, faced with ongoing opposition, the state abandoned plans for 2 of the 10 proposed freeways. Hall was voted out of office in 1970, and the new government under Premier Don Dunstan passed a 10-year moratorium on freeway development, effectively shelving MATS. The already-acquired corridors were retained for potential future use.

By the mid-1970s, transportation had become a problem in the north-east suburbs. The population of the Tea Tree Gully region had increased from 2,500 in 1954 to 35,000 by 1971. A corridor of land along the River Torrens from Adelaide to Modbury, originally purchased for the Modbury Freeway proposed under the MATS plan, was the subject of a new proposal in 1973 when the State Director-General of Transport suggested building a heavy rail line that would connect the suburb to the Adelaide railway system. A subsequent study, the "North East Adelaide Public Transport Review" (NEAPTR), considered heavy rail, light rail, busways, and freeways, ultimately concluding that a light rail line or busway would be most viable. The state government decided on a light rail proposal to extend the historic Glenelg tram line. The new route was to continue along King William Street beyond what was then the terminus in Victoria Square and weave through the Adelaide Park Lands to the Modbury corridor. The light rail system would connect with feeder buses at stations along the length of the corridor to transfer passengers to suburban routes. New light rail vehicles were to be bought to replace the ageing 1929 H type trams.

Public opposition to the project was broad. The Adelaide City Council objected to the plan on the basis that it would interfere with the well-designed layout of the city proper. In response, the government altered the plan to redirect the line underneath the city, at a considerable increase in cost. Residents in inner-city suburbs such as St Peters were concerned about the noise of the light rail vehicles, and protested against any disruption of the Torrens Gorge in the Modbury corridor. Test drilling commenced for the tunnel, but the entire light rail project was halted in 1980 after Premier David Tonkin appointed Michael Wilson, an opponent of the plan, as Transport Minister.

=== 1980–1989: O-Bahn solution ===
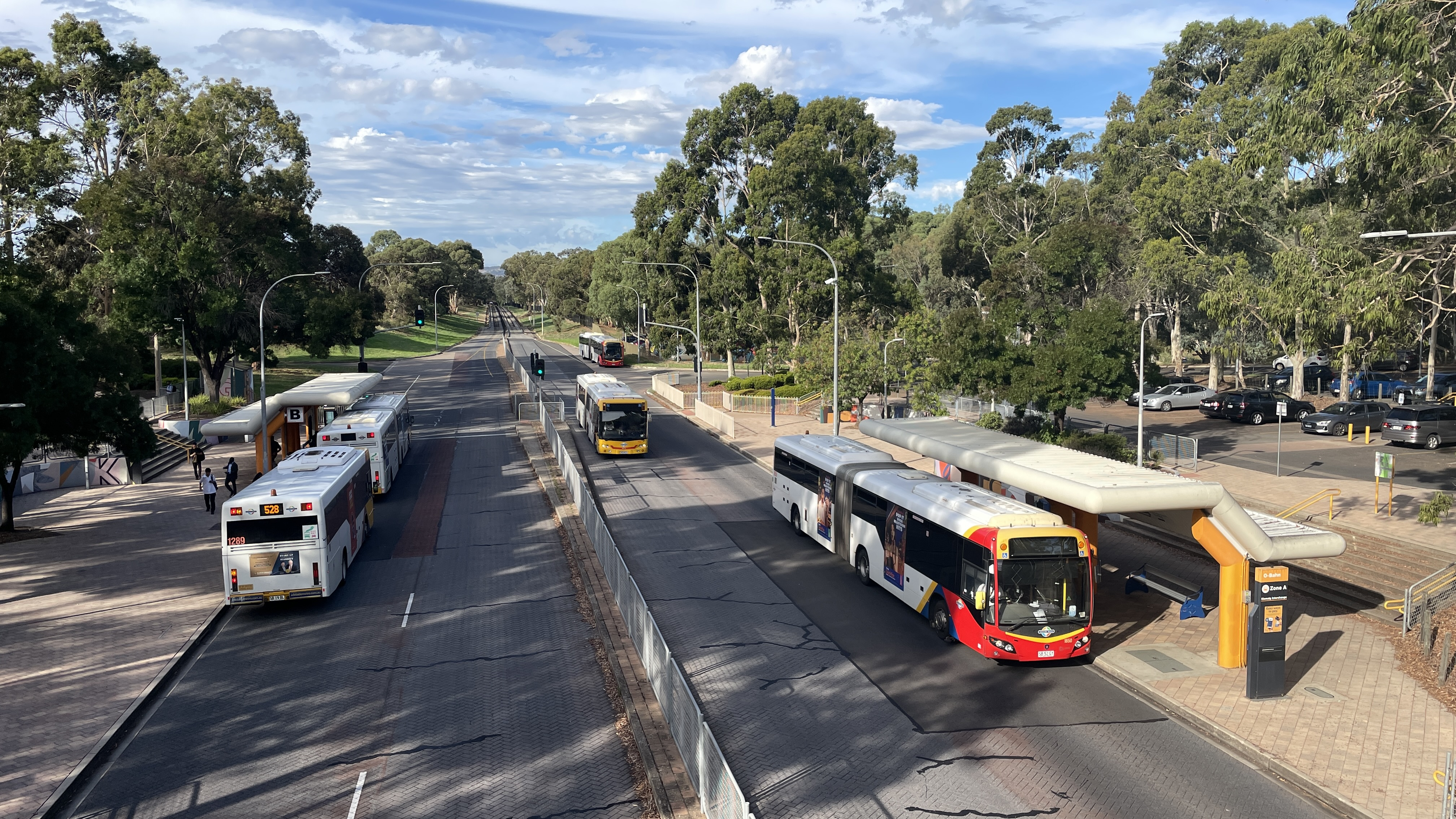
Buses at street level Klemzig Interchange, transition point to O-Bahn trackway visible in distance

In search of a replacement for the light rail project, the government sent experts to examine an innovative guided bus system being developed in West Germany by Daimler-Benz. From the German Omnibus (bus) and Bahn (path or way, as in Autobahn for automobiles and Eisenbahn or just Bahn for railway, e.g. S-Bahn and U-Bahn), the O-Bahn system was developed for use in tram tunnels in Essen. After extensive consultations with German authorities, State Transport Authority engineers decided the O-Bahn could be used. The system was seen as far superior to previous proposals; it used less land, made less noise, was faster and cost less. In addition, its unique feature of a non-transfer service direct from suburban streets to the city centre made it more attractive. Plans were drawn up for a length of 12 kilometres (7.5 mi): initially only three kilometres (1.9 mi) were to be constructed as O-Bahn, with the rest being conventional busway. However, safety concerns and public opposition led to O-Bahn being used for the entire length. Construction began in 1983 for the first section to Paradise Interchange. Another change of Government in 1982 resulted in uncertainty over the future of the project. The John Bannon Government, after consultations, decided to continue with Stage 1 (City to Paradise) and in 1986 proceeded with Stage 2 (Paradise to Tea Tree Plaza). The cost of the project was $98 million, including the buses.

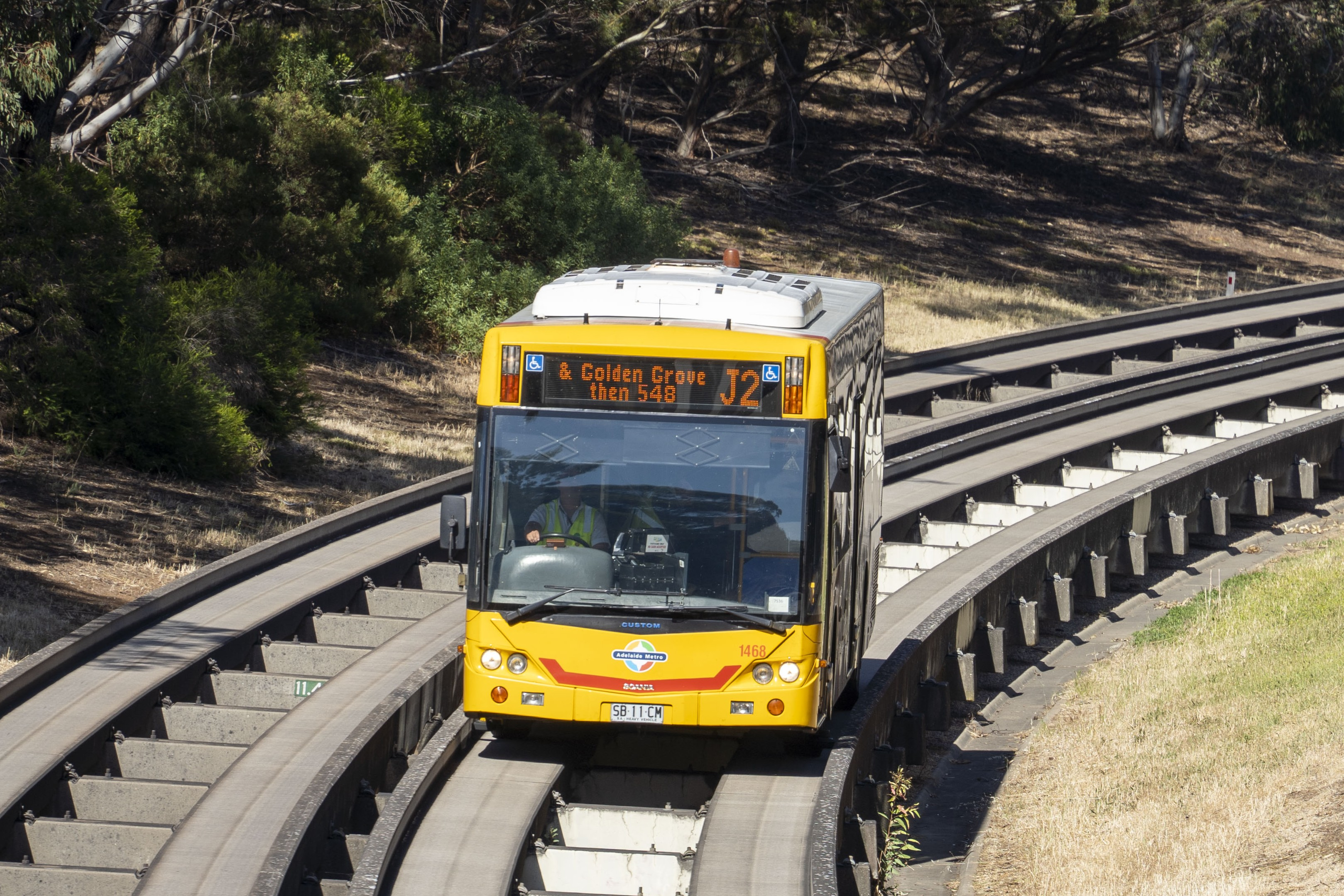
Bus serving J2 City Route on trackway between Harbour Town and Golden Grove

Stage 1 opened on 9 March 1986. Stage 2 opened on 20 August 1989.

The O-Bahn had more than 4 million passenger trips in the year after completion of Stage 1 in 1986, with a 30% increase the following year. When the completed O-Bahn was opened on 20 August 1989, passenger numbers rose another 17%. The Adelaide public transport system was privatised in the 1990s and overall patronage across all systems (bus, rail and tram) dropped 25%. The exception to this was the O-Bahn with no decrease, and there were 19,500 passenger trips daily in 1996 (7.13 million a year). As of 2015, the busway carries approximately 31,000 people per weekday.

=== Expansion proposals ===
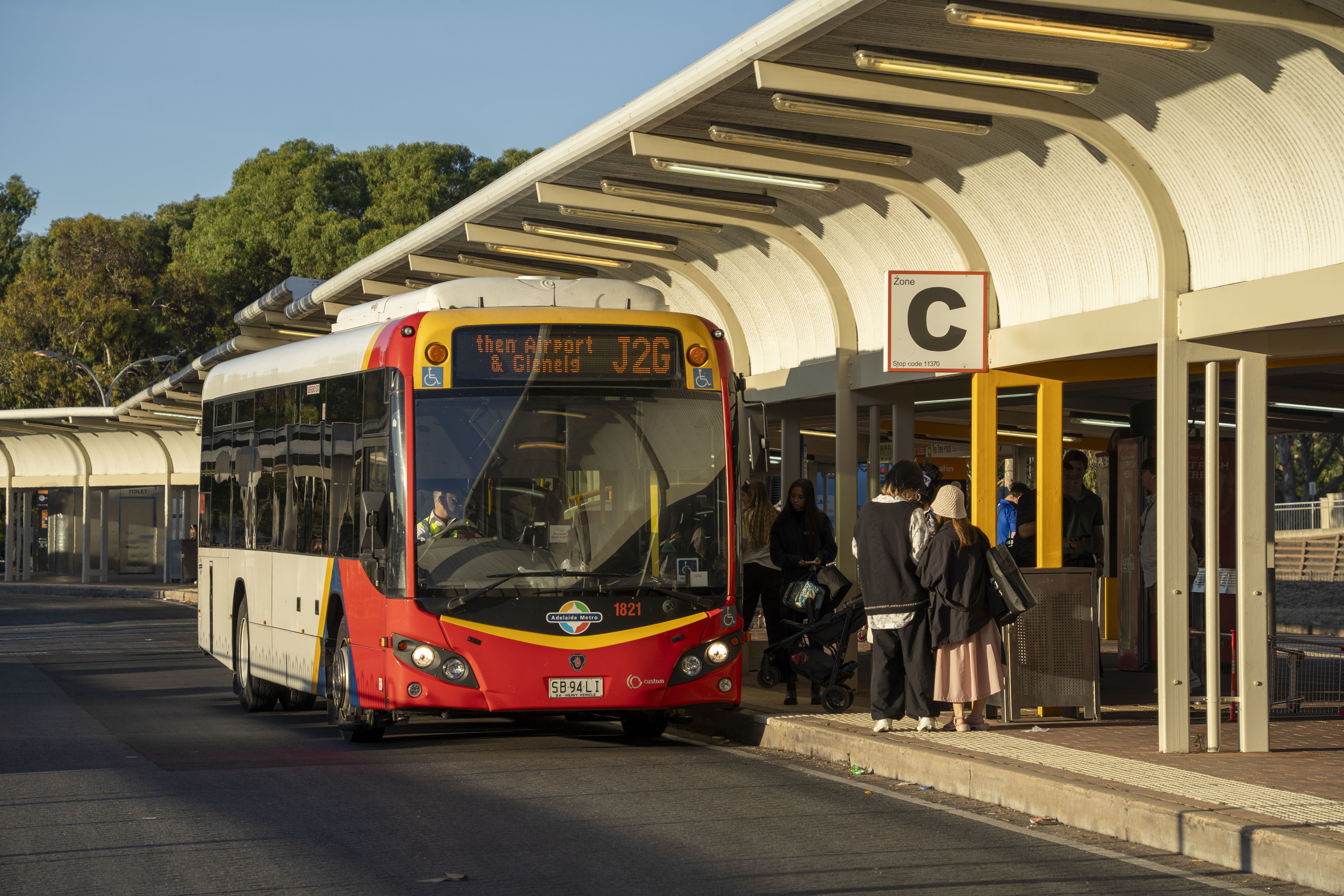
Riders boarding O-Bahn bus at Tea Tree Plaza Interchange

There have been a number of proposals to extend the O-Bahn to Golden Grove or build other routes, but none have progressed beyond consultation. An extension to Golden Grove would require the acquisition of extensive tracts of private property, due to the absence of an available corridor. Population increase in the area is negligible, although sprawl continues from Tea Tree Plaza Interchange for another eight kilometres to the Adelaide Hills. The current route was built with an allowance for a station at Grand Junction Road but it has not been built.

A southern O-Bahn proposal attracted the most attention and has been the subject of various studies and Parliamentary Committees as to its viability since 1996. The rail route through Adelaide's far south is off-centre, without the large catchment area of a more central transport route. An O-Bahn running direct through the region would be able to take advantage of an already large population and the continuing growth in the area.

One suggested route for an O-Bahn was for an alignment adjacent to the Noarlunga Centre railway line from the city to the Tonsley line. The O-Bahn would end there, with buses continuing on the Southern Expressway through the far south. Construction of this O-Bahn would require moving the railway track slightly to fit the O-Bahn alongside. In addition, Emerson Crossing and the Goodwood Overpass would require alteration. The estimated cost of construction, $182 million, was considered too expensive, and the proposal was suspended in 2001. Since then, the Government has focused on upgrading South Road and extending the Glenelg tram line.

There was a 2009 plan that bus routes serving the O-Bahn would be enhanced from Hackney Road along Grenfell and Currie Streets and extended to West Terrace on the far side of the CBD along dedicated bus lanes. However, the Federal Government announced in January 2011, as part of its response to the 2010–11 Queensland floods, that the extension would be cancelled "as a result of a significant scope reduction of the original project, resulting in only limited transport benefits".

=== O-Bahn City Access Project ===
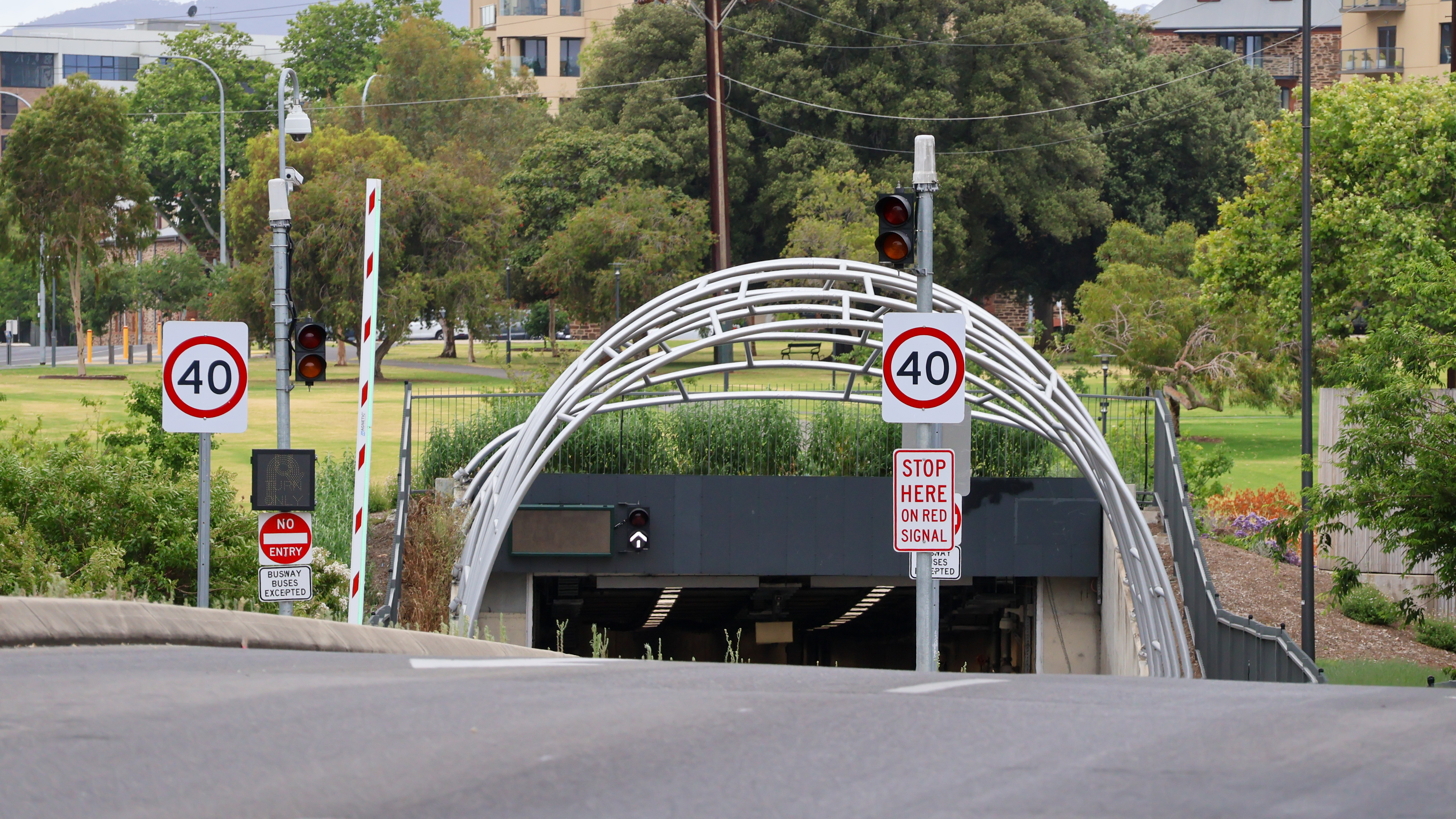
Entrance to the City Access project tunnel at Grenfell Street

In 2015, the Department of Planning, Transport & Infrastructure announced a $160 million proposed O-Bahn City Access Project. The existing entry/exit at Hackney Road was retained, but upgraded bus-only lanes on Hackney Road now lead to a new tunnel portal with bus guide rails commencing near the Adelaide Botanic Garden. The tunnel passes under the Botanic Road intersection, then curves west under Rundle Park / Kadlitpina, Rundle Street and surfaces in Rymill Park leading to a redesigned intersection at Grenfell Street and East Terrace. Construction started in late 2015 and completed in 2017. The contract to complete the detailed design and construct the tunnel was let to McConnell Dowell in October 2015. Sage Automation provided expertise in the mechanical and electrical aspects of the tunnel including ventilation and safety systems. Construction started in March 2016 with the removal of the median strip and preparation of central bus lanes. The tunnel opened on 10 December 2017, with limited services starting the next day. It started full operation on 17 December.

== Effects on local development ==
The O-Bahn has caused a clustering of commercial and community development near the Tea Tree Plaza Interchange, as service-providing organisations and businesses have sought to exploit the area's easy accessibility to public transport and the city centre. Market imperatives have also been aided by the zoning of the land around the area as commercial rather than residential. The area around Tea Tree Plaza is one of five designated regional centres within the Adelaide metropolis.

According to Robert Cervero, the O-Bahn has "accelerated the conversion of Tea Tree Gully from a somewhat sterile new town designed around a regional shopping mall to an emerging urban village featuring a wide range of land uses". The large Modbury Hospital is adjacent to the interchange, and the Torrens Valley campus of TAFE was built directly to the east of the busway after it opened. One government high school, three primary schools, one Christian school and three retirement villages are within a kilometre of the interchange. In contrast, there has been opposition to the area surrounding Klemzig Interchange and Paradise Interchange being used for any purpose other than low-density housing and no transit-oriented development has occurred.

== Environment ==
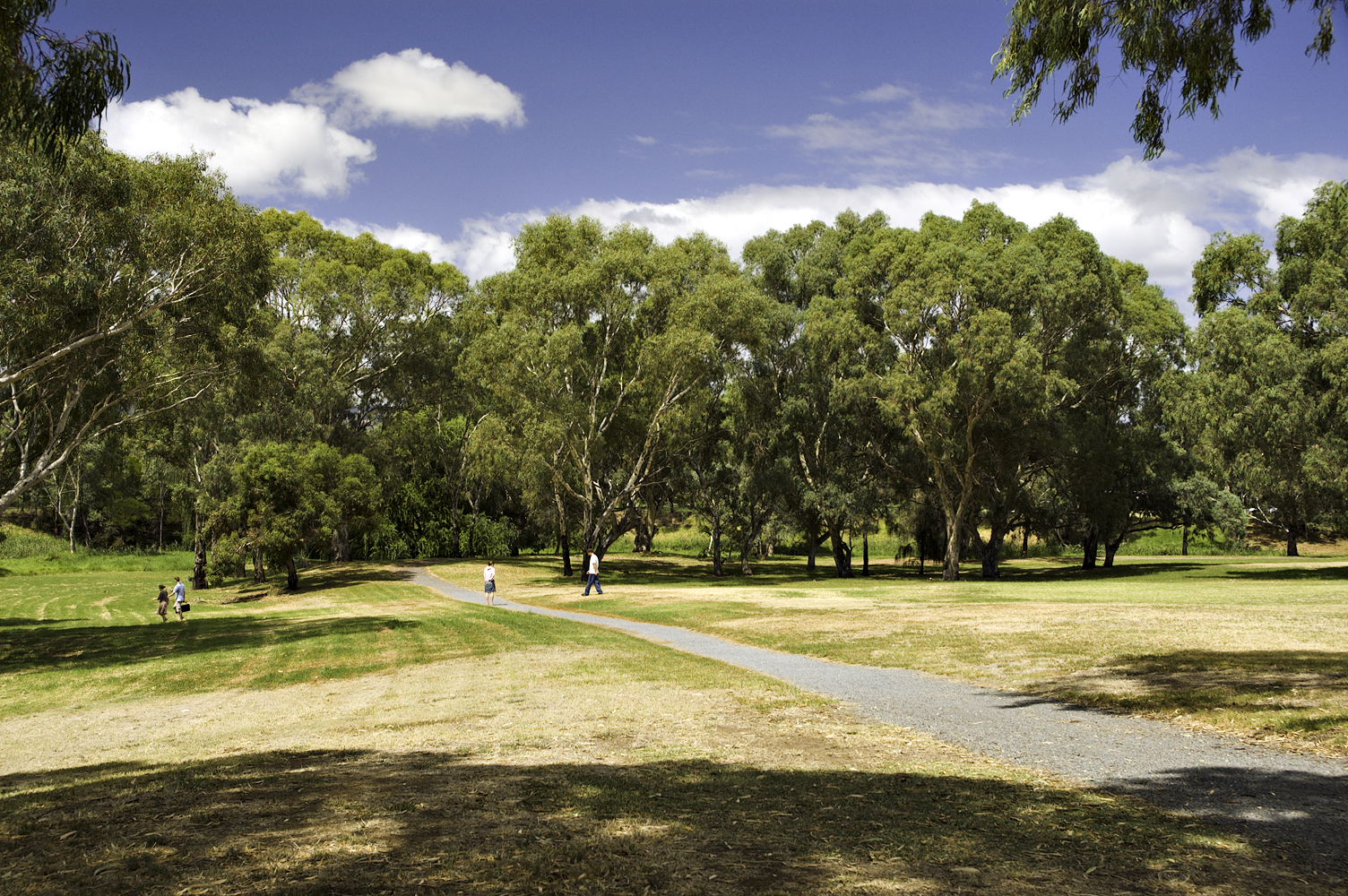
Linear Park near Paradise Interchange

The construction of the O-Bahn, rather than the previously proposed Modbury Freeway, was motivated by a desire to reduce car dependency. $6 million was used for the redevelopment of the Torrens Gorge, in which the Torrens Linear Park was created. About 150,000 trees, plants and shrubs were planted alongside the track for aesthetic, environmental and noise-reduction purposes; planting was completed in 1997. Walking trails and cycling paths were built along the park to encourage public use. Torrens Linear Park rejuvenated the river, which had deteriorated to the extent of being a de facto "urban drain, littered with rubbish and inaccessible to the public". Arising from environmental considerations, the O-Bahn is carbon-neutral due to the absorption of carbon dioxide by the trees alongside it. The track itself is situated in a valley due to it being near a riverbed and the elevation was further lowered by digging further depressions in order to reduce the noise impact on adjacent dwellings.

The original buses ran on diesel fuel, but the system allows for buses that run on alternative energy sources. Biodiesel fuel and natural gas have been trialled; as of 2014, 20% of the Adelaide bus fleet uses compressed natural gas, 48% B20 and 32% B5 biodiesel blends. The design of the O-Bahn allows for the installation of overhead wires for trolleybuses.

== See also ==
- Guided bus
- List of bus rapid transit systems

== Notes ==
- Transport Department reference documents are held by the State Library of South Australia. They are not published works, but a collection of in-department papers and brochures for the general public.
