= Westfield Tea Tree Plaza =

Coordinates: 34°49′54″S 138°41′29″E

- Location: Modbury, South Australia
- Opened: 1970
- Developer: Myer
- Owner: AMP Capital (50%); Scentre Group (50%)
- Num. of stores: 245
- Num. of anchor tenants: 8
- Floor area: 99,873 m^{2} (1,075,024 sq ft)
- Floors: 2
- Parking: 4,500 over 3 floors
- Website: westfield.com.au/teatreeplaza

Westfield Tea Tree Plaza, known simply as Tea Tree Plaza or TTP, is a large shopping centre located in Modbury serving as a shopping hub for Adelaide's growing north eastern suburbs, it is linked to the city by Adelaide's O-Bahn Busway, which terminates at the Tea Tree Plaza Interchange. Major tenants include Myer, Harris Scarfe, Target, Kmart, Big W, Woolworths, Coles, Aldi and Hoyts. With 245 stores, Tea Tree Plaza is the second largest shopping centre in Adelaide, only Westfield Marion is larger. There is a smaller shopping centre building called Tea Tree Plus slightly to the north of the main centre.

== History ==
The centre was built by Myer as part of an extensive subdivision of the area, which at the time was the largest remaining underdeveloped, nonindustrial land in the Adelaide metropolitan area. The centre opened in September 1970. Located in the City of Tea Tree Gully, it is the major shopping hub for the north-east of Adelaide. In November 1994 AMP Capital purchased Coles Myers' 50% stake in the centre. Tea Tree Plaza is owned by AMP Capital and the Scentre Group, each owning 50%.

A major A$190 million expansion announced in 2006, to incorporate Tea Tree Plus and add about 95 new stores and a four-storey car park has been put on hold. If the redevelopment is completed, the total number of stores will equate to about 336 retailers. It was still in development in 2013, with building approval having lapsed twice and been extended then lapsed again, while Westfield had successfully proposed to reduce the car park to two storeys.

In May 2017, it was said that a new $235 million upgrade would be made to the precinct, upgrading the existing Hoyts to a "Lux" cinema, as well as upgrading the entrance and food court. The first stage of these upgrades was completed in October 2018. It is said to bring up to a total of 95 new shops within 5 years and attract major outlets such as H&M and Uniqlo.

Following Myer's decision to shrink its store by one floor, JB Hi-Fi, Mecca and a combined Timezone and Zone Bowling opened on Tea Tree Plaza's ground floor in 2024.
