= Dead Man's Float =

- Directed by: Peter Sharp
- Written by: Roger Vaughan Carr
- Based on: novel Deadman's Float by Roger Vaughan Carr
- Produced by: Tom Broadbridge
- Starring: Sally Boyden; Greg Rowe; Bill Hunter; Jacqui Gordon
- Release date: 1980
- Running time: 70 minutes
- Country: Australia
- Language: English

Dead Man's Float (also known as Smuggler’s Cove) is a 1980 Australian film about a group of young kids who uncover smugglers, and try to foil their plans.

== Cast ==
- Sally Boyden as Anne
- Greg Rowe
- Bill Hunter as Eddie Bell
- Jacqui Gordon as Sue
- Christopher Milne as Thug 1
- Rick Ireland as Pete Dobraski
- Gus Mercurio as Mr Dobraski
- Sue Jones as Shirley Bell
