= Blue Fin =

1978 film

- DVD cover
- Directed by: Carl Schultz
- Written by: Sonia Borg
- Based on: novel by Colin Thiele
- Produced by: Hal McElroy
- Starring: Hardy Krüger; Greg Rowe; Elspeth Ballantyne
- Cinematography: Geoff Burton
- Edited by: Rod Adamson
- Music by: Michael Carlos
- Production companies: South Australian Film Corporation; McElroy & McElroy
- Distributed by: Pacific International Enterprises
- Release date: November 1978
- Running time: 95 minutes
- Country: Australia
- Language: English
- Budget: AU $750,000
- Box office: AU $703,000 (Australia)

Blue Fin is a 1978 Australian family film directed by Carl Schultz and starring Hardy Krüger, Greg Rowe and Elspeth Ballantyne. It is based on a 1969 Australian novel written by Colin Thiele.

== Plot ==
Based on the children's novel by South Australian author Colin Thiele, this is a father and son story about tuna fishing of southern bluefin tuna in South Australia's Port Lincoln fishing district. Accident-prone son Snook is forever making mistakes much to the chagrin of his father Pascoe. But when tragedy strikes the fishing boat during a deep sea fishing trek in the Southern Ocean, the boy is called on to become a man in a rites of sea passage to reconcile his past mishaps and save both his father and the ship from certain disaster.

Twelve-year-old Steve Pascoe is nicknamed 'Snook' by everyone in Port Lincoln. He's thin and long-faced, like the fish he's named after. At school he's no good at sport and, at home, his father scorns him. Snook joins his father and fellow crewmen on a tuna-fishing expedition, when disaster strikes. It is up to Snook to save himself and his father from a desperate situation.

== Cast ==
- Hardy Krüger as Bill Pascoe
- Greg Rowe as Steve 'Snook' Pascoe
- Liddy Clark as Ruth Pascoe
- Elspeth Ballantyne as Mrs. Pascoe
- John Jarratt as Sam Snell
- Hugh Keays-Byrne as Stan
- George Spartels as Con
- Terry Camilleri as Truckie
- Max Cullen as Pensioner
- John Frawley

== Production ==
The film is an unofficial follow up to Storm Boy (1976) with the same writer and star, also adapted from a Colin Thiele novel. The South Australian Film Corporation (SAFC) did not want to use Henri Safran as director, though, so employed another director from the ABC, Carl Schultz.

The film was shot in Streaky Bay in mid 1978.

=== Reshoots ===
During post production editor Rod Adamson claimed the film would not cut together. Five weeks after filming had completed, Schultz had to leave the film to take up a directing job at the ABC. Accordingly, Matt Carroll of the SAFC called in Bruce Beresford, who was under contract to them, to re-shoot some sequences. Some of these had to be done using a body double for Hardy Kruger since he had returned to Europe. Schultz was supportive of Beresford stepping in but was unhappy with the fact he supervised the final re-cut.

== Proposed Remake ==
In 2017 it was announced the movie would be remade.

== DVD release ==
A DVD was released on 1 January 2003.
