= West Beach, South Australia =

West Beach
- Suburb
- Coordinates: 34°56′43″S 138°30′14″E
- Country: Australia
- State: South Australia
- City: Adelaide
- LGAs: City of West Torrens; City of Charles Sturt

Government
  - State electorate: Colton
  - Federal division: Hindmarsh

Population
  - Total: 5,175 (SAL 2021)
- Postcode: 5024
Suburbs around West Beach
	Henley Beach South, Fulham	Lockleys
Gulf St Vincent	West Beach	Adelaide Airport
	Glenelg North	Glenelg North

West Beach is a seaside suburb of Adelaide, South Australia. It is located predominantly within the City of West Torrens, with the remainder in the City of Charles Sturt; the latter council area contains most of the suburb's residential land.

== History ==
West Beach was first laid out in 1929 by Sir Lancelot Stirling, Sir Frank Moulden and Arnold M. Moulden, as trustees of 'The Settled Estates of F.J. and P.J. Gray'.

This estate which in future will be known as "West Beach" at present consists of high undulating sandhills. The party inspected the work accomplished. This comprised the continuance to the sea, the distance of about a mile, of the Richmond Road, which previously stopped at the Tapley's Hill Road; the grading and topdressing of the sandhills, involving the removal of 200,000 tons of sand, and the building of an esplanade and three roads connecting it with Military Road, which was raised 8 feet and remade. The whole of the work was carried out under the order of the Supreme Court and the town was laid out under the approval of the town planner (Mr W. Scott Griffiths)....

West Beach Post Office opened on 5 May 1959 and closed in March 1982. In July 1982 West Beach North office (open since 1964) was renamed West Beach.

Marineland was an iconic South Australian marine park, located in West Beach from 1969 until its closure in 1988. The popular marine park was where Mr. Percival, the Australian Pelican, who was noted for his starring role in the Australian Movie Storm Boy was born and lived.

== Demographics ==
The 2021 Census by the Australian Bureau of Statistics counted 5,175 people in West Beach on census night. Of these, 49.1% were male and 50.9% were female.

The majority of residents (74.3%) are of Australian birth, with the other common census response being England (6.2%).

The age distribution of West Beach residents is skewed towards a slightly higher age bracket than the greater Australian population. 73.6% of residents were over 25 years in 2006, compared to the Australian average of 66.5%; and 26.4% were younger than 25 years, compared to the Australian average of 33.5%.

== Attractions ==
=== Cycling ===
Cycling is a popular activity along the Adelaide Shores (of which West Beach is central), with cyclists travelling the coastal road or the 72 km of separated bike path overlooking St Vincent's Gulf, every day. In January 2010 cyclist Lance Armstrong, in Adelaide for the Tour Down Under, called for cyclists on Twitter to join him on a Sunday morning ride along the Adelaide shores through West Beach. An estimated 10,000 cyclists turned up at short notice and rode with Armstrong.

=== West Beach Parks ===
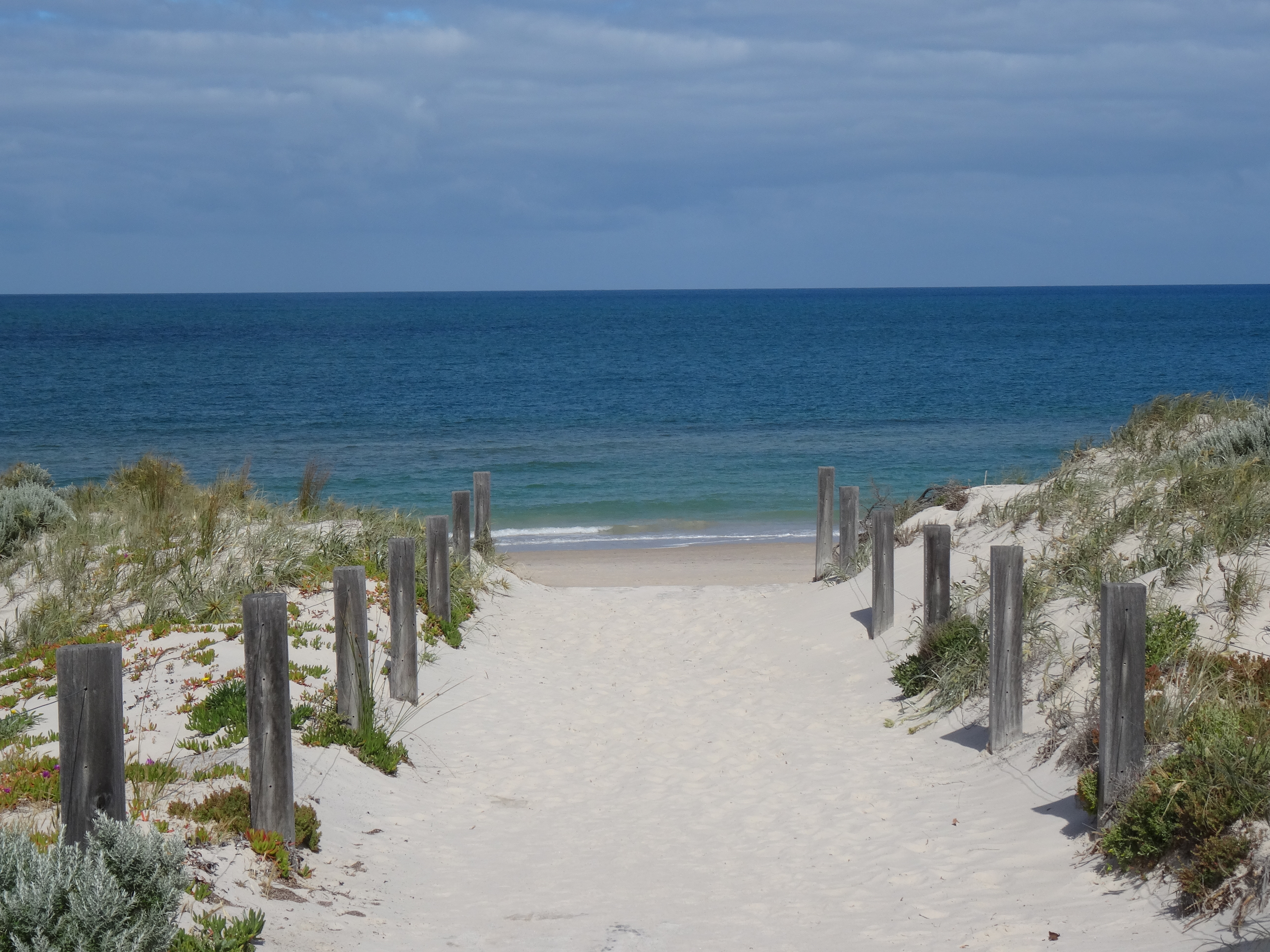
A walkway onto West Beach

West Beach Trust (marketed as West Beach Parks) is a statutory authority created under South Australia's West Beach Recreation Reserve Act 1987 to manage the reserve and its associated facilities. The West Beach Trust Board comprises representatives of the three local Councils and independent members. The West Beach Parks Precinct covers 135 hectares of beachfront land and comprises two accommodation properties, two public golf courses, diverse competition level sporting facilities, meeting and events venues, a boat haven and a broad range of lessees.

West Beach Parks is a tourism, sport and recreation precinct. West Beach Parks is responsible for managing the West Beach Recreation Reserve, an area of significant natural assets, and its commercial and community facilities including accommodation, boating, a coastal park, golfing, leisure and sports West Beach Parks has a number of tenants, including; The Adelaide Sailing Club, Football Federation SA, Softball SA, Surf Life Saving SA and the Westward Ho Golf Club.

The redeveloped $10 million West Beach Surf Life Saving Club, funded by federal, state and local governments with its bar and restaurant is an attraction at West Beach.

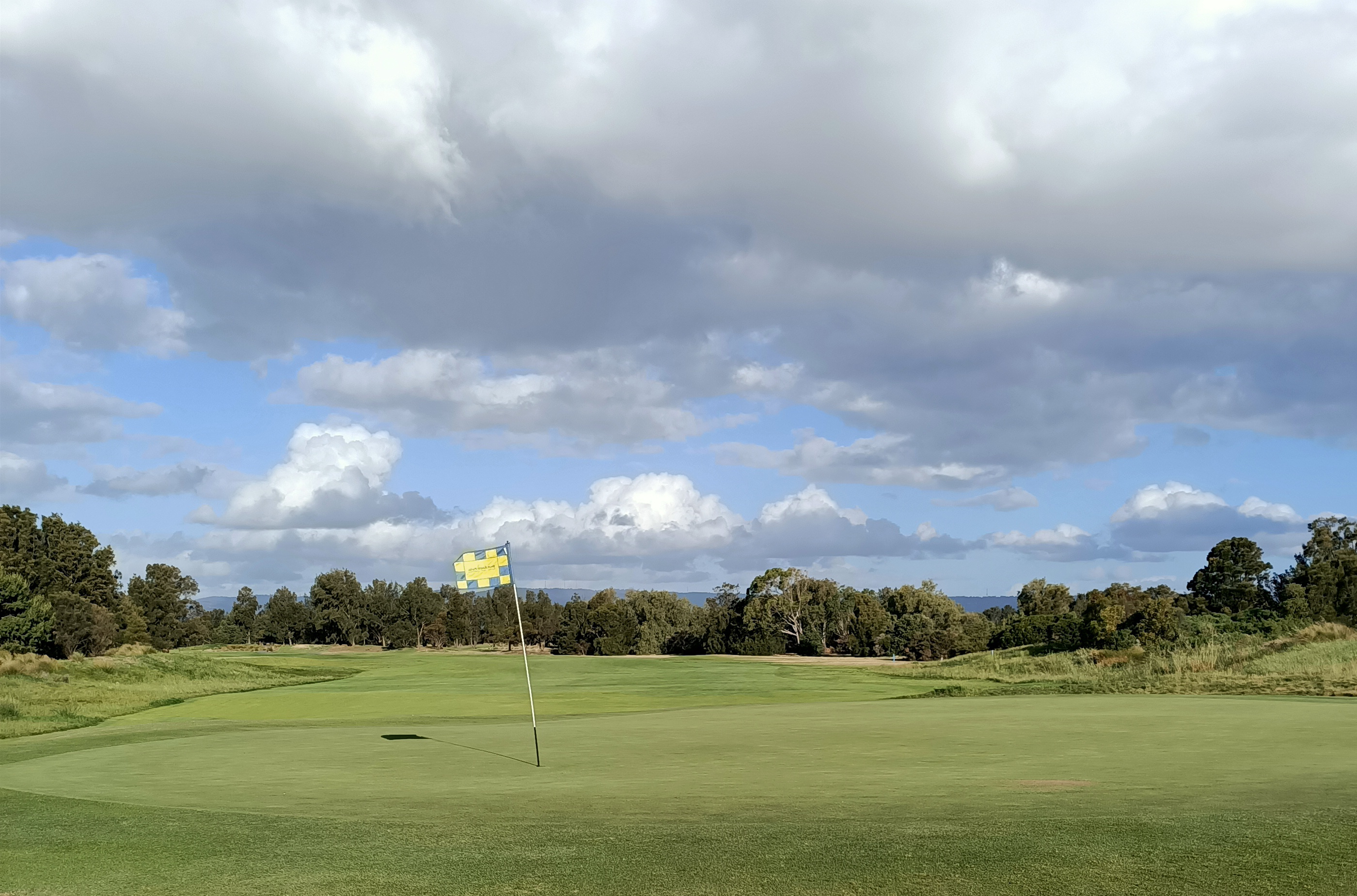
A green on the Patawalonga Golf Course

=== Golf ===
The Westward Ho Golf Club, which was established in 1957, sits on the Patawalonga Golf Course.

The shopping centre on Burbridge Road services the suburb.

=== Parks ===
There are numerous parks and greenspaces throughout West Beach, the largest known as Apex Park. Apex Park is a huge park along the River Torrens with playgrounds, horses and walkways.

== Transport ==
=== Roads ===
The suburb is serviced by the following main roads:

- Tapleys Hill Road, running north–south from Queenstown to Glenelg
- Sir Donald Bradman Drive, running east–west between the City of Adelaide and West Beach
- Burbridge Road

=== Public transport ===
The suburb is serviced by bus routes, operated by Adelaide Metro.

=== Airport ===
Adelaide Airport is in the adjacent suburb also named Adelaide Airport. There are frequent domestic and international flights and the airport is also used for private aviation.

== See also ==
- List of Adelaide suburbs
