= Klemzig Interchange =

Coordinates: 34.8862°S 138.6395°E

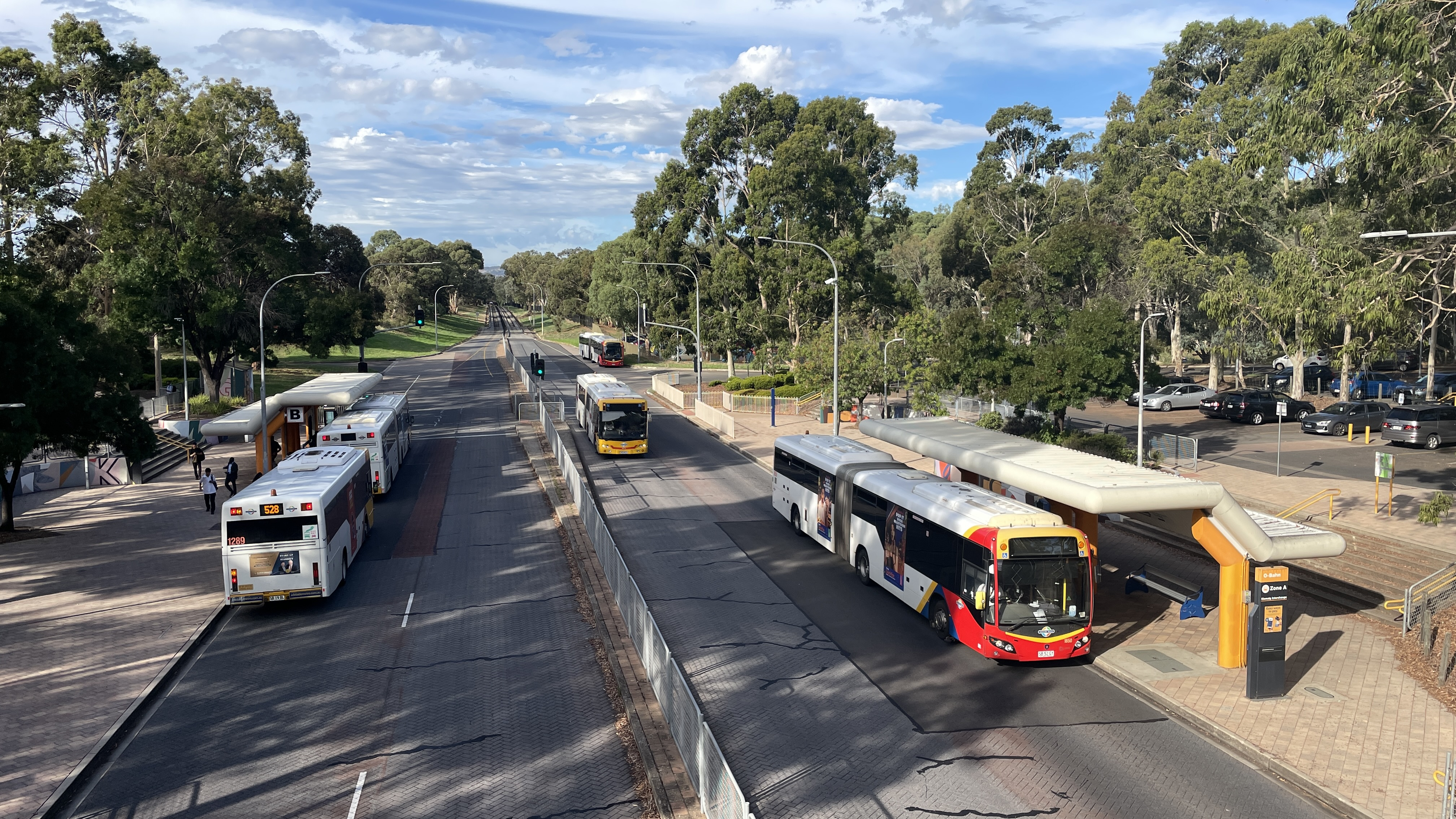
- Overview of Klemzig Interchange looking outbound

General information
- Location: First Avenue, Klemzig, South Australia
- Owner: Adelaide Metro
- Operator: Adelaide Metro
- Bus routes: AO1, AO2, AO3, AO4, AO5, C1, C2, INDSTB, G40, G40M, J1, J1A, J1G, J1T, J2, J2G, M44, M44T, N1, N502, N541, 500, 501, 502, 503, 506, 507, 528, 530, 540, 541, 541G, 544, 545, 546, 548, 556, 557, 559, 559S, 578, 928
- Bus stands: 2
- Bus operators: Torrens Transit

Construction
- Parking: Yes
- Accessible: Yes

Other information
- Station code: 16667 (Zone A); 17189 (Zone B)

History
- Opened: 9 March 1986

Services
| Preceding station | Adelaide Metro | Following station |
|---|---|---|
| through to Adelaide city centre via Grenfell Street | O-Bahn Busway | Paradise Interchange towards Tea Tree Plaza Interchange |
Location

Klemzig Interchange is a bus interchange operated by Adelaide Metro in Klemzig, South Australia as part of the O-Bahn Busway.

== History ==
Klemzig Interchange was built as part of Stage 1 of the O-Bahn Busway to Paradise Interchange. It was officially opened on 2 March 1986 by Premier John Bannon, with services commencing on 9 March. It is the first stop on the route, being located three kilometres from the Adelaide city centre on the eastern side of OG Road.

Klemzig Interchange was built to serve passengers connecting with the Circle Line bus service, which follows the Adelaide outer ring route. Many bus services bypass Klemzig and the station has limited capacity, being the smallest of the three busway stations on the O-Bahn, and the only one to not have buses leave the busway in revenue service until the introduction of services via the O-Bahn to Oakden. It is served by 29 routes.

== Bus routes ==
| Route number | Destination / description |
|---|---|
Zone A
| 500 | Elizabeth Interchange to City |
| 501 | Mawson Interchange to City |
| 502 | Salisbury Interchange to City |
| 503 | Tea Tree Plaza Interchange to City |
| 506 | Tea Tree Plaza Interchange to City |
| 507 | Tea Tree Plaza Interchange to City |
| 528 | Northgate to City |
| 530 | Firle to City |
| 540 | Tea Tree Plaza Interchange to City |
| 541 | Golden Grove Interchange to City |
| 544 | Golden Grove Interchange to City |
| 548 | Greenwith and Tea Tree Plaza Interchange to City |
| 556 | Tea Tree Plaza Interchange to City |
| 557 | Tea Tree Plaza Interchange to City |
| 578 | Newton, South Australia and Athelstone, South Australia to City |
| 559 | Tea Tree Plaza Interchange to City |
| C1 | Golden Grove Interchange to City |
| G40 | Golden Grove Interchange to Flinders University via City |
| N1 | Golden Grove Interchange to City; After midnight service between Saturday PM - Sunday AM |
| N502 | Salisbury Interchange to City; After midnight service between Saturday PM - Sunday AM |
| J1 | Elizabeth Interchange to Adelaide Airport and Glenelg via City |
| J2 | Greenwith, South Australia to Adelaide Airport and Glenelg via City |
| M44 | to Marion Shopping Centre via City |
Zone B
