= Tea Tree Plaza Interchange =

Bus station in Adelaide, Australia

Coordinates: 34°49′55″S 138°41′40″E

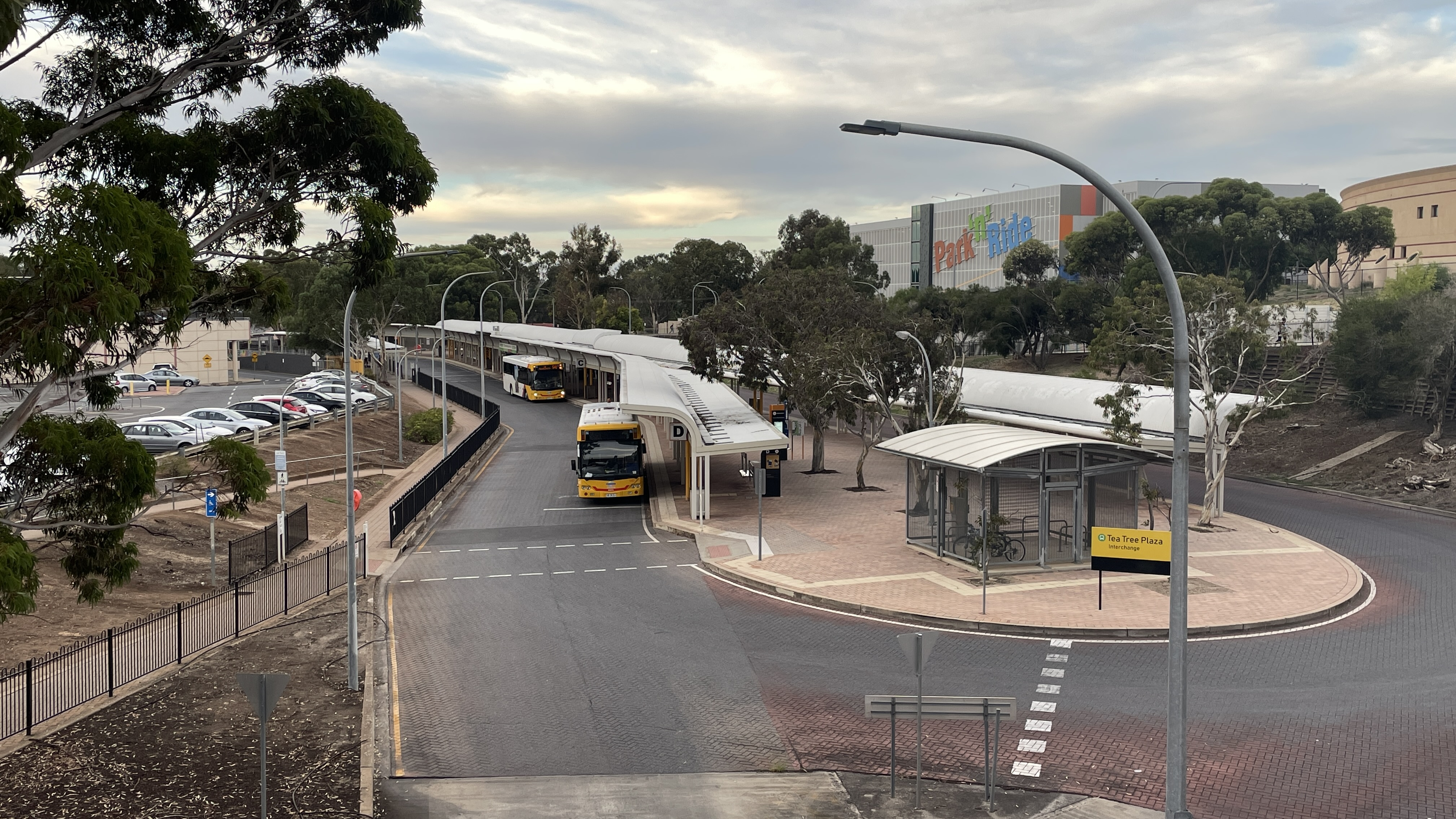
- View of Tea Tree Plaza Interchange from Smart Road

General information
- Location: Smart Road, Modbury, South Australia
- Owner: Adelaide Metro
- Operator: Adelaide Metro
- Bus routes: G40, J1, J2, M44, 203, 271, 361, 503, 506, 507, 540, 541, 541G, 541X, 542, 542X, 543, 543X, 544X, 545, 545X, 546X, 548, 556, 557, 559, 560,
- Bus stands: 8
- Bus operators: Link SA (Regional); Torrens Transit

Construction
- Parking: 700 bays
- Cycle facilities: Yes
- Accessible: Yes

Other information
- Station code: 11347 (Zone A); 11351 (Zone B); 11370 (Zone C); 11381 (Zone D); 11378 (Zone E); 11367 (Zone F); 11352 (Zone G); 11349 (Zone H)

History
- Opened: 20 August 1989

Services
Preceding station	Adelaide Metro	Following station
Paradise Interchange towards Klemzig Interchange	O-Bahn Busway	Terminus
Location

Tea Tree Plaza Interchange (formerly known as Modbury Interchange) is a bus interchange operated by Adelaide Metro in Modbury, South Australia as part of the O-Bahn Busway. It is a central public transport hub for the north eastern suburbs of Adelaide.

== History ==
Tea Tree Plaza Interchange was built as the terminating station of Stage 2 of the O-Bahn Busway from Paradise Interchange. It was opened on 20 August 1989 by Premier John Bannon. Originally named Modbury Interchange, it was renamed Tea Tree Plaza Interchange on 12 September 1997.

== 2013 redevelopments ==
On 24 February 2013, Premier Jay Weatherill announced a $17 million upgrade of facilities along the O-Bahn Busway, which included increased bicycle storage, real-time information screens and additional seating. As part of the upgrade, a $14 million multiple level carpark was built on the north-west corner of the Tea Tree Gully campus of TAFE SA. The carpark provides 700 spaces, 300 more than was previously available. The entrance to the carpark utilises the access road from Smart Road that was previously only used by buses entering the busway. The development is expected to meet consumer demand at the interchange until 2021. The carpark opened on 13 January 2014. However, some have criticised the move to charge non-MetroCARD holders $10, whereas those whose who have a metrocard are only charged $2.

== Nearby locations ==
The Westfield Tea Tree Plaza shopping centre and two others are very close by with parking available in those car parks, making it a popular interchange for city-goers and shoppers of the area. The interchange is also a popular hangout for students from the nearby Modbury South Primary School, The Heights School and Modbury High School, and the Ardtornish Primary School. The terminal is serviced by Schoolbus M and Schoolbus X in the mornings and Schoolbus E and Schoolbus P in the afternoons.

The interchange is approximately 10 minutes from the Golden Grove Interchange, approximately 20 minutes from the Greenwith Community Centre and approximately 10–15 minutes away from the Currie Street bus stop.

Other stations that service the O-Bahn include Paradise Interchange and Klemzig Interchange.

== Bus routes ==
Route number	Destination / description
Zone A
271	to City via North East Road. Service operates 7 days.
503	to Paradise Interchange via Valiant Road. Limited Peak services run via O-Bahn Busway to City
506	to Paradise Interchange via Para Hills. Limited Peak services run via O-Bahn Busway to City
507	to Paradise Interchange via St Agnes, Modbury, Holden Hill, Gilles Plains, Hillcrest, Paradise. Limited Peak services run via O-Bahn Busway to City
546	to City via Para Hills
Zone B
G40	to Flinders University via O-Bahn Busway, City & Goodwood Road
548	to City via Paradise Interchange, Klemzig Interchange & O-Bahn Busway
Zone C
C1	to City via Paradise Interchange, Klemzig Interchange & O-Bahn Busway
C2	to City via Paradise Interchange, Klemzig Interchange & O-Bahn Busway
M44	to Marion Interchange via O-Bahn Busway, City, Anzac Highway & Marion Road
N1	to City via Paradise Interchange, Klemzig Interchange & O-Bahn Busway (After midnight on Sunday mornings only)
541	to City via Paradise Interchange, Klemzig Interchange & O-Bahn Busway (Weekday trips only)
544	to City via Paradise Interchange, Klemzig Interchange & O-Bahn Busway
Zone D - 07:00 to 09:30 Mon-Fri only
541X	to City via O-Bahn Busway (Express Service)
542X	to City via O-Bahn Busway (Express Service)
543X	to City via O-Bahn Busway (Express Service)
545X	to City via O-Bahn Busway (Express Service)
546X	to City via O-Bahn Busway (Express Service)
Zone E
C1	to Elizabeth Interchange via Golden Grove Road, Golden Grove Village, Main North Road & Elizabeth Shopping Centre
C1G	to Golden Grove Village via Golden Grove Road
C1X	to Golden Grove Village via Golden Grove Road & The Golden Way
C2	to Greenwith via Golden Grove Road, Golden Grove Village & The Golden Way
C2X	to Greenwith via Golden Grove Road, Golden Grove Village & The Golden Way
M44	to Golden Grove Village via Ladywood Road & Richardson Drive
N1	to Golden Grove Village via Golden Grove Road (After midnight on Sunday mornings only)
544	to Golden Grove Village via Ladywood Road & Richardson Drive
Zone F
G40	to Golden Grove Village via Golden Grove Road & Bicentennial Drive
541	to Fairview Park via Smart Road & Hancock Road
541G	to Golden Grove Village via Smart Road & Hancock Road
541X	to Golden Grove Village via Smart Road & Hancock Road (Express service)
N541	to Fairview Park via Smart Road & Hancock Road (After midnight on Sunday mornings only)
542	to Fairview Park via North East Road, Elizabeth Street & Yatala Vale Road
543	to Surrey Downs via Arthur Street, Riverside Drive & Illyarrie Avenue
545	to Golden Grove Village via McIntyre Road & The Golden Way
548	to Greenwith via Golden Grove Road & Target Hill Road
Zone G
203	to City via Milne Road, Ingle Farm, Bridge Road & Hampstead Road
209F	to City via Milne Road, Ingle Farm, Hampstead Road & Main North Road
556	to City via Tolley Road, Valley Road, Lower North East Road, Paradise Interchange & O-Bahn Busway
557	to City via North East Road, Perseverance Road, Lower North East Road, Paradise Interchange & O-Bahn Busway
559	to Paradise Interchange via Smart Road, Hancock Road, Lower North East Road, Valley Road, Awoonga Road, Lyons Road & Brookvale Road
Zone H
361	to Port Adelaide via Helen Terrace & Grand Junction Road
560	to Elizabeth Interchange via Montague Road, Ingle Farm, Bridge Road, Smith Road, Salisbury Interchange, John Rice Avenue & Philip Highway
800	to Mount Pleasant via Houghton, Inglewood, Chain of Ponds, Gumeracha & Birdwood (Operated by Link SA)
801H	to Mount Torrens via Houghton, Paracombe, Cudlee Creek, Lobethal & Charleston (Operated by Link SA)
