= Henley Beach South, South Australia =

Henley Beach South
- Suburb
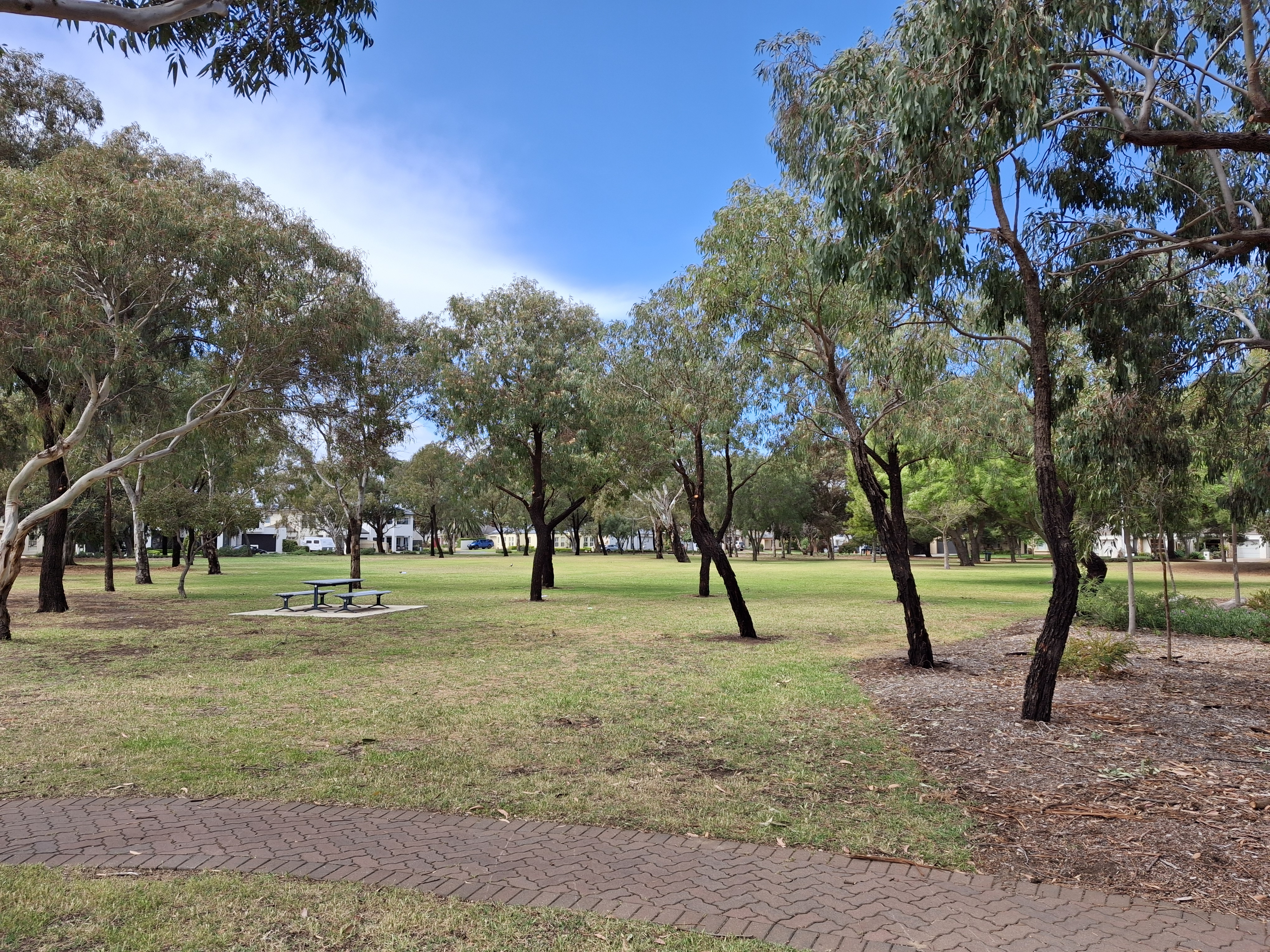
- William Atkin Reserve, Henley Beach South

- Coordinates: 34°55′37″S 138°30′04″E
- Country: Australia
- State: South Australia
- City: Adelaide
- LGA: City of Charles Sturt
- Location: 9 km (5.6 mi) W of Adelaide city centre

Government
  - State electorate: Colton (2011)
  - Federal division: Hindmarsh (2011)

Population
  - Total: 2,799 (SAL 2021)
- Postcode: 5022
Suburbs around Henley Beach South
	Henley Beach	Fulham
Gulf St Vincent	Henley Beach South	Fulham
	West Beach	West Beach

Henley Beach South is a coastal suburb of Adelaide, South Australia. It is located in the City of Charles Sturt.

== Geography ==
Henley Beach South lies between Henley Beach Road and the River Torrens Outlet. To the north is Henley Beach, to the east, Fulham and to the south, West Beach.

== Demographics ==
The 2021 Census by the Australian Bureau of Statistics counted 2,799 persons in Henley Beach South on census night. Of these, 48.3% were male and 51.7% were female.

76.1% of residents were of Australian birth, with a further 6.8% identifying England as their country of origin.

== Politics ==
=== Local government ===
Henley Beach South is part of Henley Ward in the City of Charles Sturt local government area, being represented in that council by Merlindie Fardone and Kenzie van den Nieuwelaar.

=== State and federal ===
Henley Beach South lies in the state electoral district of Colton and the federal electoral division of Hindmarsh. The suburb is represented in the South Australian House of Assembly by Matt Cowdrey and federally by Mark Butler.

== Community ==
=== Schools ===
Henley Beach Primary School is located on Hazel Terrace.

== Facilities and attractions ==
=== Parks ===
Torrens Linear Park lies along the River Torrens Outlet on the suburb's southern boundary. The beach of Henley Beach South extends the length of the suburb. There is also significant greenspace in the vicinity of Lexington Road.

== Transportation ==
=== Roads ===
Henley Beach South is serviced by Henley Beach Road, connecting the suburb to Adelaide city centre. Seaview Road traverses the suburb from north to south, roughly parallel with the coast.

=== Public transport ===
Henley Beach South is serviced by public transport buses operated by Adelaide Metro.

Trams serviced the suburb until 1957, running from the city along Henley Beach Road.

=== Bicycle routes ===
A bicycle path extends through Linear Park.

== Gallery ==
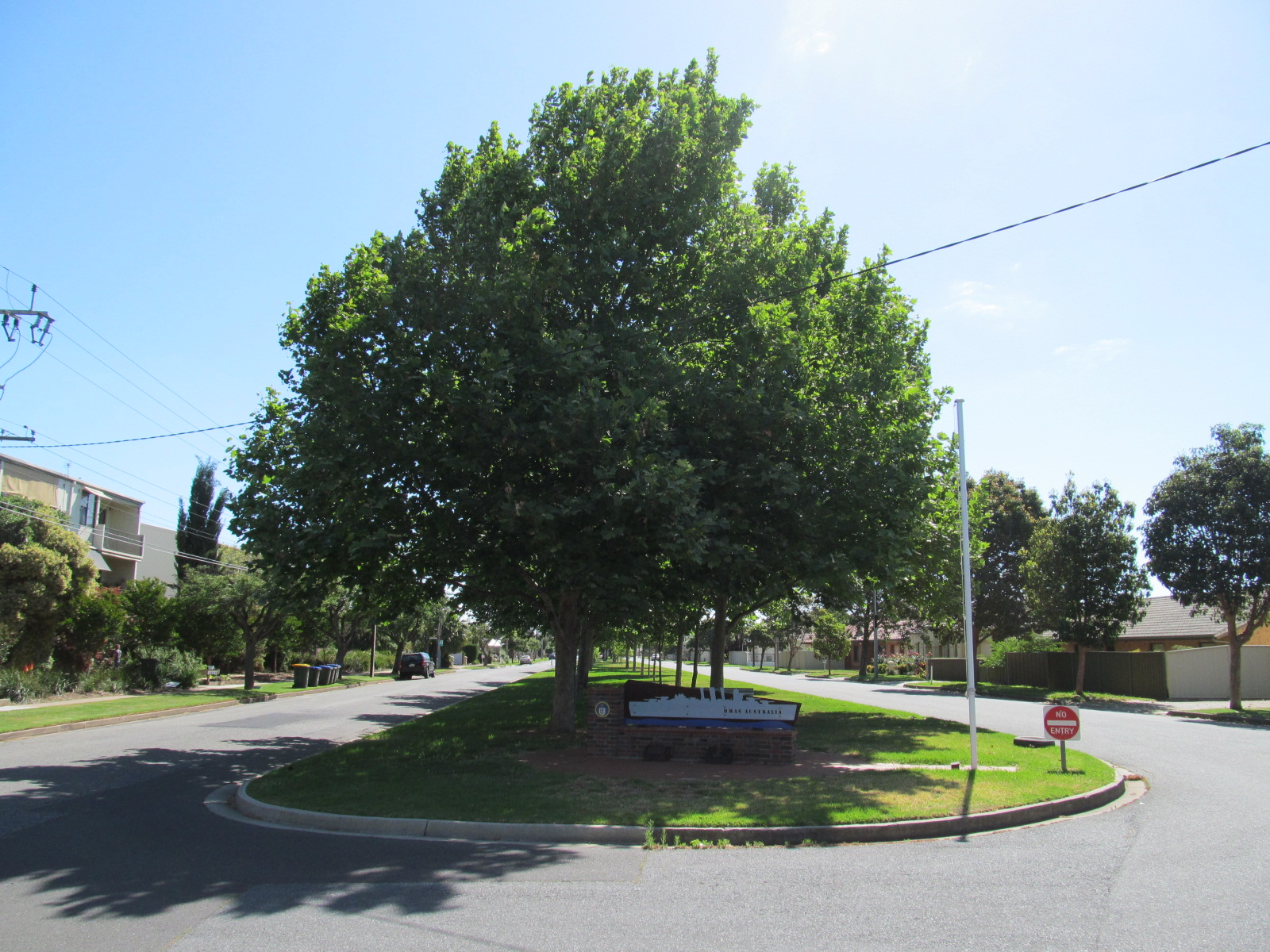
HMAS Australia Road, Henley Beach South

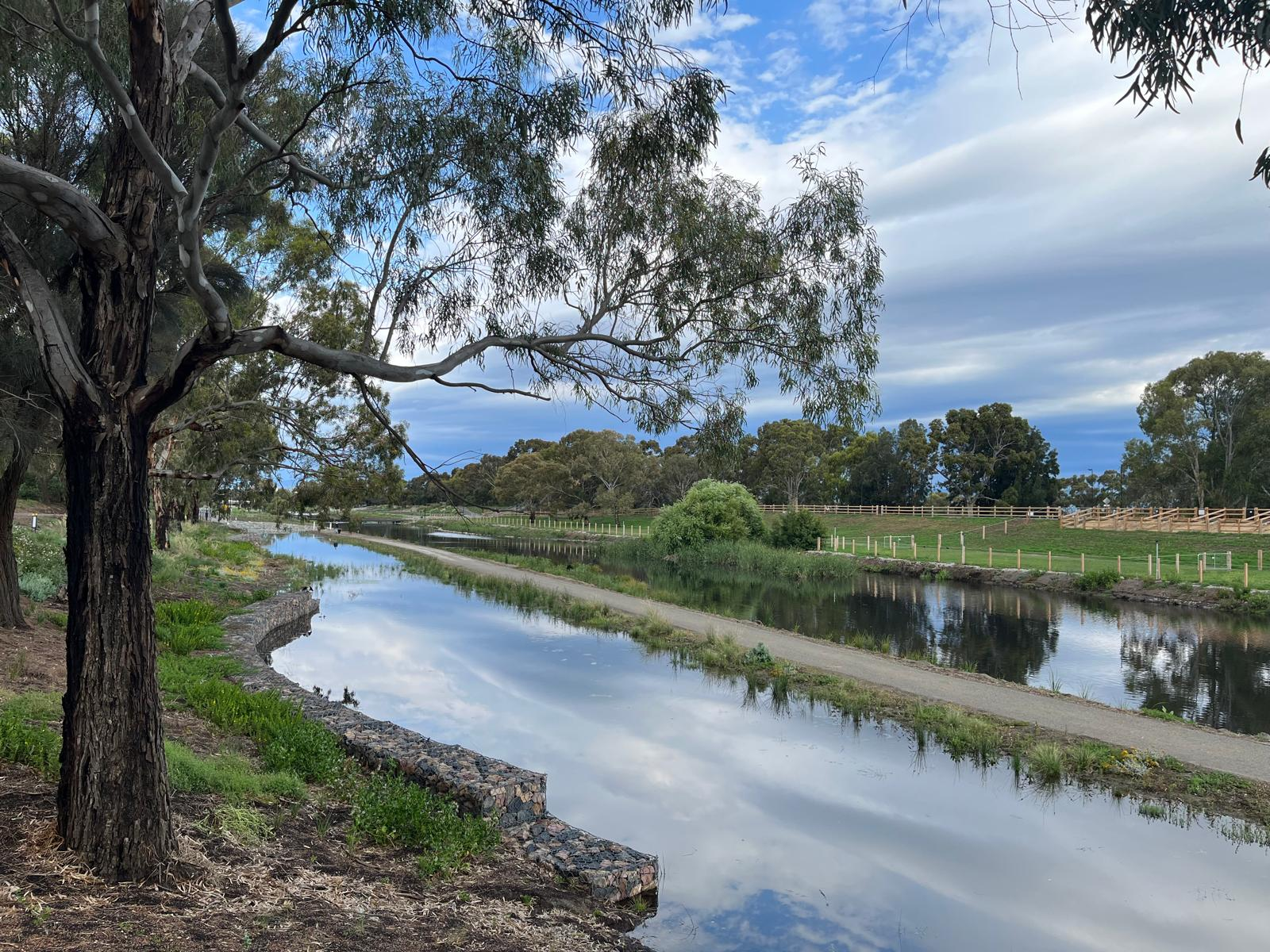
River Torrens Outlet, Henley Beach South, looking across to West Beach

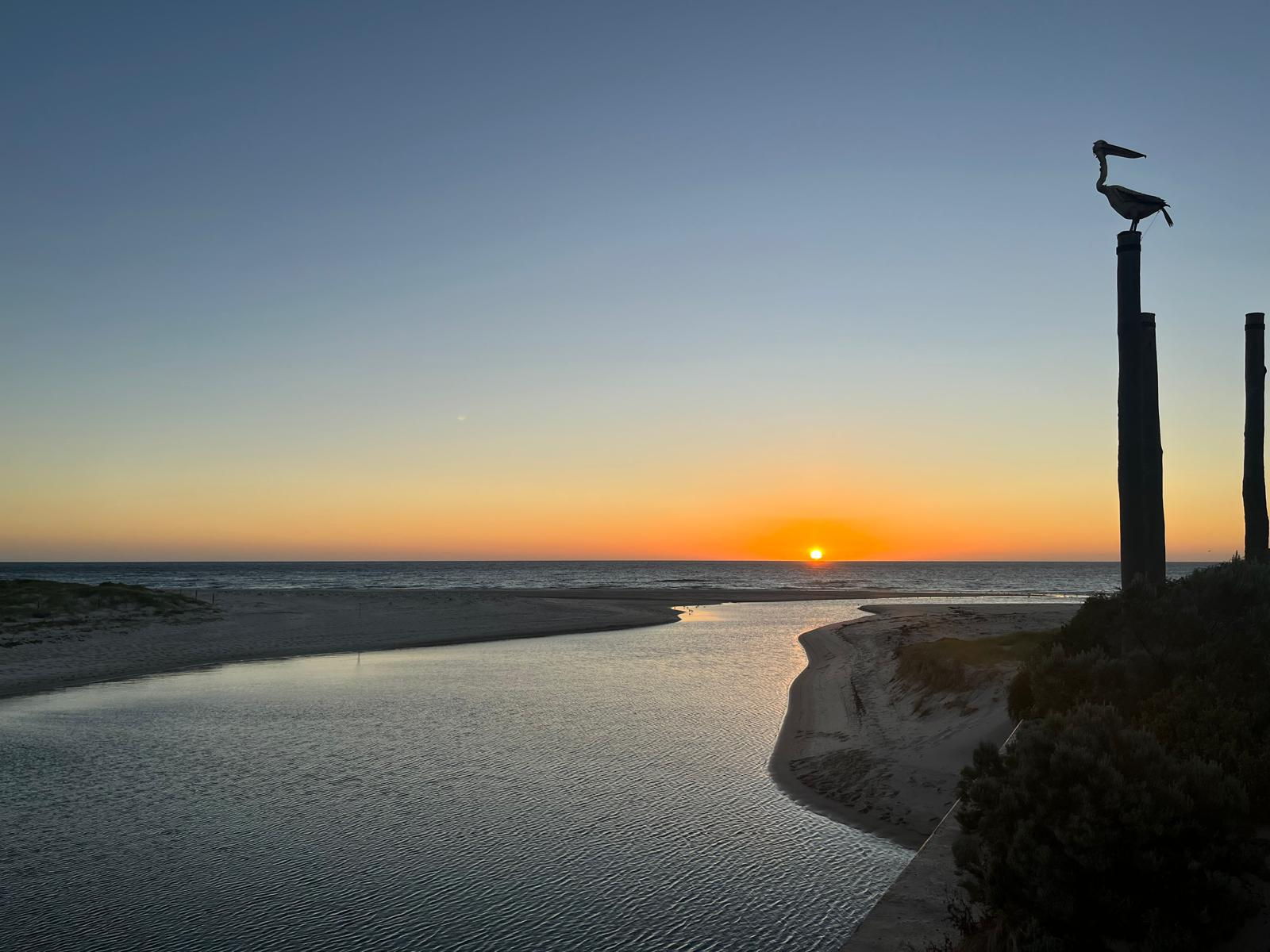
Mouth of the River Torrens from Henley Beach South

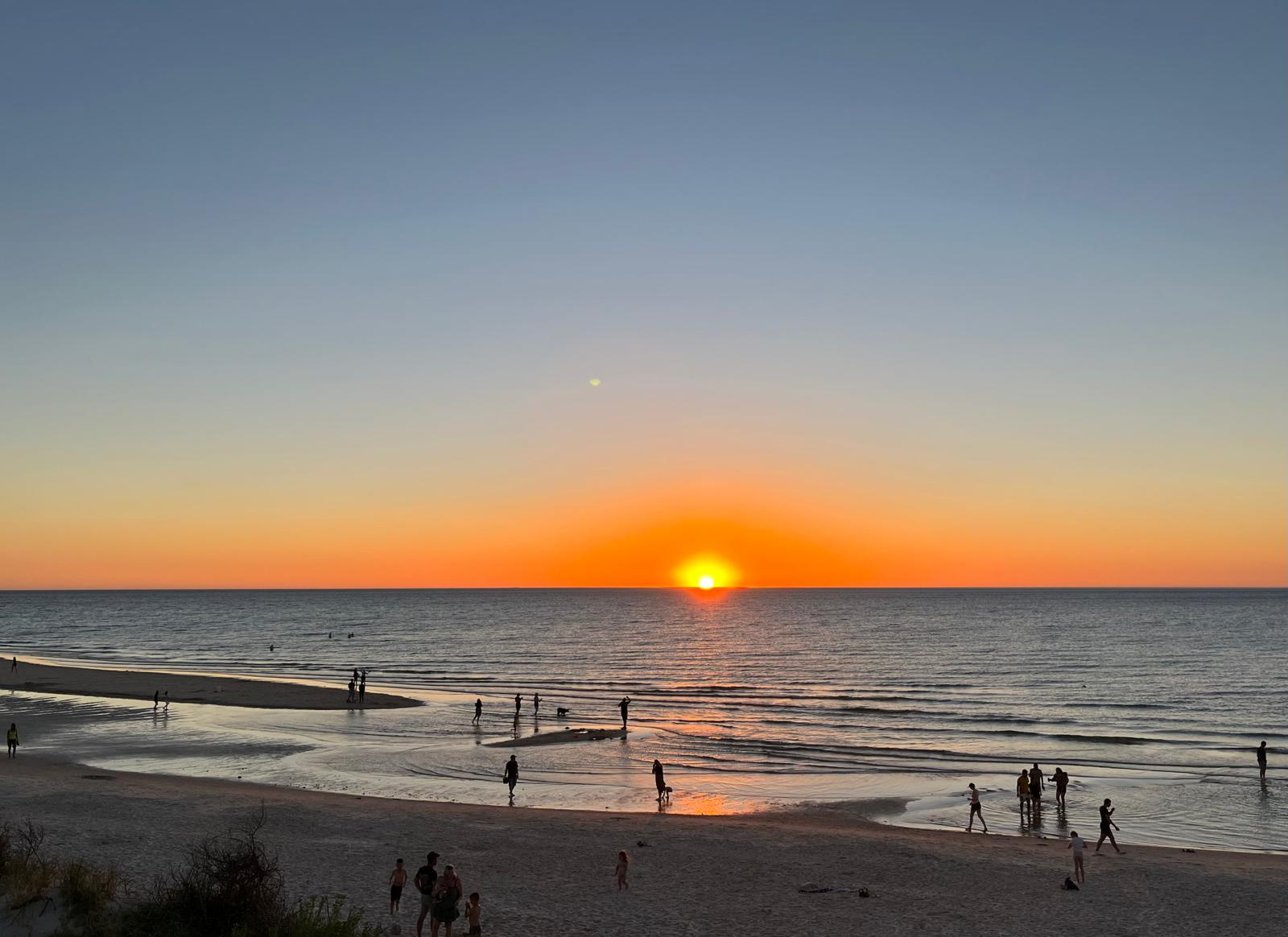
View from Esplanade, Henley Beach South, at sunset

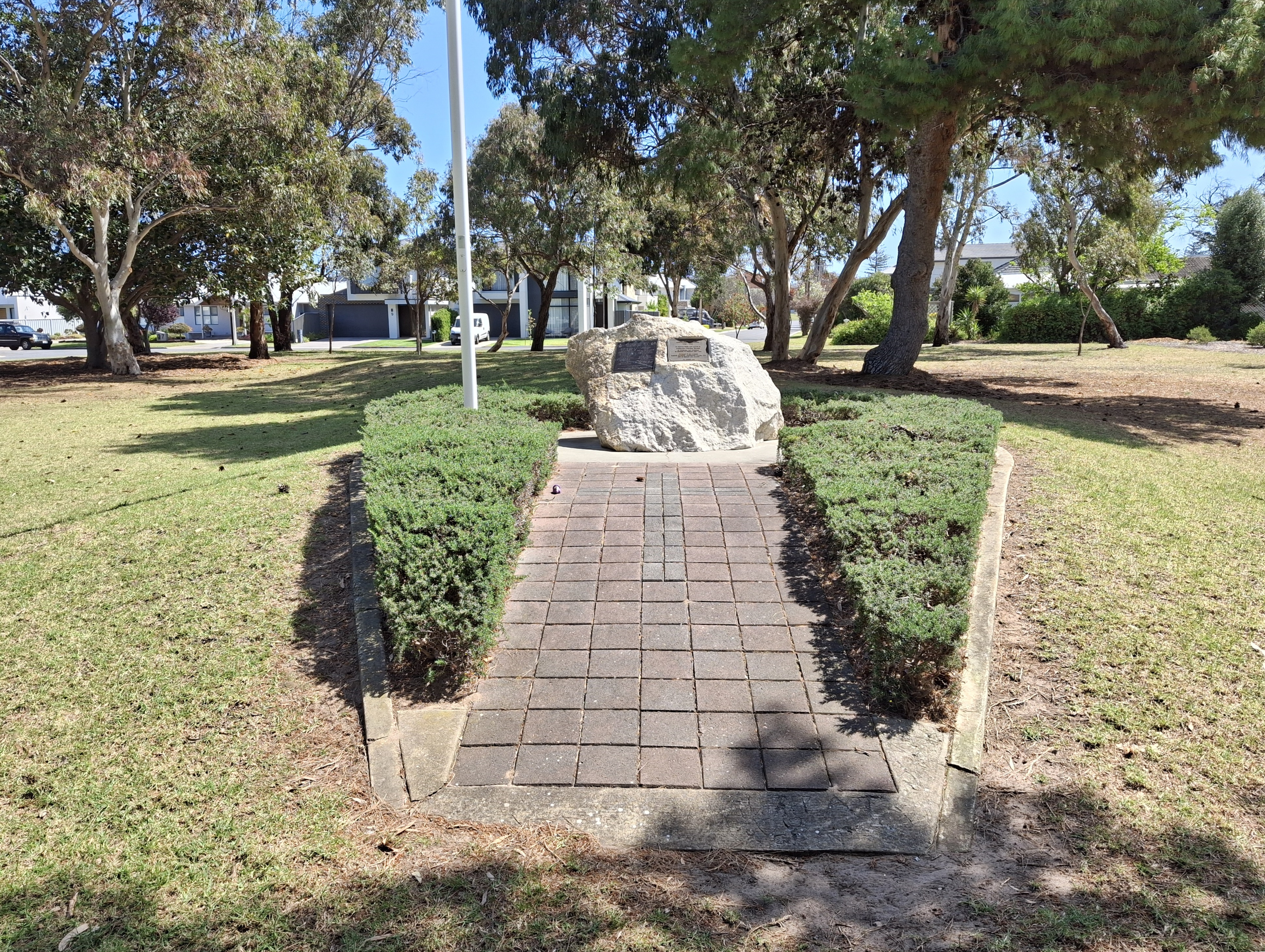
Catalina Flying Boats Memorial, William Atkin Reserve, Henley Beach South

== See also ==
- List of Adelaide suburbs
