= Storm Boy (novel) =

Book by Colin Thiele

- First edition
- Author: Colin Thiele
- Illustrator: John Bailey
- Language: English
- Genre: Children's
- Set in: Coorong region, South Australia
- Publisher: Rigby
- Publication date: 1964
- Publication place: Australia
- Media type: Print
- Pages: 50
- OCLC: 12577321

Storm Boy is a 1964 Australian children's novel written by Colin Thiele, about a boy and his pelican. The story, set in the Coorong region of South Australia, on Ngarrindjeri country, focuses on the relationships the boy has with his father, Hide-Away Tom, one of three pelicans he raised from chicks, and an Australian Aboriginal man called Fingerbone Bill.

The story has been dramatised several times. The 1976 film adaptation Storm Boy won the Jury and Best Film prizes at the 1977 AFI Awards.

== Plot summary ==
Storm Boy likes to wander alone along the fierce deserted coast among the dunes that face out into the Southern Ocean. After a pelican mother is shot, Storm Boy rescues three baby pelicans and nurses them back to health. He names them Mr Proud, Mr Ponder and Mr Percival. After he releases them, his favourite, Mr Percival, returns. The story then concentrates on the conflict between Storm Boy's lifestyle, the externally imposed requirement for him to attend a school, the fate of the pelican, and the relationship of the boy, and later his father, with Fingerbone Bill.

== Adaptations ==
The 1976 film adaptation Storm Boy won both the Jury Prize and Best Film at the 1977 Australian Film Institute Awards. The film starred David Gulpilil in the role of Fingerbone Bill and Greg Rowe in the title role. The film was advertised with the tagline "Every year has its special film, this year it's...Storm Boy".

An audio dramatisation was made in 1994. The Bell Shakespeare Company toured Australia with the play Storm Boy in 1996, with Trent Atkinson in the title role.

The Sydney Theatre Company performed Tom Holloway's stage adaptation in 2013 and 2015 in collaboration with Perth's Barking Gecko Theatre Company, Trevor Jamieson played Fingerbone Bill in the 2013 production, while Jimi Bani played the character in 2015 (apart from three performances, where Shaka Cook stood in owing to an unforeseen family commitment).

A children's video game by the name of Storm Boy: The Game, following the story and including a few mini-games based on its events, was released in late 2018 on several platforms.

A second movie adaptation, starring Geoffrey Rush, Jai Courtney, with Trevor Jamieson reprising his role as Fingerbone Bill, was released in January 2019.
