= Greg Rowe =

Australian actor

- Born: 1965 (age 59–60); Adelaide, South Australia, Australia
- Occupation: Child actor
- Years active: 1976–1982
- Children: 2

Greg Rowe (born 1965 in Adelaide, South Australia) is an Australian former child actor who starred in Australian films such as Storm Boy (1976) and Blue Fin (1978), both based on novels by Colin Thiele. His last film was Freedom (1982), directed by Academy Award nominee Scott Hicks. As of 2016, he lives with his wife and two children in Toronto, Ontario, Canada.

== Filmography ==
Year	Title	Role	Type
1976	Storm Boy	Mike ‘Storm Boy’ Kingley	Feature film
1977	The Last Wave	Carl	Feature film
1978	Blue Fin	Steve ‘Snook’ Pascoe	Feature film
1979	Skyways	Jimmy D’Angelo	TV series
1979	Refugees from Space		Short film
1980	Young Ramsay	Billy Foster	TV series, 1 episode
1980	Dead Man's Float (a.k.a. Smugglers Cove)	Johnny Bell	Feature film
1982	Freedom	Bowser Boy	Feature film
1987	The Time Guardian	Uncredited	Feature film

== Bibliography ==
- Holmstrom, John. The Moving Picture Boy: An International Encyclopaedia from 1895 to 1995. Norwich, Michael Russell, 1996, p. 380-351-352.
