= Storm Boy (1976 film) =

1976 Australian drama film

- Directed by: Henri Safran
- Written by: Sonia Borg; Sidney Stebel
- Based on: Storm Boy by Colin Thiele
- Produced by: Matt Carroll
- Starring: Greg Rowe; Peter Cummins; David Gulpilil
- Cinematography: Geoff Burton
- Edited by: G. Turney-Smith
- Music by: Michael Carlos
- Production company: South Australian Film Corporation
- Release dates: 19 November 1976 (South Australia); 1977 (other states)
- Running time: 88 minutes
- Country: Australia
- Language: English
- Budget: AU$320,000 or $360,000
- Box office: AU$2,645,000 (Australia)

Storm Boy is a 1976 Australian drama film based on the 1964 book of the same name by Colin Thiele, about a lonely boy and his pet pelicans living in a coastal wilderness with his reclusive father. It was the third feature film made by the South Australian Film Corporation, and is a highlight of the New Wave of Australian Cinema from the 1970s. The film was financed by SAFC, Seven Network and the Australian Film Commission.

== Plot ==
Mike (Greg Rowe) is a lonely young boy wandering through the fierce deserted coast of South Australia's Coorong, near the mouth of the Murray River. He and his reclusive father 'Hide Away' Tom (Peter Cummins) live in the isolated sand dunes facing the Southern Ocean. In search of friendship, Mike encounters another recluse in the wilderness, Fingerbone Bill (David Gulpilil), an Aboriginal man estranged from his tribal people. Fingerbone names Mike "Storm Boy" and enlists the child's help caring for three orphaned pelican chicks.

Eventually, Mike's Dad insists that he release the grown birds back into the wild. However one particular pelican, named 'Mr Percival' by Mike, returns. The bird forms a deep bond with the boy until sadly, Mr Percival is shot by duck hunters. With the wise guidance of Fingerbone Bill, Mike learns of the cycle of life and is eventually sent by his father to attend boarding school for which the people of the nearby village raised the money.

== Cast ==
- Greg Rowe as Storm Boy
- Peter Cummins as Hideaway Tom
- David Gulpilil (credited as Gulpilil) as Fingerbone Bill
- Judy Dick as Miss Walker
- Tony Allison as Ranger
- Michael Moody as Boat Master
- Graham Dow as Edwards
- Eric Mack as Jones
- Frank Foster-Brown as Lynch
- Michael Caulfield as Hunter 1
- Graeme Duke as Hunter 2
- Gringo the pelican as Mr Percival
- Paul Smith
- Hedley Cullen
- Jim Harding

== Production ==
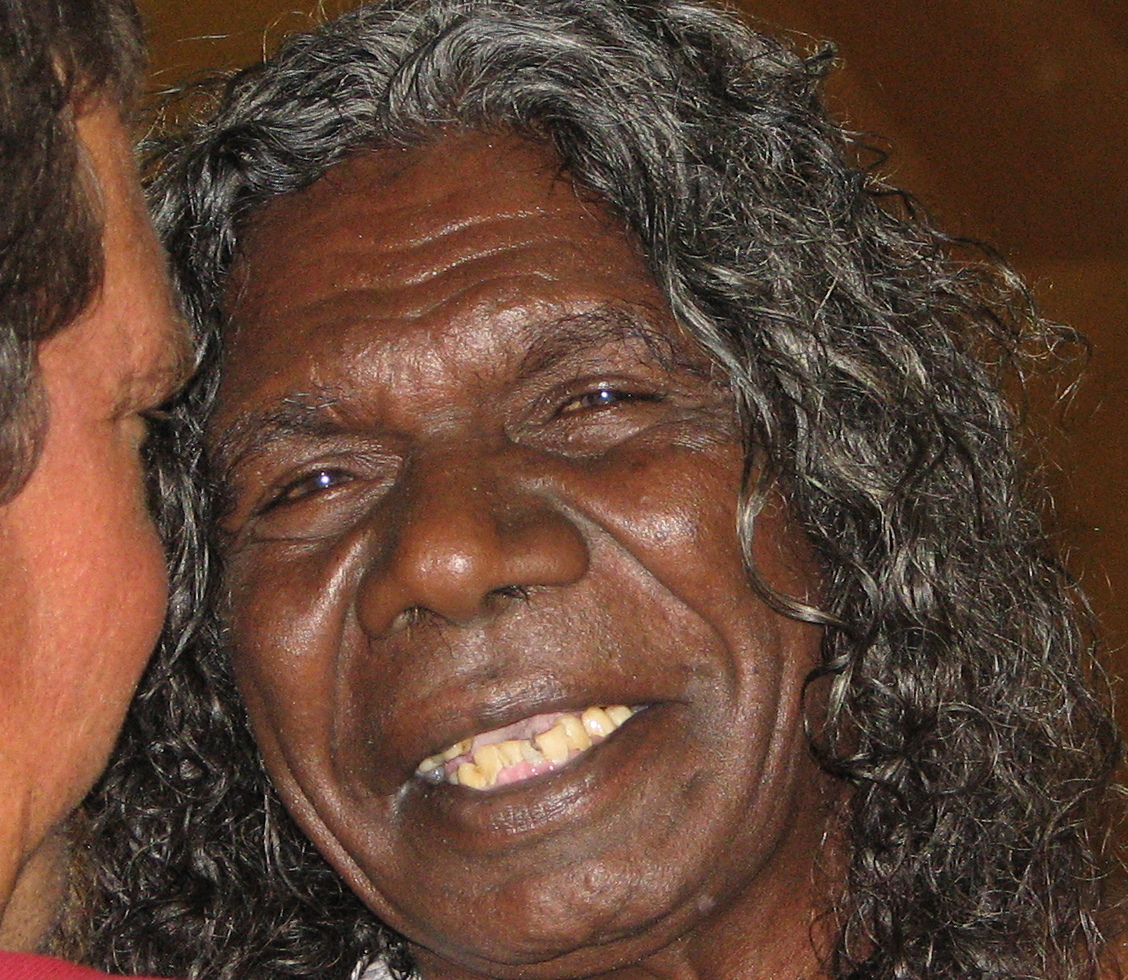
David Gulpilil

Colin Thiele had little involvement in the scripting of the film. His only requirement was that his novel was not turned into a sex comedy. The budget came from the South Australian Film Corporation, the Australian Film Commission and the Seven television network.

Shooting began in May 1976, with exteriors shot near Goolwa and interiors in the SAFC's studio at Norwood. Eleven-year-old Greg Rowe was an untrained actor, selected from over 70 applicants. Three pelicans played the lead pelican. In 2009 Mr Percival died at Royal Adelaide Zoo, aged 33 years old.

The production team later reunited on Blue Fin (1978).

== Reception ==
Storm Boy was a hit, grossing $2,645,000 at the box office in Australia, which is equivalent to $13,674,650 in 2009 dollars.

=== Awards ===
It was a popular children's film both in Australia and Britain and won a medal at the Moscow Film Festival in 1977 for best children's film.

Award	Category	Subject	Result
AACTA Awards (1977 AFI Awards)	Best Film	Matt Carroll	Won
AACTA Awards (1977 AFI Awards)	Best Direction	Henri Safran	Nominated
AACTA Awards (1977 AFI Awards)	Best Screenplay, Original or Adapted	Sonia Borg	Nominated
AACTA Awards (1977 AFI Awards)	Best Screenplay, Original or Adapted	Sidney Stebel	Nominated
AACTA Awards (1977 AFI Awards)	Best Actor	David Gulpilil	Nominated
AACTA Awards (1977 AFI Awards)	Best Sound	Bob Cogger	Nominated
AACTA Awards (1977 AFI Awards)	Best Production Design	David Copping	Nominated
AACTA Awards (1977 AFI Awards)	Best Costume Design	Helen Evans	Nominated
Best Original Music Score	Michael Carlos	Nominated	
ACS Award	Cinematographer of the Year	Geoff Burton	Won
AWGIE Award	Best Writing in a Feature Film - Adapted	Sonia Borg	Won
AWGIE Award	Best Writing in a Feature Film - Adapted	Sidney Stebel	Won

== Remake ==
In 2016, the 40th anniversary of the original film adaptation, Screen Australia announced support for a remake of the 1976 film. Australia's National Film and Sound Archive also placed on limited releasing a digital re-mastering of the original 1976 film, for use at film festivals.

The new Storm Boy film, produced by Michael Boughen and Matthew Street, has a screenplay written by Justin Monjo and is directed by Shawn Seet. The cast includes Geoffrey Rush, Finn Little, Jai Courtney and Erik Thomson.

== See also ==
- Cinema of Australia
- South Australian Film Corporation
- Mr Percival
