= Gepps Cross, South Australia =

Gepps Cross
- Suburb
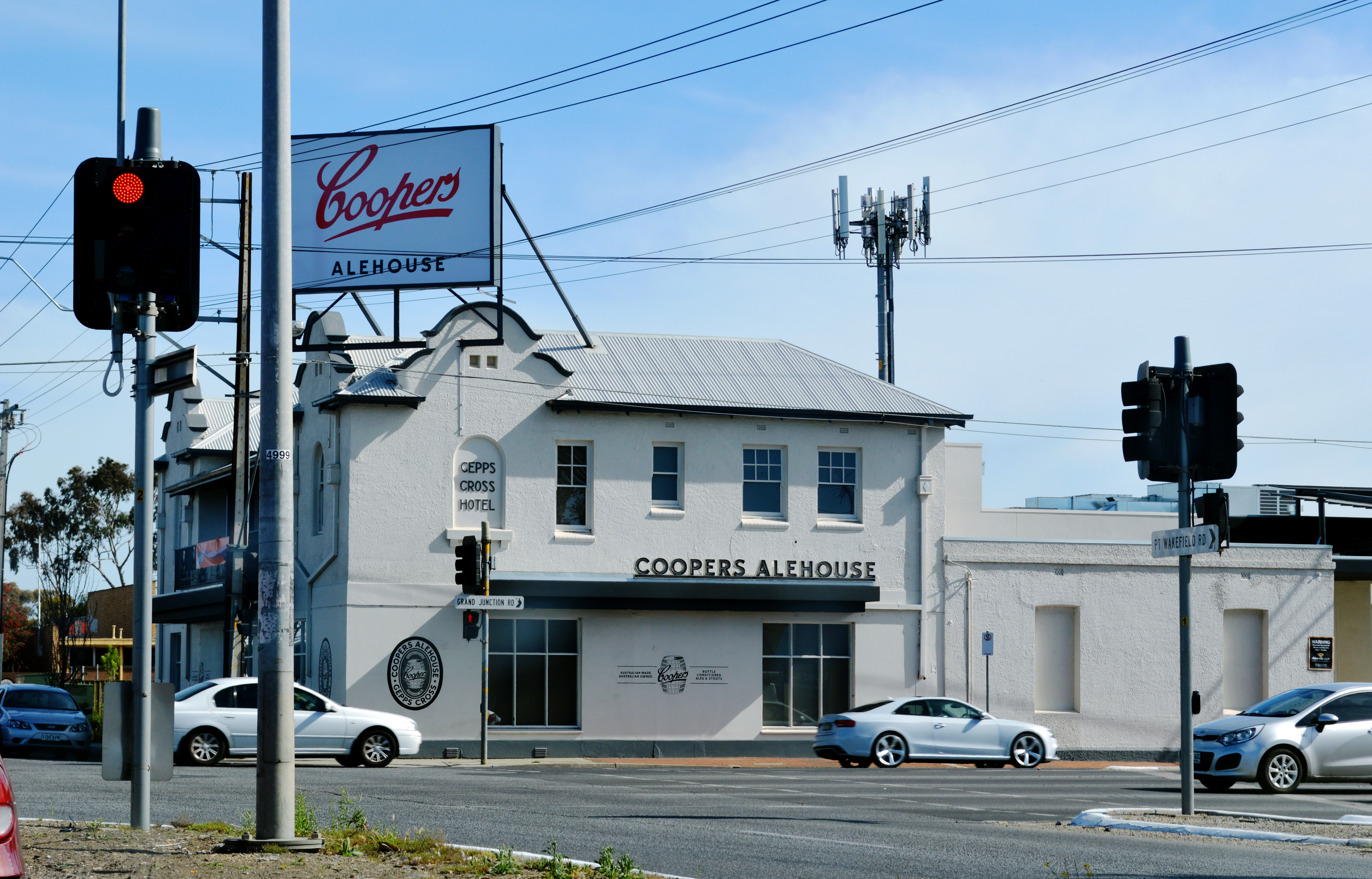
- Gepps Cross Intersection with the historic Gepp's Cross Inn (currently Coopers Alehouse).

- Coordinates: 34°50′28″S 138°36′14″E
- Country: Australia
- State: South Australia
- City: Adelaide
- LGA: City of Port Adelaide Enfield

Government
  - State electorate: Port Adelaide
  - Federal division: Makin

Population
  - Total: 648 (SAL 2021)
- Postcode: 5094
Suburbs around Gepps Cross
Cavan	Pooraka	Walkley Heights
Dry Creek	Gepps Cross	Northfield
Kilburn	Blair Athol, Enfield	Clearview

Gepps Cross (/dʒɛps/ JEPS) is a suburb and major road intersection in the north of Adelaide, South Australia. Gepps Cross is traditionally seen as the end of the inner suburbs and the start of the outer northern suburbs, as it was home to a major abattoir (now closed and demolished) with holding yards and other open space. It is the first significant open space encountered after the North Parklands. It retains the open nature, even with warehouses, a velodrome, hockey stadium, Adelaide Raiders – a Croatian soccer club, and karate training facilities.

== History ==
Gepps Cross was named for Isaac Gepp who arrived in South Australia in July 1840 with his wife Ann and son aboard Fairlie. He opened the Gepp's Cross Inn on the southwest corner of the busy intersection of Main North Road and Grand Junction Road in 1848. The earliest known record of Gepp's Cross being apparently accepted into colloquial speech as a location name without reference to the inn, was in April 1849, one year after Isaac Gepp named his 'Gepp's Cross' Inn. In a court case Dr Mayo in evidence referred to the mill at Gepp's Cross and John Harris gave his address as Gepp's Cross. In the same month William Raines, a butcher, baker and storekeeper, advertised he would supply customers at their residences at Gepp's Cross. After the names Blair Athol and Enfield were assumed, respectively, for the land on the southwest and southeast of the intersection, the placename Gepps Cross became more heavily associated with land to the north, where the present-day suburb is bounded.

=== Gepps Cross Inn ===
In March 1848, Isaac Gepp opened an inn on the north eastern corner of land Section 360 bordered to the north and east by Grand Junction Road and Main North Road. Isaac Gepp, with his wife Ann and a child, had arrived in the province on the Fairlie in July 1840. The child passenger was probably his nephew Henry Francis Gepp (1836–1871), the natural born son of Thomas Gepp (c. 1809–1894) and Ann Francis (1816–1868). Gepp first worked as a water carrier and in 1845 he became the publican of the Windmill Inn on Great North Road near Adelaide.

In May 1846, Gepp gave notice of his application to license a new public house called the Miller's Friend on land being Part Section 360 he had acquired from William Webber the previous year. The name Miller's Friend may be linked to the Ragless flour mill on land, Part Section 97, immediately north east of the junction and Gepp's new premises. Section 360 was originally occupied by James Pitcher about 1842 and he named the land Section Bushy Farm. About the time Pitcher sold the north eastern corner to Webber, John Merritt, a farmer and copper carrier for the Burra Burra mine, acquired the southern forty acres of Section 360 with a cottage and used it as a residence, to farm and to keep his working bullocks.

At the time of his licence application for the Miller's Friend, Gepp had contracted to sell his interest in the Windmill Inn to Robert Carter, the licence for which was transferred from Gepp to Carter in June 1846. Carter failed to stop Gepp's original application for the new licensed premises on Section 360; he claimed Gepp had contracted with him not to hold another licence in the neighbourhood. In March 1847 Gepp's publican's licence was renewed under the new name of the Miner's Arms. Before the licensing bench on 13 March 1848, Isaac Gepp nominated his premises to be the 'Gepp's Cross' Inn. Gepp leased his inn to Joseph Ladd in 1849 who continued to call it the Gepp's Cross Inn.

Charles Mathews owned 13 acres of land, Part of Section 337, across the Main North Road from the Gepp's Cross Inn, on the south eastern corner of Gepp's Cross intersection, where he operated a blacksmith shop. In December 1848, Mathews applied for a publican's licence for the 'Blacksmiths Arms Hotel' on his premises, but Isaac Gepp objected on the grounds that two hotels being placed exactly opposite each other would probably cause the road to be obstructed by drays. The bench ruled that competition for custom would induce a disregard for order or public convenience and the application of Charles Mathews was refused. John Merritt who farmed next to the Gepp's Cross Inn and across the road from Mathew's blacksmith shop took out an option to purchase Mathews' 13-acre property. Merritt relinquished this option after he became publican of the Grand Junction Inn in 1851. In 1850, Isaac Gepp transferred his licence and lease of the Gepp's Cross Inn on land Section 360 to Charles Mathews. In 1851 Mathews dropped the former licensee's name from the inn name and changed it to the Victoria Cross. It obviously didn't sit well with the patrons who by then referred to the area around the inn as Gepp's Cross and in all likelihood continued to call the inn by its colloquial name. Mathews reverted to the accepted name in 1852. Gepp sold his Part Section 360 to Charles Mathews in November 1854 for the sum of £900, with repayment set out in the terms of a mortgage and two lease payments of £50 per year each for inn and surrounding land until the purchase was complete. Months before he purchased the Gepp's Cross Inn and land Part Section 360 Charles Mathews had let the inn run down. In March 1854, he was cautioned to keep his house in a proper state of cleanliness. By the end of 1858, Matthews was in financial difficulty and he sold one acre of his Part Section 360 bordering John Merritt's farm to the council, which wanted the land to erect a civic hall and stray animal pound. Once built the hall was used as a council office and school until 1899 when it was used as a dwelling.

In December 1859, Mathews transferred his licensed business across the Main North Road from land Section 360 to the premises on land Section 337 that in 1848, he had tried to open as the Blacksmith's Arms Hotel. Trade at the Gepp's Cross Inn on land Section 337 was poor and in April 1861, Charles Mathews was certified insolvent. Mathews defaulted in his mortgage and lease payments to Isaac Gepp who seized the Inn and land on Section 360 and Mathews' premises on Section 337 that had been put up as collateral. Between 13 June 1861 and the first week in October 1861, there was no premises licensed at Gepp's Cross. The Gepp's Cross Hotel licence was reinstated to premises on Section 360 when Patrick Connaughty was granted a publican's licence for the inn who transferred it to George Eldridge in December 1861. The premises known primarily as the Gepp's Cross Inn or Gepps Cross Hotel has been licensed at the site continuously for over 150 years.

== Facilities ==
There are multiple shopping centres with home furnishings and retail stores all grouped in the same vicinity near the intersection of Main North Road and Matthews Road.

=== Drive-in-theatre ===
A drive-in movie theatre, the Mainline Drive-In, situated between Port Wakefield and Main North roads less than a kilometre north of the Gepps Cross intersection, was opened on 7 October 1955, as "Australia's first drive-in walk-in theatre". It originally had a capacity for 500 cars with patrons viewing while seated inside, and additional parking for 500 cars, with seating for 400 people. When it opened, it was a subject of debate in parliament, with speakers concerned about the effect on the morals of young people. It has been operated by Wallis Cinemas. In November 2021, the family business announced the closure of the drive-in at the end of February 2022, owing to various factors which have affected its viability over the years, including "the changing nature of the cinema industry, the introduction of daylight saving, film piracy and now the lengthy COVID-19 epidemic".

The Gepps Cross Treasure Market, held at the site of the drive-in each Sunday morning, will continue to operate after the drive-in is closed.

== Transport ==
Until 1995, the Northfield railway line which ran along the suburb's northern boundary to Yatala Prison and the abattoirs crossed Port Wakefield Road. The line further east crossing Main North Road had been previously shortened in 1961 and fully closed in 1987.

Gepps Cross is best known for the five-way intersection with Grand Junction Road going east and west, Main North Road south and north-east, and Port Wakefield Road going north. The intersection is not grade-separated. It is controlled by traffic lights, and all five roads have at least three lanes in each direction. These roads include the main highways from Adelaide to Western Australia and the Northern Territory (via Port Wakefield Road), New South Wales (via Main North Road), the northern suburbs of Adelaide and the northern parts of South Australia (both roads). Port Adelaide is to the west, and the major freight hubs are northwest of Gepps Cross. A major route from Port Adelaide towards Victoria and the south and east of South Australia is east along Grand Junction Road then south along Portrush Road to the South Eastern Freeway. It was a holding place for people that came from England in 1952; from there they went interstate to find new homes.

== Sport ==
Gepps Cross is home to local association football side Adelaide Raiders, participating in the South Australian National Premier Leagues for the 2014 season, as well as the North Adelaide Lacrosse Club, which is the oldest lacrosse club in South Australia and second oldest lacrosse club in Australia. Gepps Cross also has the ServiceFM Stadium, a soccer facility, used by multiple National Premier League teams, and for multiple extracurricular activities by Roma Mitchell Secondary College, who is located next to the facility

The suburb is also the location of the State Sports Park, which incorporates the State Hockey Centre, also known as The Pines, and cycling velodrome Adelaide Super-Drome, the latter of which is currently used as the base and main venue for the South Australian Futsal League (SAFL) from 2013 onwards.

Gepps Cross Futsal Club also takes its name from the suburb, and competes in the aforementioned South Australian Futsal League, starting in March 2014.
