= Stockade (disambiguation) =

A stockade is an architectural element.

Stockade may also refer to:

- a military prison, especially on an army or air force installation
- The Stockade, or The Stockade of Dry Creek, original name of Yatala Labour Prison in South Australia
- Stockade (software), net filtering software
- Stockade Hill, Howick, near Auckland
- Stockade Historic District in Schenectady, New York
- Stockade railway station or Stockade Botanical Park, in Adelaide
- Stockade (film), a 1971 Australian musical film
