= Grand Junction Road =

Road in Adelaide, South Australia

Grand Junction Road South Australia
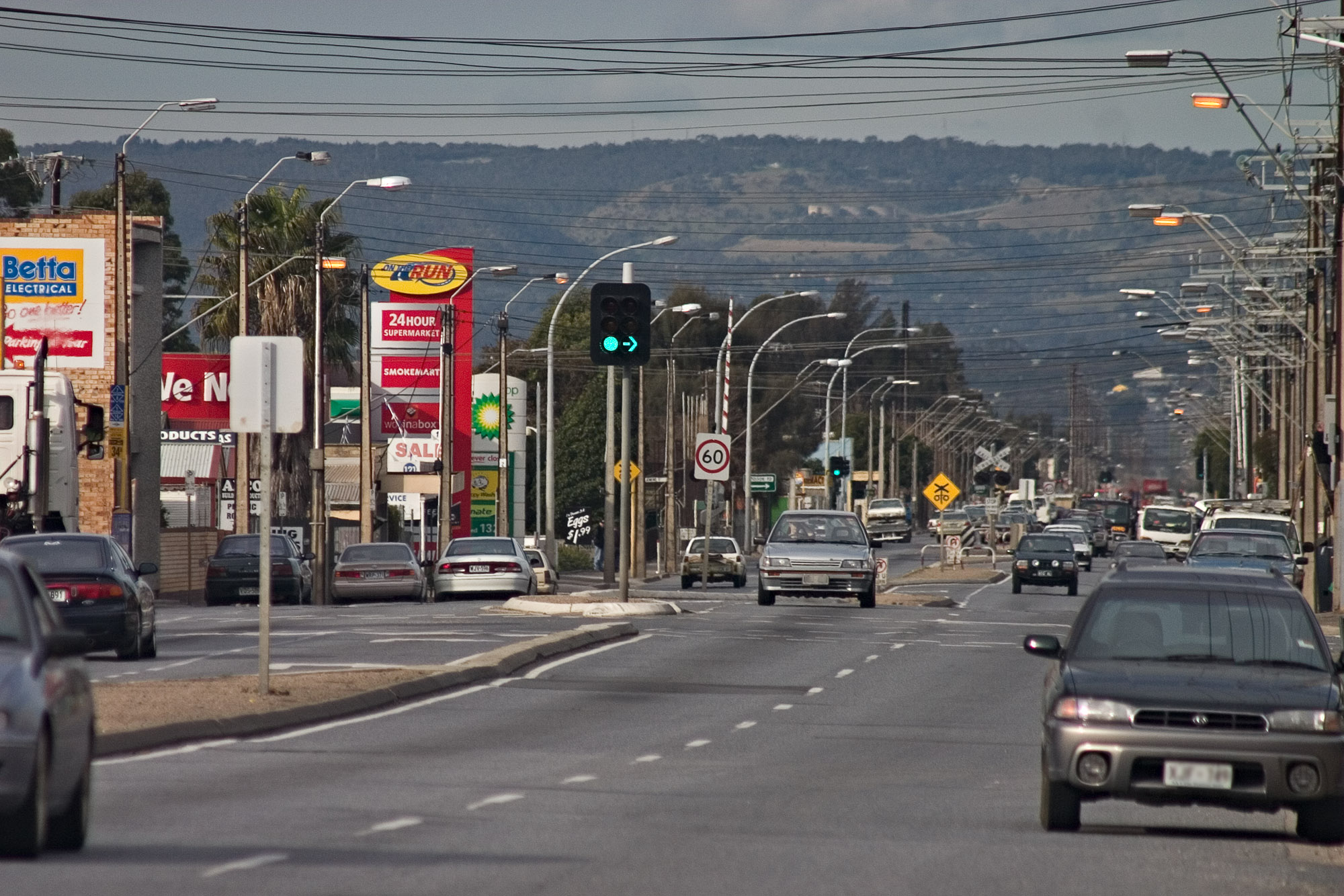
- View of the Adelaide Hills from Grand Junction Road
- Coordinates: 34.852502°S 138.502200°E (West end); 34.839618°S 138.720242°E (East end)

General information
- Type: Road
- Location: Adelaide
- Length: 20.0 km (12 mi)
- Route number(s): A16 (1998–present)
- Former route number: National Highway A16 (1998–2017) (Wingfield–Northfield)

Major junctions
- West end: Bower Road; Port Adelaide, Adelaide
- Port Road; North–South Motorway; Port Wakefield Road; Main North Road; Hampstead Road; North East Road; Hancock Road
- East end: Lower North East Road; Hope Valley, Adelaide

Location(s)
- Region: Western Adelaide, Northern Adelaide
- Major suburbs: Port Adelaide, Regency Park, Gepps Cross, Northfield, Holden Hill

Grand Junction Road is the longest east–west thoroughfare in the Adelaide metropolitan area, traversing through Adelaide's northern suburbs approximately 8 kilometres north of the Adelaide city centre.

== Route ==
Travelling from the Port Adelaide region, it is mostly a double-lane sealed road (triple-laned between South Road and Cavan Road/Churchill Road and between Main North Road/Port Wakefield Road and Hampstead Road/Briens Road) (becoming a single-lane road past Tolley Road intersection at Hope Valley, South Australia) running 21 kilometres to the base of the Adelaide Hills. The western end at the intersection of Old Port Road, 300 metres east of a causeway which separates the Port River from West Lakes. The 2.4 kilometre section of road that continues west of Old Port Road to Semaphore South is named Bower Road. The eastern end of Grand Junction Road is in the suburb of Hope Valley, at the intersection of Hancock Road and Lower North East Road, just before the latter proceeds into the Adelaide Hills, past Anstey Hill Recreation Park and on towards the towns of Houghton and Inglewood.

== History ==
The Grand Junction, located at today's intersection of Grand Junction Road and Churchill Road, is the meeting point of what was once the most accessible route out of Adelaide City to the north (over the Torrens via Port Road). It was the intersection of North Road, later called Lower North Road (today Cavan Road), and the east–west road from Upper Dry Creek to the Port (today's Grand Junction Road from Walkley's Road to Cavan Road). It remained so until January 1843, when migrant labourers completed a new bridge spanning 120 feet over the Torrens River. This enabled travellers to take the more direct route northward on the road from the city to Gawler Town (later called Great North Road, today Main North Road), and the junction of roads at Gepps Cross took on a greater significance than the Grand Junction.

In the mid-1850s, the track and road from the upper Dry Creek, past the Grand Junction Inn, to the Port, was variously called ‘road to the Port’, ‘Port Road,’ or ‘Grand Junction' to (Port) 'Causeway Road’. In November 1854 the Legislative Council requested the Central Road Board estimate the cost of a continuous road from the Grand Junction to the "Port-road near Albert Town", rendered necessary by the formation of the Adelaide and Port Railway. The road upgrade was shelved though for two years. In 1856 the Central Road Board resolved to upgrade the poor roadway between the Grand Junction Inn and Albert Town through the Alberton Swamp. The matter was a serious concern for many district councils north of Adelaide and, in a united front, the district councils flooded the Legislative Council with petitions. On 9 May the Legislative Council passed a motion "for £2,500 to be placed on the Estimates, to form the road from the Grand Junction to Alberton." Official reference to ‘Grand Junction Road’ was made by the government in a message (No. 42) received from the Governor-in-Chief which appropriate funds for the road to the Central Road Board in 1856.

Progress on the road was slow, and it was not until May 1857 that approval was given to metal (pave) the new road with compacted limestone. The woes of the road dragged on. Tenderers defaulted and further works were ordered, including an additional 1,000 cubic yards of limestone on the swamp that still was not laid by the end of 1858. The road between the Grand Junction Inn and Alberton across the swamp turned into a money pit for the road board and the community. The saga continued for years. In July 1861 the Central Road Board yet again called for tenders to make 19 chains of the Grand Junction Road over sands at Alberton Swamp. Popular usage of the name "Grand Junction Road" greatly increased after the upgrade was completed in the early 1860s.

== Major intersections ==
There are a number of major intersections along Grand Junction Road, the largest being at Gepps Cross, where Main North Road and Port Wakefield Road meet at a five-way crossing. Main North Road joins from the south and continues on to the north-east, towards Parafield, Elizabeth and Gawler, while Port Wakefield Road begins at this location, travelling due north to the northern Adelaide Plains and 90 kilometres to the town of Port Wakefield. The original Grand Junction at the intersection with Churchill and Cavan Roads was once a five-way intersection used by most northbound travel out of Adelaide. Another intersection was added in 2011, the Gallipoli Drive.

LGA	Location	km	mi	Destinations	Notes
Port Adelaide Enfield	Port Adelaide–West Lakes boundary	0.0	0.0	Bower Road – Semaphore South	Western terminus of road, route A16 continues west along Bower Road
Port Adelaide Enfield	Port Adelaide–West Lakes boundary	0.0	0.0	Old Port Road – Port Adelaide, Queenstown	
Port Adelaide Enfield	Port Adelaide–Alberton boundary	0.7	0.43	Commercial Road (A7 north) – Port Adelaide; Port Road (A7 south) – Woodville, Hindmarsh, Adelaide	
Port Adelaide Enfield	Port Adelaide–Alberton–Rosewater tripoint	1.1	0.68	Outer Harbor railway line	
Port Adelaide Enfield	Rosewater	2.2	1.4	Dry Creek-Port Adelaide railway line	
Port Adelaide Enfield–Charles Sturt boundary	Wingfield–Mansfield Park–Athol Park–Ottoway quadripoint	4.1	2.5	Hanson Road – Wingfield, Kilkenny	
Port Adelaide Enfield	Wingfield–Regency Park–Angle Park tripoint	5.7	3.5	South Road, to North–South Motorway – Waterloo Corner, Wingfield, Hindmarsh	
Port Adelaide Enfield	Wingfield–Regency Park–Dry Creek–Kilburn quadripoint	7.1	4.4	Gawler and Adelaide–Port Augusta SG railway lines	
Port Adelaide Enfield	Dry Creek–Kilburn–Gepps Cross tripoint	7.3	4.5	Cavan Road (A22 north), to Churchill Road North – Cavan; Churchill Road (A22 south) – Kilburn, Prospect, Ovingham	
Port Adelaide Enfield	Gepps Cross–Enfield–Blair Athol tripoint	9.0	5.6	Port Wakefield Road (A1 north) – Waterloo Corner, Two Wells, Port Wakefield; Main North Road (A1 south) – Blair Athol, Prospect, North Adelaide; Main North Road (A20 northeast) – Pooraka, Elizabeth, Gawler	
Port Adelaide Enfield	Gepps Cross–Northfield–Clearview tripoint	10.5	6.5	Briens Road (north) – Para Hills, Salisbury East; Hampstead Road (A17 south) – Manningham, Marden, Norwood, Glen Osmond	
Tea Tree Gully	Holden Hill–Modbury–Gilles Plains–Valley View quadripoint	15.4	9.6	North East Road (A10) – Medindie, Hampstead Gardens, Houghton, Birdwood	
Tea Tree Gully	Holden Hill–Modbury–Hope Valley tripoint	16.0	9.9	O-Bahn Busway	
Tea Tree Gully	Vista–Hope Valley boundary	20.0	12.4	Hancock Road (A11 north) – Golden Grove, Salisbury Park	
Tea Tree Gully	Vista–Hope Valley boundary	20.0	12.4	Lower North East Road (A11 south, A16 east) – Houghton, Campbelltown, Kent Town	Eastern terminus of road, route A16 continues east along Lower North East Road
Route transition

== Railway crossings ==
Due to the configuration of the Adelaide railway system north of the Adelaide city centre, there are a number of current and former railway crossings over Grand Junction Road. These include:

- The bridge over the Adelaide to Outer Harbor railway line at Alberton
- A disused level crossing over the Dry Creek–Port Adelaide railway line, at Rosewater
- A dismantled level crossing in the proximity of Glenroy Street and Eastern Parade, at Pennington and Ottoway (On the former Finsbury railway line)
- The bridge over the Adelaide to Gawler and Adelaide-Port Augusta railway at Kilburn and Wingfield
- The Adelaide O-Bahn underpass at Holden Hill (Dedicated Busway)

== Educational institutions ==
=== Adjoining institutions ===
A number of schools and other education institutions front onto Grand Junction Road. These include:

- St Paul's College, Gilles Plains
- Tauondi College at Port Adelaide, opposite Alberton
- Torrens Valley Christian School at Hope Valley

== Other landmarks ==
Grand Junction Road also passes Yatala Labour Prison, the Adelaide Pre-Release Centre and the Adelaide Women's Prison at Northfield.

== Gallery ==
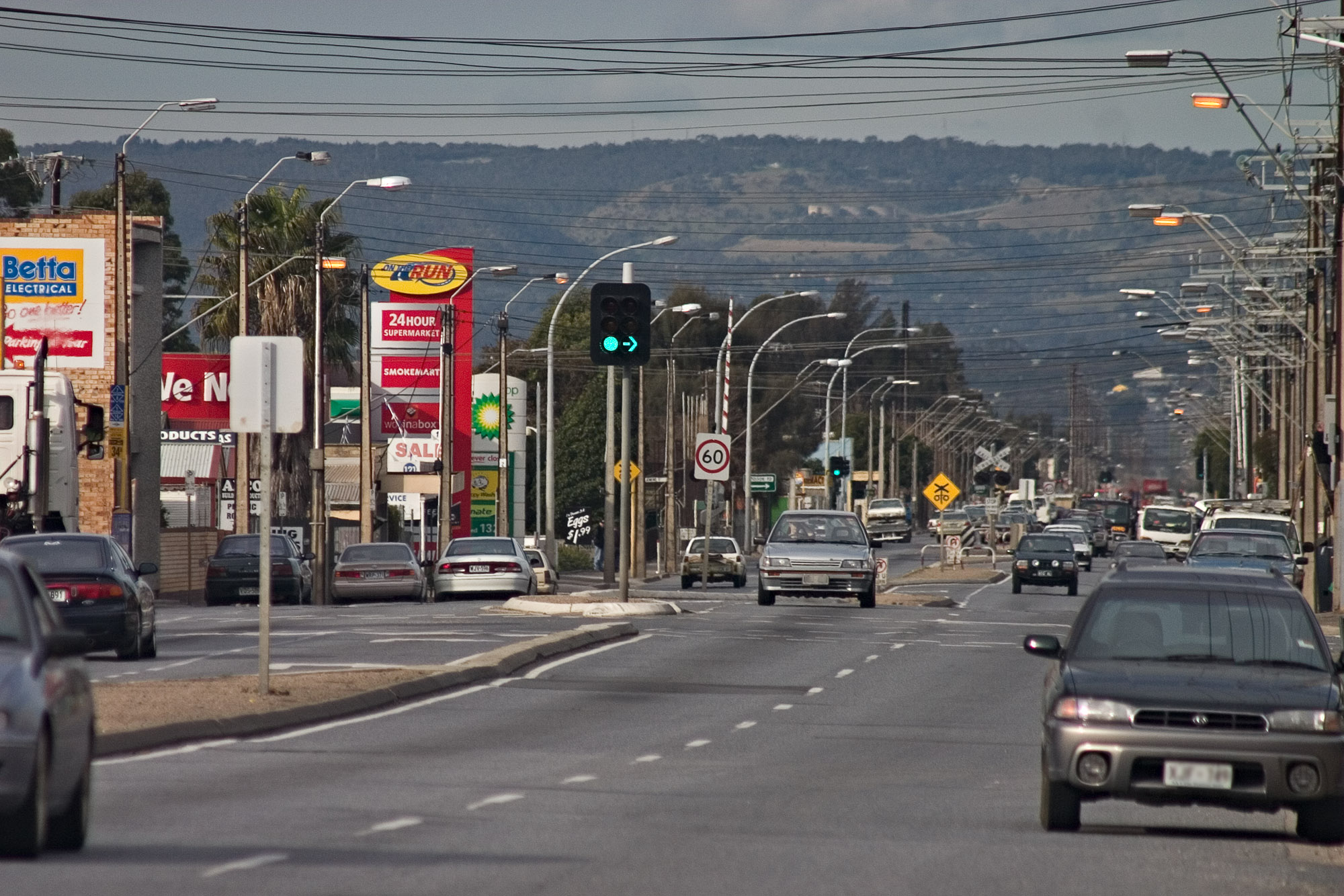
Looking down Grand Junction Road towards the Adelaide Hills from Rosewater.

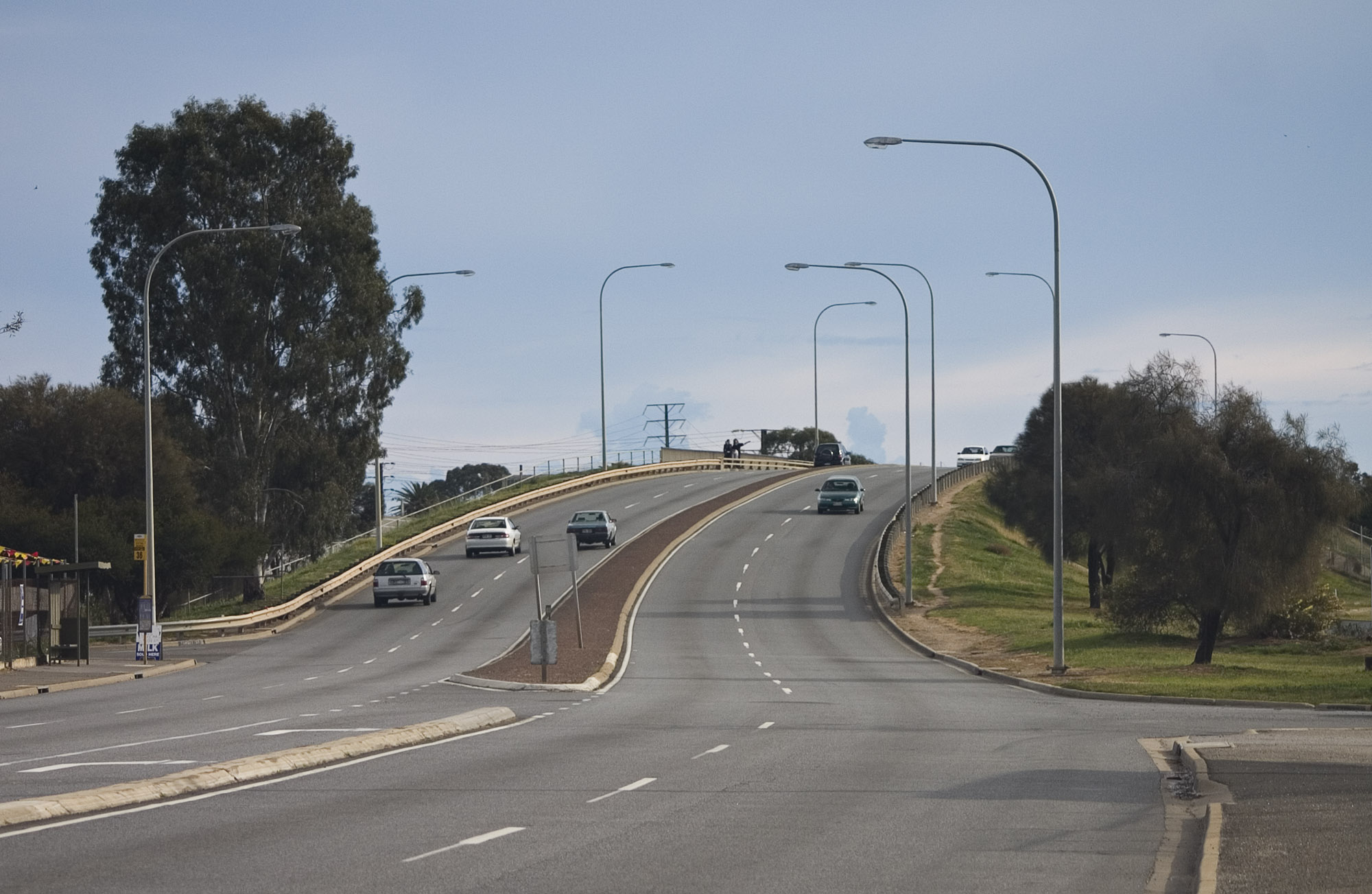
The bridge over the Adelaide to Port Adelaide railway line at Alberton.

Location of Grand Junction Road in the Adelaide Metropolitan area.
