= Cavan railway station, Adelaide =

Former railway station in South Australia, Australia

Coordinates: 34°50′02″S 138°35′59″E

Cavan

General information
- Location: Port Wakefield Road and Goldsborough Road; Cavan
- Line: Northfield railway line
- Distance: 12.1 km from Adelaide
- Platforms: 1

Construction
- Structure type: demolished

History
- Opened: 1914
- Closed: 29 May 1987

Services
Preceding station	TransAdelaide	Following station
Dry Creek towards Adelaide	Northfield line	Pooraka towards Northfield
Location

Cavan railway station was located 12.1 kilometres (7.5 mi) by rail from Adelaide on the now closed Northfield branch line. Its elevation was 13 metres (43 ft) above sea level.

== History ==
The Stockade line (later known as the Northfield railway line), running from Dry Creek through to Stockade railway station, was first opened in 1857. Cavan station was probably opened along this line in 1914, and was located at the corner of Port Wakefield Road and Goldsborough Road. The station was named after the suburb of Cavan, a namesake of a local hotel first licensed in 1855, which itself was named after Cavan in County Cavan, Ireland.

Cavan station was closed to commuter traffic on 29 May 1987, but some cattle trains still used the stock ramp sidings near Cavan and Pooraka stations until the mid-1990s.
