= Port Wakefield Highway =

Highway in South Australia

Port Wakefield Highway Port Wakefield Road South Australia
- Coordinates: 34.162656°S 138.156639°E (North end); 34.848097°S 138.600178°E (South end)

General information
- Type: Highway
- Length: 89.7 km (56 mi)
- Route number(s): A1 (2017–present)
- Former route number: National Highway A1 (1998–2017); National Highway 1 (1974–1998); National Route 1 (1955–1974)

Major junctions
- North end: Augusta Highway; Port Wakefield, South Australia
- Copper Coast Highway; Balaklava Road; Mallala Road; North–South Motorway; Northern Expressway; Salisbury Highway; Grand Junction Road
- South end: Main North Road; Gepps Cross, Adelaide

Location(s)
- Region: Yorke and Mid North, Barossa Light and Lower North, Northern Adelaide
- Major settlements: Two Wells, Virginia, Cavan, Gepps Cross

Highway system
- Highways in Australia; National Highway • Freeways in Australia; Highways in South Australia

Port Wakefield Highway (and its southern section as Port Wakefield Road) is an important South Australian highway, connecting Adelaide to the Yorke Peninsula, Port Augusta, northern and western South Australia, the Northern Territory and Western Australia. It is designated National Highway A1 and a part of the National Highway. It is named after Port Wakefield, the first government town north of Adelaide.

== Route ==
Port Wakefield Highway begins at the intersection of Augusta and Copper Coast Highways just north of Port Wakefield, and runs as a four-lane, dual-lane carriageway south to the interchange with the North–South Motorway and Northern Expressway; it changes name to Port Wakefield Road and continues south into Adelaide as a four-lane, dual-carriage road, widening to six lanes at Ryans Road in Parafield Gardens, narrowing back to four lanes at Cavan Road in Gepps Cross, and then ends at Main North Road a short distance later. The route is dual-carriageway for its entire length to Port Wakefield and bypasses all of the small towns along its former route.

== History ==
The four-span bridge opened in 1926 over the Gawler railway line at Cavan was replaced with two dual carriageway bridges in 1980. At the same time Virginia and Two Wells were bypassed.

In 2011 an upgrade including road widening of nine kilometres of Port Wakefield Road between Salisbury Highway and Waterloo Corner Road was completed as part of the Northern Expressway project. Historically, the whole route was named Port Wakefield Road, however following the opening of the Northern Expressway, the route from Port Wakefield south to that junction in Waterloo Corner was renamed Port Wakefield Highway.

In February 2020, the northbound ramp from Port Wakefield Road to the Northern Expressway was closed permanently as part of the final stages of opening the Northern Connector, the project name at the time for the northernmost part of the North–South Motorway. Northbound traffic to the Northern Expressway needs to use an earlier entrance to the North–South Motorway or join the Northern Expressway later via Waterloo Corner Road and Heaslip Road.

The original bypass of Port Wakefield has become built up with roadhouses and other businesses, leading to calls to build a new bypass further east; this has evolved into a duplication of the road through Port Wakefield, resulting in wider carriageways and a safer separation of traffic. The contract for detailed design and construction of duplication of the highway through Port Wakefield and a grade-separated intersection with the Copper Coast Highway was let in March 2020 to the Port Wakefield to Port Augusta Alliance (a consortium of CPB Contractors, Aurecon and GHD Group, also responsible for the duplication of Joy Baluch AM Bridge in Port Augusta), with the government announcing an overpass for the intersection with Copper Coast Highway in 2021. Project construction commenced in late 2020, with completion expected in 2022; the overpass to Copper Coast Highway opened in December 2021, four months ahead of schedule.

== Major intersections ==
LGA	Location	km	mi	Destinations	Notes
Wakefield	Port Wakefield	0.0	0.0	Augusta Highway (A1 north) – Snowtown, Port Augusta	Northern terminus of Port Wakefield Highway, route A1 continues north along Augusta Highway
Wakefield	Port Wakefield	0.0	0.0	Copper Coast Highway (B85 west) – Kadina, Wallaroo	
Wakefield	Port Wakefield	2.2	1.4	Balaklava Road (B84 northeast) – Balaklava, Auburn; North Street (west) – Port Wakefield	
Adelaide Plains	Two Wells	59.6	37.0	Mallala Road (B77) – Two Wells, Mallala, to Gawler Road (B77) – Gawler	
Playford	Riverlea Park–Virginia boundary	66.7	41.4	Angle Vale Road – Virginia, Angle Vale, Gawler	
Playford	Virginia–Waterloo Corner boundary	72.0	44.7	Old Port Wakefield Road – Virginia	
Playford	Waterloo Corner	73.5	45.7	Northern Expressway (M2 northeast) – Gawler; North–South Motorway (M2 southwest) – Wingfield, Hindmarsh	Partial interchange: no northbound entrances to Northern Expressway and North–South Motorway; Southern terminus of Port Wakefield Highway, northern terminus of Port Wakefield Road
Salisbury	Waterloo Corner	76.7	47.7	Waterloo Corner Road – Salisbury, St Kilda	
Salisbury	Bolivar–Paralowie boundary	80.3	49.9	Bolivar Road (A18) – Modbury; North–South Motorway (M2 west) – Waterloo Corner, Wingfield	
Salisbury	Dry Creek–Mawson Lakes boundary	85.7	53.3	Salisbury Highway (A9) – Port Adelaide, Salisbury	Diamond interchange
Salisbury	Dry Creek–Mawson Lakes–Cavan tripoint	86.6	53.8	Gawler and Adelaide-Port Augusta SG railway lines	
Salisbury	Cavan	87.4	54.3	Churchill Road North (west) – Dry Creek; Montague Road (east) – Pooraka, Para Vista	
Port Adelaide Enfield	Gepps Cross–Dry Creek boundary	88.5	55.0	Cavan Road (A22) – Dry Creek, Kilburn	
Port Adelaide Enfield	Blair Athol–Enfield–Gepps Cross tripoint	89.7	55.7	Grand Junction Road (A16 west, east) – Port Adelaide, Northfield, Hope Valley; Main North Road (A20 north-east) – Elizabeth, Gawler, Nurioopta	
Port Adelaide Enfield	Blair Athol–Enfield–Gepps Cross tripoint	89.7	55.7	Main North Road (A1 south) – North Adelaide	Southern terminus of Port Wakefield Road, route A1 continues south along Main North Road
1.000 mi = 1.609 km; 1.000 km = 0.621 mi: Incomplete access; Route transition

== Towns ==
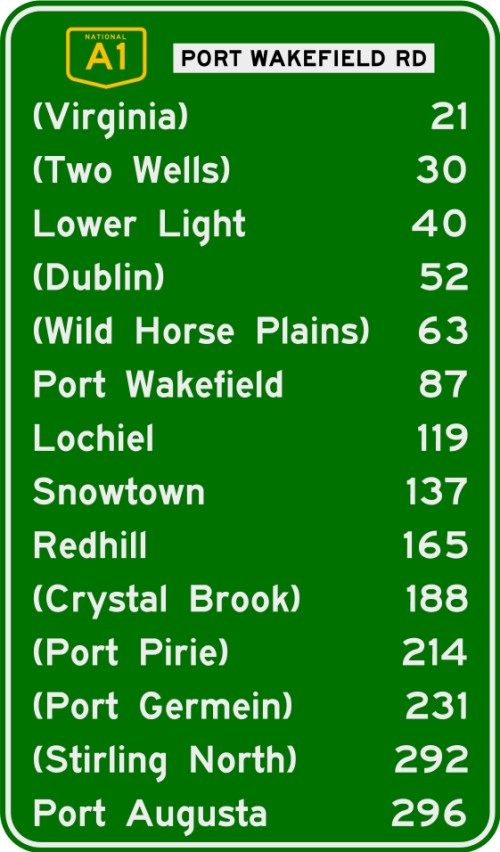
Approximate road distances (in kilometres) of towns along the Port Wakefield Road from Main North Road, Adelaide

Port Wakefield Road passes through the northern Adelaide Plains. To the west of the road is the coastal fringe of upper Gulf St Vincent, including a number of fishing and holiday villages. To the east is rich cropping and farming land.

The list of towns on or near the road include:

- Virginia
- Two Wells
- Lower Light
- Dublin
- Windsor
- Wild Horse Plains
- Inkerman
- Port Wakefield

== See also ==
- Highways in Australia
- List of highways in South Australia
- Highway 1 (Australia)
- Highway 1 (South Australia)
- Lower Light protest statues
