= Dry Creek railway station =

Railway station in Adelaide, South Australia

Dry Creek
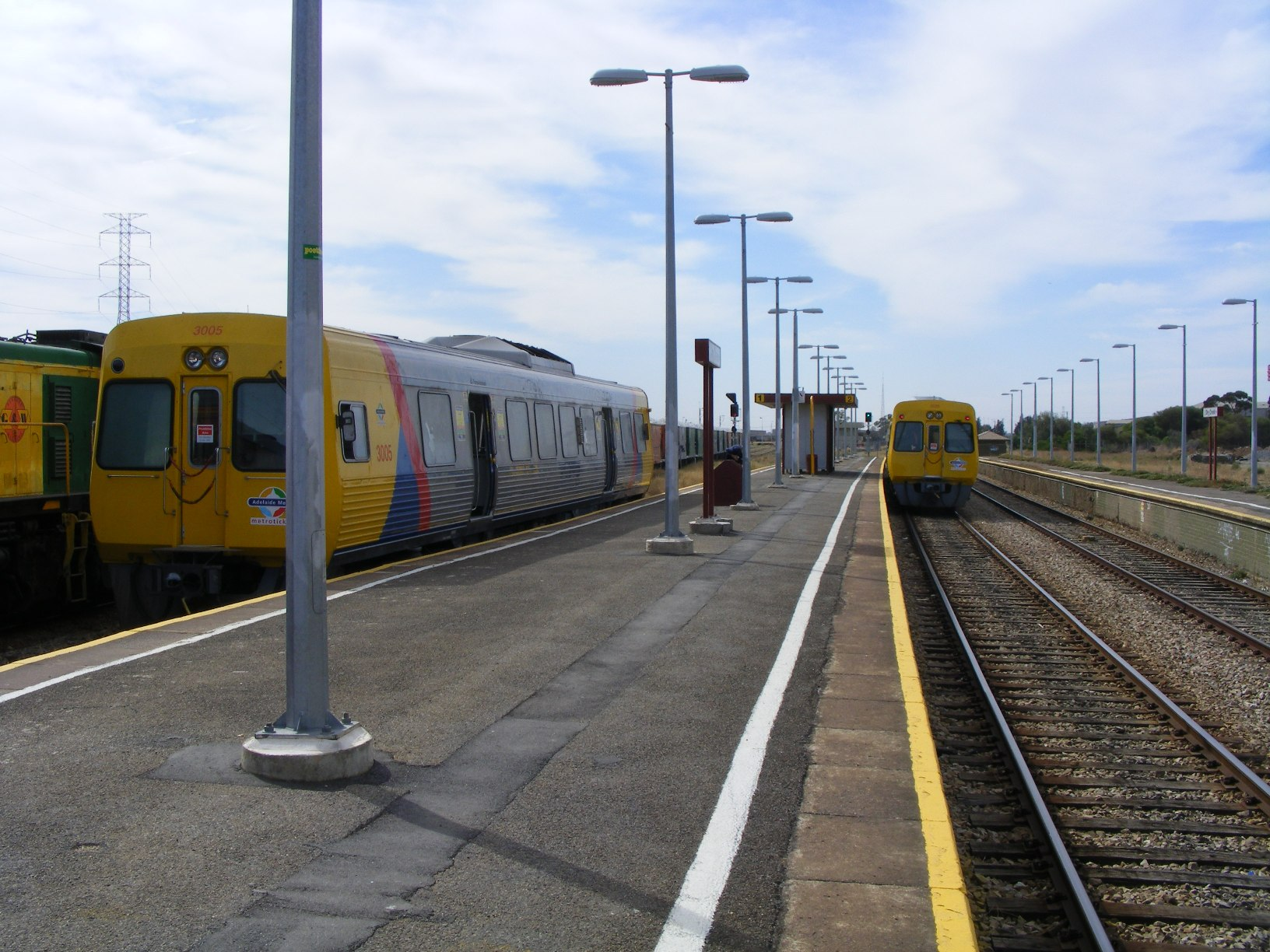
- Northbound view from Platform 2 prior to construction of the railcar depot, April 2008

General information
- Location: Railway Terrace, Dry Creek
- Coordinates: 34°50′06″S 138°35′08″E
- Owner: Department for Infrastructure & Transport
- Operator: Adelaide Metro
- Line: Gawler
- Distance: 10.6 km from Adelaide
- Platforms: 3 (1 island, 1 side)
- Tracks: 3
- Connections: None

Construction
- Structure type: Ground
- Parking: None
- Cycle facilities: Yes
- Accessible: Yes

Other information
- Station code: 16507 (to City); 18542 (to Gawler Central)
- Website: Adelaide Metro

History
- Opened: 1856
- Rebuilt: 1982; 2022

Services
Preceding station	Adelaide Metro	Following station
Kilburn towards Adelaide	Gawler line	Mawson Lakes towards Gawler Central
Adelaide Terminus	Gawler line Express	Mawson Lakes towards Gawler Central
Preceding station	TransAdelaide	Following station
Terminus	Northfield line	Cavan towards Northfield
Preceding station	TransAdelaide	Following station
Terminus	Dry Creek–Port Adelaide line	Wingfield towards Port Dock
Location

Dry Creek railway station is located on the Gawler line. Situated in the inner northern Adelaide suburb of Dry Creek, it is 10.6 kilometres (6.6 mi) from Adelaide station.

== History ==
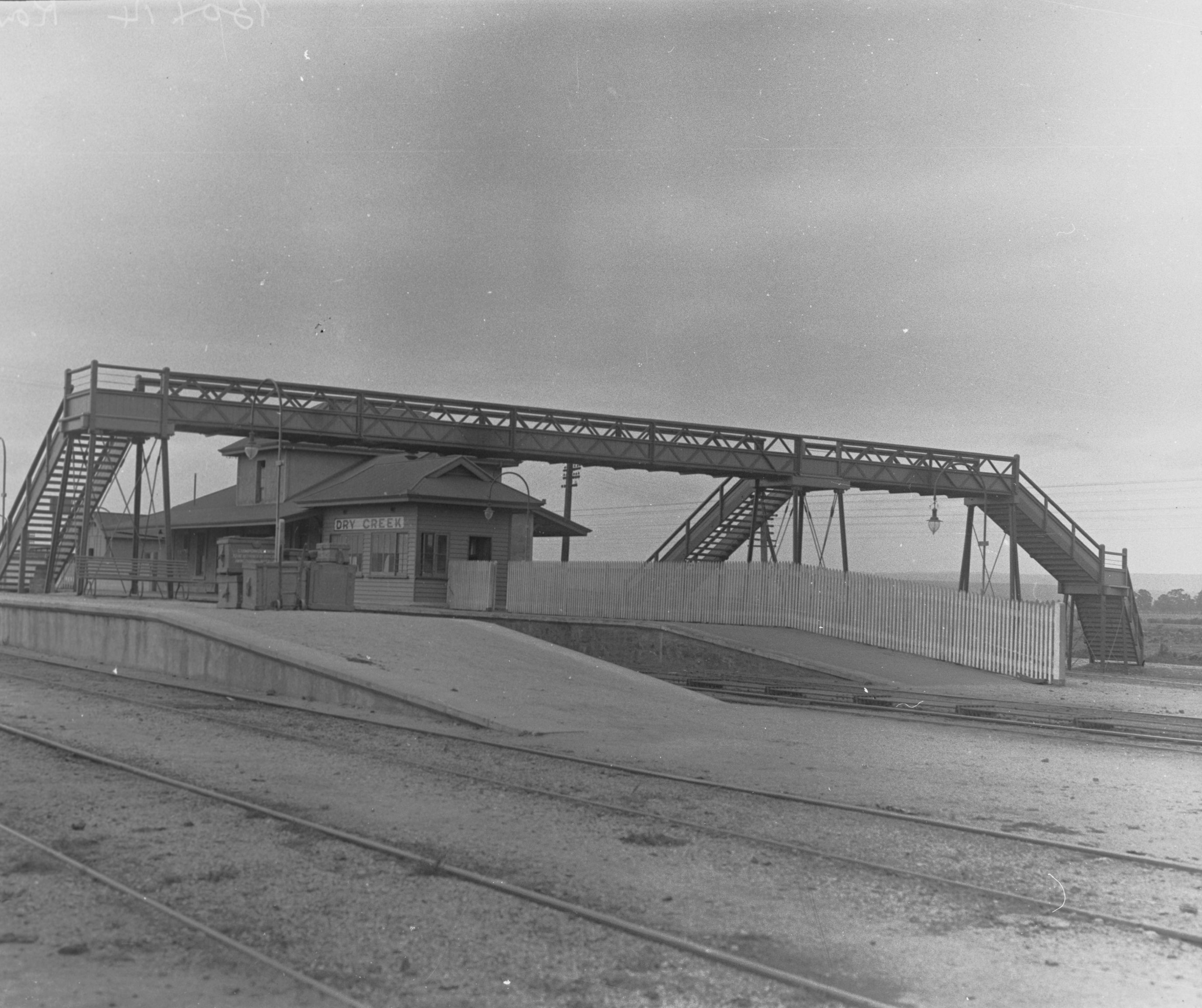
Dry Creek railway station with footbridge, 1915

Dry Creek railway station opened in 1856. The station was rebuilt in 1982 and a bogie exchange facility opened when the Adelaide-Crystal Brook line was converted to standard gauge. The exchange closed in October 1996, having been made redundant by the conversion of the Adelaide to Wolseley line to standard gauge.

The Australian Rail Track Corporation standard gauge line to Crystal Brook runs west of the station. Dry Creek is where the Dry Creek to Port Adelaide railway line branches off via a triangle junction, allowing trains from the north and south to head towards the branch line. There is a major freight terminal and marshalling yard west of the station.

The passenger service on the Dry Creek-Port Adelaide railway line, with stations at Wingfield, North Arm Road, Eastern Parade, Grand Junction Road, and Rosewater, was closed in May 1987. Port Dock closed in September 1981. The former Northfield railway line headed east from Dry Creek to the Cavan, Pooraka, Northfield, and Stockade stations. Stockade was closed in 1961 and the rest were closed in May 1987.

In February 2011, a Adelaide Metro railcar depot was opened to the east of Dry Creek station, replacing a facility outside Adelaide station. The depot was designed as a major maintenance and re-fuelling facility for the 3000 and 2000 fleets, with over 11 kilometres of track providing the capacity to store 70 railcars.

All 2000 class trains had been retired by 2015. The Gawler line was electrified and reopened on 12 June 2022, giving the 4000 class fleet access to the depot, along the 3000 class fleet. Also as the part of the electrification of the Gawler line, the station was refurbished in early 2022. That included platform resurfacing, new shelters, seating, wayfinding and lighting.

== Platforms and Services ==
Dry Creek has two side platforms and an island platform, and is served by Gawler line trains. Services are scheduled every 30 minutes on weekdays, and most of them terminate at Gawler Central.

Platform	Destination	Notes
1	Adelaide, Gawler and Gawler Central	Platform 1 is not regularly served
2	Gawler and Gawler Central	
3	Adelaide	
