= Pooraka, South Australia =

Pooraka
- Suburb
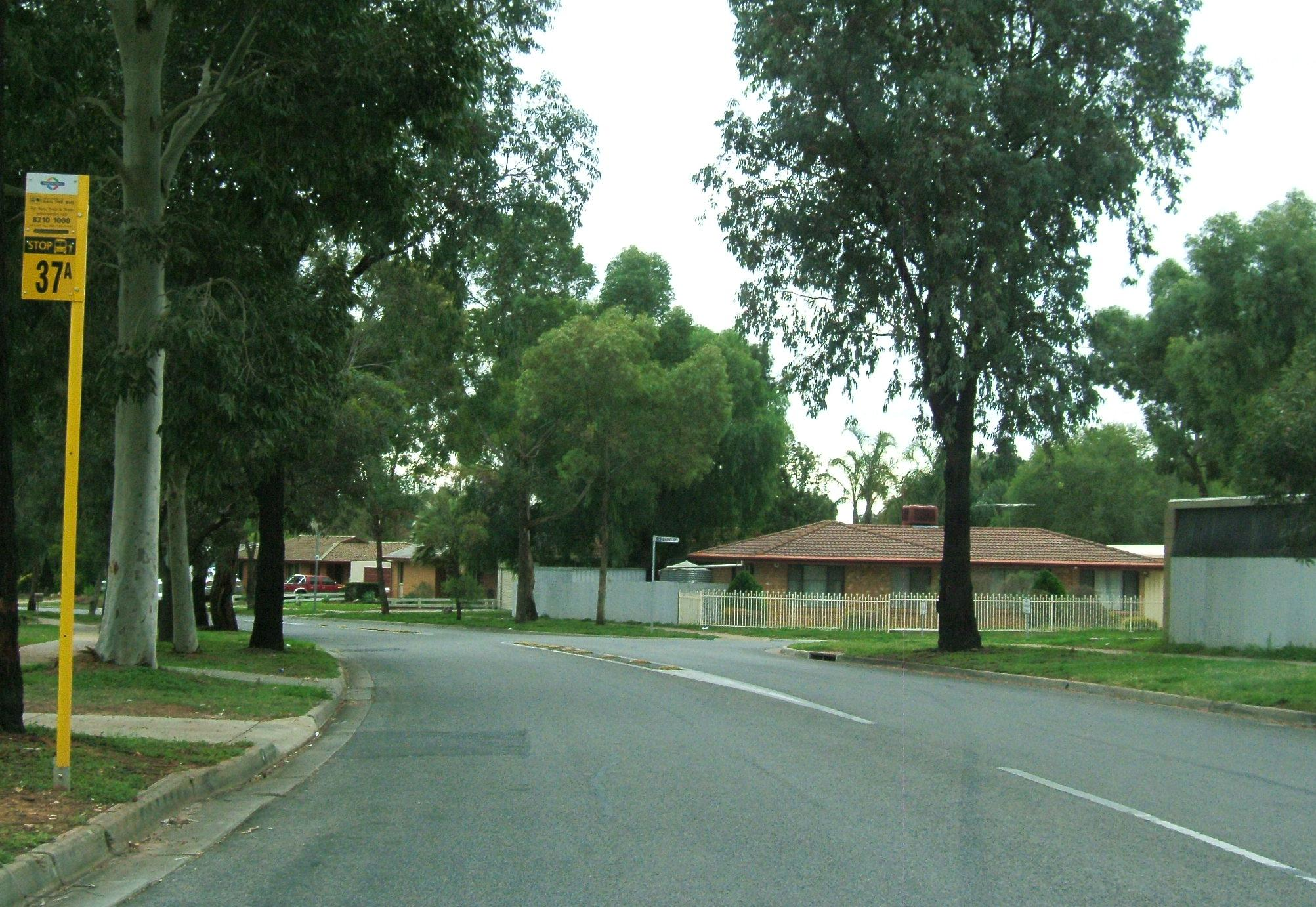
- Street in Pooraka

- Coordinates: 34°49′28″S 138°37′37″E
- Country: Australia
- State: South Australia
- City: Adelaide
- LGA: City of Salisbury
- Location: 12 km (7.5 mi) N of Adelaide city centre

Government
  - State electorate: Florey
  - Federal division: Makin

Population
  - Total: 7,583 (SAL 2021)
- Postcode: 5095
Suburbs around Pooraka
| Mawson Lakes | Parafield | Para Hills West, Para Hills |
| Cavan | Pooraka | Ingle Farm |
| Gepps Cross | Northfield | Walkley Heights |

Pooraka (/pəˈrækə/ pə-RACK-ə) is a suburb in Adelaide, South Australia. It is 12 km (7.5 mi) north of the central business district.

== History ==
The Kaurna people are the people of the Adelaide plains, and inhabited the area for millennia before the colonisation of South Australia.

Pooraka was created as a subdivision of section 97 of the Hundred of Yatala, the latter spanning from Grand Junction Road, at Gepps Cross, to a point north of Montague Road. It was originally known as Dry Creek after the local watercourse (Dry Creek), which is now the name of a modern industrial locality west of Pooraka, at the creek's mouth (Dry Creek, South Australia).

In 1916, the District Council of Yatala renamed the suburb Pooraka, which was believed to be an Indigenous Kaurna word meaning "dry". However, according to linguist Robert Amery, the name bears no resemblance to the Kaurna words for "dry" or "creek". The term has been identified as a New South Welsh Indigenous name for the turpentine tree, which is not found in South Australia.

Pooraka East Post Office opened on 1 December 1965 and closed in 1986. A railway station on the Northfield railway line (initially known as Abattoirs, but later renamed Pooraka) operated from 1913 until it was closed on 29 May 1987.

== Notable people ==
Danny and Michael Philippou, twin YouTubers, filmmakers, and stunt performers
