= Northfield railway station, Adelaide =

Former railway station in South Australia, Australia

Coordinates: 34°50′22″S 138°37′24″E

Northfield

General information
- Location: adjacent Briens Road; Northfield
- Line: Northfield railway line
- Distance: 14.3 km from Adelaide
- Platforms: 1
- Tracks: 1

Construction
- Structure type: demolished

History
- Opened: 1857
- Closed: 29 May 1987
- Rebuilt: 1913/1961

Services
Preceding station	TransAdelaide	Following station
Pooraka towards Adelaide	Northfield line	Stockade towards Northfield
Location

Northfield railway station was located 14.3 km (9 mi) from Adelaide station. Despite it being named Northfield, its final location was in the suburb of Pooraka.

== History ==
The Northfield station dates back to 1857 as part of the Dry Creek-Stockade line. The station originally seems to have been located midway between Gawler Road (later Main North Road) and Briens Road and was probably pushed to the eastern side of Briens Road (near the intersection with Howard Road) around the time the Pooraka and Cavan railway stations were added to the line, circa 1913–1914.

In 1961, the turntable was removed and the station was again relocated just to the western side of the road. This time it consisted of a single platform and shelter. At around the same time, the former terminus station, Stockade railway station (which was principally used to carry stone from quarries established behind the Yatala Labour Prison), was closed, and the area incorporated into the suburb of Northfield. In the 1980s, the State Transport Authority decided that it was uneconomical to continue to run trains on the now renamed Northfield line. The last train serviced Northfield on 29 May 1987, and the track was removed shortly after. The station was probably demolished in the 1990s or early 2000s. There is no evidence of the station left as the site is now a skate park and BMX track.
