= Yatala Labour Prison =

Prison in Northfield, South Australia

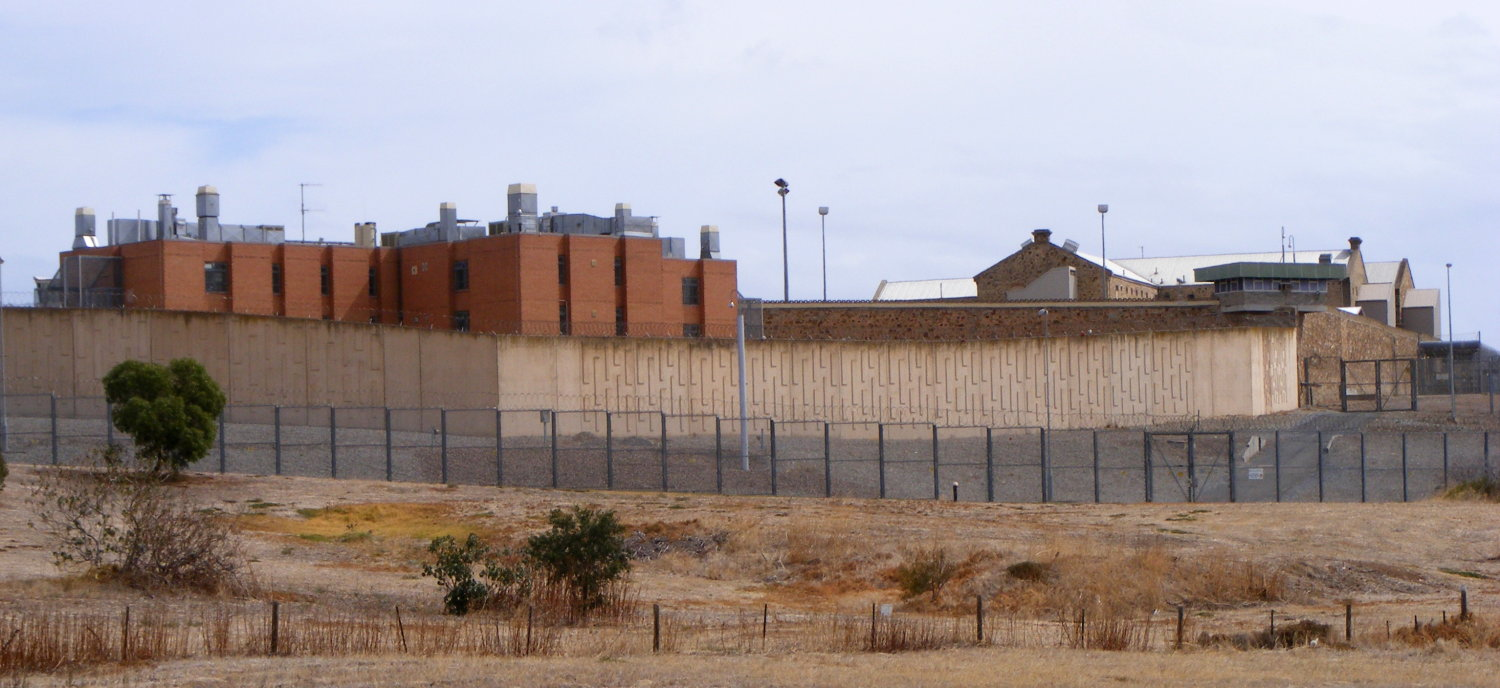
- Rear of the prison complex
- Interactive map of Yatala Labour Prison
- Location: Peter Brown Drive, Northfield, South Australia; 34°50′40″S 138°37′43″E
- Status: Operational
- Security class: Maximum security
- Capacity: 468 (in 2007)
- Opened: 1854
- Managed by: Department for Correctional Services

Yatala Labour Prison (/ˈjætlə/; YAT-luh) is a high-security men's prison located in the north-eastern part of the northern Adelaide suburb of Northfield, South Australia. It was built in 1854 to enable prisoners to work at Dry Creek, quarrying rock for roads and construction. Originally known as The Stockade of Dry Creek or just The Stockade, it acquired its current name from a local indigenous Kaurna word relating to inundation by water, which was used for the Hundred of Yatala.

The prison has been expanded many times but still has functioning buildings that date to the 1850s. It remains Adelaide's main male prison and although it was scheduled to be closed by 2011, it has remained open due to the 2008 financial crisis leading to a lack of funding for a replacement prison.

== Geography and naming ==
Yatala prison, originally called "The Stockade" or "The Stockade of Dry Creek" when established in 1854, was named after the cadastral Hundred of Yatala. The word is presumed to refer to the flooded state of the plain either side of Dry Creek after heavy rain, the Kaurna name referring to water or inundation. The prison was renamed Yatala Labour Prison sometime before 1860. It is known as a labour prison by virtue of its vast industries complex and the use of prisoner labour in construction.

It is sited in Adelaide's northern suburb of Northfield, 10 kilometres (6 mi) north of Adelaide's central business district and between Grand Junction Road and Dry Creek. The prison sits on an escarpment of the Para Fault Block overlooking the Adelaide plains. Dry Creek, a watercourse usually dry in summer, flows through a deep gully immediately north of the prison boundary. It features outcrops of exposed pre-Cambrian rocks that were once extensively quarried as part of prison activity.

== History ==
For the first five years of South Australian settlement there was no permanent prison. Prisoners were kept locked in irons on board HMS Buffalo until its sailing in 1837, and in temporary jails subsequently. 1841 saw the first permanent prison built in Adelaide, with the Adelaide Gaol on the banks of the River Torrens, the building of which severely strained the new colony's finances.

In the nineteenth century, incarceration in South Australia was seen as a punitive more than preventative measure. The labour of prisoners was used for public works and hard labour seen as an integral part of imprisonment. In this light, Charles Simeon Hare (member of the legislative council) wrote an 1853 letter to the Adelaide Observer, advocating prisoners be usefully employed, and further that a 160-acre (0.65 km^{2}) reserve beside Dry Creek could be used for this purpose. The reserve had an abundant supply of stone that prisoners could convert into building and road material. September that year saw Hare move, in the council, that £5,000 be set aside to enable a prison be constructed next to a quarry, whether at Dry Creek or elsewhere. This would enable the labour of the prisoners to remunerate the country. Hare later became superintendent of the prison and maintained a colourful register describing prisoners.

=== Nineteenth century ===
Twenty five prisoners were sent to the Dry Creek site to work in the quarries in July 1854, living at night in an iron house. Dry Creek prison was officially declared a jail on 10 August 1854 and an act then passed commuting sentences, formerly of transportation to New South Wales or Van Diemen's Land, into imprisonment with hard labour, though transport to the latter had been stopped by the Imperial Government in 1852. The Prison began as an iron house with surrounding palisade and became known as The Stockade, a name retained in 2007 by the adjacent Stockade Botanical Park. Hare requested construction of a stone building, and by October 1854 this was completed using locally quarried bluestone, with accommodation for 60 prisoners.

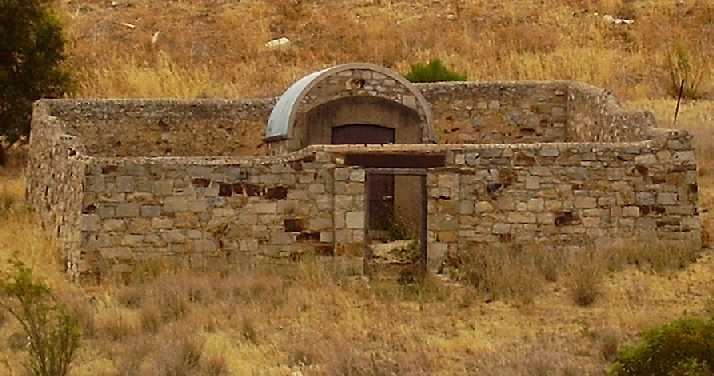
Yatala's powder magazine, used in quarrying

In its early years rock-cracking, hard labour and solitary confinement were the notable features of life at the prison. It was seen that hard worked prisoners would not wish to return to the prison, with solitary confinement giving them time to reflect on past misdeeds. From inception prisoners main task was the breaking of one cubic yard of rock per day. Until the middle of the twentieth century the prisons department's philosophy remained punitive with much reliance on obedience to rules and regulations.

The first batch of 24 convicts was sent to the prison from Adelaide jail on 9 February 1855 wearing the characteristic broad arrow pattern prison clothes of the time, and the first escape from the prison took place October 1855 with 8 escapees. The prisoners were captured, chained in solitary confinement within the prison, then subsequently punished with 50 lashes for the escape and other disciplinary issues.

For the prison, water supply was a constant issue, with carriage required from distant Port Adelaide. A well was bored in 1856 through 60 feet (18 m) of limestone but soon ran dry. For storage of rainwater, in 1860 a 300,000-imperial-gallon (1,364,000 L; 360,000 US gal) reservoir was constructed under the main courtyard. Water supplies continued to be inadequate until the 1878 construction of a pipeline to the Hope Valley Reservoir.

A railway line and terminus, called the Stockade railway station, was opened on 1 June 1857 to service the facility and to aid with stone transportation. It remained in use until its closure and removal in 1961.

The first significant expansion of the prison buildings occurred in 1858 with the construction of B Division. Built in the centre of the prison with 123 cells and, in the nineteenth century, designed to hold 300 prisoners. A new wing was added in 1872 with 36 cells, guard accommodation and a wall separating it from the rest of the prison, with 37 more cells added in 1878. By 1880 the accommodation was seen as insufficient for the 280 prisoners then held, with up to three per cell and eighteen per dormitory room. A T shaped building was constructed in 1884 with 96 cells over three floors, and the walled area expanded. The building included a chapel, offices and three dark underground cells used for solitary confinement. Known as A Division, it was built by prisoners at the jail as part of their enforced labour.

=== Twentieth century ===
Prisoners moved from rock breaking to goods production with trades including boot making, tailoring, tin smithing, blacksmithing, carpentry and masonry. There was public opposition as the free labour of prisoners was seen as unfair competition against private industry, consequently Government departments used most products. During the 1960s small industries were established north of the prison walls with facilities for spray painting, sheet metalwork and brick making. A decision was made in 1968 to build a new industries complex. Construction was from 1977 to 1982, with the complex opening in November 1984.

C Division was created in 1957, as a minimum-security building, outside the main prison walls with a dining room added in 1967. B Division was redesigned and reequipped in 1958. The special education section of the education department opened a school at the prison in 1976 and Technical and Further Education began participating in prisoner education at Yatala from 1979.

In 1962, prisoners at Yatala participated in medical experiments at the University of Adelaide, with the prison's sheriff J. H. Allen stating they had volunteered for experimentation as part of "community service". H. R. Oaten, the state president of the Australian Medical Association, stated that the experiments were in breach of the World Medical Association's code of ethics, but "was confident the prisoners would come to no harm".

Although a high security prison, there have been some significant prisoner escapes. Four prisoners escaped in 1930, and lead the police on a car chase with whom they were involved in a shootout. After escaping into school grounds they were recaptured, with two of the police injured. Six prisoners escaped from the jail in 1979 after an attempted mass break-out by thirty. A wall that was under repair and covered in scaffolding was used as part of the escape, but all six escapees were soon recaptured. There was poor morale amongst inmates in the 1980s leading to a major prison riot. Sixty prisoners went on a rampage on 22 March 1983, and lit fires, destroying the roof of A division. The government saw this as an opportunity to restructure Yatala, rather than simply repairing the damage, and on 21 December announced that A division would be demolished. The former Enfield Council strongly objected due to the building's historic value but demolition began on 6 February 1984.

== Yatala labour prison today ==
The prison holds high, medium and low security prisoners, and is South Australia's main induction and reception prison for male prisoners. It retains industry facilities that are the largest in the South Australian prison system, and is run by the South Australian government's Department for Correctional Services. Some of the original buildings and parts of old equipment can still be seen from a creek level walking trail, between the prison and new suburb of Walkley Heights. These include guard towers, quarries, a blacksmith's shop and a gunpowder magazine.

The prison is divided into four units plus an additional unit to alleviate overcrowding.

- B Division: high- and medium-security mainstream unit; the working division includes industries such as panda, assembly, joiners, spray and sign shop and ground maintenance. The clothing colour is dark green.
- E Division: assessment and induction unit. The clothing colour is dark blue.
  - E Unit 4: a small wing of E Division for fine default prisoners; accommodates 16 prisoners.
- F Division: protection unit; inmates do all cooking and laundry for the jail. The clothing colour is light blue.
- G Division: highest security section of the prison; prisoners are under total separation.
- Holden Hill: extra unit added on 2016 to alleviate critical bed-space crisis in South Australian prisons; accommodates 19 prisoners.

Yatala is reported as having 603 prisoners in a facility designed for 341. The prison was to be closed by 2011 when a new prison at Mobilong was completed, with some buildings retained for their historic value. Plans to develop land for residential housing were canceled due to lack of funding.

A new roster was implemented on 2 July 2011 despite a widespread outcry and criticism by the staff. Stephen Mann was the previous General Manager of Yatala. He was succeeded by Brenton Williams and currently Tracy Watkins. Paul Laister is Peter Forrests successor of the PSA representative for Echo Division. The new gatehouse was opened in March, 2013 by David Brown, the Chief Executive of Department for Correctional Services. The reception area includes two state of the art turnstile machines, which can detect any concealed drugs and metal objects. It is also equipped with an X-ray scanning machine. After checking through the turnstiles, visitors and staff must go through an iris scan and fingerprint detecting booths to gain entry into the prison.

== Notable prisoners ==
- Alan Bond – businessman, spent a brief time in Yatala during his fraud trial in the early 1990s.
- John Bunting – serial killer, ringleader in the Snowtown murders, and his accomplices Robert Wagner, James Vlassakis, and Mark Haydon.
- Bevan Spencer von Einem – convicted murderer and suspected serial murderer.
- Jean Eric Gassy – deregistered Sydney psychiatrist who shot dead South Australia's head of mental health in October 2002.
- David Hicks – the Australian Guantánamo Bay detainee initially convicted by US military tribunal of providing material support for terrorism. Hicks was released in December 2007; his conviction was overturned in 2015.
- James William Miller – served six consecutive life sentences for murder in relation to the Truro Murders. Died of cancer in 2008.
- Bradley John Murdoch – convicted murderer of Peter Falconio, was held briefly in the prison before being extradited.
- Rupert Maxwell (Max) Stuart (1932–2014) – Arrernte man whose 1959 conviction for murder led to a Royal Commission and a 2002 film, paroled in 1973.
- Rodney Clavell – He had worked as a prison officer at Yatala and Mobilong prisons in the early 2000s, before turning to a life of crime. He took his own life during a siege after being pursued by police in 2014.

== See also ==
- Hundred of Yatala
- District Council of Yatala
