= Lower Light protest statues =

Coordinates: 34°30′08″S 138°24′16″E

The Dublin protest statues are a series of large steel sculptures created from recycled materials located between Lower Light, South Australia and the town of Dublin on the Port Wakefield Road.

== Sculptures ==
The works consist of a large rat, a blowfly, a dunny, two people in an environmental lookout, a UFO, a cockroach, a caricature of Ned Kelly, and a tin man.

The statues were made by local resident and farmer, Stephen Jones, as a protest against the establishment of a dump in the late 1990s by the Olsen government, as part of a plan to replace the Wingfield Waste & Recycling Centre. Although the protest was unsuccessful, the statues remained, and are now regarded as part of South Australia's political and cultural history, to the extent that they were nominated for heritage status by David Winderlich in 2009.

In 2013 the cockroach was removed from the set when the owner of the land relocated and decided to sell the property. The cockroach was relocated to a scrapyard in nearby Two Wells. This led to a Facebook campaign by Andrew Costello. The campaign led to Costello learning about the current location of the cockroach, and he purchased it from the owners for "two slabs of beer". After being restored and temporarily relocated to Rundle Mall, the cockroach was to be returned to the original site in 2014.
