= Ingle Farm, South Australia =

Ingle Farm
- Suburb
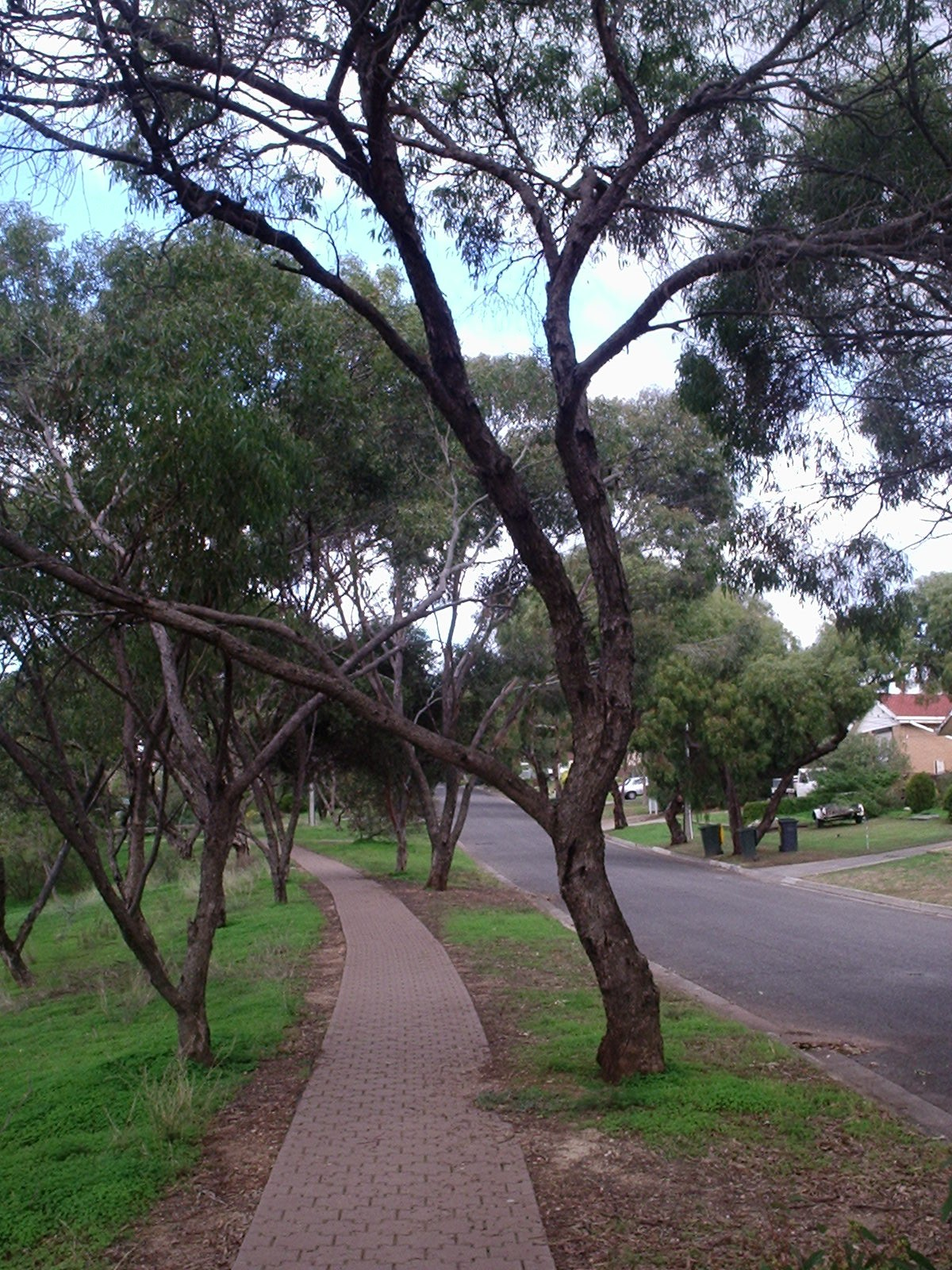

- Country: Australia
- State: South Australia
- LGA: City of Salisbury
- Established: 1959

Government
  - State electorate: Florey
  - Federal division: Makin

Population
  - Total: 9,543 (SAL 2021)
- Postcode: 5098
Suburbs around Ingle Farm
Pooraka	Para Hills	Para Hills
Pooraka	Ingle Farm	Para Vista
Pooraka, Walkley Heights	Walkley Heights	Valley View

Ingle Farm is a residential suburb, with some parklands, of about 8,500 people in the South Australian capital city of Adelaide. It is located at the base of the Mount Lofty Ranges foothills, around 12 kilometres north-east of Adelaide's central business district. It covers an area of 4.47 km^{2} with a population density of 19.41 people per hectare in 2001.

== History ==
James Rowe arrived in South Australia on 22 April 1837 on the ship South Australian, spending two years on Kangaroo Island before settling with his family in the Ingle Farm area in 1848. They initially took up 100 acres (0.40 km^{2}) in section 3030, Hundred of Yatala in 1849, using the land primarily for farming wheat, barley, peas, and hay. Rowe's grandson, Jabez Sleeman Rowe (1871-1955), took on the farm and married Martha Barbara Wright (1868 - 1943), from Inglewood in 1902 consequently leading to the renaming the farm to Ingle Farm.

In 1959, the South Australian Housing Trust purchased 730 acres (3.0 km^{2}) from the Rowe brothers, Cyril (married to Alice) and Slem (married to Jean) Rowe and started a housing estate, with the first Housing Trust homes built in 1965 and 2,500 houses completed by 1975. The Rowe family name is preserved in Rowe Park, next to Ingle Farm Primary School, and Rowe Street in the adjoining suburb of Para Hills.

== Demographics ==
In the 2006 Australian Bureau of Statistics Census of Population and Housing, the population of the Ingle Farm census area was 8,474 people, in an area of 4.47 km^{2}. Females outnumbered males 50.4% to 49.6%. Some 25.7% of the population was born overseas. Ingle Farm has experienced a decreasing population since 1996 resulting from few new houses being constructed and a general decrease in the average number of people living in each house.

== Politics ==
Ingle Farm is part of the state electoral district of Florey, which was created in 1970, and had voted strongly for the Australian Labor Party, with the district mostly remaining a safe Labor seat (except for 1993-1997) until the 2018 election where it was won by ex-Labor, but now Independent, Frances Bedford. As of 2025, it is again a Labor seat.

Federally, the suburb forms part of the electoral Division of Makin. Created in 1984, it has been held by Labor for 30 of its 41 years (with the Liberals retaining it during the Howard era).

== District centre ==
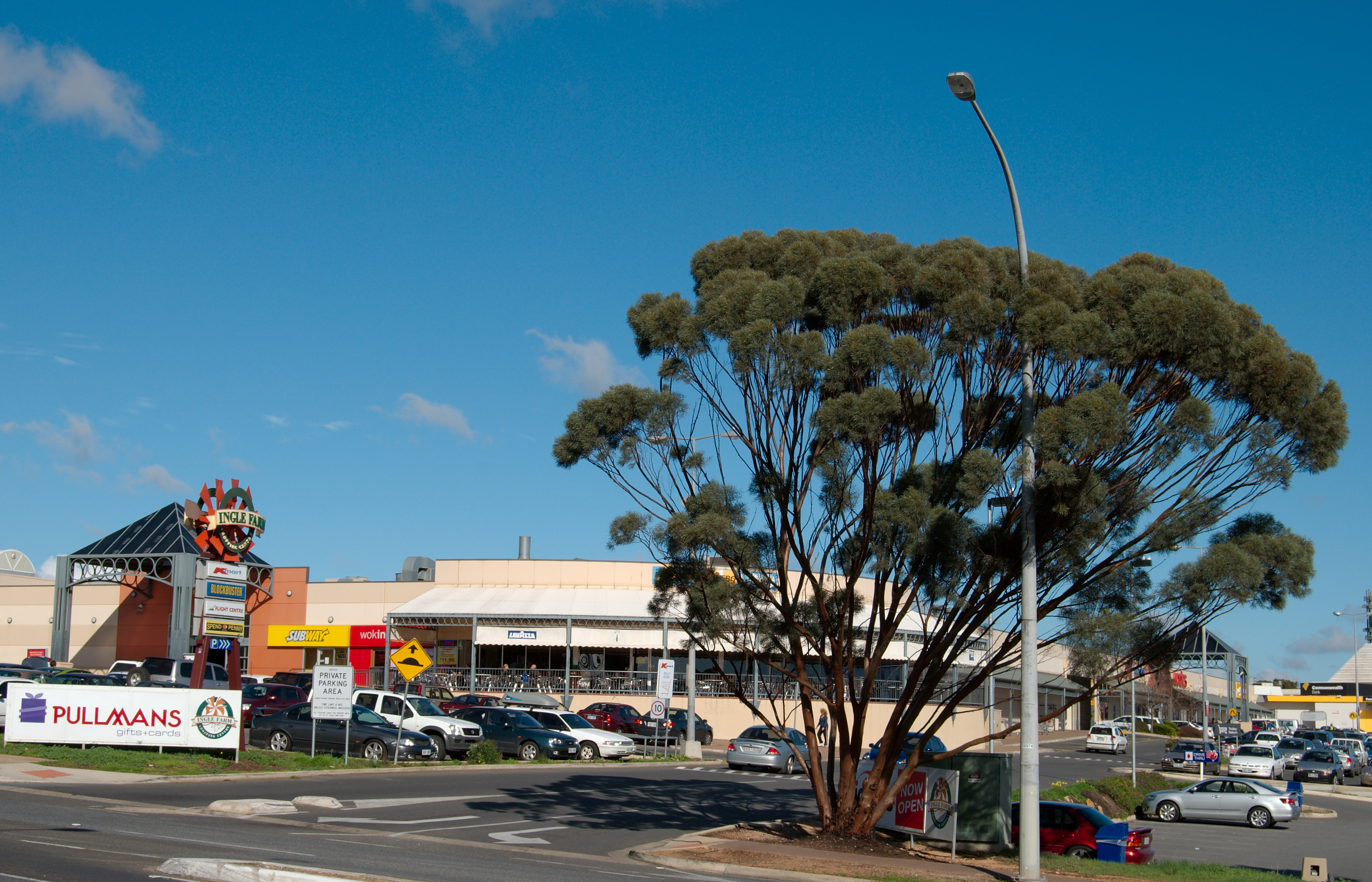
Shopping centre entrance from the main road

A substantial retail and community services zone is located on the south-western corner of the junction of Montague Road and Walkleys Road. Designated by the Metropolitan Adelaide Development Plan as a "District Centre" (second tier in a four tier hierarchy) this zone includes Ingle Farm Plaza (a Colonial First State Property Management property) as well as medical, recreation, aged care and child care facilities.

== Schools ==
The oldest of the three primary schools in the area is Ingle Farm East Primary School (Halidon Street), which opened in 1970 and in 2007 had 289 students enrolled. North Ingle Primary (Rothwell Avenue) opened in 1973. Since its opening the enrolments steadily grew until it hit a peak of approximately 500 students in the late 70's and early 80's but was only about 150 as of late 2008. Ingle Farm Primary School (Belalie Road) was established in 1992 after the amalgamation of Ingle Farm Central Primary, Ingle Heights Primary, and the former Ingle Farm Primary School. It has the highest enrolment level of the three primary schools with 465 students in 2007. It offers a large number of New Arrivals classes for migrants and students with special needs, currently accounting for approximately half of the enrolments.

Ingle Farm High School was opened in 1975 and amalgamated in 1991 with Para Vista High to form Valley View Secondary School. Ingle Farm Primary School is located at the old high school site.

== Sport ==
Rowe Park in the suburb's south, is home to the Ingle Farm Sporting Club. The club fields teams in Australian rules football, cricket, golf, netball, softball and some indoor sports. The club was originally known as the Ingle Farm Football Club, from its formation in February 1968, and was renamed in 1993. The football club first competed in the Central Districts Football Association, transferred to the Norwood-North Association in 1974, then to the South Australian Amateur Football League in 1978.

Walkleys Park in the suburb's north-east is home to Ingle Farm Amateur Soccer Club who take part in the SAASL Sunday Competition. The club was formed in 1973 and has played at Fairfax Road, Ingle Farm since 1979. Green and white have been the club's colours since its inception. The club currently has 7 teams: 1st Team, Reserves, C Team, C2 Team, C3 Team, Over 35's and Women's. IFASC has been successful in the past 13 years winning many trophies including SAASL Sunday Premier League, SAASL Division 2 and 3 leagues. The club also won the SAASL Challenge Cup in 2009 and 2015 beating more than 80 local clubs to the trophy. Most recently the club won the 2025 Over 35's League Title, going undefeated for the entire season.

== Transport ==
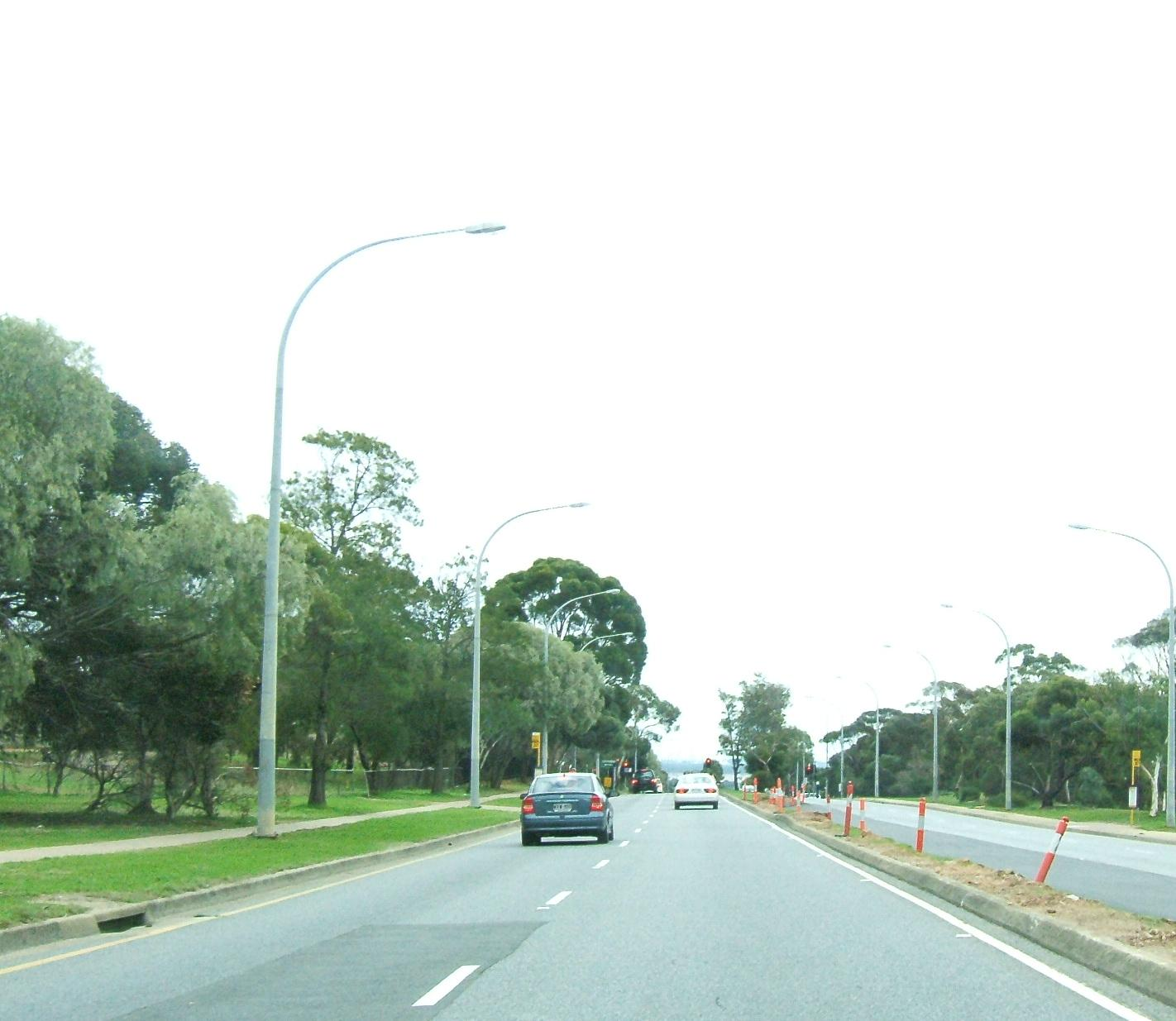
Montague Road, a major thoroughfare in Ingle Farm

Public transport in Ingle Farm is extremely well serviced by Adelaide Metro. Services travel to the Adelaide CBD and nearby northern and north eastern suburbs. Destinations along these routes include the Ingle Farm Plaza, Ingle Farm Primary School, Helping Hand Aged Care facility, Ingle Farm Library and Assemblies of God Church on Baloo Street, Ingle Farm.

- 500/501/502/502X/N502 - Limited stop service
  - 500 buses travel to the city from Elizabeth Interchange via Salisbury Interchange, Bridge Road, Walkleys Road and the Adelaide O-Bahn. This service has limited night and no weekend services. Connections can be made between this bus service and route 202.
  - 501 buses travel to the city from Mawson Interchange via Montague Road, Walkleys Road and the Adelaide O-Bahn. This service has limited night and no weekend services.
  - 502 buses travel to the city from Salisbury Interchange via Bridge Road, Walkleys Road and the Adelaide O-Bahn. This bus service runs express during peak hours (502X) and does not stop along the O-Bahn. 502 buses run at night and on weekends. N502 buses are the after-midnight service run on Saturday nights. These services generally run hourly until 4am.
- 202/203/N202
  - 202 buses travel to the city from Ingle Farm Plaza via Walkley Heights, Hampstead and North East Roads. Connections can be made between this bus service and route 500, and the 502/502X/N502 outside Ingle Farm Plaza, where the 202 service terminates.
  - 203 buses travel to the city from Tea Tree Plaza Interchange via Beovich Road, Hampstead Road and North East Road. N202 buses are the after-midnight service run on Saturday nights. These service generally run hourly until 4am.
- 209F
  - 209F buses travel to the city from Tea Tree Plaza Interchange via Milne Road, Bridge Road and Regency Roads
- 229/229F/229X
  - 229 buses travel to Gepps Cross from Para Hills via Kesters Road, Williamson Road, Pooraka and Main North Road. Connections to the city are provided by route 228F. 229F buses travel to the city from Para Hills via Kesters Road, Williamson Road, Pooraka and Main North Road. 229X buses travel to the city from Para Hills via Kesters Road, Williamson Road, Pooraka and Main North Road and run express from stop 29 Main North Road.
- 560/565
  - 560 buses travel from Tea Tree Plaza Interchange to Elizabeth Interchange via Montague Road and Bridge Road.
  - 565 buses travel from Mawson Interchange to Ingle Farm via Montague Road and Belalie Road.
