= Walkley Heights, South Australia =

Walkley Heights
- Suburb
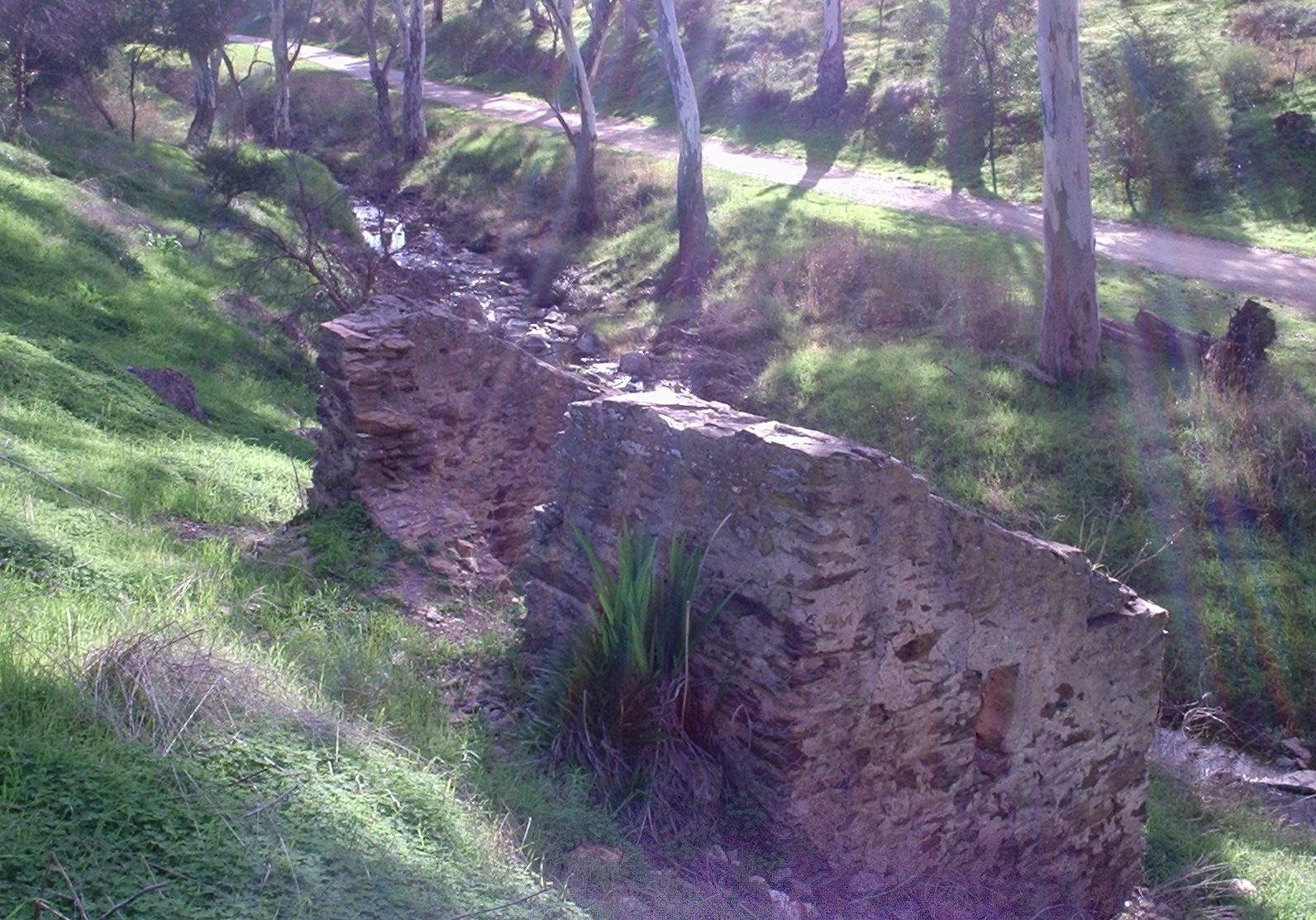
- Walkley Heights reserve

- Country: Australia
- State: South Australia
- City: Adelaide
- LGAs: City of Salisbury; City of Port Adelaide Enfield
- Established: 1995

Government
  - State electorate: Florey
  - Federal division: Makin

Population
  - Total: 3,513 (SAL 2021)
- Postcode: 5098
Suburbs around Walkley Heights
	Ingle Farm	Para Vista
Pooraka	Walkley Heights	Valley View
Northfield	Oakden	Gilles Plains

Walkley Heights is a suburb of Adelaide, South Australia. The suburb is located on land formerly comprising the prison farm for Yatala Labour Prison, and includes fifty-five hectares of land formerly owned by R. M. Williams which was compulsorily acquired during the time of former State Premier Sir Thomas Playford. The suburb (and one adjacent main road) is named after John Walkley, an early pioneer in South Australia

The suburb had a population, in 2001, of only 713 increasing to 3,497 by 2016.

== Facilities ==
A small shopping centre at the end of Homestead Avenue has a Drakes supermarket, a pizza shop, a bakery, a Salvation Army opportunity shop, a beauty salon and a doctor's surgery. Also there is a childcare centre and kindergarten.

The South Australian Government has a large logistics and technical facility, used by several departments, in Wright Road at the western end of the suburb.

== Environment ==
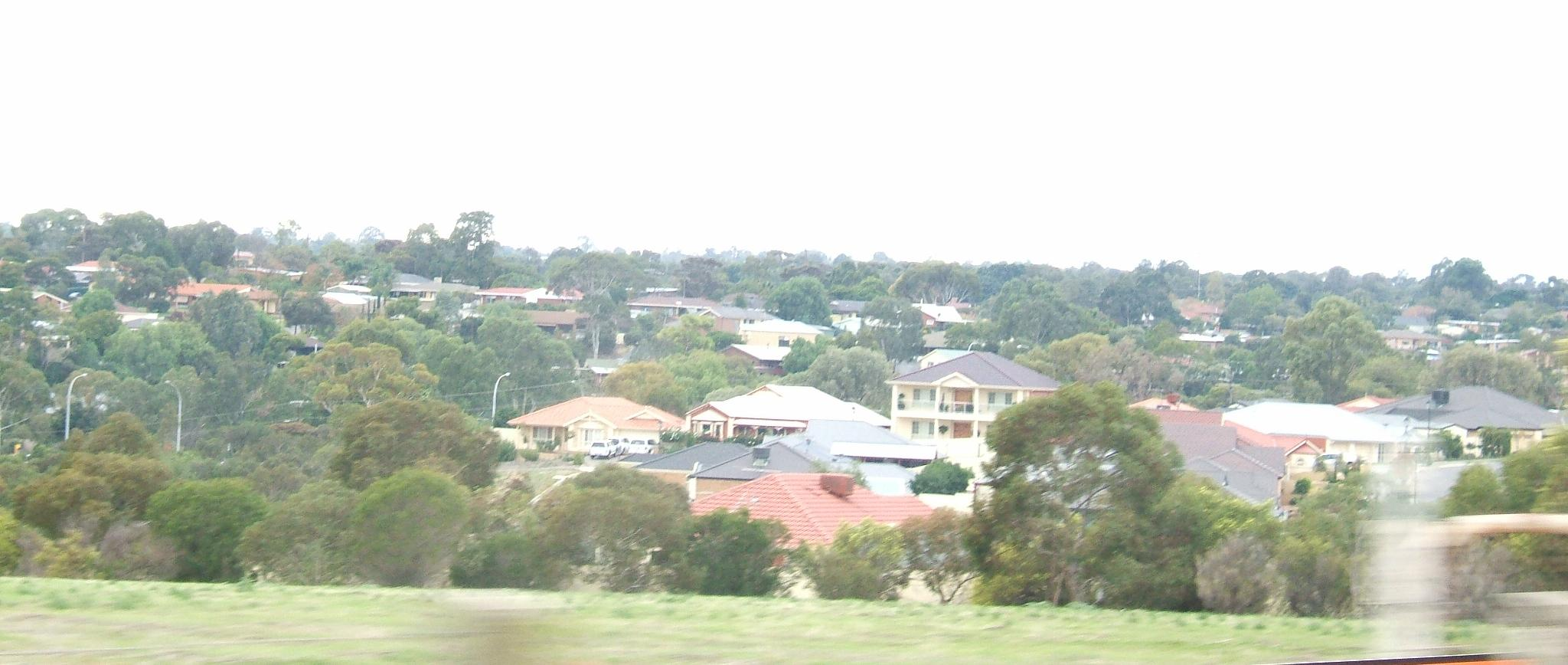
Houses in Walkley Heights

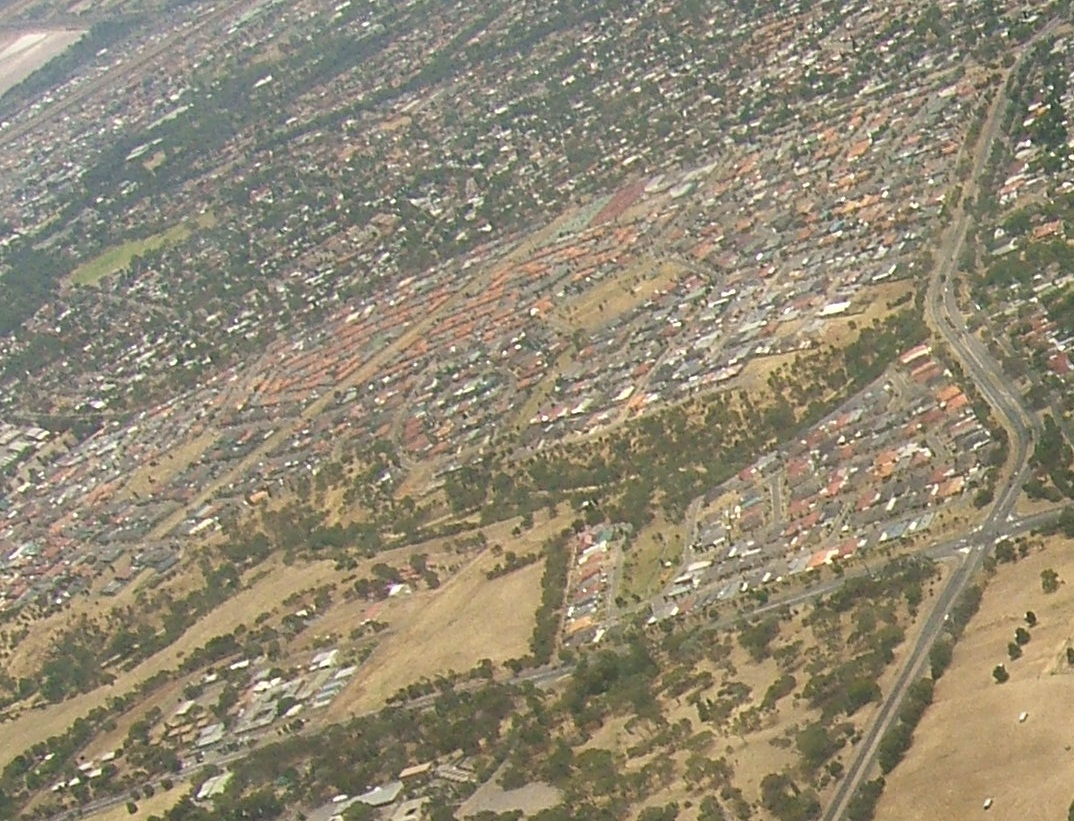
Aerial view of Walkley Heights

The suburb occupies 1.5 square kilometres of land either side of the Dry Creek linear park which features mature river red gums, recent landscaped plantings, and the remains of an old stockman's hut. Within the linear park is the Walkley Heights reserve where mallee box grassy woodland is actively being conserved under the Urban forest biodiversity program.

== See also ==
- List of Adelaide suburbs
