= Stockade Botanic Park =

Park in Northfield, Australia

- Location within City of Port Adelaide Enfield
- Location: Northfield, South Australia
- Coordinates: 34.8415°S 138.6286°E
- Operator: City of Port Adelaide Enfield

Stockade Botanic Park (commonly known also as Stockade Park and Stockade Botanical Park) is a public reserve off Hoods Road in the City of Port Adelaide Enfield's suburb of Northfield. It was formerly associated with a prison quarry but has now been redesigned with water features, an amphitheatre, and picnic areas.

== History ==
The area originally was the end of the Northfield railway line, first opened in 1857 to service the colony's prisoner camp, then known as The Stockade, and especially to convey bluestone quarried from the banks of Dry Creek. In 1878, the quarry supplied 25,000 tonnes of stone to construction projects in the developing city of Adelaide.

Trains last ran to The Stockade in 1961 and the track was removed in 1973. Subsequently, suburban development occurred nearby in Walkley Heights, and the area was established as a community park.

== Description ==
The park features a lake, water features, an amphitheatre, barbecues, picnic areas and toilets, and is popular for weddings and wedding photography. A sensory garden has been established for the enjoyment of visually impaired people and others.

The park is a part of the 14 kilometres (8.7 miles) Dry Creek River Walking Trail.

== See also ==
- List of Adelaide parks and gardens
