= Pooraka railway station =

Former railway station in South Australia, Australia

Coordinates: 34°50′08″S 138°36′29″E

Pooraka

General information
- Location: West of the Gawler Road, now named Main North Road; Pooraka
- Operator: South Australian Railways to 1975 then Australian National Railways Commission (AN)
- Line: Northfield railway line
- Distance: 12.9 km from Adelaide
- Platforms: 2
- Tracks: 20 sidings

Construction
- Structure type: Mostly demolished

History
- Opened: 1913
- Closed: 29 May 1987

Services
Livestock transport, low-frequency passenger; rolling stock storage
Preceding station	TransAdelaide	Following station
Cavan towards Adelaide	Northfield line	Northfield Terminus
Location

Pooraka railway station was located approximately 12.9 km by rail from Adelaide on the former 3.9 kilometres (2.4 mi) long Northfield branch line that opened in June 1857. The station opened as Abattoirs railway station on 12 July 1913, when the adjacent Gepps Cross Abattoirs also opened. The station's livestock sidings extended for most of the 970 metres (1060 yards) of the line between Port Wakefield Road and the Gawler Road (later Main North Road).

== History ==
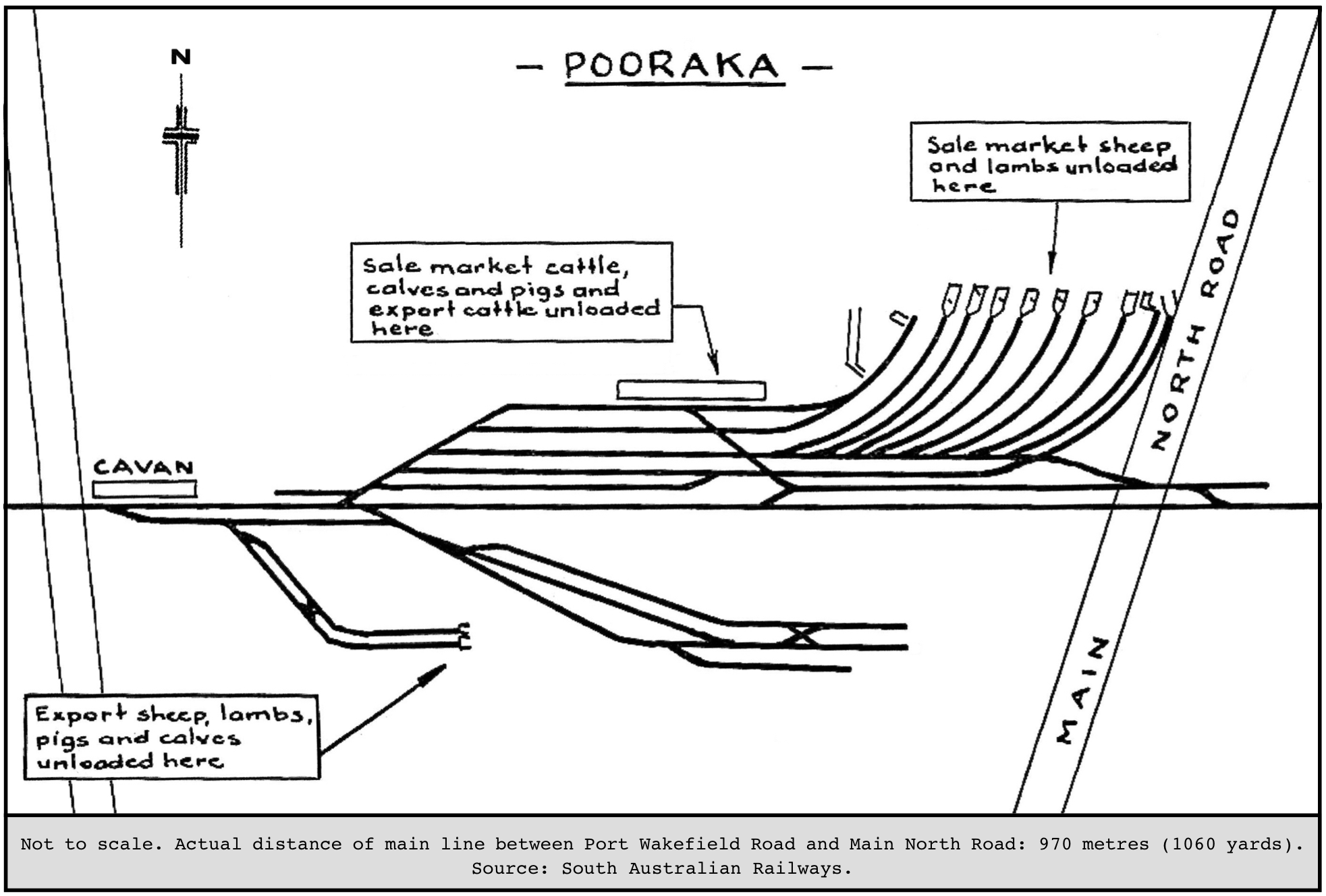
Pooraka's livestock yards were the principal sidings on the Northfield line

The station's name was changed to Pooraka in 1940, matching the name of the then sparsely populated suburb nearby.

Pooraka was a busy location, conducting livestock movements in and out of the adjacent abattoirs and sale yards.

Pooraka closed as an attended station in October 1982 and closed to passenger services on 29 May 1987. Some cattle trains still used the nearby stock ramp sidings until the early 1990s. The signal cabin and station shelter were demolished; as of 2020 both platforms were still in place, heavily overgrown.
