= Stockade railway station =

Former railway station in South Australia, Australia

Coordinates: 34°50′29″S 138°37′43″E

Stockade

General information
- Location: adjacent Hoods Road; Northfield
- Operator: South Australian Railways
- Line: Northfield railway line
- Distance: 15 km from Adelaide
- Platforms: 1
- Tracks: 1

Construction
- Structure type: demolished

History
- Opened: June 1857
- Closed: July 1961
Location

The Stockade railway station, the terminus station of the then Stockade railway line (later the Northfield railway line), was opened on 1 June 1857. It was built to service the colony's prison camp, and to transport bluestone mined by convicts to building projects in downtown Adelaide. After a century of service, it was closed in 1961, and the quarry area was later redeveloped as a park.

== Development ==
The station and single line were opened in 1857 to carry prisoner-mined stone from the quarries behind Yatala Labour Prison (itself originally known as "The Stockade"). It was also used to transfer prisoners and supplies to the prison, which was first opened in 1854. The station was built as the terminus of a branch of what is now the Gawler railway line, making it one of South Australia's oldest rail lines. It was originally planned to extend the line eastward beyond the Stockade to Modbury, passing through the suburb of Valley View, though this never came to fruition. By the 1870s, the extraction of rock was well-developed, and in 1878, for example, the quarry supplied 25,000 tons of stone.

== Closure ==
After World War II, quarrying based on prisoner labour was stopped, as goods production based on a prisoner's learning of a trade increased. Further, with the rise of automobile ownership, the South Australian Railways realised that passenger service on the line was uneconomic as patron numbers were low. In July 1961, Stockade was closed, the turntable removed, and the line cut back to the nearby Northfield railway station, which was itself relocated at this time from the eastern to the western side of Briens Road. Today, the area around the former station and quarry has now been redeveloped as the Stockade Botanic Park.
