= Northfield railway line =

Former railway line in Adelaide, South Australia

Overview
- Locale: Adelaide, South Australia
- Termini: Adelaide; Northfield

Service
- System: Former State Transport Authority Suburban Rail
- Operator(s): State Transport Authority

History
- Opened: 1 June 1857
- Closed: 1987

Technical
- Line length: 14.3 km (8.9 mi)
- Number of tracks: Quadruple track to Torrens Junction; Double track to Dry Creek; Closed from Dry Creek (formerly single track)

The Northfield railway line (formerly Stockade railway line) was a railway line in northern Adelaide running between Dry Creek and Northfield. The line branched east from the Gawler railway line just north of Dry Creek station. In earlier years, it saw mixed freight including livestock in and meat out of the Gepps Cross abattoirs and sale yards. In its later years, it was operated as part of the metropolitan passenger rail network and served three stations: Cavan, Pooraka, and Northfield.

== History ==
The Stockade line (originally terminating at Stockade railway station) was opened on 1 June 1857 at the same time as the Adelaide-Smithfield section of what is now the Gawler line, making it one of South Australia's oldest rail lines. It was built to carry stone from the quarries behind Yatala Labour Prison. Originally intended only for a freight role, in the 19th century the line also catered for passenger traffic. When the Metropolitan and Export Abattoirs Board was formed in 1933, it transferred more slaughter work to Gepps Cross, and a new siding named Export Siding was built in 1937 to deliver sheep and lambs direct to the abattoirs.

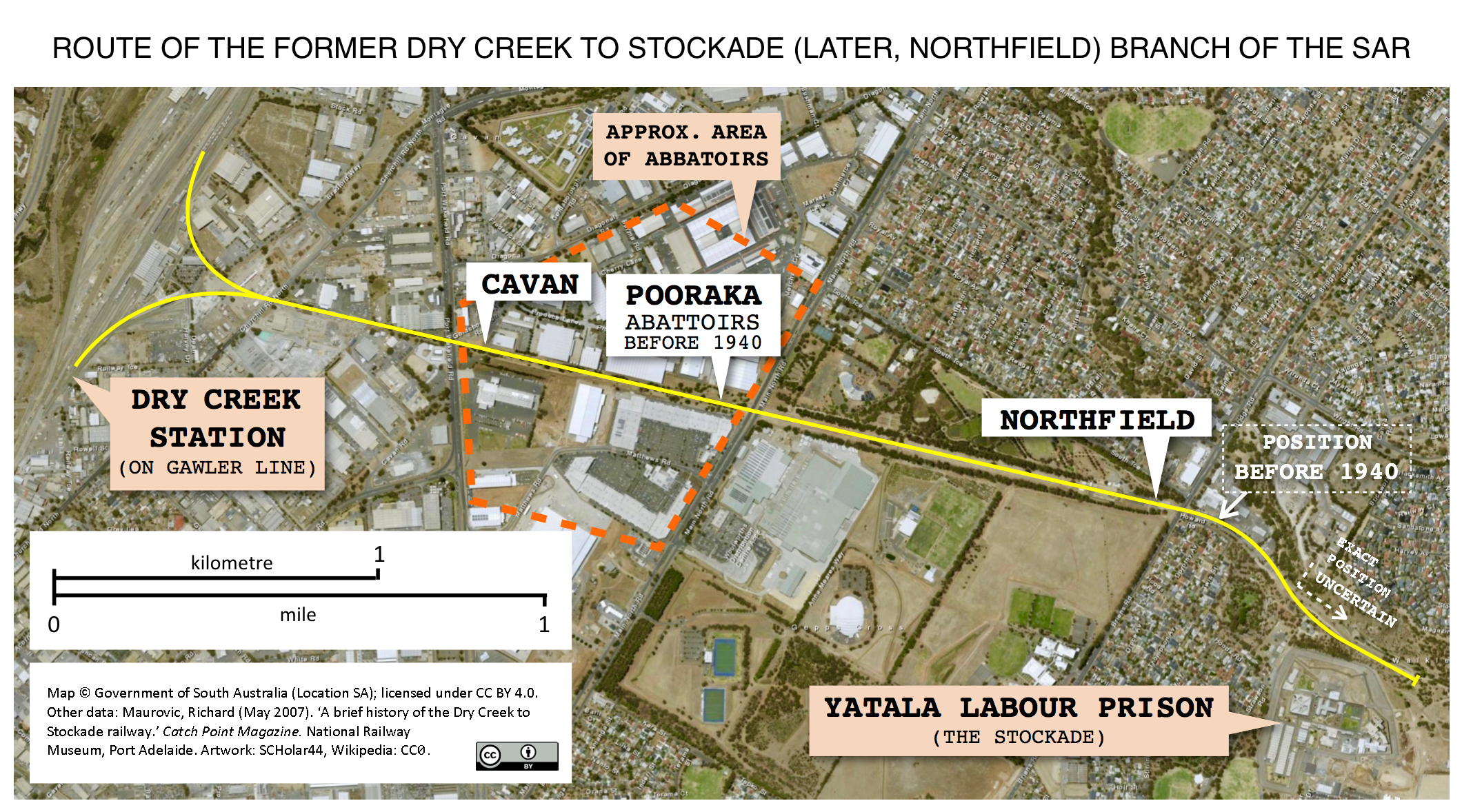
Map of the route of the Northfield branch

=== Closure ===
The terminus station, Stockade, was closed in 1961; the line was cut back to Northfield station and the surplus land was sold. The last passenger trains to Northfield ran in 1987. Livestock continued to be delivered by rail to the Gepps Cross Abattoirs and Livestock Markets sale-yards until 1995. The stations were subsequently demolished and the track was lifted. An 18-metre section of the historic double-headed rail and chairs, used on the far eastern end of the Northfield Line, was recovered for display in the main pavilion at the National Railway Museum, Port Adelaide.

The triangle junction where the track joined to the Gawler line was used by TransAdelaide as a storage area for rails, sleepers and maintenance equipment until 2009. After an announcement that a new railcar depot would be built at Dry Creek to replace the depot on the southern side of Adelaide station yard, the triangle was removed. That project also took over the site of the former Australian Railway Historical Society depot, which had been vacated in 1995.

The dual gauge track from the triangle junction north to Dry Creek North Yard, which ran through former sheep-loading facilities, was leased by TransAdelaide to Genesee & Wyoming Australia for storage of some standard gauge rolling stock before construction of the new railcar depot. The former siding and sheep loading facilities became part of the new depot complex. After the line was closed, services which previously operated from Adelaide to Northfield were cut back to terminate at Dry Creek. They ceased operating in 2008.

In 2019, overgrown remains of Cavan railway station, Pooraka railway station and the rail corridor between Cavan and Pooraka, were all that remained of the line. Between Dry Creek and Cavan the line has been built over; some concrete Train Control telephone cabins still stood on the side of Churchill Road North.

== Line guide ==
Station	Image	Opened	Coordinates	Additional information
Stockade		1 June 1857	34°50′29″S 138°37′43″E	Terminus 1857–1961; closed in July 1961
Northfield		1857	34°50′22″S 138°37′24″E	Terminus 1961–1987; moved west of Briens Road in 1961; closed 29 May 1987
Pooraka		12 July 1913	34°50′08″S 138°36′29″E	Originally named Abattoirs station; closed 29 May 1987; sidings used until 1995
Cavan		1914	34°50′02″S 138°35′59″E	Closed 29 May 1987; sidings used until 1995
Dry Creek		1856	34°50′06″S 138°35′08″E	Former branch station; still in use as part of the Gawler line.
