= Cavan, South Australia =

Cavan
- Suburb
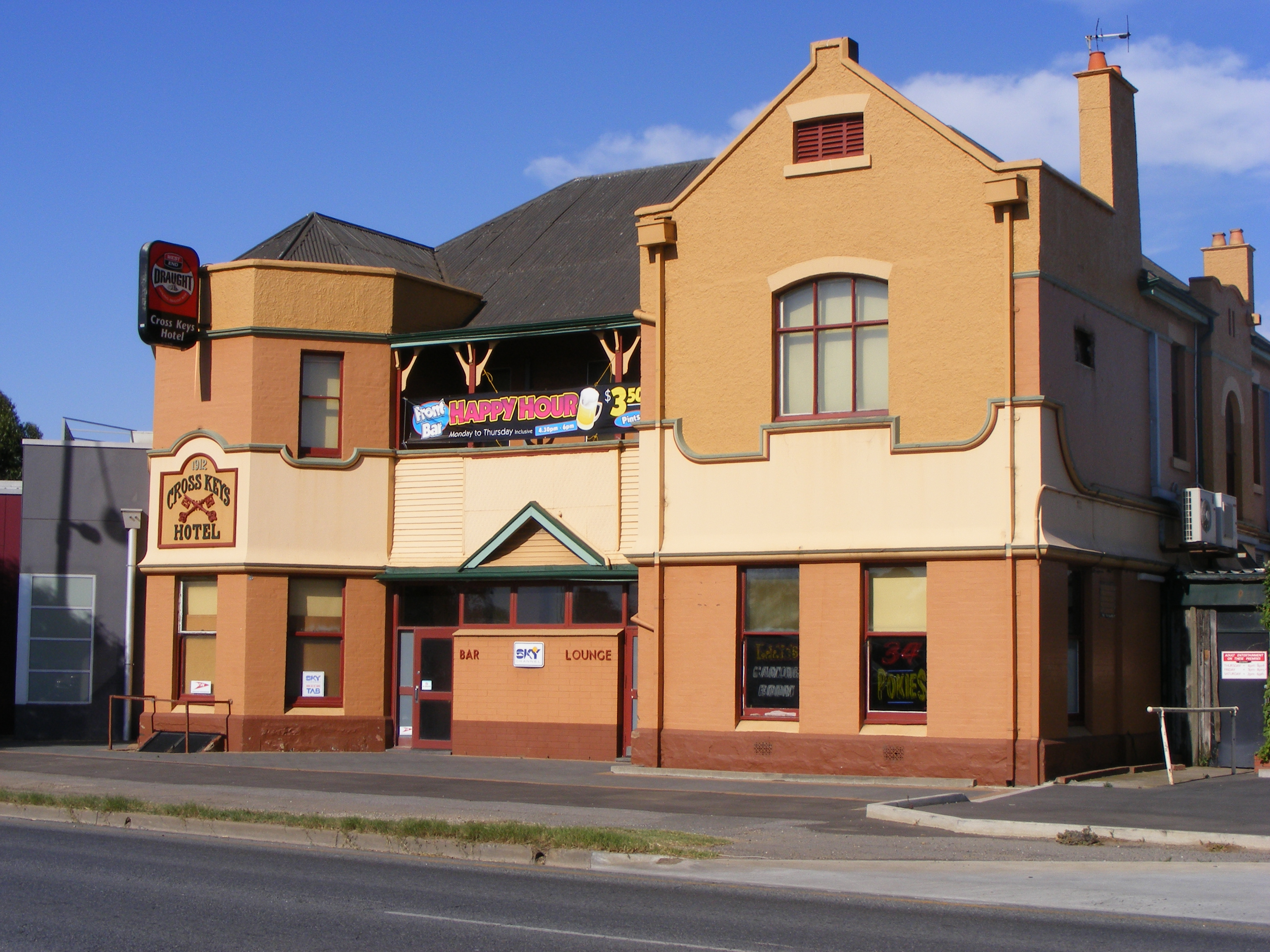
- Cross Keys Hotel, Port Wakefield Road

- Country: Australia
- State: South Australia
- City: Adelaide
- LGA: City of Port Adelaide Enfield
- Established: 1849

Government
  - Federal division: Makin

Population
  - Total: 32 (SAL 2021)
- Postcode: 5094

Cavan (pronounced /ˈkævən/) is a suburb north of Adelaide, within the City of Salisbury local government area.

== History ==
The entire area of what is now Mawson Lakes, Pooraka, and Cavan was originally known as Dry Creek. The suburb was either named by Daniel Brady or B. Gillick, both probably Irish immigrants, after Cavan in County Cavan, Ireland. Brady purchased land and established the 1849 Cross Keys Hotel and Gillick the 1855 Cavan Arms Hotel. However, according to a 2013 article by The Advertiser, the suburb took its name from a local hotel, "The Cavan Arms", which was licensed in 1855 by R.B. Colley who was born in County Cavan in Ireland.

The Northfield railway line, which first opened a station in Cavan in 1914, closed to passenger traffic on 24 July 1987. The Cavan Post Office opened on 2 March 1959 and was later closed in 1974.
