= Dry Creek, South Australia =

Dry Creek
- Suburb
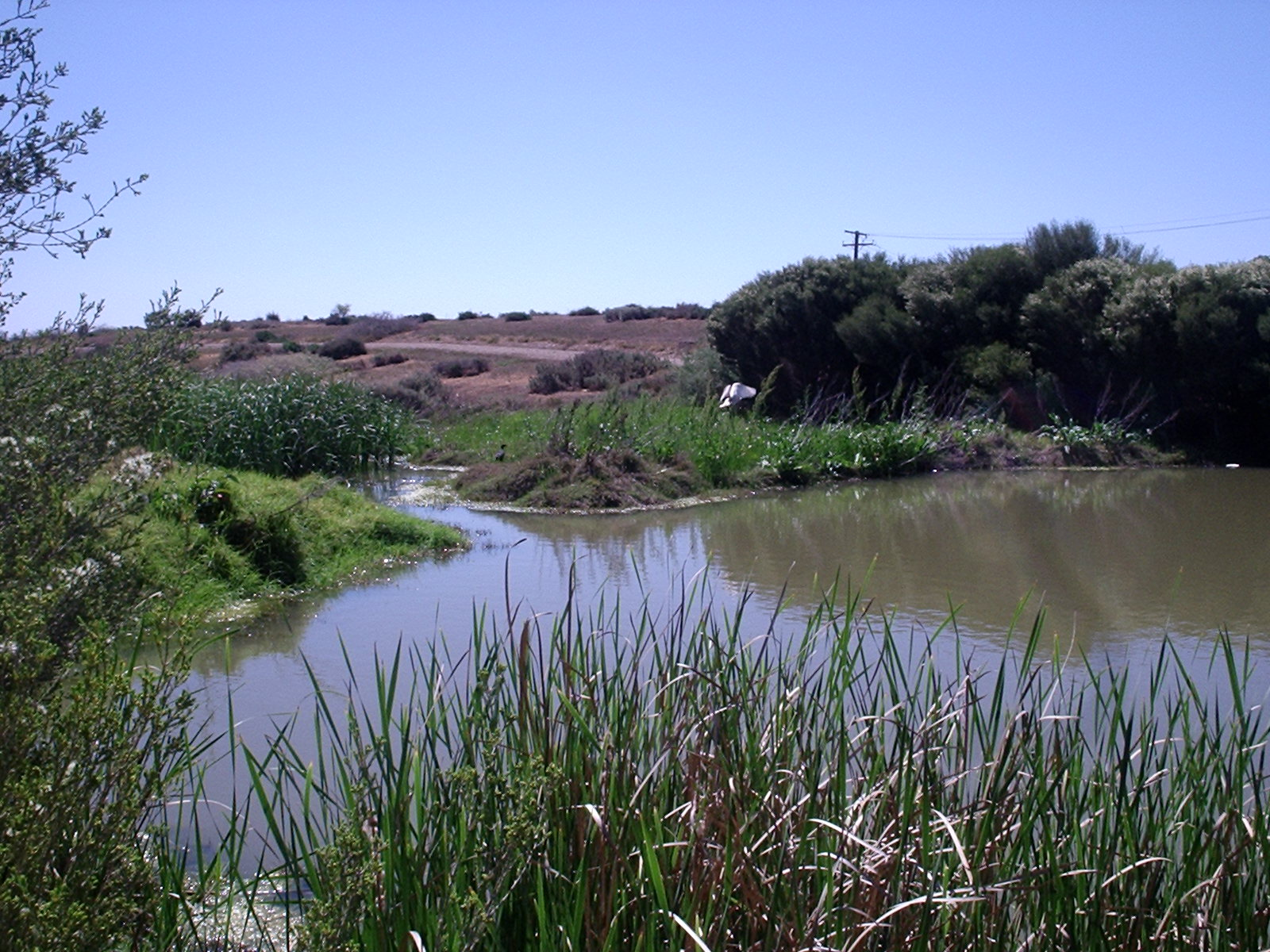
- Barker Inlet wetlands at Dry Creek, 2006

- Interactive map of Dry Creek
- Coordinates: 34°50′S 138°35′E
- Country: Australia
- State: South Australia
- City: Adelaide
- LGAs: City of Salisbury; City of Port Adelaide Enfield

Government
  - State electorate: Port Adelaide (2018) Enfield (2015)
  - Federal division: Makin

Population
  - Total: 232 (SAL 2021)
- Postcode: 5094
Suburbs around Dry Creek
Garden Island	Barker Inlet; Bolivar	Globe Derby Park
Gillman	Dry Creek	Mawson Lakes; Cavan
Gillman	Gillman; Wingfield; Kilburn	Gepps Cross

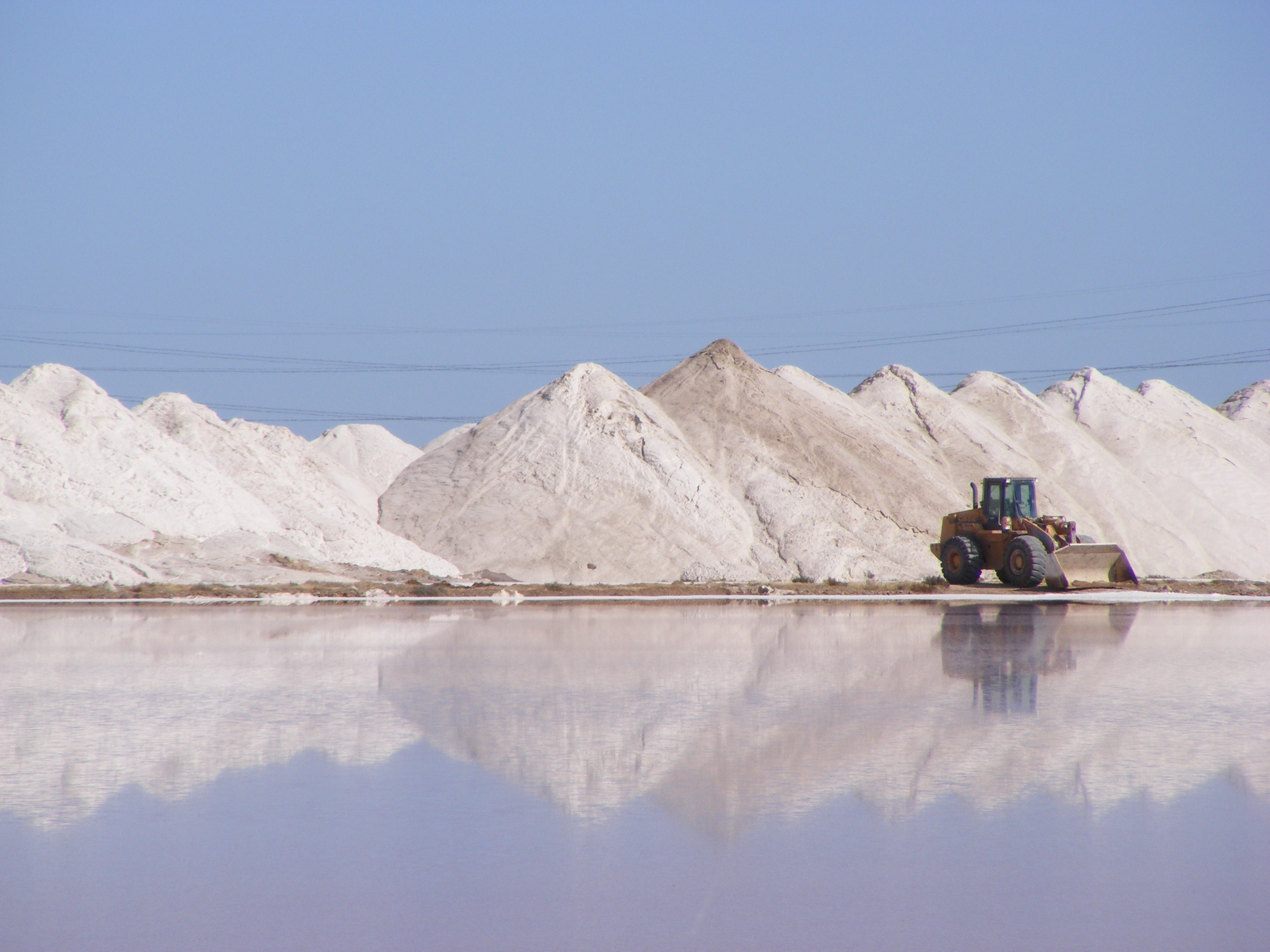
Harvesting salt pans at Dry Creek, 2007

Dry Creek is a mostly industrial suburb north of Adelaide, containing significant wetlands. Until 2014, a substantial area was devoted to salt crystallisation pans and there are plans to redevelop the site for housing.

This housing plan, first proposed in 2008, was revived in 2013, for a proposed 10,000 homes. Salt production ceased in 2014, and in 2016 Ridley Corporation, which managed the salt pans, sold the land to Adelaide Resource Recovery.

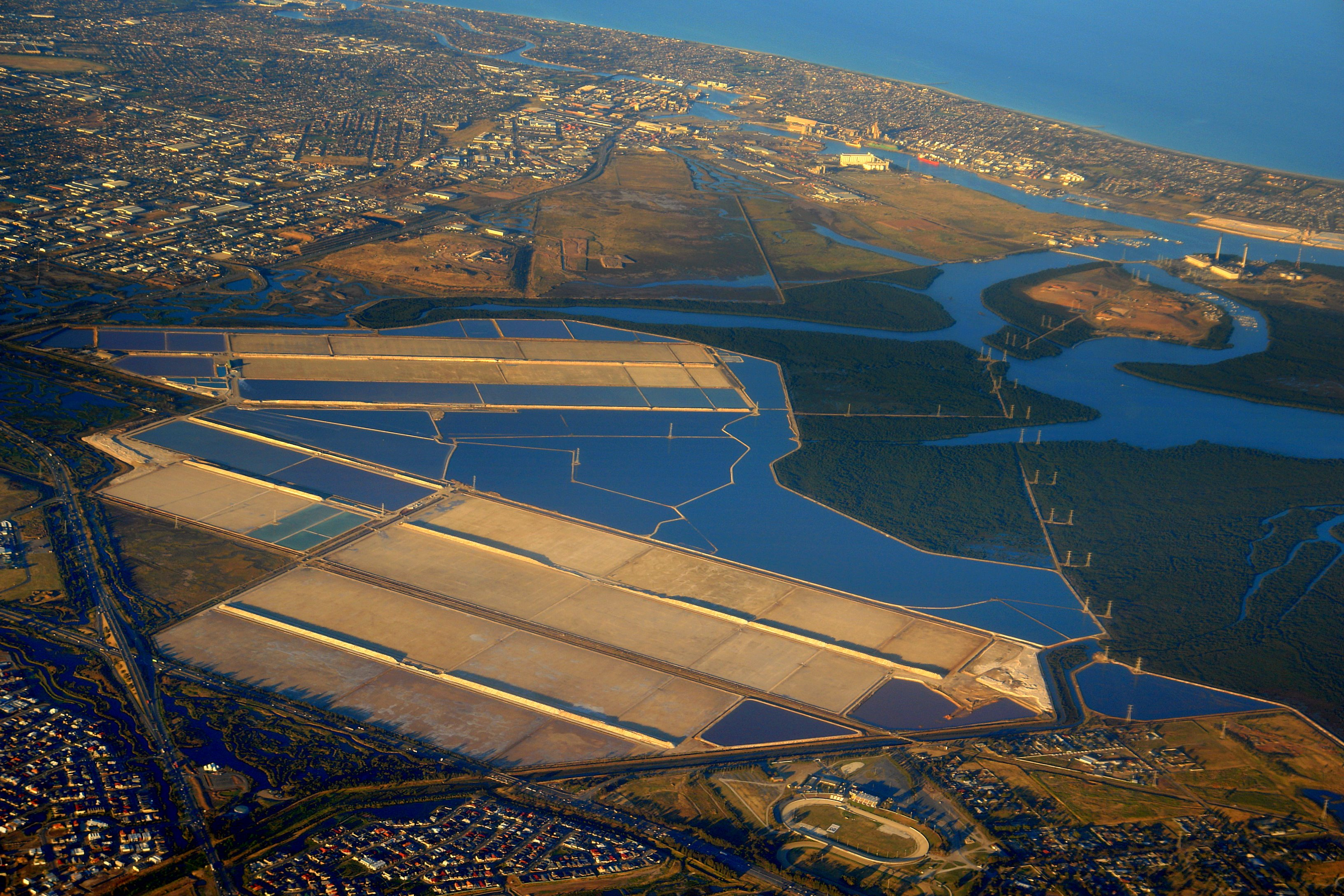
Dry Creek salt crystallisation pans, view to the south-west, 2008. The Dry Creek channel borders the pans along their northern edge (bottom of photo) and joins with Swan Alley creek (just visible on the right of the photo).

== History ==
The area is named for the Dry Creek, a stream and drain which flows through the suburb and into Swan Alley, a tidal distributary of Barker Inlet, Gulf St Vincent.

After 1923, Dry Creek was the site of the soapworks of W. H. Burford & Sons. The factory was adjacent to the Dry Creek railway station, and had formerly been used for smelting ore from Broken Hill. Burford's developed a pioneering "garden suburb" for its employees, designed by W. J. Earle, who also laid out the model town for Cadbury at Claremont, Tasmania. The Burford Gardens name has vanished, but its streets remain: Flame Avenue, Gum Avenue, Wattle Avenue, Grevillea Avenue and Bushwood Avenue.

The buildings of the former Dry Creek explosives depot, now State heritage listed, are sited on Magazine Road, between the Salisbury Highway South Road Connector and the salt pans.

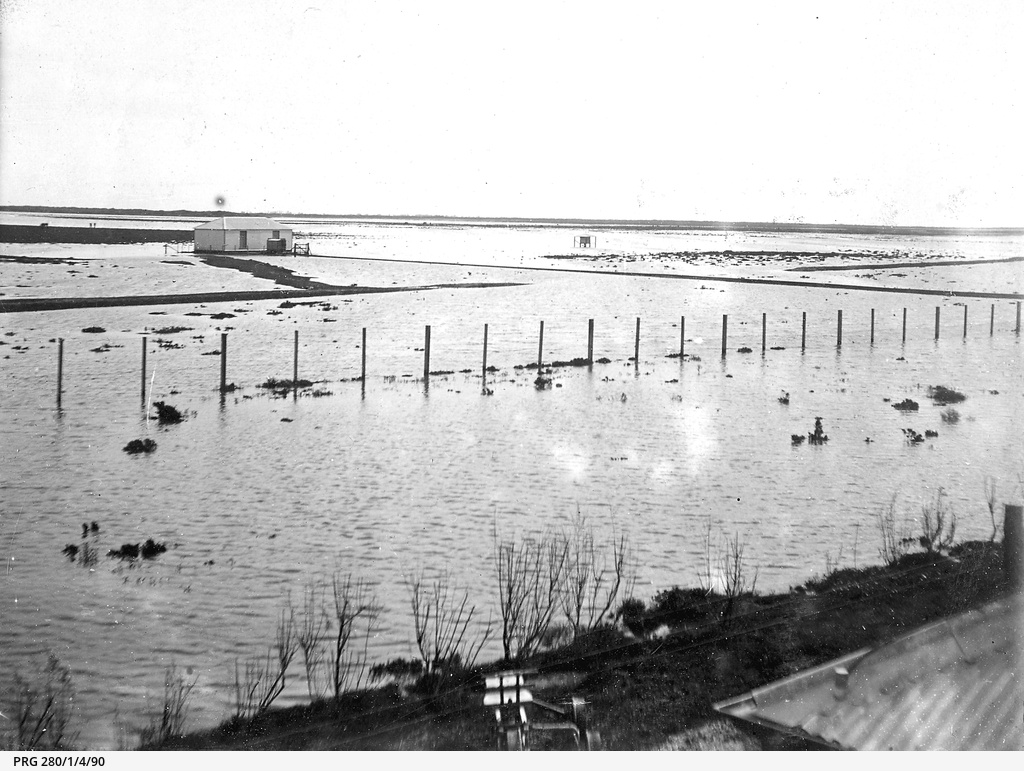
Flooded Dry Creek explosives depot, 1908

== Wetlands ==
The Dry Creek wetlands comprise many separate sections, running from the eastern edge of the suburb to the sea outlet of Dry Creek. They form part of the storm water management system for the City of Salisbury and the City of Port Adelaide Enfield and are connected to numerous drains that run across the Adelaide Plains, including Dry Creek itself. Some of the wetlands have been extensively landscaped but have only limited public access.

The wetlands form a fauna and flora haven with one of the southern-most mangrove habitats in the world, extensive reed and samphire beds, and a large bird and fish population. They discharge via North Arm creek into the Barker Inlet of Gulf St Vincent. The wetlands are part of the Gulf St Vincent Important Bird Area.

== Transport ==
The Port River Expressway traverses Dry Creek east–west, and the North–South Motorway provides a north–south route through the suburb.

Dry Creek railway station is located on the Gawler railway line. The Northfield railway line, which branched eastwards from Dry Creek station, was closed in 1987.

=== Dry Creek rail maintenance depot ===
Australian National maintained a motive power and maintenance depot at Dry Creek. Between 1982 and 1986, the depot was the site of a bogie exchange facility, which was used to overcome a break of gauge between the newly standardised Adelaide to Crystal Brook line and the South Australian broad gauge rail network. The depot is now run by rail operator Aurizon.

In February 2011, Adelaide Metro opened a railcar maintenance and re-fuelling depot to the east of Dry Creek station, which replaced a facility near Adelaide station. The depot had the capacity to store 70 railcars on more than 11 kilometres of tracks. After the Gawler line was electrified in 2022, the suburban electric train fleet gained access to the depot.

== See also ==
- Northern Connector
