= Northfield, South Australia =

Coordinates: 34°51′S 138°37′E

Northfield
- Suburb
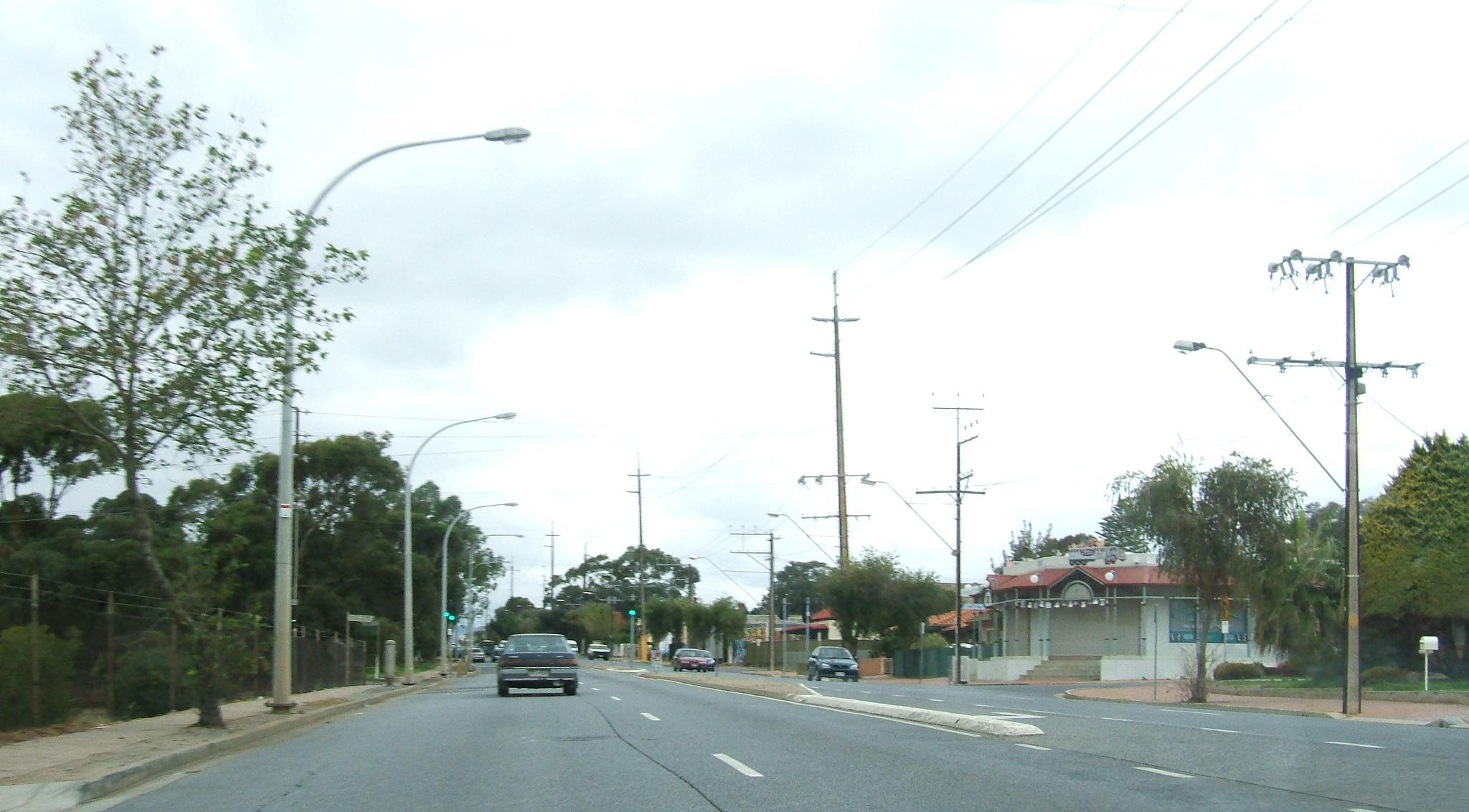
- Grand Junction Road, Northfield
- Interactive map of Northfield
- Country: Australia
- State: South Australia
- City: Adelaide
- LGA: City of Port Adelaide Enfield

Government
  - State electorates: Enfield; Florey
  - Federal divisions: Adelaide; Makin

Area
  - Total: 2.2 km^{2} (0.85 sq mi)

Population
  - Total: 5,043 (SAL 2021)
- Postcode: 5085

Northfield is a suburb of the greater Adelaide, South Australia area.

== History ==
The earliest known record of the name "Northfield" being used in reference to the area is 1852. This was a newspaper entry in the South Australia Register 4 October 1852 on the marriage notice of John Lewis to Harriet Ricketts of Northfield. Northfield was known as "Northfield, Dry Creek" as early as 1855 and the Free Labour stone quarry worked by Convicts at that time was later to become the Prison Quarry.

The suburb was serviced by the former Northfield railway line and Northfield railway station from the opening of the line in 1857, until its closure to passenger traffic on 29 May 1987. The former terminus of the line, Stockade railway station, which was closed in 1961, was built to load stone from the quarries behind Female Labour Prison (which was originally called The Stockade - a name which survives in the local park of the same name). Sections of Northfield were renamed Northgate and Lightsview in later years.

== Landmarks ==
- Hampstead rehabilitation centre, part of the Royal Adelaide Hospital
- Landing ground of Ross Smith & Keith Smith's Vickers Vimy, 23 March 1920
- Ross Smith Secondary School (formerly Northfield High School) - Closed in 2011
- Stockade Botanical Park
- Yatala Labour Prison, built in 1854.
- Northfield Primary School, established in 1861.
- Duncan Fraser Reserve, home of the Gepps Cross Football Club
- LJ Lewis Reserve, home of the Greenacres Football Club

== Government ==
Northfield is in the City of Port Adelaide Enfield local government area, and is in both the South Australian House of Assembly electoral districts of Florey and Enfield. It is also in both the Australian House of Representatives Divisions of Adelaide and Makin.
