= Hundred of Para Wirra =

Para Wirra
- Cadastral division
- Coordinates: 34.735°S 138.902°E
- Country: Australia
- State: South Australia
- Region: Adelaide Hills
- Established: 29 October 1846

Area
  - Total: 265 km^{2} (102.5 sq mi)
- County: Adelaide
Lands administrative divisions around Para Wirra
Munno Para	Barossa	Moorooroo
Yatala	Para Wirra	Jutland
Onkaparinga	Talunga	Talunga

The Hundred of Para Wirra is a cadastral hundred of the County of Adelaide, South Australia, spanning a portion of the Adelaide Hills north of the Torrens Valley including Mount Crawford.

== Location ==
The hundred spans a large number of Adelaide Hills localities but is dominated by Kersbrook in the west and Mount Crawford in the east, with the Mount Gould Range forming a natural boundary between the two.

In the west of the hundred are the towns of Inglewood (most part) and localities of Humbug Scrub, Sampson Flat (most part), Millbrook (and Millbrook Reservoir) and Chain of Ponds (most part). Other towns and localities crossing the hundred boundary in the west include Yattalunga (eastern half), Lower Hermitage (east half) and Paracombe (eastern portion). Other towns and localities crossing the hundred boundary in the east include Forreston (north west portion), Cromer (northern half), Mount Pleasant, (north west portion) and Flaxman Valley (west portion).

== History ==
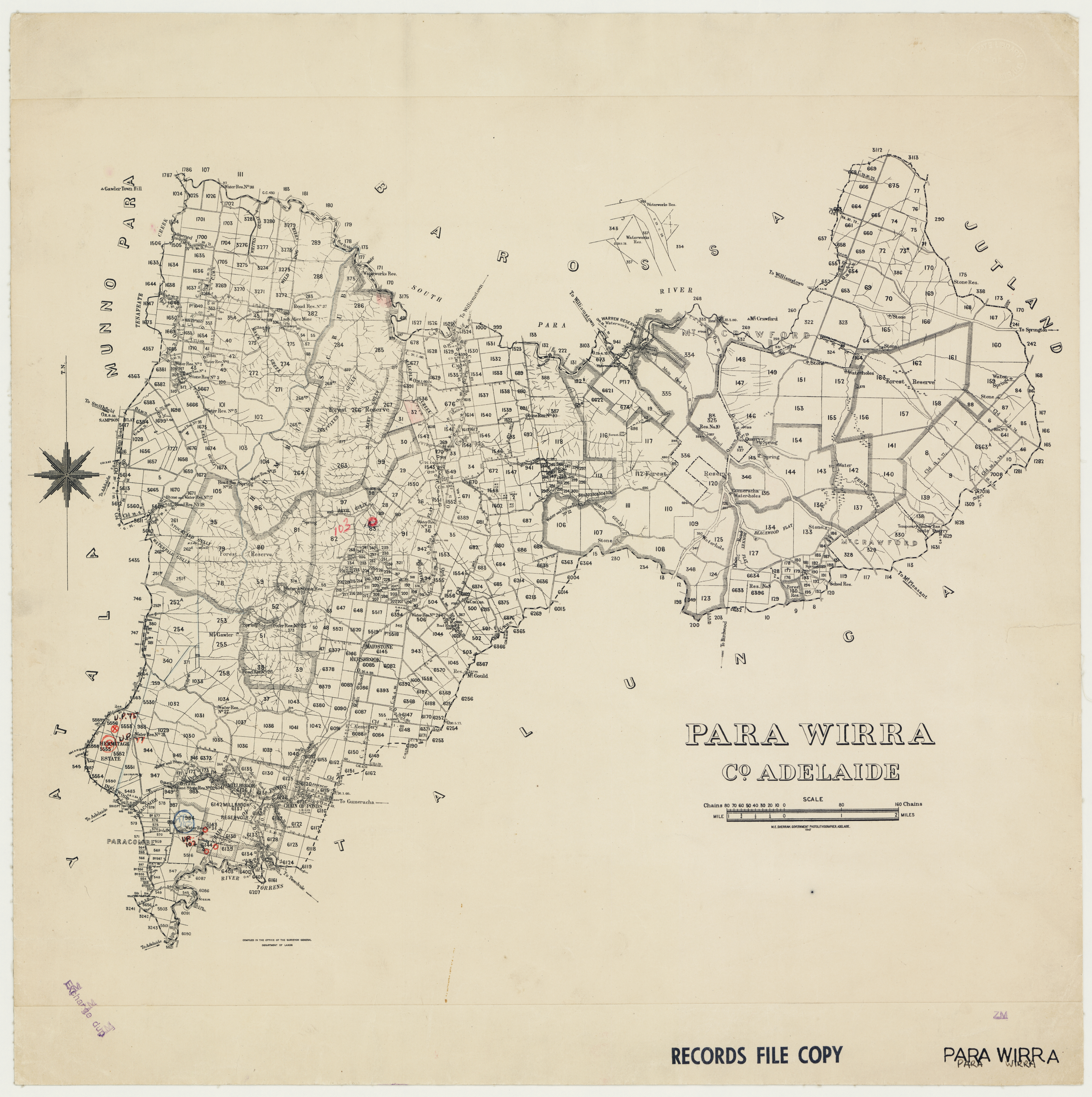
Plan of the Hundred of Para Wirra, 1947

The hundred was proclaimed by Governor Frederick Robe in 1846 and named for an indigenous compound term meaning 'river forest' (compare: Karra wirra-parri).

The first local government within the hundred were the District Council of Para Wirra, seated at Kersbrook, and District Council of Mount Crawford. The councils were established on the same day in 1854 to administer, respectively, the western and eastern halves of the hundred, with the Mount Crawford council area extending into the neighbouring Hundred of Barossa and slightly east outside the County of Adelaide boundaries.

Para Wirra and Mount Crawford councils were both dissolved in 1935 and the hundred, from this time until 1997, was governed by the new District Council of Gumeracha.

In 1997, Gumeracha was amalgamated with East Torrens, Onkaparinga, and Stirling councils to form the much larger Adelaide Hills Council.

In 1962 the Para Wirra National Park was proclaimed in the northwest of the hundred. It was reconstituted as a recreation park in 1972, but was upgraded to Conservation Park status in 2015 and the recreation park status was abolished.

In 1966, the Warren Conservation Park was created in the middle of the hundred on the northern slopes of Mount Gould Range.
