= Frederick Henry Handcock =

Australian pastoralist

Frederick Henry Handcock (c. 1815 – 28 November 1847) was a notable pioneering pastoralist, horse racing enthusiast, and overlander of South Australia.

== Origins ==
Born c. 1815 at Athlone, in County Westmeath, Ireland, Fred Handcock was a member of the landowning Handcock family associated with the peerage of Baron Castlemaine, whose ancestral seat was Moydrum Castle. Attracted to the possibilities for pastoralism and land speculation in the nascent colony of South Australia, he arrived there in July 1837 as a young unmarried man in the Africaine from Launceston in Van Diemen's Land.

== South Australian pioneer ==
Handcock was the original grantee of Adelaide Town Acre 629 on the southern side of Gilbert Street. Quickly recognised as a leading citizen of the new colony, although never holding public office, in December 1837 Handcock participated in the expedition of Colonel Light that discovered and named the Barossa Range, ergo the Barossa Valley. A few weeks later, on 1 and 2 January 1838, Handcock's brown mare Taglioni raced at the first horse racing event held in South Australia.

In early 1838, in partnership with James Fisher, son of James Hurtle Fisher, Handcock established one of the earliest sheep runs outside Adelaide, known as Fisher and Handcock's Station, on the Little Para River near its junction with Gould Creek. In January 1839 Colonel Light painted a watercolour of their rustic homestead, now in the collection of the Art Gallery of South Australia, titled Fisher & Handcocks Station. Hancock Hill near Yatala Vale bears Handcock's name from this time (although misspelt).

== Horse racing and sporting life ==
Soon thereafter Handcock became a close friend of the Jones brothers, Henry and Frederick, but particularly younger brother Fred Jones. The brothers, sons of a wealthy London oil merchant, were merchants and stockholders at Adelaide. He also befriended John Hill, explorer and stockholder. All shared an avid interest in horse racing, being prominent pioneers of this sport in South Australia. They were part of a small band of urbane young bachelor colonists who in 1838 were among the foundation members of the South Australian Club, precursor to the Adelaide Club. In August 1838, riding his grey gelding Charley, Handcock won the first steeplechase event ever held in South Australia.

== Overlander and pioneer pastoralist at Chowilla ==
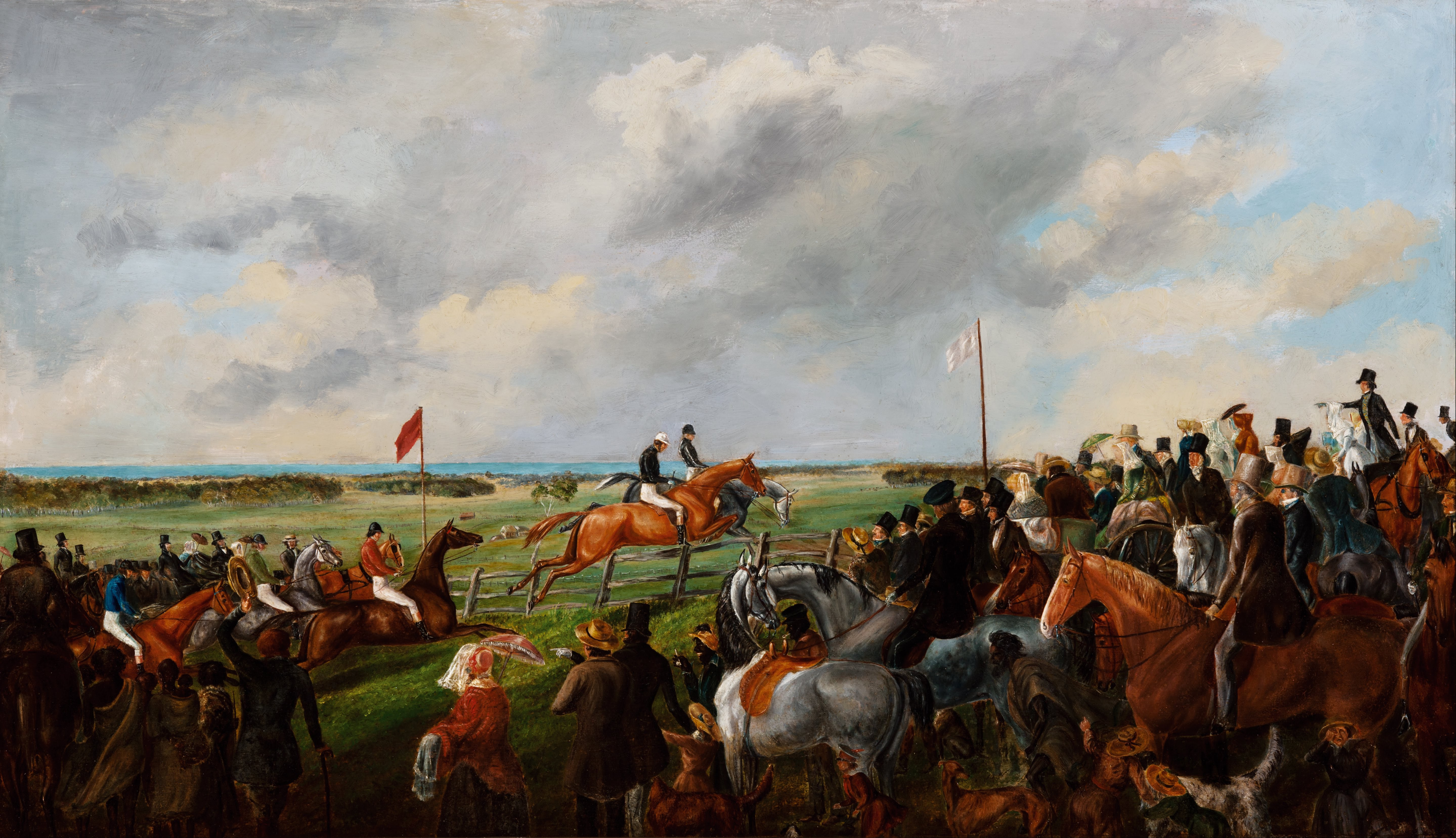
Handcock in second place, 'first' steeplechase in SA, 1846.

Handcock was subsequently involved in various pioneering pastoralist ventures in rural South Australia, his surname frequently appearing in newspaper reports (often misspelt as Hancock). In early 1846 these activities eventuated in Handcock, Fisher, and Fred Jones travelling to New South Wales in the ship Templar to purchase a large herd of cattle and horses. Droving this livestock overland, they settled on the Chowilla floodplain of the Murray River, being the first pastoralist pioneers of the Riverland region straddling the South Australia – New South Wales border near Renmark. Due to livestock theft by local Aboriginal people, Handcock asked the South Australian Chief Secretary for police protection for his stations on the Murray near the inter-colonial boundary. The following year, 1847, he suggested to the same agency that flour and blankets should be issued to Aboriginals near the Rufus River.

Visiting Adelaide in September 1846, Jones, Fisher, and Handcock all participated in an exciting 'Grand Steeple Chase', viewed by some 1,000 spectators. Handcock, in second place, riding Jones' red gelding Highflyer, is depicted in a painting of this event by George Hamilton, titled The first steeplechase in South Australia, 25 September 1846, held by the Art Gallery of South Australia. The painting is incorrectly titled because the 'first' steeplechase had taken place eight years earlier, Handcock having competed in both events.

== Accidental death ==
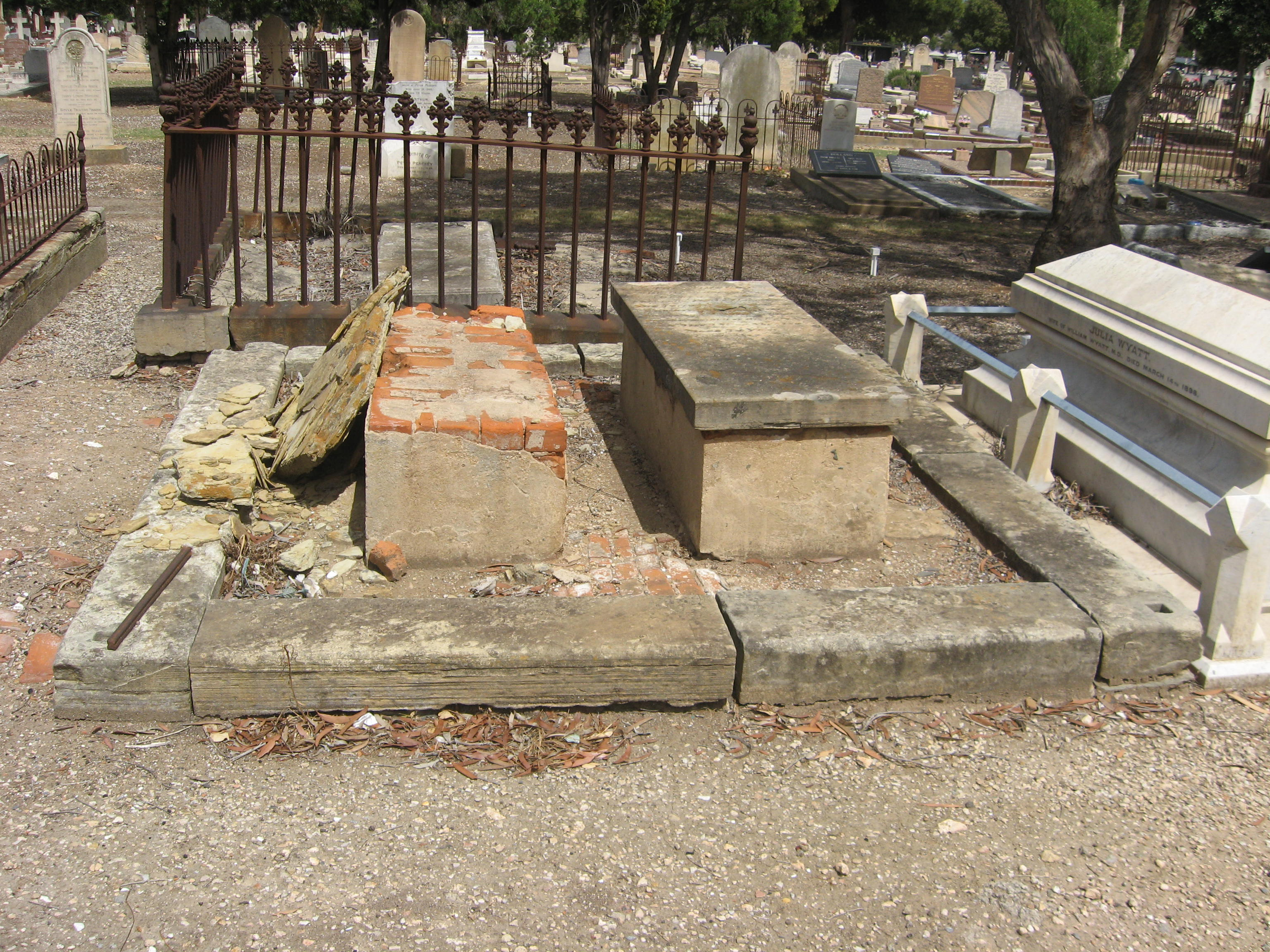
Conjoined graves of Bailey (L) and Handcock (R), West Terrace Cemetery, Adelaide

In November 1847 a neighbouring pastoralist, Thomas Frederick Bailey (Baily), aged 25, based near Lake Victoria, went missing and so Handcock, then aged 31, went out searching for him. Both were found dead at Limbra Creek. Bailey had apparently fallen while crossing the flooded creek and had been struck on the head from a horse hoof. Handcock, an expert horseman but a non-swimmer, had drowned nearby while crossing on horseback to reach Bailey's body. Their bodies, encased in expensive lead coffins, were ritually returned to Adelaide for burial, escorted by fellow pastoralists James Fisher and 'Ned' Bagot, son of C. H. Bagot. Curiously, their joint funeral was then postponed for over a year, eventually taking place on 7 December 1848 at West Terrace Cemetery, the pair being interred in the same vault.

The disheartened Jones abandoned the frontier station soon after these deaths. It was subsequently taken up by pastoralist John Chambers, while Ned Bagot established his Neds Corner Station nearby.

== Legacies ==
Hancock Creek, South Australia, which feeds Lake Limbra, bears Handcock's name (misspelt), as does a sand dune prominence beside the Murray River overlooking a property now known as Wompinni Station, now named Hancock Hill, New South Wales, and formerly named Mount Hancock (also misspelt). Although only a few kilometres apart, these two geographical features are divided by the SA/NSW State border.

The debonair Handcock, who had never married, had a ‘charming and high-spirited’ character, bringing vibrancy and stimulation to the otherwise dour task of colonisation, especially through such diversions as horse racing. These attributes rendered him so 'highly respectable' and well liked by his fellow colonists, particularly those connected to the peerage of Ireland, that his unexpected death flung a gloom over Adelaide, prompting glowing public eulogies.
