= Lower Hermitage =

Lower Hermitage South Australia
- Coordinates: 34°48′36″S 138°45′58″E
- Population: 195 (SAL 2021)
- Postcode(s): 5131
- LGA(s): Adelaide Hills Council
- State electorate(s): Newland
- Federal division(s): Mayo
Localities around Lower Hermitage:
Gould Creek	Sampson Flat
Upper Hermitage	Lower Hermitage	Inglewood
Tea Tree Gully	Houghton

Lower Hermitage is a locality in the Adelaide Hills region, located approximately 20 kilometres (12 mi) northeast of Adelaide in South Australia. It is aligned north–south along Lower Hermitage Road.

As at 2016 census, Lower Hermitage had a population of 209 people.

The heritage-listed Glen Ewin complex including a house and former jam factory buildings (pulping shed, jam factory, sugar store, packing shed and jam kitchen) is situated in the area surrounding the locality.
