= Bolivar, South Australia =

Bolivar
- Suburb
- Coordinates: 34°46′30″S 138°35′20″E
- Country: Australia
- State: South Australia
- City: Adelaide
- LGA: City of Salisbury
- Location: 17 km (11 mi) N of Adelaide city centre
- Established: 1956

Government
  - State electorate: Taylor
  - Federal division: Spence

Population
  - Total: 357 (SAL 2021)
- Postcode: 5110
Suburbs around Bolivar
St Kilda	Waterloo Corner	Paralowie
St Kilda	Bolivar	Paralowie
Gulf St Vincent	Globe Derby Park	Globe Derby Park

Bolivar (pronounced /ˈbɒləvɑː/) is an outer northern suburb of Adelaide, South Australia. It is located in the City of Salisbury.

== History ==
Bolivar was a barque built in 1826 in Monmouth by shipbuilder William Lambert. Measuring 108 feet 6 inches in length, 28 feet 2 inches in beam, and 19 feet 10 inches in depth, the vessel had a tonnage of 386, and was registered in London under the ownership of Fenwick. One of the notable voyages of Bolivar occurred in 1849-1850 under the command of Captain William Murray. The ship departed from London and Plymouth on Thursday, 4 October 1849, bound for Port Adelaide. After nearly four months at sea, Bolivar arrived at its destination on Monday, 28 January 1850. This journey was part of a series of voyages that connected the United Kingdom to Australia, facilitating the transportation of passengers and goods during the mid-19th century. Bolivar had previously completed other significant journeys, including a voyage to Hobart Town in 1846. Over its years of service, the ship played a role in the maritime history of the United Kingdom and Australia.

The suburb was established in 1956, and was named after the General Bolivar Hotel, which had been built by Walter Walpole, a settler who had arrived in South Australia in 1850 on Bolivar. According to Ronald Praite, Bolivar, South Australia, took its name from the old General Bolivar Hotel, taken from the sailing ship Bolivar that may have been named after Simón Bolívar, a Venezuelan soldier who led the revolutions against Spanish rule and liberated several South American countries from the Spanish empire. Simon Bolivar was also known as the Liberator.

The Bolivar Post Office in the then rural area opened on 1 July 1905 and closed in 1930.

On 13 & 17 March 1910, the first flights in Australia were carried out in Bolivar. The aircraft in operation resembled the Bleriot monoplane that Bleriot famously flew during the historic 1909 crossing from France to England, marking a significant milestone in aviation history.

On 27 June 1967, a historical plaque and mosaic was strategically placed in a prominent location by the City of Salisbury on the corner of Victoria Dr and Port Wakefield Rd, carefully chosen to commemorate the significant event that occurred on 13 March 1910, known as the Wittber hop.

== Geography ==
Bolivar lies beside Barker Inlet and is bounded on the south by the Little Para River and on the east by Port Wakefield Road.

On 30 October 2025, part of Bolivar was transferred to the neighbouring suburb of Paralowie, by notice of the South Australian Government Gazette.

== Demographics ==
The 2006 Census by the Australian Bureau of Statistics counted 119 persons in Bolivar on census night. Of these, 63.9% were male and 36.1% were female.

The majority of residents (69.7%) are of Australian birth, with an additional 13.4% claiming England as their country of birth.

The age distribution of Bolivar residents is skewed towards an older population compared to the greater Australian population: 94.1% of residents were over 25 years in 2006, compared to the Australian average of 66.5%.

== Facilities and attractions ==
=== Waste water treatment plant ===
The suburb is best known as the location of the Bolivar Waste Water Treatment Plant. Bolivar is the largest of three SA Water sewage treatment plants in metropolitan Adelaide and the largest in South Australia. It produces recycled water which is provided to farmers on the Adelaide Plains near Virginia. Methane is collected and used to generate electricity. Bolivar produces 35,000 tonnes of biosolids which have been supplied to farmers since the 1960s. Bolivar processes 60% of metropolitan Adelaide's raw sewage. The biogas produced in the treatment process is used to generate 85% of the facility's annual electricity requirements. Twenty-five gigawatt-hours of electricity is generated by the natural gas-powered reciprocating engines each year. It treats 135 million litres of water per day. Water from the northwestern suburbs is treated separately as it tends to be more saline and not suitable for reuse in irrigation. Waste water that is not used for irrigation of market gardens or reticulation at Mawson Lakes is discharged via an open outfall channel 11 km long near St Kilda at the northern end of the Barker Inlet. Water to be reused passes through an additional Dissolved Air Flotation and Filtration (DAFF) plant commissioned in 1999, and Mawson Lakes reticulated water also receives additional chlorination. The High Salinity Waste Water Treatment Plant is on the Bolivar site, but otherwise a separate facility that replaced a facility at Port Adelaide in 2005. There is a dedicated pumped trunk sewer delivering the raw sewage from the former site to Bolivar. it is 17 km long with a diameter of 900mm.

Bolivar's treated wastewater contains pollutants that enter the Port River estuary. In 2018-19 the most significant pollutants discharged to the marine environment were (by mass): nitrogen (320 tonnes), phosphorus (81 tonnes), fluoride (26 tonnes), boron (19 tonnes), ammonia (12 tonnes) and zinc (2.2 tonnes).

The South Australian Museum has a dedicated facility adjacent to the wastewater treatment plant that is used for the preparation of large specimens, such as whale skeletons.

=== Parks ===
The southern boundary of the suburb runs along the Little Para River and includes greenspace and a shared path along the river.

== Transportation ==
=== Rail ===
The Adelaide-Port Augusta railway line had a station named Bolivar, which was north of where the Northern Expressway now crosses the railway (and several kilometres from Bolivar). There is still a crossing loop in the vicinity.

=== Roads ===
Bolivar is serviced by Port Wakefield Road, part of the National Highway, and the North–South Motorway, Adelaide's under construction major north–south road route.

=== Air ===
On 13 March 1910 during taxiing test by Mr. Wittber the plane (a Bleriot monoplane) became unexpectedly airborne in a hop caused by a gust of wind known as the Wittber hop, four days later Frederic Custance made Australia's first monoplane flight on 17 March 1910 in a paddock at Bolivar, South Australia.

In the depicted scene, the City of Salisbury celebrates its heritage with a plaque and mosaic commemorating the Wittber Hop, highlighting the achievements of Australia's first pioneering flights.

== See also ==
- List of Adelaide suburbs
- Gulf St Vincent Important Bird Area
