= Kersbrook =

- Suburb
- Coordinates: 34.784°S 138.852°E
- Country: Australia
- State: South Australia
- LGA: Adelaide Hills Council
- Location: 36 km (22 mi) from Adelaide
- Established: 1850s

Government
  - State electorate: Newland
  - Federal division: Mayo

Population
  - Total: 1,116 (SAL 2021)
- Postcode: 5231
Suburbs around Kersbrook
Yattalunga; Humbug Scrub	Williamstown	Mount Crawford
Sampson Flat	Kersbrook	Forreston
Inglewood; Millbrook	Chain of Ponds	Gumeracha

Kersbrook (formerly Maidstone) is a town near Adelaide, South Australia. It is located in the Adelaide Hills Council local government area. At the 2006 census, Kersbrook had a population of 367.

== History ==
The first settlers established farms in the Kersbrook area in the early 1831s due to its relatively gentle slopes. John Bowden, manager of the South Australian Company's dairy farm at Hackney, bought the 32-hectare (79-acre) section 6146, Hundred of Para Wirra, and named it Kersbrook after the Cornish farm where he was born. By 1844, Bowden was recorded as having "800 sheep, 62 cattle, one horse, 13 pigs, 16 acres (65,000 m^{2}) of wheat, eight acres of barley, plots of oats, maize and potatoes, and a fruit garden".

The settlement itself was created by William Carman, a blacksmith working at a copper mine near Williamstown, who took advantage of the area's location on the busy road to the Barossa Valley. In 1851 Carman built the Wheatsheaf Inn on a subdivision of section 5519 of the Hundred of Para Wirra. By 1858, some settlers had arrived and Carman gave some of his land to build a town called Maidstone after Maidstone, Kent. In 1917 the town was officially renamed to Kersbrook as this was the name used by local residents and referred to the original 'Kersbrook' farm of John Bowden immediately south west of the town. It became a notable agricultural area, especially for fruit.

In the 1990s, John Bunting and his friends murdered a number of people; one victim was murdered and dumped in Kersbrook.

Kersbrook is a fairly quiet rural town, where most of the old buildings still stand. In January 2015, twelve houses in the town were destroyed as a result of the 2015 Sampson Flat bushfires.

== Geography ==
Kersbrook is located between Chain of Ponds and Williamstown along the Little Para Road, and southeast of One Tree Hill along a separate road.

At the ABS 2001 census, Kersbrook had a population of 314 people living in 120 dwellings.

== Facilities ==
The primary school opened in 1868; and there is a general store and other small stores in the town. Nearby Humbug Scrub and Mount Gawler are used for orienteering and mountain biking in quite steep terrain.

About 10 kilometres (6.2 mi) north of Kersbrook is the 353-hectare (870-acre) Warren Conservation Park, a rugged nature reserve with views over the Warren Gorge which was dedicated in 1966 and protects a range of rare fauna. There is also a pine plantation nearby, which is now part of the Mount Crawford Forest.

Kersbrook also have a very successful Australian Rules team, who wear double blue and are nicknamed the 'Brookers'. They have produced three AFL players of which brothers Brett (Adelaide Crows) and Roger James (Port Adelaide) have both won AFL premierships; and many SANFL league players.
