= Globe Derby Park, South Australia =

Globe Derby Park
- Suburb
- Coordinates: 34.788°S 138.59°E
- Country: Australia
- State: South Australia
- City: Adelaide
- LGA: City of Salisbury
- Location: 15 km (9.3 mi) N of Adelaide CBD
- Established: 1998

Government
  - State electorate: Taylor
  - Federal division: Makin

Population
  - Total: 360 (SAL 2021)
- Postcode: 5110
Suburbs around Globe Derby Park
Bolivar	Bolivar	Paralowie
Gulf St Vincent	Globe Derby Park	Parafield Gardens, Green Fields
Dry Creek	Dry Creek	Mawson Lakes

Globe Derby Park (pronounced /ˈdɑːbi/) is a suburb of Adelaide, South Australia. It is located in the City of Salisbury.

== Demographics ==
The 2021 Census by the Australian Bureau of Statistics counted 604 persons in Globe Derby Park on census night. Of these, 48.3% were male and 51.7% were female.

A large majority of residents (82.5%) are of Australian birth, with another common census response being England (2.2%).

The age distribution of Globe Derby Park residents is skewed towards an older population compared to the greater Australian population. 71.9% of residents were over 25 years in 2021, compared to the Australian average of 69.8%; and 27.9% were younger than 25 years, compared to the Australian average of 30.1%.

== Attractions ==
The suburb is most notable for the Globe Derby Park harness racing venue after which it was named. The suburb was created in 1998, renaming the southern part of the suburb of Bolivar.

=== Parks ===
The Little Para River is on the suburb's northern boundary, with a sealed cycling and walking trail that passes under Port Wakefield Road. The Whites Road Wetland is in Globe Derby Park adjacent to the river and path.

Dry Creek is on the southern boundary of Globe Derby Park. The Little Para Trail loops round the western side of the suburb and joins the Dry Creek linear trail.

== Transport ==
The suburb is serviced by the following main roads:

- Port Wakefield Road, part of the National Highway.

== See also ==
- List of Adelaide suburbs
