= Bowman's Bus Services =

Former Australian bus company

- Parent: Jack Bowman; Milton Bowman
- Commenced operation: April 1935
- Ceased operation: 23 February 1974
- Headquarters: St Agnes
- Service area: Adelaide
- Service type: Bus operator
- Depots: 1
- Fleet: 42 (February 1974)]

Bowman's Bus Services was an Australian bus company in Adelaide.

== History ==
In April 1935, David Bowman commenced operating a weekly bus service from Hope Valley to the Adelaide central business district via Peserverance Road. The service quickly expanded to become twice daily. From circa 1937, a second service commenced from Tea Tree Gully to One Tree Hill.

A second service from Tea Tree Gully to Adelaide via North East Road later commenced. Following David Bowman's passing in 1967, it passed to his sons, Jack and Milton.

By the early 1970s, Bowman's had expanded to operate nine routes:

- 540: One Tree Hill to Adelaide central business district
- 541: Fairview Park to Adelaide central business district
- 542: Tea Tree Gully to Adelaide central business district
- 543: Redwood Park to Adelaide central business district
- 544: Westfield Tea Tree Plaza to Modbury Heights
- 550: St Agnes to Adelaide central business district
- 551: St Agnes to Adelaide central business district
- 560: Tea Tree Gully to Elizabeth
- 561: Tea Tree Gully to Salisbury

In early 1974, Bowman's became an AAT Kings contractor.

With falling revenues and rising costs, on 11 February 1974 the routes of Bowman's, along with those of 11 other operators, were taken over by the Municipal Tramways Trust.

== Fleet ==
Up until the late 1950s, the fleet had primarily consisted of front-engined Fords. In 1959, the first of 15 Commers was delivered. These were followed by Bedford SBs and Hino RC320Ps. When operations ceased in February 1974, the fleet consisted of 36 buses and six coaches. All passed to the Municipal Tramways Trust.

== Depots ==
In 1970, Bowman's opened a new all under cover depot on 3.25 acres on the corner of North East and Tolley roads, St Agnes replacing depots in Hope Valley and North Adelaide. Having been rebuilt in 1980 and 1989, the depot remains in use with Torrens Transit.
