= Sampson Flat =

- Suburb
- Coordinates: 34.75°S 138.79°E
- Country: Australia
- State: South Australia
- City: Adelaide
- LGA: City of Playford
- Location: 30 km (19 mi) NE of Adelaide city centre; 12 km (7.5 mi) NE of Golden Grove; 4 km (2.5 mi) SE of One Tree Hill

Government
  - State electorate: Newland
  - Federal division: Spence

Population
  - Total: 147 (SAL 2021)
- Postcode: 5114
Suburbs around Sampson Flat
One Tree Hill	Yattalunga	Humbug Scrub
Gould Creek	Sampson Flat	Kersbrook
Upper Hermitage	Lower Hermitage	Inglewood

Sampson Flat is a locality northeast of Adelaide, South Australia in the City of Playford. It used to be known as Sampson's Flat. The area drains to the west into the Little Para Reservoir. It is a mixture of open pasture with scattered trees, and denser scrub on the higher eastern side.

Sampson Flat was possibly named after John H. Sampson, who arrived in South Australia in 1849 and resided at One Tree Hill.

== Demographics ==
The 2016 Australian census by the Australian Bureau of Statistics counted 124 persons in Sampson Flat on census night. Of these, 52.1% were male and 47.9% were female. The median age was 47 years and the average number of people per household was 2.6

== Fires ==
Sampson Flat was the site of first ignition for a bushfire in the Adelaide Hills in January 2015.
