= Castambul =

- Suburb
- Coordinates: 34°52′0″S 138°45′0″E
- Country: Australia
- State: South Australia
- City: Adelaide
- LGA: Adelaide Hills Council
- Location: 20 km (12 mi) from Adelaide

Government
  - State electorate: Morialta
  - Federal division: Mayo
- Elevation: 151 m (495 ft)

Population
  - Total: 18 (SAL 2021)
- Postcode: 5076
Suburbs around Castambul
	Paracombe	Cudlee Creek
	Castambul
Montacute

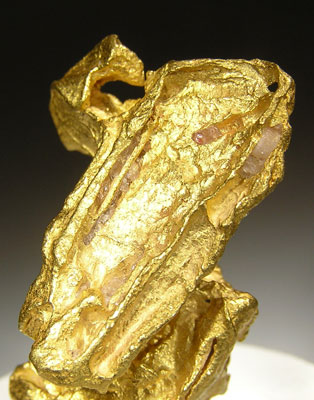
Gold specimen from the old Victoria gold mine.

Castambul is a small locality near Adelaide, South Australia. It is located in the Adelaide Hills Council local government area.

== History ==
Castambul was originally named Sixth Creek, but was renamed Castambul by Price Maurice after the Kastamonu (previously Kastambul) region in the Black Sea area of Turkey.

In the 1850s, Australia's first payable gold mine (the Victoria) was located in the area. The area was also home to Price Maurice, who moved to Castambul in 1856 and bred Angora goats for wool. Angora goats were introduced from Turkey to South Australia by John Haigh, who bred them near Port Lincoln. After purchasing Haigh's flock, Maurice was impressed with their potential and soon sent to Turkey for additional animals. His enterprises in South Australia were very successful but he returned to Britain with his family in 1862 for health reasons.

Kastambul Post Office opened on an unknown date and closed at the end of 1971.

Today, very little exists of the old settlement.

In 1966, work started on the Kangaroo Creek Reservoir, a dam of the River Torrens, and in 1969, it was completed at a cost of $5.3 million. Apart from supplying water to eastern Adelaide, it also serves a flood protection role and holds 19,160 megalitres.

== Geography ==
Castambul is located east of Montacute on the road out of Adelaide via Athelstone (Gorge Road).

== Facilities ==
Castambul has a CSR calcite quarry and tea gardens, both located on Gorge Road, and the former Victoria Goldmine on Batchelor Road is a heritage-listed site.

== Transport ==
The area is not serviced by Adelaide public transport.
