= Municipal Tramways Trust =

South Australian government transport operator 1906 to 1975

Municipal Tramways Trust, Adelaide
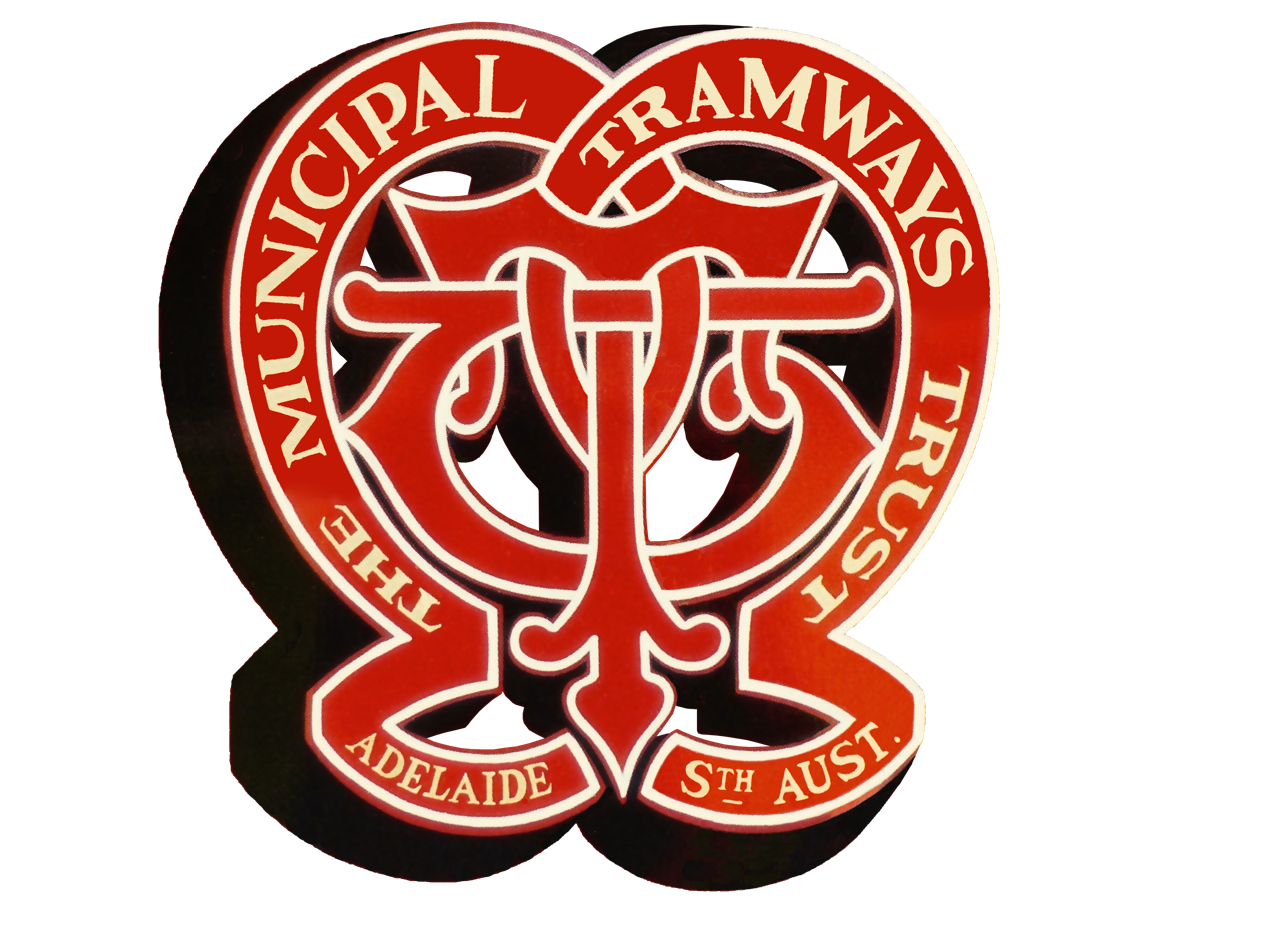
- Type: Body corporate, independent of direct government control
- Industry: Public transportation
- Predecessors: 11 private horse tram companies
- Founded: December 1906; 119 years ago
- Defunct: December 1975
- Fate: Dissolved, 1975
- Successors: State Transport Authority (1974–1994); TransAdelaide (1994–2010); Department of Planning, Transport and Infrastructure branded as Adelaide Metro (since 2010)
- Headquarters: Hackney, Adelaide (34°55′03″S 138°36′47″E), South Australia
- Area served: Metropolitan Adelaide
- Key people: J.J. Bodley (general manager, 1907); William G.T. Goodman (Chief Engineer and general manager conjointly, 1907–1950); J. N. Keynes (general manager, 1950–[?])

The Municipal Tramways Trust (MTT) was established by the Government of South Australia in December 1906 to purchase all of the horse-drawn tramways in Adelaide, South Australia. The Trust subsequently also ran petrol and diesel buses and electric trolleybuses. It ceased to exist on 8 December 1975, when its functions were transferred to the State Transport Authority, which also operated Adelaide's suburban train services.

== History ==
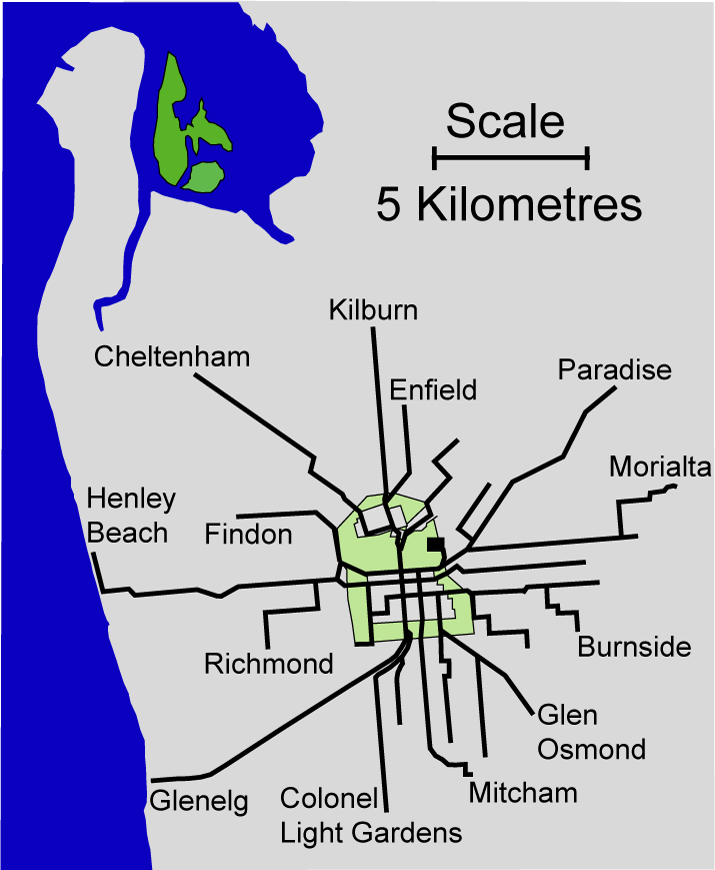
The electric tram network in the late 1950s

The MTT was created in December 1906 as a tax exempt body with eight board members, mostly appointed by local councils and a small number of state government appointees. Board members were appointed for terms of six years with a provision that half the members should retire every three years. (Note: Inaugural MTT board members in 1907 were: AB Moncrieff, Government appointee, chairman and engineer-in-chief; succeeded in 1922 by Edward Bakewell; Thomas Gill, Government appointee; J.R. Baker, Alderman of the Adelaide corporation; Theodore Bruce, Mayor of Adelaide; R. Cruickshank, Mayor of the Corporate Town of St Peters; H. J. Holden, Mayor of the Corporate Town of Kensington and Norwood; J.T. Mellor, Mayor of the District Council of Walkerville; A.C. Sanders, Mayor of the District Council of Prospect)

The Trust set out by purchasing all of the horse-drawn tramways in Adelaide. It established a nine-acre (3.6 hectare) tram depot and headquarters near the corner of Hackney and Botanic Roads.

Thirty-five-year old William Goodman, who had diverse engineering experience in private enterprise and government employment in the UK, New South Wales and New Zealand, was appointed in 1907 as the Trust's first engineer. The following year he was appointed Chief Engineer and general manager. He was knighted in 1932, retiring in 1950 after 42 years' service.

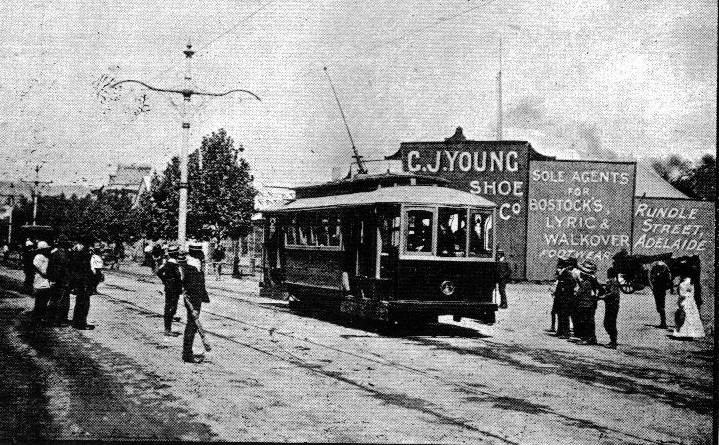
First electric tram trial, Adelaide, November 1908

The MTT's modernisation of tram services started with its first electric tram in March 1909. It also took over the Adelaide to Glenelg railway in 1929, when the line was converted from a steam-hauled broad gauge (5 ft 3 ft in) railway to an electric tramway laid to standard gauge (4 ft 8 1/2 in) in conformity with the rest of the tram network, which had been built in accordance with the General Tramways Act 1884 (SA).

The MTT throughout this period introduced a variety of bus services. In 1938, the Port Adelaide tram service was replaced by double-decker trolleybuses.

From 1952, street tram services were gradually replaced by diesel bus services. After 1958, the mainly off-street Glenelg tram line was the last remaining service. The MTT continued to operate most of the local bus routes in the inner metropolitan area, often following former tram lines. By the 1970s the MTT had bought out many of the private bus operators then operating in the Adelaide suburbs.

On 8 December 1975, the role of the MTT was assumed by the Bus & Tram division of the State Transport Authority. In 1994 the State Transport Authority in turn was dissolved and government public transport services were transferred to TransAdelaide, a publicly owned corporation. A partial tendering of bus services followed. The 2000 round of tenders saw the end of TransAdelaide's direct operation of bus services in its own right, and the Department of Transport, Energy & Infrastructure took control, applying the Adelaide Metro brand across all road passenger transport operators, appearing to the public as a unified network, with common livery, timetable designs and a city information centre.

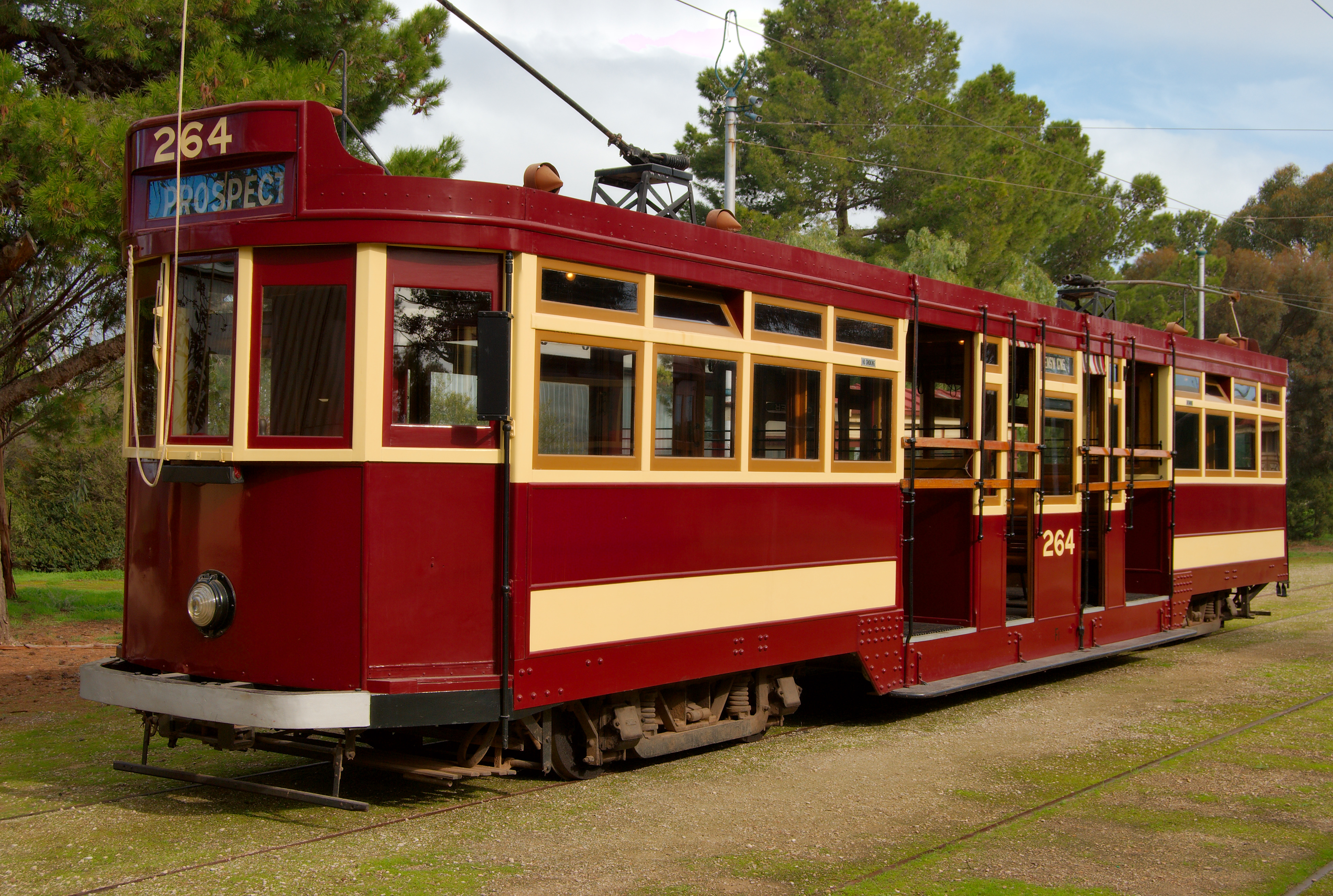
The Type F tram and its variant F1 were the most numerous, at 84, on the MTT's network. Capacity was 60 seated plus 110 standing. Six streams of passengers could board simultaneously. (Shown at the Tramway Museum, St Kilda.)

== Trams ==
Most types of Adelaide trams were introduced and operated by the Municipal Tramways Trust on a network that eventually became almost 100 kilometres (60 miles) long. All the street tram lines were disbanded in 1958, leaving only the 11 km Glenelg tram line, which mostly runs on its own reservation. The Trust and its successor entities continued to operate Type H trams on that line. From 2006, when new trams were purchased, the Type H trams were gradually phased out, except for two kept for special occasions. Many have been preserved; in South Australia four are held by the Tramway Museum, St Kilda, north of Adelaide.

== Tram depots ==
The Hackney tram depot circa 1925

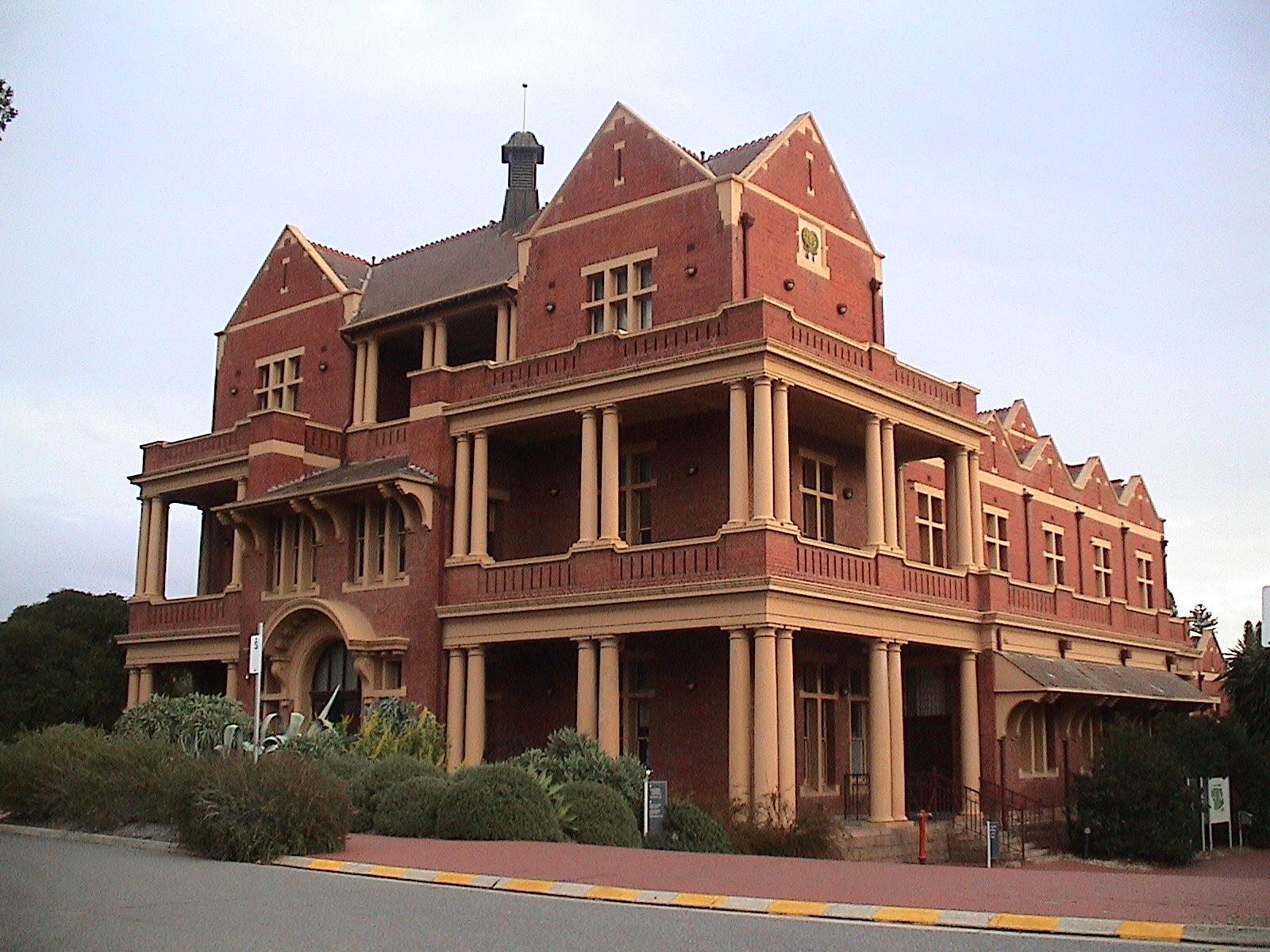
The former MTT headquarters building, now heritage-listed, at Hackney

The MTT operated depots in Angas Street, Hackney, Maylands, Prospect and Port Adelaide.

The MTT also had its headquarters at the Hackney Depot, next to a large tram barn with 24 incoming tracks, housing vehicles and workshops to service them. Part of the original tram barn, and the headquarters building – now used by the State Herbarium of South Australia – remain.

== Buses ==
In 1928, the MTT was given the responsibility for the licensing of private bus operators in Adelaide. Following the cessation of all but the Glenelg Tram in 1958, the MTT had become mainly a bus operator. By the beginning of the 1970s, as revenues dropped, the financial viability of many of Adelaide's private operators had deteriorated. On 1 February 1974, the government rejected a request from the private operators for either increased fares or an increase in subsidies, and announced its intention to phase out all private operation of bus services by 1979 as the licences came up for renewal. The private operators argued they were not prepared to operate the services if they became unprofitable; consequently it was decided that the MTT would take the services over immediately.

On 24 February 1974, the MTT took over the services of 12 operators and the remainder were acquired over the following 15 months. (Note: The 12 bus operators involved were Bowman's Bus Services, Bridgland Passenger Transport Service, Campbell's Bus Service, Choat Passenger Service, Cole Bus Services, Ex-Serviceman's Omnibus Services, Harcourt Gardens Bus Service, Henstridge Bus Service, Morphett's Tours, Slattery's Bus Service, Thomas Tours and Transway Services.) The buses were a motley collection, and in the late 1970s they were replaced by Volvo B59s. At the time of the Trust's demise in December 1975, it operated a fleet of AEC Regal VIs, Leyland Royal Tiger Worldmasters and AEC Swifts.

== Publications ==
Among Ourselves was the MTT's house journal published bi-monthly with the first issue published in May 1946. It continued to be published by the STA until December 1993.
