= AEC Regal VI =

British underfloor-engined single-decker bus chassis

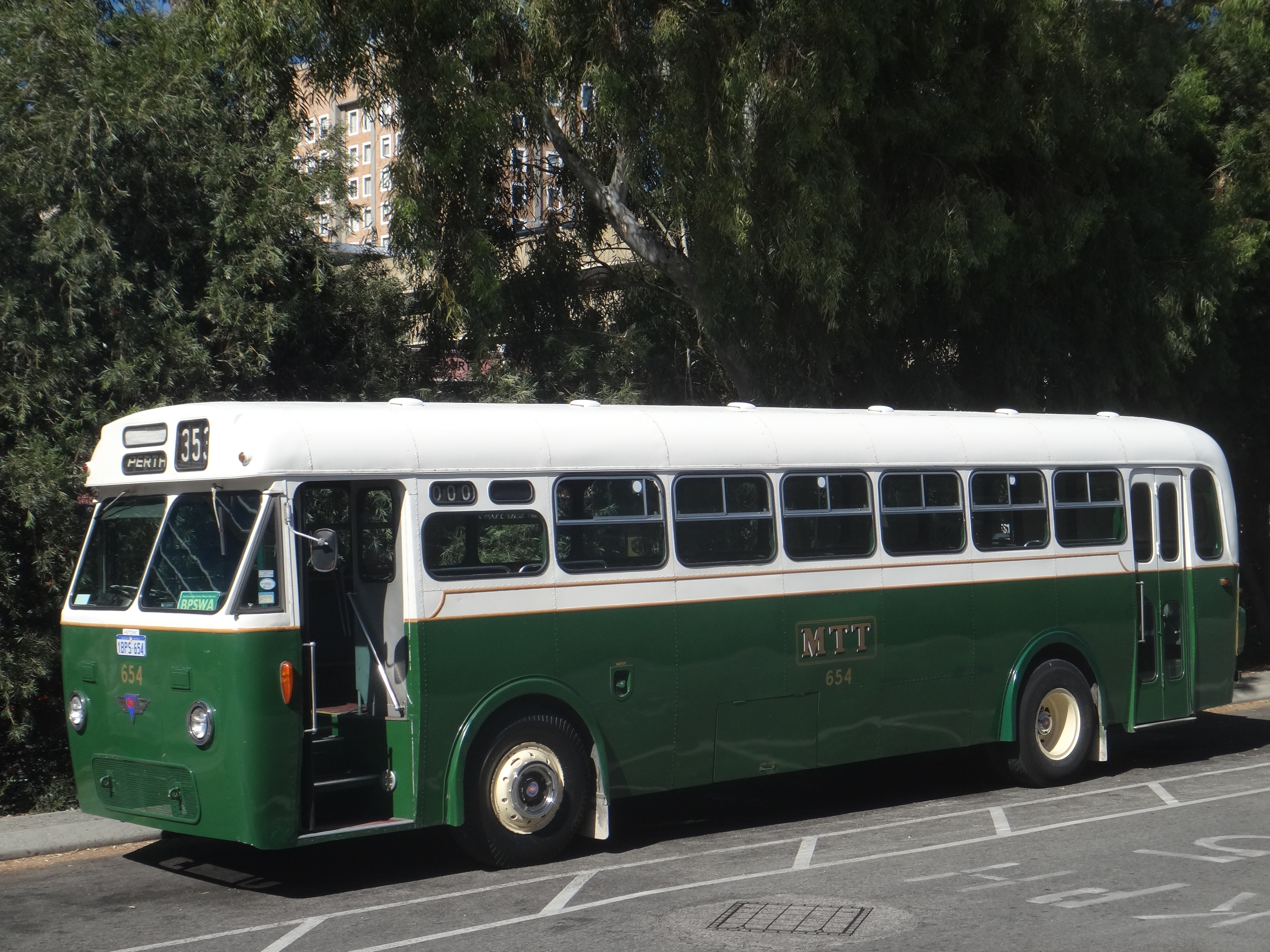
- Preserved Metropolitan Transport Trust, Perth; 1965 AEC Regal VI

Overview
- Manufacturer: AEC
- Production: 1962–1979
- Assembly: Southall, England

Body and chassis
- Doors: 1 or 2
- Floor type: Step entrance

Powertrain
- Engine: AEC AH690
- Capacity: 11.3 litres

Dimensions
- Length: 11.2 metres
- Width: 2.5 metres
- Height: 3.0 metres

Chronology
- Predecessor: AEC Regal IV
- Successor: Leyland National

The AEC Regal VI was an underfloor-engined single-decker bus chassis manufactured by AEC from 1962 to 1979. It was unveiled at the 1960 Commercial Motor Show and was intended to be a purely export chassis. It was an updated version of the underfloor-engined AEC Regal IV, having an 11.3-litre AH690 engine instead of the Regal IVs 9.6-litre AH590 engine. It was available in both left and right hand drive versions, other options included power assisted steering and air suspension.

== Operators ==
The Regal VI had a strong following, vehicles being exported to Argentina, Australia, Belgium, the Netherlands, Portugal and Uruguay.

The largest orders for the Regal VI, two orders totaling 150 were destined for the Montevideo area of Uruguay and a larger order of 500 came from Buenos Aires, Argentina.

In Australia, the Regal VI was purchased by the Melbourne & Metropolitan Tramways Board (100), the Municipal Tramways Trust, Adelaide (30) and the Metropolitan Transport Trust, Perth (75).

== Regal VIs variant ==
In South Africa, AEC engineered its own style of Regal, the Kudu. This was made up of a Regal VI chassis, an AV690 (11.3-litre vertical engine) mounted on the front overhang instead of under the floor. This allowed a reliably clean flow of air to the engine. There was still sufficient space to allow a front entrance ahead of the front axle, allowing the driver to supervise passenger loadings as on the standard Regal VI.

The Kudu was assembled from complete knock down kits at the Durban factory which had recently been acquired by AEC. By 1964 AEC (South Africa) Ltd had followed up the order for 100 with a repeat order for another 100, to be sold to operators all over South Africa. By 1974 over 1,500 were in service.
