= One Tree Hill, South Australia =

Coordinates: 34.719°S 138.766°E

One Tree Hill
- Town
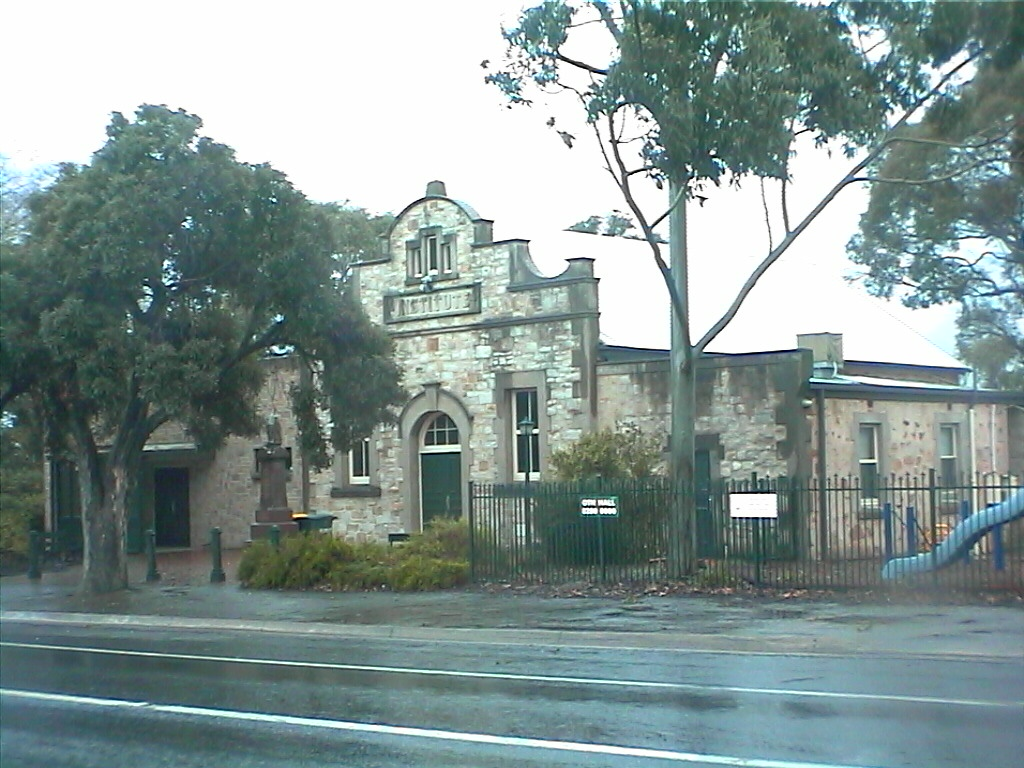
- One Tree Hill Institute Building
- Interactive map of One Tree Hill
- Country: Australia
- State: South Australia
- City: Adelaide
- LGA: City of Playford
- Location: 10 km (6.2 mi) E of Elizabeth; 28 km (17 mi) NNE of Adelaide CBD
- Established: 1851

Government
  - State electorate: King
  - Federal division: Spence

Population
  - Total: 1,043 (SAL 2021)
- Postcode: 5114
Localities around One Tree Hill
| Craigmore | Uleybury | Yattalunga |
| Hillbank | One Tree Hill | Humbug Scrub |
| Gould Creek | Gould Creek | Sampson Flat |

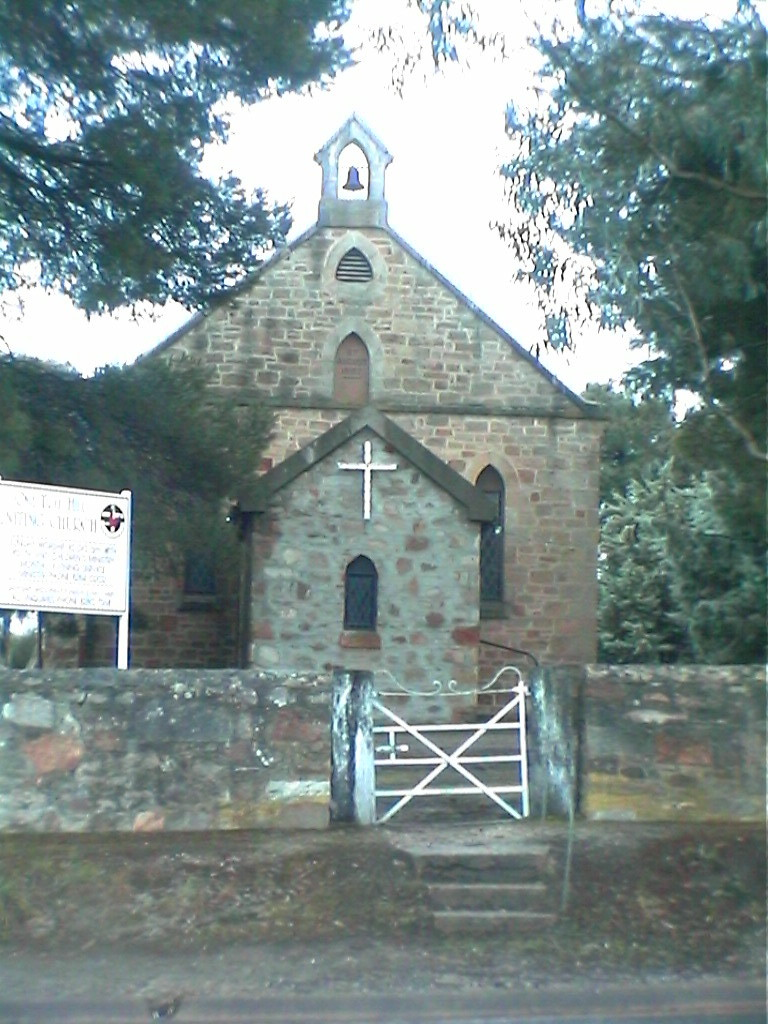
One Tree Hill Uniting Church built 1867

One Tree Hill is a town on the outskirts of Adelaide, South Australia. It is located in the City of Playford.

== History ==
The town takes its name from the 'One Tree Hill Inn' (licensed in 1851), for many years the meeting place of the District Council of Munno Para East. The inn's name, in turn, referred to a giant red gum tree which stood on the intersection of Black Top Road and Walters Road. The tree burnt down in 1890 and was cut down in 1934 and replaced with 5 trees which can still be seen today.

=== Aboriginal history ===
The Kaurna people were the indigenous inhabitants of the Adelaide region, which includes One Tree Hill. The Peramangk people, living further inland, visited the area from time to time, chiefly in the warmer parts of the year. This was due to the area being cooler and better watered than the plains. The hills at this time were well wooded with tree species that had been in the area for around 6000 years. Along the rivers and creeks and wide valleys could be found tall, heavy eucalypts, many of which had wide, hollowed bases large enough for the Aboriginals to use as shelters. There were many such shelter trees in use by the Kaurna and Peramangk as late as the 1840s, and evidence exists that they hunted and gathered in the woodlands and grasslands for many generations prior to European settlement. Unfortunately, the community declined soon after European settlement, and most of what we know about them today comes from the few artifacts and sparse archaeological evidence that they left behind.

=== European settlement ===
Europeans settled the area in the early 1840s, and the township commenced in 1851 with the building of the One Tree Hill Inn. The settlement was located in a strategic location, being close to several larger towns (such as Gawler and Salisbury) with facilities, and became the meeting place of the surrounding rural community, including Gould Creek and Uleybury. A post office and general store were built in 1858 which featured a large cellar where produce including local wine was sold. In 1906, the Institute, which cost about £600, was built across the road from the post office, and became a town meeting place and recreation centre, which was expanded considerably in 1978.

One Tree Hill Post Office opened on 19 May 1857.

== Demographics ==
The 2016 Census by the Australian Bureau of Statistics counted 1,095 persons in One Tree Hill on census night. Of these, 569 (52.2%) were male and 522 (47.8%) were female. The majority of residents 791 (72.7%) are of Australian birth, with 155 14.2% born in England. The median age of One Tree Hill residents is 45. Children aged 0 – 14 years made up 16.8% of the population and people aged 65 years and over made up 14.9% of the population.

== Community ==
The township has one primary school and several historic primary school buildings: Precolumb School (1855-1938), Uley School (1856 to 1971, now the Uleybury School Museum). In 1972 the current primary school was built on McGilp Road. One Tree Hill has an Institute Hall built 1906 and Uniting Church built 1867 (originally Methodist) and many historic buildings. The township has a small shopping centre and a hotel named the Blacksmiths Inn.

== Attractions ==
=== Parks ===
The Para Wirra Conservation Park is north-east of the town.

== Transport ==
There is no specific provision for bicycles on any of the local roads. There are footpaths on most roads within the town and along Black Top Road in some sections up three kilometres west of the town using land from the old alignment of the road.

=== Roads ===
The town is serviced by the following main roads:

- Black Top Road to Adelaide and Salisbury
- Yorktown Road to Elizabeth
- Gawler - Kersbrook Road to Kersbrook, Gawler and Williamstown
- One Tree Hill Road to Golden Grove

=== Public transport ===
The area is not serviced by Adelaide public transport; the nearest service is an Adelaide Metro bus route at Craigmore, five kilometres to the west of the town.

From the commencement of a Bowman's bus service around 1937 until Friday 14 May 1982, a daily bus service ran from the township to Adelaide via Golden Grove and North East Road (Route 540E). Before that the nearest transport was at Smithfield Railway Station.

== See also ==
- List of Adelaide suburbs
