= Upper Hermitage =

- Suburb
- Coordinates: 34°47′37″S 138°45′37″E
- Country: Australia
- State: South Australia
- City: Adelaide
- LGAs: City of Tea Tree Gully; Adelaide Hills Council
- Location: 11 km (6.8 mi) from Modbury

Government
  - State electorate: Little Para
  - Federal division: Makin

Population
  - Total: 273 (SAL 2021)
- Postcode: 5131
Suburbs around Upper Hermitage
	Gould Creek	Sampson Flat
Yatala Vale	Upper Hermitage	Inglewood

Upper Hermitage is an outer northeastern rural suburb of Adelaide, South Australia. It is located in the City of Tea Tree Gully and Adelaide Hills Council local government areas, and is adjacent to the rural districts of Yatala Vale and Gould Creek.

== History ==
Upper Hermitage's history revolves around agriculture and viticulture, as well as sand and freestone quarries, whose yields were used since early settlement days to build many South Australian public buildings, including the Adelaide Town Hall, General Post Office, Supreme Court and St Peter's Cathedral.
The Upper Hermitage district was significantly affected by the 1955 Black Sunday bushfires and 2015 Sampson Flat bushfires.

== Geography ==
The boundary of Upper Hermitage is defined on the east by Warner Road, on the north by the Little Para River, on the south by a small stretch of Yatala Vale Road, and on the west by the district of Yatala Vale. It is broadly speaking east of the Golden Grove conurbation. The main roads of Upper Hermitage were all named after pioneer families of the district, namely Warner Road, Neale Road and Verrall Road.

== Facilities ==
Upper Hermitage has a Country Fire Station, and there used to be a winery (Glenara Wines) on Range Road North, which is now closed. It also has two tennis courts and a tennis club (formerly the CWA rooms) on the corner of Range Road North and Warner road, which is, to date, in disuse, the second court serving as a car park for the CFS.

== Transport ==
The area is not serviced by Adelaide public transport.
