= Dry Creek (South Australia) =

River in South Australia

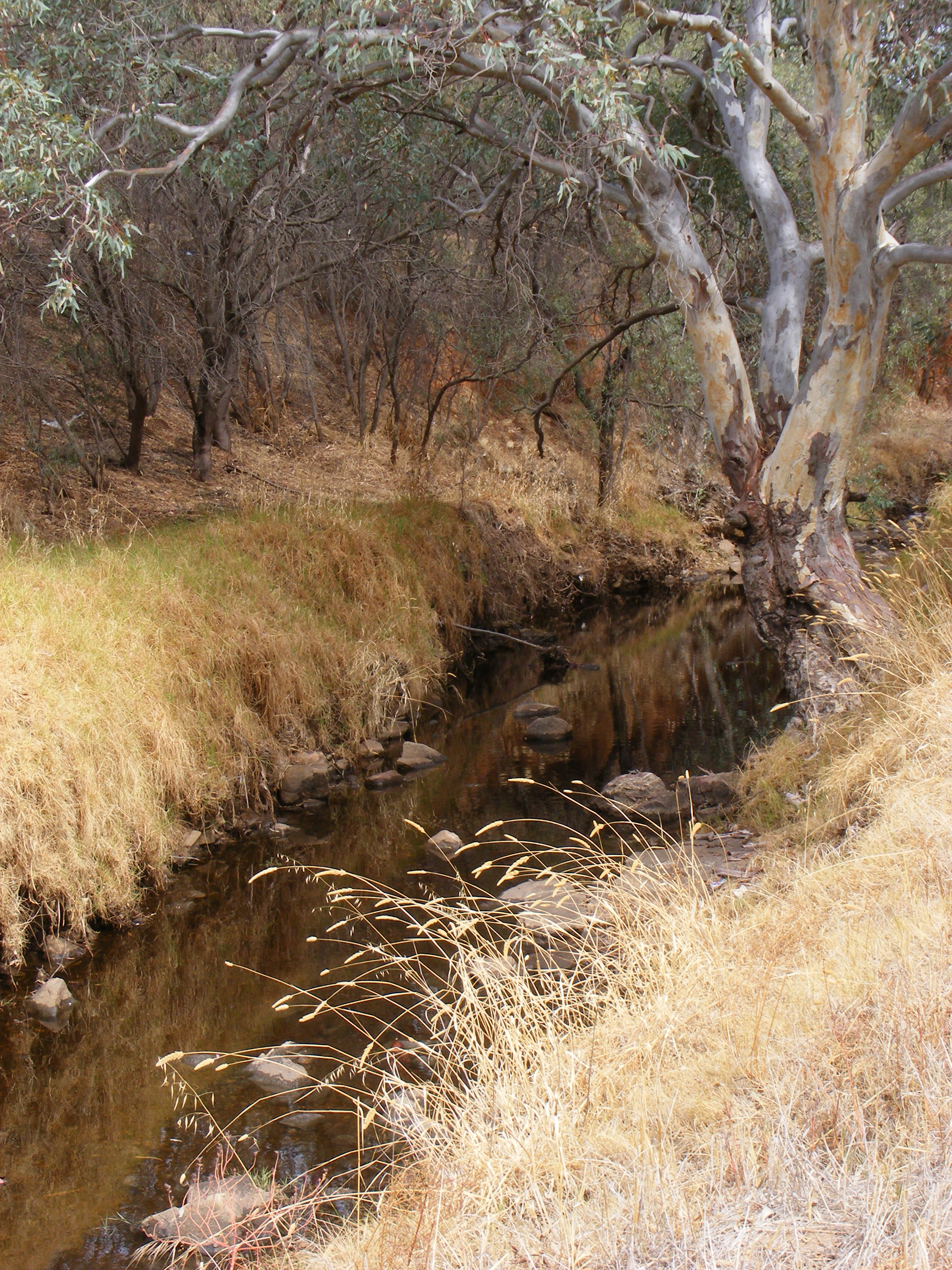
- Dry Creek at the rear of Yatala Labour Prison, March 2008

Location
- Country: Australia
- State: South Australia
- Local government areas: Salisbury, Tea Tree Gully

Physical characteristics
- Source
  - location: Yatala Vale
  - coordinates: 34.7936426°S 138.7325619°E
- Mouth: Barker Inlet
  - location: Dry Creek
  - coordinates: 34°47′40″S 138°34′39″E

Dry Creek or Dry Creek Drain is a seasonal stream in South Australia which passes through the Adelaide suburbs of Wynn Vale, Modbury, Walkley Heights and Pooraka. The nearby suburb of Dry Creek and Dry Creek railway station are named after the stream.

== Description ==
In season Dry Creek flows from its source near Yatala Vale in the Mount Lofty Ranges to the Barker Inlet of the Gulf St Vincent via a manufactured drain near Globe Derby Park. The flooded state of the plain either side of Dry Creek after heavy rain is presumed to be the source of the local place name 'Yatala' (as in Hundred of Yatala and Yatala Vale). The name is likely derived from the indigenous word 'yertalla', which means "water running by the side of a river". Dry Creek is mostly dry in summer and flows through a deep gully at the rear of the prison with outcrops of exposed pre-Cambrian rocks that were extensively quarried as part of prison activity.

Yatala Labour Prison was established in the 1854 next to Dry Creek and was alternately known at the time as the Dry Creek Prison or the Stockade. The rock from the quarry was transported to Adelaide via the Stockade railway station (opened in 1857; closed 1961), with the area around the station and quarry being since redeveloped as the Stockade Botanical Park.

A 14 km long walkway, known as Dry Creek River Trail, runs along the creek in the Dry Creek Reserve.

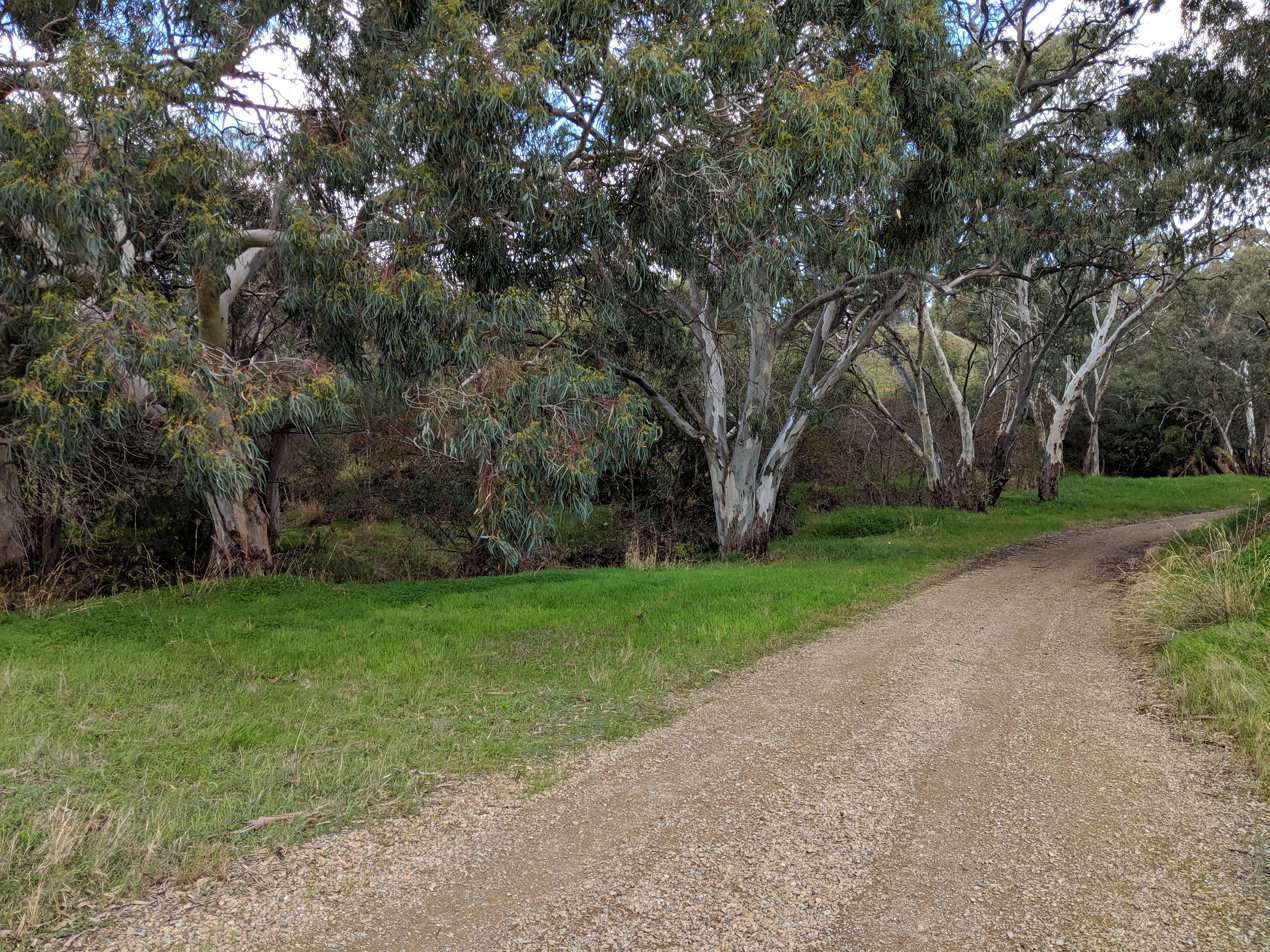
Dry Creek at Walkley Heights

== Notes ==
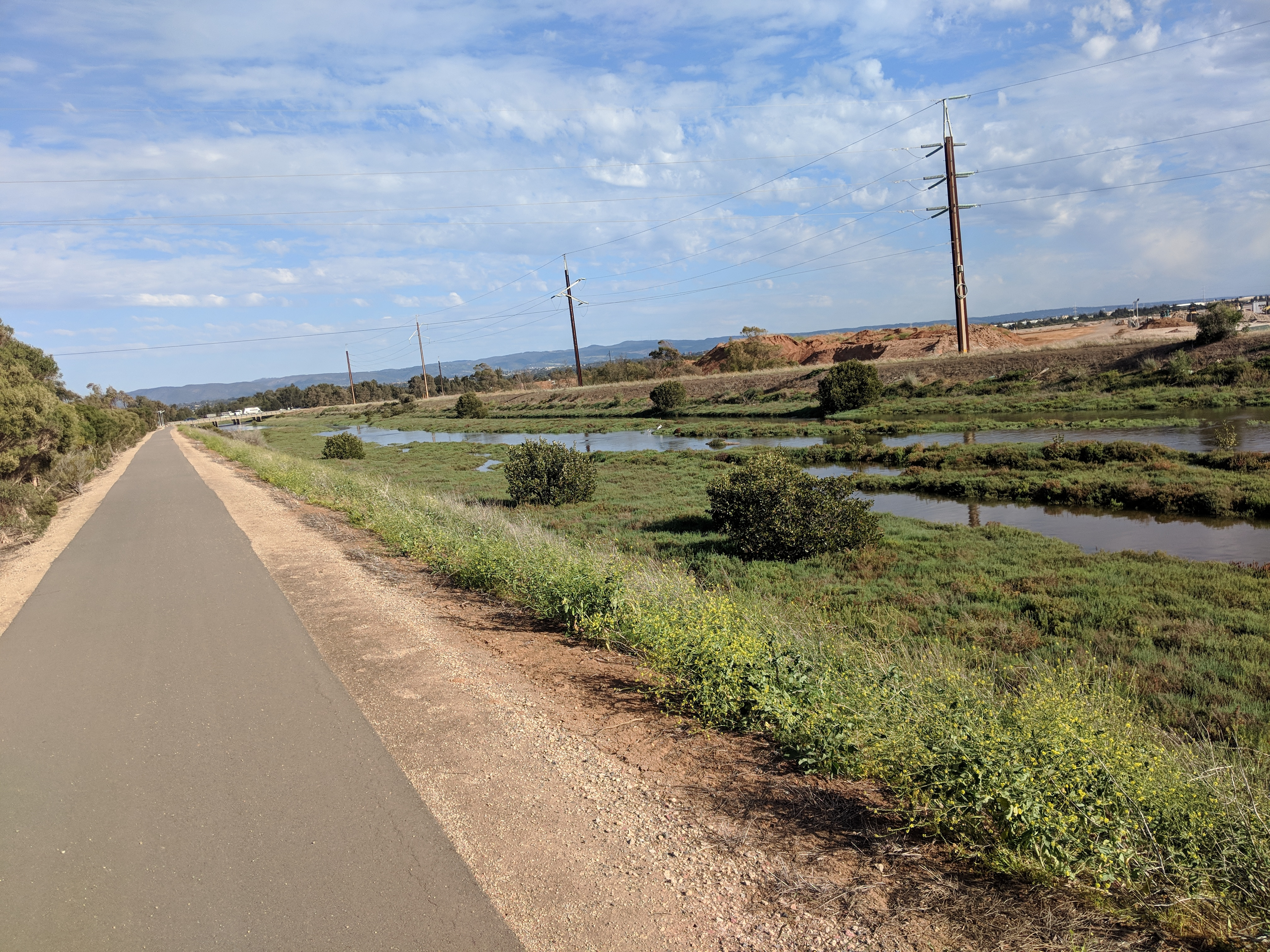
Dry Creek drain (which forms the border of the suburbs of Dry Creek and Globe Derby Park) shown facing south east in late spring
