= Gould Creek =

- Suburb
- Coordinates: 34°44′56″S 138°43′16″E
- Country: Australia
- State: South Australia
- City: Adelaide
- LGAs: City of Tea Tree Gully; City of Playford
- Location: 8 km (5.0 mi) from Elizabeth

Government
  - State electorate: King
  - Federal divisions: Makin; Spence

Population
  - Total: 240 (SAL 2021)
- Postcode: 5114
Suburbs around Gould Creek
	One Tree Hill
Hillbank	Gould Creek	Sampson Flat
Greenwith	Yatala Vale	Upper Hermitage

Gould Creek is an outer northeastern rural suburb of Adelaide, South Australia. Gould Creek is located in the City of Tea Tree Gully and City of Playford local government areas, and is adjacent to Greenwith, Salisbury Heights and Hillbank, as well as the rural districts of Yatala Vale and Upper Hermitage and the town of One Tree Hill.

== History ==
=== European settlement ===
Gould Creek is a creek with several fresh water springs which historically flowed into the Little Para River.

The first European settlers were James Fisher (eldest son of J. H. Fisher) and Fred Handcock. The bachelor partners, aged twenty-three, first visited this locality in December 1837 when they accompanied Colonel William Light on his exploration to discover the Barossa Valley. In early 1838 they pioneered a pastoral run at the junction of Little Para River and Gould Creek. Their squatters' homestead, with mud chimney and thatched reed roof, known as Fisher and Handcock's Station, was sketched by William Light and was one of the earliest to be built outside Adelaide.

Following surveys and closer settlement this became the site of Cumberland Farm, owned by pioneer Reuben Richardson (after whom a street in neighbouring Greenwith has now been named). Agriculture played a key role in Gould Creek's early history, but from the early 1960s onward, Gould Creek played a critical role in Adelaide's utilities.

In the early 1960s, the 275kV Para substation was built to transmit power from the large, gas-fired Torrens Island Power Station, which came online in 1967. The substation was monitored and controlled by an innovative electronic remote supervisory system, which was commissioned in 1968. In 1989, it was expanded as the Adelaide landing point of the Heywood interconnector which provides a 275kV link from Victoria.

The Little Para Reservoir was built between 1974 and 1977 and commissioned in 1979, functioning largely as a balancing storage for Murray River water, and also serving a flood mitigation role. The reservoir has a capacity of 20,800 megalitres and almost 300,000 cubic metres of rock was used in the reservoir's construction.

In 2021, Gould Creek was selected as the location for South Australia's largest battery project.

== Demographics ==
The 2016 Census by the Australian Bureau of Statistics counted 242 persons in the suburb of Gould Creek on census night. Of these, 130 (54.4%) were male and 109 (45.6%) were female. The majority of residents 184 (81.8%) was born in Australia. 17 (7.6%) were born in England. The median age of Hillbank residents is 46. Children aged 0–14 years made up 13.7% of the population and people aged 65 years and over made up 10.3% of the population.

== Geography ==
The boundaries of Gould Creek are the end of the suburb of Hillbank to the west, the Little Para River to the south, the town of One Tree Hill to the north and One Tree Hill Road and Hannaford Hump Road to the east. Gould Creek is north of the Golden Grove conurbation and east of Elizabeth.

== Transport ==
The area is not serviced by Adelaide public transport, rather, school service busses are run by independent private companies.
