= Inglewood, South Australia =

Inglewood
- Suburb
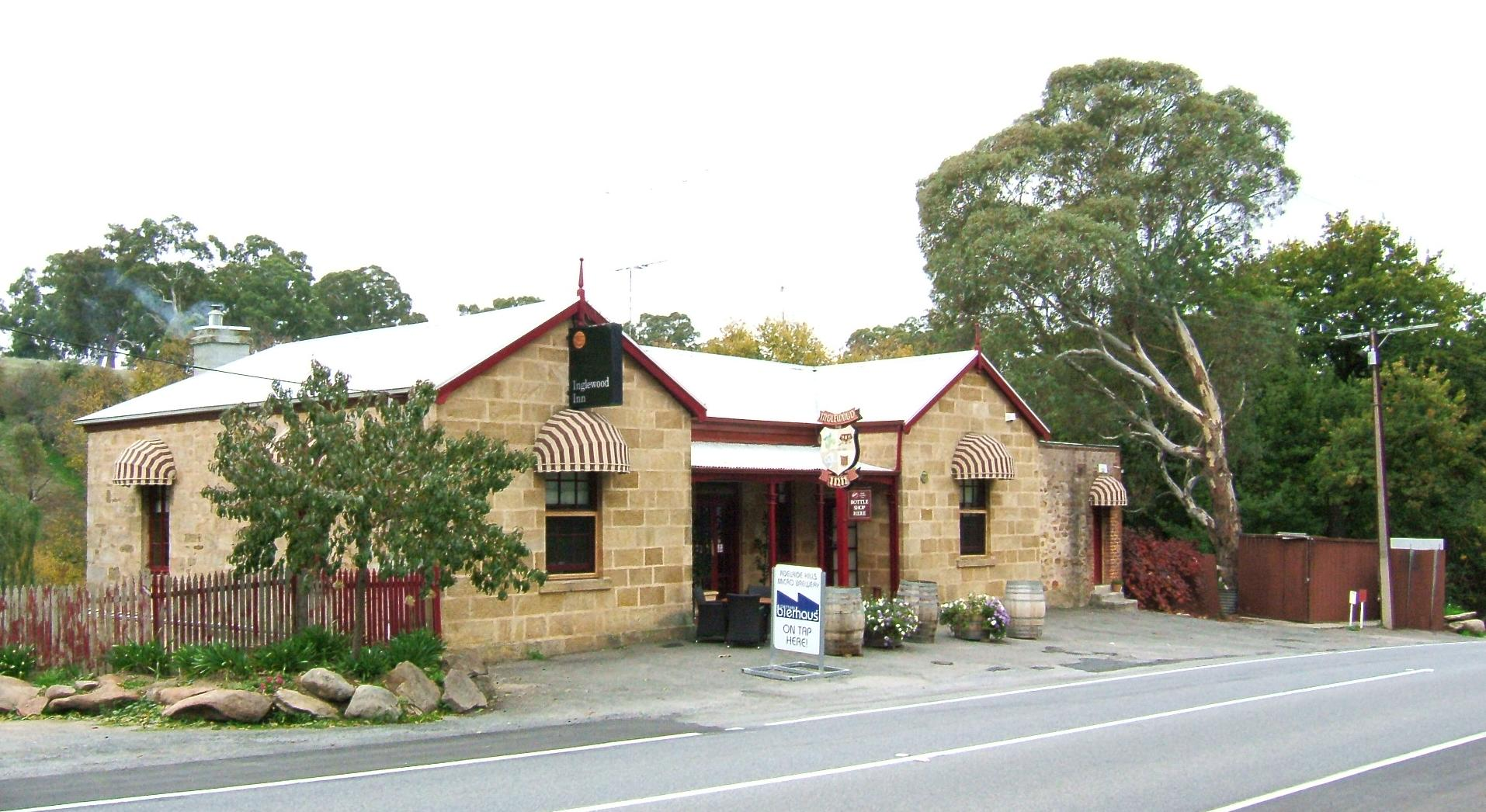
- Inglewood Inn

- Coordinates: 34°49′0″S 138°46′0″E
- Country: Australia
- State: South Australia
- LGA: Adelaide Hills Council
- Location: 24 km (15 mi) from Adelaide

Government
  - State electorate: Newland
  - Federal division: Mayo

Population
  - Total: 378 (SAL 2021)
- Postcode: 5133
Suburbs around Inglewood
Lower Hermitage	Sampson Flat	Kersbrook
Lower Hermitage; Upper Hermitage	Inglewood	Millbrook; Chain of Ponds
Houghton	Paracombe	Millbrook

Inglewood is a small town near Adelaide, South Australia. It is located in the Adelaide Hills Council local government area, and is adjacent to Houghton, Paracombe and the rural districts of Upper Hermitage and Chain of Ponds.

== History ==
The historic Inglewood Inn on North East Road was built by Firman Deacon in 1857, on land purchased as a private subdivision from William Reeds of Houghton. According to reports, Deacon offered beer to workers who could find a suitable name for the inn and, at their suggestion, it was named after Inglewood Forest in Cumberland, England. The name is derived from two Anglo-Saxon words: Engle meaning Angle or English and wud meaning woods.

The inn was licensed in 1858 (and rented by John Randall) and played a significant role as a focus for the development of the area, and also gave it its name. The area also played an indirect role in the naming of Ingle Farm. The inn survives today and is listed on the South Australian Heritage Register and the former Register of the National Estate. Inglewood Post Office opened in July 1865 but not listed officially until 1869. The town also has a bakery and a hairdresser, located on North East Road.

The current boundaries of Inglewood were established in October 2001 for the long established name. In 1954, the population was 110, and at the 2006 census, it had a population of 264. Its boundaries with Lower Hermitage were altered in October 2005 and it gained an area from Millbrook in August 2015.

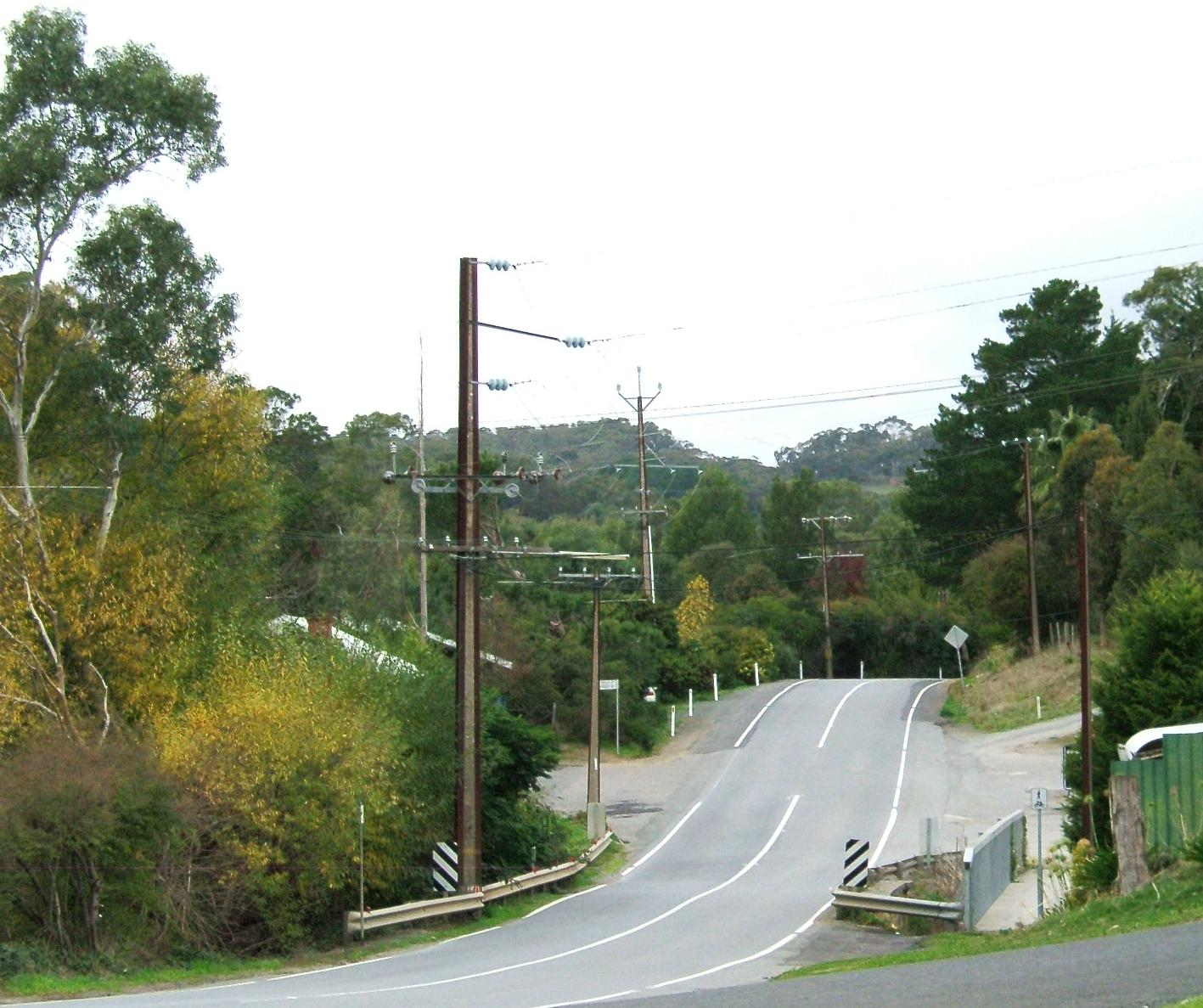
The main road

== Transport ==
The area is not serviced by Adelaide public transport. A coach is operated from Tea Tree Plaza Interchange to Gumeracha and Mount Pleasant by Link SA.
