= Houghton, South Australia =

Houghton
- Suburb
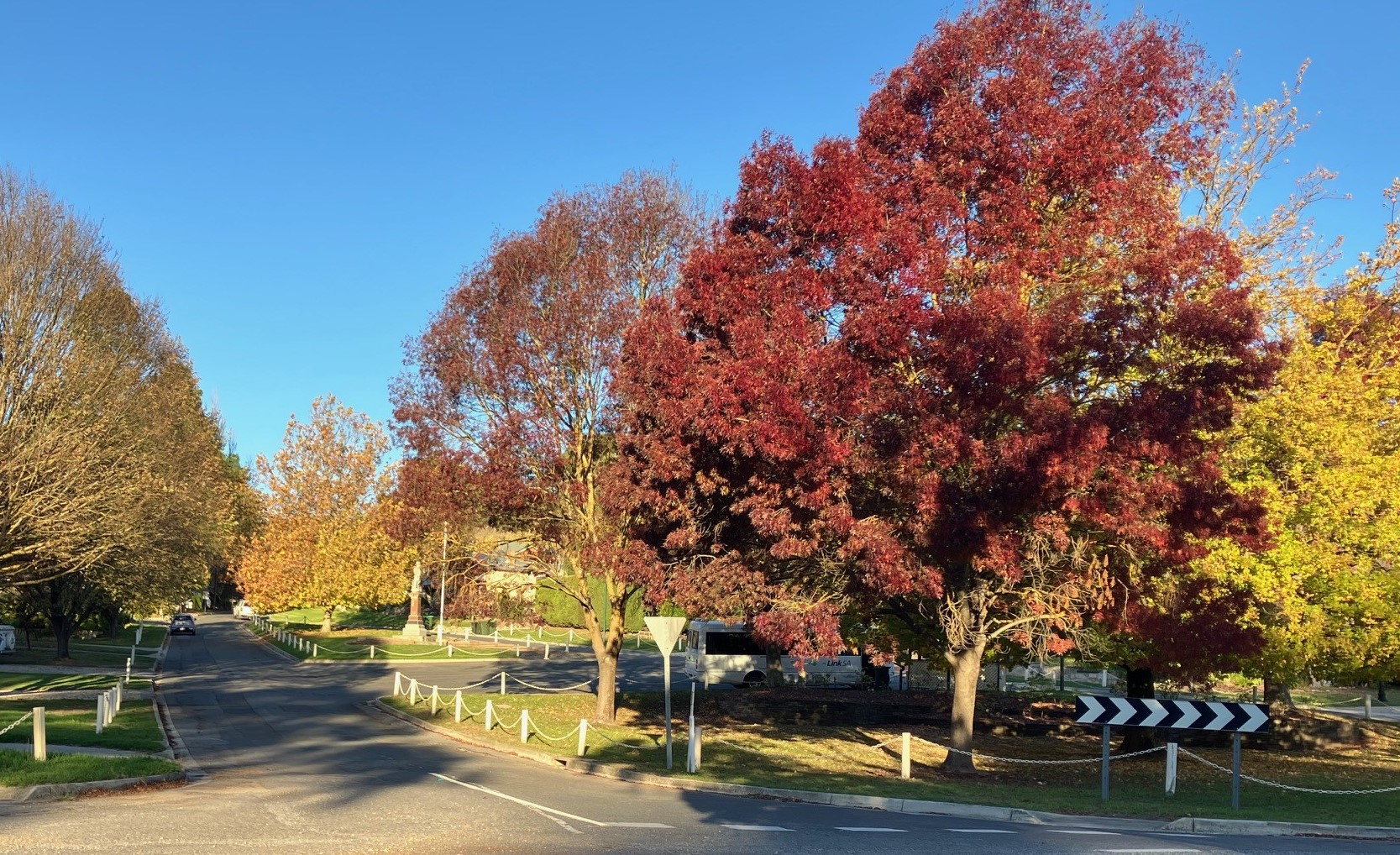
- Houghton Village Square

- Country: Australia
- State: South Australia
- City: Adelaide
- LGAs: Adelaide Hills Council; City of Tea Tree Gully
- Location: 22 km (14 mi) Adelaide of

Government
  - State electorate: Kavel
  - Federal division: Mayo

Population
  - Total: 511 (SAL 2021)
- Postcode: 5131
Suburbs around Houghton
Fairview Park
Tea Tree Gully	Houghton	Inglewood
Vista	Paracombe

Houghton is a small town near Adelaide, South Australia. It is located in the Adelaide Hills, in the City of Tea Tree Gully and the Adelaide Hills Council local government areas between Tea Tree Gully and Inglewood on the North East Road.

== History ==
In 1838, John Richardson, a land agent and surveyor, arrived in the Adelaide Colony. In 1841, he laid out Houghton as a village on section 5519 Hundred of Yatala. Purchasing land from J. B. Hack, Richardson then placed Joseph Barritt in charge of his property, which he named The Houghton Lodge. By 1842, the little village had its first inn, The Travellers Rest. It built its first church in 1843, by 1847 a school was established, and the post office opened in 1848. Houghton was the earliest village in the district of Tea Tree Gully and for many years the largest. In 1857, some of the land was sold which formed the neighbouring village of Inglewood.

== Geography ==
Houghton is located between Tea Tree Gully and Inglewood at the intersection of North East Road and Lower North East Road. The ABS 2001 census found 438 people living in 151 dwellings.

== Facilities ==
The area has a few small shops, the Highercombe Golf Course, and a primary school (which has now closed due to lack of numbers) and oval. It backs onto the Anstey Hill Recreation Park which is accessible from nearby Vista.

== Transport ==
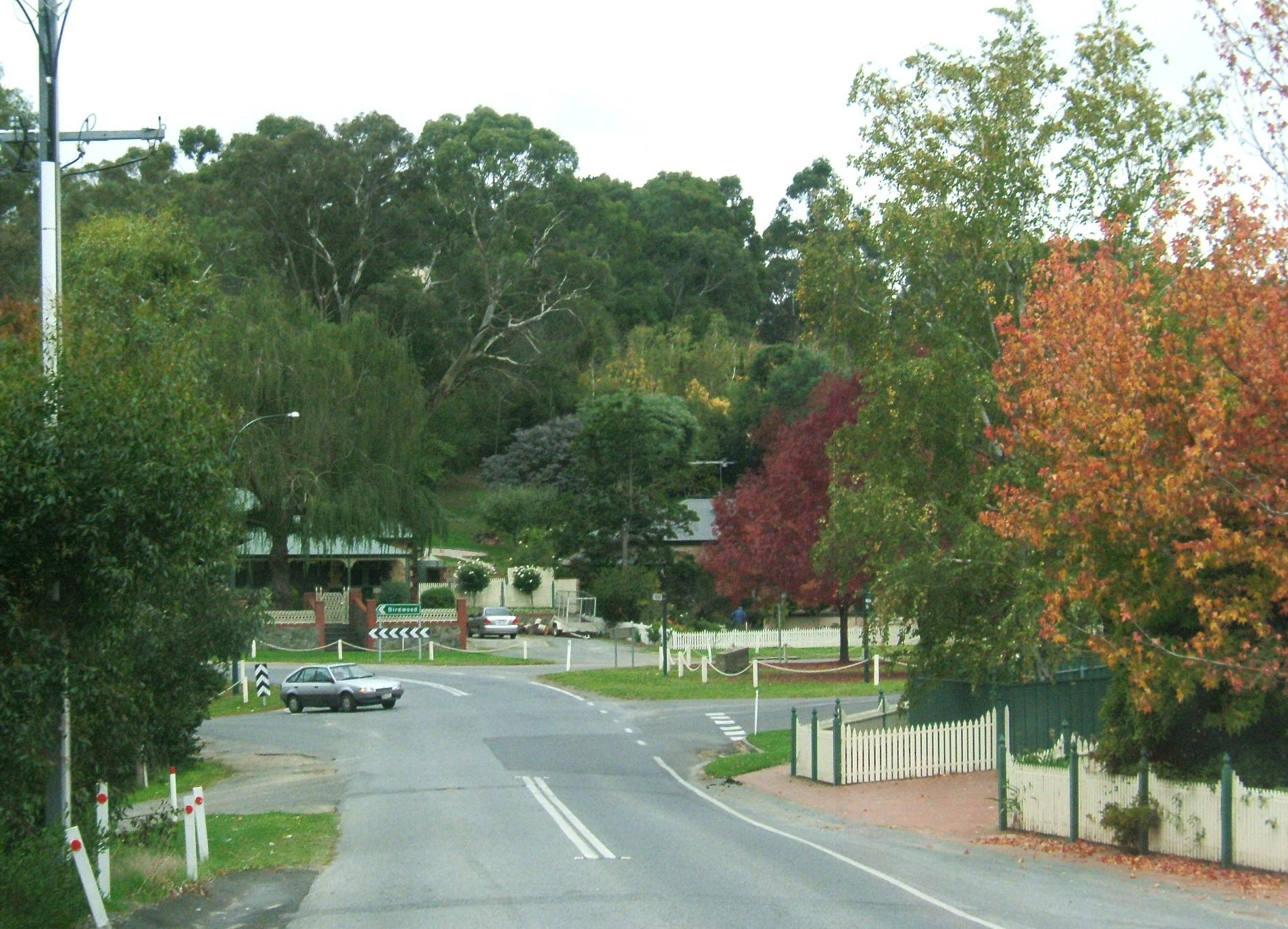
The main road

The area is not serviced by Adelaide public transport. A coach is operated from Tea Tree Plaza Interchange to Gumeracha and Mount Pleasant by Affordable Coachlines.
