= Adelaide Hills Council =

- Local government area
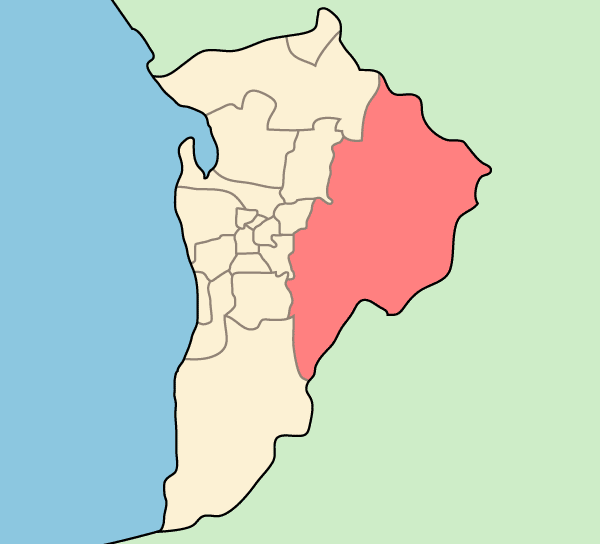
- Adelaide Hills Council

- Interactive map of Adelaide Hills Council
- Coordinates: 34°57′S 138°53′E
- Country: Australia
- State: South Australia
- Region: Adelaide Hills
- Established: 1997
- Council seat: Stirling

Government
  - Mayor: Nathan Daniell
  - State electorate: Heysen, Morialta, Kavel, Schubert
  - Federal divisions: Mayo; Sturt

Area
  - Total: 795.08 km^{2} (306.98 sq mi)

Population
  - Total: 40,879 (LGA 2021)
  - Density: 50/km^{2} (130/sq mi)
- Website: Adelaide Hills Council
LGAs around Adelaide Hills Council
City of Tea Tree Gully	City of Playford	The Barossa Council
City of Burnside	Adelaide Hills Council	Mid Murray Council
City of Onkaparinga	Mitcham City Council	District Council of Mount Barker

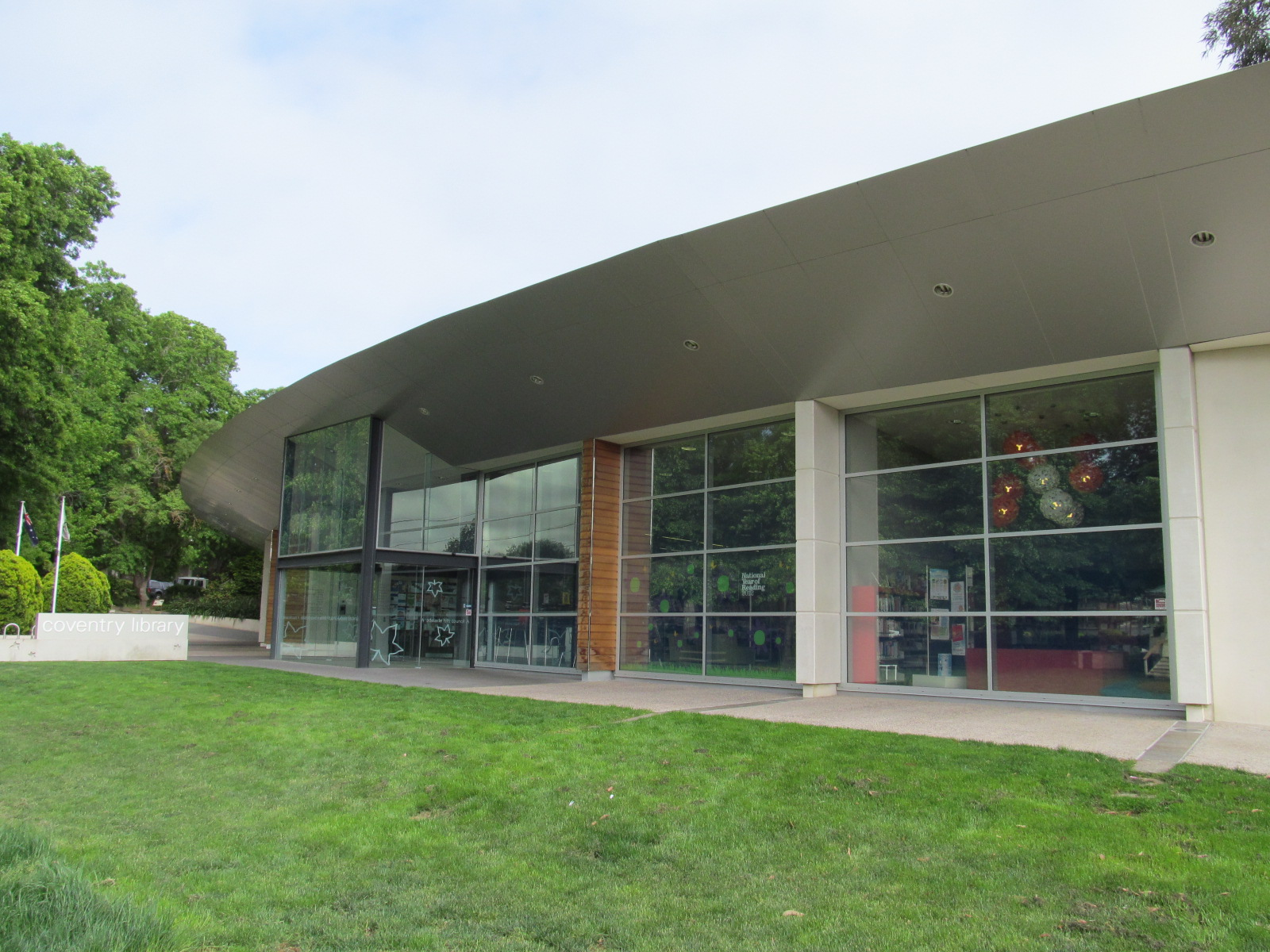
Adelaide Hills Council Head Office, Stirling

Adelaide Hills Council is a local government area in the Adelaide Hills of South Australia. It is in the hills east of Adelaide, the capital of South Australia. It extends from the South Para Reservoir in the north, to the Mount Bold Reservoir in the south.

== History ==
The council was established in 1997 by the amalgamation of the District Council of East Torrens, the District Council of Gumeracha, the District Council of Onkaparinga and the District Council of Stirling.

== Council ==
New map featuring three new wards with 4 elected members each. These will be used for the 2027 South Australian local elections.

Previous map featuring the 7-membered Ranges ward (blue) and 5-membered Valleys ward (red).

Wards of the Adelaide Hills Council.

Independents: 9 seats Independent Liberal: 1 seat Independent Greens: 1 seat Independent Labor: 1 seat

Results of the 2022 South Australian local elections in Adelaide Hills: Independents: 9 seats Independent Liberal: 1 seat Independent Greens: 1 seat Independent Labor: 1 seat

Council consists of 13 Elected Members comprising a Mayor, and 12 Ward Councillors. Valleys Ward is represented by five Council Members and the Ranges Ward is represented by seven.

The Chief Executive Officer (CEO) is appointed by the Council. The current CEO is Mr. Greg Georgopoulos who was appointed in July 2023.

The current council as of May 2026 is:

Ward	Party Affiliation (based on 2022 affiliation)	Councillor	First elected	Notes
Mayor	Independent	Nathan Daniell	2026	
Chief Executive Officer		Greg Georgopoulos	2023	
Ranges Ward	Independent	Kirrilee Boyd	2014	
Ranges Ward	Labor	Adrian Cheater	2022	
Ranges Ward	Independent	Nathan Daniell	2014	
Ranges Ward	Labor	Leith Mudge	2018	
Ranges Ward	Independent	Mark Osterstock	2018	
Ranges Ward	Independent	Kirsty Parkin	2018	
Ranges Ward	Independent	Georgia McDonnell	2026	
Valley Ward	Independent	Alex Trescowthick	2025	
Valley Ward	Independent	Chris Grant	2018	
Valley Ward	Independent	Malcolm Herrmann	2010	Deputy Mayor
Valley Ward	Liberal	Lucy Huxter	2022	
Valley Ward	Independent	Richard Gladigau	2025	

=== Mayors ===
Since the establishment of the Council in 1997 there have been five Mayors.

- 1997–2000: Anita Aspinall
- 2000–2010: Bill Cooksley
- 2010–2018: Bill Spragg
- 2018–2025: Jan-Claire Wisdom
- 2026– Current: Nathan Daniell

== Suburbs ==
The Adelaide Hills Council contains the following suburbs and localities:

- Aldgate
- Ashton
- Balhannah
- Basket Range
- Birdwood (part)
- Bradbury (part)
- Bridgewater (part)
- Carey Gully
- Castambul
- Chain Of Ponds
- Charleston
- Cherryville
- Cleland (part)
- Crafers West (part)
- Crafers
- Cromer (part)
- Cudlee Creek
- Dorset Vale (part)
- Forest Range
- Forreston
- Greenhill
- Gumeracha
- Hay Valley (part)
- Heathfield
- Horsnell Gully
- Houghton (part)
- Hahndorf (part)
- Humbug Scrub (part)
- Inglewood
- Ironbank (part)
- Kenton Valley
- Kersbrook
- Lenswood
- Lobethal
- Longwood
- Lower Hermitage
- Marble Hill
- Millbrook
- Montacute
- Mount Crawford (part)
- Mount George
- Mount Torrens (part)
- Mylor
- Norton Summit
- Oakbank
- Paracombe (part)
- Piccadilly
- Rostrevor (part)
- Scott Creek
- Stirling
- Summertown
- Teringie
- Upper Hermitage (part)
- Upper Sturt (part)
- Uraidla
- Verdun (part)
- Woodforde
- Woodside
