= Chain of Ponds, South Australia =

Chain of Ponds
- Suburb
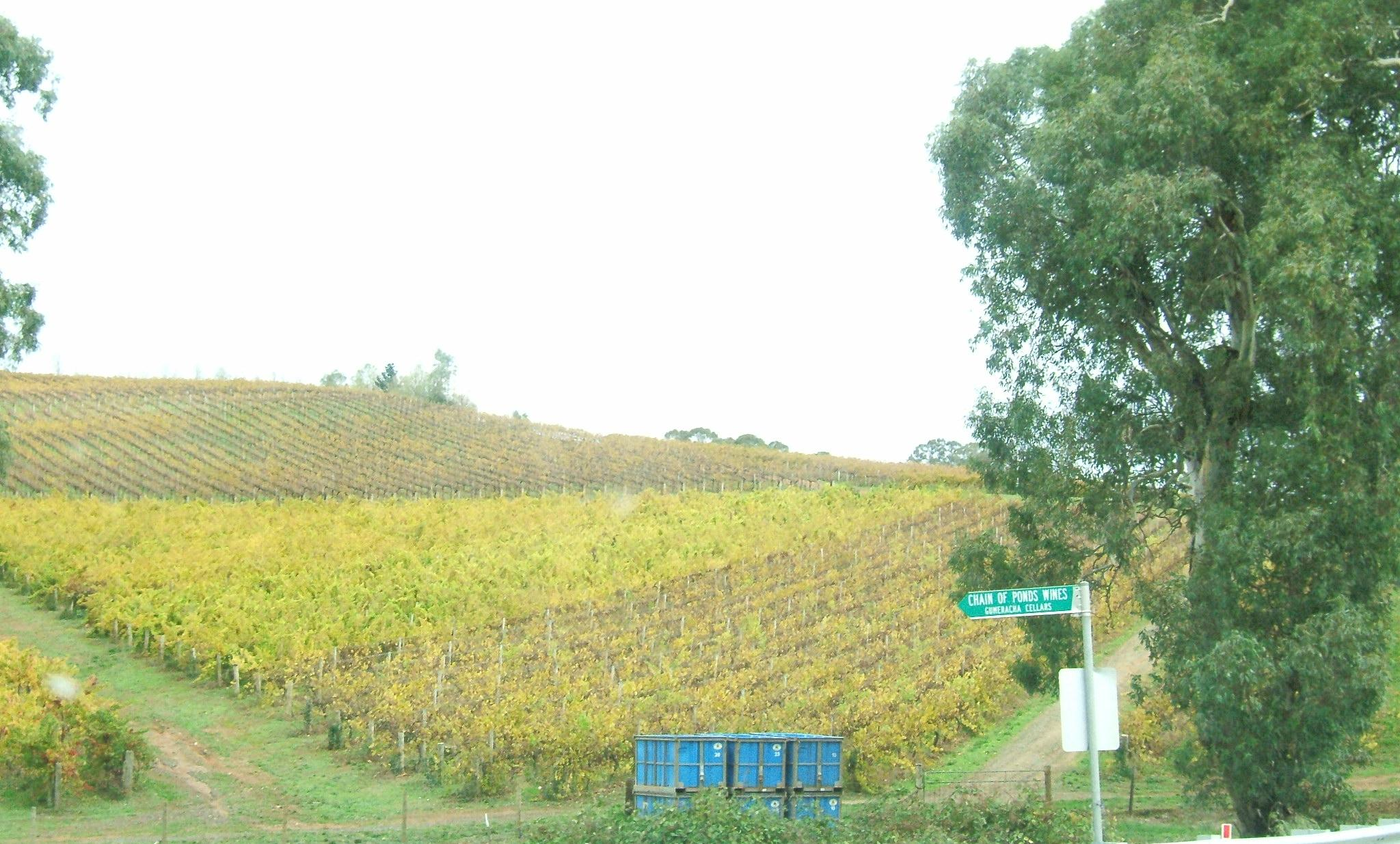
- Winery at Chain of Ponds

- Coordinates: 34°49′26″S 138°49′56″E
- Country: Australia
- State: South Australia
- Region: Adelaide Hills
- LGA: Adelaide Hills Council
- Location: 29 km (18 mi) from Adelaide
- Established: 25 October 2001 (locality)

Government
  - State electorate: Newland
  - Federal division: Mayo

Population
  - Total: 39 (SAL 2021)
- Time zone: UTC+9:30 (ACST)
  - Summer (DST): UTC+10:30 (ACST)
- Postcode: 5231
- County: Adelaide
- Mean max temp: 19.0 °C (66.2 °F)
- Mean min temp: 9.8 °C (49.6 °F)
- Annual rainfall: 656.0 mm (25.83 in)
Suburbs around Chain of Ponds
Kersbrook	Kersbrook	Kersbrook
Millbrook	Chain of Ponds	Gumeracha; Cudlee Creek
Paracombe	Cudlee Creek	Cudlee Creek

Chain of Ponds is a locality and former town near Adelaide, South Australia. It is located in the Adelaide Hills Council local government area.

== History ==
The settlement was established by the South Australia Company, and was originally called Philptown after founding publican Oliver Philp. First settled early in the 1840s, the township was laid out after the opening of the North East Road in the 1850s. By this time, the town was reported to include two post office buildings, institute, church, service station, a handful of cottages and the old Morning Star Hotel. In 1864, the town was renamed Chain of Ponds, after a series of nearby ponds which were connected underground.

There was also a nearby township at Millbrook, but it was demolished to make way for the Millbrook Reservoir, which was constructed between 1914 and 1918 to control the flow of the upper Torrens River and supply the eastern suburbs of Adelaide from an appropriate elevation. In the 1970s, Chain of Ponds was also demolished to safeguard against water pollution in the reservoir. Little more than a cemetery exists as a reminder of Chain of Ponds, though it appears on maps as a navigation point.

== Geography ==
Chain of Ponds is located between Inglewood and Gumeracha along the Adelaide-Mannum Road, and south of Kersbrook along the Little Para Road.

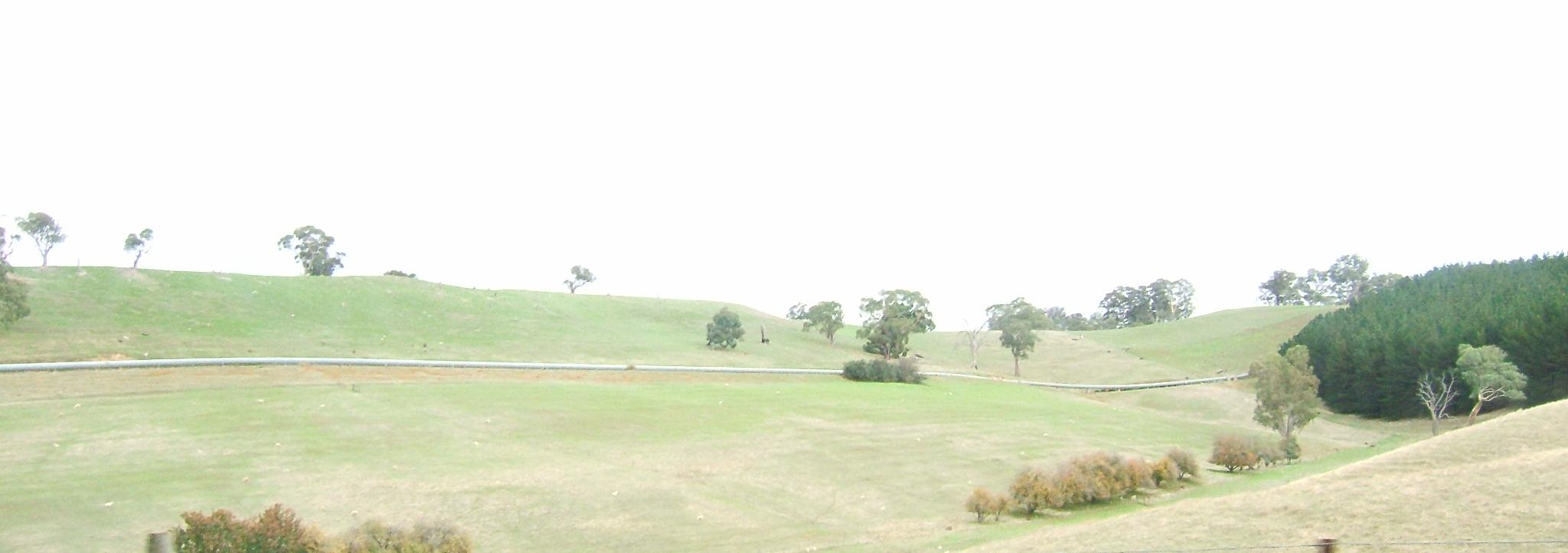
Water pipeline in Cudlee Creek

== Services ==
The few remaining residents (22 people according to the 2016 Australian census) are served by facilities in Inglewood.

=== Transport ===
Chain of Ponds is not serviced by Adelaide public transport. A coach is operated from Tea Tree Plaza Interchange to Gumeracha and Mount Pleasant by LinkSA.
