= Humbug Scrub =

- Suburb
- Coordinates: 34°43′14″S 138°48′58″E
- Country: Australia
- State: South Australia
- City: Adelaide
- LGAs: City of Playford; Adelaide Hills Council

Government
  - State electorate: Newland
  - Federal divisions: Mayo; Spence

Population
  - Total: 410 (SAL 2021)
- Postcode: 5114
Suburbs around Humbug Scrub
	Yattalunga	Williamstown
One Tree Hill	Humbug Scrub	Kersbrook
Sampson Flat		Kersbrook

Humbug Scrub is a locality north of Adelaide, South Australia in the local government areas of the Adelaide Hills Council and the City of Playford which contains the southern third of Para Wirra Conservation Park.

== Relation To The 'Snowtown Murders' ==
Thomas Eugenio Trevilyan, a victim and accomplice in the Snowtown murders, was found hanging from a tree in Humbug Scrub on November 6, 1997. Trevilyan, who suffered from paranoid schizophrenia, had been living with the murderers John Bunting and Robert Wagner for several months and had assisted in killing one of their victims. In November 1997, Bunting and Wagner drove Trevilyan to Humbug Scrub, made him lean against a box, and put a noose around his neck. Trevilyan was discovered dead the following day, and the coroner determined that he had committed suicide, citing his history of prior attempts.

== Demographics ==
The 2016 Census by the Australian Bureau of Statistics counted 416 persons at Humbug Scrub on census night. Of these, 215 (52.1%) were male and 198 (47.9%) were female. The majority of residents 300 (73.2%) was born in Australia. 46 (11.2%) were born in England. The median age of Humbug Scrub residents is 51. Children aged 0–14 years made up 12.1% of the population and people aged 65 years and over made up 21.9% of the population.
