= Paracombe =

Paracombe Adelaide, South Australia
- Coordinates: 34°51′01″S 138°46′43″E
- Population: 435 (SAL 2021)
- Established: 1841
- Postcode(s): 5132
- Location: 24 km (15 mi) from Adelaide
- LGA(s): Adelaide Hills Council; City of Tea Tree Gully
- State electorate(s): Newland
- Federal division(s): Mayo
Localities around Paracombe:
Houghton	Inglewood	Chain of Ponds
Highbury	Paracombe	Cudlee Creek
Castambul

Paracombe is a small town near Adelaide, South Australia. At the 2011 census, Paracombe had a population of 343.

== Geography ==
Paracombe is located south of Inglewood on the road out of Adelaide via Athelstone (Gorge Road).

== History ==
The name probably originates from the Little Para River whose headwaters are in the area. It was settled in 1840–41 by John Barton Hack and John Richardson, and was a sheep station until the beginning of the 20th century. It was subdivided and, with an influx of smaller landholders, a school, post office, church and recreation hall were built, but the town did not grow much beyond this.

In 1966, work started on the Kangaroo Creek Reservoir, a dam of the River Torrens, and in 1969 it was completed at a cost of $5.3 million. Apart from supplying water to eastern Adelaide, it also serves a flood protection role and holds 19,160 megalitres.

== Facilities ==
Paracombe has a primary school, a recreation centre and a Country Fire Station.

== Transport ==
The area is not serviced by Adelaide Metro public transport. A coach is operated from Tea Tree Plaza Interchange to Gumeracha and Mount Pleasant by LinkSA.
