= Yatala Vale, South Australia =

Yatala Vale
- Suburb
- Country: Australia
- State: South Australia
- City: Adelaide
- LGA: City of Tea Tree Gully
- Location: 9 km (5.6 mi) from Modbury

Government
  - State electorate: Little Para
  - Federal division: Makin

Population
  - Total: 260 (SAL 2021)
- Postcode: 5126
Suburbs around Yatala Vale
	Gould Creek
Golden Grove	Yatala Vale	Upper Hermitage
Fairview Park

Yatala Vale is an outer northeastern rural suburb of Adelaide, South Australia. It is located in the City of Tea Tree Gully local government area, and is adjacent to Golden Grove and Fairview Park, as well as the rural districts of Upper Hermitage and Gould Creek.

== Name ==
The name Yatala was used by settlers for a large area north of the River Torrens stretching from the coast at Port Adelaide to Tea Tree Gully. The word is presumed to refer to the flooded state of the plain either side of Dry Creek, which starts near Yatala Vale, after heavy rain

== History ==
Yatala Vale Receiving Office (a limited post office) opened on 2 October 1911 and closed in late 1912.

Yatala Vale was and is used for agriculture and viticulture.

== Geography ==
The southern boundary of Yatala Vale is defined by Yatala Vale Road, with the rest of the suburb filling an uneven area bounded by the Golden Grove sand quarries to the west, the Little Para Reservoir to the north and the Little Para River to the east.

== Facilities ==
There is an industrial area on Yatala Vale Road.

== Transport ==
The 542 bus routes services Yatala Vale Road, which is operated by Adelaide Metro. The remainder is not serviced.

== See also ==
- Hundred of Yatala
