= Little Para Dam =

Dam and reservoir in Adelaide, South Australia

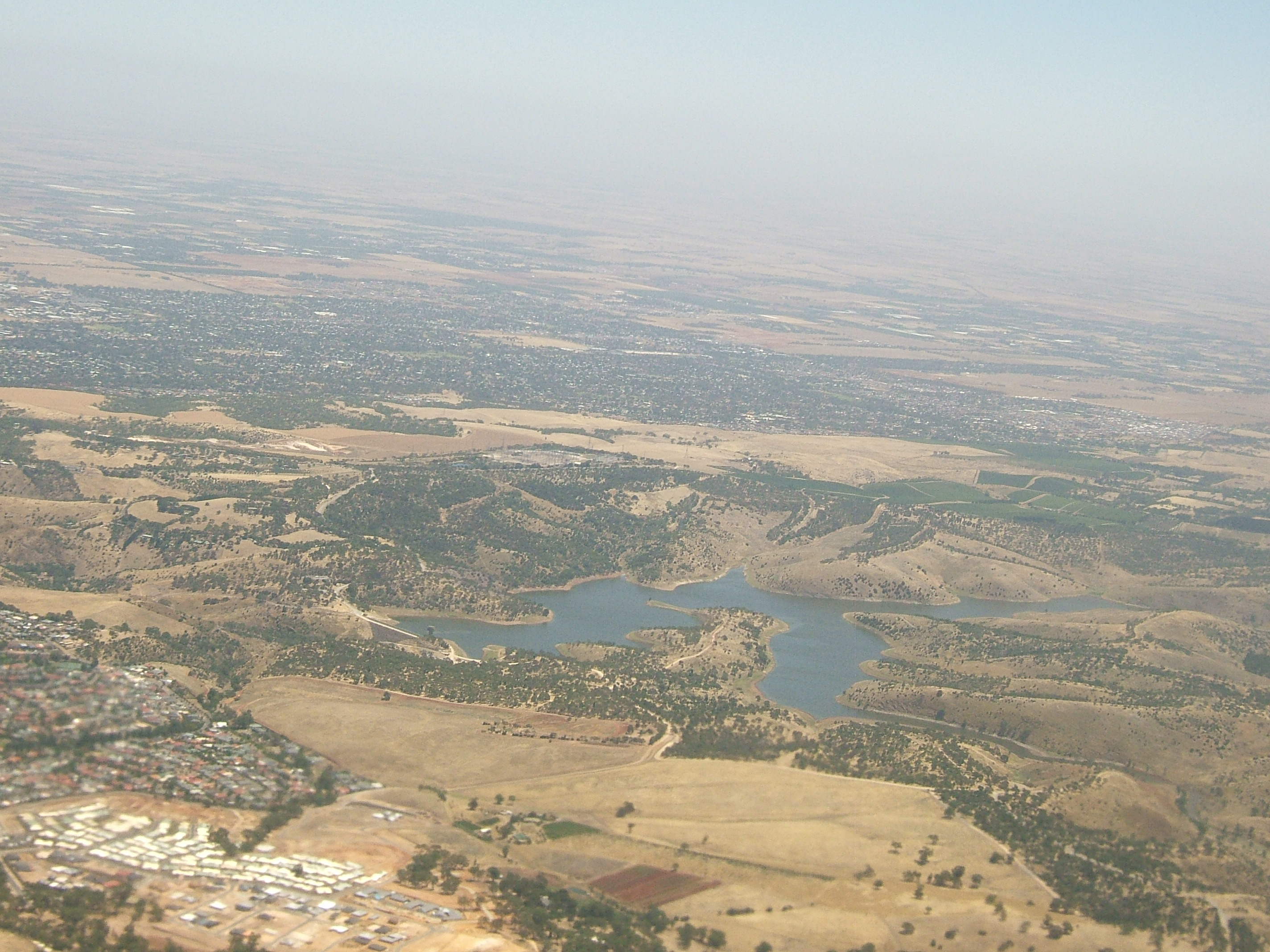
- The reservoir, looking towards the northwest. The built-up area in the bottom left corner is Greenwith. The dark dotted areas in the background are the northern suburbs of Adelaide, corresponding to the City of Playford centred around Elizabeth and the Adelaide Plains are further in the background.

- Location of the dam in Adelaide
- Country: Australia
- Location: Adelaide Plains, South Australia
- Coordinates: 34°45′15″S 138°43′13″E
- Purpose: Water supply
- Status: Operational
- Construction began: 1974
- Opening date: 1977
- Construction cost: A$11.5 million
- Owner: Government of South Australia
- Operator: SA Water

Dam and spillways
- Type of dam: Rock-fill dam
- Impounds: Little Para River
- Height (foundation): 53 m (174 ft)
- Length: 225 m (738 ft)
- Dam volume: 288×10^{3} m^{3} (10.2×10^{6} cu ft)
- Spillway type: Uncontrolled
- Spillway capacity: 450 m^{3}/s (16,000 cu ft/s)

Reservoir
- Creates: Little Para Reservoir
- Total capacity: 20.8 GL (16,900 acre⋅ft)
- Catchment area: 83 km^{2} (32 sq mi)
- Surface area: 125 ha (310 acres)
- Normal elevation: 138 m (453 ft) AHD

The Little Para Dam is an rock-filled embankment dam across the Little Para River, in the hills behind Salisbury Heights and Greenwith, in north-eastern Adelaide, South Australia. Completed in 1977, the resultant reservoir, the Little Para Reservoir, was established to supply potable water for the city of Adelaide and for flood mitigation.

== Overview ==
The dam was built between 1974 and 1977, costing A$11.5 million, and commissioned in January 1979. As the Little Para's catchment is insufficient to fill the reservoir, it is mainly used to store water pumped from the River Murray. Periodically water is released from the reservoir into the river, enabling refreshing of ground water.

The rock-filled dam wall is 53 metres (174 ft) high and 225 metres (738 ft) long. When full, the reservoir has capacity of 20.8 gigalitres (16,900 acre⋅ft) and covers 125 hectares (310 acres), drawn from a catchment area of 83 square kilometres (32 sq mi). The uncontrolled spillway has a flow capacity of 450 cubic metres per second (16,000 cu ft/s).

=== Upgrade ===
In June 2008 the reservoir was closed to the public so the dam wall could be strengthened and increased by 1 metre (3.3 ft). Construction of a new fusegate spillway system was also carried out. Millions of litres of water were released from the reservoir until it was at 68 percent to enable the construction to proceed. As of February 2011 the reservoir was closed to the public, due to the upgrade.

== Recreation ==
Overlooking the reservoir is a public park with tennis courts, playgrounds, public toilets and information about the initial construction of the dam. Although much of the current amenities have fallen into disarray due lack of maintenance and public abuse.

== See also ==
- List of reservoirs and dams in South Australia
