= Little Para River =

Little Para
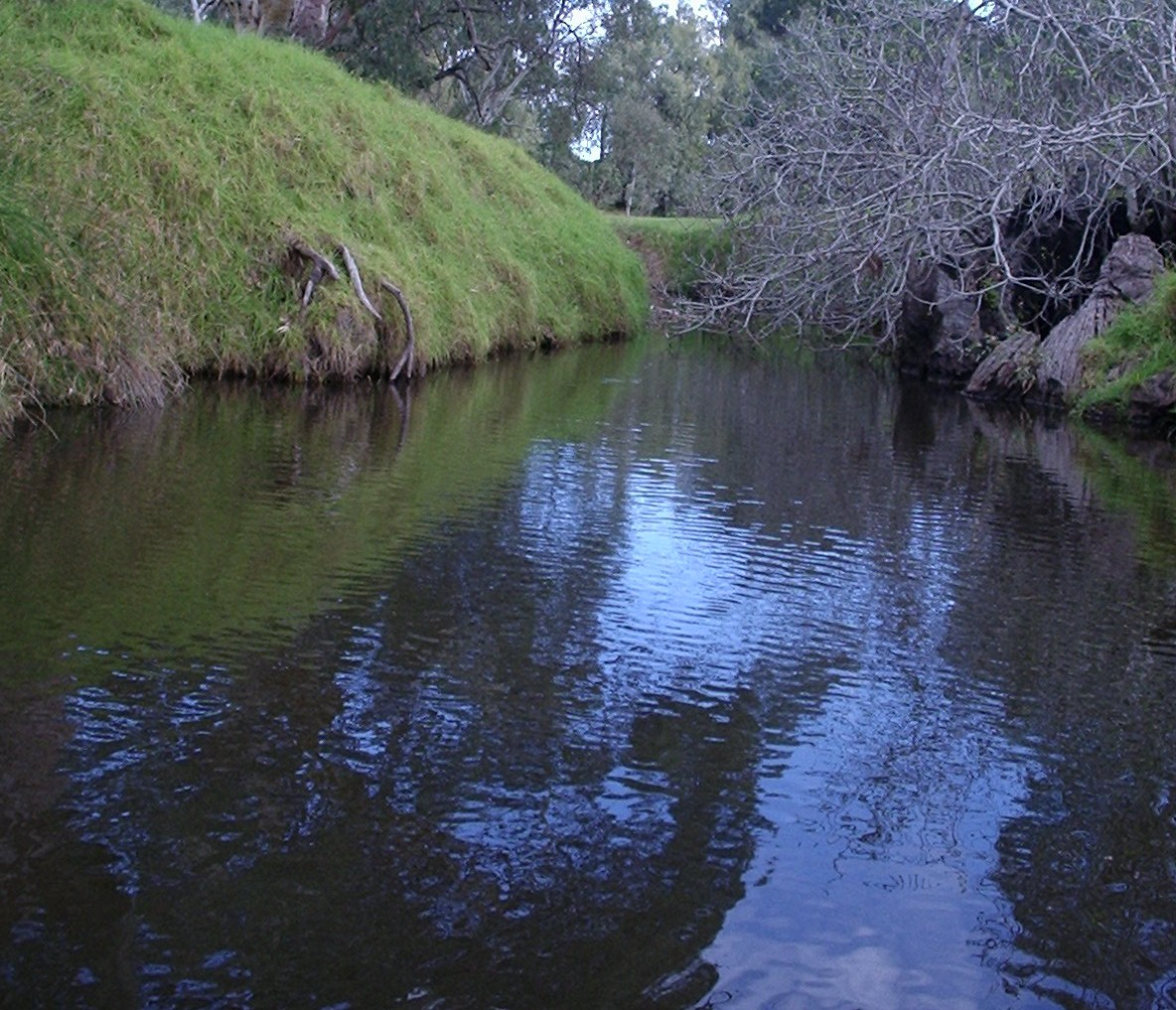
- Little Para River, Carisbrooke Reserve, Salisbury Park

- Location of the river mouth in South Australia
- Etymology: Kaurna language: Pari, meaning "a stream of flowing water"

Location
- Country: Australia
- State: South Australia
- Region: Adelaide Plains

Physical characteristics
- Source: Mount Lofty Range
  - location: near Lower Hermitage
  - elevation: 284 m (932 ft)
- Mouth: Gulf St Vincent
  - location: Globe Derby Park
  - coordinates: 34°46′S 138°36′E
  - elevation: 0 m (0 ft)
- Length: 29 km (18 mi)
- Discharge
  - average: 36 m^{3}/s (1,300 cu ft/s)
  - minimum: 0 m^{3}/s (0 cu ft/s)
  - maximum: 204 m^{3}/s (7,200 cu ft/s)

Basin features
- Reservoir: Little Para Reservoir

The Little Para River is a seasonal creek running across the Adelaide Plains in the Australian state of South Australia, whose catchment fills reservoirs that supply some of the water needs of Adelaide’s northern suburbs.

== Course and features ==
It runs from its source near Lower Hermitage in the Mount Lofty Ranges, flows north westerly to the Little Para Reservoir and then westerly to the Barker Inlet via Swan Creek and into Gulf St Vincent at Globe Derby Park . The lower portion of the river is badly affected by human activity and stormwater runoff but the upper reaches have a good range of biodiversity. The river descends 279 metres (915 ft) over its 29-kilometre (18 mi) course.

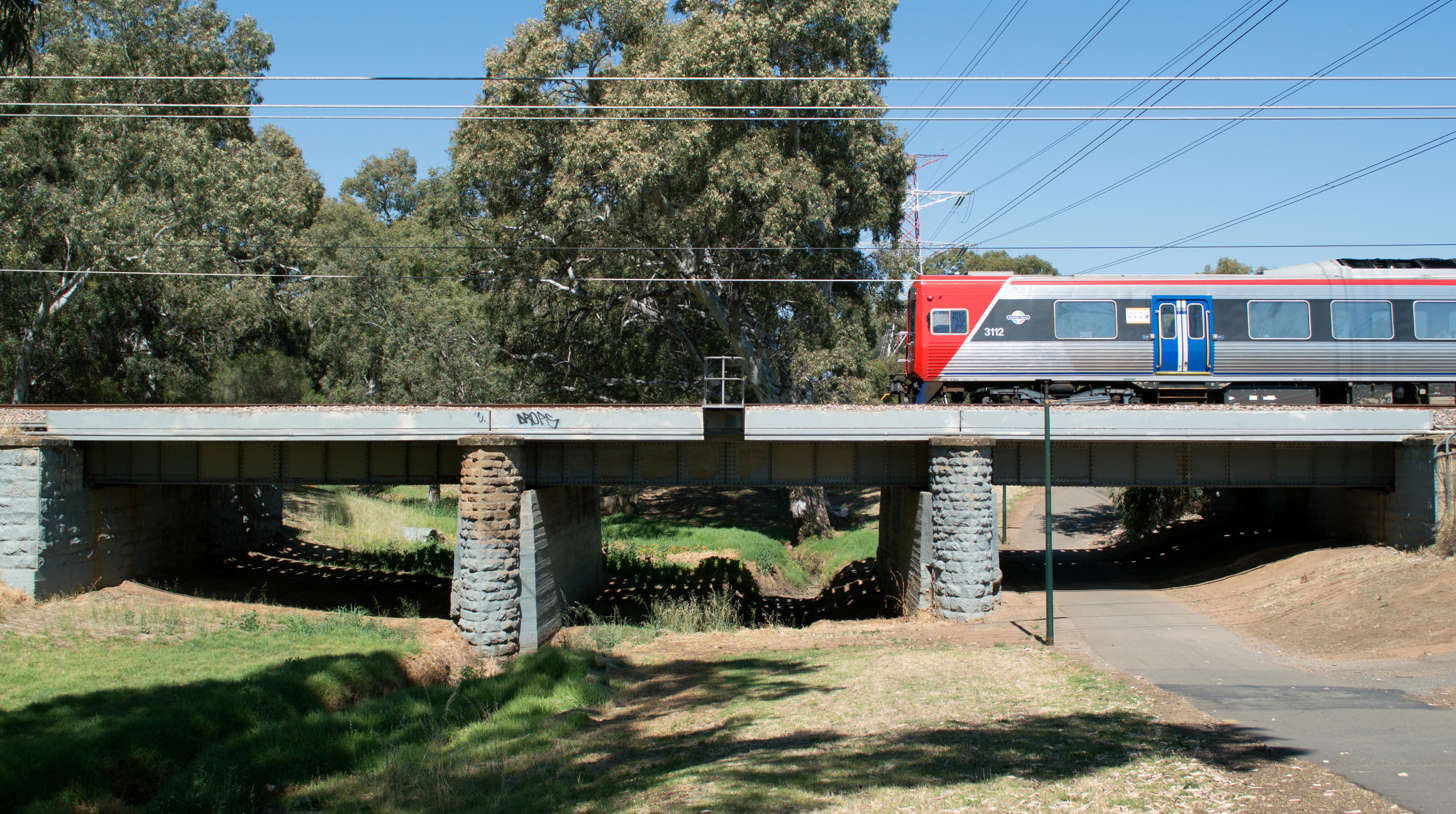
Gawler Line rail bridge over the Little Para River in Salisbury

As the river flows down from the Adelaide Hills over the Para fault escarpment, it has formed a large alluvial fan on which Salisbury is built. The river is narrow and winding, formerly flooded in heavy rain and rarely reaches its sea outlet. Over time the river has been widened and levees added to reduce this flooding. In the 19th century lack of consistent flow in the river and the absence of an organised water supply system led to the digging of wells. The Little Para refreshes the well's water, mostly held in clay, sand and gravel layers up to 61 metres (200 ft) deep. The Little Para Reservoir is built in the path of the river for water storage and flood mitigation. As the river's catchment is insufficient to fill the reservoir, it is mainly used to store water pumped from the River Murray. Periodically water is released from the reservoir into the river, enabling refreshing of ground water.

== Etymology ==
The river’s name is based directly on the Kaurna word pari which means river. The "little" descriptor is to distinguish it from the North Para and South Para rivers which converge into the Gawler River approximately 16 km (9.9 mi) to the north.

== History ==
In 1838 John Barton Hack shared with Colonel George Gawler and Thomas Williams in a 4,000-acre (1,600 ha) Special Survey nearby at £1 per acre. Hack established a dairy there and transported butter south to the city.

The river attracted John Harvey to form his settlement at Salisbury in 1847 and was crucial to the development of the citrus industry from 1852. Orange groves and lemon and almond trees were spread along the banks; several of the growers' residences are still in existence. In the 1960s the City of Salisbury began acquiring land for public space, and a belt of parklands with biking and walking trails now borders the river.

In recent decades, efforts by local councils and volunteer groups have focused on stabilising the riverbanks and re-establishing native vegetation, especially along stretches previously colonised by willows and pepper trees. These rehabilitation works have created a mosaic of habitats, where river red gums shelter freshwater shrimp and the occasional rakali, and where boardwalks allow visitors to wander through wetlands less than a generation old. Although the Little Para remains a modest and often overlooked watercourse, its restored corridors now serve as ecological stepping stones across an increasingly urbanised landscape, linking the foothills to the tidal flats of the gulf.

== See also ==
- List of rivers of Australia § South Australia
