= St Clair, South Australia =

St Clair
- Suburb
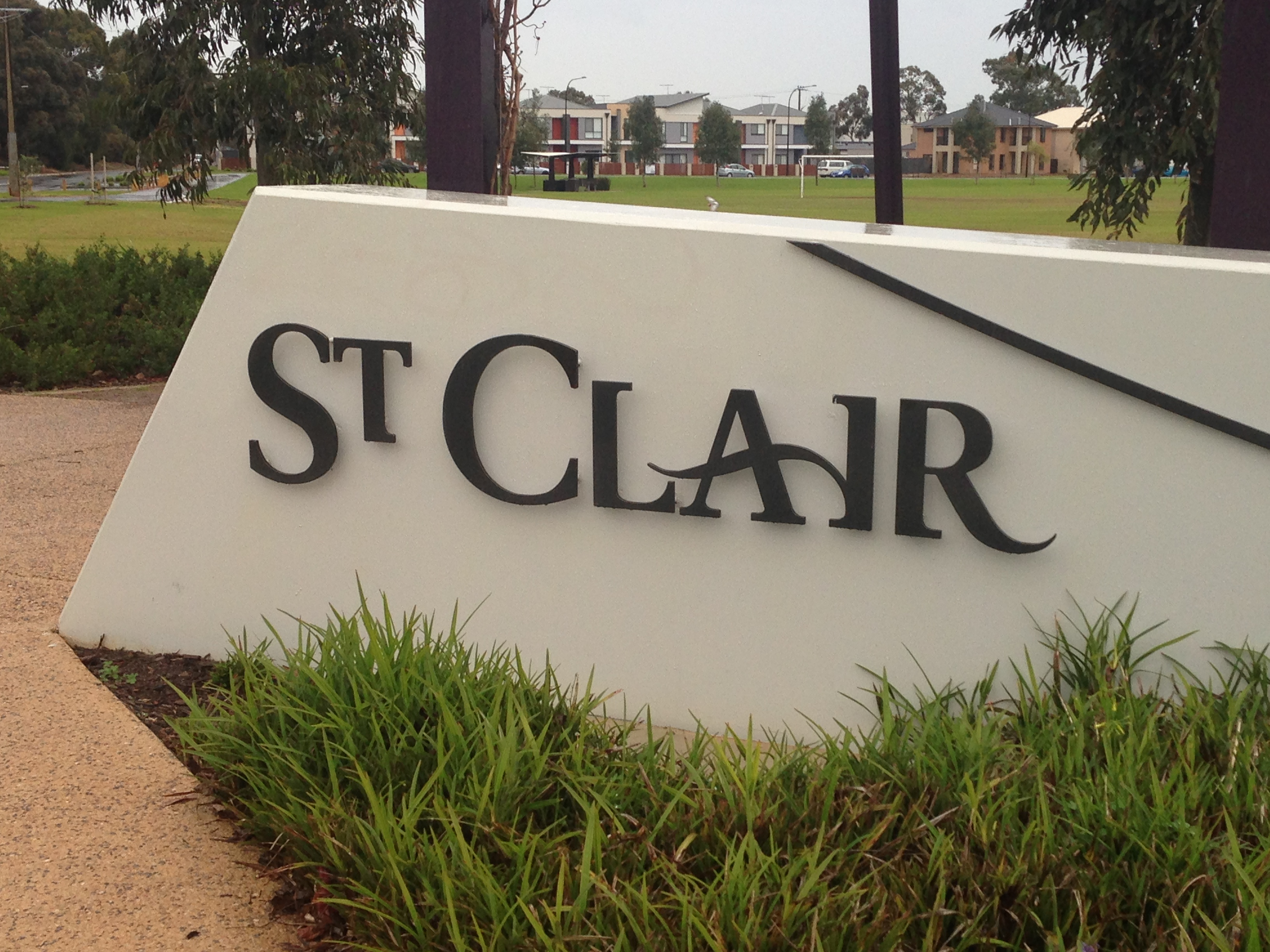
- Entrance Sign on Actil Avenue

- Interactive map of St Clair
- Country: Australia
- State: South Australia
- LGA: City of Charles Sturt
- Established: 2012

Government
  - State electorate: Cheltenham
  - Federal division: Hindmarsh

Population
  - Total: 2,634 (SAL 2021)
- Postcode: 5011
Suburbs around St Clair
Cheltenham	Pennington	Athol Park
Cheltenham	St Clair	Woodville North
Albert Park	Woodville	Woodville North

St Clair is a suburb of Adelaide, South Australia, and administered by the City of Charles Sturt. St Clair is geographically located with in the Hundred of Yatala, and was first recorded as the name for the suburb on 6 November 2012 by the Surveyor General of South Australia. The suburb is bounded by Cheltenham Parade, Torrens Road, Woodville Road and the Outer Harbor train line. The Cheltenham Park Racecourse was located here up until the late 2000s and new houses were built in the years after that.

== History ==
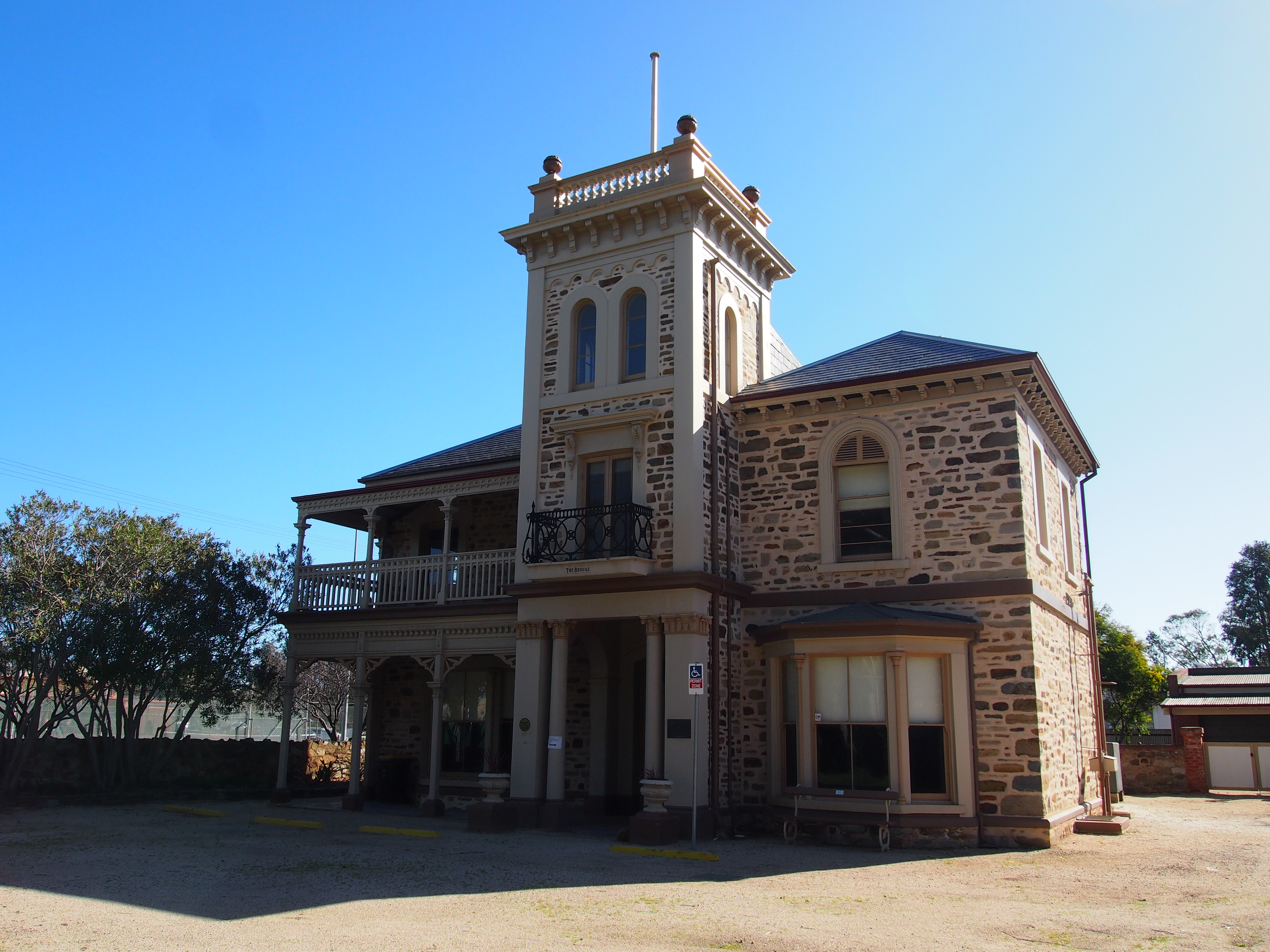
The Brocas museum at 111 Woodville Road, St Clair, built in 1840 as the residence for John Newman, was formerly in the adjacent suburb of Woodville and forms an important part of the latter's heritage.

The name "St Clair" was chosen to reflect the history of the surrounding area. It was first used by Robert Richard Torrens as the name for the house he built in the area circa 1842. In 1850 the original house was demolished and a grander house also bearing the name "St Clair" was built adjacent the current Woodville road, this house survived into the mid 20th century.

In 2007 the South Australian Jockey Club signed a deal with developers AVJennings and Urban Pacific to develop the former Cheltenham Park Racecourse for housing. St Clair Village was opened on 1 May 2013 by the Premier of South Australia Jay Weatherill. The centre is home to a Coles Supermarket and 10 speciality shops. Construction work on the new St Clair station on the Outer Harbor railway line commenced in June 2013, with the station opening on 23 February 2014.

== Homestead controversy ==
'St Clair' is also the name of the longstanding local park adjacent to the new suburb. The land was originally part of Bower's Estate, on which the St Clair homestead also stood on Woodville Road. The St Clair homestead was later compulsorily acquired by the council and demolished to make way for the St Clair Recreation Centre. In 2008 the Charles Sturt Council proposed a land swap between 4.7 hectares of the Reserve (including the St Clair Oval) with an adjoining contaminated site on the former Actil factory land. This was proposed to allow residential development on the parklands and Oval site. Despite community opposition, including a legal challenge by a group of local residents, the land swap proceeded in late 2009.

The Council voted 13 to 3 to proceed with the land swap and transfer the land to the State Government's Land Management Corporation (now known as Renewal SA). This was despite concerns raised by local residents over the unequal nature of the swap (in both land value and open space) and the loss of the park. As of July 2013, the original park remains undeveloped. The Parliament's Upper House has voted to launch another inquiry into the swap and the South Australian chapter of the Returned Service League has voted to support the motion to have the original park retained as a war memorial, both to realise the 1942 petition, and to honour the scattered ashes of war veterans.'

== Politics ==
St Clair is part of Woodville Ward in the City of Charles Sturt local government area. It also lies in the state electoral district of Cheltenham and the federal electoral division of Port Adelaide.

== Notable people ==
Some notable people include: Jay Weatherill, former premier of South Australia.
