= Woodville West, South Australia =

Woodville West
- Suburb
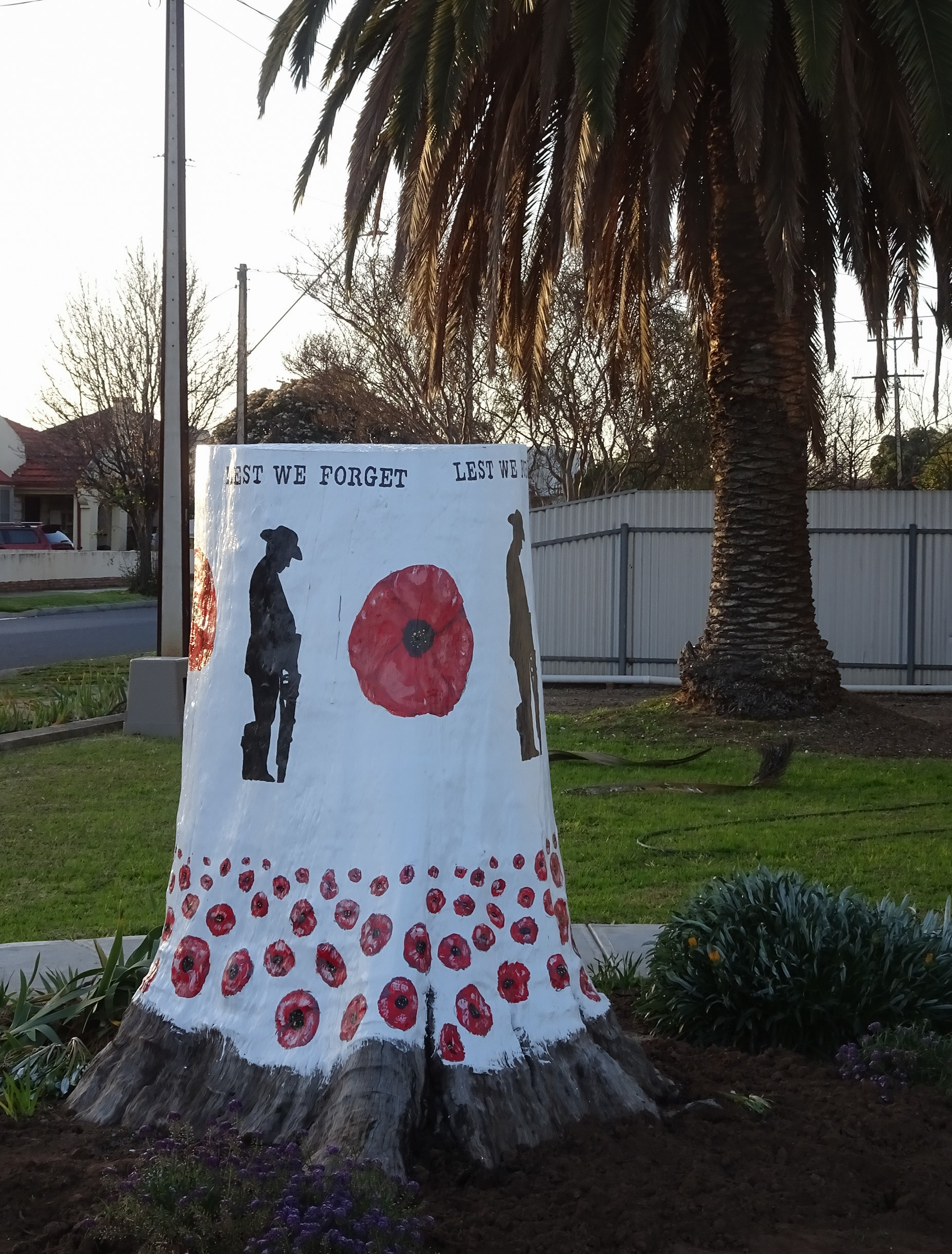
- Remembrance Day Memorial

- Interactive map of Woodville West
- Country: Australia
- State: South Australia
- City: Adelaide
- LGA: City of Charles Sturt
- Location: 9 km (5.6 mi) from Adelaide

Government
  - State electorate: Cheltenham
  - Federal division: Hindmarsh

Population
  - Total: 3,854 (SAL 2021)
- Postcode: 5011
Suburbs around Woodville West
| Albert Park | Cheltenham | Woodville |
| Seaton | Woodville West | Woodville South |
| Seaton | Findon | Woodville South |

Woodville West is a suburb of Adelaide, situated about 9 kilometres northwest of the Central Business District. It lies within the City of Charles Sturt. The postcode of Woodville West is 5011. Woodville West is bounded by the railway line and Port Road in the north, Findon Road in the east, Trimmer Parade, Todville Street and Minns Street East in the south, and Frank Mitchell Park, Agnes Street and the railway line in the west. As of 2011, Renewal SA and the City of Charles Sturt have been implementing the Woodville West Neighbourhood Renewal Project, which involves an $130m property development.

== History ==
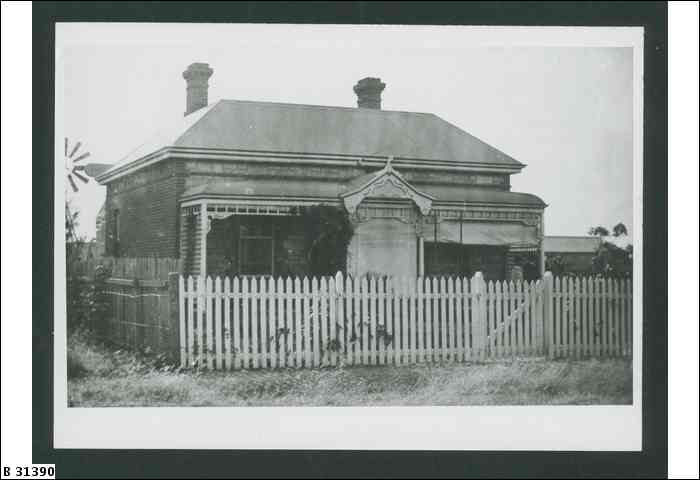
Residence on Green Road, Woodville West ca. 1908

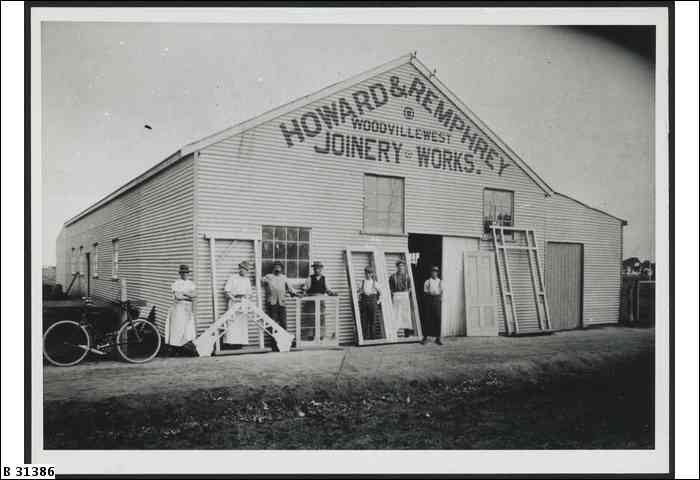
Joinery Works, Woodville West ca. 1910

Colonial settlement of the area dates from the mid-1800s, with growth during the 1870s and 1880s. In February 1879, the township of Woodville West was advertised for sale in allotments, with one advertisement stating, "the township of Woodville West is pleasantly situated on the western side of the Port Road, and has the great advantages of easy communication with the port by means of the Alberton and Queenstown Tramway, with the city by trains passing every 45 minutes, the Woodville Station, and with the sea by the Grange and Military Road Railway. The soil is very fertile and well adapted for gardening."

Some growth took place during the interwar period. The most significant development occurred during the post-war years, particularly during the 1950s and 1960s. The population declined slightly during the 1990s, and then fluctuated slightly between 2001 and 2011, a result of small changes in dwelling stock and the average number of persons living in each dwelling. Woodville West Post Office opened on 3 February 1947 and closed in 1986.

== Demographics ==
Woodville West is an established residential area. As of 2021, the median age of Woodville West residents was 35. There are an average of 2.4 residents per dwelling, with an average of 1.7 children per family. The median weekly household income is $1,669 and the median weekly rent is $330.

Aboriginal and Torres Strait Islander people make up 1.7% of the population. The most common ancestries in Woodville West were English (27.1%), Australian (25.6%), Italian (12.6%), Irish (6.9%) and Scottish (6.6%). 67.0% of people were born in Australia. The most common other countries of birth were India (6.6%), England (2.6%), Philippines (1.7%), Italy (1.4%) and Vietnam (1.1%). The most common religious affiliations in Woodville West were No Religion (36.0%), Catholic (25.2%), Eastern Orthodox (6.3%) and Hinduism (4.4%).

The most common occupations in Woodville West included Professionals (22.7%), Clerical and Administrative Workers (14.3%), Community and Personal Service Workers (13.4%), Technicians and Trades Workers (12.9%) Managers (10.8%). Woodville West has a 4.5% unemployment rate.

== Politics ==
Woodville West is part of West Woodville Ward in the City of Charles Sturt local government area.

Woodville West lies in the state electoral district of Cheltenham and the federal electoral division of Port Adelaide.

== Facilities ==
Woodville Day Nursery and Kindergarten is located in Woodville West.

There are two churches in the area, Woodville West Lutheran Church and St Peters and St Pauls Jacobite Syrian Orthodox Church.

On the western side of Woodville West is Frank Mitchell Park/Woodville West Reserve, which features public BBQs, play equipment, and sports facilities. On the southern side of Woodville is Smith Reserve, which features a picnic area, play equipment, and sports facilities.
