= Port Road, Adelaide =

Road in Adelaide, Australia

Port Road South Australia
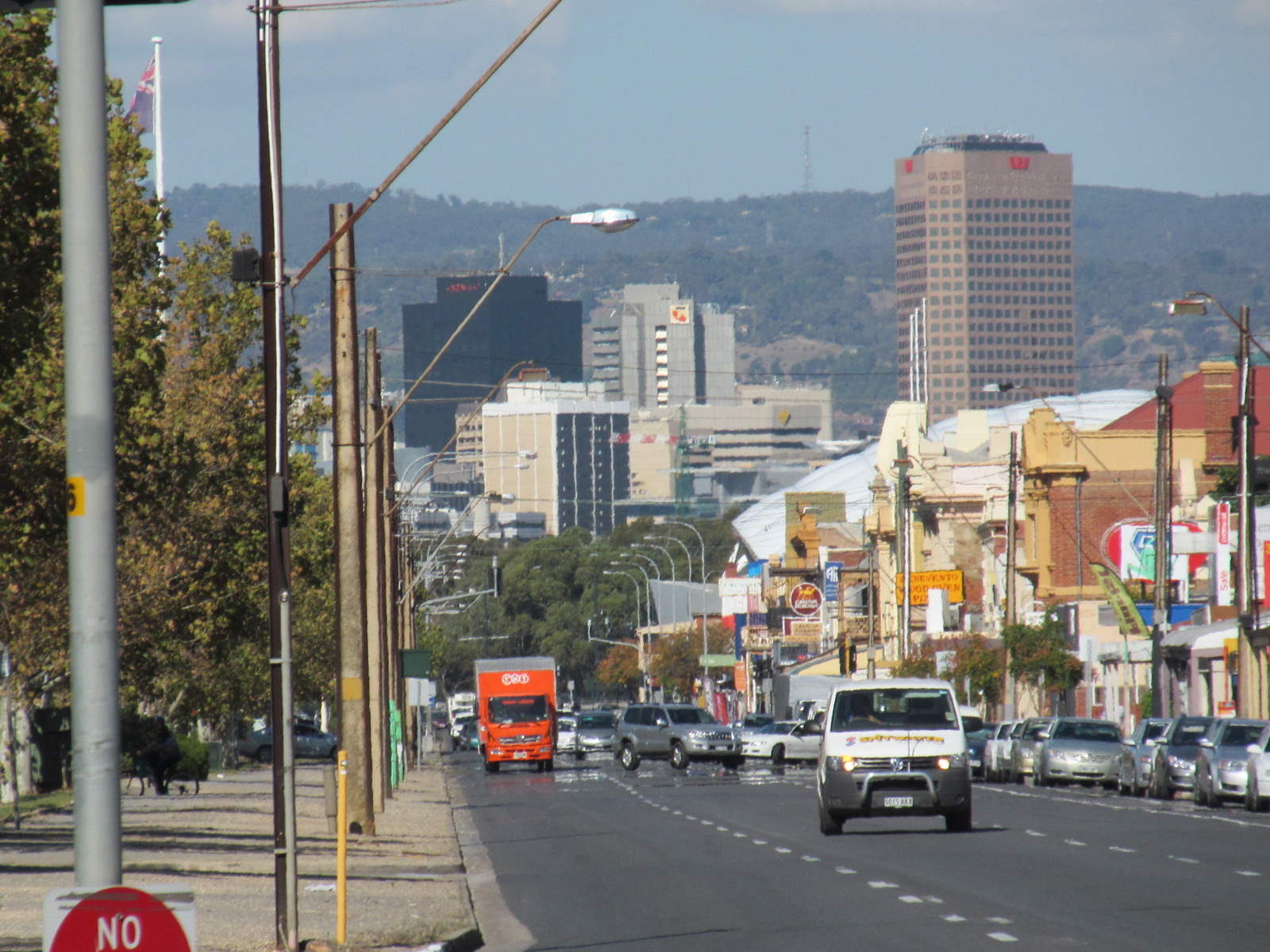
- Looking towards the Adelaide city centre from Port Road in Hindmarsh
- Coordinates: 34.922112°S 138.587273°E (Southeast end); 34.844337°S 138.505362°E (Northwest end)

General information
- Type: Road
- Location: Adelaide
- Length: 12.0 km (7.5 mi)
- Route number(s): R1 (2017–present) (through Thebarton); A7 (1998–present) (Hindmarsh–Port Adelaide)
- Former route number: A21 (1998–2017) (Adelaide–Thebarton)

Major junctions
- Southeast end: North Terrace; West Terrace; Adelaide
- Park Terrace; North–South Motorway; East Avenue; Tapleys Hill Road; Grand Junction Road
- Northwest end: St Vincent Street; Port Adelaide, Adelaide

Location(s)
- Region: Eastern Adelaide, Western Adelaide
- Major suburbs: Thebarton, Hindmarsh, Beverley, Woodville, Albert Park, Cheltenham, Alberton

Port Road (and its northern section as Commercial Road through Port Adelaide) is a major road in Adelaide, South Australia connecting the Adelaide city centre with Port Adelaide. It is 12 km (7.5 mi) long, and is designated part of route R1 within central Adelaide, and beyond as route A7.

== Route ==
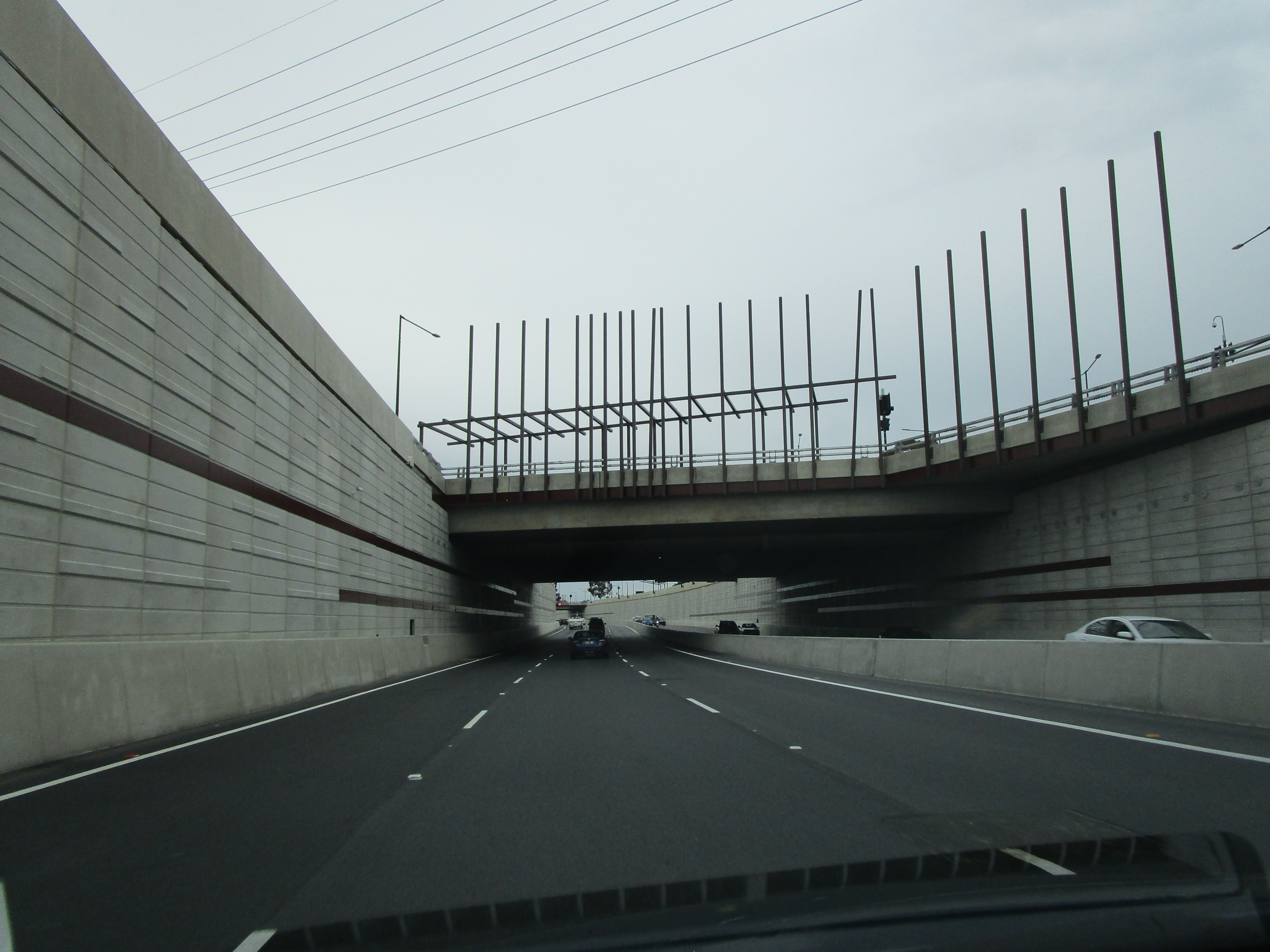
Southbound on the North-South Motorway, under Port Road bridge

Port Road starts at the north-western corner of the Adelaide city centre, at the intersection of North Terrace and West Terrace, and heads northwest, turning north at Thebarton to become part of the City Ring Route, before meeting Park Terrace at Hindmarsh and heading northwest again with its widened median, crossing the North-South Motorway and heading through the suburbs of Woodville and Cheltenham, before it turns northwards at Alberton to cross Grand Junction Road, changing name to Commercial Road and terminating not long afterwards in the centre of Port Adelaide.

== History ==
The road includes a very wide median strip, giving a total width of approximately 70 metres. The original design was conceived soon after the establishment of Adelaide, was to accommodate a standard road and a canal, with the canal later replaced in the plans by a railway line. The canal and railway line were never created in the road allotment: the railway line when built in 1853 was built approximately 1 km to the east. Since the extension of the Glenelg tram line in 2009–10, 200 metres of median strip at the city end is occupied by tram lines.

Location of Port Road in Adelaide.

In the 1968 Metropolitan Adelaide Transport Study (MATS plan), the road was destined to be upgraded to become the Port Freeway. The plan fell through, yet in 2005 the Government of South Australia announced a 600 m tunnel for South Road below Port Road and the railway line. The Torrens Road to River Torrens project to upgrade South Road to include a free-flowing road in a trench under Port Road and several other intersections started construction in 2015 and was completed by the end of 2018.

Some routes in Adelaide were renumbered in 2017. Port Road had been designated route A21 (city ring route) between West Terrace and Park Terrace. After the change, the West Terrace end is not numbered, and it bears route R1 (city ring route) between James Congdon Drive and Park Terrace.

== Major intersections ==
| LGA | Location | km | mi | Destinations | Notes |
|---|---|---|---|---|---|
| Adelaide | Adelaide | 0.0 | 0.0 | North Terrace (east) – Adelaide CBD; West Terrace (south) – Adelaide CBD | Southeastern terminus of Port Road |
| Adelaide–West Torrens boundary | Thebarton–North Adelaide boundary | 1.0 | 0.62 | James Congdon Drive (R1 south) – Mile End, Keswick | Route R1 continues north along Port Road |
| River Torrens | | 2.0 | 1.2 | Hindmarsh Bridge | |
| Adelaide–Charles Sturt boundary | Hindmarsh–North Adelaide boundary | 2.1 | 1.3 | Park Terrace (R1 northeast) – North Adelaide, Medindie, Kent Town; Adam Street (west) – West Hindmarsh | Route R1 continues northeast along Park Terrace; Southeastern terminus of route A7 |
| Charles Sturt | Hindmarsh–West Hindmarsh–Croydon tripoint | 3.3 | 2.1 | South Road, to North–South Motorway (M2) – Wingfield, Waterloo Corner | |
| Charles Sturt | Allenby Gardens–Beverley–West Croydon boundary | 5.1 | 3.2 | East Avenue (A14) – Underdale, Plympton, Darlington | |
| Charles Sturt | Beverley–Kilkenny–Woodville Park boundary | 5.4 | 3.4 | Kilkenny Road – Kilkenny | |
| Charles Sturt | Albert Park–Woodville South–Woodville boundary | 7.7 | 4.8 | Grange railway line | |
| Charles Sturt | Albert Park–Cheltenham–Woodville boundary | 7.8 | 4.8 | Cheltenham Parade (north) – Pennington; West Lakes Boulevard (southwest) – West Lakes, Football Park | |
| Charles Sturt–Port Adelaide Enfield boundary | Albert Park–Queenstown–Cheltenham boundary | 9.0 | 5.6 | Old Port Road | |
| Port Adelaide Enfield | Queenstown–Alberton boundary | 9.7 | 6.0 | Tapleys Hill Road (A15) – Glenelg, Brighton, Port Noarlunga | |
| Port Adelaide Enfield | Alberton–Port Adelaide boundary | 11.0 | 6.8 | Grand Junction Road (A16) – Gepps Cross, Northfield, Hope Valley | Name change: Port Road (south), Commercial Road (north) |
| Port Adelaide Enfield | Port Adelaide | 11.4 | 7.1 | Outer Harbor railway line | |
| Port Adelaide Enfield | Port Adelaide | 12.0 | 7.5 | St Vincent Street – Port Adelaide, New Port | Northwestern terminus of Commercial Road and route A7 |
Route transition
