= Findon, South Australia =

Findon
- Suburb
- Country: Australia
- State: South Australia
- City: Adelaide
- LGA: City of Charles Sturt
- Location: 6.5 km (4.0 mi) NW of Adelaide city centre
- Established: 1848

Government
  - State electorate: Cheltenham (2014)
  - Federal division: Hindmarsh
- Elevation: 12 m (39 ft)

Population
  - Total: 6,997 (SAL 2021)
- Postcode: 5023
Suburbs around Findon
Seaton	Woodville West	Woodville South
Seaton	Findon	Beverley
Kidman Park	Kidman Park	Flinders Park

Findon is a western suburb of Adelaide, South Australia. It is located in the City of Charles Sturt.

== History ==
In 1839, George Cortis was granted the land now constituting Findon, which he subdivided in 1848. The suburb may have been named for the town of Findon, United Kingdom, near Cortis' hometown of Worthing.

== Geography ==
Findon lies astride Crittenden and Findon roads, in Adelaide's western suburbs. Grange Road forms its southern boundary.

== Demographics ==
The 2016 Census by the Australian Bureau of Statistics counted 6,205 persons in Findon on census night. Of these, 47.7% were male and 52.3% were female.

60.9% of people were born in Australia. The next most common countries of birth were India 6.1%, Italy 6.1% and England 2.3%. 58.3% of people spoke only English at home. Other languages spoken at home included Italian 9.9%, Greek 3.4% and Punjabi 2.7%.

The most common responses for religion were Catholic 33.3% and No Religion 22.3%

== Politics ==
=== Local government ===
Findon is part of Findon and Beverley wards in the City of Charles Sturt local government area, being represented in that council by Doriana Coppola and Joe Ienco (Findon), and by Edgar Agius and Mick Harley (Beverley).

=== State and federal ===
Findon lies in the state electoral district of Cheltenham and the federal electoral division of Port Adelaide. The suburb is represented in the South Australian House of Assembly by Joe Szakacs and federally by Mark Butler.

== Community ==
=== Community groups ===
Findon Community Centre is located on Findon Road.

=== Schools ===
Findon High School is on Drummond Avenue. Nazareth Catholic College Primary and Early Childhood Centre are on Crittenden Road.

=== Church ===
The Catholic Church in Findon is dedicated to Our Lady of the Manger.

== Facilities and attractions ==
=== Parks ===
Findon Oval, home of the Woodville District Baseball Club in summer months, and the Woodville Lacrosse Club in winter months, is located on Drummond Avenue, beside Findon Cycle Speedway, home of the Findon Skid Kids cycling club.

The other main greenspace in the suburb is Matheson Reserve, between Buccleuch Avenue and Dominion Avenue.

Other parks and reserves are located on Findon Road, Strathbogie Avenue, Pamela Street, Rondo Avenue and Dampier Avenue.

Basa Reserve, mainly located in neighbouring Beverley, extends into the suburb.

=== Basketball ===
Findon is home to the 8,000 seat Adelaide Arena, home of the four time National Basketball League champions the Adelaide 36ers and home of five time Women's National Basketball League champions the Adelaide Lightning.

The A$16 million arena, the largest purpose built basketball stadium in Australia, opened in 1992 as the Clipsal Powerhouse before a change of sponsorship saw a name change to the Distinctive Homes Dome in 2002. This lasted until 2009 when it became known as The Dome, and in 2010 the venue was renamed the Adelaide Arena. The main basketball court at the arena is known as the Brett Maher Court in honour of 36ers games record holder and three-time championship winning captain Brett Maher.

== Transportation ==
=== Roads ===
Findon is primarily serviced by Findon Road and Crittenden Road, both of which pass through the suburb. Grange Road links Findon to Adelaide city centre and the coast.

=== Public transport ===
Findon is serviced by public transport run by the Adelaide Metro.

==== Buses ====
The suburb is serviced by buses run by the Adelaide Metro.

== See also ==
- List of Adelaide suburbs
