= Hendon, South Australia =

Hendon
- Suburb
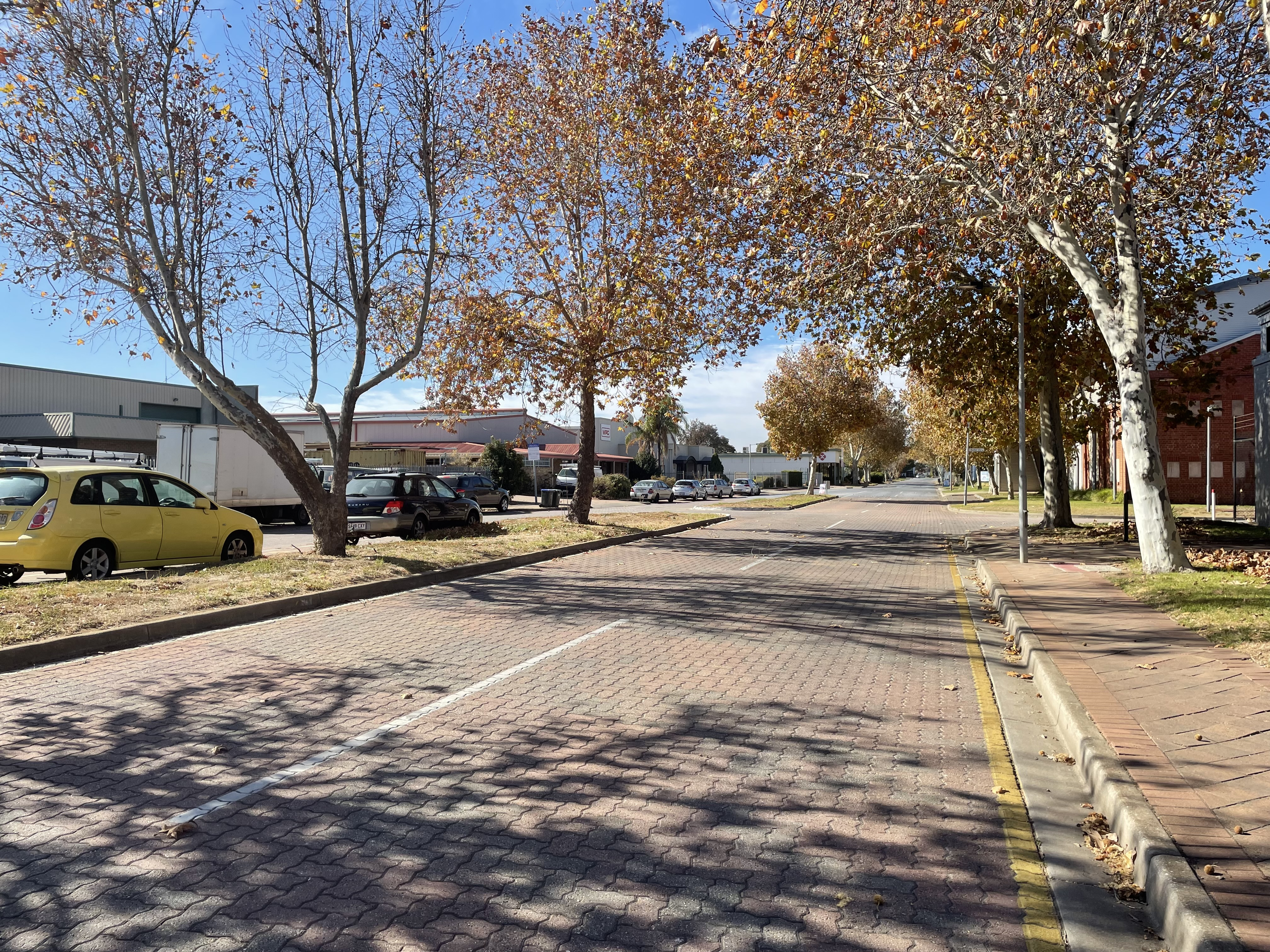
- Circuit Drive, Hendon

- Country: Australia
- State: South Australia
- City: Adelaide
- LGA: City of Charles Sturt
- Location: 9.8 km (6.1 mi) NE of Adelaide city centre
- Established: 1921

Government
  - State electorate: Cheltenham (2011)
  - Federal division: Hindmarsh

Population
  - Total: 1,271 (SAL 2021)
- Time zone: UTC+9:30 (ACST)
  - Summer (DST): UTC+10:30 (ACDT)
- Postcode: 5014
Suburbs around Hendon
Royal Park	Queenstown	Queenstown
Royal Park	Hendon	Albert Park
Seaton	Seaton	Albert Park

Hendon is a north-western suburb of Adelaide, South Australia, 9.8 km (6 mi) from the Adelaide city centre. It is located in the City of Charles Sturt.

== History ==
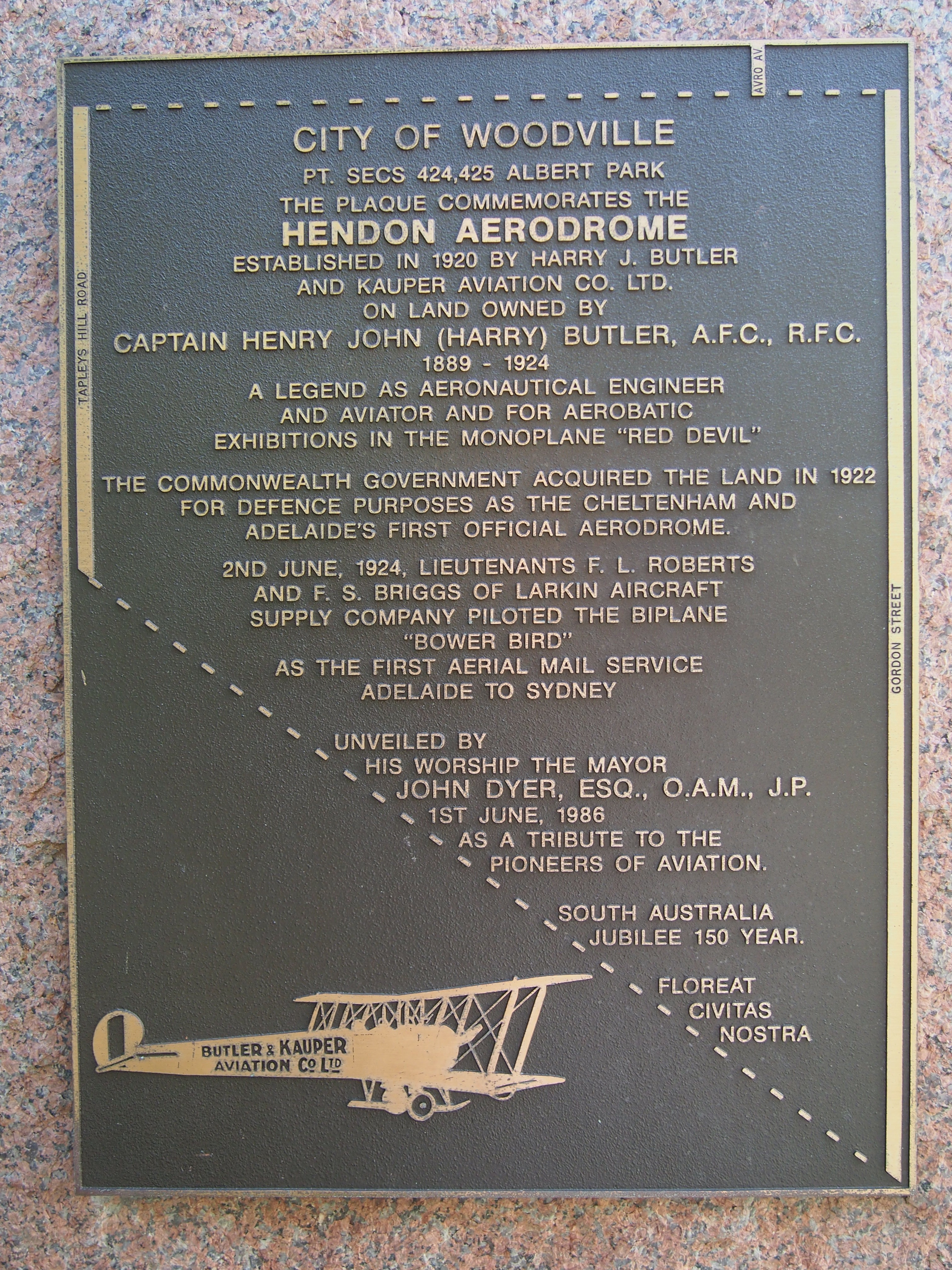
Hendon aerodrome plaque

Initially part of Albert Park in the district of Woodville, the new suburb of Hendon was laid out in 1921 by Wilkinson, Sands and Wyles Ltd, on part of the land previously owned by the aviator, Harry Butler, who established the adjacent aerodrome there in 1920. Consequently, several streets were named after aircraft.

The site of the "Hendon" aerodrome, also known as "Captain Butler's Aerodrome", was compulsorily acquired in July 1922 by the Civil Aviation branch of the Department of Defence, and used as the first "Adelaide Airport". By 1927 the site was becoming inadequate due to the increasing density of surrounding development and the erection of powerlines around its boundaries, so aviation operations were shifted to Parafield. The Commonwealth had originally intended to fund the development of Parafield Aerodrome through the subdivision and sale of the land at Hendon, but with the end of the 1920s economic boom, these plans lapsed and the site remained as a cow pasture.

Soon after the outbreak of World War II the still vacant former Hendon aerodrome was one of three sites in South Australia set up as munitions factories (the others were at nearby Finsbury, and Salisbury). The Hendon factory, used to manufacture small arms ammunition, was serviced by an adjacent railway station located on a spur from the Grange railway line; after the station's closure in 1980, the rail corridor was later reused for the easternmost section of West Lakes Boulevard.

By 1947 the entire site of the former munitions factory had been acquired by Philips Electrical Industries. This was a major accomplishment of the Playford Government, with the Hendon site becoming "the company's Australian headquarters, and as such, the country's largest producer of electronic components, and a major centre of technological skills and research". At its peak in the late 1950s the factory employed almost 3,500 skilled workers, mostly women, who were valued for their dexterity and patience. The company's activities were progressively reduced during the 1970s, but one notable feature of the period was the collaboration of the company with the Polish-Australian artist Stan Ostoja-Kotkowski, a pioneer of the use of laser, sound and image technology in art. The Philips factory was finally sold in 1980 to the Emanuel Group of Companies, becoming the "Hendon Industrial Park". Tenants at the site have included the South Australian Film Corporation, which operated the Hendon Studios from 1981 until production moved to new studios at Glenside in 2011.

=== Groundwater contamination ===
In 2012 concerns emerged about the pollution of groundwater beneath Hendon and surrounding suburbs, and in May 2012 residents were advised not to use bore water for any purpose. Contaminants including perchloroethene (PCE), trichloroethene (TCE), dichloroethene (DCE) and metals in groundwater and soil vapour had been detected, and noted by a consultants' report from 1992, which attributed the pollution to a former munitions manufacturing site on Philips Crescent. The Environment Protection Authority is now "working with site contamination consultants to better characterise the current nature and extent of the contamination, and to ascertain potential risks".

== Geography ==
Hendon lies between Old Port Road to the north and West Lakes Boulevard on the south. Its western boundary is formed by Tapleys Hill Road.

== Demographics ==
The 2021 Census by the Australian Bureau of Statistics counted 1,271 persons in Hendon on census night. Of these, 47.3% were male and 52.7% were female.

The majority of residents (69.8%) are of Australian birth, with other common census responses being India (3.8%), England (3.5%), Italy (2.6%), Greece (1.5%) and Bosnia and Herzegovina (1.5%).

== Politics ==
=== Local government ===
Hendon is part of West Woodville Ward in the City of Charles Sturt local government area, being represented in that council by Tolley Wasylenko and Kelly Thomas.

=== State and federal ===
Hendon lies in the state electoral district of Cheltenham and the federal electoral division of Hindmarsh. The suburb is represented in the South Australian House of Assembly by Joe Szakacs and federally by Mark Butler.

== Community ==
=== Parks ===
The suburb contains a number of parks including a reserve located between Gordon Street and Circuit Drive and another on DeHaviland Avenue.

=== Schools ===
Hendon Primary School is located in the adjoining suburb of Royal Park.

== Transportation ==
Hendon is serviced by Old Port Road, connecting the suburb to Adelaide city centre, and Tapleys Hill Road, which forms its western boundary.

Hendon is serviced by public transport run by the Adelaide Metro.

The Hendon railway line served Hendon from 1940 until 1980.

== See also ==
- List of Adelaide suburbs
