= Seaton High School =

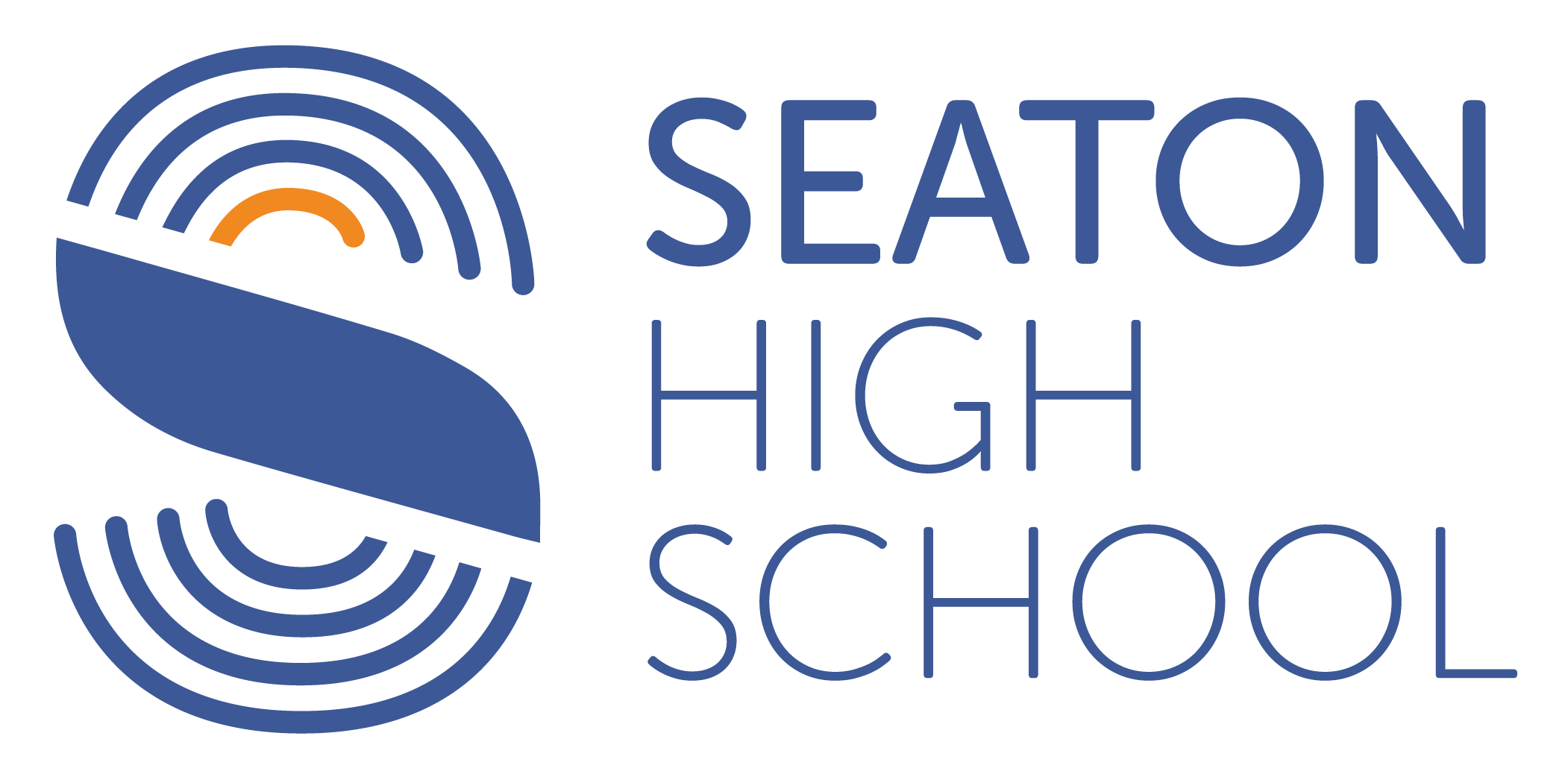

Location
- Glenburnie Street; Seaton, South Australia; Australia; 34.8855°S 138.505°E

Information
- Type: Public, Secondary
- Established: 1964
- Principal: Richard Abell
- Grades: 7–12
- Enrolment: 944 (2025)
- Colours: Blue and Orange
- Website: www.seatonhs.sa.edu.au

Seaton High School is a coeducational public secondary school based in Seaton, a suburb of the City of Charles Sturt in western Adelaide, South Australia. The school has a total enrolment of more than 900 students per year and a total staff of over 100.

The current Principal of Seaton High School is Richard Abell.

During the early 2020s, the school underwent major redevelopments through utilisation of a $20 million grant through the Department for Education's Better Schools Program. The development process was finalised prior to the introduction of the Year 7 cohort to the school in 2022.

== Facilities ==
Facilities at Seaton High School include:

- A STEM facility
- Trade Training Centre
- Specialist visual & performing arts’ spaces and a multimedia suite
- Gymnasium & Diamond Sports Training Centre
- Entrepreneurial Hub
- Research Hub
- Wellbeing Hub

== Curriculum ==
=== Specialist programs ===
Special interest programs available to students at Seaton High School include:

- Diamond Sports
- Emerging Technologies
- Students with High Intellectual Potential (SHIP)
- Visual Arts and Innovation
