= Electoral district of Cheltenham =

South Australian state electoral district

Cheltenham South Australia—House of Assembly
- Interactive map of electoral district boundaries from the 2022 state election (Note: The electorate will have no change in boundaries at the 2026 state election.)
- State: South Australia
- Created: 1998
- MP: Joe Szakacs
- Party: Labor
- Namesake: Cheltenham
- Electors: 26,403 (2019)
- Area: 17.49 km^{2} (6.8 sq mi)
- Demographic: Metropolitan
- Coordinates: 34°52′42″S 138°31′31″E
Electorates around Cheltenham:
Port Adelaide	Port Adelaide	Port Adelaide
Lee	Cheltenham	Croydon
Colton	West Torrens	West Torrens

Cheltenham is a single-member electoral district for the South Australian House of Assembly. Named after the suburb of the same name, it is a 17.5 km² suburban electorate in Adelaide's north-west, taking in the suburbs of Albert Park, Alberton, Beverley, Cheltenham, Findon, Hendon, Pennington, Queenstown, St Clair, Woodville, Woodville North, Woodville Park, Woodville South, Woodville West, and part of Rosewater. The Cheltenham electorate is inside the federal-level electorate of Hindmarsh.

Cheltenham was created in the 1998 electoral distribution as a safe Labor seat, replacing the abolished seat of Price. In August 2001 the 17-year Price incumbent Murray De Laine was defeated in a factional preselection in favour of future premier Jay Weatherill. De Laine subsequently contested the 2002 election as an independent with 9.7% of the primary vote.

In the 2016 electoral boundary redistribution, the suburbs of Beverley and Woodville Park were added to the seat from Croydon district, while Athol Park was lost to Croydon district, Royal Park was lost to Lee district and portions of Port Adelaide and Rosewater shifted into Port Adelaide district.

The current member is Joe Szakacs of the Labor Party. Szakacs was elected in the 2019 Cheltenham state by-election on 9 February, replacing former premier Jay Weatherill.

== Members for Cheltenham ==
Member	Party	Term
Jay Weatherill	Labor	2002–2018
Joe Szakacs	Labor	2019–present

== Election results ==
2026 South Australian state election: Cheltenham
Party	Candidate	Votes	%	±%
Labor	Joe Szakacs	11,434	47.8	−7.7
One Nation	Melissa Higgins	5,045	21.1	+21.1
Greens	Steffi Medrow	3,159	13.2	+2.4
Liberal	Helen Pike	2,195	9.2	−15.3
Independent	Kosta Hadjimarkou	809	3.4	+3.4
Family First	Alex Tennikoff	569	2.4	−4.1
Fair Go	Karoline Brown	418	1.7	+1.7
Australian Family	John Martin	281	1.2	+1.2
Total formal votes		23,910	95.1	−1.2
Informal votes		1,225	4.9	+1.2
Turnout		25,135	87.8	−0.3
Two-party-preferred result
Labor	Joe Szakacs	16,028	67.0	−2.0
One Nation	Melissa Higgins	7,882	33.0	+33.0
Labor hold				
