= Beverley, South Australia =

Beverley
- Suburb
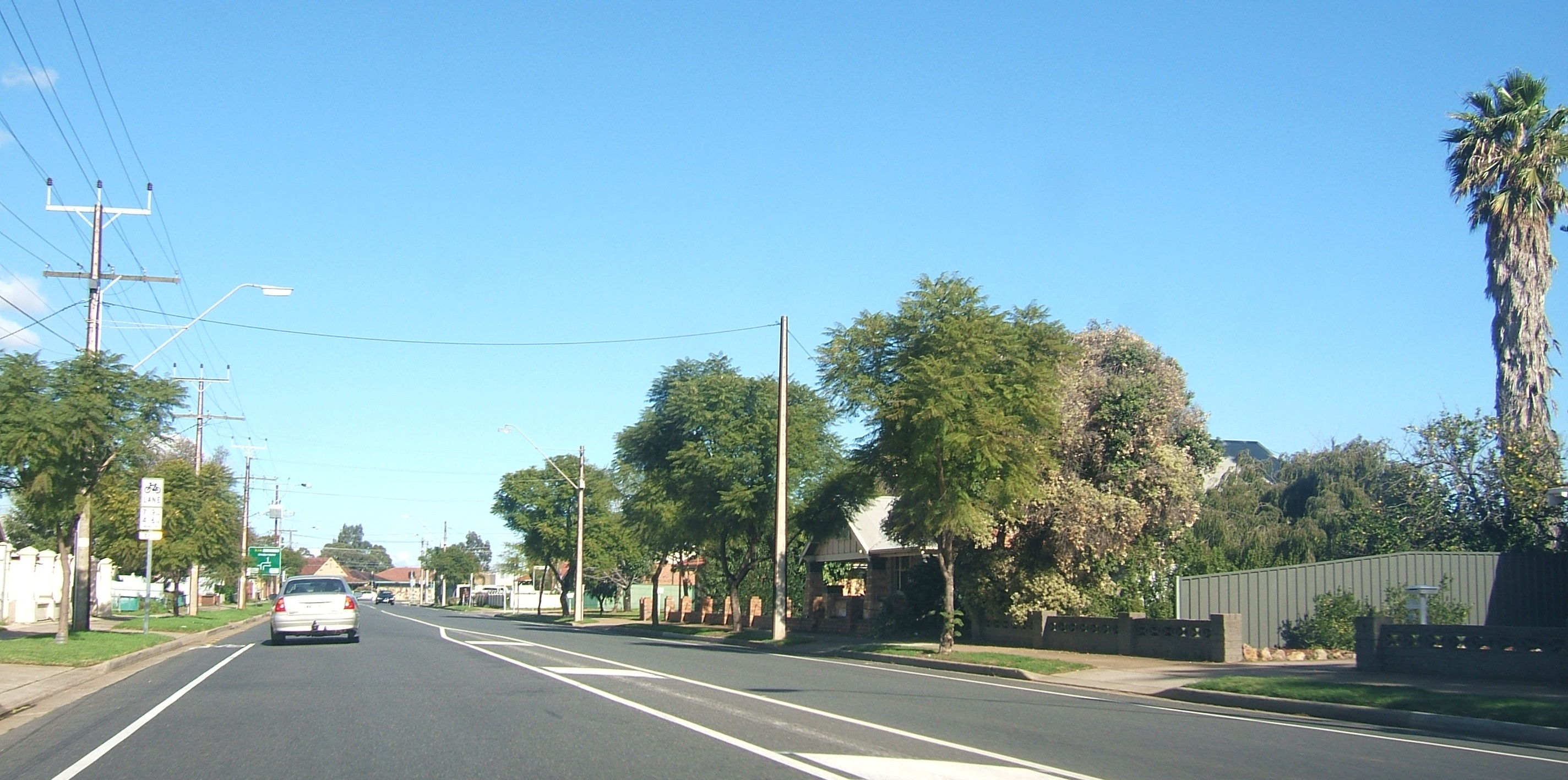
- East Avenue, Beverley

- Country: Australia
- State: South Australia
- City: Adelaide
- LGA: City of Charles Sturt
- Location: 6.1 km (3.8 mi) NW of Adelaide city centre
- Established: 1849

Government
  - State electorate: Cheltenham
  - Federal division: Hindmarsh

Population
  - Total: 1,578 (SAL 2021)
- Postcode: 5009
Suburbs around Beverley
Woodville South	Woodville Park	Kilkenny, West Croydon
Woodville South	Beverley	Allenby Gardens
Findon	Flinders Park	Flinders Park

Beverley is a western suburb of Adelaide, South Australia. It is located in the City of Charles Sturt.

== Geography ==
The suburb is mainly bounded by Port Road, East Avenue, Ledger Road and Grange Road.

== History ==
The township of Beverley now a suburb of Adelaide was laid out for Edward Stephens by his attorney, John Morphett in 1849 on section 395, Hundred of Yatala. Beverley incorporates the formerly separate suburb of York and site of the skin and fertiliser works of Crompton and Sons. Other once important manufacturing businesses of the area were Pope Products Ltd. on Princess Street, Adelaide Potteries Ltd. on Toogood Avenue and a number of independent brickworks.

The Halfway Hotel, on the Port Road, midway between Adelaide and the port, was an important landmark.

The Beverley Post Office was open from 1 January 1881 until 1901.

The GM Holden's Beverley factory is not documented in detail though according to sources, Holden’s took control of the Beverley site on 1 January 1927, although they did not actually own the building until 29 February 1928 and began operations at Beverley on Howards Road.

The Register (Adelaide, 6 August 1927) describes a labour conflict between Holden and engineers at the Beverley factory. According to the article, the Beverley facility was not engaged in motor body construction but producing automotive parts, such as ball sockets and hood frames, as well as blacksmithing for the Woodville shops.

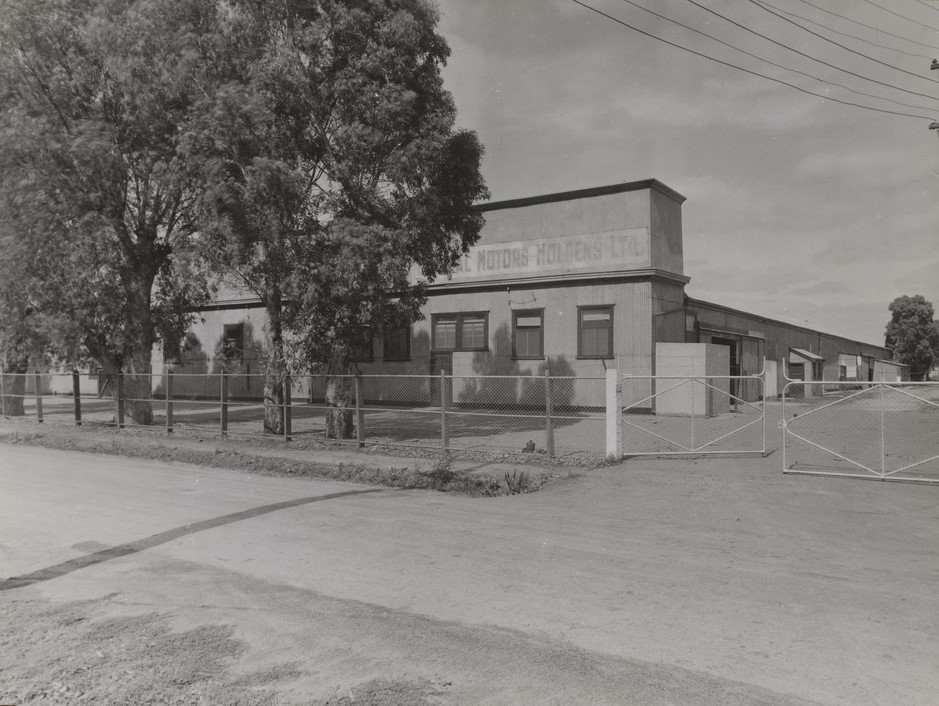
GM Holden Ltd, Beverley plant, Approximately 1939–1945.

According to Susan Marsden, when war broke out in September 1939 the Government purchased Holden's small Beverley plant and annexe to produce anti-tank and anti-aircraft guns, Equipment produced at the Beverley plant included 2-pdr. anti-tank guns and carriages, assembly of 6-pdr. anti-tank guns and carriages and assembly of Polsten 20 mm anti-aircraft guns and mountings.

Due to the significant technological advancements during World War II, one of the first weapons of high priority demanded of Australia was an anti-tank gun, the British army possessed only a limited number of the 2-pounder (bore - 40mm or 1.57 inches) anti-tank guns, which were designed just before the war, though only a few had been manufactured, recognizing this need, the Australian Army, in consultation with the Ordnance Directorate, determined a requirement for 1000 complete guns, including all necessary accessories and ancillary equipment, to be produced at a rate of 100 per month and made ready for deployment.

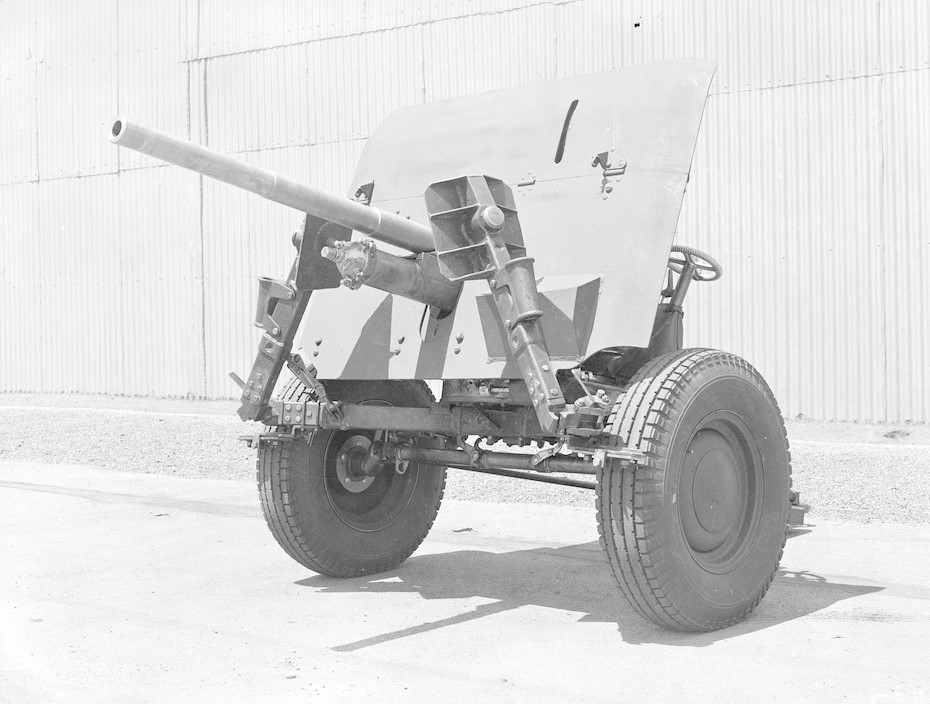
GMH Beverley plant, 2.pdr anti-tank gun, stowed.

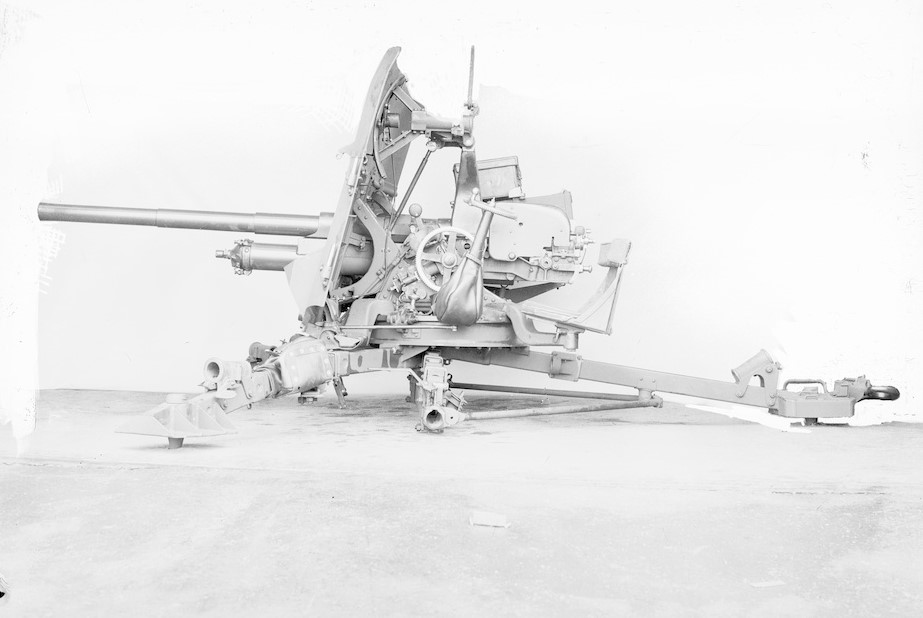
GMH Beverley plant, 2.pdr anti-tank gun, deployed.

In June 1940, a prototype 2-pounder anti-tank gun arrived in Woodville, South Australia from Melbourne by passenger train, three weeks after Dunkirk. Initial drawings had arrived earlier, with revisions and finalization ongoing, subcontractors inspected components, selecting those they could reproduce. After assembly, the guns underwent rigorous military proofing, passing all assessments, a reassuring demonstration of Australian manufacturing capability.

=== Repurposing the GMH Plant ===
In 1946 the Beverley plant was sold to Clarkson Ltd, an old city firm, which then transferred its glass treatment works to Beverley. Clarkson's owned the property until 1974, when it was sold to Arrow Properties Pty Ltd. However, Clarkson continued to lease the property for three years until they vacated it in 1977. More recent records show Harlaxton Pty Ltd as owners of the land, and ADRAD Pty Ltd as tenants.

== Demographics ==
The 2016 Census by the Australian Bureau of Statistics counted 1,498 persons in Allenby Gardens on census night. Of these, 52.7% were male and 47.3% were female.

The 2021 Census had an increased population count of 1,578 persons, with a median age of 36.

3.2% of people identified as Aboriginal and/or Torres Strait Islander. The majority of residents (66.9%) are of Australian birth, with other common census responses being India (2.6%), England (3.6%), Italy (0.6%), Vietnam (1.0%) and Philippines (1.2%). In terms of religious affiliation, 38.4% of residents attributed themselves to "No religion", 20.0% Catholic, 2.1% Eastern Orthodox, and 0.8% Sikhism.

55.9% of the population worked full-time and 5.1% were unemployed.

== Politics ==
=== Local government ===
Beverley is part of Beverley Ward in the City of Charles Sturt local government area, being represented in that council by Independent Edgar Agius and Labor member Mick Harley.

=== State and federal ===
Beverley lies in the state electoral district of Cheltenham, but prior to the 2016 redistribution was in the Croydon district. Beverley is in the federal electoral division of Hindmarsh. The suburb is represented in the South Australian House of Assembly by Joe Szakacs and federally by Mark Butler.

== Community ==
=== Schools ===
St Michael's College is a local independent Catholic high school, which services students in years 6–12. It is located on East Avenue.

== Facilities and attractions ==
=== Adelaide Arena ===
Adelaide Arena, located between William Street and Toogood Avenue, is an indoor basketball stadium and function centre with a sitting capacity of 8000. Also known as Distinctive Homes Dome and, formerly, Clipsal Powerhouse, the facility was constructed in 1991, replacing the former Apollo Stadium. It is the home of the Adelaide 36ers and the Adelaide Lightning.

=== Parks ===
The only park within Beverley is the Toogood Reserve.

== Transportation ==
=== Roads ===
Beverley is serviced by Port Road, connecting the suburb to Port Adelaide and Adelaide city centre, and Grange Road, which forms part of its southern boundary. East Avenue, on Beverley's eastern boundary, links Port and Grange roads.

=== Public transport ===
Beverley is serviced by public transport run by the Adelaide Metro.

== See also ==
- List of Adelaide suburbs
