= Queenstown, South Australia =

Queenstown
- Suburb
- Interactive map of Queenstown
- Coordinates: 34°51′44″S 138°30′32″E
- Country: Australia
- State: South Australia
- Region: Western Adelaide
- City: Adelaide
- LGA: City of Port Adelaide Enfield
- Location: 10 km (6.2 mi) from CBD

Government
  - State electorate: Cheltenham
  - Federal division: Hindmarsh

Population
  - Total: 1,943 (SAL 2021)
- Postcode: 5014
- County: Adelaide
Suburbs around Queenstown
| Port Adelaide | Port Adelaide; Alberton | Alberton |
| West Lakes; Royal Park | Queenstown | Alberton; Cheltenham |
| Royal Park; Hendon | Hendon | Albert Park; Cheltenham |

Queenstown is a north-western suburb of Adelaide about 10.5 km from the CBD, in the state of South Australia, Australia and the city council area of Port Adelaide Enfield.

Queenstown occupies a triangular-shaped area of land which is bounded by the Port Road to the north-east, Old Port Road to the south-west and by Webb Street to the north-west.

== History ==
The first Queenstown Post Office opened around 1865 and closed around 1869. An Alberton West office was renamed Queenstown East in 1948, then Queenstown in 1966 before closing in 1976.

The District Council of Queenstown and Alberton was established in 1864, bringing dedicated local government to the residents of the two townships either side of the new Port Road. In 1898 this council was absorbed by the Corporate Town of Port Adelaide.

The former Whittaker Memorial Primitive Methodist Church, later the Queenstown Church of Christ, at 193-195 Port Road, is listed on the South Australian Heritage Register.
