= Royal Park, South Australia =

Royal Park
- Suburb
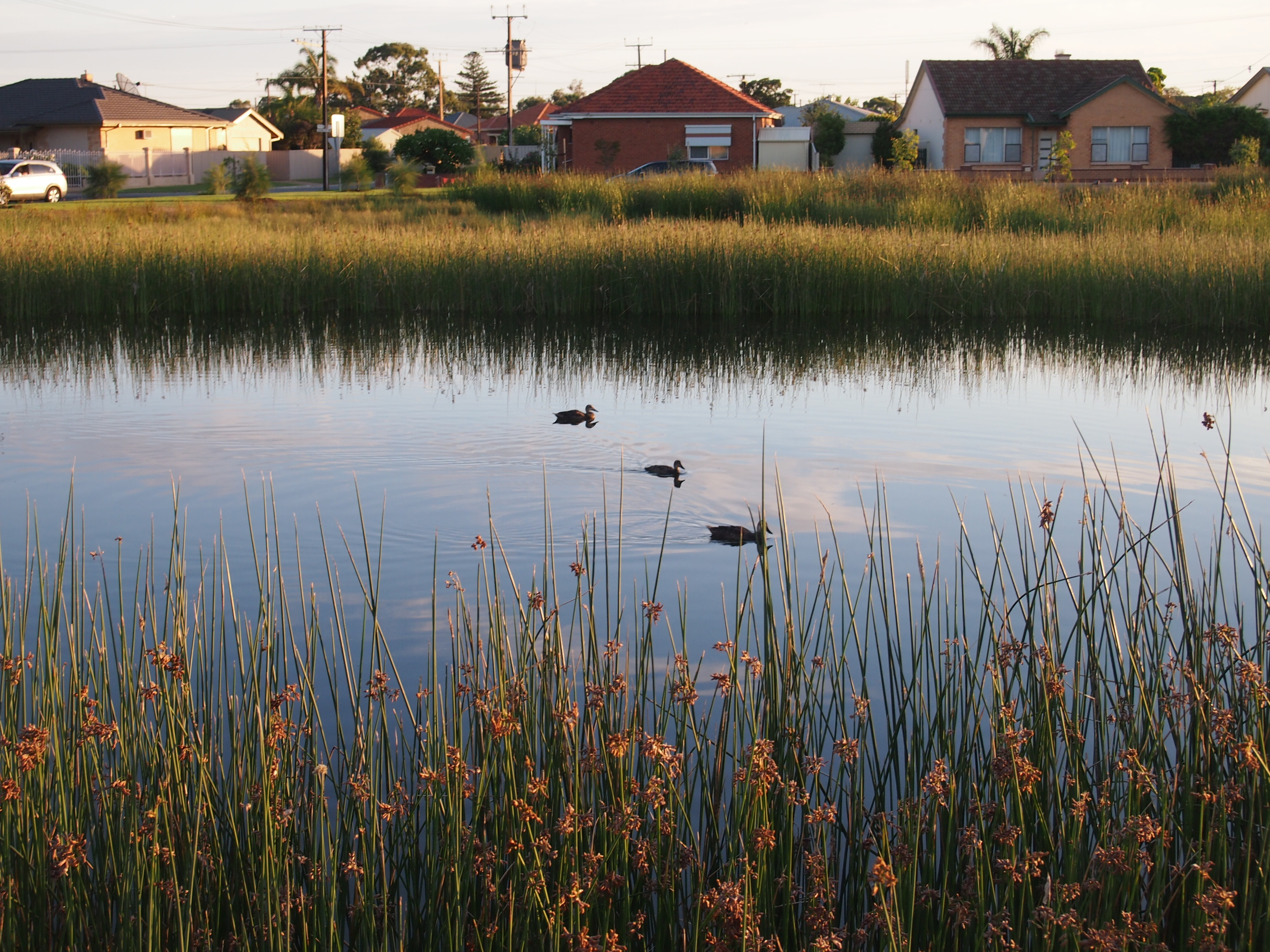
- Wetland at Cooke Reserve for treating urban stormwater runoff for an ASR scheme in western Adelaide

- Coordinates: 34.872°S 138.508°E
- Country: Australia
- State: South Australia
- City: Adelaide
- LGA: City of Charles Sturt
- Location: 12 km (7.5 mi) NW of Adelaide city centre; 3 km (1.9 mi) south of Port Adelaide
- Established: 1880s

Government
  - State electorate: Lee
  - Federal division: Hindmarsh

Population
  - Total: 3,453 (SAL 2021)
- Postcode: 5014
Suburbs around Royal Park
West Lakes	Queenstown	Queenstown
West Lakes	Royal Park	Hendon
West Lakes	Seaton	Seaton

Royal Park is located in the western suburbs of Adelaide. It is home to a large Polish community, as evidenced by the establishment of St Stanislaus of Cracow Catholic Church. Other ethnic groups represented include Italian, Croatian, Bosnian, Irish, Macedonian and Greek. At that time there was still Aboriginal people, the Kaurna, living around the wetlands west of Royal Park that is now the suburb of West Lakes. In the 1950s a few streets at the southern end of Royal Park were allocated for Government Public Housing developments through the South Australian Housing Trust. In recent years, there has been large-scale re-developments that include private housing and a soon-to-be-built retirement village.

== Community ==
=== Parks and reserves ===
- Carnegie North Reserve
- Cooke Reserve
- Fisher Reserve
- Royal Reserve

=== Schools ===
- Hendon Primary School
- Royal Park High School - opened 1971; name changed to West Lakes High School, 1978; closed 1991.

=== Businesses ===
- Clean Seas is headquartered here.
