= Seaton, South Australia =

Seaton
- Suburb
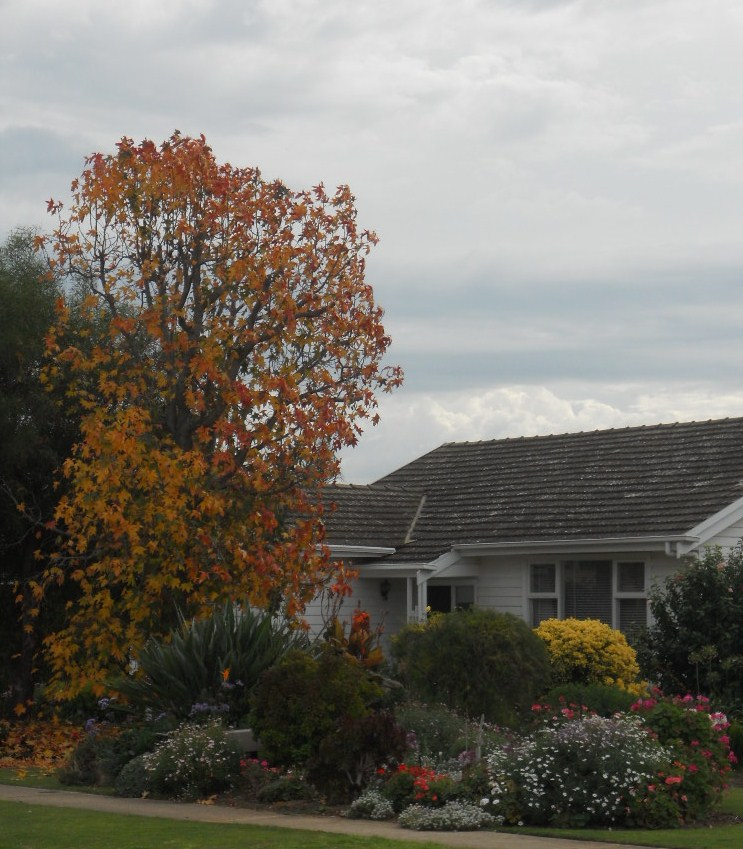
- A post-war home in Seaton

- Interactive map of Seaton
- Country: Australia
- State: South Australia
- City: Adelaide
- LGA: City of Charles Sturt
- Location: 9 km (5.6 mi) from Adelaide

Government
  - State electorate: Lee
  - Federal division: Hindmarsh

Population
  - Total: 10,877 (SAL 2021)
- Postcode: 5023
Suburbs around Seaton
West Lakes	Royal Park; Hendon; Albert Park	Albert Park; Woodville West
West Lakes; Grange	Seaton	Woodville West; Findon
Fulham Gardens	Fulham Gardens; Kidman Park	Kidman Park

Seaton is a suburb of Adelaide, South Australia, located in the western suburbs near Findon, Grange and West Lakes. Seaton is home to the Royal Adelaide Golf Club. Main roads including Tapleys Hill Road and Grange Road go through the suburb.

== History ==
Prior to World War II the area was largely rural, with market gardens, poultry farms and lucerne paddocks, bounded to the west by sand dunes. With the rapid development of industry during and after the war years, including the munitions factory at Hendon and the General Motors-Holden motor vehicle assembly plant at Woodville, the South Australian Housing Trust developed large areas of low-cost workers' housing in Seaton and other nearby suburbs.

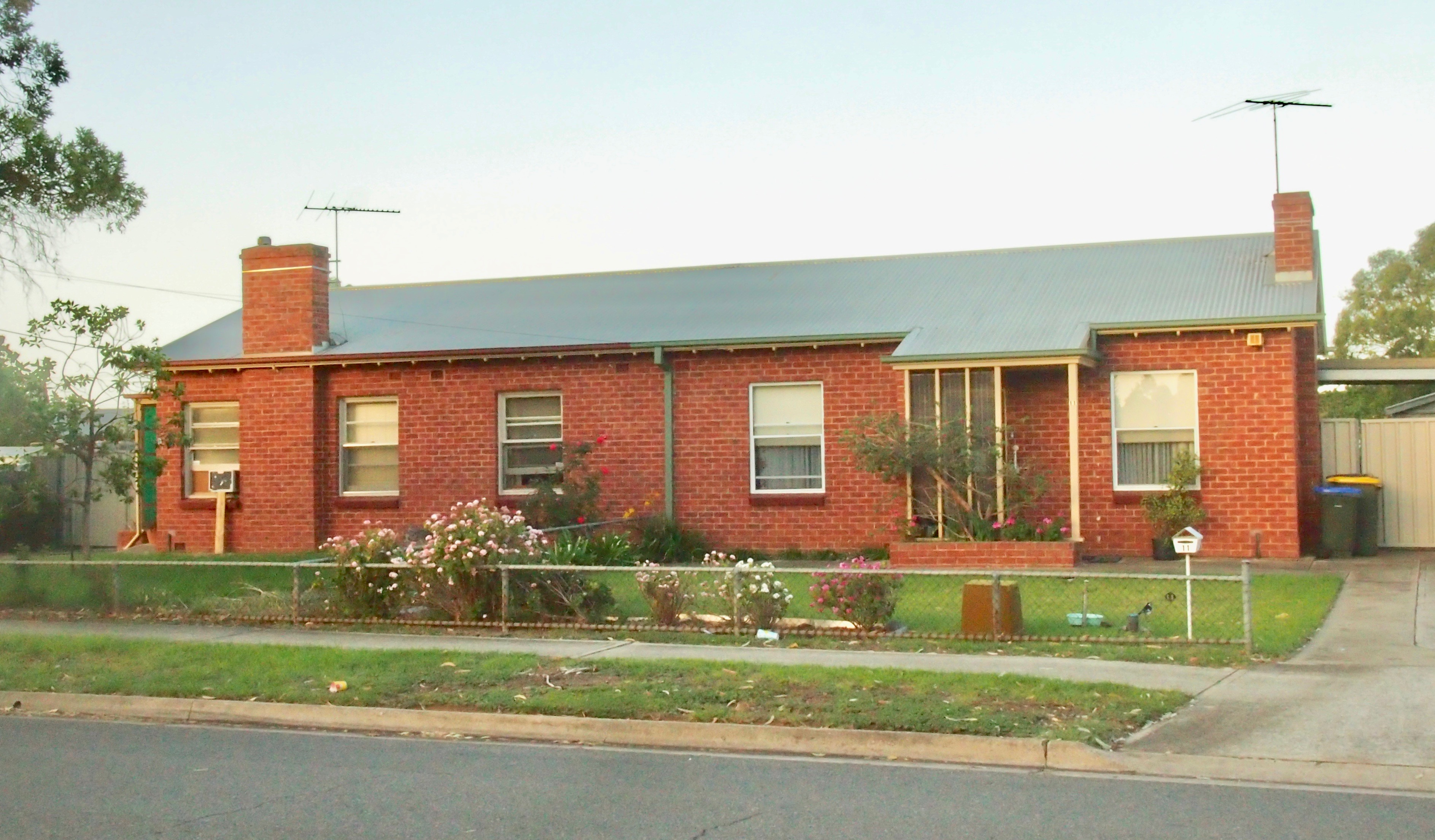
South Australian Housing Trust late 1940s semi-detached cottages, showing little exterior modification of the original design.

The first Seaton Post Office opened on 1 September 1965, renamed from Seaton Park; in 1991 it closed and was replaced by the second office renamed from Seaton North.

== Facilities ==
There are currently two schools located within Seaton, both of which are Government and co-educational:

- Seaton Park Primary School, located on Balcombe Avenue.
- Seaton High School, located on the corner of Frederick Road and Glenburnie Street.

The Catholic church in the suburb is dedicated to Mater Christi.

== Sport ==
Seaton is known for its football team, the Seaton Ramblers, who play in Division Three in SAAFL.

Seaton is known for its NRLSA rugby league club, the Western Districts Warriors Rugby League Club, who play in the NRLSA Premier Men's competition. The Western Districts Warriors were established in 2016 and have won NRLSA Premierships in 2020, 2021, 2022, 2023 and 2025. The Western District Warriors operate out of Gleneagles Reserve.
