= Woodville, South Australia =

Woodville
- Suburb
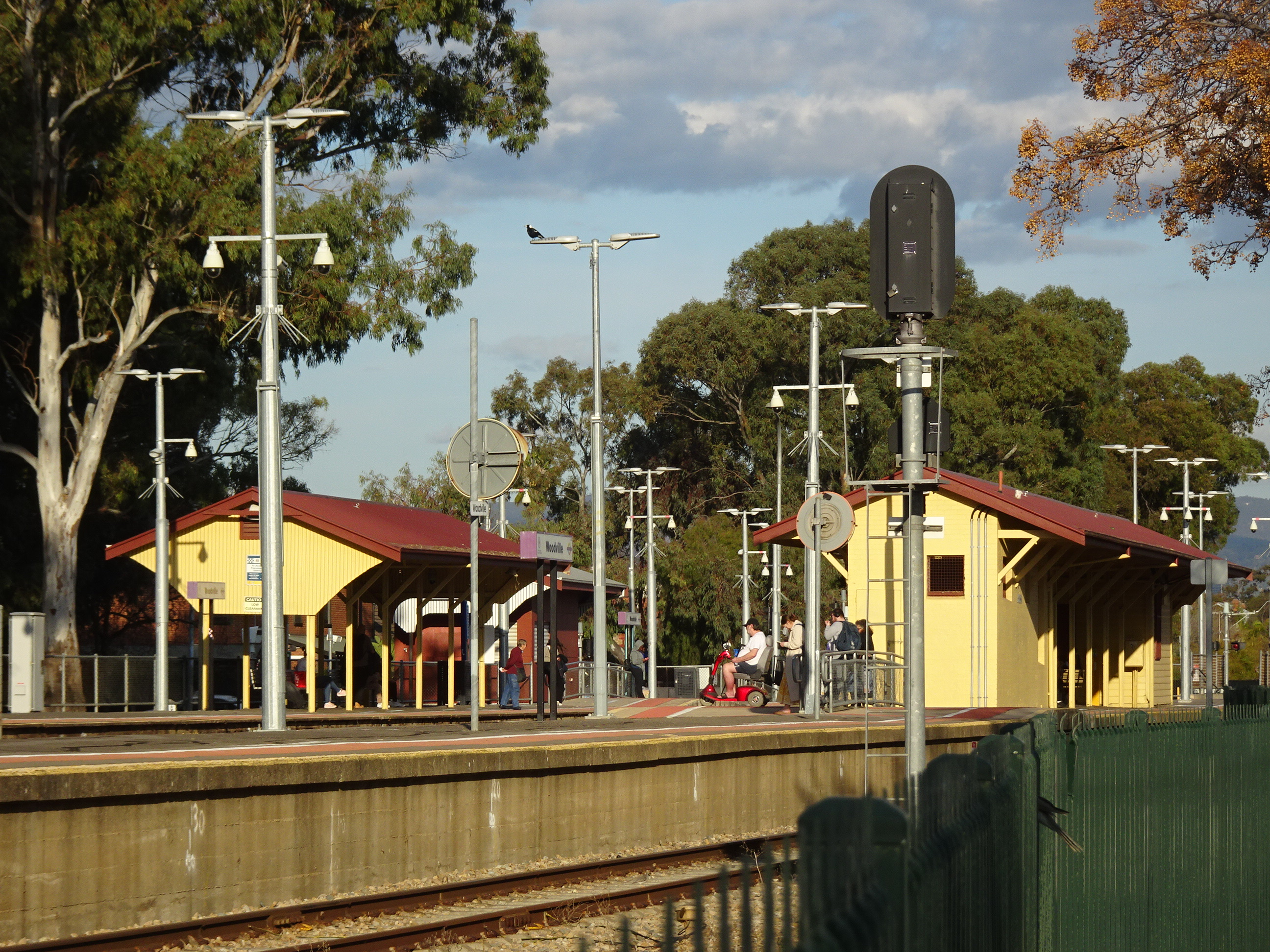
- Woodville railway station

- Interactive map of Woodville
- Country: Australia
- State: South Australia
- City: Adelaide
- LGA: City of Charles Sturt

Government
  - State electorate: Cheltenham
  - Federal division: Hindmarsh

Population
  - Total: 2,180 (SAL 2021)
- Postcode: 5011
Suburbs around Woodville
Cheltenham	St Clair, Woodville North	Woodville Gardens, Kilkenny
Albert Park	Woodville	Woodville Park
Woodville West	Woodville South	Beverley

Woodville is a suburb of Adelaide. It is situated about 8 km (5 mi) north-west of the Adelaide city centre. It lies within the City of Charles Sturt. The postcode of Woodville is 5011. Woodville is bound by Cheltenham Parade to the west, Torrens Road to the north, Port Road to the south and Park Street to the east, excluding the area of the former Cheltenham Park Racecourse, now the suburb of St Clair. The population was 2,180 at the 2021 Australian census.

The Church of St Margaret of Scotland, on the corner of Port and Woodville Roads, is a state heritage-listed building, and there are many other buildings of historical and architectural significance.

== History ==
=== 19th century ===
Before the colonisation of South Australia in 1836, the indigenous Kaurna people lived on the land now called Woodville.

The Woodville area is believed to have been settled by Europeans because it was more or less halfway between the Adelaide city centre and Port Adelaide. According to historian Geoff Manning, the name was descriptive of its then environment, with many trees in the vicinity. However, he also noted that there was a Woodville village in Derbyshire, England.

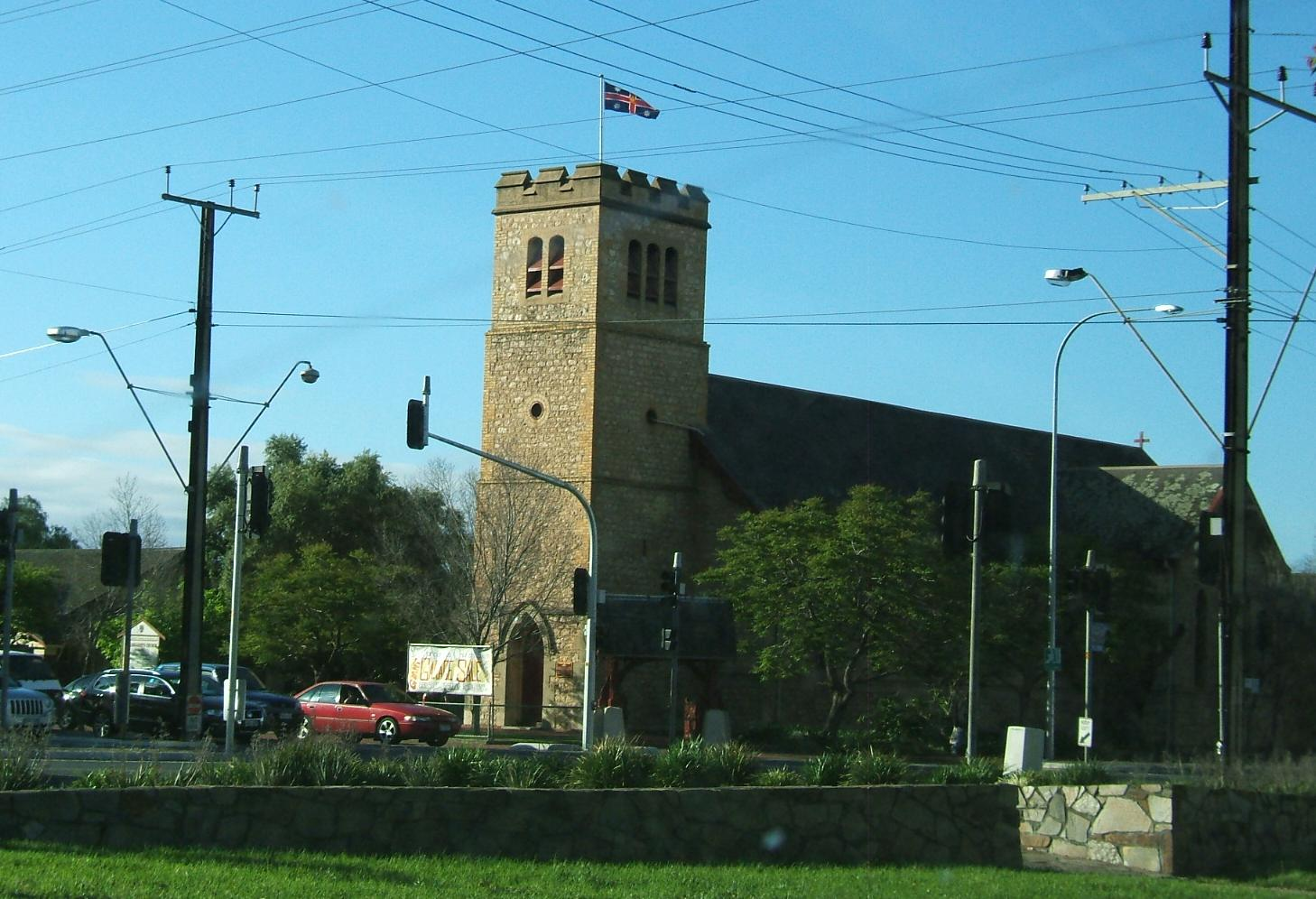
St Margaret's Anglican Church, Woodville Road.

The first building recorded was an inn called "Halfway House", which opened in 1839, near the site of the later Woodville Hotel. In 1878, a spring was discovered alongside the inn. The town was laid out in 1849. The commercial centre was along Port Road, with Woodville Road then called Main Street. Woodville was a part of the District Council of Hindmarsh until 1975.

By 1853, Woodville consisted of 24 houses, a forge and a wheelwright's shop. The Woodville Post Office opened around March 1856, but was definitely established by 1858.

In 1854, John Bristow Hughes (of Bundaleer Station) bought a residence called St Clair. Under his ownership, it became one of the largest mansions in Adelaide at that time. Hughes added an underground kitchen, a second storey, and the entire ground floor was converted into a ballroom. The home was demolished and replaced by the St Clair Recreation Centre in 1962, which is itself locally heritage listed on account of its modernist architecture and being South Australia's first major youth centre and indoor sports stadium.

Hughes also built the Church of St Margaret of Scotland in 1855. He chose the name in memory of his late wife Margaret, but Augustus Short, Anglican Bishop of Adelaide, would not allow him to name it after her. After some delay, the men reached a compromise and, in February 1856, the church was consecrated in honour of both Margaret Hughes and the patron saint, St Margaret of Scotland.

Woodville railway station opened in 1856, and Woodville Primary School and the Institute opened in 1878.

=== 20th century ===
Woodville High School opened in 1915.

In 1923, Holden Motor Body Builders established a 23.5-acre (9.5 ha) site known as the Holden Woodville Plant (although it was in fact in the nearby suburb of Cheltenham), expanding to 40 acres (16 ha) and employing 5,500 people three years later, which had an impact on all of the surrounding suburbs.

In 1927, the Woodville Town Hall was constructed by the council in association with cinema entrepreneur Dan Clifford, to be used as a picture theatre called the Star Theatre (or Woodville Star). The cinema, which had two levels of seating, opened with the American silent comedy We're in the Navy Now on 12 April 1927, and continued to be operated by Clifford Theatres/Star Theatres chain until 1947, when Greater Union took over. The Star Theatre was closed on 9 November 1974, but continued to show Greek films for some time afterwards. The building was later heritage-listed, and underwent a major renovation in 2010.

During World War II, a railway spur was built from Woodville station to Finsbury ammunition factory in 1940, and the railway station itself was rebuilt. In 1942 the Actil factory was built to manufacture cotton materials, and after the war, many new migrants staying at the nearby migrant hostel were employed at the factory.

The area was considered to be a genteel area. Many European migrants settled in Woodville and the surrounds after World War II. It was a busy local centre in the 1950s and 1960s because of the Holden plant at Cheltenham, and because of its proximity to the Queen Elizabeth Hospital in Woodville South (opened in 1958 by the Queen Mother). Woodville Road was the hub of local activity, with numerous commercial businesses.

During the 1980s and 1990s, Woodville and its surrounds became home to many Vietnamese refugees from the Vietnam War. Through the 1980s, Holden progressively moved its operations to its Elizabeth plant, leading to the closure of Holden Woodville Plant.

In 1996, a new civic centre and library was built next to the old town hall. The City of Hindmarsh Woodville and the City of Henley and Grange amalgamated to form the City of Charles Sturt from 1 January 1997.

== Location and governance ==
The suburbs adjacent to Woodville are Woodville Gardens, Woodville Park, and Woodville West.

It falls under the local government area of the City of Charles Sturt.

== Facilities ==
The local zone high school is Woodville High School (opened 1915).

St Clair Recreation Centre, located at 109 Woodville Road, was extensively refurbished and expanded in 2018.

The Church of St Margaret of Scotland, situated on the corner of Port Road and Woodville Road, is an Anglican church, and the building is heritage-listed building. The Ukrainian Catholic Church, Saints Volodymyr and Olha Church, built in 1963, is located on Woodville Road. The Woodville Christadelphian Hall is located on Aberfeldy Avenue.

== Demographics ==
In the 2016 Census, there were 1,999 people in Woodville, of which 49.2% were male and 50.8% were female. The median age was 39, compared to a median of 40 for the State of South Australia. 3.2% of the population was over 85%, compared to 2.7% for South Australia and 2.1% for Australia. 23.2% of residents had completed study at a university or tertiary institution, compared to a State average of 16.2.

In 2016 the most common ancestries were English 19.1%, Australian 17.7%, Italian 11.3%, Irish 5.5% and Scottish 5.3%. 1.1% identified as Aboriginal and/or Torres Strait Islander. 66.0% of people were born in Australia, compared to a State average of 71.1, demonstrating the relatively high cultural diversity within the suburb. The most common countries of birth were India 5.3%, Italy 3.5%, Vietnam 3.4%, England 2.5% and China (excludes SARs and Taiwan) 1.4%. 62.7% of residents only spoke English at home. Of other languages spoken at home, the most frequent were Italian at 5.4% and Vietnamese at 5.3%, which were well above the State averages of 1.7 and 1.1 for these languages.

The median weekly personal income for people aged 15 years and over in 2016 was $628, and $1,549 for a family, slightly above the State median weekly incomes of $600 and $1,510 respectively.

The most common responses for religion in the 2016 census were No Religion 27.3%, Catholic 26.8%, Not stated 8.4%, Anglican 6.1% and Eastern Orthodox 5.7%. Christianity was the largest religious group reported overall (53.4%).

== Sports teams ==
Woodville was previously the home of the semi-professional Australian rules football team Woodville Football Club, which competed in the South Australian National Football League (SANFL). Woodville merged with the West Torrens Football Club to form the Woodville-West Torrens Eagles in 1991.

In 2005, the Woodville Warriors won the Australian Basketball League championship, which is South Australia's state league. This was their first championship since 2000.

== Heritage ==
The suburb has many fine examples of colonial and federation architecture.

Woodville has one building listed on the South Australian Heritage Register: St Margaret's Anglican Church (officially the Church of St Margaret of Scotland), located at 789-791 Port Road, was dedicated in 1856 and is constructed of picked limestone. The structure is dominated by a rectangular tower and the church contains stained glass windows which honour local pioneers. A lych-gate, which is also heritage listed, was built in 1919 as a memorial to Woodville men who served in World War I. The church is significant as one of several 'village' churches built within the Adelaide districts between 1836 and 1860, as well as its representation of the development of the early Anglican Church within South Australia. (The Brocas Museum, at 111 Woodville Road, was listed when it lay in the bounds of Woodville; however, it is now within the suburb of St Clair, a new suburb created in 2012.)

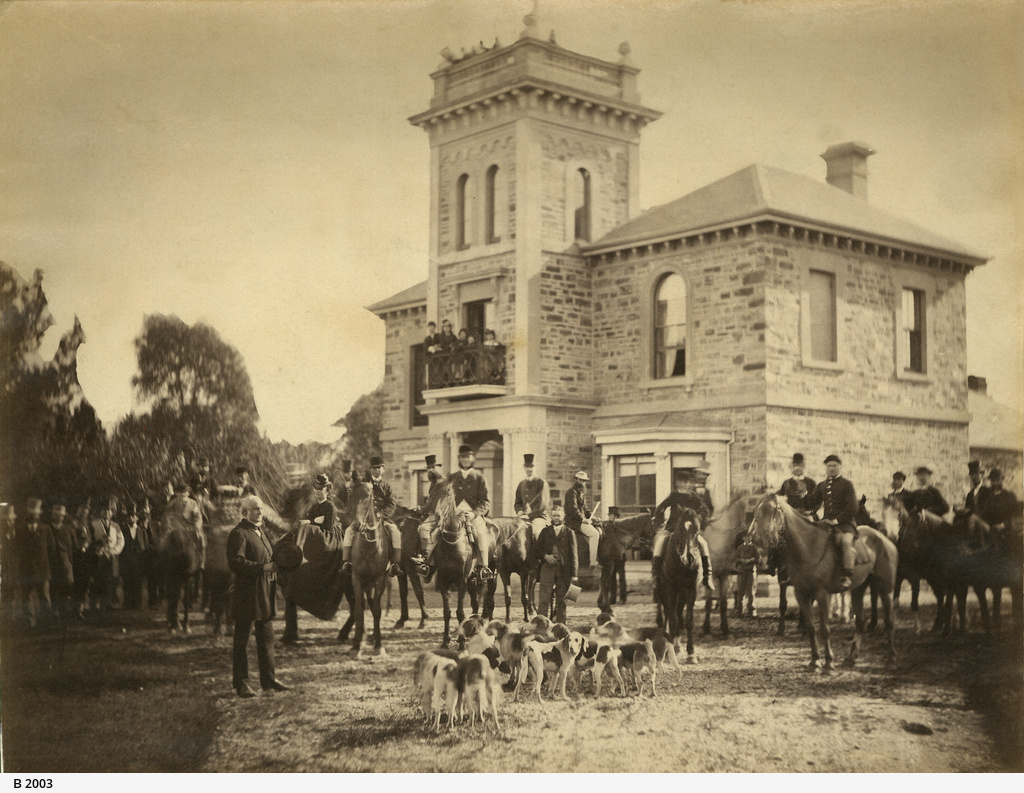
Adelaide Hunt Club at 'The Brocas', Woodville.

St Clair Recreation Centre (built 1962) is local heritage-listed on account of being South Australia's first major youth centre and indoor sports stadium and its modernist architecture. It was fully refurbished and expanded in 2018.

Significant parts of Woodville have been declared a Historic Conservation Zone, which includes the adjacent suburb of Woodville Park. The zone contains a number of buildings of local heritage significance, including the Mareeba Hospital and former Nurses Home at 19-21 Belmore Terrace; the former Woodville Private Hospital building at 2 Jelley Street, currently a nursing home; former Council chambers at 765 Port Road, the Woodville Town Hall and Council chambers; the original school building and gates of Woodville High School; and several private residences and former residences on Woodville Road, Torrens Road, Stanley Street and Belmore Terrace. A number of homes within Woodville are listed as contributory items to the Historic Conservation Zone within the City of Charles Sturt's Development Plan.
