= Woodville Park, South Australia =

Woodville Park
- Suburb
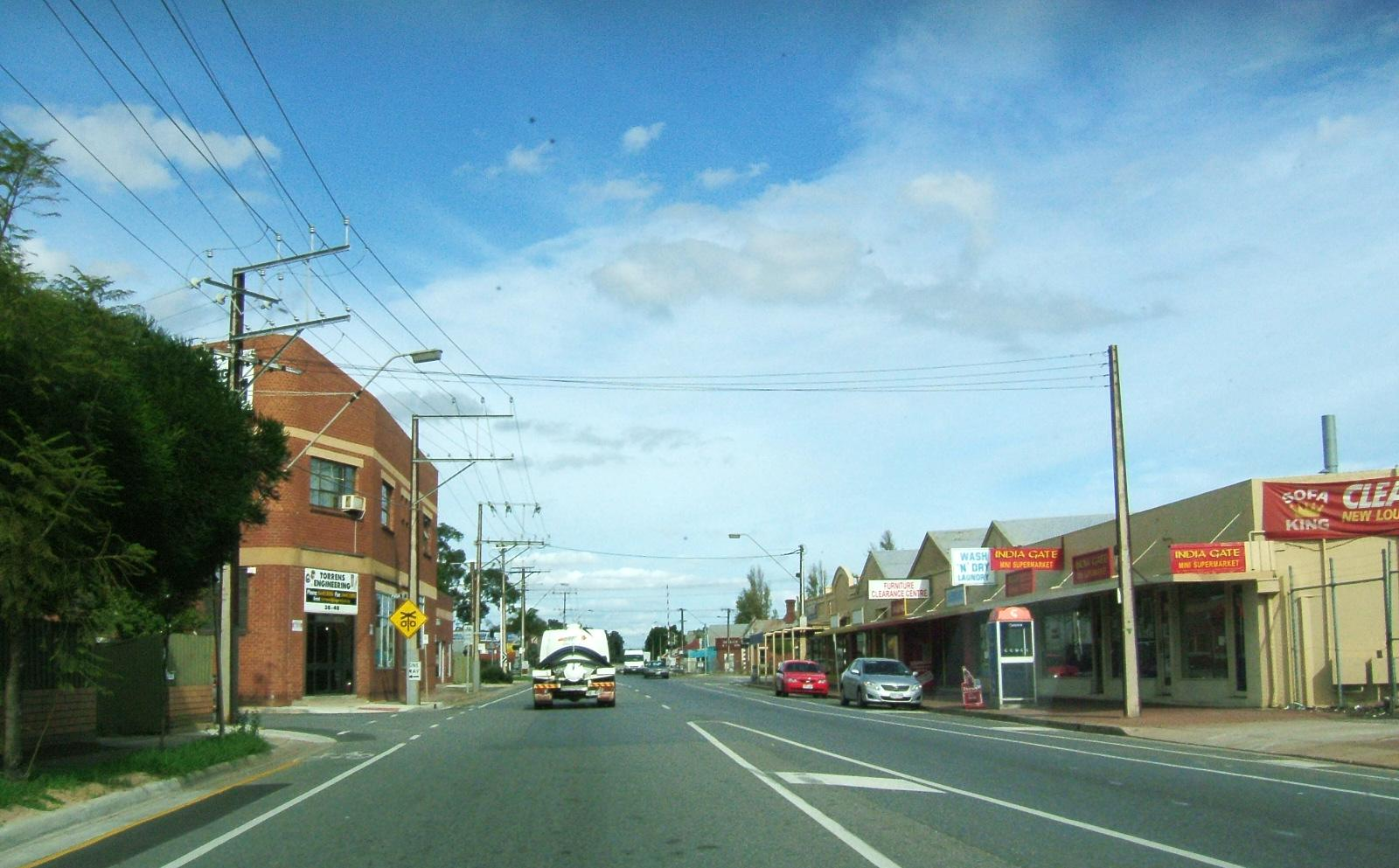
- Looking south on David Terrace. Woodville Park is on the right.

- Interactive map of Woodville Park
- Country: Australia
- State: South Australia
- City: Adelaide
- LGA: City of Charles Sturt
- Location: 8 km (5.0 mi) from Adelaide

Government
  - State electorate: Cheltenham
  - Federal division: Hindmarsh

Population
  - Total: 1,852 (SAL 2021)
- Postcode: 5011
Suburbs around Woodville Park
Woodville	Woodville North, Woodville Gardens	Woodville Gardens, Kilkenny
Woodville South	Woodville Park	Kilkenny, West Croydon
Woodville South	Beverley	Allenby Gardens, West Croydon

Woodville Park is a suburb in the northwestern suburbs of Adelaide, South Australia, around 8 km from the city centre. Woodville Park is bordered to the north by Torrens Road, to the east by Kilkenny Road and David Terrace, to the south by Port Road and to the west by Park Street. It is crossed by the Outer Harbor railway line (southeast to northwest) and is served by the Woodville Park railway station at the northwest end and by Kilkenny railway station on the other side of David Terrace.
