= City of Charles Sturt =

Coordinates: 34°53′S 138°31′E

- Local government area
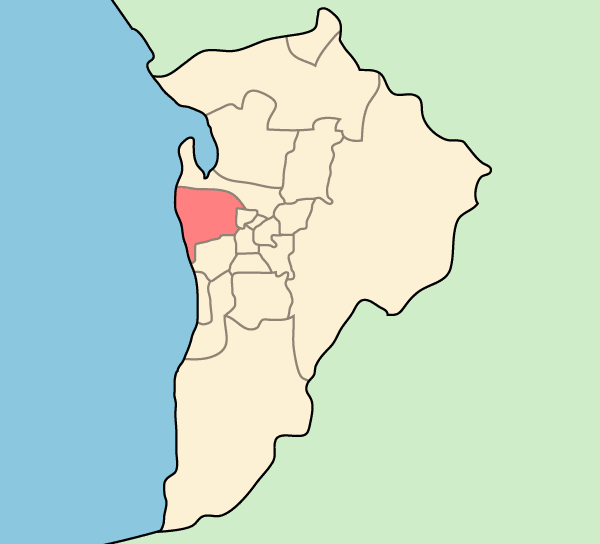

- Interactive map of City of Charles Sturt
- Country: Australia
- State: South Australia
- Region: Western Adelaide
- Established: 1 January 1997
- Council seat: Woodville

Government
  - Mayor: Angela Evans
  - State electorate: Adelaide, Cheltenham, Colton, Croydon, Enfield, Lee, West Torrens
  - Federal division: Adelaide, Hindmarsh, Port Adelaide

Area
  - Total: 52.14 km^{2} (20.13 sq mi)

Population
  - Total: 121,840 (2021 census)
  - Density: 2,336.8/km^{2} (6,052/sq mi)
- Website: City of Charles Sturt
LGAs around City of Charles Sturt
City of Port Adelaide Enfield	City of Prospect
City of Charles Sturt	City of Adelaide
City of West Torrens	City of West Torrens

The City of Charles Sturt is a local government area in the western suburbs of Adelaide, South Australia, stretching to the coast.

The council was formed on 1 January 1997 as a result of the amalgamation of the City of Hindmarsh Woodville and the City of Henley and Grange. It comprises a mix of residential, industrial and commercial areas and had a population of 121,840 in 2021.

== History ==
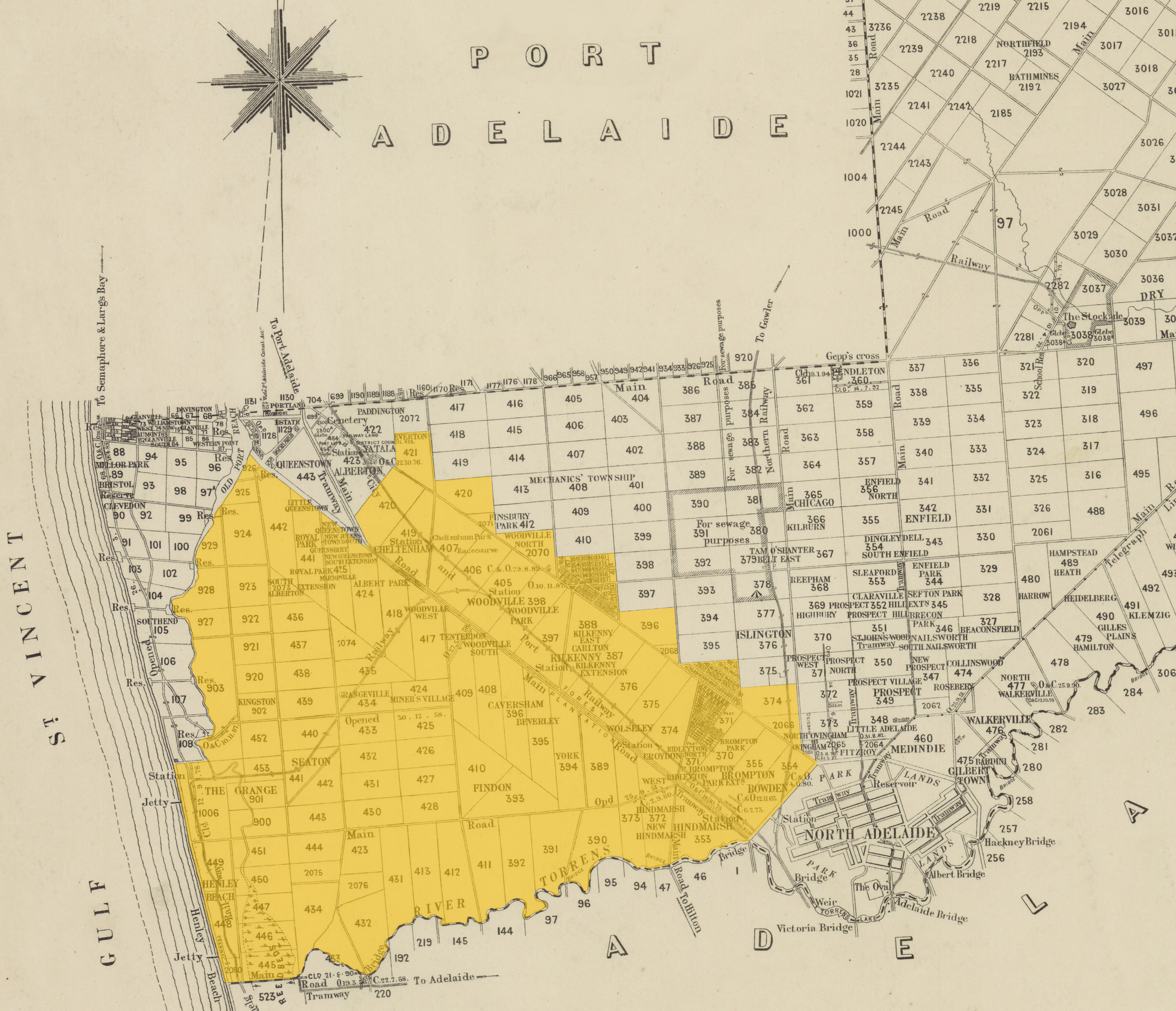
Map showing the boundaries of the District Council of Hindmarsh in relation to the Hundred of Yatala in 1853. The area is very similar to the boundaries of the present-day City of Charles Sturt, with the exception of the north-west coastal strip that was once the District Council of Glanville.

The first local government to be established in the area was the District Council of Hindmarsh (established in 1853), covering the north west suburbs of Adelaide south of the port and north of the Torrens. The boundaries of the Hindmarsh district council were remarkably similar to the boundaries of the City of Charles Sturt, but the intervening years from 1874 to 1997 saw several divisions and amalgamations in the original council area, leading to the current boundaries.

In 1874 the Town of Hindmarsh seceded from the original district council, the latter changing its name to District Council of Woodville a year later. The Town of Hindmarsh included the near-city communities of Hindmarsh, Bowden, Brompton, Croydon and what would become Renown Park. The District Council of Woodville ultimately came to be seated at the present-day civic centre on Woodville Road at Woodville.

As part of the District Councils Act 1887 consolidation of local government in the state, the rump of the District Council of Glanville was amalgamated into Woodville council as the Davenport ward in 1888. This closely following the creation of the Town of Semaphore which removed a significantly-populated portion of Glanville. This now meant that the Woodville council's western boundary was the coastline from the Torrens to Fort Glanville.

In December 1915, the seaside communities of Henley Beach and Grange seceded from Woodville council (along with the West Beach area of West Torrens council) to form the Municipality of Henley and Grange

The Woodville and Hindmarsh councils were reunited in 1993 as the City of Hindmarsh Woodville, and, four years later, the City of Henley and Grange was also reunited to form the present boundaries as the City of Charles Sturt.

== Councillors ==
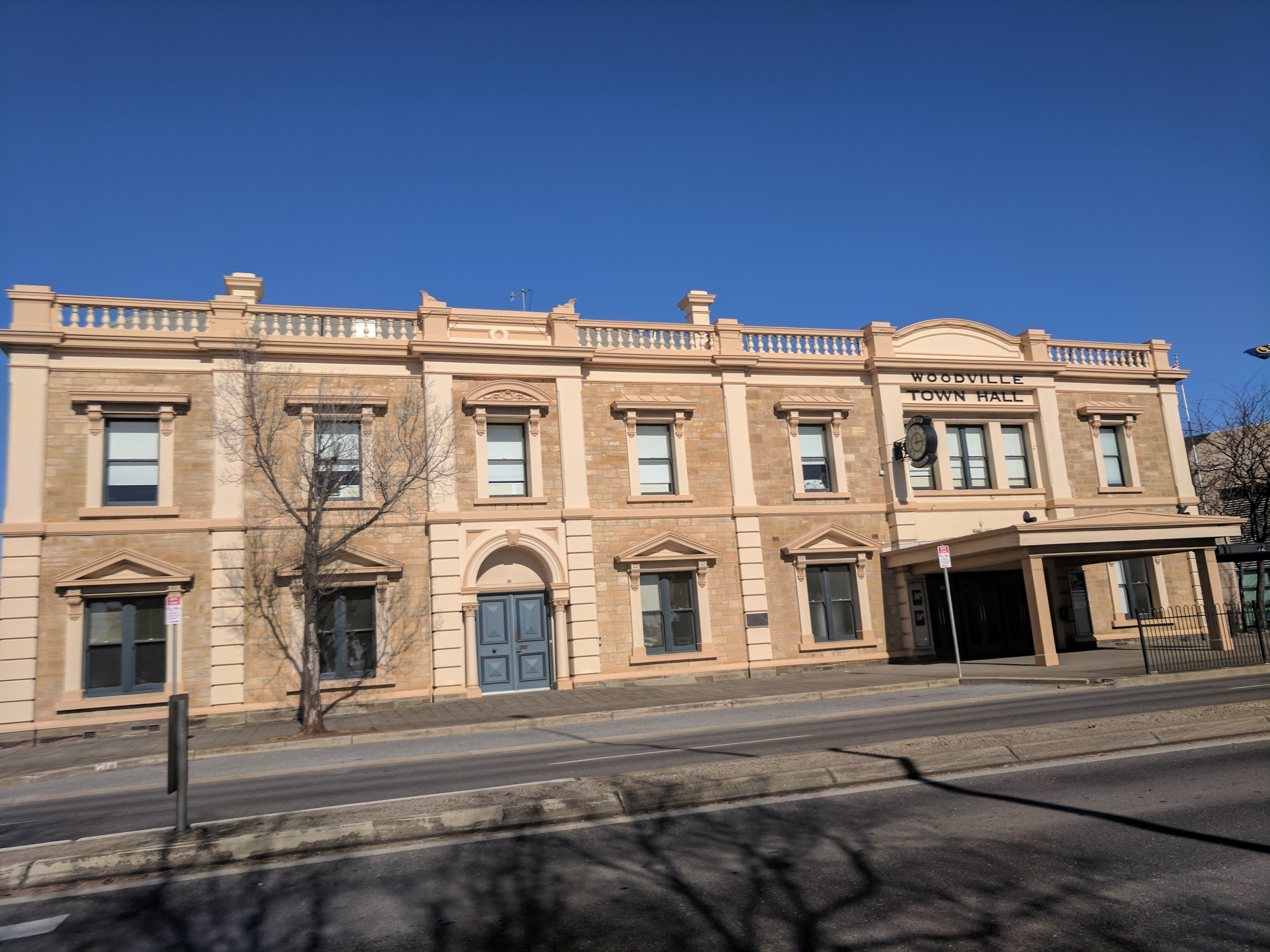
Woodville Town Hall at Charles Sturt civic centre in 2017

The current council as of December 2022 is:

Ward	Party	Councillor	Notes
Mayor	Independent	Angela Evans	
Beverley	Labor	Edgar Agius	
Beverley	Independent	Michael McEwen	
Findon	Labor	Peter Ppiros	
Findon	Independent	George Turelli	
Grange	Independent	Rachele Tullio	
Grange	Independent	Tom Scheffler	
Henley	Independent	Kenzie Van den Nieuwelaar	
Henley	Liberal	Merlindie Fardone	
Hindmarsh	Independent	Katriona Kinsella	
Hindmarsh	Labor	Alice Campbell	
Semaphore Park	Independent	Stuart Ghent	
Semaphore Park	Independent	Nicholas Le Lacheur	
Woodville	Independent	Quin Tran	
Woodville	Labor	Senthil Chidambaranathan	
West Woodville	Independent	Kelly Thomas	
West Woodville	Independent	Nicole Mazeika	

== Suburbs ==
- Albert Park
- Allenby Gardens
- Athol Park
- Beverley
- Bowden
- Brompton
- Cheltenham
- Croydon
- Devon Park
- Findon
- Flinders Park
- Fulham Gardens
- Grange
- Hendon
- Henley Beach
- Henley Beach South
- Hindmarsh
- Kidman Park
- Kilkenny
- Ovingham
- Pennington
- Renown Park
- Ridleyton
- Rosewater
- Royal Park
- Seaton
- Semaphore Park
- St Clair
- Tennyson
- Welland
- West Beach
- West Croydon
- West Hindmarsh
- West Lakes
- West Lakes Shore
- Woodville
- Woodville North
- Woodville Park
- Woodville South
- Woodville West

== See also ==
- List of Adelaide parks and gardens
