= Albert Park, South Australia =

Albert Park
- Suburb
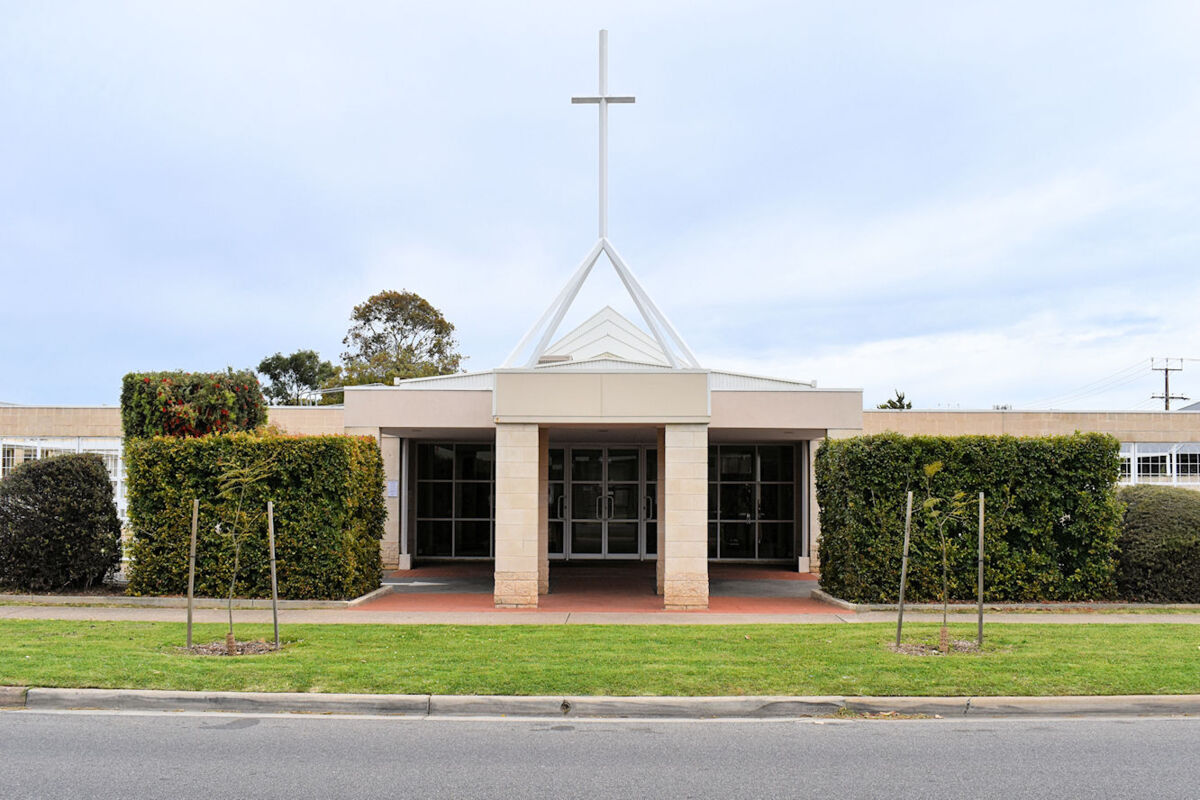
- Our Lady Queen Of Peace, Albert Park

- Interactive map of Albert Park
- Country: Australia
- State: South Australia
- City: Adelaide
- LGA: City of Charles Sturt
- Location: 8.9 km (5.5 mi) NW of Adelaide city centre
- Established: 1877

Government
  - State electorate: Cheltenham (2011)
  - Federal division: Hindmarsh

Population
  - Total: 1,780 (SAL 2021)
- Postcode: 5014
Suburbs around Albert Park
Hendon	Queenstown	Cheltenham
Hendon	Albert Park	Woodville
Seaton	Woodville West	Woodville West

Albert Park is a suburb of Adelaide, South Australia. It is located in the City of Charles Sturt.

== History ==
Named for Prince Albert, Albert Park was laid out in 1877 by a W.R. Cave. The suburb was advertised as:

Where the soil is suitable for flower and market gardens, being rich alluvial soil, and lucerne now growing there most luxuriantly and water can be obtained at six feet... Carters... will find it excellently situated as a stopping place for their teams and also for loading at night, being favourably placed in respect both to Adelaide and Port Adelaide.

— The Manning Index of South Australian History

In 1920 a parcel of 60 acres (24 ha) of land in Albert Park was bought by the aviator Harry Butler, who set it up the Hendon Aerodrome. Part of this site was subdivided in 1921 for residential development, and together with the aerodrome this land became the new suburb of Hendon. The aerodrome was compulsorily acquired by the Commonwealth in 1922 and operated until 1927, when aviation operations were transferred to Parafield.

The Aerodrome Post Office opened on 19 August 1925. It was renamed Aero Park in 1945 and Albert Park in 1967, before closing in 1987.

== Geography ==
The suburb lies on the western side of the Port Road-West Lakes Boulevard intersection.

== Demographics ==
The 2021 census by the Australian Bureau of Statistics counted 1,780 persons in Albert Park on census night. Of these, 47.9% were male and 52.1% were female.

The majority of residents (76.3%) are of Australian birth, with other top census responses being India (3.3%) and England (2.6%).

The age distribution of Albert Park residents is skewed slightly higher than the greater Australian population. 79% of residents were over 25 years in 2021, compared to the Australian average of 76%; and 21% were younger than 25 years, compared to the Australian average of 24%.

== Politics ==
=== Local government ===
Albert Park is part of West Woodville Ward in the City of Charles Sturt local government area, being represented in that council by Tolley Wasylenko and Angela Keneally.

=== State and federal ===
Albert Park lies in the state electoral district of Cheltenham and the federal electoral division of Port Adelaide. The suburb is represented in the South Australian House of Assembly by Jay Weatherill and federally by Mark Butler.

== Community ==
=== Schools ===
Our Lady Queen of Peace School is located on Botting Street.

=== Churches ===
Our Lady Queen of Peace Catholic Church is located adjacent to the school.

== Transportation ==
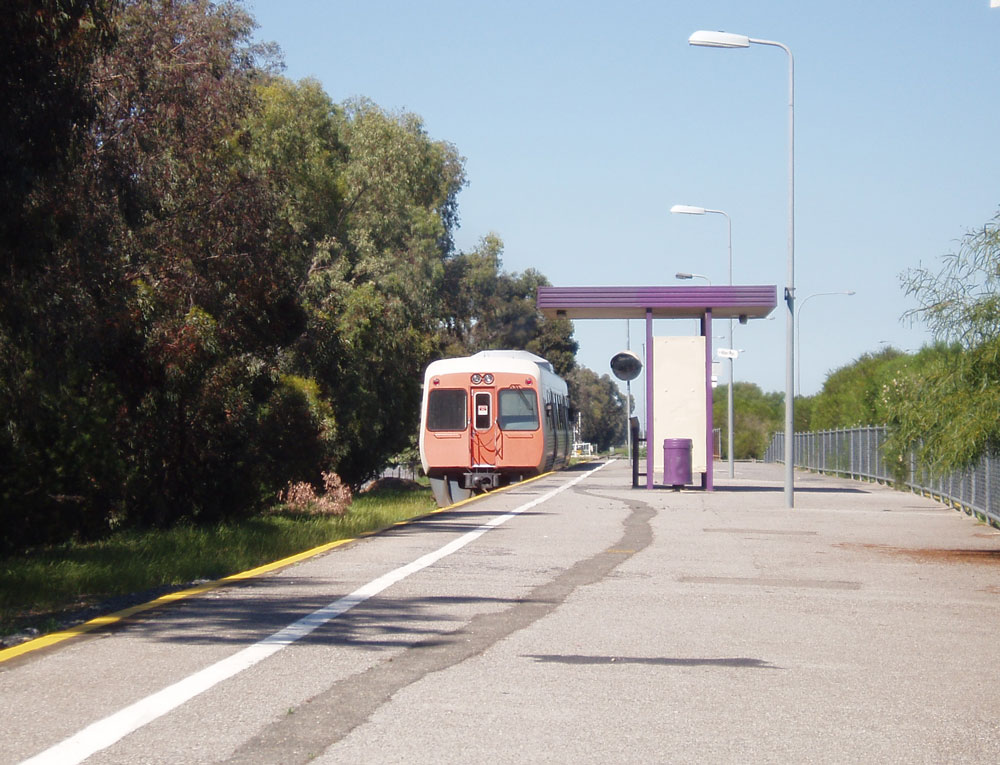
TransAdelaide railcar departing Albert Park railway station.

=== Roads ===
Albert Park is serviced by Port Road, linking the suburb to Port Adelaide and Adelaide city centre, and West Lakes Boulevard, which connects Albert Park to the shopping facilities at West Lakes.

=== Public transport ===
Albert Park is serviced by public transport run by the Adelaide Metro.

==== Trains ====
The Grange railway line passes beside the suburb. The closest station is Albert Park.

Between 1940 and 1980, a further branch railway ran from Albert Park to a station within the industrial area of Hendon.

==== Buses ====
The suburb is serviced by bus routes run by the Adelaide Metro.

==== Trams ====
Albert Park was connected to Port Adelaide and other suburbs by tram lines. Tram services were later discontinued.

== See also ==
- List of Adelaide suburbs
