= Cheltenham, South Australia =

Cheltenham
- Suburb
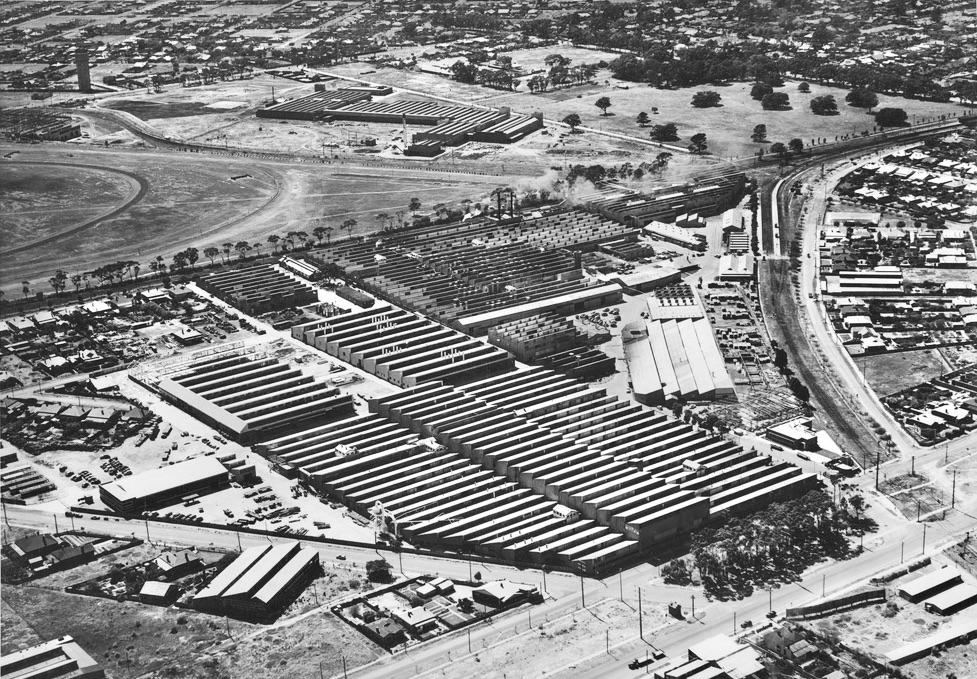
- Holden Woodville Plant, located in Cheltenham (1939)

- Country: Australia
- State: South Australia
- City: Adelaide
- LGA: City of Charles Sturt
- Location: 9.2 km (5.7 mi) NW of Adelaide city centre
- Established: 1849

Government
  - State electorate: Cheltenham (2011)
  - Federal division: Hindmarsh

Population
  - Total: 2,236 (SAL 2021)
- Postcode: 5014
Suburbs around Cheltenham
Alberton	Rosewater	Pennington
Queenstown	Cheltenham	Woodville
Albert Park	Albert Park	Woodville

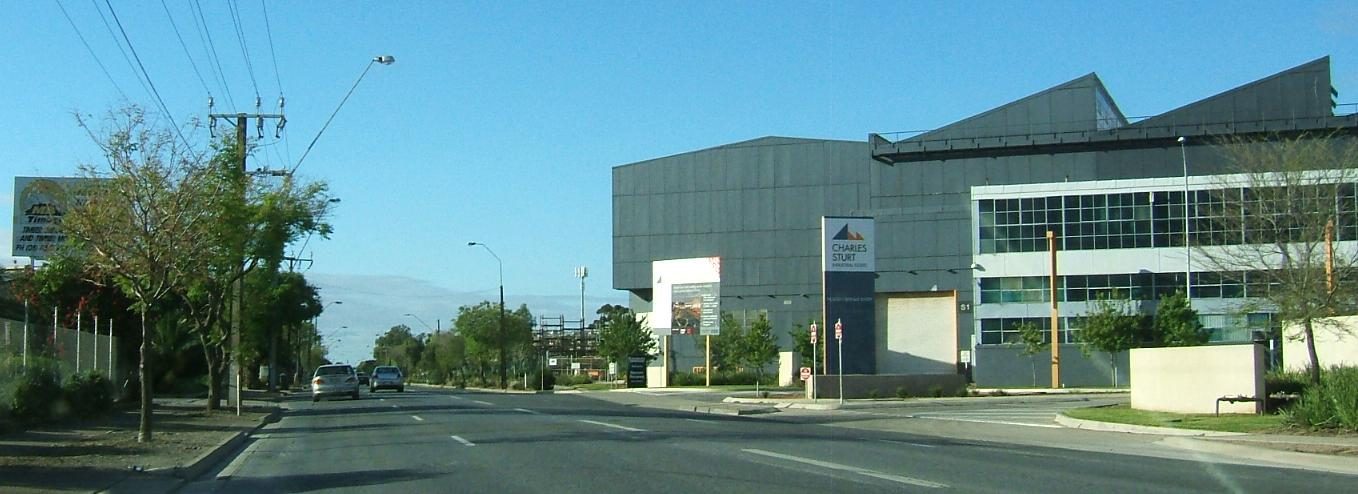
Industrial establishment in Cheltenham

Cheltenham is a suburb of Adelaide, South Australia. It is located in the City of Charles Sturt.

== Geography ==
The suburb lies between Port Road and Cheltenham Parade, which form its southwest and eastern boundaries respectively. The suburb is split in two by the Outer Harbor railway line.

== History ==
Cheltenham Post Office opened on 8 February 1897 and closed in 1910.

In 1923, Holden Motor Body Builders established a 23.5-acre (9.5 ha) site known as the Holden Woodville Plant in Cheltenham. Three years later it had expanded to 40 acres (16 ha) and was employing 5,500 people.

The plant attracted a lot of people to live in the area and especially in the adjacent suburb of Woodville through the 20th century. However, Holden progressively moved its operations to its Elizabeth plant through the 1980s, leading to the closure of Holden Woodville Plant.

== Demographics ==
The 2021 Census by the Australian Bureau of Statistics counted 2,236 persons in Cheltenham on census night. Of these, 48.1% were male and 50.9% were female.

The majority of residents (71.5%) are of Australian birth, with other common census responses being England (5.3%) and India (2.5%).

The age distribution of Cheltenham residents is similar to that of the greater Australian population. 71.3% of residents were over 25 years in 2006, compared to the Australian average of 69.9%; and 28.7% were younger than 25 years, compared to the Australian average of 30.1%.

== Politics ==
=== Local government ===
Cheltenham is part of Woodville Ward in the City of Charles Sturt local government area, being represented in that council by Oanh Nguyen and Robert Grant.

=== State and federal ===
Cheltenham lies in the state electoral district of Cheltenham and the federal electoral division of Hindmarsh. The suburb is represented in the South Australian House of Assembly by Joe Szakacs and federally by Mark Butler.

== Facilities and attractions ==
=== Cheltenham Cemetery ===
Cheltenham Cemetery, located between Port Road and Cheltenham Parade, was established in 1876.

== Transportation ==
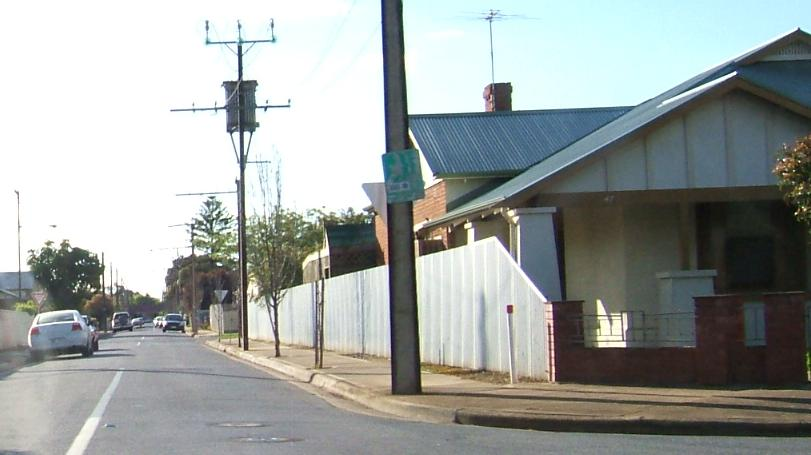
Street in Cheltenham.

=== Roads ===
Cheltenham is serviced by Port Road, connecting the suburb to Port Adelaide and Adelaide city centre, and by Cheltenham Parade.

=== Public transport ===
Cheltenham is serviced by public transport run by the Adelaide Metro.

==== Rail ====
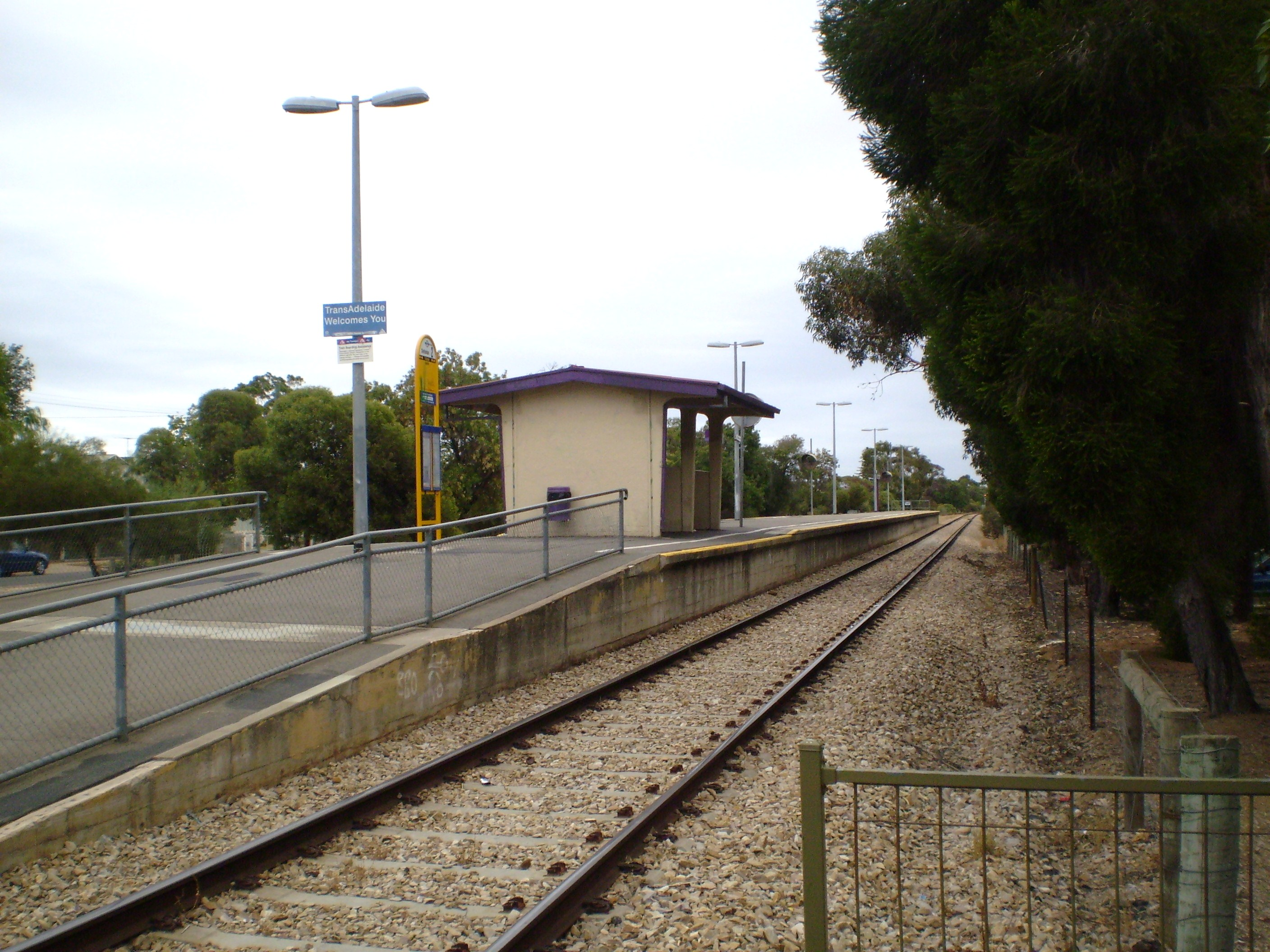
Cheltenham railway station

The Outer Harbor railway line passes through the suburb. The closest stations are Cheltenham and Cheltenham Racecourse. (now closed).

Trams previously ran through Cheltenham, but the lines were removed.

==== Buses ====
The suburb is serviced by bus routes run by the Adelaide Metro.

== See also ==
- List of Adelaide suburbs
