= Woodville South, South Australia =

Woodville South
- Suburb
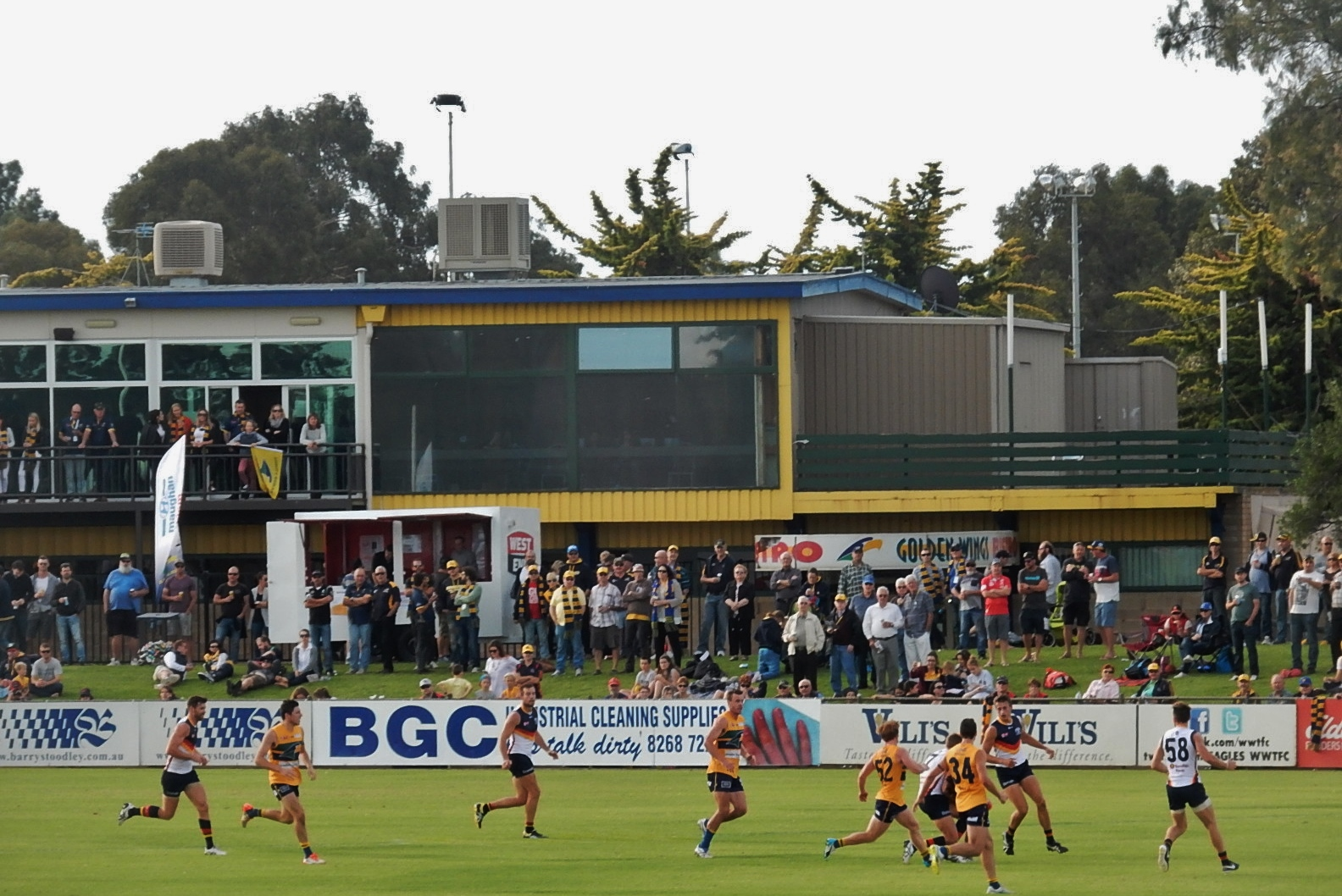
- Woodville Oval

- Interactive map of Woodville South
- Country: Australia
- State: South Australia
- City: Adelaide
- LGA: City of Charles Sturt

Government
  - Federal division: Hindmarsh

Population
  - Total: 3,464 (SAL 2021)
- Postcode: 5011

Woodville South is a suburb of Adelaide, South Australia. It lies within the City of Charles Sturt.

Woodville South is adjacent to the suburbs of Woodville West, Woodville, Woodville Park, Beverley, and Findon.

Woodville South is the location of the Queen Elizabeth Hospital, one of Adelaide's main hospitals, as well as Woodville Oval, the home of South Australian National Football League team, the Woodville-West Torrens Eagles.

Woodville South Post Office opened on 1 June 1960 and closed in 1974.

The former suburb of Tenterden (variously spelled as Tenterdon) now forms the north-western portion of Woodville South.

== Heritage ==
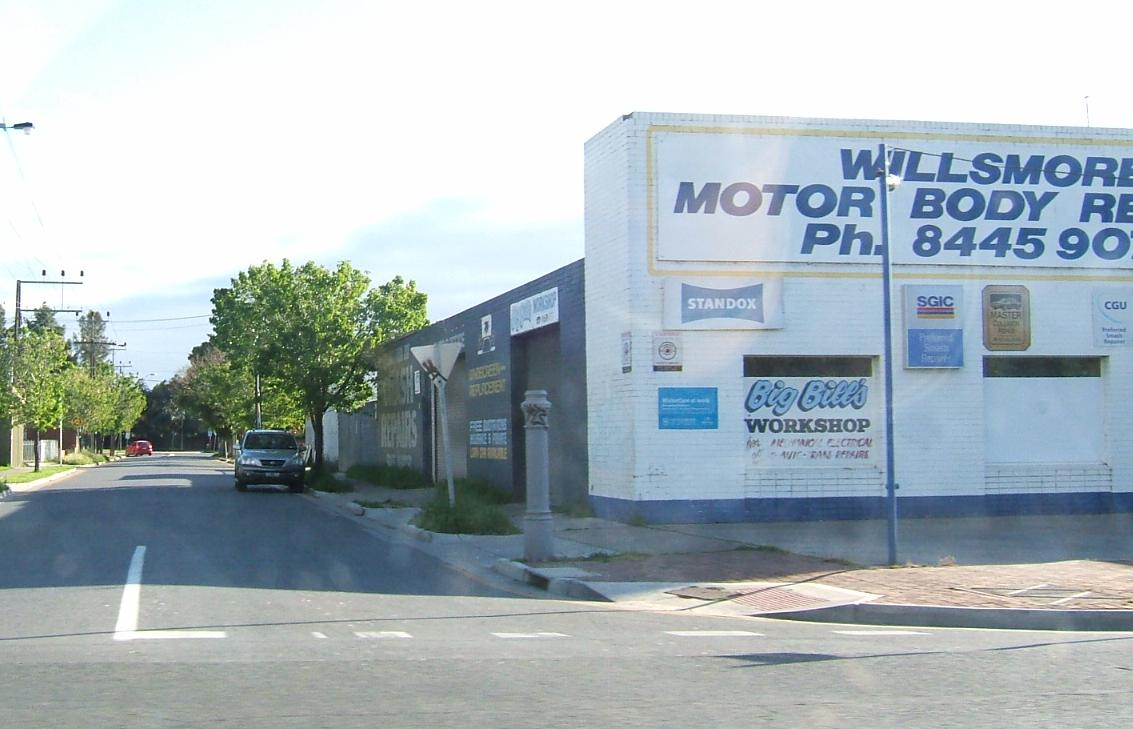
Streetscape in Woodville South, Port Road.

Woodville South contains a number of buildings of local heritage significance, recorded in the City of Charles Sturt's Development Plan. These include the original stone building of Woodville Primary School on Port Road, as well as the adjacent stone cottage to the west, and the Uniting Church complex located at 44a Woodville Road, which includes a church, manse and Sunday School building. Also listed is the Woodville Hotel, located on Port Road. Houses with local heritage significance include those at 100 Ledger Road and 2-4 Tenterden Street. A number of homes within Woodville South are listed as contributing towards the historic character of an Historic Conservation Area which incorporates parts of the suburbs of Woodville, Woodville Park and Woodville South. These include houses in Angus Street, Cedar Avenue, Glen Eira Street, Glen Rowan Road, Glengarry Street, Glenhuntley Street and Oval Avenue. These streets are notable for their high concentration of Tudor-style bungalows.
