= Thomas Henry Brooker =

Australian politician

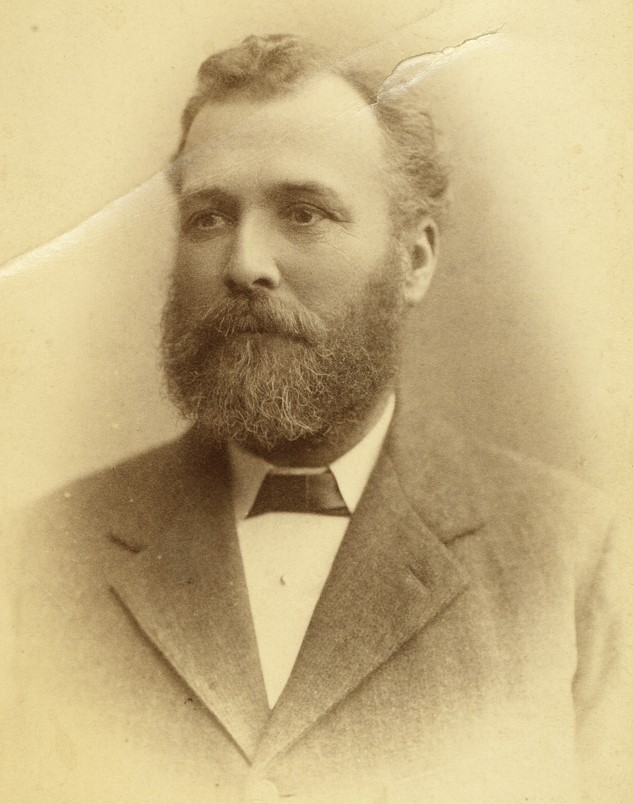
- Photograph of Thomas Henry Brooker, 1900.

Personal details
- Born: 30 December 1850 Kensington, South Australia
- Died: 11 July 1927 (aged 76) Norwood, South Australia
- Occupation: Politician, salesman, merchant

Thomas Henry Brooker (30 December 1850 – 11 July 1927) was a politician in colonial South Australia. He was a member of the South Australian House of Assembly from 1890 to 1905, representing West Torrens (1890–1902) and Port Adelaide (1902–1905). He was Minister for Education and Minister for Industry in the Jenkins ministry from May 1901 to March 1902.

== History ==
T. H. Brooker was born in Kensington, England, and arrived at Port Adelaide with his parents, William Brooker (c. 1826 – 24 January 1909), bricklayer, and his wife Jane, née Gemmell, on the Caroline in April 1855, and spent the greater part of his life in the West Torrens district. His father was severely injured in a building collapse at Port Adelaide, and had to abandon his trade in 1875 for a position as Hindmarsh poundkeeper.

For 15 years he worked for Thomas Hardy at Bankside (now Torrensville and Underdale, learning a good deal about primary production. Subsequently he worked as a salesman and wood merchant at Ridleyton.

By 1887 he was a greengrocer in Carrondown (today's Brompton), and was elected a Councillor for Brompton Ward in the Hindmarsh Corporation, and acted in that capacity for five years. In December 1891 he was elected without opposition as Mayor of Hindmarsh, succeeding Joseph Vardon, and served for one year. He was elected as an Independent Liberal to the South Australian House of Assembly multi-member seats of West Torrens from April 1890 to March 1902 and Port Adelaide from May 1902 to May 1905, holding his seat during the regime of four Governments. In 1898 he was made Government Whip in succession to (later Sir) Richard Butler, and in 1901 followed Lee Batchelor as Minister of Education and Industry in the Jenkins ministry. He resigned his portfolio in 1902 when the size of Cabinet was reduced. He was a Vice President of the Homestead League, and a supporter of the Village Settlement scheme.

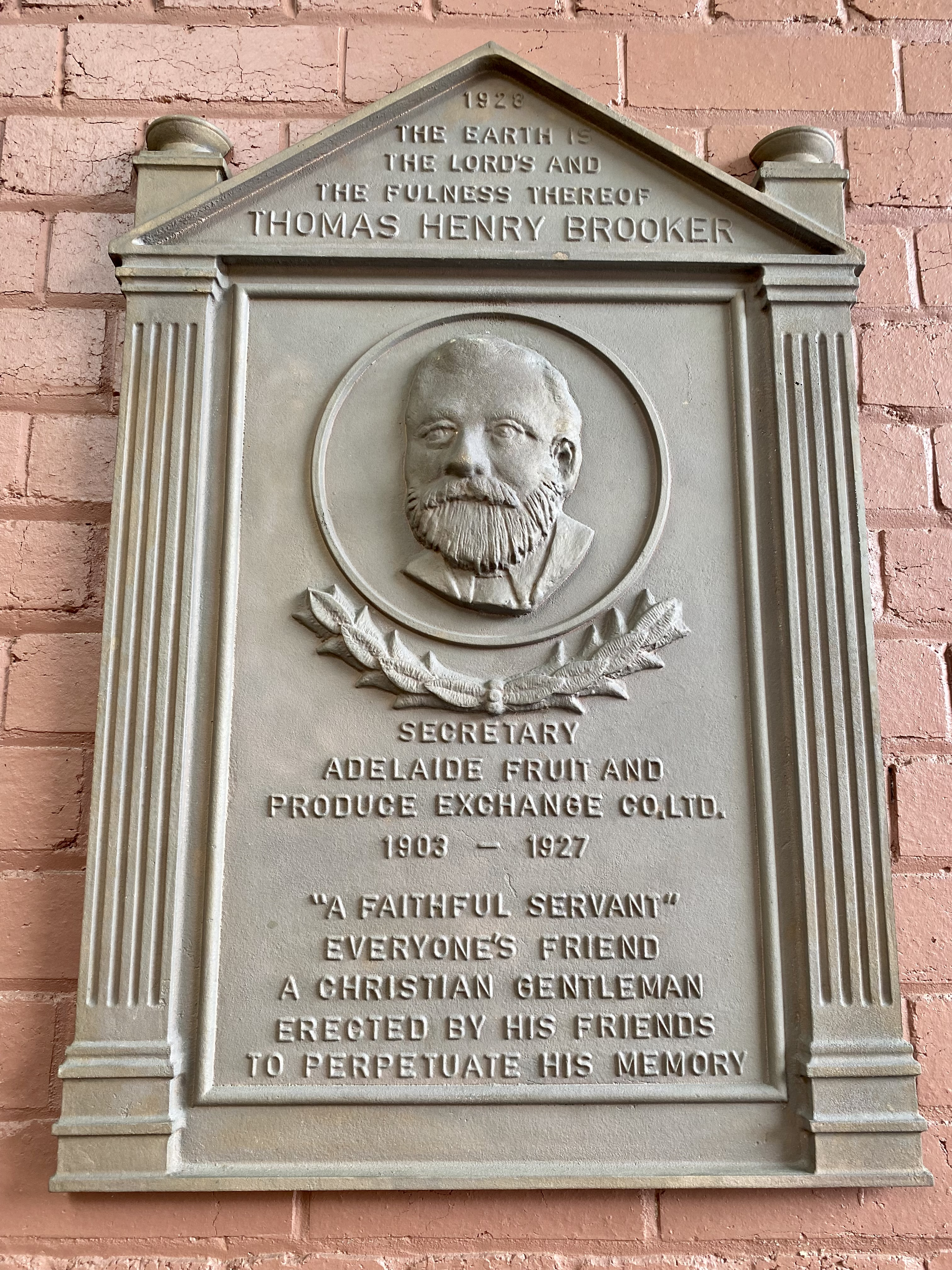
Plaque to Thomas Henry Brooker at the Adelaide Fruit and Produce Exchange Building, Adelaide.

On retiring from politics Brooker, with Joseph Vardon and William Charlick, helped establish the Fruit and Produce Exchange, of which he became the secretary in 1903, and played a substantial part in the development of the East End Market.

== Other interests ==
In the early 1880s he helped to start the Hindmarsh Literary Society. For many years he was a member of the Adelaide Licensing Bench. He was a member of the Board of Governors of the Botanic Garden for nearly 34 years, and Chairman for 30 years, having succeeded Sir Henry Ayers, and was responsible for much of its development. He was a lifelong member of the Church of Christ, Robert street. Hindmarsh, filling many positions, including trustee and elder of the church, and superintendent of the Sunday school, reputedly the first Church of Christ Sunday school in Australia.

Brooker was a great sports lover, proficient at cricket and tennis. He was a keen fisherman, and although never a footballer, he was one of the founders of the West Torrens Football Club, and for 13 years its President.

== Family ==
Brooker married Emma Tume (c. 1850 – 28 March 1920) on 6 March 1870; their children included:

- William Henry Brooker (1870 – 1962) married Nellie Inez Alvorado on 29 September 1897
- Elizabeth May Brooker (1872 – ) married William Lambert Glastonbury on 8 April 1892
- Hamilton Thompson Brooker (1878 – 1970) married Susannah Parsons on 11 July 1912
- Daisy Gemmell Brooker (1882 – ) married Edward Charles Clarke on 8 December 1910
- Ella Myrtle Brooker (1883 – ) married Clarence Ferdinand Rainsford on 9 January 1907
- Ivy Muriel Brooker (1888 – ) married Charles Stuart Munro on 25 March 1909
- Doris Fern Brooker (1891 – ) married Alick D. W. Lawrie on 15 March 1913

His grandchildren included Dr. Kevin Glastonbury and Mr. Vivian M. Brooker of Braybrook, Victoria.

After his wife died in 1920, Brooker lived with his daughter Doris Lawrie at Aveland avenue. North Norwood.

His siblings included William Brooker ( – 10 November 1931), who married Elizabeth Mary Brown on 27 October 1870, and were parents of Rev. W. C. Brooker; John Brooker (10 September 1861 – 1 March 1947), founder of preserved fruit business Brooker & Sons in Croydon; and Mary Brooker (c. 1867 – January 1929) who married James Walter Snook on 6 October 1890.

== See also ==
- Hundred of Brooker
