= Dom Whiting =

British DJ (born 1995)

- Born: Dominic Norman Whiting; December 1995 (age 30)
- Origin: High Wycombe, Buckinghamshire, England
- Genre: Drum and bass
- Occupation: Disk jockey
- Years active: 2020–present
- Website: domwhiting.co.uk

Dominic Norman Whiting (born December 1995) is a British DJ known for hosting events in which he plays drum and bass music on a turntable affixed to a bike while riding slowly through the streets of various cities. He livestreams these events as part of his Drum & Bass on the Bike series, accompanied by crowds of people on bikes, on other modes of transport such as skateboards, and on foot.

Beginning his career working for drum and bass collective Audio Venom and subsequently being unable to hold events during the United Kingdom's COVID-19 lockdown, he began livestreaming his DJ bike rides in 2021, first doing so in Marlow, Buckinghamshire. Since then, he has hosted ride-along events in cities throughout the UK and Europe as well as in Australia.

== Early life and career ==
Whiting was born in December 1995, and is from High Wycombe in Buckinghamshire, England, located north-west of London. He worked as a DJ for the local events company and house music and drum and bass collective Audio Venom, also working a day job running a car repair business.

== Drum & Bass on the Bike ==
As a result of the United Kingdom's COVID-19 lockdown, Audio Venom were not legally permitted to host indoor parties for many months, causing Whiting to become frustrated. He has stated that "one night" in March 2021, a friend suggested the idea of DJing on a bike to him. Though he did not initially take the suggestion seriously, he later "realised that it was probably the best way possible to be moving and DJing." He saw DJing while riding a bike as a permissible alternative to indoor parties which were banned as a result of the lockdown. Whiting bought a standard three-wheeled bike from eBay, then customised it by fixing his turntables to it as well as other heavy modifications to meet his requirements.

Whiting had initially decided to DJ on the bike while staying still, though first decided to ride the bike at the same time in Marlow, Buckinghamshire. He has stated that it did not take him a long time to learn to simultaneously mix tracks and ride the bike, taking only a few attempts. This first riding event was not attended by others. Whiting has said that the first instance of people joining him for the ride was in Bristol. In May 2021, over 100 people accompanied Whiting at an event he held in Brighton, and by June that year he had gained a total of 2.2 million views on his YouTube channel, having hosted around 12 livestreamed Drum & Bass on the Bike events. For the mental health charity Buckinghamshire Mind, he undertook a 16-mile charity ride from High Wycombe to Maidenhead, raising £1,500.

In May 2024, he was scheduled to play at the Love Saves The Day festival in Bristol. By July 2024, Whiting had hosted ride-along events in Ibiza, Belgium, Berlin, Switzerland, and Barcelona, and had over 800,000 social media followers. By February 2025, Whiting had obtained nearly 400,000 followers on Instagram and TikTok. That month, he was scheduled to begin a Drum & Bass on the Bike Weekender, as part of the Adelaide Fringe in Australia, riding through Bowden and Brompton on Saturday, February 22 before performing in situ shows at Hindley Street Music Hall and the Lion Arts Factory. In March, Whiting brought his cat with him on one of the rides in London.

== Method ==
As of 2024, Whiting records his livestreams using a GoPro camera. His setup also includes a power generator, decks, speakers, and an internet source. To distribute the music throughout the crowd, he has a fleet of up to six other bikes with 12 speakers, and other people bring their own sound systems to contribute, playing music from Whiting's livestreams. Whiting's bike rides stay at low speeds, allowing all ages to take part on various modes of transport including bikes, skateboards, and rollerblades, as well as on foot. He follows specific routes imposed by police when required, such as in Bournemouth in 2025, to avoid disruption. He has stated that those riding with him may not be dedicated music fans, "but because they like cycling, they will listen to drum bass for that day."
