= Croydon Park =

Croydon Park may refer to:

- Croydon Park, New South Wales, a suburb of Sydney
- Croydon Park, South Australia, a suburb of Adelaide
- List of parks and open spaces in the London Borough of Croydon
