= West Hindmarsh, South Australia =

West Hindmarsh
- Suburb
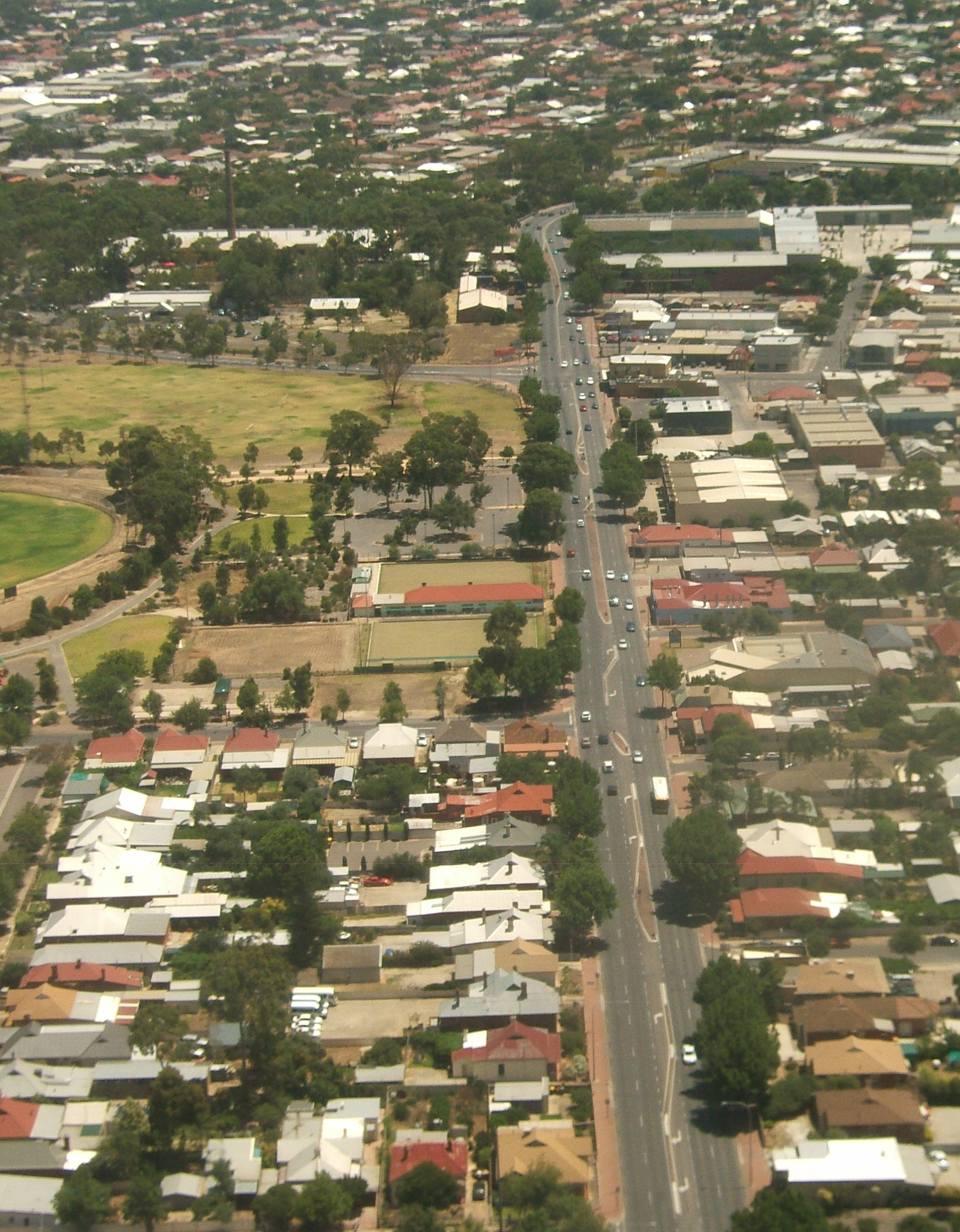
- West Hindmarsh, aerial view

- Country: Australia
- State: South Australia
- City: Adelaide
- LGA: City of Charles Sturt
- Location: 4 km (2.5 mi) northwest of Adelaide city centre

Government
  - State electorates: Croydon; West Torrens
  - Federal division: Adelaide

Population
  - Total: 1,560 (SAL 2021)
- Postcode: 5007
Suburbs around West Hindmarsh
| West Croydon | Croydon | Ridleyton |
| Welland | West Hindmarsh | Hindmarsh |
| Torrensville | Torrensville | Thebarton |

West Hindmarsh is a suburb of Adelaide, located in the City of Charles Sturt local government area. It is around 4 km west northwest of the Adelaide city centre. It is bounded on the south by the River Torrens, east by South Road, north by Port Road and west by streets separating it from the suburb of Welland which has the same north and south boundaries. Grange Road crosses the middle of the suburb.

A Hindmarsh West Post Office opened around 1950 and closed in 1981.

== Demographics ==
The 2016 Census by the Australian Bureau of Statistics counted 1,535 persons in West Hindmarsh on census night. Of these, 49.3% were male and 50.7% were female.

The majority of residents (63.6%) are of Australian birth, with other common census responses being India (4.5%), Italy (3.9%), Greece (3.1%), England (3.1%), and China (1.9%). Additionally, people of Aboriginal and/or Torres Strait Islander descent made up 0.9% of the suburb.

In terms of religious affiliation, 35.7% of residents attributed themselves to being irreligious, 22.4% attributed themselves to being Catholic, 10.0% attributed themselves to be Eastern Orthodox, and 4.2% attributed themselves to being Anglican. Within Allenby Gardens, 92.8% of the residents were employed, with the remaining 7.2% being unemployed.

== Politics ==
=== Local government ===
Welland is part of Beverly Ward in the City of Charles Sturt local government area, with representative councillors, Labor member Matt Mitchell and Independent Edgar Agius.

=== State and federal ===
Welland lies in the state electoral district of Croydon and West Torrens and the federal electoral division of Adelaide. The suburb is represented in the South Australian House of Assembly by leader of the South Australian opposition, Labor member Peter Malinauskas (Croydon) as well as Labor Member Tom Koutsantonis (West Torrens), and federally by Steve Georganas.

== Education ==
West Hindmarsh's education is serviced by the St Joseph's Hindmarsh Primary school, an independent Catholic school which accommodates R-6 learning on the northern side of Grange road.

== Facilities ==
=== Parks ===
West Hindmarsh has 3 parks within the suburb, the Wallman Reserve, the McDonnell Reserve, and the Langman Reserve.
