= Renown Park, South Australia =

Renown Park
- Suburb
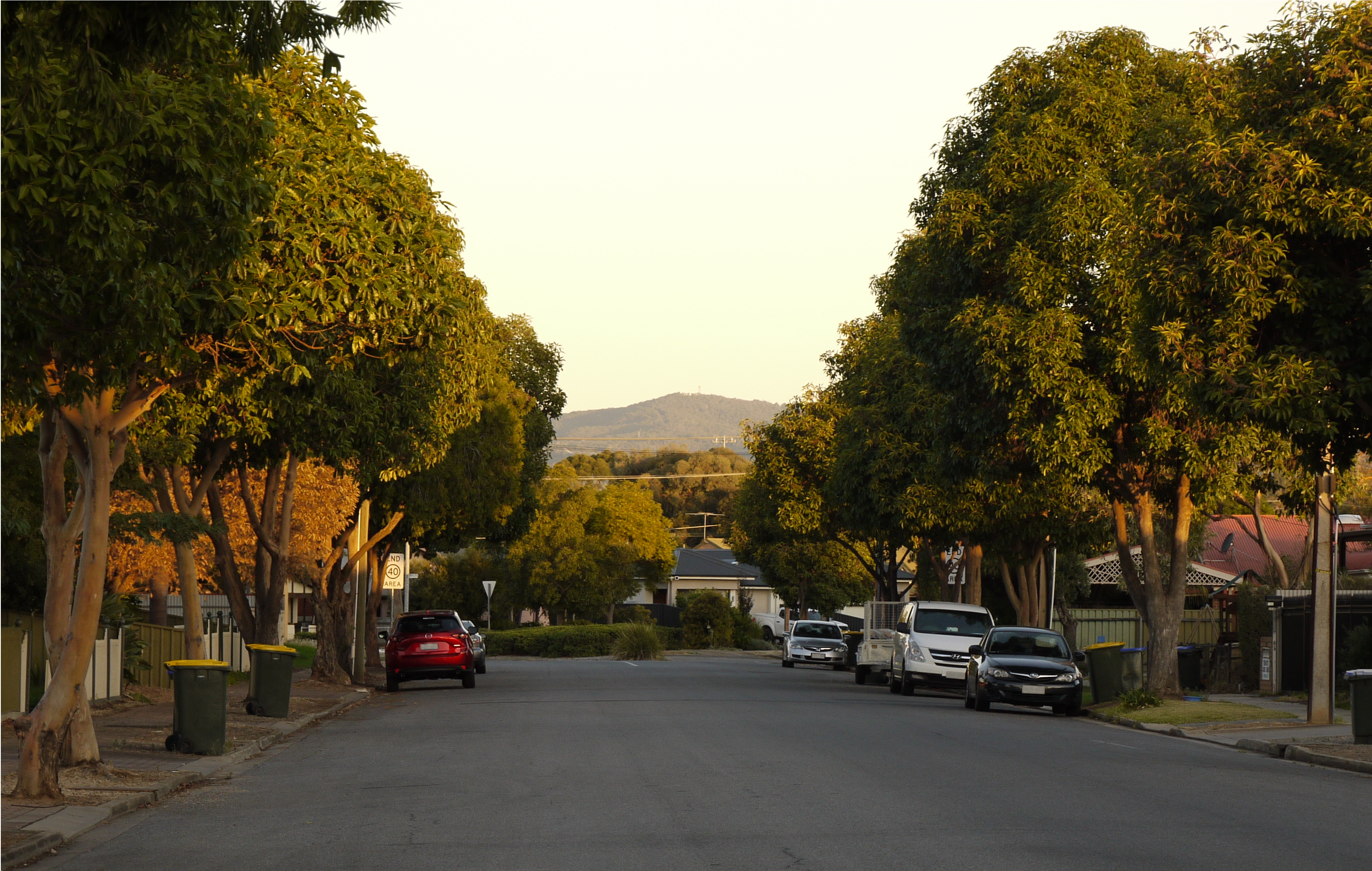
- Bishop Street, Renown Park

- Country: Australia
- State: South Australia
- City: Adelaide
- LGA: City of Charles Sturt
- Location: 4.1 km (2.5 mi) NE of Adelaide city centre
- Established: 1920

Government
  - State electorate: Croydon (2011)
  - Federal division: Adelaide (2019)

Population
  - Total: 1,663 (SAL 2021)
- Postcode: 5008
Suburbs around Renown Park
West Croydon	Croydon Park, Devon Park	Devon Park
Ridleyton, Croydon	Renown Park	Prospect
Brompton, Ridleyton	Bowden	Ovingham

Renown Park is an inner northern suburb of Adelaide, South Australia. It is located in the City of Charles Sturt.

== Geography ==
The suburb lies between Torrens Road and the Gawler railway line, which form its southwestern and eastern boundaries, respectively, with South Road intersecting the suburb in the east.

== History ==
The suburb was established in 1920. It emerged from the sale of land belonging to a John McQuillan upon his death. The land was described in an advertisement as "that fine level area just beyond the Ovingham railway-station". The suburb was named in 1920 shortly after HMS Renown brought the Prince of Wales to Australia.

Renown Park west of South Road was serviced by the City–Cheltenham tram line along Torrens Road, but this line was removed in 1958.

== Demographics ==
The 2021 Census by the Australian Bureau of Statistics counted 1,663 persons in Renown Park on census night. Of these, 50.1% were male and 49.9% were female. The median age of Renown's park residents was 37, 4 years younger than the state median of 41.

The majority of residents (55.9%) were of Australian birth, with other common census responses being Vietnam (8.4%), India (5.8%), China (3.2%), Greece (1.9%), and England (1.4%). Additionally, people of Aboriginal and/or Torres Strait Islander descent made up 2.2% of the suburb.

In terms of religious affiliation, 38.2% of residents attributed themselves to being irreligious, 18.6% attributed themselves to being Catholic, 7.5% attributed themselves to be Eastern Orthodox, and 5.5% attributed themselves to being Buddhist. Within Renown Park, 92.7% of the residents were employed, with the remaining 7.3% being unemployed.

== Community ==
The local newspaper is the Weekly Times Messenger. Other regional and national newspapers such as The Advertiser and The Australian are also available.

=== Schools ===
Brompton Primary School is located on Napier Street.

== Facilities and attractions ==
=== Parks ===
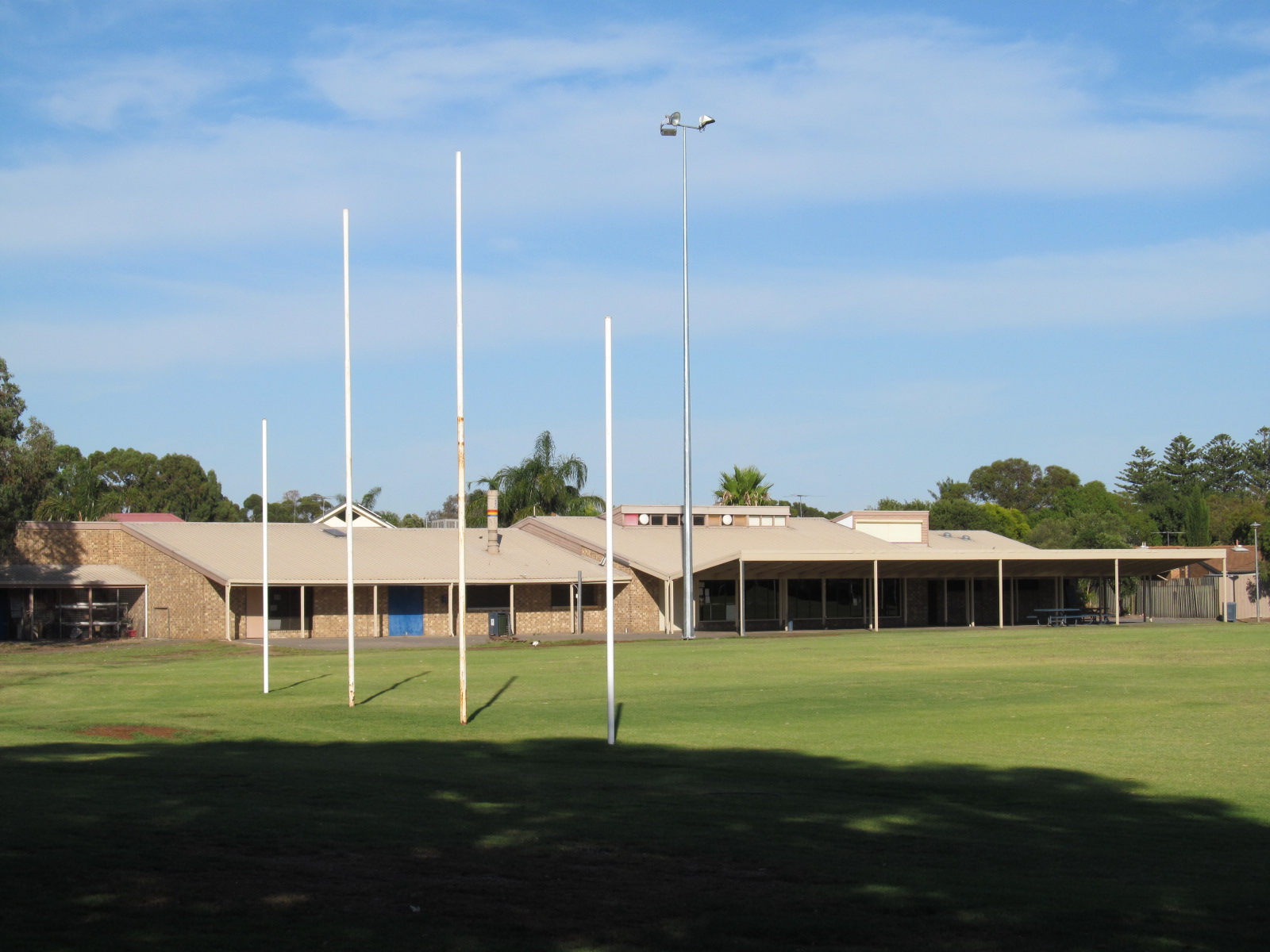
Sam Johnson Sportsground

Sam Johnson Sportsground is located between Bolingbroke Avenue and Cavan Avenue, as well as Angus Reserve just off of Angus Court.

== Transportation ==
=== Roads ===
Renown Park is serviced by South Road, linking the suburb to the far north and south of Adelaide, and Torrens Road, which connects Renown Park with Adelaide city centre.

=== Public transport ===
Renown Park is serviced by public transport run by the Adelaide Metro.

==== Trains ====
The Gawler railway line passes beside the suburb. The closest station is Ovingham, on Renown Park's southeastern boundary.

==== Buses ====
The suburb is serviced by bus routes run by the Adelaide Metro.

== See also ==
- List of Adelaide suburbs
