= Croydon Park, South Australia =

Croydon Park
- Suburb
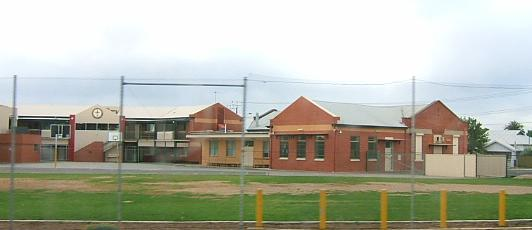
- St Margaret Mary's Primary School on Torrens Road

- Country: Australia
- State: South Australia
- City: Adelaide
- LGA: City of Port Adelaide Enfield

Government
  - State electorate: Croydon
  - Federal division: Adelaide

Population
  - Total: 4,230 (SAL 2021)
- Postcode: 5008
Suburbs around Croydon Park
Woodville Gardens	Ferryden Park	Regency Park
Kilkenny	Croydon Park	Dudley Park
West Croydon	Croydon	Renown Park

Croydon Park is a north-western suburb of Adelaide 5.9 km from the CBD, in the state of South Australia, Australia and is within the City of Port Adelaide Enfield. It is adjacent to Dudley Park, Devon Park, Renown Park, Regency Park, Ferryden Park Kilkenny, and West Croydon. The post code for Croydon Park is 5008. It is bounded to the south by Lamont Street and Torrens Road, to the north by Regency Road and in the east and west by Harrison Road and Goodall Avenue respectively. Croydon Park is predominantly a residential suburb, with a warehousing presence on the northern edges near Regency Road. Croydon Park has been completely divided by the North–South Motorway.

== History ==
Croydon Park was originally used as agricultural land from the time of European settlement to well in to the 1920s. The Shillabeer family owned land in the vicinity that stretched from Torrens Road to Regency Road. The land was initially used as grazing land for dairy cattle with crops such as wheat and barley also being grown there. In the late 1920s the first of the subdivisions began when AW Shillabeer sold some of his land to developers. The majority of the houses built in the Croydon Park area were built from the late 1930s onwards.

After World War II a large part of the suburb was developed into a housing estate for returned soldiers. It subsequently attracted waves of Post-war European immigration. Over time, the children of these residents largely vacated the area, leaving a relatively elderly population. Today however, the area has started to attract interest from many home buyers due to its close proximity to the CBD, and affordable houses on large blocks of land. In response to this some of the industry in the area have relocated to outer suburbs and the land redeveloped for housing.

== Geography ==
Croydon Park lies on both sides of South Road, in the section between Torrens Road and Regency Road. It is a large inner western suburb of Adelaide.

== Facilities ==
The suburb is not served by a public primary school. Croydon Park Primary School was closed at the end of 1997 due to declining enrolments. The former site at Hudson Avenue was later developed into housing. The closest primary schools are Challa Gardens Primary School, to the west in Kilkenny, or Brompton Primary School in Brompton. However, St. Margaret Mary's, a Catholic primary school operates within the suburb. The local high school was Croydon High School (closed 2007), in adjacent West Croydon. The site is currently occupied by the School of Languages and the Adelaide Secondary School of English. Polonia Reserve, was the base for the state league Soccer Team Association football Croydon Kings was located on the eastern side of Croydon Park.

The suburb is well known for its various Vietnamese restaurants and other Asian eateries along Days Road, dubbed 'Little Vietnam'.

== Demography ==
As of 2016 Census, Croydon Park had a population of 3,971: 49.3% female and 50.7% male. The median age of the Croydon Park population was 37 years, the same as the national median of 37. 46.3% of people living in Croydon Park were born in Australia, with the other top responses for country of birth were Vietnam (11.4%), India (4.7%), Greece (4.1%), Italy (2.1%), Myanmar (1.9%).

38.7% of people spoke only English at home; the next most common languages were, 15.3% Vietnamese, 7.6% Greek, 3.6% Italian, 2.4% Mandarin, 2.1% Punjabi. The religious make up of Croydon Park is 22.6% Catholic, 21.2% No Religion, 11.4% Buddhism, and 10.4% Eastern Orthodox, while 1.2% were of Aboriginal and/or Torres Strait Islander descent.

38.2% of people are married, 41.1% have never married and 8.7% are divorced and 3.4% are separated, meanwhile, 49.3% of the people living in Croydon Park are employed full-time, 32.5% are working on a part-time basis and 12.9% are unemployed.

== Politics ==
=== Local government ===
Croydon Park is part of the Parks war of the City of Port Adelaide Enfield local government area, being represented by Labor councillor Kim Dihn, as well as Independents John Croci and Kat Mitchell.

=== State and federal ===
Croydon Park lies in the state electoral district of Croydon and the federal electoral division of Adelaide. The suburb is represented in the South Australian House of Assembly by the Premier of South Australia, Labor party member Peter Malinauskas and federally by Steve Georganas.

== Religion ==
Places of worship include St Margaret Mary's Catholic Church, and the Greek Orthodox Holy Monastery of St Nectarios.

== Transport ==
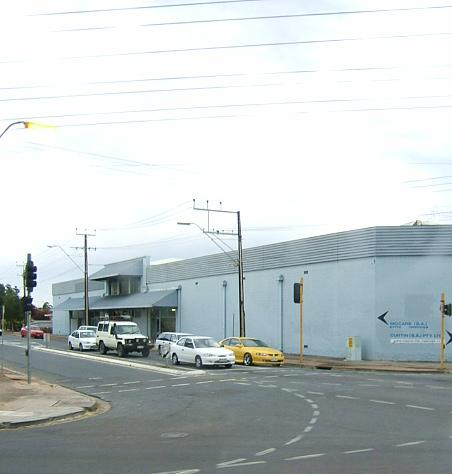
Days Road

The 300, 230 and 232 bus routes serve Regency Road. The 230 serves Days Road. The 232 serves Harrison Road. The 251, 252, 253 and 254 serve Torrens Road. All of the bus routes except 300 travel between Adelaide's CBD and Arndale Central Shopping Centre. The 300 bus is a cross metropolitan circular bus service. These bus routes are all handled by Adelaide Metro.

== Future developments ==
A current review is looking at land use policies applying to a large area of underutilised industrial zoned land at Days Road and Regency Road, Croydon Park. The zoning review is intended to enable the future development of the land for residential, retail, and commercial uses. The current plan includes a shopping precinct along the northern boundary with Regency Rd, with the remaining southern half zoned residential.
