= Hindmarsh Incinerator =

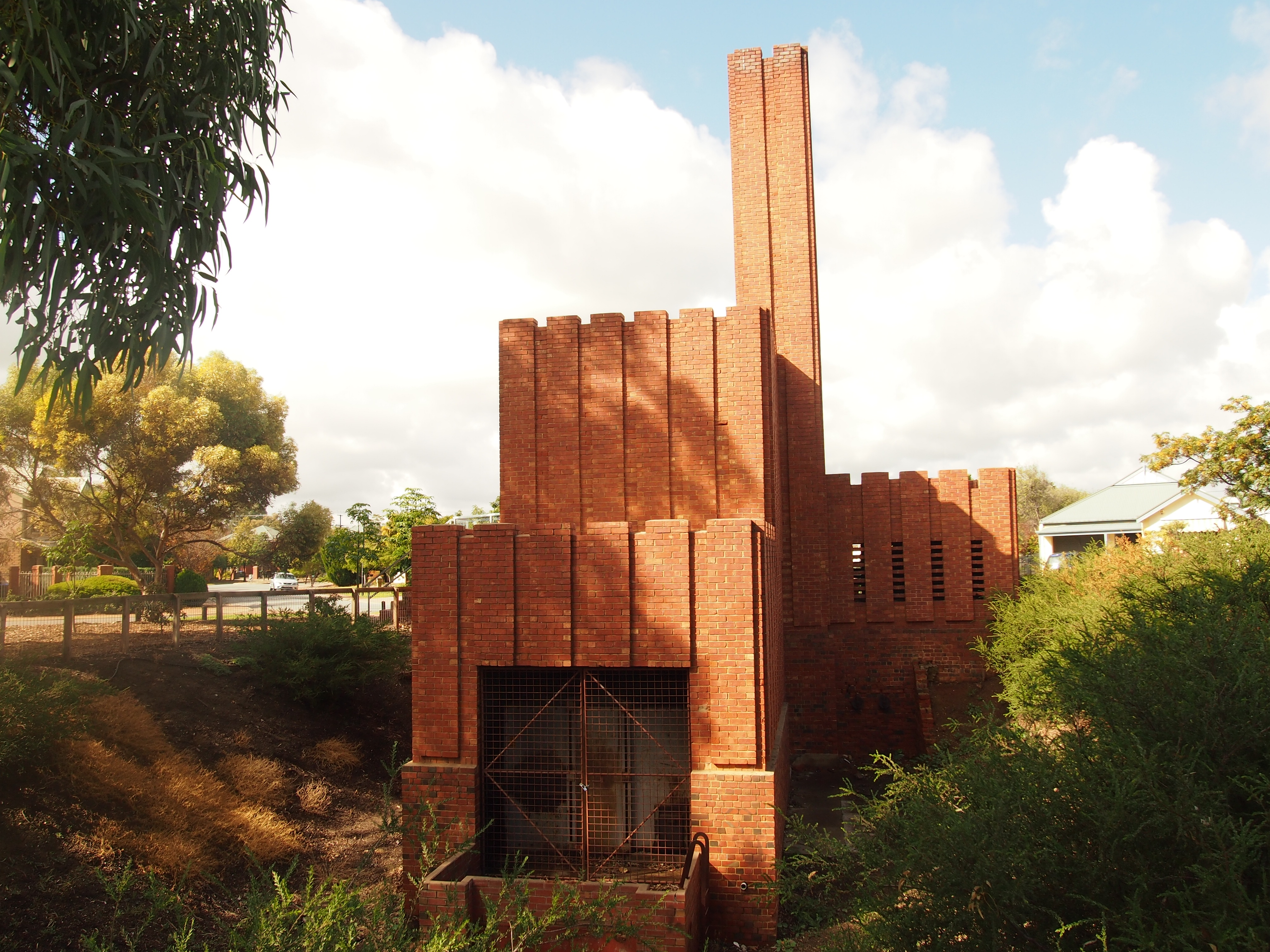
- Hindmarsh Incinerator, designed by Walter Burley Griffin, viewed from the northwest
- Interactive map of the Hindmarsh Incinerator area

General information
- Type: Incinerator
- Location: Opposite 9 Burley Griffin Boulevard, Brompton, Adelaide, South Australia, Australia
- Coordinates: 34.897228°S 138.573321°E
- Completed: 1935
- Client: Reverberatory Incinerator and Engineering Co. Pty. Ltd

Design and construction
- Architect: Walter Burley Griffin
- Designations: South Australian Heritage Register (1980)

The Hindmarsh Incinerator is a decommissioned incinerator located in the Adelaide suburb of Brompton in South Australia, Australia. Designed by Walter Burley Griffin, the architect and designer of Canberra, the incinerator was built in 1935 by the Reverberatory Incinerator and Engineering Co. Pty Ltd. as a means of disposing of household refuse.

The incinerator was listed on the now-defunct Register of the National Estate on 21 March 1978 and on the South Australian Heritage Register on 24 July 1980. It is listed as a nationally significant work of 20th-century architecture by the Australian Institute of Architects.
