= Devon Park, South Australia =

Devon Park
- Suburb
- Coordinates: 34.888°S 138.580°E
- Country: Australia
- State: South Australia
- City: Adelaide
- LGAs: City of Port Adelaide Enfield; City of Charles Sturt
- Location: 4.6 km (2.9 mi) NW of Adelaide city centre
- Established: 1920

Government
  - State electorate: Croydon (2011)
  - Federal division: Adelaide (2011)

Population
  - Total: 1,185 (SAL 2021)
- Postcode: 5008
Suburbs around Devon Park
Croydon Park	Dudley Park	Prospect
Renown Park	Devon Park	Prospect
Renown Park	Renown Park	Prospect

Devon Park is an inner northern suburb of Adelaide, South Australia. It is located in the cities of Port Adelaide Enfield and Charles Sturt beside the Gawler railway line near, but not meeting, the intersection of Torrens Road and Churchill Road.

== History ==
Devon Park was laid out in 1920 on parts of sections 375 and 376 of the Hundred of Yatala by Lavinia and George Braund and was named for their Devonshire, England, the county in which they were born.

== Demographics ==
The 2006 Census by the Australian Bureau of Statistics counted 752 persons in Devon Park on census night. Of these, 48.9% were male and 51.1% were female confirmed from sources cited.

The majority of residents (66.4%) are of Australian birth, with other common census responses being England (5.3%), Italy (2.9%), Greece (2.3%), India (2.1%) and Vietnam (2.0%).

The age distribution of Devon Park residents is skewed higher than the greater Australian population. 75.6% of residents were over 25 years in 2006, compared to the Australian average of 66.5%; and 24.4% were younger than 25 years, compared to the Australian average of 33.5%.

== Governance ==
Devon Park is split between two local government areas. The majority of the suburb is in the City of Port Adelaide Enfield but a small portion in the south lies within the City of Charles Sturt.

Within Port Adelaide Enfield, Devon Park is part of Parks Ward and is represented in that council by Claire Boan and Guy Wilcock.

The Charles Sturt portion of the suburb forms part of that council's Hindmarsh Ward, being represented in that council by Paul Alexandrides and Craig Auricht.

Devon Park lies in the state electoral district of Croydon and the federal electoral division of Adelaide. The suburb is represented in the South Australian House of Assembly by Michael Atkinson and federally by Kate Ellis.

== Transport ==
Devon Park is accessible by car via minor roads leading off of South Road, Torrens Road and Churchill Road.

Devon Park is serviced by public transport run by Adelaide Metro. The Gawler to City train service passes along the suburb's eastern boundary, with Dudley Park railway station being situated at the north east boundary of the suburb. The city-bound 230 and 232 bus routes pass along Harrison Road on the suburb's western boundary.

== Parks ==
Simpson Park is located between Harrison Road and Ashby Crescent at the north western corner of the suburb.

== See also ==
- List of Adelaide suburbs
