= Hindmarsh, South Australia =

Hindmarsh
- Suburb
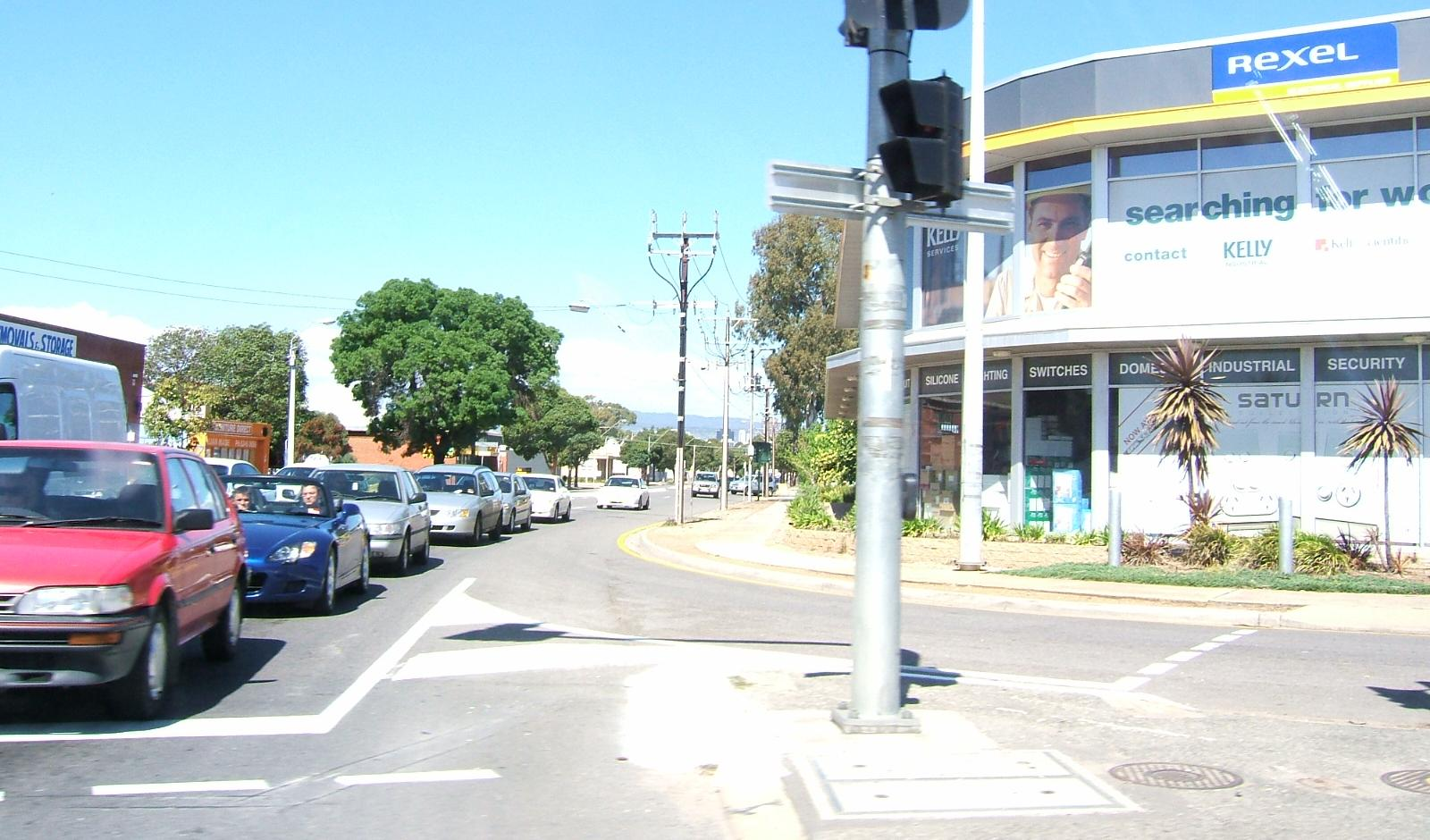
- Manton Street, Hindmarsh

- Coordinates: 34°54′25″S 138°34′12″E
- Country: Australia
- State: South Australia
- City: Adelaide
- LGA: City of Charles Sturt
- Location: 3.5 km (2.2 mi) NW of Adelaide city centre
- Established: c. 1838

Government
  - State electorate: West Torrens
  - Federal division: Adelaide (2011)

Area
  - Total: 0.88 km^{2} (0.34 sq mi)

Population
  - Total: 232 (SAL 2021)
- Postcode: 5007
Suburbs around Hindmarsh
Croydon	Ridleyton	Brompton
West Hindmarsh	Hindmarsh	Bowden
Torrensville	Thebarton, Southwark	Southwark, North Adelaide

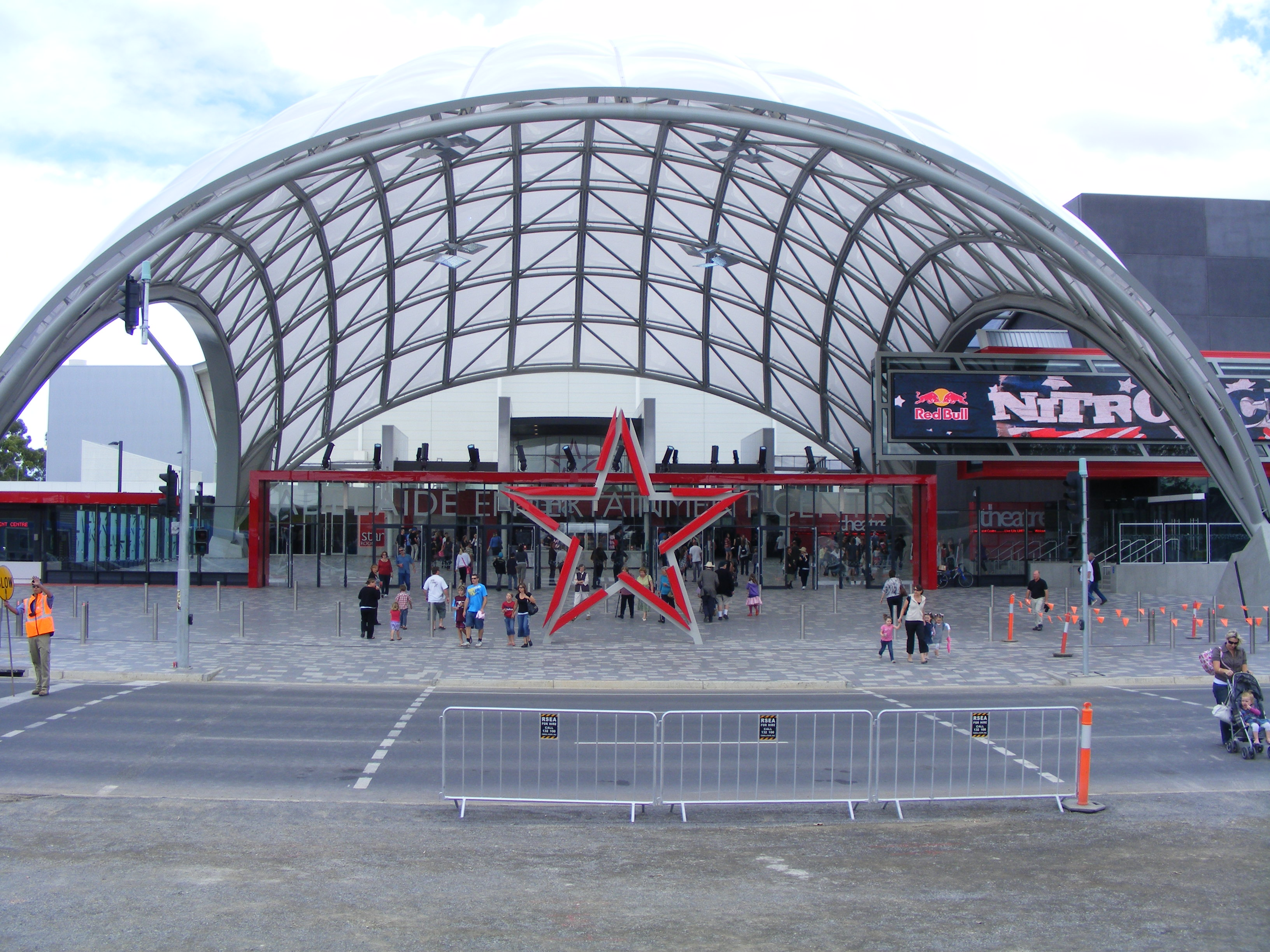
The Adelaide Entertainment Centre, Hindmarsh.

Hindmarsh is an inner suburb of Adelaide, South Australia. It is located in the City of Charles Sturt.

The suburb is located between South Road to the west and North Adelaide. The River Torrens forms its southern boundary and the Grange and Outer Harbor railway lines form the northeast.

== History ==
Before the colonisation of South Australia in 1836, the land now called Hindmarsh was occupied by the Kaurna people.

The suburb was named by South Australia's first Governor, Sir John Hindmarsh. Hindmarsh was the first owner of section 353 in the Hundred of Yatala, being among the earliest to make a selection of a "country section" to which he and other early investors in South Australia were entitled by their purchase of land orders prior to settlement (see Lands administrative divisions of South Australia § Land division history). He and Arthur Lindsay subdivided the land in June 1838 and were responsible for it being laid out as the first private town in the colony of South Australia. In the process, according to South Australian historian Geoffrey Manning, the Governor "acquired a dubious reputation by prohibiting squatting in the Parklands, thus forcing people to acquire land in the subdivision".

In 1916, the old town hall was expanded and extensively refurbished by noted cinema architect Chris A. Smith, to accommodated use as a picture theatre. This was the Star Theatre, one of cinema chain owner Dan Clifford's earliest cinemas. Later known as the Odeon Star, Cinema Italia, Cinema Europa, and Windsor Theatre, the cinema eventually closed in 1990.

The modern suburb of Hindmarsh has western and southern boundaries contiguous with the original village and section 353, the Torrens River being the southern boundary. The modern suburb includes land between Port Road and the railway line as well, making the railway line the northern border instead of Port Road, as it was for the early village.

== Demographics ==
The 2016 Census by the Australian Bureau of Statistics counted 231 persons in Hindmarsh on census night. Of these, 61.1% were male and 38.9% were female.

The majority of residents (66.8%) are of Australian birth, with other common census responses being England (5.2%), South Korea (4.3%), Malaysia (3.8%), Thailand (3.3%), and Italy (1.9%). Additionally, people of Aboriginal and/or Torres Strait Islander descent made up 2.6% of the suburb.

In terms of religious affiliation, 46.8% of residents attributed themselves to being irreligious, 17.9% attributed themselves to being Catholic, 6.8% attributed themselves to be Buddhist, and 6.4% attributed themselves to being Eastern Orthodox. Within Welland, 82.8% of the residents were employed, with the remaining 17.2% being unemployed.

== Politics ==
=== Local government ===
Hindmarsh is part of Beverley Ward in the City of Charles Sturt local government area, being represented in that council by Independent Edgar Agius and Labor Member Matt Mitchell.

=== State and federal ===
Hindmarsh lies in the state electoral district of West Torrens. Prior to the 2016 redistribution, it was in the Croydon district. and the federal electoral division of Adelaide. The suburb is represented in the South Australian House of Assembly by Tom Koutsantonis and federally by Steve Georganas.

== Community ==
The local newspaper is (was?) the Weekly Times Messenger. Other regional and national newspapers such as The Advertiser and The Australian are also available.

== Facilities and attractions ==
=== The Gov ===
The Governor Hindmarsh Hotel, more commonly known as The Gov on Port Road, Hindmarsh, was opened in 1848. It underwent renovations in 1988, but had fallen into disrepair when new owners the Tonkins took over in 1993. "The Gov" was developed into a major and popular live music venue, with five separate performing spaces and featuring a wide range of genres of music. It has attracted performers such as Billy Bragg, Vika and Linda Bull, Paul Kelly and The Whitlams, as well as lesser-known musicians, local schools' annual concerts and weekly open mic sessions in the front bar. The venue has won a number of awards, such as both the AHA(SA) and National AHA awards for Best Live Music Venue in 2017, and it has been inducted into the SA Music Hall of Fame. It has been described as "the city's mecca for live music". Its performance spaces are also used by the Adelaide Fringe each year.

=== Adelaide Entertainment Centre ===
The Adelaide Entertainment Centre is a major venue for all kinds of performances, from small intimate spaces to large concerts. It houses up to 11,300 people.

=== Other venues ===
- The 16,500-seat Hindmarsh Stadium, home to the Adelaide United football club
- Holden Street Theatres, a performing arts precinct
- The Education Development Centre, a conference venue owned by the state Department for Education
- Seven Network's Adelaide studio
- The Hindmarsh Library, a public library servicing the area.

== Heritage listings ==
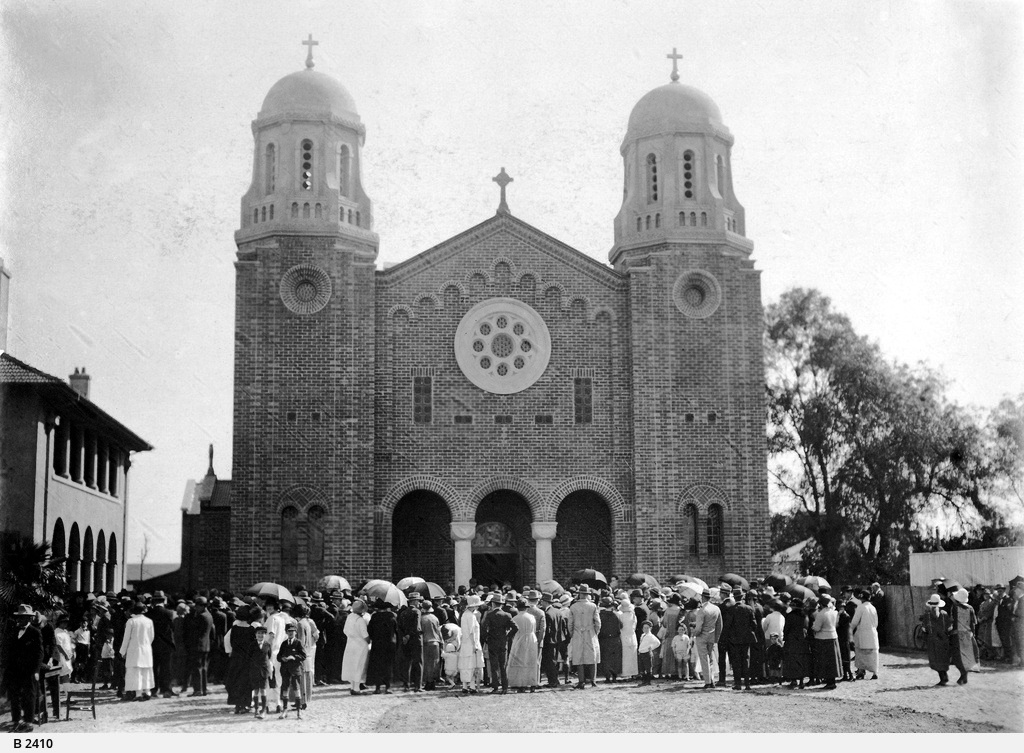
St Saviours, Hindmarsh, at its opening in 1924

- Hindmarsh Town Hall (1936), designed by Christopher Arthur Smith. listed on the South Australian Heritage Register 23 November 1989.
- Sacred Heart Church, Port Road, was designed in Romanesque Revival style by Adelaide architect Herbert Jory of Woods, Bagot, Jory & Laybourne Smith and opened in November 1924 as St Saviour's Church. The church was renamed and dedicated as Sacred Heart Church in 1950. It is a Missionaries of the Sacred Heart (MSC) church. The church and its priory were locally heritage-listed by the council on 12 September 2017.

== Transport ==
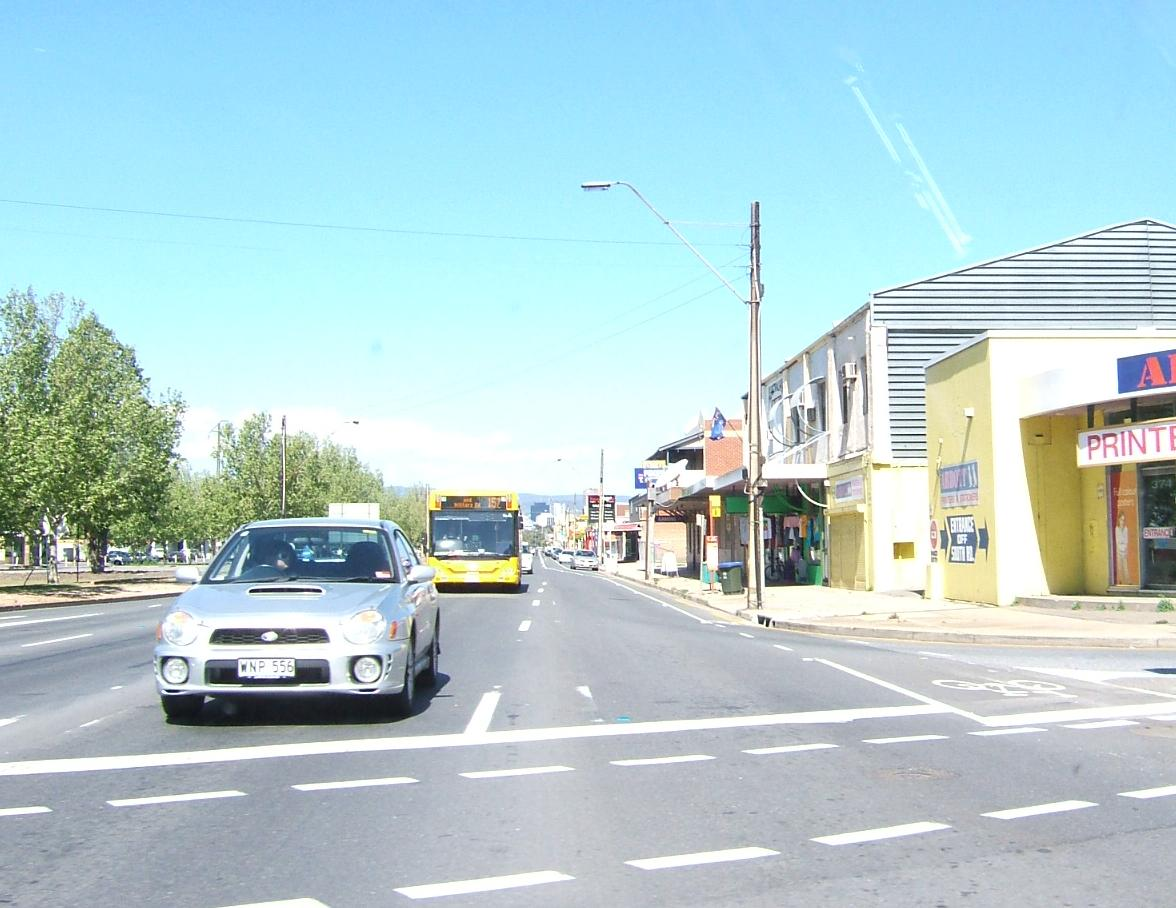
Port Road and South Road, two of Adelaide's major arteries, intersect in Hindmarsh.

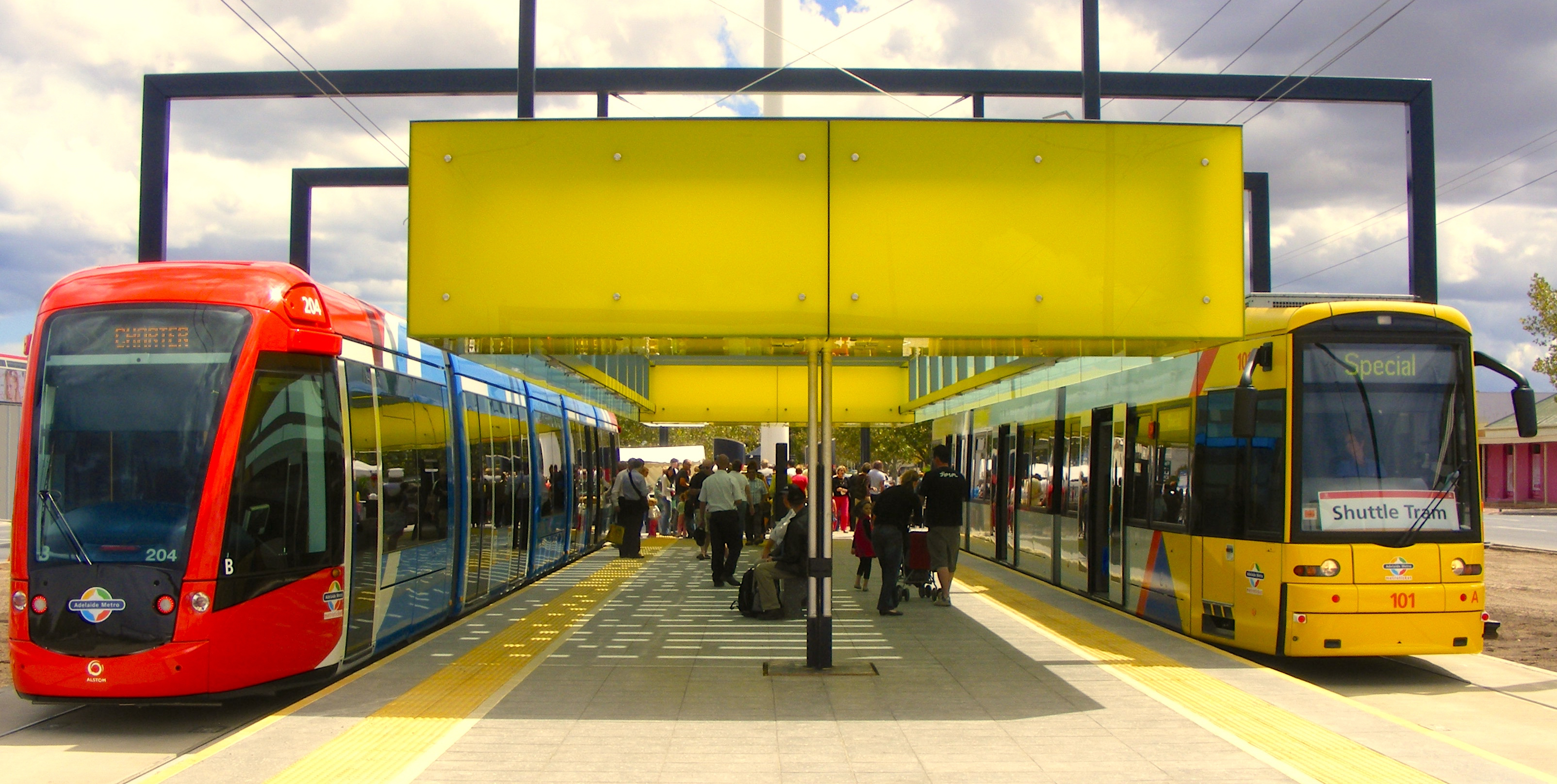
Tram stop outside the Entertainment Centre.

Port Road is the main arterial road connecting the suburb to the Adelaide city centre, while South Road forms its western boundary.

Hindmarsh is serviced by public transport run by the Adelaide Metro:

- The Grange and Outer Harbor railway lines pass beside the suburb. The closest station is Bowden.
- Adelaide Metro operates a tram service to the Entertainment Centre, which is free from anywhere in the city centre.
- The suburb is serviced by several bus routes.

== See also ==
- List of Adelaide suburbs
