= Bowden development =

South Australian urban development

Bowden Redevelopment
- Interactive map of Bowden Redevelopment
- Coordinates: 34°54′07″S 138°34′55″E
- Website: https://renewalsa.sa.gov.au/projects/bowden/

Companies
- Developer: Renewal SA

Technical details
- Buildings: 2,400

The Bowden development is an urban development in the Australian state of South Australia on a site formerly owned by the Clipsal corporation in the suburb of Bowden, within the City of Charles Sturt, in the Adelaide metropolitan area 2 kilometres from the city centre.

The site covers an area of 10.25 hectares (25.3 acres) and is bounded by Park Terrace to the south, the Outer Harbor railway line to the west, Drayton Street to the north and Sixth and Seventh Streets to the east. The Government also acquired the adjoining 5.9-hectare site which had been owned by Origin Energy (known as the Brompton Gasworks site). Currently the overall Bowden development site is 16.3 hectares.

The development is expected to be completed between 2020 and 2025. The development is expected to increase the population of Bowden, which was 648 in the 2006 census, to 3,500.

== Sustainability initiatives ==
The Bowden development is leading the way with many groundbreaking initiatives including energy reduction through passive and active measures for buildings. Green Star is a world's best practice rating tool from the Green Building Council of Australia covering a broad range of well-tested sustainability issues. Each and every building delivered in the development must achieve a minimum 5-star Green Star rating including commercial buildings such as Plant 4 Bowden.

In 2016, the Bowden development raised the bar and achieved its 6 Star Green Star - Communities accreditation; and with the highest concentration of Green Star homes in Australia, it is one of the most environmentally sustainable communities in the nation. Later in the same year, the Prince's Terraces Adelaide in Bowden became the first residential project to receive 6 Star Green Star design rating from the Green Building Council of Australia, encapsulating innovation and world leadership in sustainable design.

== History ==
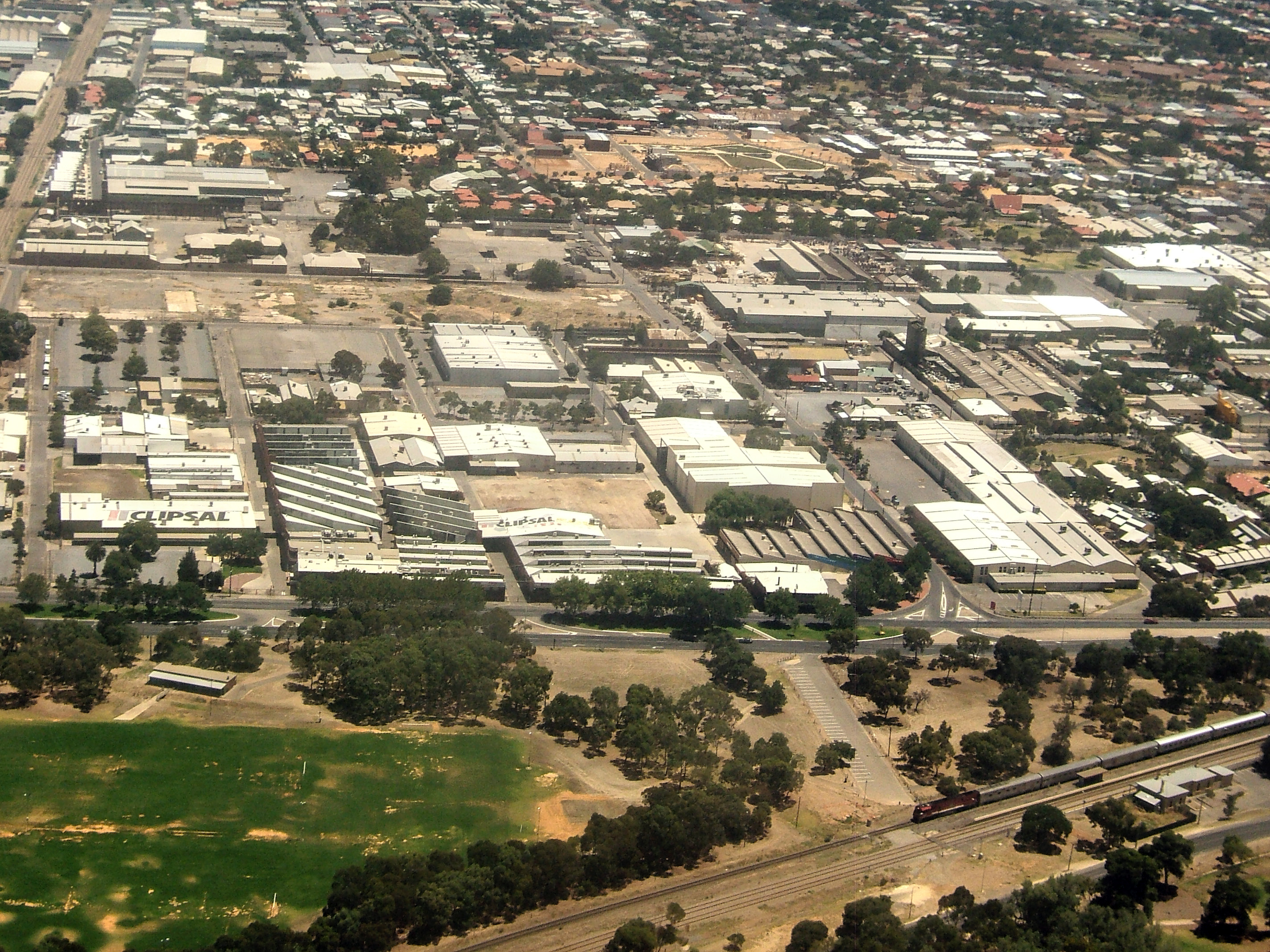
The Clipsal factory in Bowden in the foreground

The Bowden site was occupied by Clipsal, a company manufacturing conduit and electrical accessories, in 1936. The opportunity for an urban development on the site grew out of the South Australian Government's plans for eleven transport-oriented developments in the Adelaide metropolitan area, combined with Clipsal's decision that the Bowden site is surplus to company requirements and plan to vacate. The site was originally offered for sale in early 2008 with offers to be received by July 2008. Offers of 75-80 million Australian dollars were expected but not attained due to the 2008 financial crisis. The South Australian government announced in October 2008 that it would purchase the site. It was revealed in November 2008 the government had agreed to pay A$52.5 million.

== Timeline ==
=== 2008–2010 ===
In late 2008, the State Government acquired a 10.25ha parcel of land owned by Gerard Industries (known as the Clipsal site). In early 2010, the government acquired the adjoining 5.9ha site owned by Origin Energy (known as the Brompton Gasworks site).

Both sites are located within the City of Charles Sturt and are directly adjacent to the Adelaide parklands. The aim is to transform the combined sites into an inner-city, higher intensity, mixed use urban village. The final vision developed collaboratively with the community and stakeholders states: “Bowden Urban Village is a creative and diverse community, living and working in a high density sustainable urban environment. Its character, parklands connections and integrated urban design will offer a new and distinctive place in Adelaide for residents and visitors.”

The South Australian Government anticipates that the site will be used to develop more than 2,400 residential apartments and terrace homes, in addition to retail outlets and commercial offices around a town centre. The South Australian Government is promoting the plan as an economically, socially and environmentally sustainable development. Bowden is served by Bowden railway station, North Adelaide railway station, buses on Hawker Street and Port Road, and the tram from the nearby Adelaide Entertainment Centre on Port Road, Hindmarsh.

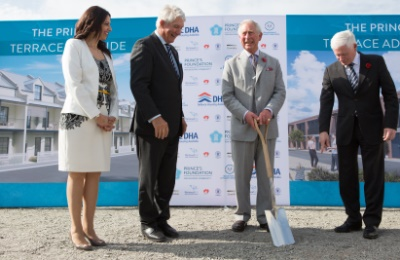
Prince Charles launched the Prince's Terraces in Bowden

=== 2011–2015 ===
In April 2011, the plans for the development were approved and an information and sales centre opened in March 2012.

Following demolition, site cleanup, surveying, planning and approval, remediation and development are underway. Bowden’s first pedestrian and bicycle-friendly streets — Fifth, Sixth, Seventh and part of Gibson Streets — opened to the public in May 2013.

In 2014, the restaurant Jarmer's Kitchen opened, and the Bowden development's first residents moved in.

In 2015, His Royal Highness Prince Charles, Prince of Wales officially launched the construction of Australia's first 6 Star Green Star residential project, the Prince's Terraces Adelaide which is predicted to use 50% less energy and 50% less potable water than a typical urban townhouse, with a carbon footprint also reduced by more than 40% when compared to a standard house.

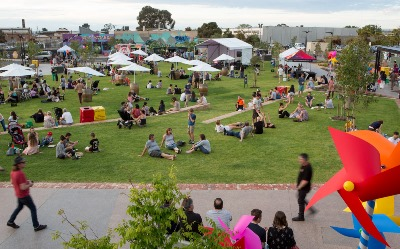
Bowden Town Square opening community celebration

=== 2016-2017 ===
The community celebrated the completion of a major upgrade to the Adelaide Park Lands across the road from Bowden in February 2016 where the Park Terrace Community Garden currently resides.

The Bowden development achieved its sustainability milestone with a 6 Star Green Star - Communities rating in October 2016, and hosted its biggest celebration ever to mark the opening of Bowden Town Square consisting of Bowden Park, the Plant 4 Bowden retail hub, and Plant 3 community hub.

In early 2017, 500 new homes were sold.
