= Ridleyton, South Australia =

Ridleyton
- Suburb
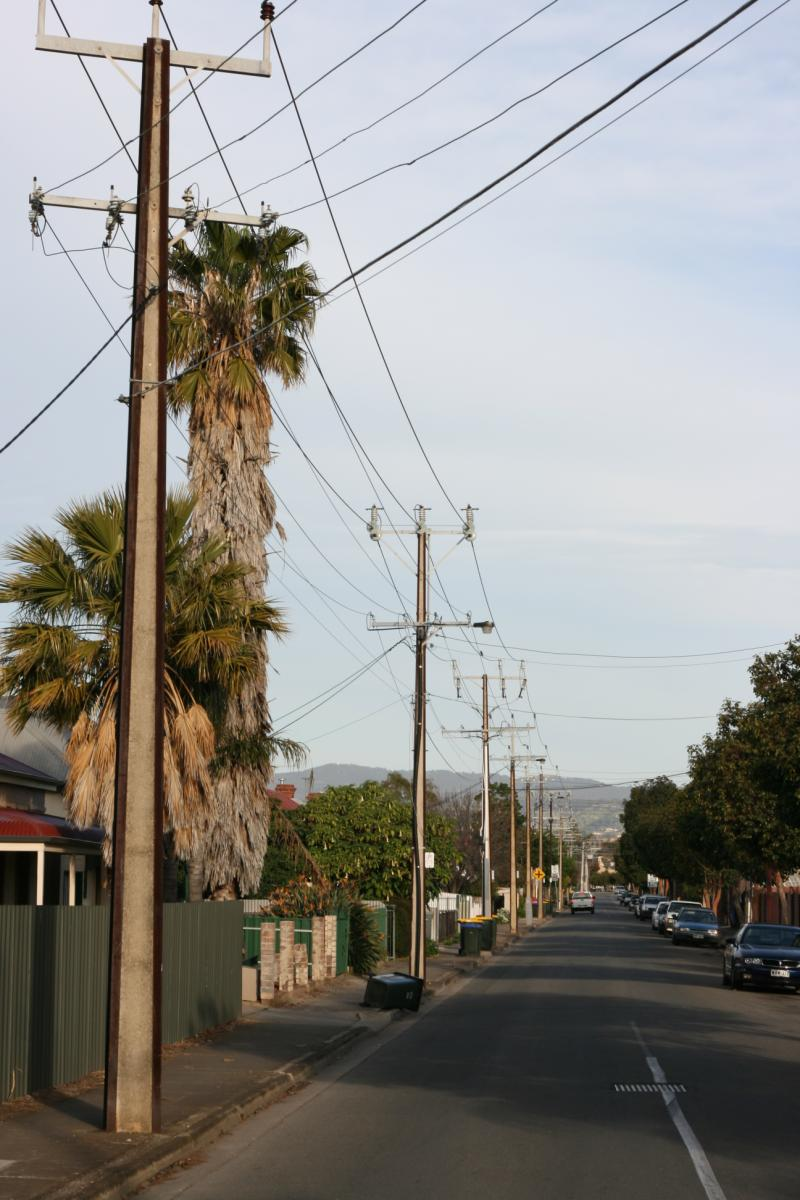
- Street view in Ridleyton

- Country: Australia
- State: South Australia
- City: Adelaide
- LGA: City of Charles Sturt
- Location: 4.3 km (2.7 mi) NW of Adelaide city centre
- Established: 1873

Government
  - State electorate: Croydon (2011)
  - Federal division: Adelaide (2019)

Area
  - Total: 0.4 km^{2} (0.15 sq mi)

Population
  - Total: 1,180 (SAL 2021)
- Postcode: 5008
Suburbs around Ridleyton
Croydon	Renown Park	Renown Park
Croydon	Ridleyton	Brompton
Croydon	Hindmarsh	Brompton

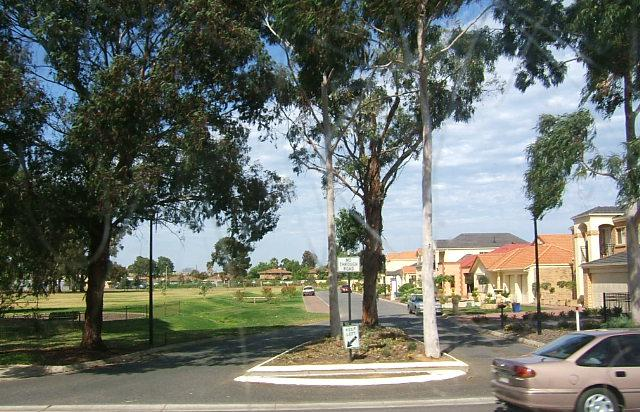
Greenshields Reserve in Ridleyton

Ridleyton is an inner northern suburb of Adelaide, South Australia. It is located in the City of Charles Sturt.

== History ==
The area incorporating the current suburb of Ridleyton was originally granted to Osmond Gilles in March 1839. He later transferred it to John Ridley, inventor of the stripper or reaping machine, in June 1842 for £275. In 1873, Ridley lodged a plan to subdivide his land, naming one part Ridleyton.

== Geography ==
Ridleyton is primarily bounded by South Road, Torrens Road, Wood Avenue and Blight Street. The suburb includes the northwestern end of the redeveloped Hawker Street precinct.

== Demographics ==
The 2016 Census by the Australian Bureau of Statistics counted 1,128 persons in Ridleyton on census night. Of these, 47.7% were male and 52.3% were female.

The majority of residents (64.9%) are of Australian birth, with other common census responses being China (6.0%), Vietnam (3.4%), England (2.6%), India (1.7%), and Greece (1.5). Additionally, people of Aboriginal and/or Torres Strait Islander descent made up 1.7% of the suburb

In terms of religious affiliation, 37.9% of residents attributed themselves to being irreligious, 17.7% attributed themselves to being Catholic, 8.2% attributed themselves to be Eastern Orthodox, and 5.4% attributed themselves to being Anglican. Within Ridleyton, 93.8% of the residents were employed, with the remaining 6.2% being unemployed.

== Politics ==
=== Local government ===
Ridleyton is part of Hindmarsh Ward in the City of Charles Sturt local government area, being represented in that council by Paul Alexandrides and Alice Campbell.

=== State and federal ===
Ridleyton lies in the state electoral district of Croydon and the federal electoral division of Adelaide. The suburb is represented in the South Australian House of Assembly by Peter Malinauskas and federally by Steve Georganas.

== Community ==
The local newspaper was the Weekly Times Messenger.

== Facilities and attractions ==
=== Shopping and dining ===
The Ridleyton Central Shopping Centre services Ridleyton and neighbouring suburbs. The centre is accessible from both Hawker Street and South Road. As well as such stores as a pharmacy and bakery, the centre includes a Romeo's Foodland supermarket.

The Hawker Street (Bowden & Brompton) and Elizabeth Street (Croydon) shopping and dining precincts are within walking distance of Ridleyton.

=== Parks ===
The largest park in Ridleyton is Albert Greenshields Reserve on Torrens Road. This park includes a Girl Guide hall, barbecue area, public restrooms, creek, playing field and a children's playground. There are laneways both to Wright Street and Blight Street.

There are also small parks on Ryan Place, as well as Hythe reserve on the corner of Hythe Street and Wood Avenue.

== Transportation ==
=== Roads ===
Ridleyton lies beside the intersection of South Road and Torrens Road, and is thus serviced by both. Hawker Street cuts through the centre of the suburb.

Many of the local streets were established in the 19th century. Consequently, roadways tend to be narrow and, with a small volume of traffic, quiet.

=== Public transport ===
Ridleyton is serviced by public transport run by the Adelaide Metro.

==== Trains ====
There is no train stop in Ridleyton itself. However, the following train services run nearby.

- Grange and Outer Harbor railway lines. The closest station is Croydon.
- Gawler line. The closest station is Ovingham.

==== Buses ====
The suburb is serviced by the following bus routes:

- 250, 251, 252
- 253, 254, N254

== See also ==
- List of Adelaide suburbs
