= Brooker & Sons =

Brooker & Sons were manufacturers of jams and conserves in Croydon, South Australia (Adelaide).

== History ==
Brooker & Sons grew out of a business founded by John Brooker (10 September 1861 – 1 March 1947), third son of London bricklayer and elder of the Church of Christ, William Brooker (26 August 1826 – 24 January 1909), who with his family emigrated to South Australia aboard Caroline arriving in April 1855.

Not to be confused with Stepney businessman William Brooker (c. 1820 – 9 November 1904), who arrived with his wife and family aboard Louisa Bailey in 1849. His son, also named William Brooker (c. 1847 – 20 June 1935) of Semaphore and Woodville, was a partner with John Carr, William Crooks, and John Burton in the firm of Crooks, Burton, & Co., which in May 1881 became Crooks & Brooker, furnishers and ironmongers. The company had a shop in Rundle Street and extensive warehouses in Port Adelaide, one of which was destroyed by fire in December 1885. Son William Charles Brooker (1874–1947), succeeded A. E. Illingworth as federal president of the Churches of Christ during the First World War. The company later had a chain of stores in Western Australia. In 1899 Brooker left the partnership, which by 1899 consisted of Brooker, James Edelsten McDonald, William Arthur McDonald, and George McArthur Scales.

John Brooker (1861–1947), his second son, was a market gardener and greengrocer in Croydon. In 1904, at a time of surplus in the supply of apricots, he began making jam in a copper in a shed at the rear of his premises. By 1908 the business had grown sufficiently to have its canned jams advertised for sale by Foy & Gibson, a major Rundle Street department store.

The firm had a display at the 1930 Adelaide Exhibition, and made a feature of their newly released bottled grape juice, touted as a "blood purifier".

John's older brother William Brooker (1848–1931), who for 25 years had a coach-building business in York (now Beverley, South Australia), joined the company around this time. He was from the age of twelve associated with the Church of Christ in Robert Street, Croydon, later becoming Sunday school superintendent, then was a foundation member of the Church of Christ at York.

In 1945 they opened a new modern factory on Queen Street, Croydon, between Princes Street and the Port Road, diagonally opposite their cold store. Products included cans of "Croydon" brand jams, preserved fruits, carrots, beetroot, and asparagus; jars of pickles, and bottles of cordials, sauces, and vinegar.

By 1947, when founder John Brooker died, the firm had 200 employees and the two-storey factory covered more than 2 acres (0.81 ha) of ground, and preparations were underway for a new factory at Finsbury (now Woodville North).

In 1951 Brooker & Sons and Mumzone Products (previously SA Fruitgrowers' Co-op. Society) amalgamated, and progressively moved their production lines to the new Woodville North factory. The Croydon factory became a warehouse for Godfreys Ltd., a whitegoods retailer.

One of the last of the family to be involved with the firm, John Brooker (1931– ), was a competitor in the 6,500 miles (10,500 km) 1953 Redex Reliability Trial, as co-driver of Les March's MG-TD sports car.

== Family ==
William Brooker (26 August 1826 – 24 January 1909) and his wife Jane Brooker née Gemmell (7 July 1925 – 29 March 1905) arrived board Caroline in March 1855.

- William Brooker J.P. (23 December 1848 – 10 November 1931) married Elizabeth Mary Brown ( – 1917) on 27 October 1870. He was coachbuilder for 25 years and with J. Brooker for 24 years. Retired hurt around 1922, and lived with his son. Actively involved with Church of Christ, Robert Street, Hindmarsh

- Rev. William Charles Brooker (1874 – 24 March 1947) married Emily Harding ( – 1959) in 1896. He was coachbuilder then had furniture shop in Rundle Street; later pastor of Queenstown Church of Christ, and held numerous positions of authority in the church.

- May Gemmell Brooker (1897–) married James Morrison Hall on 1 October 1924
- William Rutland Brooker (27 November 1901 – 2001) married Miriam Ottaway (9 November 1902 – ??) on 12 May 1927, lived in Perth, Western Australia.
- Dorothy Harding Brooker (1907–) married Frank Ronald Broadbent in 1931

- Thomas Henry Brooker ( – 1927) married Emma Tume ( – 1920) on 6 March 1870. He was a greengrocer, councillor, then mayor with Hindmarsh council, later MHA.

- William Henry Brooker (1870–1962) married Nellie Inez Alvorado on 29 September 1897
- Elizabeth May Brooker (1872–) married William Lambert Glastonbury on 8 April 1892
- Hamilton Thompson Brooker (1878–1970) married Susannah Parsons ( – pre-1970) on 11 July 1912
- Daisy Gemmell Brooker (1882–) married Edward Charles William Falla Clarke on 8 December 1910
- Ella Myrtle Brooker (1883–) married Clarence Ferdinand Rainsford on 9 January 1907
- Ivy Muriel Brooker (1888–) married Charles Stuart Munro on 25 March 1909
- Doris Fern Brooker (1891–) married Alick David Wherry Lawrie on 15 March 1913

- Agnes Eliza Brooker (1856–1862)
- John Brooker (10 September 1861 – 1 March 1947) married Ellen Hephzibah Black ( – 1921), daughter of Caroline Black, later Kidner (died 28 August 1907) in 1882

- Sydney James Brooker (1882–1935) married Annie Jessie Harding ( – 1956) in 1906
- Edith Brooker (1884–) married Thomas Francis George Cooper in 1908
- Percival William Brooker (1885–1970) married Emma Amelia Dring ( – 1949) in 1908, lived at Mellor Park (now Semaphore Park)
- Arthur John Brooker (1887 – 25 April 1946) married Ina Pickering ( – 1962) in 1911. Manager of Brooker & Son, killed when car rolled.

- Ethel Merle Brooker (2 July 1912 – ) married Colin Dawson Crispe ( –1982) in 1937
- Joyce Margaret Brooker (15 November 1913 – 2007) married John Clifford Whitaker Marsh (1906–1985) in 1936
- Gordon Roy Brooker (16 February 1919 – 1944) RAAF observer, killed in World War II
- John Brooker (19 March 1931 – ) married Beryl Pearce ( – ) on 27 November 1954 Succeeded father as managing director Brooker & Sons

- Ethel Caroline Brooker (1889–) married Leslie James Weeks in 1913, lived in Croydon

- Mary Brooker (1867 – c. 18 January 1929) married James Walter Snook (1867–1952) in 1890

- Phillis Jane Snook (1893–) married Thomas Prideaux Richardson ( – ) in 1916, lived in Croydon
- Alice Gemmell Snook (1898–) married Gordon Pickering ( – ) in 1920, lived in Croydon
- Juanita Mary Snook (1903–) married William Gordon Graham ( – ) in 1927, lived in Fullarton
