= Electoral district of Croydon (South Australia) =

South Australian state electoral district

Croydon South Australia—House of Assembly
- Interactive map of electoral district boundaries from the 2022 state election (Note: The electorate will have no change in boundaries at the 2026 state election.)
- State: South Australia
- Created: 2002
- MP: Peter Malinauskas
- Party: Labor
- Namesake: Croydon
- Electors: 28,995 (2026)
- Area: 20.5 km^{2} (7.9 sq mi)
- Demographic: Metropolitan
- Coordinates: 34°52′43″S 138°33′40″E
Electorates around Croydon:
Port Adelaide	Port Adelaide	Port Adelaide
Cheltenham	Croydon	Enfield Adelaide
West Torrens	West Torrens	Adelaide

Croydon is a single-member electoral district for the South Australian House of Assembly. Named after the suburb of Croydon, it is a suburban electorate in Adelaide's inner north-west incorporating some light industry stretching north-west from the Adelaide Park Lands adjacent to North Adelaide as far as Grand Junction Road to the north. In addition to Croydon, it includes Angle Park, Athol Park, Bowden, Brompton, Croydon Park, Devon Park, Dudley Park, Ferryden Park, Kilkenny, Mansfield Park, Regency Park, Renown Park, Ridleyton, West Croydon, Woodville Gardens; and parts of Allenby Gardens, Welland, and West Hindmarsh.

== History ==
Croydon was created in the 1998 electoral distribution as a safe Labor seat, replacing the abolished Spence. It was first contested at the 2002 state election, when it was won by future Attorney-General and Speaker Michael Atkinson, who had been the member for Spence since 1989.

The seat is split between the marginal federal seats of Adelaide and Hindmarsh and the safe federal Labor seat of Port Adelaide. Following the 2014 election Croydon became Labor's safest seat, on an 18.9 percent margin. Counting its time as Spence, it has been in Labor hands since its creation in 1970.

The 2016 redistribution saw the northern boundary of Croydon district extended northwards from the vicinity of Regency Road to Grand Junction Road. The southwestern boundary also changed, with Beverley, Woodville Park, Hindmarsh and Flinders Park being absorbed by the neighbouring districts of Cheltenham and West Torrens.

In February 2017, Atkinson announced his intention not to re-contest the seat at the 2018 election. Upper house MP Peter Malinauskas succeeded him at the 2018 election.

The 2020 redistribution added Kilburn and the north-west quarter of Prospect from neighboring Enfield. The parts of Allenby Gardens, Welland and West Hindmarsh were removed from and added to the electorate of West Torrens.

== Members for Croydon ==
Member	Party	Term
Michael Atkinson	Labor	2002–2018
Peter Malinauskas	Labor	2018–present

== Election results ==
2026 South Australian state election: Croydon
Party	Candidate	Votes	%	±%
Labor	Peter Malinauskas	12,774	55.4	−5.4
One Nation	Dale Blackeby	2,934	12.7	+12.7
Greens	Ruby Dolling	2,686	11.6	−0.7
Liberal	Michael Santagata	1,797	7.8	−14.7
Independent Socialist	Ahmed Azhar	1,308	5.7	+5.7
Family First	Hieu Pham	1,017	4.4	+4.4
Animal Justice	Suzanne Pope	334	1.4	−3.0
Australian Family	Joey Elms	122	0.5	+0.5
United Voice	Daniel Bettinelli	84	0.4	+0.4
Total formal votes		23,056	95.0	−1.6
Informal votes		1,208	5.0	+1.6
Turnout		24,264	83.7	−1.3
Two-party-preferred result
Labor	Peter Malinauskas	18,350	79.7	+4.9
One Nation	Dale Blackeby	4,688	20.3	+20.3
Two-candidate-preferred result
Labor	Peter Malinauskas	17,067	74.0	−0.7
Greens	Ruby Dolling	5,989	26.0	+26.0
Labor hold				
