= Bowden, South Australia =

Bowden
- Suburb
- A large mural on a converted warehouse in Bowden

- Country: Australia
- State: South Australia
- City: Adelaide
- LGA: City of Charles Sturt
- Location: 2 km (1.2 mi) NW of Adelaide city centre
- Established: 1839

Government
  - State electorate: Croydon (2011)
  - Federal division: Adelaide (2011)

Population
  - Total: 1,808 (SAL 2021)
- Postcode: 5007
Suburbs around Bowden
Brompton	Renown Park	Renown Park
Brompton	Bowden	Ovingham
Hindmarsh	Hindmarsh, North Adelaide	North Adelaide

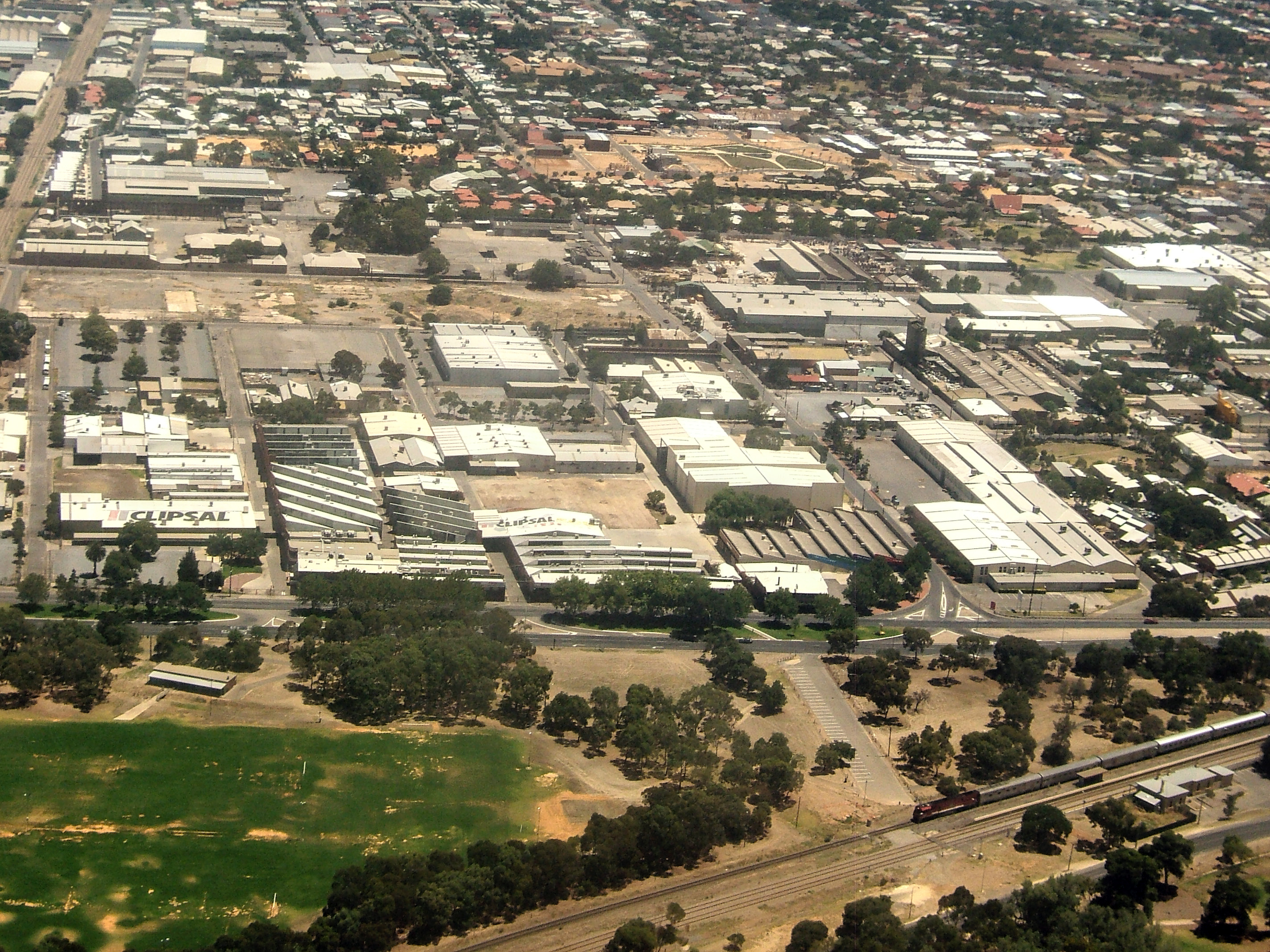
Aerial view of the Clipsal site development in Bowden.

Bowden (/ˈboʊdən/) is an inner northwestern suburb of Adelaide, South Australia. It is located in the City of Charles Sturt.

== History ==
The 'Village of Bowden' was established in 1839 by James Hurtle Fisher, who named it after his native village in Northamptonshire.

Bowden had a post office open from 1970 until 1991. Before 1970 the office in the area was named Ovingham; after 1991 the Brompton office has provided postal services.

In October 2008, Premier Mike Rann and Infrastructure Minister Patrick Conlon announced the purchase of the 10-hectare Clipsal factory site in Bowden to become a new "green village". They announced plans for up to 1,500 medium- and high-density Green Star residential apartments, with retail outlets and commercial offices set around a town centre, for the former industrial site. The $1 billion Bowden development was designed to be a "transport-oriented development"(TOD) as envisaged by The 30-Year Plan for Greater Adelaide. At the on-site announcement, Mr Rann said the development was expected to take 12 to 15 years to complete.

In 2010, the State Government purchased the adjacent Origin Energy site (formerly Brompton Gasworks).

Construction on the first stage and parks were officially opened in May 2013 by Premier Jay Weatherill. Construction commenced on first residential dwellings in 2013. First residents moved into their homes in 2014.

== Geography ==
The suburb is primarily bounded by the Grange/Outer Harbor railway line, the Gawler railway line and Park Terrace.

== Demographics ==
The 2006 Census by the Australian Bureau of Statistics counted 648 persons in Bowden on census night. Of these, 51.2% were male and 48.8% were female. Within ten years, the 2016 Census recorded 911 people in Bowden, with 52% being male and 48% being female, and further increased to 1,808 people in 2021, with 51.1% recorded as male and 48.9% as female.

The majority of residents (60.8%) are of Australian birth, with other common census responses being England (4.6%), China (4.1%), Malaysia (2.0%), and India (1.5%), New Zealand (1.3%). Additionally, people of Aboriginal and/or Torres Strait Islander descent made up 1.2% of the suburb.

In terms of religious affiliation, 58.2% of residents attributed themselves to being irreligious, 11.4% attributed themselves to being Catholic, 3.7% attributed themselves to be Anglican, and 2.9% attributed themselves to being Muslim.

== Politics ==
=== Local government ===
Bowden is part of Hindmarsh Ward in the City of Charles Sturt local government area, being represented in that council by Paul Alexandrides and Alice Campbell.

=== State and federal ===
Bowden lies in the state electoral district of Croydon and the federal electoral division of Adelaide. The suburb is represented in the South Australian House of Assembly by Peter Malinauskas and federally by Steve Georganas.

== Community ==
The local newspaper is the Weekly Times Messenger.

=== Community groups ===
Adelaide Bike Kitchen is a community-run group initially located on Gibson Street that teaches people to maintain or build their own bicycles and has workshop facilities and volunteer support available for the cycling public. The organisation also provides cheap vegan meals after workshop sessions and hosts occasional events in public space. In 2026 the organisation relocated within Bowden.

Uniting Care Wesley Bowden is charity that helps people and families, and is located at Gibson Street.

Activate is a local church based at the corner of Drayton Street and Hawker Street. The Welcome Centre is also at the same location.

The Bowden Brompton Community Centre is based at 19 Green Street, Brompton.

== Facilities and attractions ==
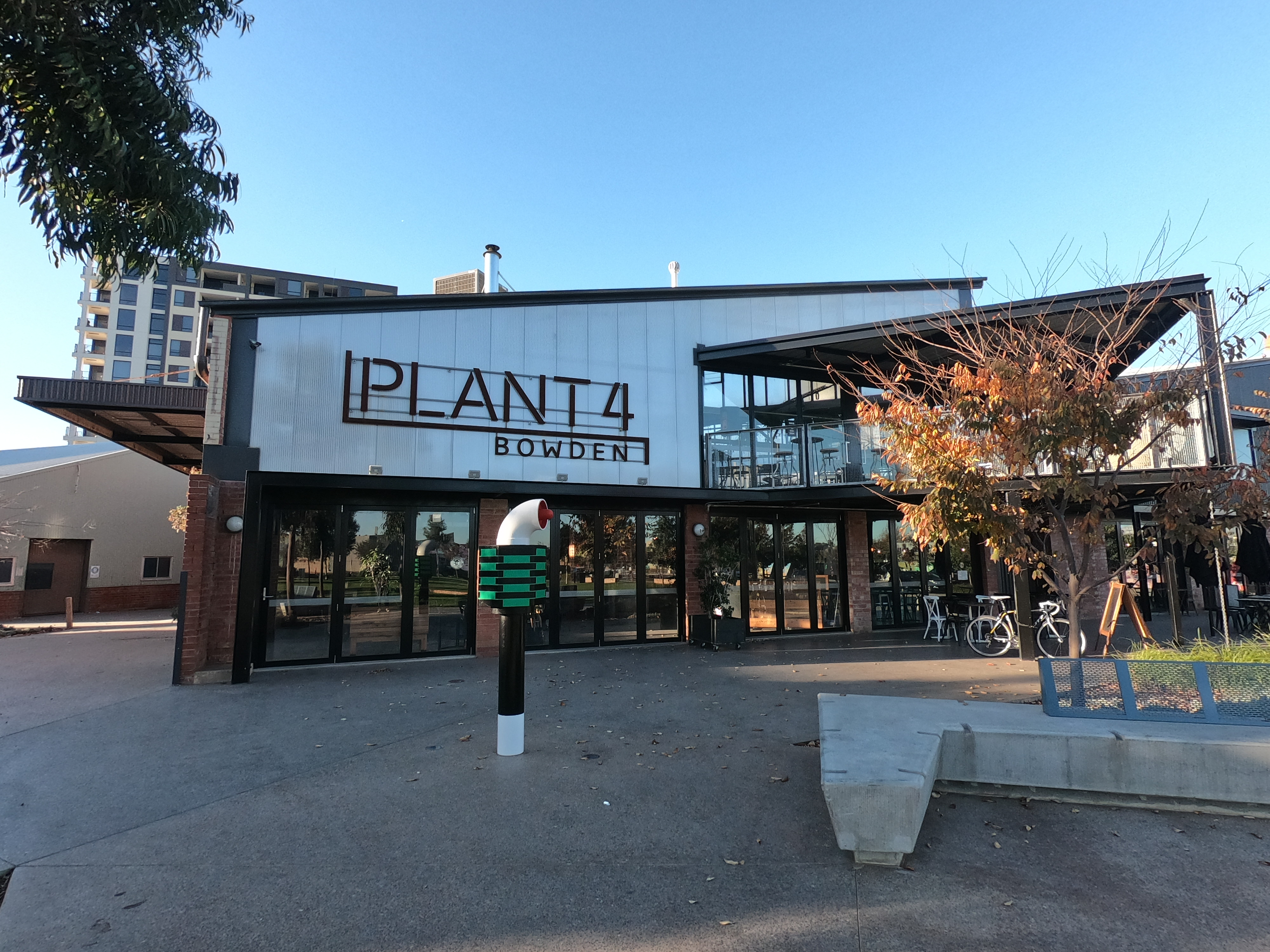
Plant 4 Bowden community and shopping centre

=== Parks ===
Bowden Park located in the Town Square on Gibson Street opened in October 2016.

Kevin Taylor Park, located between Fifth Street and Sixth Street, was built using recycled materials. It has a steel pavilion, barbeque facilities, table tennis table and a chess set. Kevin Taylor Park was named after the late Kevin Taylor, a respected landscape architect who also worked in urban design from Adelaide, South Australia.

Gibson Street Reserve, also known as Emu Park, was upgraded and re-opened on Friday, 11 April 2014.

Parfit Square is the largest park in Bowden.

== Transportation ==
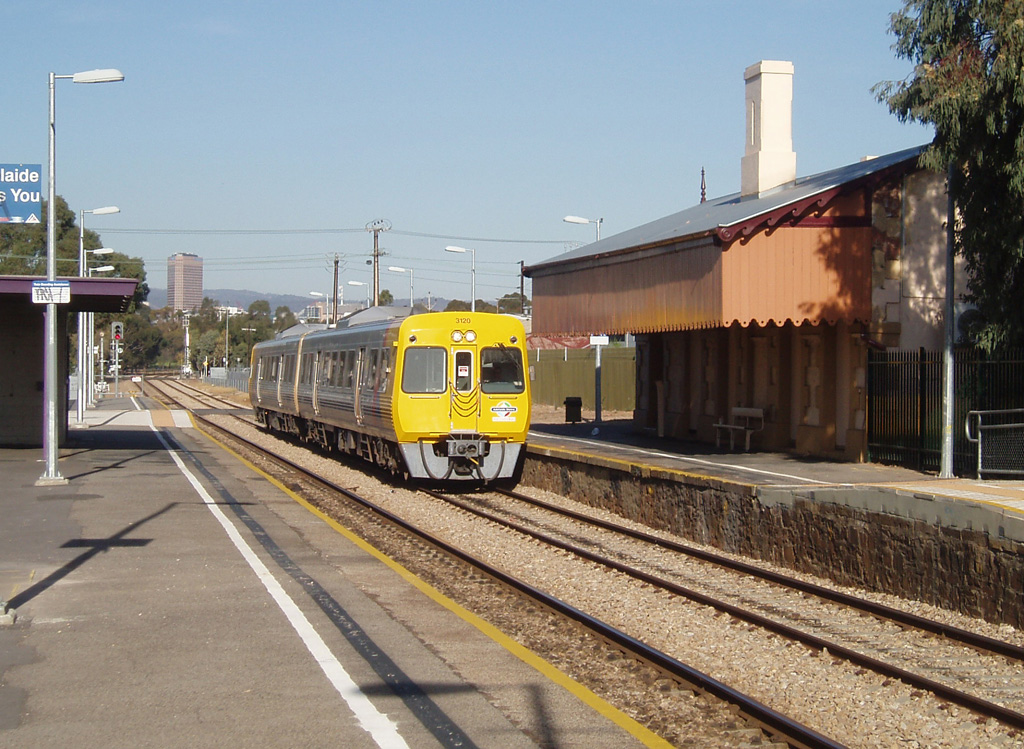
Bowden railway station

=== Roads ===
Bowden is serviced by Torrens Road, Park Terrace and Hawker Street.

Many of the local streets were established in the 19th century. Consequently, roadways tend to be narrow and quiet with a small volume of traffic.

Bowden's new streets are designed to be 'walkable' and shared by vehicles, bicycles and people. With the new development, the suburb has seen more pop-up street art and curbless, tree-lined streets furnished with street furniture on footpaths.

=== Public transport ===
Bowden is serviced by public transport run by the Adelaide Metro.

==== Tram ====
The tram line runs between the Adelaide Entertainment Centre to Glenelg with Park n Ride facilities available at the Entertainment Centre tram stop.

The tram runs for free when travelling between the Entertainment Centre stop and South Terrace stop in Adelaide's central business district.

==== Trains ====
The following train services run on the eastern and southern boundaries of the suburb.

- Grange and Outer Harbour railway lines. The closest station is Bowden.
- Gawler line. The closest station is Ovingham.

==== Buses ====
The suburb is serviced by the following bus routes:

- 250, 251, 252
- 253, 254, N254

== See also ==
- List of Adelaide suburbs
