= Croydon, South Australia =

Croydon
- Suburb
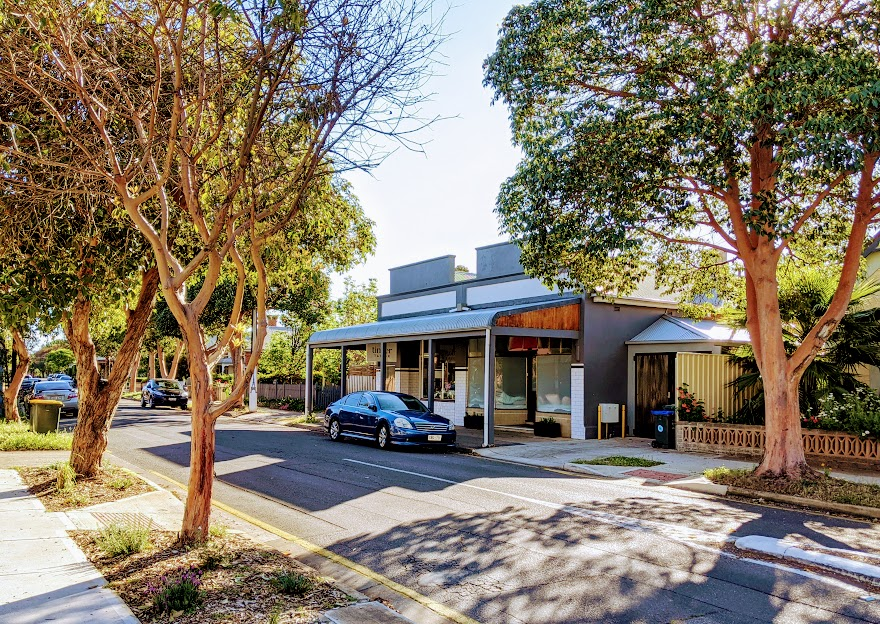
- Heritage Shops on Elizabeth Street

- Country: Australia
- State: South Australia
- City: Adelaide
- LGA: City of Charles Sturt
- Location: 4.5 km (2.8 mi) NW of Adelaide city centre
- Established: 1855

Government
  - State electorate: Croydon (2011)
  - Federal division: Adelaide

Population
  - Total: 1,220 (SAL 2021)
- Postcode: 5008
Suburbs around Croydon
West Croydon	Renown Park	Renown Park
West Croydon	Croydon	Ridleyton
West Hindmarsh	West Hindmarsh	Hindmarsh

Croydon is an inner north western suburb of Adelaide, South Australia. It is located in the City of Charles Sturt.

The area is named after Croydon in London.

== History ==
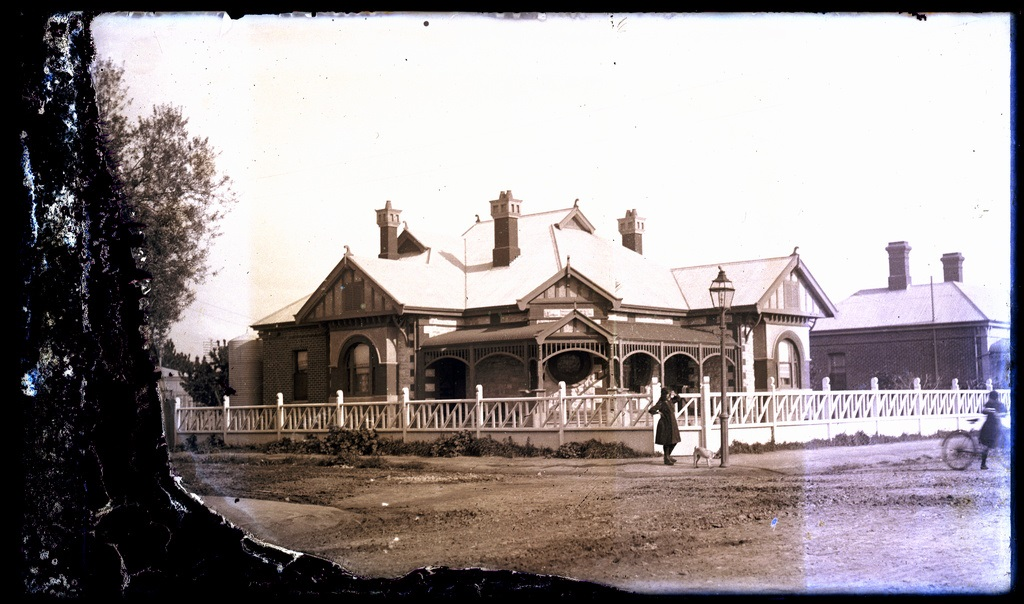
Brooker Residence, Queen St Croydon, approximately 1910

The land on which the suburb now stands was purchased in 1853 by Alfred Watts and Philip Levi. They laid out the Village of Croydon in 1855, comprising Croydon Farm of 40 acres (16 ha) and lots of up to 5 acres (2.0 ha). The village may have been named after Croydon, England, then a part of Surrey, Now a part of London, the same county in which Levi had been born. In 1904, market gardener and greengrocer John Brooker founded a jams and conserves business on Queen Street, producing "Croydon" branded products. The business prospered, leading to the construction of the Croydon Jam Factory on the corner of Queen Street and Princes Street in 1945. However production was soon moved to Woodville North in 1951. The Croydon factory became a warehouse for Godfreys Ltd., a whitegoods retailer.

One of Croydon's first farm barns, later converted into a home in the 1920s still exists far into a lot on Bedford Street, Croydon. This good example of a Brick and Stone building provide's a direct link to Croydon's history. This Original Barn, now renovated into a family home, is believed to have been built by Richard Day who developed the suburb over 100 years ago. Richard Day developed his own villa-style cottage on the site of 14 St Lawrence Ave in Croydon which could be reached via a long driveway from South Road. It was demolished circa 1970 at which point a retirement village was built in its place. At this time, Croydon was mainly farmland.

== Geography ==
Croydon is situated approximately 4.5 km (2.8 mi) north-west of Adelaide and 6.5 km (4.0 mi) directly east from the coast at Grange.

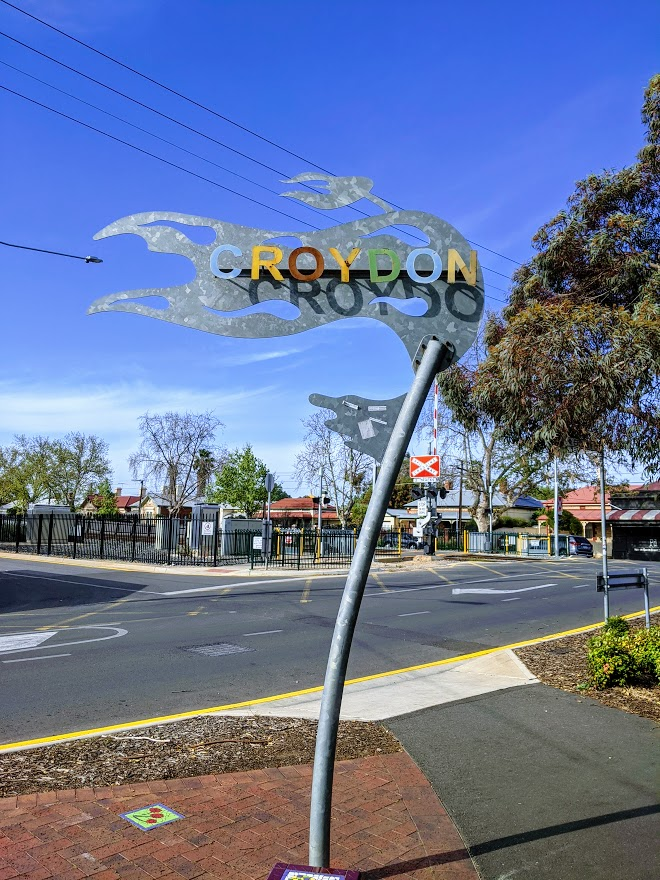
Croydon Sign in Elizabeth Street

== Demographics ==
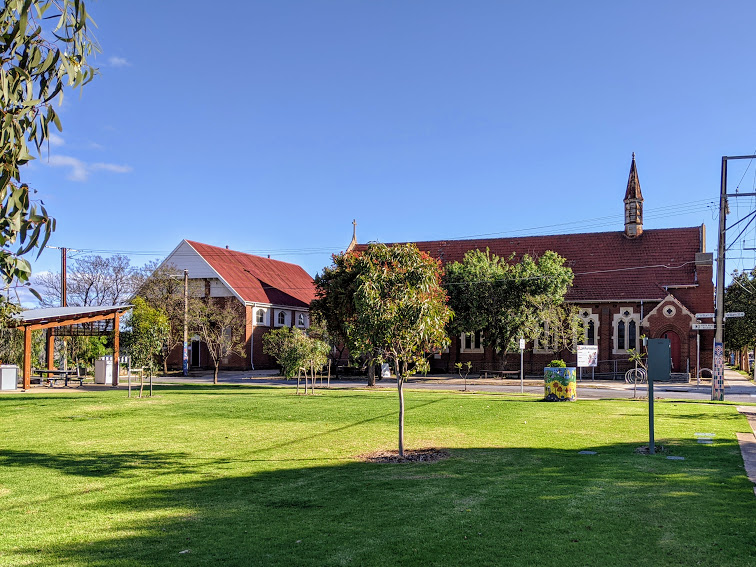
St Barnabas Church in Croydon

The 2021 Census by the Australian Bureau of Statistics counted 1,220 persons in Croydon on census night. Of these, 49.7% were male and 50.3% were female.

The majority of residents (72.5%) are of Australian birth, with other common census responses being Italy (4.3%), Greece (3.9%), England (3.0%), Vietnam (1.9%) and India (0.8%). Additionally, Aboriginals and/or Torres Strait Islanders contributed to 2.2% of the suburb's population.

The age distribution of Croydon residents is broadly similar to that of the greater Australian population. 72.7% of residents were over 25 years in 2021, compared to the Australian average of 69.9%; and 27.3% were younger than 25 years, compared to the Australian average of 30.1%.

In terms of religious affiliation, 40.2% of Croydon residents state that they were irreligious in 2021 (up from 33.7% in 2016), 25.2% stated that they were Catholic, 13.3% stated they were Eastern Orthodox, and 3.4% attributed themselves to being Anglican. Within Croydon, 91.3% of the residents aged > 15 years who reported being in the labour force were employed, with 3.6% being unemployed and 4.9% away from work.

== Politics ==
=== Local government ===
Croydon is part of Hindmarsh Ward in the City of Charles Sturt local government area, being represented in that council by Councillors Katriona Kinsella and Alice Campbell.

=== State and federal ===
Croydon lies in the state electoral district of Croydon and the federal electoral division of Adelaide. The suburb is represented in the South Australian House of Assembly by the Premier of South Australia, Labor member Peter Malinauskas and federally by Steve Georganas.

== Facilities and attractions ==
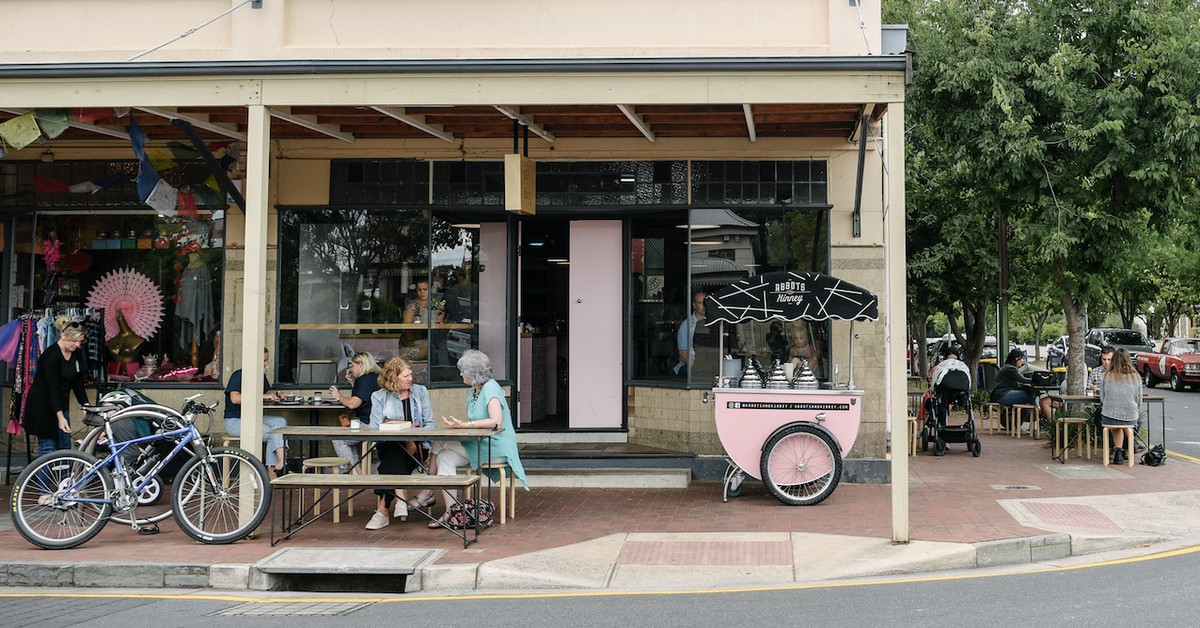
Bakery on Elizabeth Street, Croydon

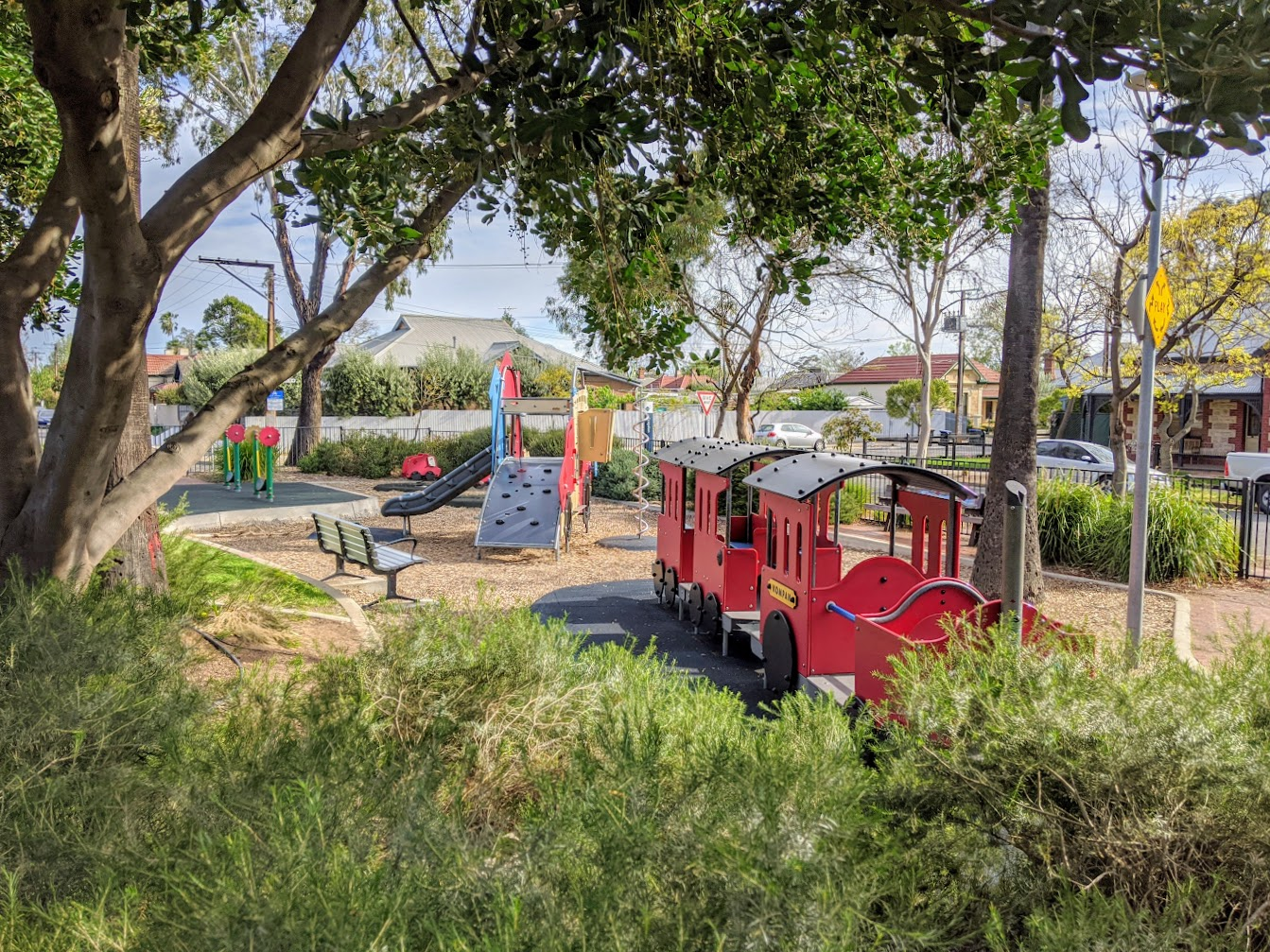
Train Park at Croydon, Adelaide

=== Parks ===
Two parks are located on Day Terrace beside Croydon railway station. These two parks are known as Croydon Train park and Croydon playground reserve.

=== Queen Street Music Festival ===
A free street music festival has previously been held on Elizabeth Street, supported by the Charles Sturt Council. This was last held on Friday 6 April 2019, hosted the local bands Dead Roo, Last Days of Kali, Rex Wonderful & the Silk Sheets, Blush response and David Blumberg & the Maraby Band.

== Transportation ==
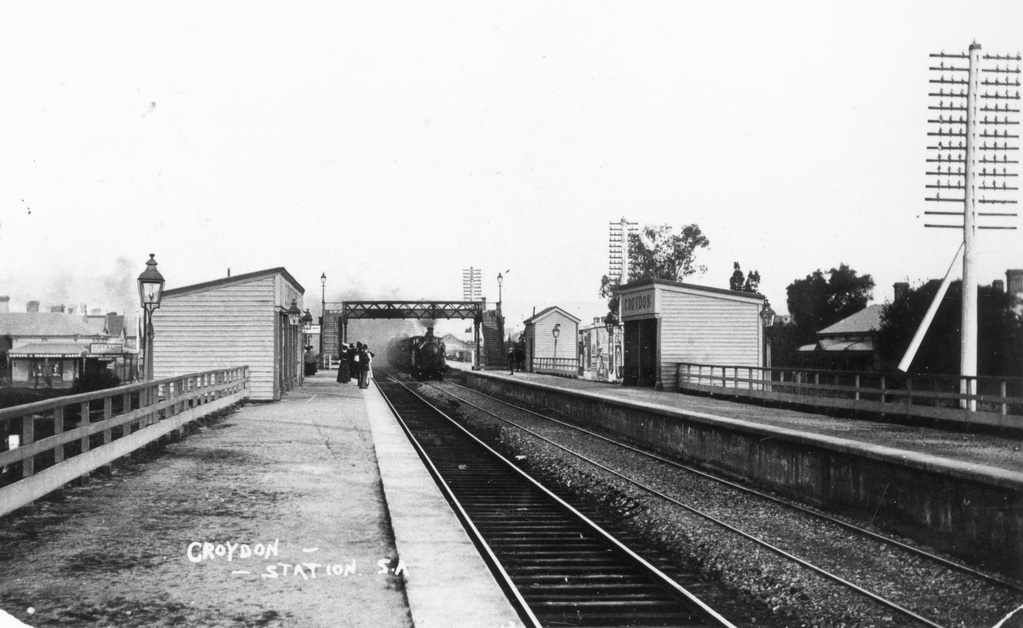
Croydon Train Station in 1915

=== Roads ===
Croydon is bounded by Torrens Road to the north, South Road, to the east and Port Road to the south.

Day Terrace in Croydon, which runs parallel to the Outer Harbor/Grange Train Line is part of the Outer Harbor Greenway, a bicycle route, which provides a family-friendly bicycle path from the City of Adelaide to Outer Harbor via Port Adelaide.

=== Public transport ===
Croydon is well serviced by public transport run by Adelaide Metro.

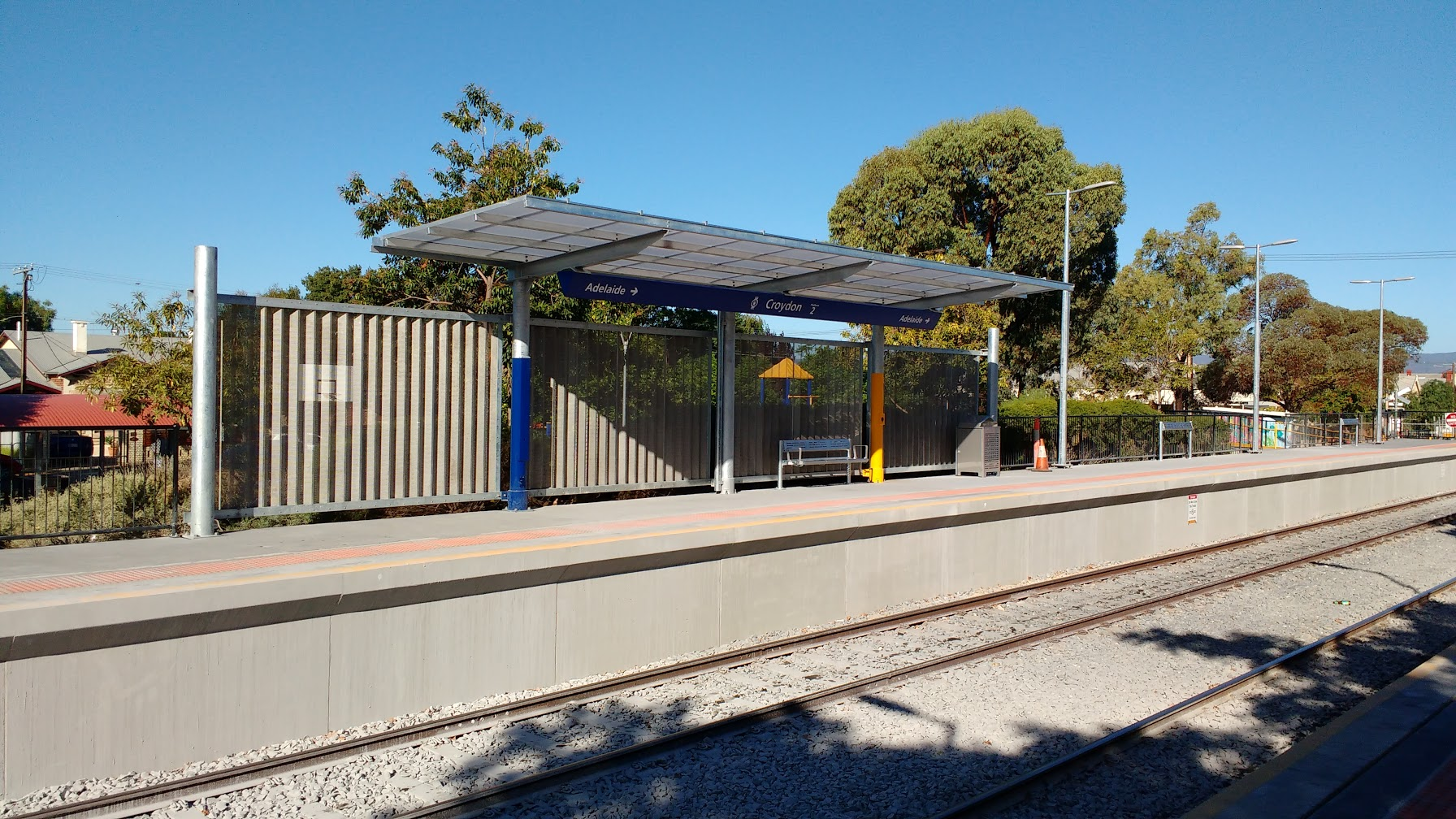
Croydon Train Station in 2019

==== Trains ====
The Grange and Outer Harbor railway lines pass through the suburb. The closest station is Croydon.

==== Buses ====
The suburb is serviced by buses run by Adelaide Metro.

== See also ==
- List of Adelaide suburbs
