= Brompton, South Australia =

Brompton
- Suburb
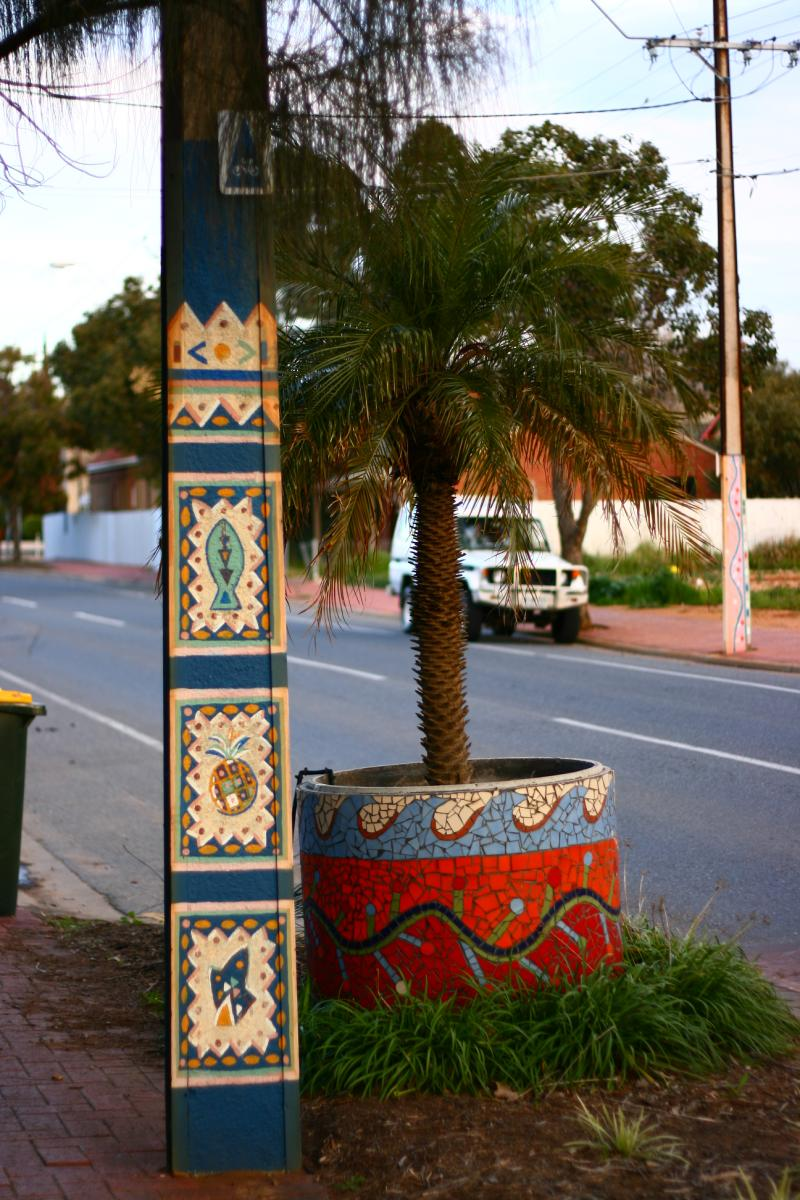
- Stobie pole in Brompton

- Coordinates: 34°53′49.2″S 138°34′37.2″E
- Country: Australia
- State: South Australia
- City: Adelaide
- LGA: City of Charles Sturt
- Location: 3.8 km (2.4 mi) NW of Adelaide city centre
- Established: 1849

Government
  - State electorate: Croydon (2011)
  - Federal division: Adelaide (2011)

Population
  - Total: 3,729 (SAL 2021)
- Postcode: 5007
Suburbs around Brompton
Ridleyton	Renown Park	Renown Park
Ridleyton	Brompton	Bowden
Hindmarsh	Hindmarsh	Bowden

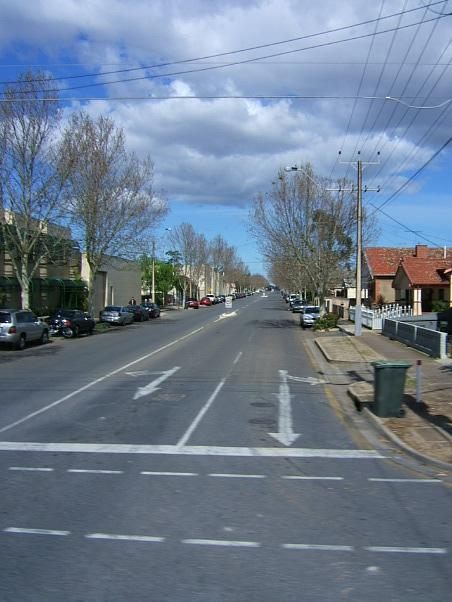
Chief Street, Brompton

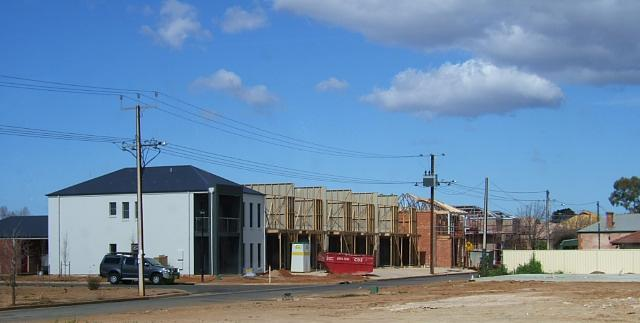
Housing development in Brompton

Brompton is an inner-northern suburb of Adelaide, South Australia in the City of Charles Sturt.

== History ==
Brompton is on the land of the Kaurna People, an area that stretches from Port Broughton to Cape Jervis. Prior to the colonisation of South Australia in 1836, the Kaurna people managed and lived off the land and waterways of the region.

=== Early colonisation - 1940's ===
Neighbouring the areas that became the villages of Bowden and Brompton, "Hindmarsh Town" was established in 1838 as South Australia's first secondary town outside of Adelaide. This was criticised for 'disfiguring' Wakefield's theory of 'concentrated settlement' by creating a population centre outside the city Adelaide. Moreover, Hindmarsh Town was intended to be an independent working class town, managed by a committee of management consisting of skilled workers and lower middle class settlers.

Bowden was established as a neighbouring village to Hindmarsh Town in 1839. Brompton was established ten years later, in June 1849, when William Sanders and William Paxton subdivided section 355 of the Hundred of Yatala. The name Brompton comes from Yorkshire, England where Willam Paxton was born.

The Bowden and Brompton villages had notably narrower streets and smaller allotments compared to Hindmarsh, particularly in Bowden. Both new villages were populated by working class settlers, due to the small parcels of land and nearby industries.

Within the first six months of the establishment of Brompton, two-thirds of its previously "bare common ground" was "covered with substantial and genteel cottages, thriving shops and wells of excellent water." Large numbers of pigs and goats roamed the streets, and produce was grown to supplement the working wages.

=== 1850s - 1890s ===
In the 1850s the three villages of Bowden, Brompton and Hindmarsh became the centres of population, commerce and industry of the Hindmarsh district. Land ownership was concentrated to a small number of individuals who also dominated the economic, civic and social affairs of the area. This group of "local establishment" further profited from subdividing allotments and building cottages for rental by labourers and poor people.

Brickmaking was a common industry in Brompton, due to an abundance of clay in the area and water available from the River Torrens. The Hocking Brothers established a brickfield on about three acres of land in Brompton in the mid-1850s, and by 1869 the site employed seven men and produced about 13,000 bricks a week.

To meet the heating and lighting needs of the emerging colony of South Australia, the SA Gas Company established the Brompton Gassworks, on Chief Street, Brompton. The glasswork started operating in 1863 by burning black coal in furnaces to produce coal gas. By-products were tar, weed poison and coke. This has been described as "the first major step in converting a semi-rural village into a manufacturing township". The site became a significant employer of local residents over the next 140 years, dominating the landscape with its high chimneys and enormous stone and brick structure. According to Heritage Investigations for the Town of Hindmarsh and South Australian Government, the gassworks site "remains the single most important historical industrial complex in Hindmarsh, one of the most important in South Australia, and certainly the State's most spectacular relic of a large, early public utility."

At the time, some people considered coal burning as providing health benefits. People would bring their asthmatic children to the gasworks and walk them around, believing that the burning of coal cleared the air.

By 1865, the number of houses in Brompton had remained at about 70, however there were now eight shops, 11 brickyards, a chapel, and the glassworks.

In 1875, "Paddy" Coglin subdivided land which became Brompton Park (now part of Brompton) and Ridleyton North, from an extensive block of land that he purchased on Coglin Street. The subdivision was intended to house the 'late arrivals from England' and for what Coglin described as access to the 'inexhaustible stores of incomparable brick-clay'. The small size of the residential divisions were condemned as 'pocket-handkerchief allotments', and many backyards were below street level with no drainage. When it rained, muddy streets were washed in with household refuse, creating stagnant pools in backyards. This contributed to the deaths of many children from typhoid. In the early years, there was also no water supply to Brompton Park, and residents had to walk to the Bowden railway station to collect water, which was only available for one hour in the morning and one hour in the afternoon, restricting availability for working people.

Ovingham Post Office opened on 1 November 1879, was renamed Bowden in 1970 and Brompton in 1991.

An economic boom in the late 1870s expanded the brickyards in the Brompton area, and in 1882 the Metropolitan Brick Company was formed. The company acquired 28 acres of land at Brompton Park to obtain clay and produce bricks. In 1884, the Hoffman kiln was built on Hawker Street, Brompton, which allowed for continuous firing, wasting less fuel and recycling of waste heat. The kiln held 16 chambers and had a capacity for firing 320,000 bricks a day. In 1883, Brompton was known as the area where the brick carriers congregated.

The brickmakers were adverse to fencing the pug holes leftover from brick-making industry, which created a safety hazard for local people, especially in winter when they became lakes.

== Geography ==
The suburb lies between Torrens Road and the Grange/Outer Harbor railway line and is bordered by Torrens Road at its northern end.

== Demographics ==
The 2021 Census by the Australian Bureau of Statistics counted 3,729 persons in Brompton on census night. Of these, 47.9% were male and 52.1% were female.

The majority of residents (62.7%) are of Australian birth, with other common census responses being Greece (4.0%), England (3.9%), Vietnam (2.3%), China (2.1%), and India (1.9%). Additionally, people of Aboriginal and/or Torres Strait Islander descent made up 1.8% of the suburb

In terms of religious affiliation, 49.3% of residents attributed themselves to being irreligious, 14.6% attributed themselves to being Catholic, 7.4% attributed themselves to be Eastern Orthodox, and 4.1% attributed themselves to being Anglican. Within Brompton, 94.6% of the residents were employed, with the remaining 5.4% being unemployed.

== Politics ==
=== Local government ===
Brompton is part of Hindmarsh Ward in the City of Charles Sturt local government area, being represented in that council by members Alice Campbell and Katriona Kinsella.

=== State and federal ===
Brompton lies in the state electoral district of Croydon and the federal electoral division of Adelaide. The suburb is represented in the South Australian House of Assembly by Peter Malinauskas and federally by Steve Georganas.

== Community ==
The local newspaper is the Weekly Times Messenger.

=== Community groups ===
The Bowden Brompton Community Centre is based at 19 Green Street, Brompton. It was established in 1972 by a community group for residents to address community and housing issues. Additionally, Brompton also contains the Adelaide Croatian Club and the Czechoslovak Club.

=== Schools ===
Bowden Brompton Community School is located on Torrens Road and Immaculate Heart of Mary School is located on East Street.

== Facilities and attractions ==
=== Shopping and dining ===
The Brickmakers Arms and the Excelsior Hotel are in the suburb.

=== Parks ===
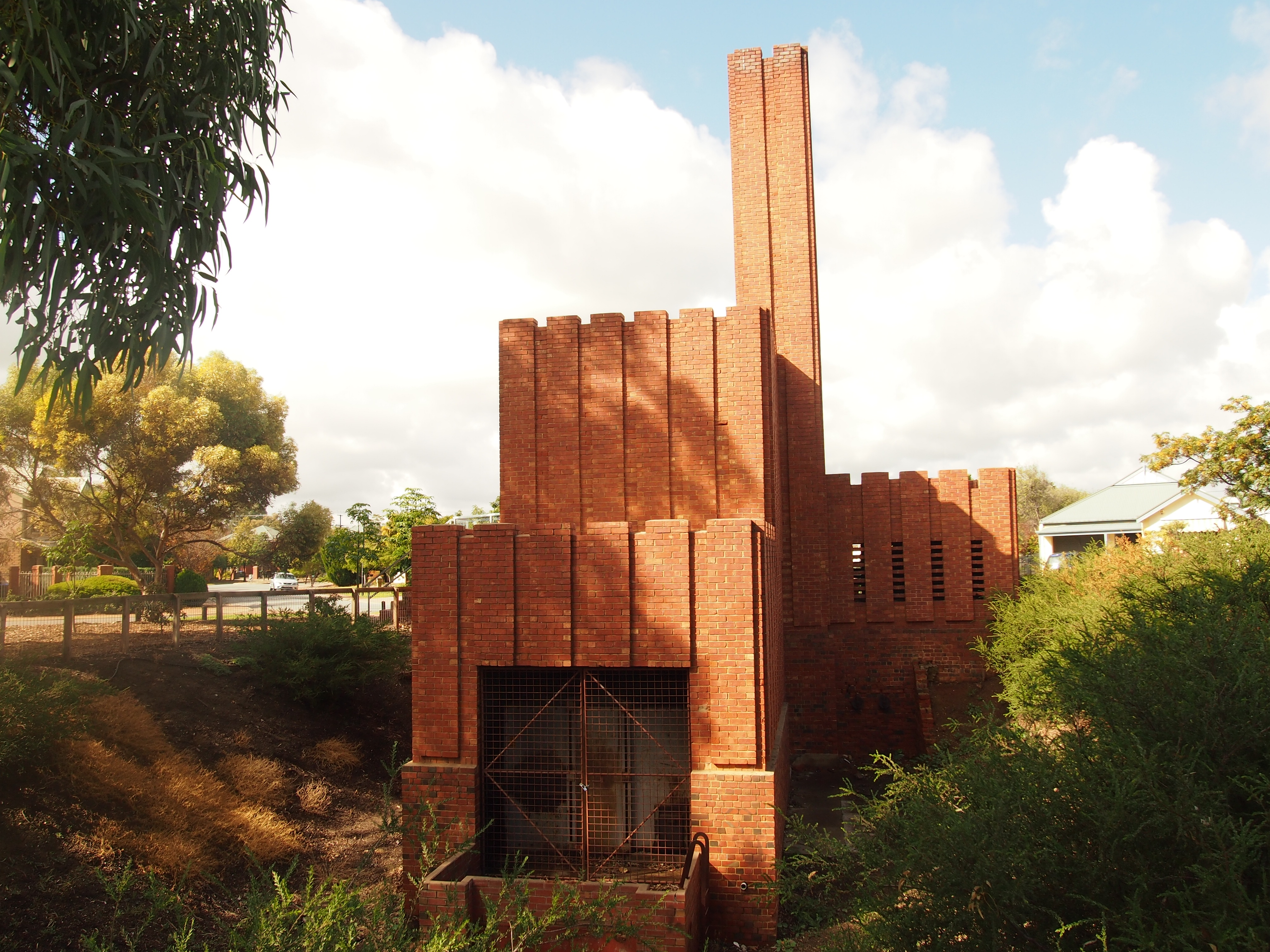
The Hindmarsh Incinerator in Josiah Mitton Reserve, designed by Walter Burley Griffin in 1935.

There are several parks in Brompton, the largest of which is Josiah Mitton Reserve, between Wood Avenue and Burley Griffin Boulevard. The reserve includes the Hindmarsh Incinerator, designed by Walter Burley Griffin in 1935. Completed in 1936, it is one of his two buildings in SA listed as among the 120 nationally significant 20th-century buildings in South Australia, the other being the Thebarton Incinerator at Thebarton. Other notable parks within Brompton include Stormrage Reserve, Thomas Harkness Reserve, and Ethelbert Reserve.

=== Motorsport ===
From 1949 until 1979, Brompton was the home to the world-famous Rowley Park Speedway located on the corner of Torrens Road and Coglin Street. Rowley Park was a 358 metres (392 yards) dirt track speedway built in the old Brompton Brick Pits and operated 23 meetings per season (usually October to April) on Friday nights and was capable of holding over 10,000 spectators. The speedway hosted numerous Australian and South Australian speedway championships through its history. From 1954 until 1973, the speedway was promoted by leading Adelaide identity Kym Bonython who made Rowley Park 'the' place to be in Adelaide on a Friday night during summer. Rowley Park closed on 4 April 1979 and is now the site of the Kym Bonython housing estate.

In 1965, Rowley Park was the site of Australia's first Demolition derby.

== Transportation ==
=== Roads ===
Brompton is primarily serviced by Torrens Road, which connects the suburb to Adelaide city centre.

Hawker Street cuts through the centre of the suburb. Prior to 1956, a tram operated down Hawker street, connecting to the Cheltenham races and Croydon cinema. In the 1980s Hawker street had fallen into such a poor state it was considered the worst street in Adelaide.

Many of the local streets were established in the 19th century. Consequently, roadways tend to be narrow and, with a small volume of traffic, quiet.

=== Public transport ===
Brompton is serviced by public transport run by the Adelaide Metro.

==== Trains ====
There is no train stop in Ridleyton but the Grange and Outer Harbor railway lines pass nearby. The closest station is Bowden. On the Gawler railway line the closest station is Ovingham.

==== Buses ====
The suburb is serviced by the following bus routes:

- 230 232
- 250, 251, 252
- 253, 254, N254

== See also ==
- List of Adelaide suburbs
