= Weekly Times Messenger =

- Type: Weekly suburban newspaper
- Format: Tabloid
- Owner: News Limited
- Editor: Michelle Etheridge
- Staff writers: Alicia Melville-Smith and Matt Hagias
- Founded: 1954
- Ceased publication: 2020
- Website: www.messengerwest.com.au

Weekly Times Messenger was a weekly suburban newspaper in Adelaide, South Australia, part of the Messenger Newspapers group. The Weekly Times' area stretched from Woodville in the north, through to Adelaide Airport in the south, and covered many of Adelaide's coastal suburbs, including Grange and Henley Beach.

The newspaper generally reported on events of interest in its distribution area, including the suburbs of Henley Beach, Woodville, Thebarton and West Lakes. It also covers the City of West Torrens and City of Port Adelaide Enfield councils.

In 2007, it had a circulation of 61,739 and a readership of 81,000.

On 28 May 2020, as part of an effort to "streamline [its] community titles" and issues relating to the COVID-19 pandemic, News Corp Australia's executive chairman Michael Miller announced to staff that the paper would cease physical publication and instead "publish local stories under their regional or city-based masthead."

As of December 2022, they continue local reporting on The Advertiser website.

== History ==
The Woodville Times was established by Messenger in 1954. In 1959 it was renamed the Weekly Times. Two years later, in 1961, Messenger owner Roger Baynes acquired the Westside News Review, which also covered the western suburbs, from John Carroll. The paper was renamed the Westside.

In 1984, the Westside was renamed Westside Messenger and the Weekly Times was renamed Weekly Times Messenger. In 1992, the Westside Messenger was merged into the Weekly Times Messenger to form one paper covering the entire western suburbs.
