= Finsbury railway line =

Former railway line in Adelaide, South Australia

Finsbury Line

Overview
- Status: Closed and Removed
- Locale: Adelaide, South Australia
- Termini: Adelaide; Finsbury Stores
- Stations: Woodville

History
- Opened: 1940
- Closed: 1979

Technical
- Line length: 9.5 km (5.9 mi)
- Number of tracks: Double track to Woodville; Single track to Finsbury Stores

The Finsbury railway line is a defunct railway in north western Adelaide which was used mainly for industrial purposes in the 20th century. It ran through the suburbs of Woodville, Woodville North, Pennington and Ottoway, connecting the Outer Harbor line with the Dry Creek-Port Adelaide line. It serviced four stations; Actil, Woodville North, No. 18 Shed, and Finsbury Stores. It closed in 1979 and was dismantled in 1985.

== Route ==
The Finsbury line departed from the main Outer Harbor line north west of Woodville station, and headed north, parallel to the eastern side of the Cheltenham Park Racecourse, where the Actil station was located, 8.2 kilometres from Adelaide station. It crossed Torrens Road and turned due north, parallel to Audley Street through Woodville North and Glenroy Street, Pennington. The Finsbury station was located where the al-Khalil mosque now stands, at the corner of Torrens Road and Audley Street. The line then crossed Grand Junction Road and travelled parallel and between Eastern Parade and Agnes Street, before meeting the Dry Creek line.

== History ==
The Finsbury line was opened in September 1940 and departed from the main Port Line at Woodville station. It headed in a northerly direction and serviced a wartime munitions works at Cheltenham Park (Actil Station) and a Government Supply Depot at Finsbury station. It was built primarily to service wartime industrial plants. Following the conclusion of the war, the industrial activity in Athol Park was maintained for a period, before declining to an extent that the Finsbury line was regarded as unnecessary, leading to its removal. A few remnants like the rail corridor and ballast at Gillman Junction, a former platform at Woodville, a goods platform and some track covered by concrete are all that exist of the line today.
