= Ferryden Park, South Australia =

Ferryden Park
- Suburb
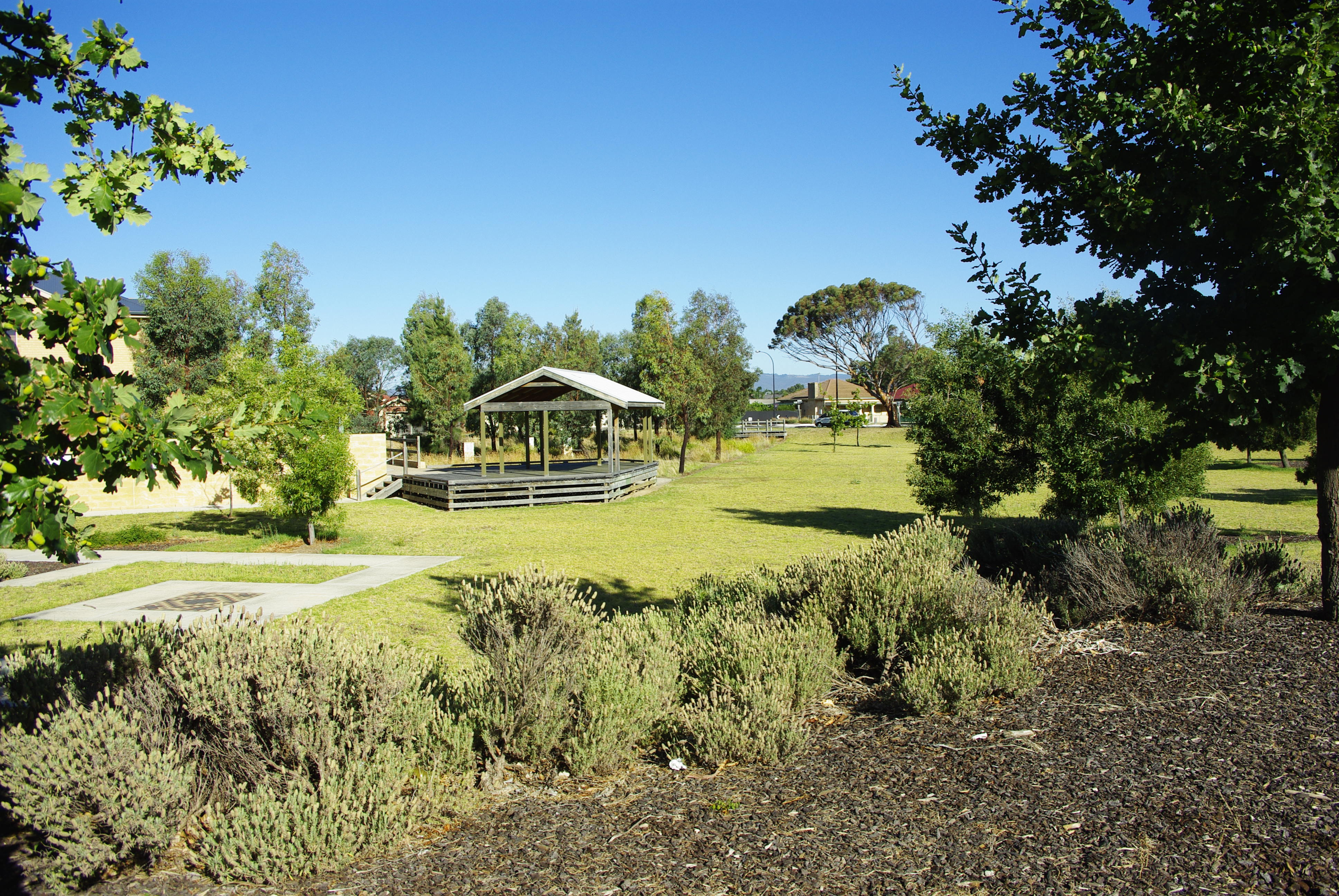
- Richard Day Reserve, facing south-east from York Terrace

- Country: Australia
- State: South Australia
- City: Adelaide
- LGA: City of Port Adelaide Enfield
- Location: 7.5 km (4.7 mi) from Adelaide
- Established: 1924

Government
  - State electorate: Croydon
  - Federal division: Adelaide

Area
  - Total: 1.2 km^{2} (0.46 sq mi)

Population
  - Total: 4,495 (SAL 2021)
- Postcode: 5010
Suburbs around Ferryden Park
Mansfield Park	Angle Park	Regency Park
Woodville Gardens	Ferryden Park	Regency Park
Kilkenny	Croydon Park	Devon Park

Ferryden Park (postcode 5010) is a north-western suburb of Adelaide 6.3 km from the central business district, in the state of South Australia, Australia. Situated in the City of Port Adelaide Enfield local government area, it is adjacent to Kilkenny, Angle Park, Woodville Gardens, Croydon Park, and Regency Park. It is bounded to the north by Murray Street, west by Liberty Grove and Hassell Street, south by Regency Road and to the east by Days Road.

The name derives from the seaport village of Ferryden on the southern fringe of Montrose, Scotland. This was the port from which the family of the suburb's founder, William Duthie, emigrated in the 1850s. The suburb contains many street names deriving from traditional Scottish place and family names, such as Montrose, Orkney, Nairn, McDonald, McRostie and Lachlan.

== History ==
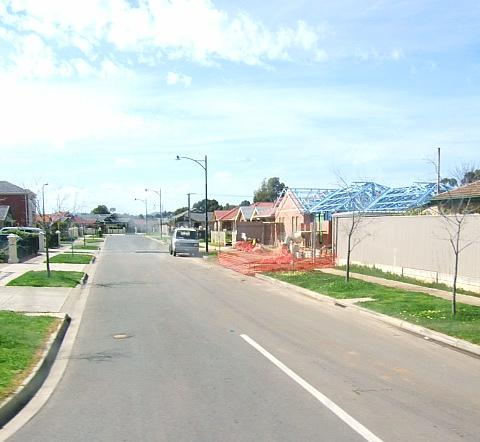
Ferryden Park streetscape in 2008, seven years after the commencement of the urban rejuvenation project

Ferryden Park was formed in 1924 by a subdivision of the west part of section 398 of the Hundred of Yatala by William Duthie. Duthie was a dairy man of an area of land known as Tam O'Shanter Belt. Duthie resided on Islington Road (now Regency Road) and was later a councillor and chairman of Yatala South council representing the West Ward, also known as Tam O'Shanter Ward. Prior to the Second World War, the area was known as Croydon Park, being part of the present-day suburb of that name, to the south. It mainly consisted of pastures and open land and was named Ferryden Park in 1943. In 1947, plans were approved for 80 pairs of SA Housing Trust cottages to be constructed in the vicinity of McRostie and Coker Streets.

In the 1990s, plans were made for the Westwood Urban Renewal Project, of which Angle Park, Mansfield Park, Woodville Gardens, and Athol Park are also a part. Ferryden Park was the first suburb to be rejuvenated as part of the project.

== Demographics ==
Ferryden Park is home to a large immigrant population. As of 2016 47% of the population was born outside Australia.

The initial settlement of the suburb coincided with a large wave of immigrants from Eastern Europe arriving in Australia, following the Second World War. Although most of their children have moved on, a large number of immigrant retirees still live in the area. This was reflected in the peak enrolment at Ferryden Park Primary School in 1959: 639 students. Another wave of immigration occurred in the 1980s, when Vietnamese immigrants arrived after the Vietnam War. As of 2016 15% of residents were born in Vietnam and 22% of residents preferred to speak Vietnamese language at home.

As of 2016 more than half of the population is from a non-Anglophone background, with 59% preferring to speak a language other than English at home.

== Government ==
Ferryden Park is located within the federal seat of Adelaide. It is a distinctly pro-Australian Labor Party suburb, with the Ferryden Park Primary School booth recording the second highest two-party-preferred (TPP) vote in the state for the ALP at the 1998, 2001 and 2004 federal elections, garnering more than 75% on each occasion. At the 2011 and 2014 elections, after the Ferryden Park polling place had closed, the polling booth in the neighbouring suburb of Woodville Gardens on its west recorded the second highest TPP votes for the ALP.

Ferryden Park has been in the state government electorate of Croydon, in part since 2015 and in its entirety since 2018. Previously it was in the Electoral district of Enfield. Ferryden Park is governed locally by the City of Port Adelaide Enfield being located in that council's Parks ward. Before 1996, Ferryden Park was in the south west of the City of Enfield council area.

== Facilities ==
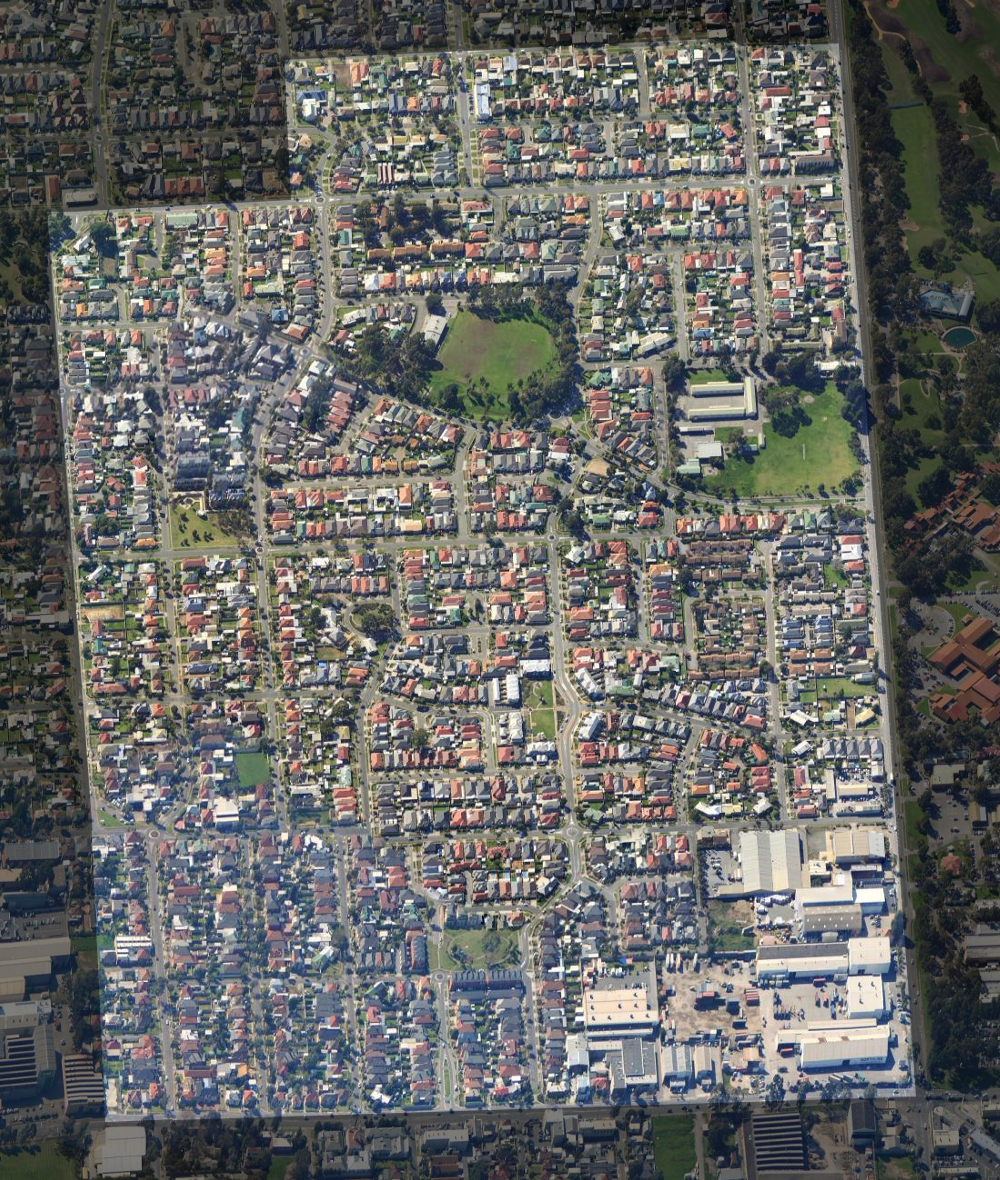
Aerial view of Ferryden Park showing suburb boundaries

There is a small shopping complex along Ridley Grove, including the Ferryden Park post office. The Parks Community Centre in adjoining Angle Park provides a library, health centre, gym and fitness centre, swimming complex, council office, and other community services.

=== Schools ===
The Ferryden Park Primary School closed in a merger with other nearby schools in 2010 to form Woodville Gardens School. It was established in the 1953 with around 300–400 students, with enrolment peaking in that decade at over 600. From 2011 the suburb has been served by the newly formed Woodville Gardens B-7 School for primary school aged children.

The Parks High School, located adjacent to the Parks Community Centre, was closed in 1996 due to declining enrolments. It was the local zoned high school prior to its closure. From 1996 to 2006, the local zoned high school was Croydon High School, in Croydon. Towards the end of this period a significant number of the families in the area choose to send their children to other schools, such as Woodville High School or schools in the city centre. As a result, Croydon High was forced to close in 2006.

=== Transport ===
Liberty Grove is served by the 251 and 252 bus services, while the 239 bus service travels along Coker Street and Days Road. The 300 Suburban Connector bus services Regency Road along with the city-bound 230 and 232 bus routes.

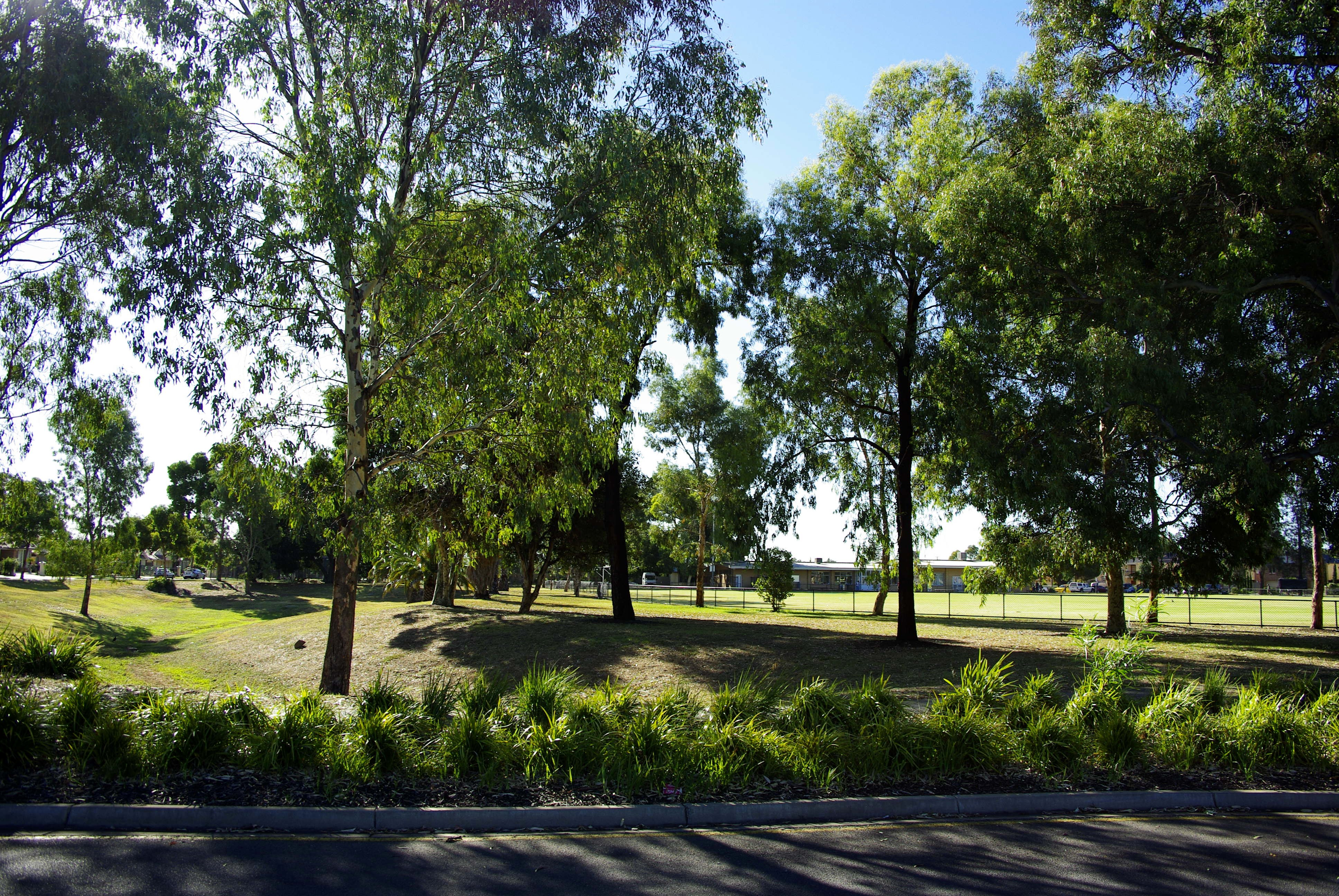
Ferryden Park Reserve, facing north west from the intersection of Montrose and Sutherland streets

=== Parks and reserves ===
Ferryden Park contains several parks and reserves. The largest is Ferryden Park Reserve, bordered north, east and south by Wiloughby Street, Sutherland Road and Montrose Street, followed by Richard Day Reserve, bordered east, south and west by Durham Terrace, Lachlan Street and York Terrace respectively. Ferryden Park Reserve contains an all-purpose sports oval and is the home of the Adelaide Olympic football (soccer) club. Other parks in the suburb include Tao Dan Reserve (Sutherland Road), Mikawomma Reserve (Ridley Grove) and Shillabeer Reserve (Mcrostie Street).

== Residents ==
- Charlie Walsh, previous long-serving coach of the Australian Olympic track cycling team, grew up in Ferryden Park
- Bruce McAvaney, AFL, Olympics and horseracing commentator on the Seven Network, grew up in Ferryden Park
