= Ferryden Park Football Club =

Ferryden Park

Names
- Full name: Ferryden Park Football Club
- Nickname: Lions

Club details
- Founded: 1964
- Dissolved: 1995
- Colours: Green Gold
- Former ground: Ferryden Park Reserve (1964–1995)

Ferryden Park Football Club was an Australian rules football club based in Ferryden Park, South Australia that folded following the 1995 South Australian Amateur Football League (SAAFL) season due to financial problems and a lack of players.

== History ==
The club was formed initially as a junior club in March 1964 playing in the West Torrens-Woodville Junior Association. The following season, senior teams were formed and the club joined the North Adelaide District Football Association. After a short stay in the North Adelaide Association, the club shifted to the South Australian Amateur Football League in 1968 and in 1978 became a founding member of the South Australian Football Association. In 1985, the club returned to the South Australian Amateur Football League where it competed until its demise at the end of 1995.

== A-Grade Premierships ==
- North Adelaide District Football Association A2 (1)
  - 1965
- South Australian Amateur Football League A2 (1)
  - 1976
- South Australian Amateur Football League A3 (1)
  - 1970
- South Australian Amateur Football League A4 (1)
  - 1969
