= Silvio Apponyi =

Australian sculptor

Silvio Apponyi OAM
- Born: Albert Silvio Apponyi; 4 July 1949 (age 77); Bavaria, Germany
- Education: Academy of Fine Arts, Munich, SA School of Art
- Occupation: Sculptor
- Years active: 1969–present
- Notable work: Whale Tail, Bob the Railway Dog, Flame of Learning, Memories in a Suitcase
- Spouse: Natalija Apponyi
- Children: 4
- Website: www.apponyi.net

Silvio Apponyi OAM (born 4 July 1949) is an Australian sculptor based in the Adelaide Hills in South Australia, noted for depictions of animals.

== Early life and education ==
Silvio Apponyi was born on 4 July 1949 in a refugee camp in Dachau, near Munich, migrating to Australia during infancy. His father Albert Frederick (Frigyes) Apponyi claimed descent from an illegitimate line of the Apponyi family.

The family moved to Adelaide, and Apponyi had a difficult home life. He started wood carving when he was about five years old. He attended Woodville High School, where he was encouraged to apply for a scholarship to art school.

== Career ==
Apponyi studied sculpture at the North Adelaide School of Arts, and during that time won a German Academic Exchange Scholarship (DAAD), and went on to study for a year at the Munich Academy.

Since then he has had one-man shows and group exhibitions locally, interstate and overseas. He has won several prizes, accepted commissions, conducted workshops in Australia and Malaysia, and studied wood-block printmaking under a Japanese master. His work is featured in many private collections both here and overseas and in public spaces across Australia.

Apponyi was awarded the Medal of the Order of Australia (OAM) in the 2020 Queen's Birthday Honours for "service to the visual arts as a sculptor".

Apponyi lives and works from his studio located at Balhannah in South Australia.

== Major commissions ==
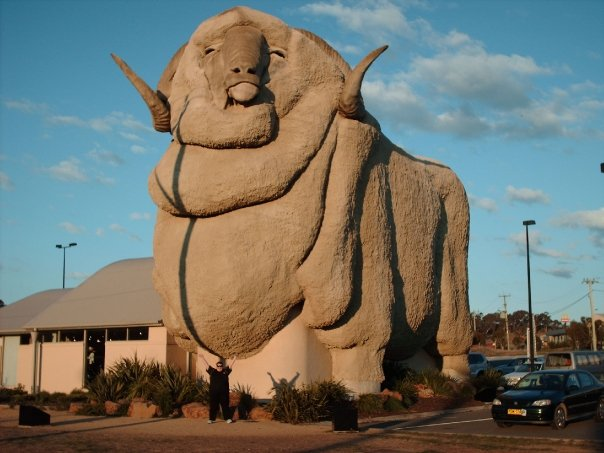
The Big Merino, Goulburn

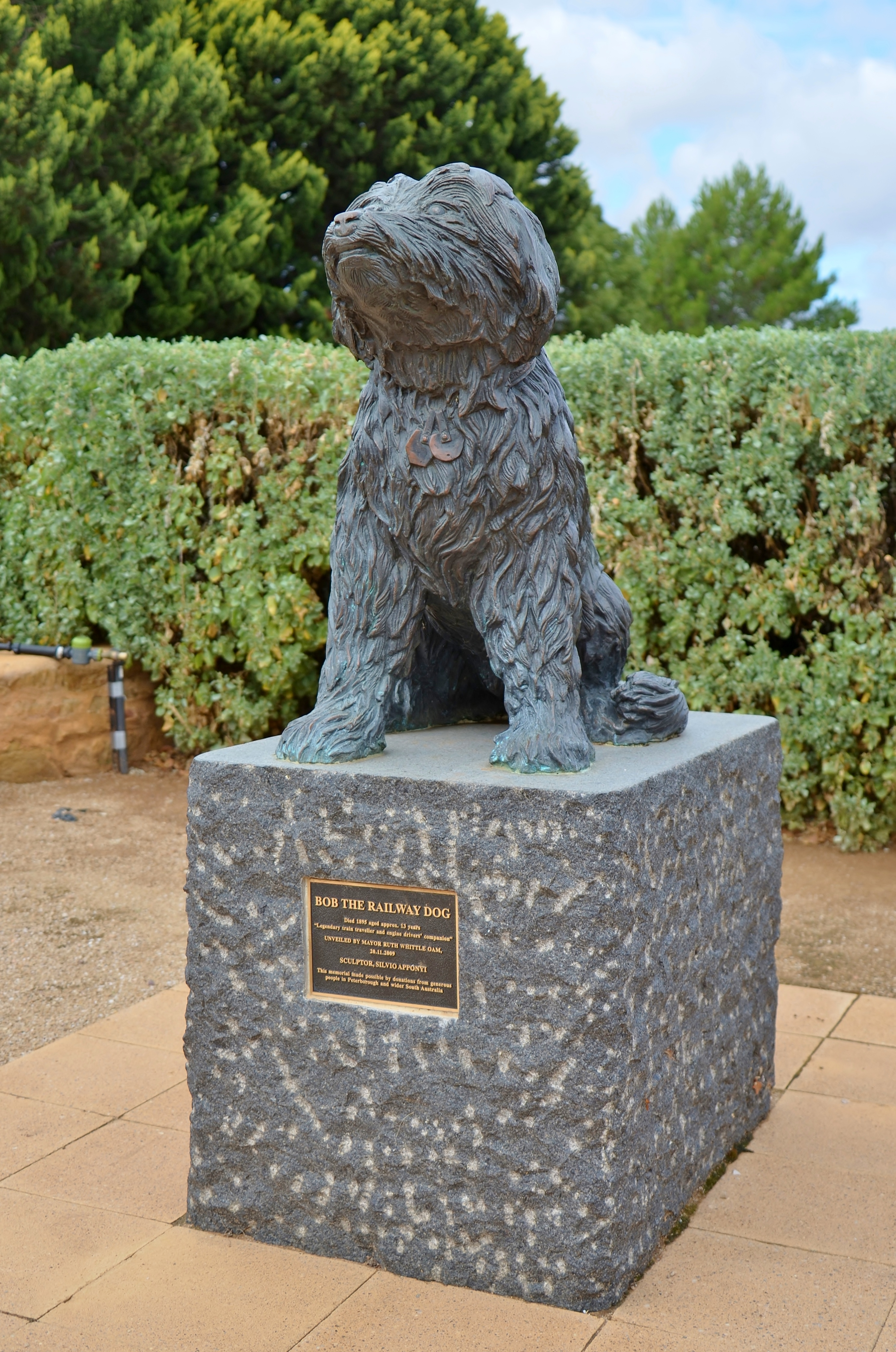
Bob the Railway Dog, Peterborough

1981

- University of Adelaide's Waite Institute Aries

1985

- Goulburn NSW, The Big Merino (Note: Goulburn architect Garry Dutaillis designed the frame; Apponyi fleshed out the shape with rods, and Adelaide builder Glyn Sennar and his crew of concreters applied the skin and cement coat.)
- St Patrick's College, Goulburn, life-sized St Patrick

1986

- St Dominic's College, North Adelaide St Dominic

1988

- Tamworth, New South Wales, Bicentennial Park, 67 stone sculptures & reliefs

1989

- State Bank Tower, Adelaide laminated Wooden Relief

1990

- Mt Annan Botanic Garden NSW, sundial of human involvement – with Sundials SA
- Flinders University of SA, bronze & marble Squid & Prey
- Kingston, SE SA, Maria Creek beautification, granite sculptures & sundial
- Berri SA, A Special Place for Jimmy James – with Bluey Roberts

1991 – 2006

- Mitsubishi National Basketball League Trophy

1992

- Henley Beach Catholic Church, Mary with Child (RAIA Award),
- Granite Island Sea lion carved in Situ
- Healesville Sanctuary, Victoria Laughing Kookaburras

1993

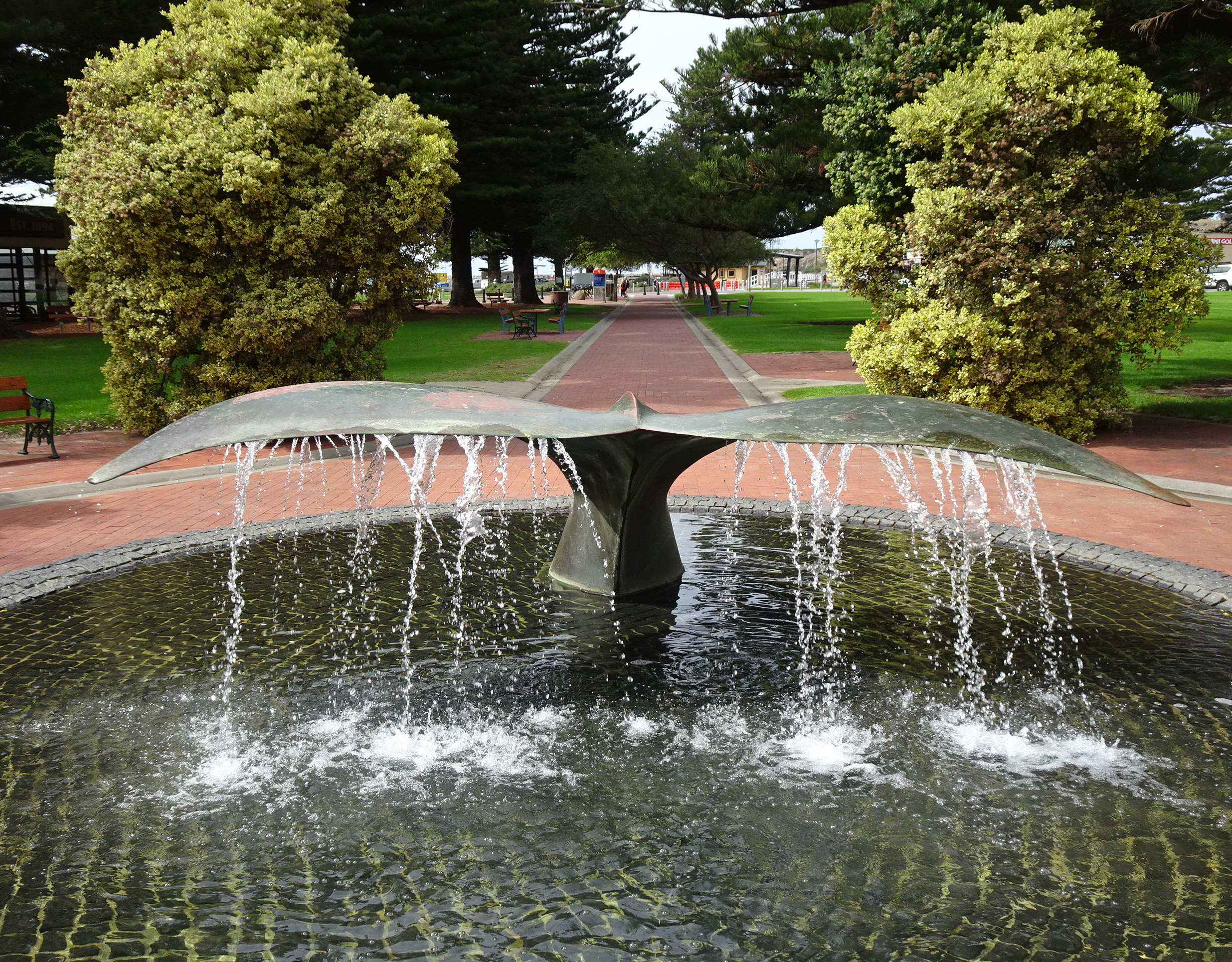
- The Whale Tail Fountain in Victor Harbor.
  Adelaide Zoo Sealion,
- Victor Harbor Whale Tail
- Flinders University Woman Washing her Hair
- Ashford Special School relief carving on granite
- Townsend School for the Blind, Birdbath with Bronze Tortoise

1994

- Keswick SA Wedgetailed Eagle
- Regency College of TAFE Marine Sculpture

1996

- Wagga Wagga Waterbirds & Goannas
- Lutheran Homes, Hope Valley, Granite Fountain
- Healesville Sanctuary Kangaroo and Emu with Chicks

1997

- Spring Hill Estate SA, wooden carvings, stone reliefs, bronze sculptures
- Burnside Shopping Village, granite fountain
- Monarto Zoological Park SA, granite & bronze goanna birdbath (donated by the artist)

1998

- Dudley Park SA, Children's Cemetery, bronze Pelican & Chicks
- Eden Hills SA, Colebrook Home site, granite Fountain of Tears collaboration with Indigenous Artists

1999

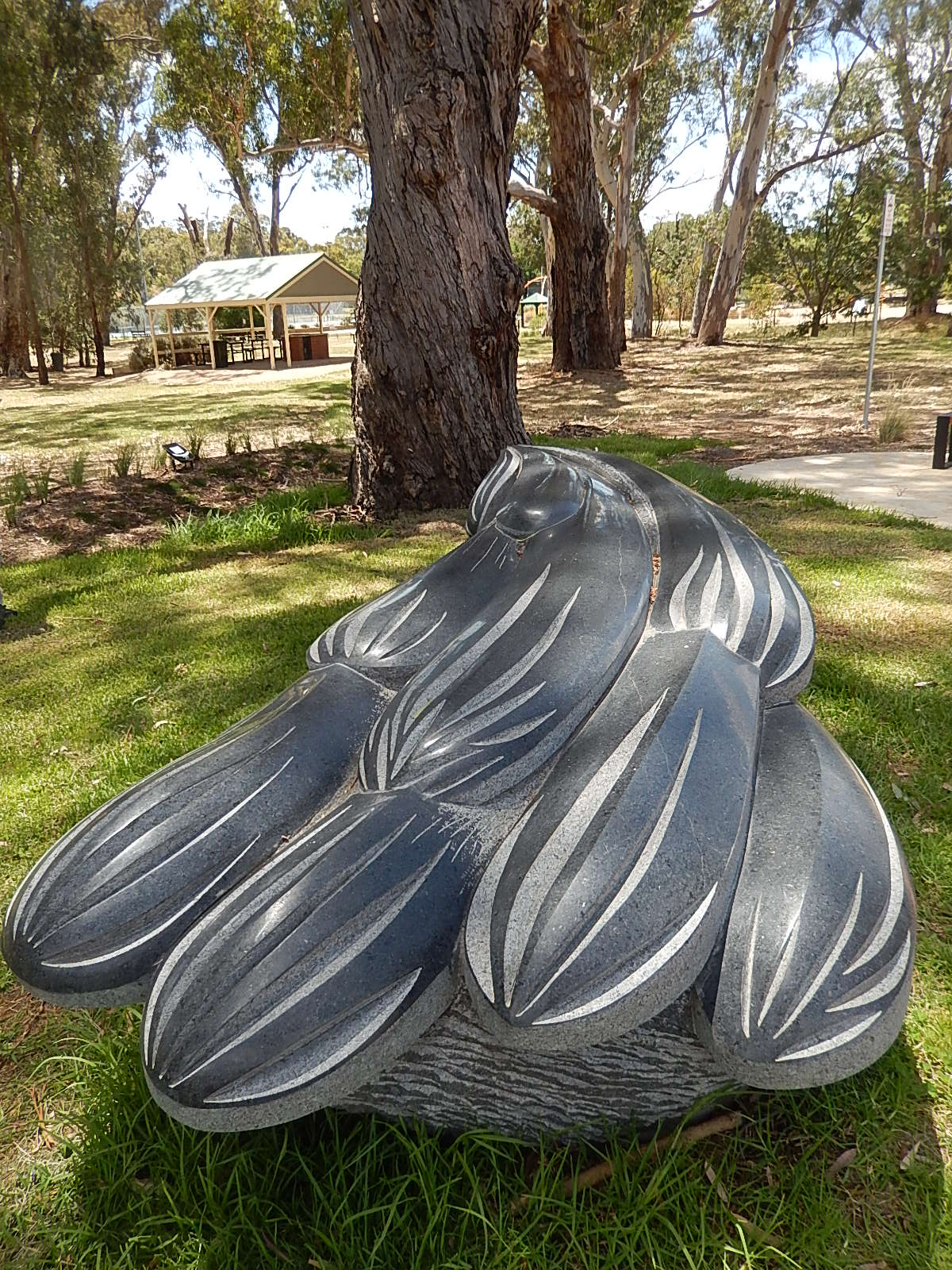
- Sculpture Trail, Balhannah, South Australia
  BRL Hardy's Banrock Station Wine & Wetlands Centre, Kingston-on-Murray SA, bronze Pelican & Chicks
- University of Adelaide's Waite Institute, bronze West Highland White Terrier for Greg Johns' tribute to Peter Waite
- Eden Hills SA, Colebrook Home site, life-sized bronze Grieving Mother collaboration with Shereen Rankine
- Darwin NT, Heritage Walk drinking fountain with Chinese theme, collaboration with Aladar Apponyi

2000

- Thredbo Village NSW, life-sized bronze Eastern Wombat & Grey Kangaroo
- Gilles Street Primary School, Adelaide, demonstrated granite-carving on boulders which form landscaping for C. Lawrence's mural
- Cleland Wildlife Park, Adelaide Hills SA, life-sized bronze Koala

2001

- Parliament House, Canberra, green marble lizard
- Burnside Village SA, granite water feature with 3 elements

2002

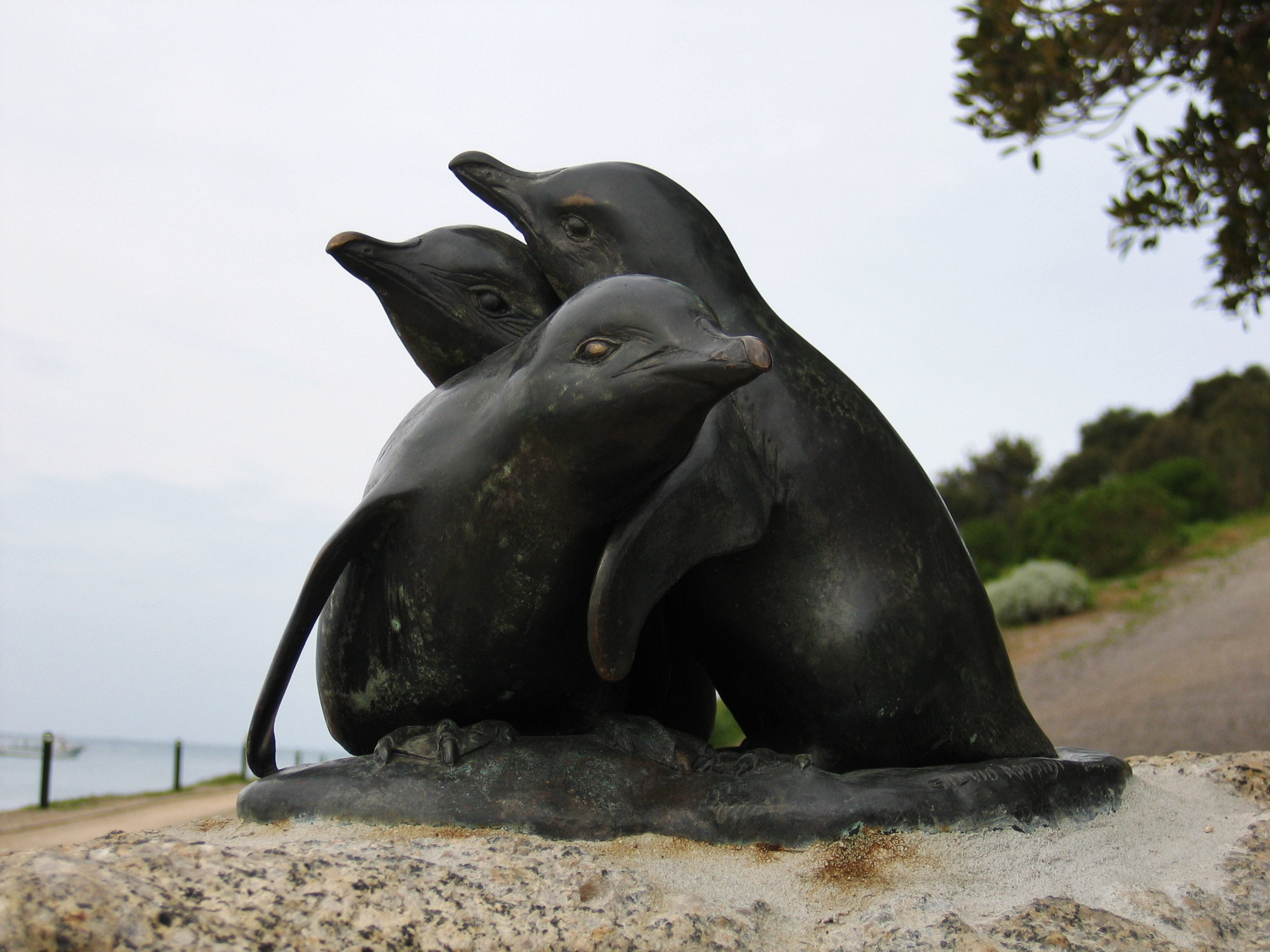
- Bronze penguins by Apponyi at the entrance to Granite Island
  Victor Harbor SA, bronze Penguins for gateway to Granite Island ("Kaiki"), w/ Martin Corbin
- SANBL Headquarters, bronze bust of former player Mark Davis
- Mikawomma Reserve, Woodville Gardens SA, series of relief carvings. Collaboration w/ Potter/Minuzzo. Design Institute Award

2003

- Mt Gambier SA, Kimberley Clark foyer, limestone relief, Red-Tailed Black Cockatoos for Landscaping

2004

- North Adelaide SA, St Dominic's Priory College, Adelaide, water feature and Relief of Young Kaurna girl

2005

- Adelaide Convention Centre, River Torrens Precinct, Meals on Wheels 50th Anniversary SA, 2.6m x 4m granite relief
- Scotch College, Torrens Park SA, granite relief Technology and Science

2006

- Mt Barker District Council Walking Trail SA, Redgum Mother & Toddler Catherine & Allana carved in situ

2007

- September: Maroochy Qld, 3 week residency to carve granite sculptures for Botanic Gardens
- October: Elliston, Eyre Peninsula, to give workshops at "Sculpture on the Cliffs"
- Mt Gambier SA, Memories in a Suitcase, 2m high granite memorial to migrant settlers

2009

- Peterborough SA, Bob the Railway Dog

2010

- February: St Mark's College, North Adelaide, Flame of Learning white marble column

== Extra reading ==
- "Silvio Apponyi – Bungendore Wood Works Gallery". bungendorewoodworks.com.au.
- "Silvio Apponyi – Sculptor". apponyi.net.
- "Adelaide Hills International Sculpture Symposium". adelaidehillssculpture.com.au.
- Gallery, Art Images. "Silvio Apponyi". artimagesgallery.com.au.
- "Silvio Apponyi at Yallingup Galleries". yallingupgalleries.com.au.
