= Angle Park, South Australia =

Angle Park
- Suburb
- Coordinates: 34.86°S 138.56°E
- Country: Australia
- State: South Australia
- City: Adelaide
- LGA: City of Port Adelaide Enfield
- Location: 10 km (6.2 mi) from Adelaide
- Established: 1950s

Government
  - State electorate: Croydon (2018)
  - Federal division: Adelaide

Population
  - Total: 1,555 (SAL 2021)
- Postcode: 5010
Suburbs around Angle Park
	Wingfield
Mansfield Park	Angle Park	Regency Park
Woodville Gardens	Ferryden Park

Angle Park is a north-western suburb of Adelaide 10 km from the CBD, in the state of South Australia, Australia and falls under the City of Port Adelaide Enfield. It is adjacent to Wingfield, Mansfield Park, Ferryden Park, and Regency Park. The post code for Angle Park is 5010. It is bounded to the north by Grand Junction Road, west by Trafford Street, and to the east by Days Road and the North-South Motorway.

== History ==
Angle Park was original a subdivision of sections 401 and 402 of the Hundred of Yatala. It was divided into 16 4-acre (1.6 ha) allotments by Henry Cowan (son of James Cowan) in the 1920s.

Prior to the Second World War, Angle Park mainly consisted of pastures and open land. Its development as a residential area coincided with the post-war boom in the 1950s. The suburb was named in 1950 by the South Australian Housing Trust, after Angle Road, which traversed the suburb at a 45-degree angle north west from South Road, near Kateena Street, to the north west corner of the suburb (at the Plymouth Road intersection of Grand Junction Road). Only a short segment of the road now exists, but the dividing line between section 403 and 404 of the Hundred of Yatala defines the location of the historic road.

In 1957 the SA Housing Trust purchased a large amount of land in the area to construct public housing. In 1960, the Angle Park Boys Technical High School was constructed on Cowan Street, followed by the Angle Park Girls Technical High School the following year. They operated separately until 1977 when they combined to become the Angle Park High School. The complex was expanded in 1979 to become the Parks Community Centre in 1979, which included a council library, with the high school becoming known as the Parks High School.

In the 1990s, plans were made for the Westwood Urban Renewal project, of which Ferryden Park, Mansfield Park, Woodville Gardens, and Athol Park are also a part. This involved the demolition of many of the Housing Trust homes, to be replaced by either private housing, or a lesser number of newer, townhouse-style Housing Trust homes. The building began in 2001, and in 2004 and 2005 began to affect Angle Park.

== Facilities ==
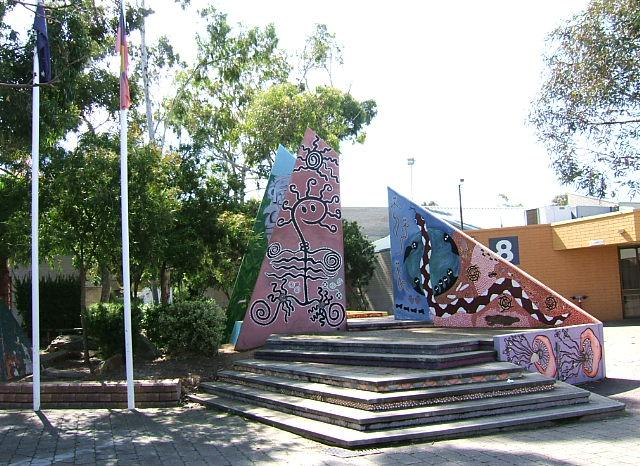
Sculpture at the Parks Community Centre

There were three primary schools in the area, being the public Mansfield Park Primary School, established in 1969, closed in 2010, and the Catholic St Patrick's School, both of which are in the adjacent Mansfield Park, and the Ferryden Park Primary School which also closed in 2010 and was replaced with a new B-7 superschool which opened at Woodville Gardens at the start of 2011 Called Woodville Gardens School There is a small shopping complex at the corner of Trafford and Wilson Streets, and the Parks Community Centre, provides a library, health centre, gym and fitness centre, swimming complex, council office, and a few other community services. The Greyhound Park racing facility exists on the eastern side of the suburb, and it is also the site of a fire brigade unit and an ETSA Utilities manufacturing plant where Stobie poles are assembled. It was also the site of the Parks High School, which was closed at the end of 1996, due to declining enrolments. Currently, the local public zone high school is Woodville High school, in Woodville, South Australia. However, a large number of the families in the area choose to send their children to other private schools, mainly in the city centre, which was one of the causes of the closure of the Parks High School in 1996 and the nearby Croydon High school in 2006.

== Transport ==
Trafford Street is served by the 251(311) and 252(312) bus services, while the 239 & 250(316) serves Days and Grand Junction Road. The 361 serves Grand Junction Road.

== Demographics ==
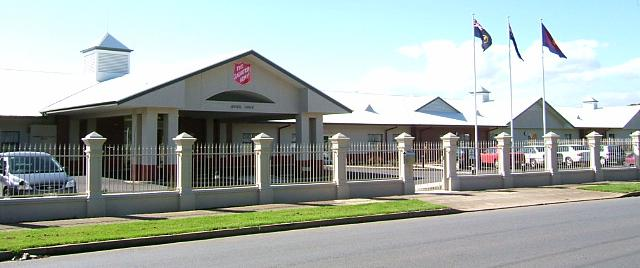
Salvation Army nursing home at Angle Park.

Angle Park is home to a large immigrant population. The initial settlement of the suburb coincided with a large wave of immigrants from Eastern Europe arriving in Australia, following the Second World War. Although most of their children have moved on, a large number of immigrant retirees still live in the area. Another wave of immigration occurred in the 1980s, when Vietnamese immigrants arrived after the Vietnam War. Currently, more than 50% of the population is from a non-English speaking background.

== Politics ==
Angle Park is located within the federal seat of Port Adelaide. It is the most pro-Australian Labor Party area in South Australia, recording the highest two-party-preferred vote in the state for the ALP at the Mansfield Park Primary School booth (the closest booth to Angle Park) at the 1998, 2001 and 2004 federal elections, garnering more than 80% on each occasion.
