= Mikawomma Reserve =

Coordinates: 34.8646°S 138.5557°E

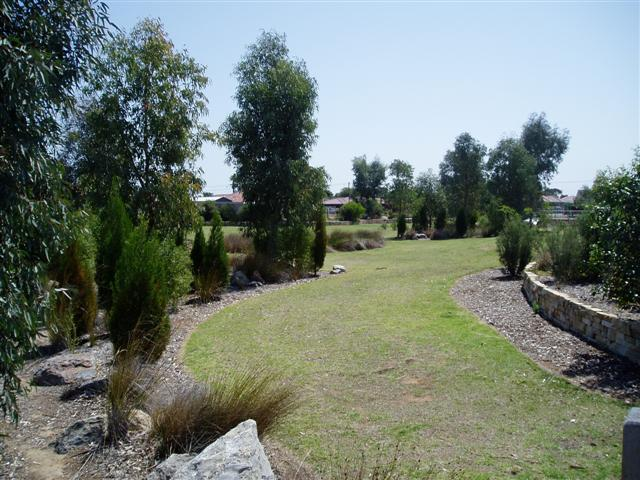
Mikawomma Reserve

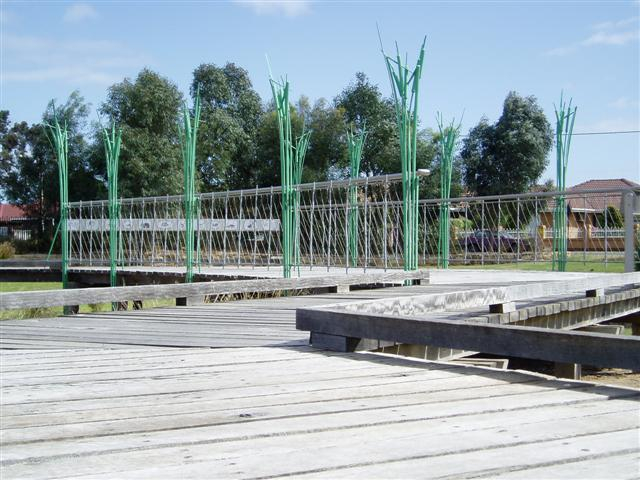
The bridge

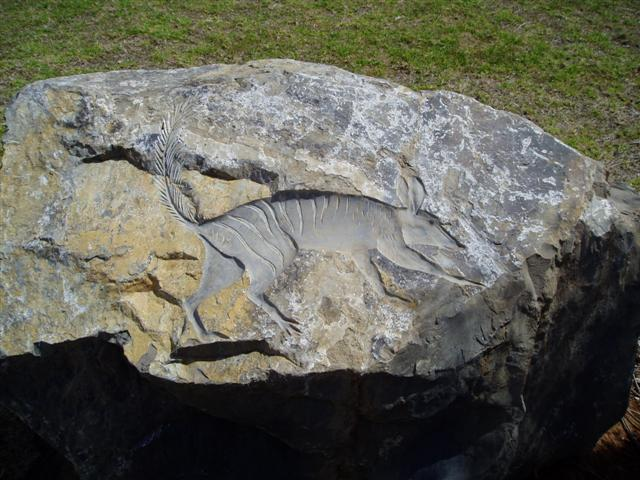
A bilby carved into a boulder.

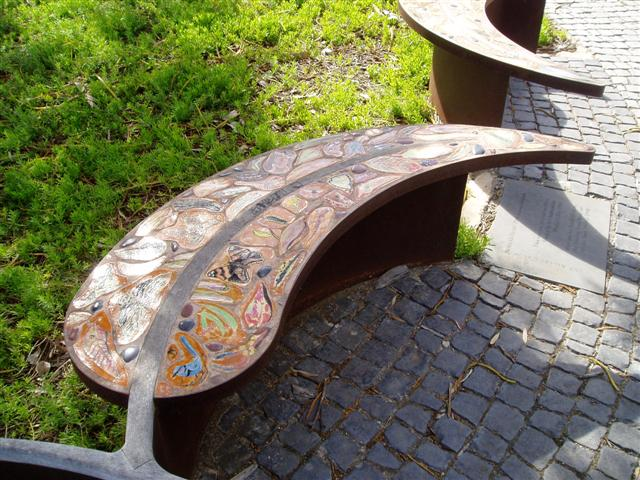
School children painted the tiles that cover the gum leaf shaped seats.

The Mikawomma Reserve is found in the suburb of Woodville Gardens on the corner of Liberty Grove & Ridley Grove in South Australia, Australia. Mikawomma is the Kaurna name for the plain that lies between Adelaide and Port Adelaide (Teichelmann & Schürmann, 1840: 16 Grammar section). The Kaurna people are the traditional custodians of the Adelaide Plains area. The landscape design and the artworks in Mikawomma Reserve reflect indigenous plants and animals as well as culture and history.

== Design ==
=== Stormwater management ===
Mikawomma is a public reserve and an innovative stormwater management system. The reserve has a gently sloping basin and in times of heavy rain it temporarily holds stormwater from the local area. The water is released slowly back in the underground pipe system preventing streets and footpaths from flooding.

=== Landscape ===
The landscape design for Mikawomma is based on plants native to Adelaide area. There is a dry creek bed that meanders through the reserve. The plants along the creek and the basin of the reserve are the same species that occur along creeks in the Adelaide plains. Similarly, the plants are higher up around the perimeter of the reserve are native to the Adelaide foothills. The Kaurna people used some of the plants in Mikawomma Reserve as a source of food or useful materials.

=== Artwork ===
There are many works of art in the reserve. Ideas for the artworks were developed in consultation with community members and specifically the Kaurna community. Local people and school children painted the tiles that cover the gum leaf shaped seats. The tiles have images of the things that you would find on the forest floor. The feature of the reserve is the sculpture World of Knowledge – Tip of the Iceberg. This work represents Kaurna people as educators. Some of the artworks are hidden and need to be discovered, like the animals carved into boulders, and stepping stones with Kaurna numbers. Images of the carved animals are on the bridge. The bridge railing is styled on a fishing net that resembles a Kaurna fishing net woven from bulrush fibres.

Adrian Potter and Bridgette Minuzzo were principal artists in the creation of Mikawomma Reserve. Other artists who have worked on the reserve include: Silvio Apponyi, Geoff Barnes, Adam Barnes, Mark Blackman, Tony Colangelo and Dianne Longley.

== Development ==
=== Project partners and community ===
The development of Mikawomma Reserve was funded by the Government of South Australia through Arts SA in partnership with the Westwood Urban Renewal Project, a joint project by Urban Pacific Limited and the South Australian Housing Trust in conjunction with the City of Port Adelaide Enfield.

The project was designed by landscape architect Warwick Keates of Hassell in collaboration with Adrian Potter and Bridgette Minuzzo with the support of the local community.

The board walk was constructed through the construction industry training board with school participation. Other participants in the development of Mikawomma Reserve included members of the Kaurna community, members of the community consultative team, students of Ridley Grove Primary School, students of Ferryden Park Primary School, the representatives of the Parks Community Centre and local residents.

=== Awards ===
The Mikawomma Reserve won four LASA (Landscape Association of South Australia) awards in 2004 in the following categories:

- Category 3: Commercial landscape over $100,000 – Design only
- Category 4: Commercial landscape over $100,000 – Construction only
- Category 11: Most Environmentally Sensitive Project
- Category 14: ABC Talkback Gardening Award
