= Greyhound Park =

Greyhound Racing Venue

- Interactive map of Greyhound Park
- Former names: Angle Park
- Location: 55 Cardigan St, Angle Park, South Australia 5010
- Coordinates: 34°51′27″S 138°33′46″E
- Owner: Greyhound Racing South Australia (GRSA)
- Operator: GRSA
- Capacity: 4,000
- Surface: Sand

Construction
- Groundbreaking: 1971
- Opened: 20 April 1972

Greyhound Park also known as Angle Park is the only greyhound racing venue located in Adelaide, South Australia. The venue is owned and operated by Greyhound Racing South Australia (GRSA) and has an approximate capacity of around 4,000. The track is on Cardigan Street in the northwestern suburb of Angle Park.

The track has a sand surface and a cable lure system and is 457 m (1,499 ft) long with a width of 6.5 m (21 ft). Facilities include the Chasers Restaurant, at 55 Cardigan Street and there are full Totalisator Agency Board (TAB) facilities and bookmakers on site with race meetings taking place on Monday and Thursday nights and Wednesday mornings.

== History ==
The Adelaide Greyhound Racing Club held its first registered meeting with full betting facilities on 20 April 1972.

In May 1990 the track underwent a series of improvements which included the addition of a track view restaurant, bistro and lounge bar. Four years later GRSA (with some assistance of government funding) purchased the freehold of a section of the Harold Tyler Reserve which included the race track.

The track has hosted the Adelaide Cup since 1972. The event was previously held at Waterloo Corner from 1956 and then Bolivar.

== Adelaide Cup ==
Past winners

Year	Winner	Trainer	Time	Distance	Notes
1972	Bristol Miss	Doug Payne	31.52	512m	
1973	Valjuka	Doug Payne	31.48	512m	
1974	Bristol Sue	Doug Payne	31.84	512m	
1975	Turn Pillage	Bernie Neal	30.93	512m	
1976	Golden Spur		30.80	512m	
1977	Cavalier Queen		30.64	512m	
1978	Riviera Tiger		30.49	512m	
1979	Encanto	Clem Mitchell	30.83	512m	
1980	Youthful Prince	Howard Gray	30.72	512m	
1981	Lady Tornquest	Colin Wachtel	30.45	512m	
1982	Smithy's Belle	Cyril Boston	30.89	512m	
1983	Superstar	Darrell Johnstone	30.36	512m	
1984	Knocklaun Gold	Blair Cross	30.24	512m	
1985	Thundering Two	Gary Mellor	30.13	512m	
1986	Farquhar	Alan Kelly	30.28	512m	
1987	Club Edition	Joe Hili	29.94	512m	race record
1988	High Wonder	Bev Hall	30.44	512m	
1989	Kuriarkin	Doug Payne	30.35	512m	
1990	Sandi's Me Mum	Gerry O'Keefe	30.23	512m	
1991	Highly Blessed	Doug Ferrami	29.95	512m	
1992	South Road Sid	Ray Cunneen	29.83	512m	race record
1993	Croatian Star	Joe Perovic	30.17	512m	
1994	Perplexed	Helen Foster	29.49	512m	race record
1995	Forest Fin	C Hughes	29.33	512m	race record
1996	Jurassic Vapour	John Keep	29.55	512m	
1997	Rare Deceit	Merv Patching	30.12	512m	
1998	Rapid Journey	Jane Carruthers	29.34	515m	change to 515m
1999	Young Harrison	Ken Welsh	29.56	515m	
2000	Jack Junior	Peter Giles	29.32	515m	track record
2001	Brett Lee	Darren McDonald	28.88	515m	track record
2002	Brookside Bear	Terry Cahalan	29.67	515m	
2003	Waterview Star	Peter Dapiran	29.34	515m	
2004	Hotline Hero	Kelvin Greenough	29.56	515m	
2005	Collide	Darren McDonald	29.52	515m	
2006	Miss Spicy	Troy Murray	29.46	515m	
2007	Big Time Max	Engin Gemci	29.30	515m	
2008	Whippy's Image	Jason Thompson	29.29	515m	
2009	El Galo	Jason Thompson	29.45	515m	
2010	Dyna Lachlan	Andrea Dailly	29.48	515m	
2011	Kilty Lad+	Kelly Bravo	29.39	515m	
2011	Mepunga Nicky+	Jeff Britton	29.45	515m	
2012	Spud Regis	Andrea Dailly	29.75	515m	
2013	Ernie Bung Arrow	Ken Gill	29.70	515m	
2014	Allen Deed	Andrea Dailly	29.48	515m	
2015	Fernando Bale	Andrea Dailly	29.20	515m	
2016	Aqua Cheetah	Jason Thompson	29.41	515m	
2017	Raw Ability	Anthony Azzopardi	29.50	515m	
2018	Real Simple	Seona Thompson	29.69	515m	
2019	Hooked On Scotch	Jason Thompson	29.44	515m	
2020	Golden Knight	Troy Murray	29.55	515m	
2021	Do It	Jeffrey Britton	30.07	530m	change to 530m
2022	Buzz Junkie	Petar Jovanovic	30.72	530m	

+ held twice in January and October
