= Kilkenny, South Australia =

Kilkenny
- Suburb
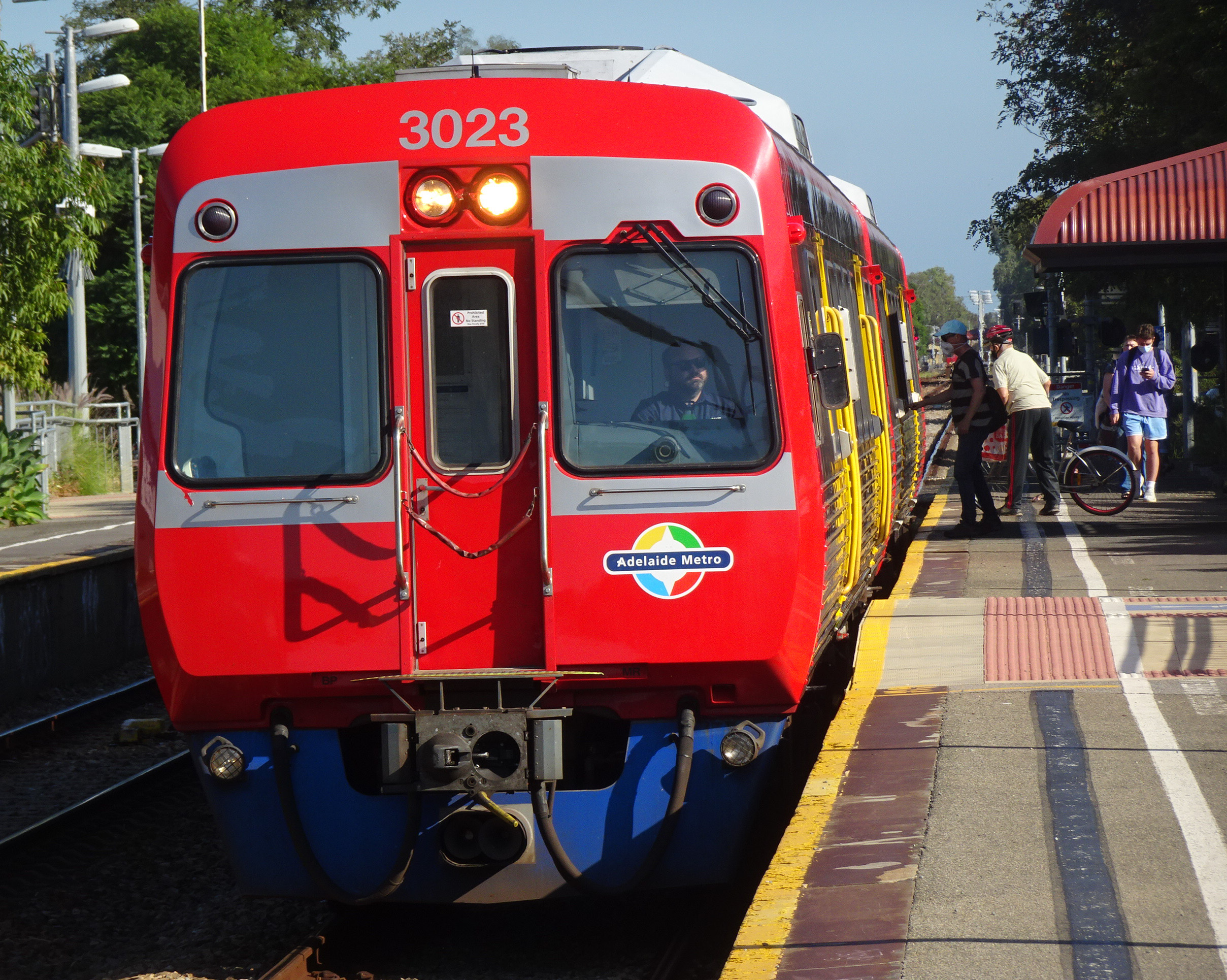
- Kilkenny railway station

- Country: Australia
- State: South Australia
- City: Adelaide
- LGA: City of Charles Sturt
- Location: 7.5 km (4.7 mi) NW of Adelaide city centre
- Established: 1849

Government
  - State electorate: Croydon (2012)
  - Federal division: Adelaide

Population
  - Total: 1,846 (SAL 2021)
- Postcode: 5009
Suburbs around Kilkenny
Woodville North	Woodville Gardens	Ferryden Park
Woodville Park	Kilkenny	Croydon Park
Beverley	Beverley	West Croydon

Kilkenny is an inner north-western suburb of Adelaide, South Australia, it is located in the City of Charles Sturt. It is named after Kilkenny, Ireland.

== History ==
Before the colonisation of South Australia in 1836, the land now called Kilkenny was occupied by the Kaurna people.

The suburb of Kilkenny was created by subdivision of section 388 of the Hundred of Yatala in 1849 and was known as the Township of Kilkenny. Section 388 was bounded on its north east by Torrens Road, indicating the historic township occupied only the southern half of the present suburb. The present-day boundaries of Kilkenny include the former suburb of Challa Gardens, created by subdivision of section 411E of the same hundred in 1950, which was also known as Woodville East and Kilkenny North prior to the 1950 subdivision.

The Austral Picture Palace, an existing building conversion designed by noted cinema architect Chris A. Smith, was built in 1922. It is not known when it closed.

== Geography ==
Kilkenny straddles Torrens Road where it joins with Regency Road. Kilkenny Road and David Terrace forms its western boundary.

== Demographics ==
The 2016 Census by the Australian Bureau of Statistics counted 1,660 persons in Kilkenny on census night. Of these, 49.7% were male and 50.3% were female.

The majority of residents (58.8%) are of Australian birth, with other common census responses being Vietnam (6.3%), Italy (3.9%), India (2.9%) Greece (2.3%) and England (2.0%).

The age distribution of Kilkenny residents is similar to that of the greater Australian population. 70.9% of residents were over 24 years in 2016, compared to the Australian average of 68.5%; and 28.1% were younger than 24 years, compared to the Australian average of 31.5%.

In terms of religious affiliation, 26.8% of residents identified as not religious, 24.8% identified as Catholic, 9.6% identified as Eastern Orthodox, and 4.7% identified as Buddhist. Within Kilkenny, 90.6% of the residents were employed, with the remaining 9.4% being unemployed.

== Politics ==
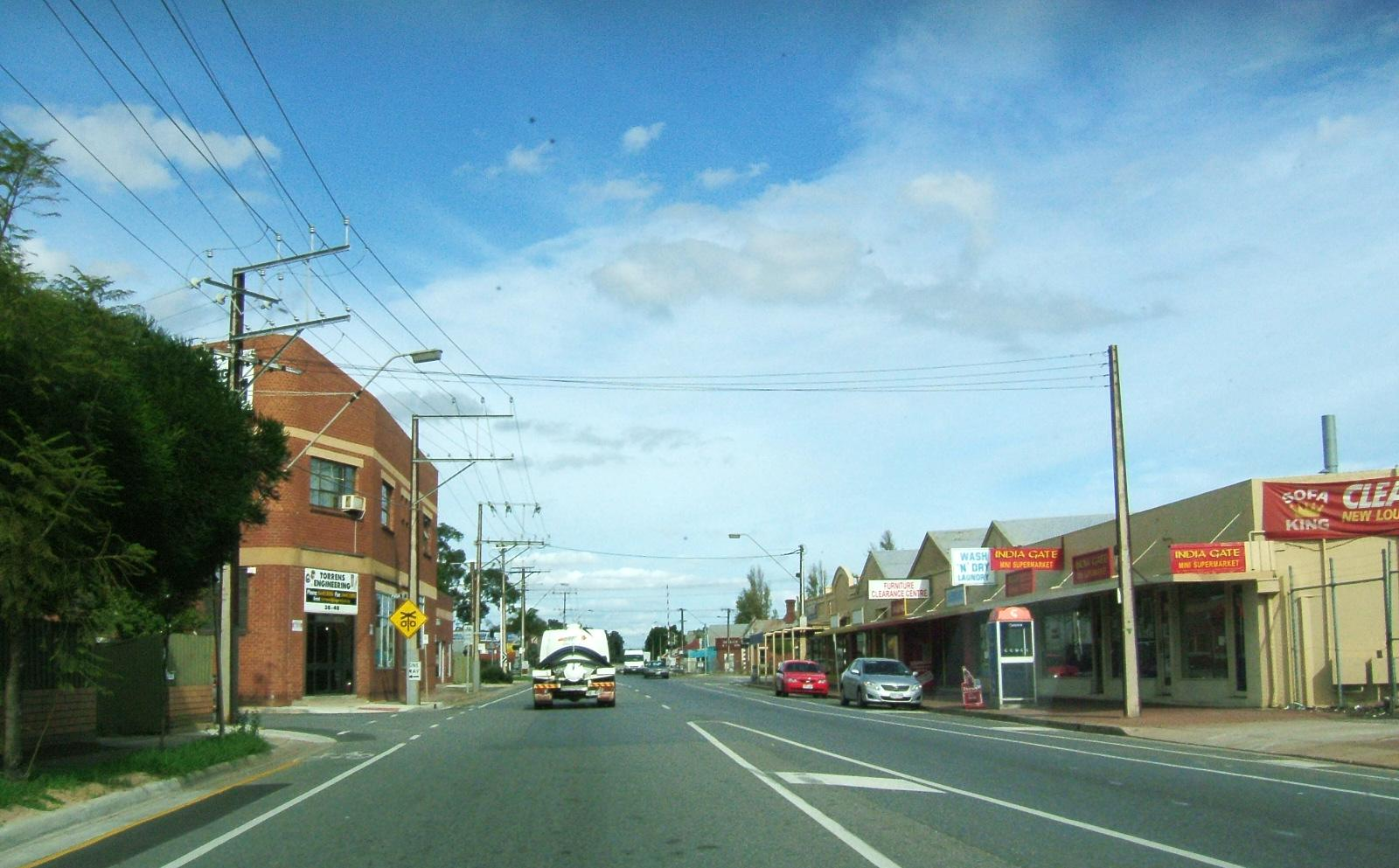
Looking south on David Terrace. Kilkenny is on the left.

=== Local government ===
Kilkenny is part of Hindmarsh Ward in the City of Charles Sturt local government area, with representative councillors, Labor members Paul Alexandrides and Alice Campbell.

=== State and federal ===
Kilkenny lies in the state electoral district of Croydon and the federal electoral division of Adelaide. The suburb is represented in the South Australian House of Assembly by leader of the South Australian opposition, Labor member Peter Malinauskas (Croydon), and federally by Steve Georganas.

== Community ==
The local suburban newspaper is the Weekly Times Messenger. Other regional and national newspapers such as The Advertiser and The Australian are also available.

== Community and Arts ==
There is an active community arts scene in Kilkenny, pursued through local arts community group Kilkenny Gorilla Art".

=== Schools ===
Challa Gardens Primary School is located on Humphries Terrace and Kilkenny Primary School is located in the adjacent suburb of West Croydon on Jane Street, just south west of Kilkenny.

== Facilities and attractions ==
=== Commerce ===
Armada Arndale is located on Torrens Road in the north of the suburb.

=== Parks ===
The main park in the suburb is Alton Reserve on Reynell Street. McInerny Reserve, in West Croydon, is accessible from Pinda and Mundulla streets.

=== Culture ===
Near the edge of Kilkenny, on Kilkenny road is the Spanish Club of SA, catering to the Spanish of South Australia.

== Community facilities ==
Minh Quang Meditation Hall, a Vietnamese Buddhist temple, is located in the suburb.

== Transportation ==
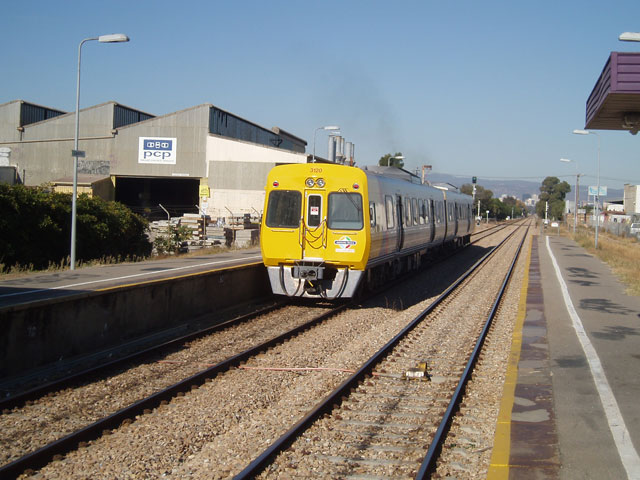
Kilkenny railway station

=== Roads ===
Kilkenny is serviced by Regency Road and Torrens Road, the latter of which connects the suburb to Adelaide city centre.

=== Public transport ===
Kilkenny is serviced by public transport run by the Adelaide Metro.

==== Trains ====
The Grange and Outer Harbor railway lines pass through the suburb. The closest station is Kilkenny.

==== Buses ====
The suburb is serviced by bus routes run by the Adelaide Metro.

== See also ==
- List of Adelaide suburbs
