= Mansfield Park, South Australia =

Coordinates: 34°51′07″S 138°32′49″E

Mansfield Park
- Suburb
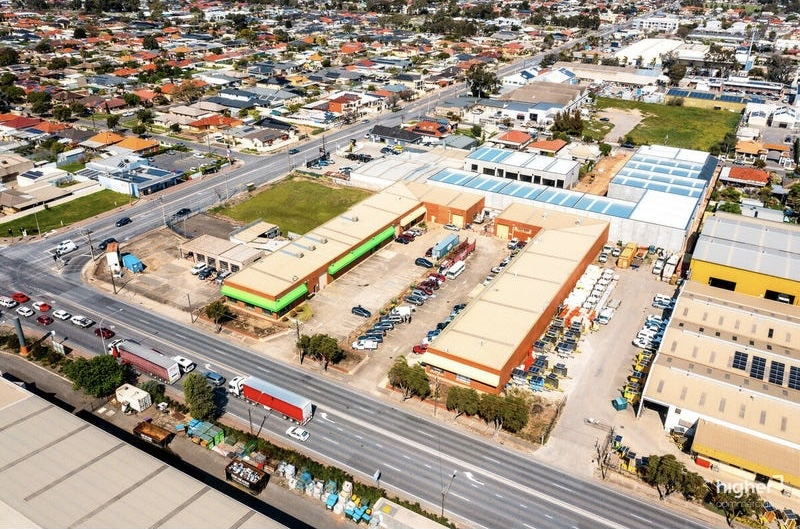
- Aerial shot of Athol Park and Mansfield Park with Hanson Road and Grand Junction Road in view
- Interactive map of Mansfield Park
- Country: Australia
- State: South Australia
- City: Adelaide
- LGA: City of Port Adelaide Enfield

Government
  - State electorate: Croydon
  - Federal division: Adelaide

Area
  - Total: 1.16 km^{2} (0.45 sq mi)

Population
  - Total: 4,608 (SAL 2021)
- Postcode: 5012
Suburbs around Mansfield Park
Ottoway	Wingfield	Wingfield
Athol Park	Mansfield Park	Angle Park
Woodville North	Woodville Gardens	Ferryden Park

Mansfield Park is a north-western suburb of Adelaide 10 km (6.2 mi) from the CBD, in the state of South Australia, Australia and falls under the City of Port Adelaide Enfield. It is adjacent to Wingfield, Angle Park, Woodville Gardens, and Athol Park. The postcode for Mansfield Park is 5012. It is bounded to the north by Grand Junction Road, and to the west by Hanson Road. It is named after Mansfield in East Ayrshire, Scotland.

Mansfield Park also has one of the largest migrant populations in Adelaide, with over 50% of the suburb being foreign-born.

== History ==
Prior to the Second World War, Mansfield Park mainly consisted of pastures and open land. Its development as a residential area coincided with the post-war boom in the 1950s. It is home to a large number of houses owned by the former South Australian Housing Trust (now Housing SA). In 1965, a council library was opened in Hamley Crescent, but it was relocated in 1978 to the newly established Parks Community Centre in 1978. In the 1990s, plans were made for the Westwood Urban Renewal project, of which Ferryden Park, Angle Park, Woodville Gardens, and Athol Park are also a part. This involved the demolition of many of the Housing Trust homes, which were to be replaced by either private housing, or a lesser number of townhouse-style new housing trust homes. The building began in 2001 but, as September 2012 most work has occurred in Mansfield Park to replace trusted houses with new ones. There are still 100+ houses / lands being constructed/developed.

== Urban renewal ==
In 2009, The Westwood Consortium (consisting of Urban Pacific, City of Charles Sturt Council, City of Port Adelaide Enfield Council, and the Government of South Australia) began releasing stage three of its urban renewal project. The project centres around the large public nature strip between Gateshead Street and Ely Street, which the latest stage gives its namesake to, "Central Park".

This is the final stage of the Westwood Urban Renewal project, which is the largest of its kind in Australia. It involves the demolition of most of the South Australian Housing Trust units, in its place new medium-density housing.

== Facilities ==
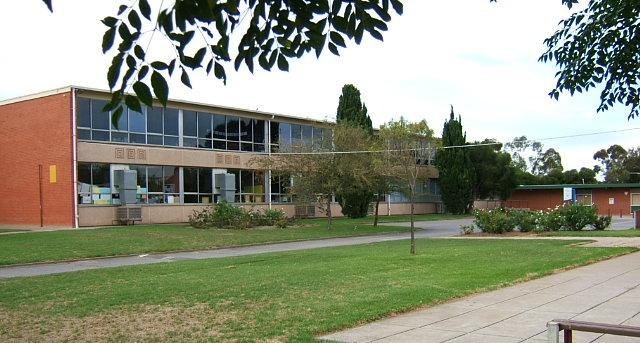
Mansfield Park Primary School

There is one primary school in the area, being the Catholic St Patrick's School. It has around 300-400 students. There is a small shopping complex at the corner of Trafford and Wilson Streets, and the Parks Community Centre, adjacent in Angle Park, provides a health centre, gym and fitness centre, swimming complex, council office, and a few other community services. It was also the site of the Parks High School which was closed at the end of 1996 due to declining enrolments. The local zone high school is Woodville High School, in Woodville. A large number of the families in the area choose to send their children to other schools, mainly in the city centre, which was one of the causes of the closure of the Parks High School.

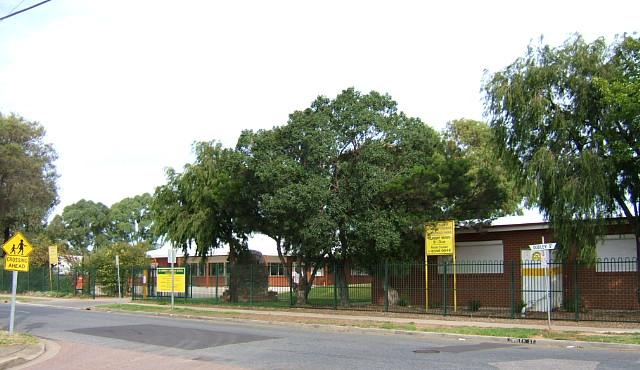
St Patrick's Primary School

A drive-in cinema between Short Street and Grand Junction Road was closed in the 1980s, and replaced with a retirement village.

There was also a Salvation Army church on Trafford Street, which has closed and was bought by an outlawed motorcycle club (Hells Angels), and subsequently fortified.

== Transport ==
Hanson Road is served by the 253 and 254 and the 253X and 254X express bus services with N254 Night Services for Saturday. Medika Boulevard and Trafford Streets are served by the 251 and 252 services, while the 361 serve Grand Junction Road.

== Demographics ==
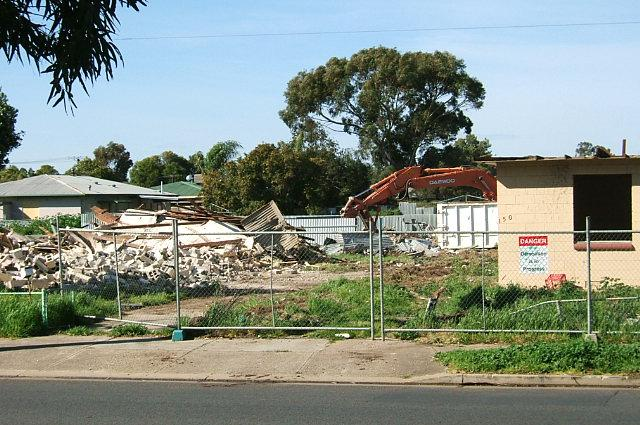
Demolition of Housing Trust homes

Mansfield Park is home to a large immigrant population. The initial settlement of the suburb coincided with a large wave of immigrants from Eastern Europe arriving in Australia, following the Second World War. Although most of their children have moved on, a large number of immigrant retirees still live in the area. This is reflected in the decline of students attending local primary schools, with 702 students attending Mansfield Park Primary School at its peak in 1966. Another wave of immigration occurred in the 1980s, when Vietnamese immigrants arrived after the Vietnam War. Currently September 2012, more than 50% of the population is from a non-English speaking background.

== Politics ==
Mansfield Park is located within the federal seat of Adelaide. It is the most pro-Australian Labor Party area in South Australia, recording the highest two-party-preferred vote in the state for the ALP at the Mansfield Park Primary School booth at the 1998, 2001 and 2004 federal elections, garnering more than 80% on each occasion.
