= Woodville North, South Australia =

Woodville North
- Suburb
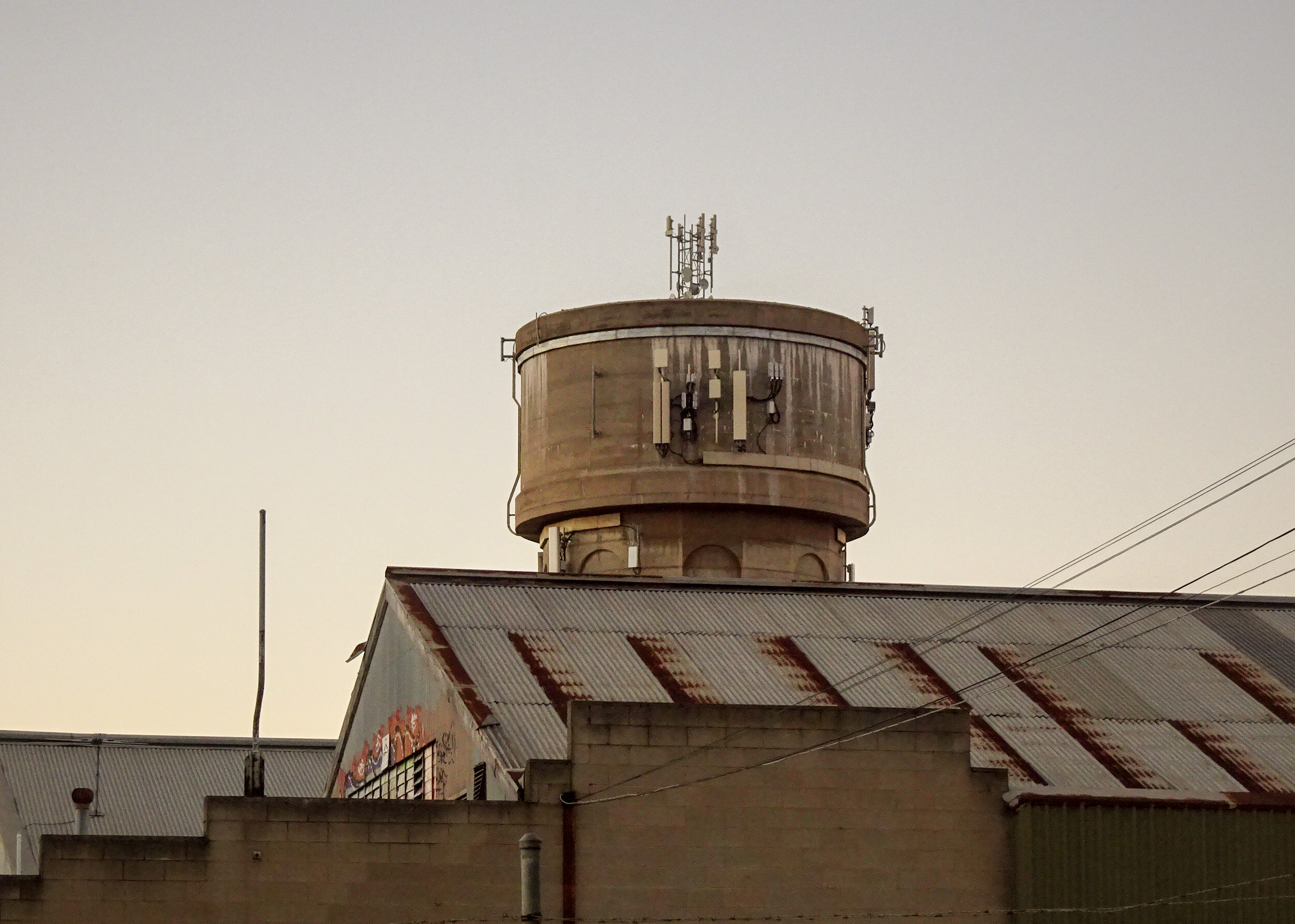
- Waterco Water Tower, Torrens Road.

- Interactive map of Woodville North
- Country: Australia
- State: South Australia
- City: Adelaide
- LGA: City of Charles Sturt
- Location: 9 km (5.6 mi) from Adelaide GPO

Government
  - State electorate: Cheltenham
  - Federal division: Hindmarsh

Population
  - Total: 2,721 (SAL 2021)
- Postcode: 5012
Suburbs around Woodville North
Pennington	Athol Park	Mansfield Park
Cheltenham	Woodville North	Woodville Gardens
Cheltenham	Woodville	Woodville Park, Kilkenny

Woodville North is a north-western suburb of Adelaide 10 km from the Adelaide city centre, in the state of South Australia, Australia and falls under the City of Charles Sturt. The post code for Woodville North is 5012. It is adjacent to Pennington, Athol Park, Woodville Gardens, Mansfield Park, Woodville and Kilkenny. It is bordered to the east by Hanson Road to the west by Carlton Crescent, to the south by Torrens Road and to the north by Hamilton Road. The suburb is residential, apart from an industrial pocket to the northwest.

== Facilities ==
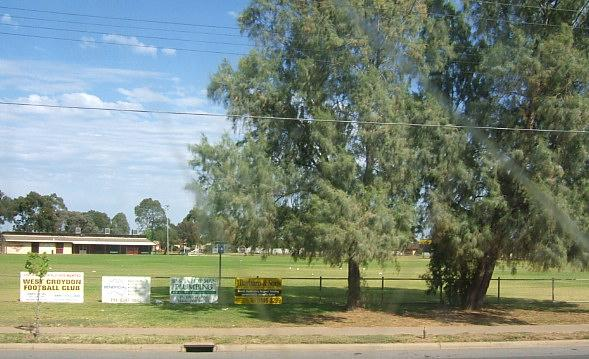
Fawkner Reserve

There is no primary school in the area; the nearest are the public Pennington Primary School, the R-2 campus of Pennington Junior Primary School, and Ridley Grove Primary School in the adjacent suburbs of Pennington and Woodville Gardens. Currently, the local zone high school is Woodville High School, in Woodville. There are a few shops and medical practices on Hanson Road, but the closest shopping centre is the Arndale Shopping Centre. The Finsbury Reserve on Park Avenue provides a venue for recreation. The al-Khalil mosque on Torrens Road provides a facility for Islamic worship.

Quan Am Temple, a Vietnamese Buddhist temple, is located in the suburb.

== History ==
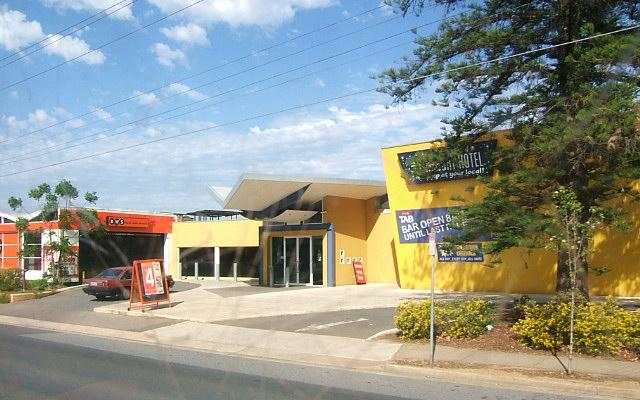
Finsbury Hotel, Hanson Road in 2006.

The southern pocket of Woodville North, historically called Finsbury Park, used to be a much stronger and active industrial area, with a Government Supply Depot for military purposes operating in the area during the Second World War, which was the basis for the existence of a railway line and station that is now the location of an Islamic mosque, it was not until the outbreak of World War II that building commenced on this land, which was mostly vacant, that the name of Finsbury so named after the London suburb, became well known as a manufacturing centre of munitions. The commonwealth government already had plans for making munitions in South Australia when war broke out in 1939.

The site comprised some 108 acres of the Finsbury area and some of the Cheltenham gardens area, with the co-operation of the state government and a host of private companies an area of 28 acres was under roof and full services of gas mains, electricity, water, sewerage and roads completed by November 1940. The next five years showed huge production figures of items which were used at Hendon and also at the big filling factory at Salisbury. These factories were working three shifts around the clock and the employees for Hendon and Finsbury combined totalled over 3000, the majority being women.

Woodville North Post Office opened on 14 February 1966. An earlier office of the same name was renamed Kilkenny North in 1964.

== Transport ==
Hanson Road is served by the 253, 254 and the 253X & 254X express bus services. Torrens Road is served by the 230, 232 and 100 services. Park Avenue is served by the 252 service. The Finsbury railway line used to run parallel to Audley Street, mainly to service the industrial activity in the area, but this was removed in 1979 due to the industrial decline. Finsbury railway station occupied the site of the al-Khalil mosque. Woodville North railway station was a freight only station.

== Demographics ==
Woodville North is home to a large immigrant population. The initial settlement of the suburb coincided with a large wave of immigrants from Eastern Europe following the Second World War. Another wave of immigration occurred in the 1980s, when Vietnamese immigrants arrived after the Vietnam War.
