= Wingfield, South Australia =

Wingfield
- Suburb
- Coordinates: 34.842°S 138.564°E
- Country: Australia
- State: South Australia
- City: Adelaide
- LGA: City of Port Adelaide Enfield
- Established: 1877

Government
  - State electorate: Electoral district of Port Adelaide
  - Federal divisions: Hindmarsh; Makin

Population
  - Total: 440 (SAL 2021)
- Postcode: 5013
Suburbs around Wingfield
Gillman		Dry Creek
Ottoway	Wingfield
Athol Park, Mansfield Park	Angle Park	Regency Park, Kilburn

Wingfield is a suburb situated north of Adelaide. It lies between the Port River Expressway on the north and Grand Junction Road on the south. The suburb borders Dry Creek to its north and east, bounded by the Gawler railway line and Adelaide-Port Augusta railway line on the east. The North-South Motorway and Dry Creek-Port Adelaide railway line both cross the suburb. Wingfield is named after R. W. Wingfield, the private secretary to Governor of South Australia, William Jervois.

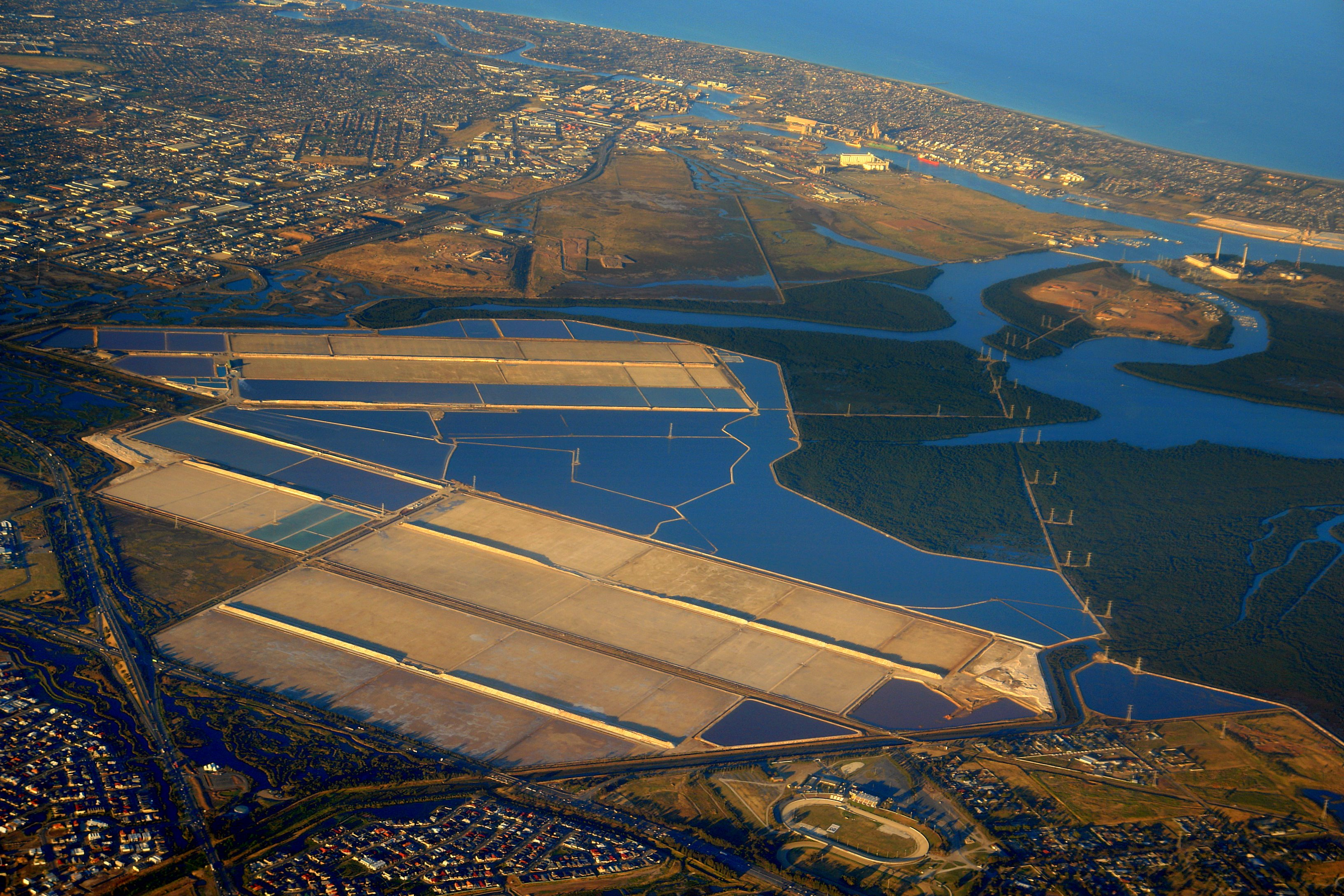
Wingfield and the surrounding areas

== Government ==
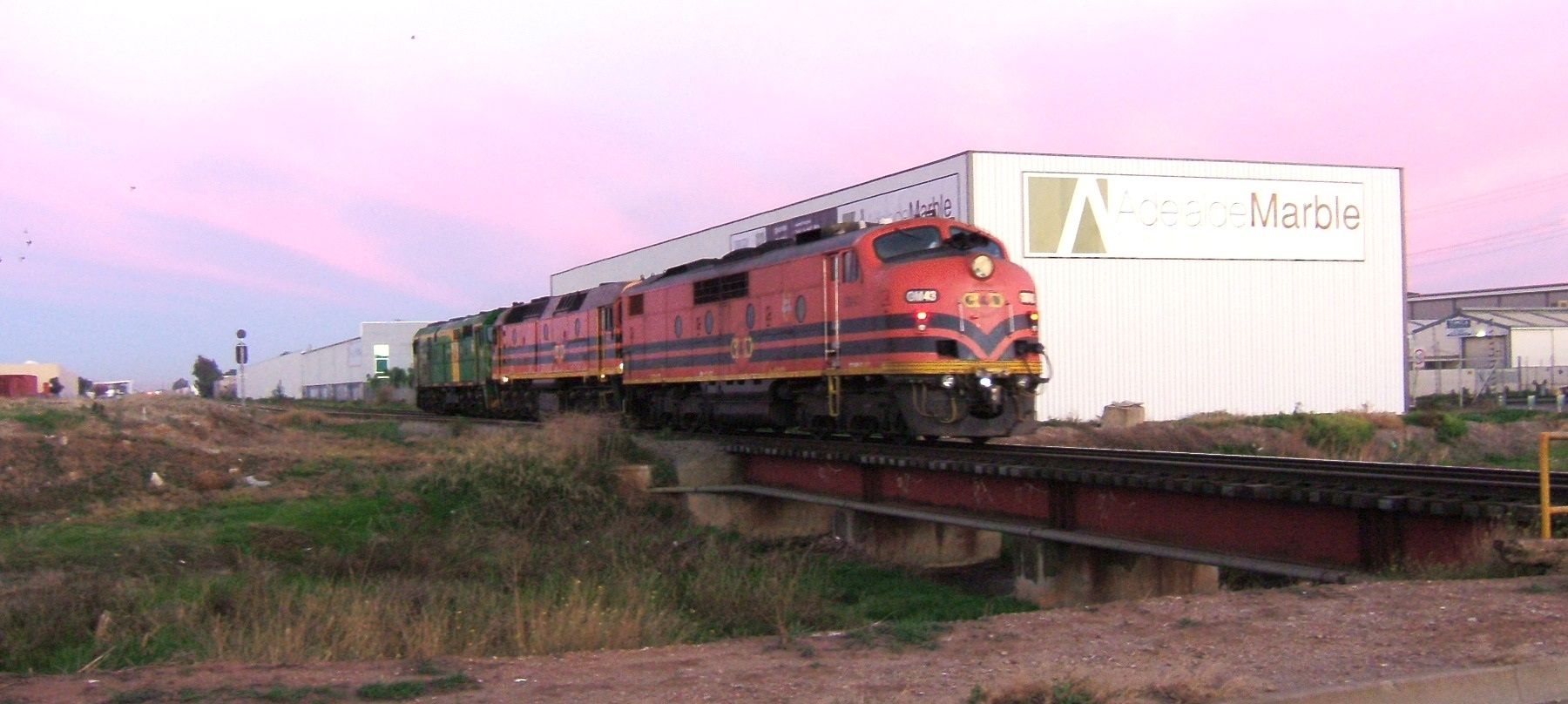
Freight train in Wingfield

The suburb is in the City of Port Adelaide Enfield local government area.

== Major industries ==
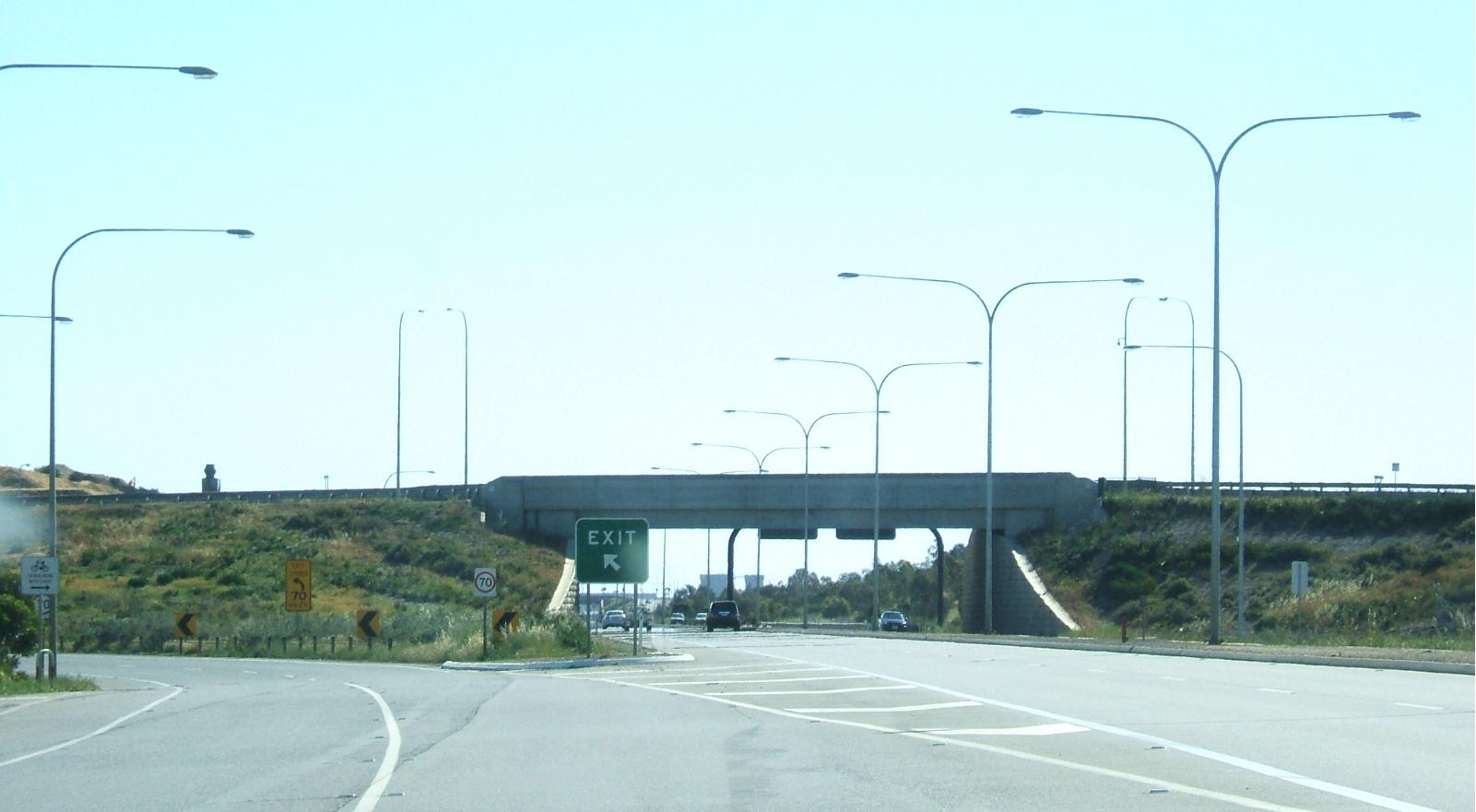
Intersection of Port River Expressway and South Road, looking west along the Port River Expressway, 2008.

The southwestern corner of the suburb includes residential housing, but most of the suburb is industrial. Industry includes recycling, manufacturing and freight forwarding.

=== Waste and resource recovery ===
Wingfield is the site of the 94ha Wingfield Waste & Recycling Centre (commonly known as the Wingfield Tip or Wingfield Dump), formerly owned and operated by the Adelaide City Council, and now operated as a "collaborative cluster of commercial businesses" including Orora, Adelaide Resource Recovery, Jeffries Group and Transpacific Industries. Between 1952 and 2004, the Wingfield site was operated as a landfill dump. Since 2004, it has become a waste and recycling transfer centre, with all waste being sorted into recyclable products or waste products. The waste is compacted and transferred to other landfill sites north of Adelaide, at Dublin and Inkerman.

== Motorsport ==
Wingfield is home to Australia's only dedicated junior Motorcycle speedway track, the Sidewinders Speedway located at the Wingfield Reserve on Eighth Street adjacent to the Wingfield Tip. The 112 metres (122 yd) long track was opened in 1978 by the Sidewinders U/16 Speedway Club which had formed in 1976.
