= Athol Park, South Australia =

Athol Park
- Suburb
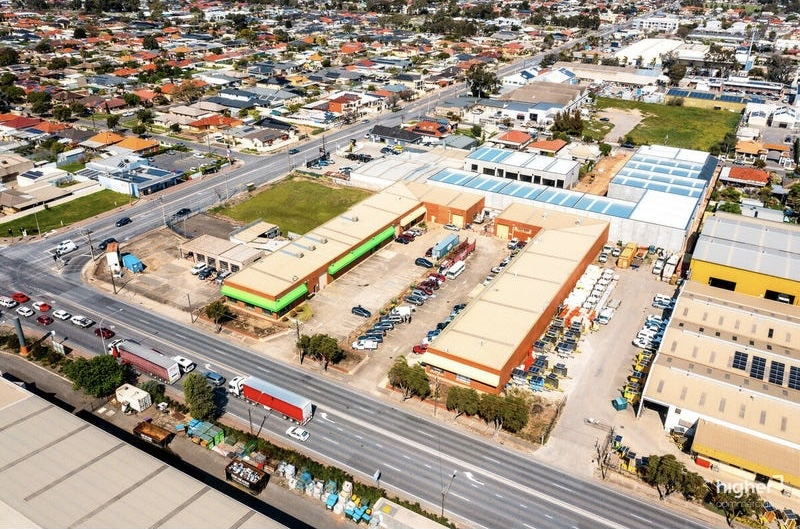
- Aerial shot of Athol Park and Mansfield Park with Hanson Road and Grand Junction Road in view

- Interactive map of Athol Park
- Country: Australia
- State: South Australia
- City: Adelaide
- LGA: City of Charles Sturt
- Location: 9.2 km (5.7 mi) NW of Adelaide city centre

Government
  - State electorate: Croydon
  - Federal division: Hindmarsh

Area
  - Total: 0.9 km^{2} (0.35 sq mi)

Population
  - Total: 2,023 (SAL 2021)
- Postcode: 5012
Suburbs around Athol Park
Ottoway	Ottoway	Wingfield
Pennington	Athol Park	Mansfield Park
Woodville North	Woodville North	Woodville Gardens

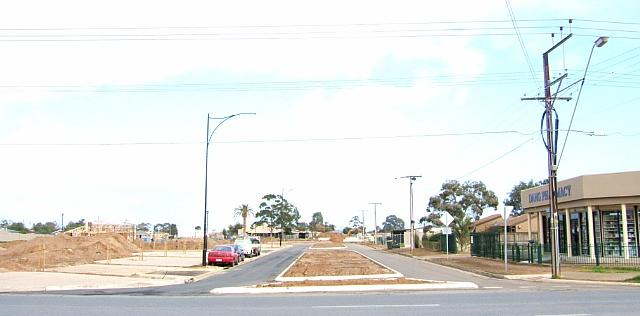
Redeveloped entrance to Athol Park, which replaced Housing Trust homes.

Athol Park is a north-western suburb of Adelaide, South Australia, it is located in the City of Charles Sturt. The suburb is named after Atholl, a district of Perth, Scotland.

Athol Park has one of the largest migrant population percentages in Adelaide, with over 50% of the suburb being foreign-born.

== Geography ==
The suburb lies at the western end of Grand Junction Road, which also forms its northern boundary. It is bordered to the west by Glenroy Street, to the east by Hanson Rd, with Hamilton Road forming the bulk of its southern boundary. The southern portion of Athol Park is residential with a light industrial area in the north.

The suburb is home to a large number of Housing Trust homes. In the 1990s, plans were made for the Westwood Urban Renewal project, of which Ferryden Park, Angle Park, Woodville Gardens, and Mansfield Park were also a part. This involved replacing the Housing Trust homes with either private housing or a new townhouse-style housing trust homes.

== Demographics ==
The 2021 Census by the Australian Bureau of Statistics counted 2,023 persons in Athol Park on census night. Of these, 1,013 were male and 1,002 were female.

The most common countries of birth were Australia (44.4%), Vietnam (18.7%), India (5.6%) and the Philippines (4.4%).

The most common languages used at home were English only (33%), Vietnamese (26.1%), Punjabi (2.5%), Serbian (2.5%) and Tagalog (2.4%). Other languages used at home by 30 or more residents were Malayalam, Mandarin, Cantonese and Filipino.

54 people (2.7%) identified as Aboriginal and/or Torres Strait Islander.

The age distribution of Athol Park residents is younger than that of the Australian population as a whole. At the 2021 Census, 33.1% of Athol Park residents were aged 24 years or younger (Australia: 30.2%), and 11.8% were aged 65 years or older (Australia: 17.2%).

== Politics ==
=== Local government ===
Athol Park is part of Woodville Ward in the local government area of the City of Charles Sturt. Athol Park is represented on Council by Senthil Chidambaranathan.

=== State and federal ===
Athol Park lies in the state electoral district of Cheltenham and the federal electoral division of Hindmarsh. The suburb is represented in the South Australian House of Assembly by Joe Szakacs and federally by Mark Butler.

== Facilities and attractions ==
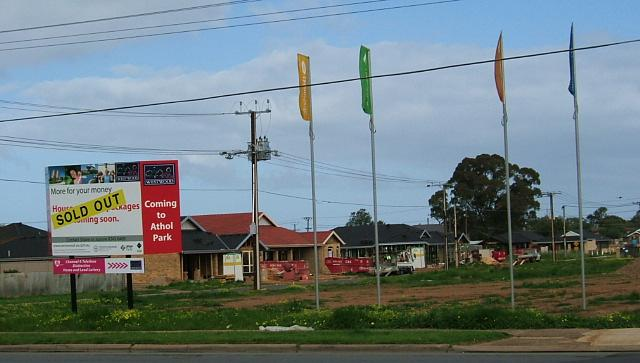
Redevelopment of land and housing in Athol Park

=== Parks ===
Fawk Reserve, which contains the Athol Park Community Garden, is located on Hanson Road.

There is also green space between Ely and Gateshead streets.

== Transportation ==
=== Roads ===
Athol Park is serviced by Hanson Road, and Grand Junction Road, which forms its eastern boundary.

=== Public transport ===
Buses

Athol Park is serviced by bus routes 252, 253, 254, N254 and 361 by the Adelaide Metro.

==== Trains ====
The Finsbury railway line used to run parallel to Glenroy Street, mainly to facilitate the industrial activity in the area. This was removed in 1979 due to industrial decline.

== See also ==
- List of Adelaide suburbs
