= Woodville Gardens School =

Location
- 18-58 Ridley Grove; Woodville Gardens, Adelaide, South Australia, 5012; Australia
- Coordinates: 34.8633°S 138.5510°E

Information
- Type: State primary day school
- Religious affiliation: Non-denominational
- Established: 2011
- Authority: Department for Education (South Australia)
- Principal: Kristian Mundy
- Head teacher: Chris Stepien (Early years); Scott Foale (Primary years)
- Year levels: Birth - Year 6
- Gender: Coeducational
- Enrolment: 478 (August 2025)
- Campus type: Suburban
- Colours: Purple; Teal; Navy
- Website: www.wgs.sa.edu.au

Woodville Gardens School is a public coeducational primary school, located in the Adelaide suburb of Woodville Gardens (South Australia, Australia). It is administered by the South Australian Department for Education. The school falls within the "Parks" ward of the City of Port Adelaide Enfield council area.

== History ==
Woodville Gardens School was created as a result of a merger between five schools, i.e. Ferryden Park Primary School, Ridley Grove Junior Primary School, Mansfield Park Primary School, Woodville Gardens Preschool, and Parks Children's Centre. The merger occurred as part of the Education Works New Schools Project of the Department of Education and Children's Services, which resulted in the school's lands being earmarked for new housing development. Woodville Gardens School was built on the Ridley Grove site of one of the schools involved in the merger, Ridley Grove Junior Primary School, which was established in 1949 but closed in 1994.

The Woodville Gardens School council was officially established under the Education Act 1972 (SA), s85(1)(a) on 30 September 2010. Woodville Gardens School was opened on 31 January 2011.

== Administration ==
As of 2025, the school has a teaching staff of 44 (39.2 full-time equivalent) and non-teaching staff of 39 (23.0 full-time equivalent).

The first principal of the school was Frank Cairns. The current principal is Kristian Mundy.

Prior Principals
Principal	Years			
Principal	Initial	Ref	Final	Ref
Kristian Mundy	2025		Current	
Scott Foale (Acting)	2023		2024	
Sue Charleston	2022		2023	
Fiona Voigt	2016		2021	
Marg Clark (Acting)†	2015		2015	
Frank Cairns	2010		2015	

† Marg Clark, the then Head of School Primary Years, was an acting Principal during 2015.

== Students ==
=== Child Care Centre ===
On the school premises is a Children’s Centre catering for birth to school age, with a curriculum based on the Early Years Learning Framework, targeting children aged 12 weeks to school age entry.

=== General Enrolment ===
As a whole, Woodville Gardens School teaches students from Birth to Year 6. The trends in enrolment have been:

Student enrolment trends
Year	Boys	Girls	Total	Ref				
Year	Boys	Girls	Total	Ref	2011	329	273	602
2012	323	284	607					
2013	317	303	620					
2014	287	303	590					
2015	297	287	584					
2016	285	292	577					
2017	283	285	568					
2018	285	276	561					
2019	280	272	552					
2020	275	277	552					
2021	262	247	509					
2022	234	188	422					
2023	239	203	442					
2024	234	230	464					
2025	242	236	478					
2026	TBA	TBA	TBA					

=== Multiculturalism ===
These are some of the statistics on the school's indigenous students and those students with a language background other than English (LBOTE):

Multicultural Composition
Year	Indigenous (%)	LBOTE (%)	Ref
2014	11	63	
2015	10	65	
2016	11	62	
2017	12	64	
2018	12	61	
2019	11	67	
2020	11	66	
2021	10	66	
2022	10	65	
2023	9	71	
2024	9	72	
2025	9	72	
2025	N/A	N/A	

== See also ==
- Education in South Australia
- List of schools in South Australia
- Lists of schools in Australia
