= Woodville Gardens, South Australia =

Woodville Gardens
- Suburb
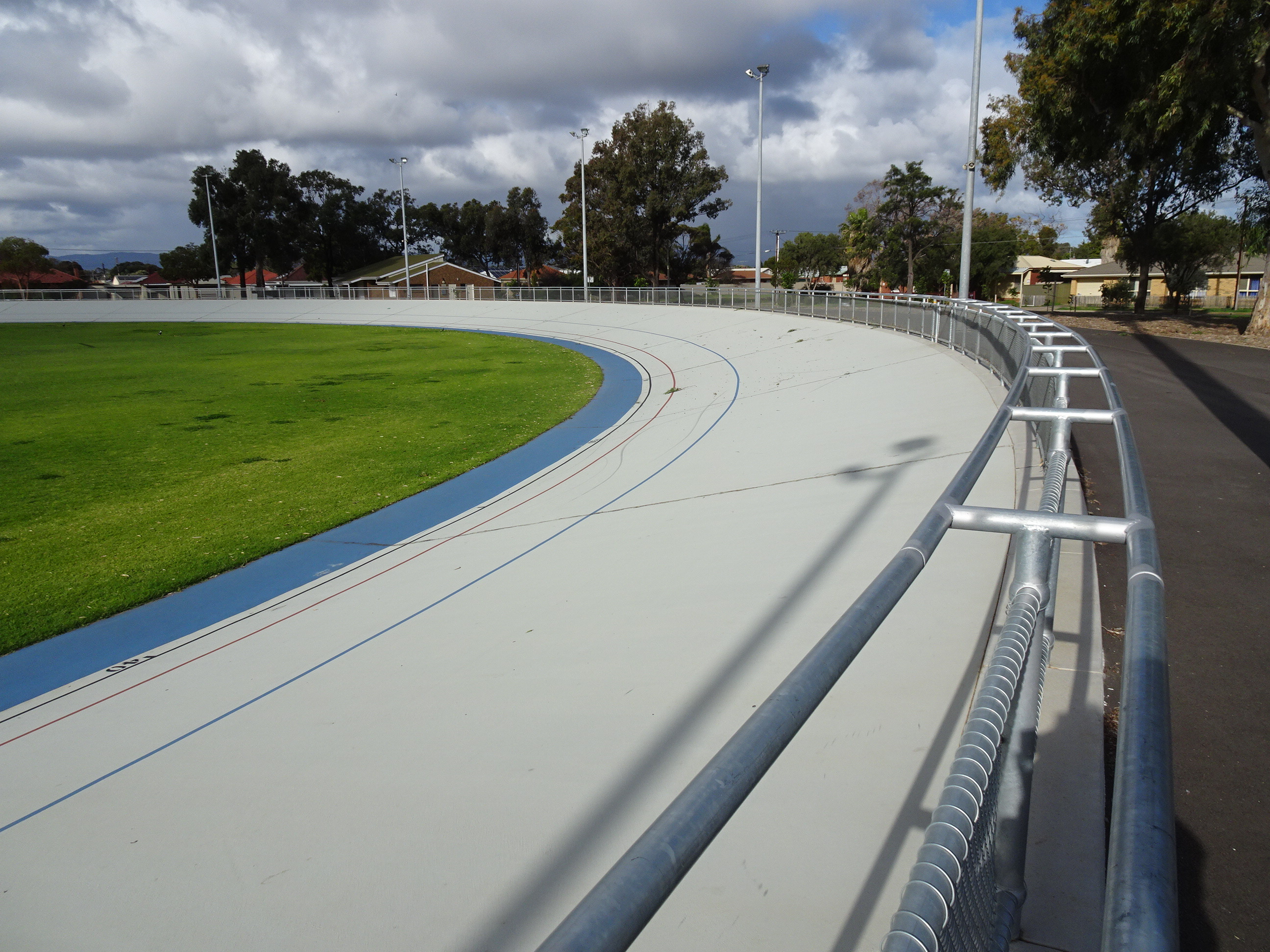
- Velodrome, Woodville Gardens

- Interactive map of Woodville Gardens
- Country: Australia
- State: South Australia
- City: Adelaide
- LGA: City of Port Adelaide Enfield
- Location: 9 km (5.6 mi) NW of Adelaide city centre
- Established: 1947

Government
  - State electorate: Croydon (2018) Cheltenham (2011)
  - Federal division: Adelaide

Area
  - Total: 0.86 km^{2} (0.33 sq mi)

Population
  - Total: 2,412 (SAL 2021)
- Postcode: 5012
Suburbs around Woodville Gardens
Athol Park	Mansfield Park	Angle Park
Woodville North	Woodville Gardens	Ferryden Park
Woodville	Kilkenny	Ferryden Park

Woodville Gardens is a north-western suburb of Adelaide 9 km from the CBD, in the state of South Australia, Australia and falls under the City of Port Adelaide Enfield. It is adjacent to Woodville North, Mansfield Park, Ferryden Park, and Kilkenny. The post code for Woodville Gardens is 5012. It is bounded to the south by First Avenue, and to the east by Liberty Grove, and to the west by Hanson Road.

Woodville Gardens also has one of the largest migrant populations in Adelaide, with over 50% of the suburb being foreign-born.

== History ==
Prior to the Second World War, Woodville Gardens mainly consisted of pastures, and open land. Its development as a residential area coincided with the post-war boom in the 1950s. The Woodville Gardens Post Office opened on 2 June 1947 and was replaced by the Ferryden Park office in 1993. It is home to a large number of houses owned by the South Australian Housing Trust. Many of the private houses were financed with war service loans from government. From being a solidly working class suburb, mainly Anglo-Australian, with employment opportunities in the near-by Actil, General Motors Holden and other factories, new immigration changed the ethnic character from the 1970s. In the 1990s, plans were made for the Westwood Urban Renewal project, of which Ferryden Park, Mansfield Park, Angle Park, and Athol Park are also a part. This involved the demolition of many of the Housing Trust homes, to be replaced by either private housing, or a lesser number of newer, townhouse-style housing trust homes. The building began in 2001, and as of 2003, began to affect the eastern part of Woodville Gardens.

== Facilities ==
There is one primary school in the area, being the public Woodville Gardens B7 School. Ridley Grove Primary School was established in 1950 and closed in 2010 after a merger with Ferryden Park Primary School to form the Woodville Gardens school. There are many medical, pharmaceutical and Asian grocery and restaurants along Hanson Road. The Amanda Arndale shopping centre in adjacent Kilkenny is the main shopping facility in the area. The nearby Parks Community Centre, in Angle Park also provides a library, health centre, gym and fitness centre, swimming complex, council office, and a few other community services. It was also site of the Parks High School, which was closed at the end of 1996, due to declining enrolments. Currently, the local zone high school is Woodville High School, in Woodville. However, a large number of the families in the area choose to send their children to other schools, mainly in the city centre, which was one of the causes of the closure of the Parks High School. There is one small park in the area called, Mikawomma Reserve.

There is an outdoor velodrome located in Woodville Gardens, which was opened in 1929 by the Kilkenny Amateur Cycling Club, leading to the construction of the banked arena in 1932. It also became the home of the Woodville Professional cycling club, and at one stage the facility was used by Arn Bate and Dean Toseland, the national mile and 10-mile champions respectively. It was also where former Australian track cycling coach Charlie Walsh began his involvement in cycling. The world and Olympic champion cyclist Stuart O'Grady trained there in his youth.

== Transport ==
Liberty Grove is served by the 250, 251 and 252 services, while the First Avenue is served by the 239, 250, 251, 252 services. The 253, 253X, 254, 254X service Hanson Road.

== Demographics and social history ==
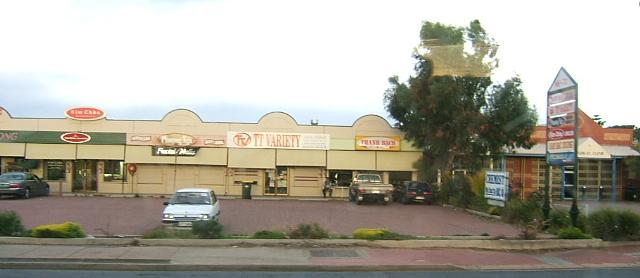
Shop outlets on Hanson Road in 2006.

Woodville Gardens is home to a large immigrant population. The initial settlement of the suburb coincided with a large wave of immigrants from Eastern Europe arriving in Australia, following the Second World War. The South Australian Housing Trust built large numbers of homes in the area. As a result of the industries established in the 1940s and 1950s the population was mainly working class in character. Being a new suburb in the immediate post-World War II period, the baby boom was very apparent. With de-industrialisation from the 1980s, the mean age of the population grew older and unemployment grew. Most of the children of immigrants have moved on, leaving a large number of immigrant retirees still living in the area. This is reflected in the peak enrolment at Ridley Grove Primary School, which peaked at 880 in 1961. The essay by Campbell in the reference list below evokes the character of the suburb in the 1950s. There was another wave of immigration in the 1980s, when Vietnamese immigrants arrived after the Vietnam War. Currently, more than 50% of the population is from a non-English speaking background.

== Politics ==
Woodville Gardens is located within the federal seat of Adelaide. It is one of the most pro-Australian Labor Party localities in South Australia, recording two-party-preferred votes for the ALP at the Ridley Grove Primary School booth at the 1998, 2001 and 2004 federal elections of more than 70% on each occasion.

== See also ==
- Ferryden Park, South Australia
