= Ottoway, South Australia =

Ottoway
- Suburb
- Coordinates: 34°50′48″S 138°32′08″E
- Country: Australia
- State: South Australia
- City: Adelaide
- LGA: City of Port Adelaide Enfield
- Location: 2.5 km (1.6 mi) E of Port Adelaide; 12 km (7.5 mi) NW of Adelaide city centre

Government
  - State electorate: Port Adelaide
  - Federal division: Hindmarsh

Population
  - Total: 2,783 (SAL 2021)
- Postcode: 5013
Suburbs around Ottoway
Gillman		Wingfield
	Ottoway
Rosewater	Pennington, Athol Park	Mansfield Park

Ottoway is an industrial suburb of Adelaide, South Australia, in the City of Port Adelaide Enfield local government area. It is around 12 km (7 mi) west-northwest of the city centre. Ottoway's northern and western boundaries lie mainly along the Dry Creek-Port Adelaide railway line, and Grand Junction Road forms the suburb's southern boundary. The Port River Expressway also goes through this suburb.

== History ==
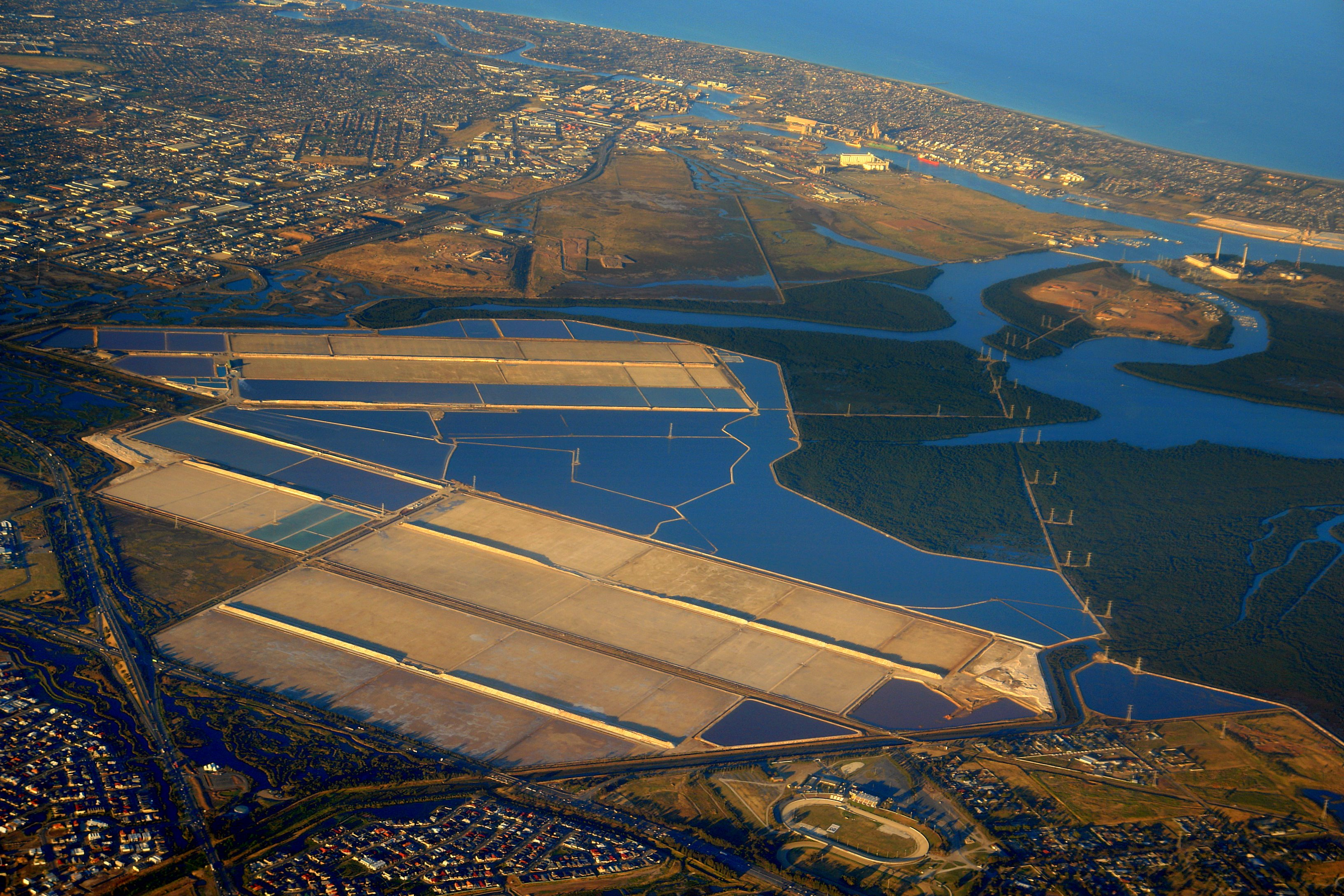
Ottoway and the surrounding areas

The suburb was laid out on section 1160 of the Hundred of Port Adelaide, the grant of which was in 1851 secured by one George Dale. When the land was subdivided in 1883, the surveyors and vendors Ferry, Moore & Wallmann named the suburb "Ottoway".

Geoff Manning, in his Place Names of South Australia, idiosyncratically gives the spelling "Ottaway", and gives as its derivation the publican Thomas Finch Ottaway (c. 1816 – 21 July 1867), who in 1853 purchased the land from George Dale.

== Facilities ==
The Catholic Church in the suburb is dedicated to Saint Maximilian Kolbe. Services are celebrated in English, Polish and Vietnamese.
