= Pennington, South Australia =

Pennington
- Suburb
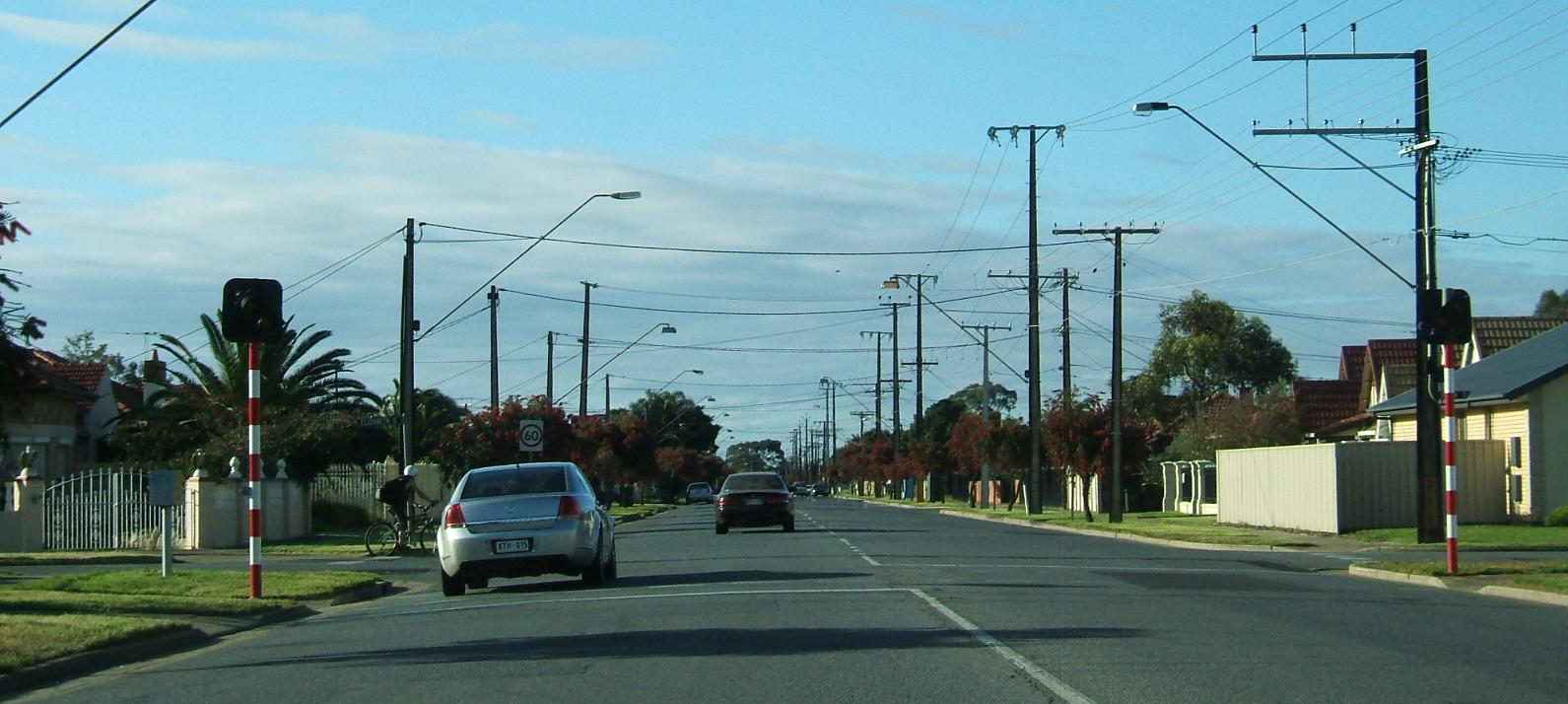
- Addison Road

- Interactive map of Pennington
- Country: Australia
- State: South Australia
- City: Adelaide
- LGA: City of Charles Sturt
- Location: 10 km (6.2 mi) from Adelaide
- Established: 1909

Government
  - State electorate: Cheltenham
  - Federal division: Hindmarsh

Population
  - Total: 3,773 (SAL 2021)
- Postcode: 5013
Suburbs around Pennington
Ottoway	Ottoway	Ottoway
Rosewater	Pennington	Athol Park
Cheltenham	St Clair	Woodville North

Pennington is a northern suburb of Adelaide, South Australia, located about 10 km from the Adelaide city centre, it is located in the City of Charles Sturt. The suburb is named after Pennington, the name of several areas in England.

The suburb is residential, apart from a light industrial pocket to the south.

== History ==
The area now including Pennington was subdivided in 1909 by Captain Alfred Hodgeman, who named a section after his wife, the former Helen Pennington. The Pennington Post Office opened on 1 May 1939 and closed in 1997.

Pennington was the site of a migrant hostel from 1950 until it closed in 1985. It was known as Finsbury Hostel from 1949 to 1966, then renamed to Pennington. It initially consisted of Nissen huts, Romney huts and Quonset huts, mostly second hand Army surplus. The huts provided dormitory and family accommodation, with separate dining, recreation and latrine buildings. Despite official closure, accommodation continued for migrants up to the mid-1990s.

Pennington was previously named Cheltenham Gardens.

== Demographics ==
The 2021 Census by the Australian Bureau of Statistics counted 3,773 persons in Pennington on census night. Of these, 49.1% were male and 50.9% were female).

24.4% of residents have English ancestry, 23.6% Australian and 13.4% Vietnamese.

The age distribution of Pennington residents (median age 41) is comparable to wider Australia (medium age 38).

== Community ==
=== Places of worship ===
Phap Hoa Temple is located on Butler Avenue, next to Pennington Primary School.

The Catholic Church in the suburb is dedicated to Our Lady of Mount Carmel.

=== Schools ===
The suburb includes Pennington Primary School and the R-2 campus of Pennington Junior Primary School. Mount Carmel Primary School is also in Pennington.

== Attractions ==
There are shops and medical practices on Addison Road.

=== Parks ===
The largest park in Pennington lies between Butler Court, Booker Court and Windsor Avenue.

The Pennington Oval on Butler Avenue provides a venue for regular local sporting fixtures.

== Transport ==
=== Roads ===
The suburb is served by the following main roads:

- Grand Junction Road, running east–west from Vista to Queenstown
- Addison Road, running through the middle of Pennington.
- Torrens Road, running northwest from North Adelaide, terminates in Pennington.

=== Public transport ===
Pennington is served by public transport run by Adelaide Metro.

==== Trains ====
There is no train stop in Pennington itself; the closest station is St Clair.

Timetable
Route map

==== Buses ====
Grand Junction Road is served by the 230, 232, 254 and the 254X express bus services. Torrens Road is served by the 230 and 232 services. Park Avenue and Northgate Streets are served by the 252 service.

== See also ==
- List of Adelaide suburbs
