= Ferryden Park Primary School =

Location
- Oban Street; Ferryden Park, South Australia, 5010; Australia; 34.8664°S 138.5635°E

Information
- Type: State primary day school
- Religious affiliation: Non-denominational
- Established: 1953
- Closed: 2010
- Authority: Department for Education (South Australia)
- Principal: Lee Sansom
- Year levels: CPC – Year 7
- Gender: Coeducational
- Enrolment: 159 (17 in CPC) (August 2005)
- Area: 3.63 hectares (0.036 km^{2})
- Colours: Navy blue; Gold
- Slogan: Honesty, Respect, Responsibility, Excellence
- Website: ferrydenps.sa.edu.au (Archived)

Ferryden Park Primary School was a primary school in Ferryden Park (South Australia, Australia) that was closed in 2010. The school was encompassed by the Parks Ward of the City of Port Adelaide Enfield council area.

== Nomenclature ==
The school derived its name from the suburb in which it is located, and in turn the suburb's name (founded in 1924) is derived from the seaport of Ferryden in Forfarshire (Scotland) where the Ferryden Park suburb's founder, William Duthie dairyman of Tam O'Shanter Belt, emigrated from in 1850.

== Opening ==
The school was built and opened in 1953.

== Administration ==
Lee Sansom became the school's last principal (2006–2011), upon the departure of Janet Shilling in 2005. Prior principals have included Graeme Hambley.

== Students ==
The school's student enrolment peaked in 1959, with an enrolment of 639 students, due in part to the post-war boom of the 1950s. In February 2006, four years before its closure, the school had an enrolment of 153, with 34 in CPC, and were predicted to have a total of 180 (1–7) and 40 in CPC. The trend in student enrolments (August figures) before the school's closure was:

Trend in enrolment figures
Year	Years (CPC – 7)									Ref
Year	CPC	1	2	3	4	5	6	7	Total	Ref
2002	20	24	24	21	17	20	14	22	162	
2003	19	25	19	18	20	15	21	18	155	
2004	21	21	22	20	25	19	16	25	150	
2005	17	27	21	18	16	23	20	17	159	
2006	40 ^{†}	-	-	-	-	-	-	-	180 ^{†}	

† The actual enrolment figures for February 2006 were a total of 153 (years 1–7) and 34 in CPC. The 2006 figures quoted in this table, a list of the final figures for each year, were only predicted figures for the end of 2006.

In 2006, the enrolments demonstrated the impact of the proposed Westwood redevelopment program, with 8 students leaving for interstate/overseas, 4 transferring to non-Government schools, 42 transferring to South Australia Government Schools and 4 leaving for other reasons, making a total of 58 leavers (31%).

In 1997, the "Materials and Service Charge", a charge is payable in each year in respect of a student enrolled at a school for materials and services was $115.

== Closure ==
Ferryden Park Primary School closed at the end of 2010. The school was merged with four other similar schools in the area, i.e. Ridley Grove Primary School, Mansfield Park Primary School, Woodville Gardens Preschool, and Parks Children's Centre, to form the new Woodville Gardens School, built on the old Ridley Grove Primary School site. The merger occurred as part of the Education Works New Schools Project of the Department of Education and Children's Services. The purpose of the school's closure was to make way for new "super schools", Woodville Gardens School and Blair Athol North School.

The vacated school site was earmarked for residential development. In 2015, the former Ferryden Park Primary School suffered a fire which damaged three of the school's sheds. Despite advocacy for the site to be dedicated to community use as a park, the school's land was cleared and rezoned for residential development and developed into a residential subdivision called "Westwood", with numerous lots and new housing constructed on the land.

== See also ==
- Education in South Australia
- List of schools in South Australia
- Lists of schools in Australia
