= Ferryden =

Village in Angus, Scotland

Coordinates: 56.69°N 2.47°W

- Location within Angus
- Area: 0.26 km^{2} (0.10 sq mi)
- Population: 1,220 (2020)
  - Density: 4,692/km^{2} (12,150/sq mi)
- Demonym: Ferrydenner
- OS grid reference: NO7156
- Council area: Angus
- Lieutenancy area: Angus
- Country: Scotland
- Sovereign state: United Kingdom
- Post town: Montrose
- Postcode district: DD10
- Police: Scotland
- Fire: Scottish
- Ambulance: Scottish
- UK Parliament: Angus
- Scottish Parliament: Angus North and Mearns

Ferryden is a village in Angus, Scotland in the community council area of Ferryden & Craig. It lies southerly adjacent to the town of Montrose on the south bank of the South Esk and is considered a fringe locality of Montrose, being connected to the latter by the former Rossie Island, now home to shipping facilities and Montrose Port Authority.

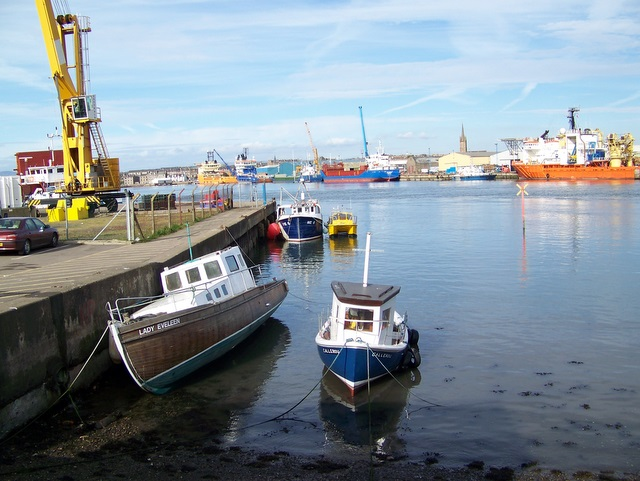
Pier at Ferryden

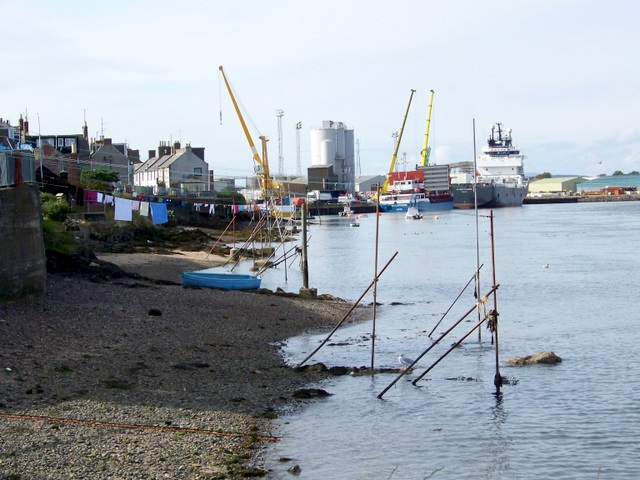
South bank of the South Esk at Ferryden

== History ==
Ferryden owes its name to the ferry crossing that crossed the South Esk river to and from Montrose, with the earliest record of a ferry crossing being recorded in 1178 when King William the Lion granted the ferryboat of Montrose and its lands to Arbroath Abbey. The village itself began to grow in the 1700s when fishermen from the North East were encouraged to settle by Patrick Scott of Rossie.

== Geography ==
Ferryden was joined to Rossie Island, a former island at the mouth of the South Esk in the late 20th century by infilling. The 1911 Encyclopædia Britannica lists the population of the island (160) as separate from the village of Ferryden (1330):

In the mouth of the channel of the South Esk lies the island of Rossie, or Inchbrayock (pop. 160), which in 1829 was connected with the burgh by means of a suspension bridge 432 ft. long and by a drawbridge with the south bank near the fishing village of Ferryden (pop. 1330). The harbour lies between the suspension bridge and the sea, and is provided with a wet dock.

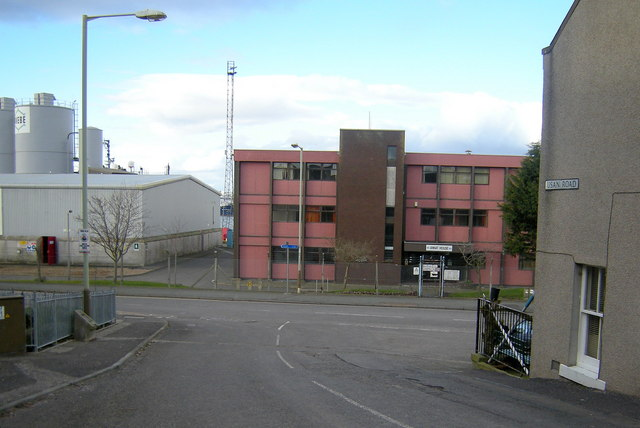
Usan Road junction, Ferryden

== Facilities ==
There is one school in the village, namely Ferryden Primary School on Craig Crescent.
