= Regency Park, South Australia =

Coordinates: 34°51′36″S 138°34′12″E

Regency Park
- Suburb
- Country: Australia
- State: South Australia
- City: Adelaide
- Location: 6 km (3.7 mi) from Adelaide GPO

Government
  - State electorate: Croydon
  - Federal division: Adelaide

Population
  - Total: 60 (SAL 2021)
- Postcode: 5010
Suburbs around Regency Park
Wingfield	Wingfield	Cavan
Angle Park, Ferryden Park	Regency Park	Kilburn
Croydon Park	Croydon Park, Dudley Park	Prospect

Regency Park is an inner-northern suburb of Adelaide, 6 km from the City Centre, in the state of South Australia, Australia. It is located in the City of Port Adelaide Enfield, and is adjacent to Wingfield, Angle Park, Ferryden Park, Kilburn, Prospect, Dudley Park and Croydon Park. It is bounded to the north by Grand Junction Road, east by the Gawler railway line, south by Regency Road and to the west by Days and South Roads. The postcode for Regency Park is 5010.

Regency Park is essentially an industrial suburb, consisting of factories, but primarily industrial warehouses. Its streets are dominated by semitrailers.

== History ==
The approximate area of Regency Park was originally called Tam O'Shanter Belt after the ship Tam O'Shanter which was grounded for several days near North Arm in December 1836. The ship passengers walked to North Adelaide and saw the ship behind them over a distinct belt of trees. The southern half of today's suburb of Regency Park was acquired in October 1838 by John Wright, a wealthy English banker, and was subsequently sold to the Tam O'Shanter Land Company. The village of Tam O'Shanter was created and occupied the present area of Regency Park.

Between 1850 and 1860, a school, and The Freshwater Springs hotel was constructed. It was a semi-rural area, producing mainly vegetables and dairy products. In 1879 land that is now Regency Park was acquired by the City of Adelaide for the purpose of constructing the Islington Sewage Farm which operated from 1881 until 1966. From that time the land fell into disuse until the creation of the new industrial suburb of Regency Park, named in honour of Queen Elizabeth II (the regent) on her visit to Adelaide in 1970.

Regency Park was subdivided by the Government for light industry in four phrases between 1975 and 1981. In 1981 Sunnybrae Farm, 1.8 hectares (4.4 acres) of land remaining from the subdivisions, was transferred to the City of Enfield and declared a Historic Conservation and Recreation Centre. The Enfield & Districts Historical Society was incorporated in 1982 and the old farm buildings at Sunnybrae were restored by the society in partnership with the council. The site now houses a function centre and includes a museum originally created by the historical society.

== Commercial, educational and administrative facilities ==
The largest family owned Australian brewery, Coopers Brewery relocated from Leabrook to the corner of South Road and Regency Road in Regency Park in 2001.

The Regency Campus of TAFE SA (formerly the Regency Institute of TAFE, and earlier title, Regency Park Community College) is located in Regency Park along with a special school for children with a mental disability.

Due to the heavy presence of commercial shipping in Regency Park, there is a Transport SA office in the suburb catering largely for the semi trailers associated with the local industry.

== Tourism, sport and recreation facilities ==
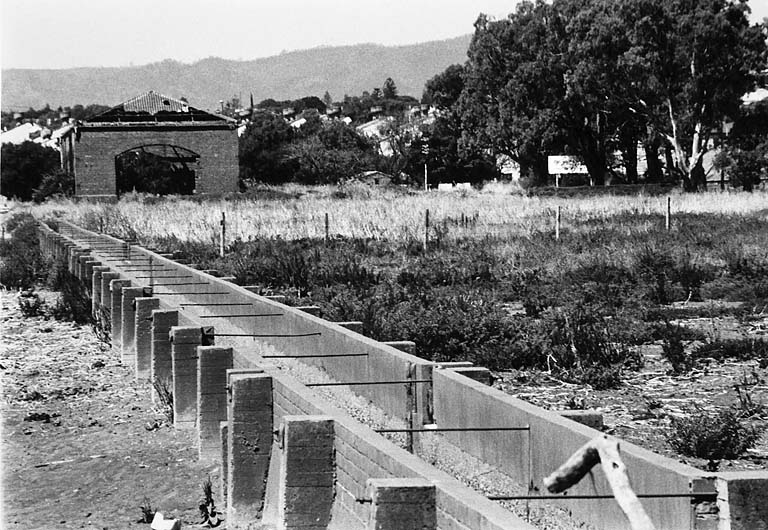
Islington Sewage Farm Straining Shed, facing east in the late 19th century

The historic Islington Sewage Farm Straining Shed in Pedder Crescent and Sunnybrae Farm Complex on Naweena Road and are both listed on the South Australian Heritage Register. From 1995 until 2012 the Enfield & District Historical Society operated a history museum at the Sunnybrae complex after which time the property passed into private hands.

A large part of Regency Park west of South Road is occupied by the Regency Park Golf Course and adjoining recreation park facilities.

== Industry ==
In October 1979 the State Transport Authority opened a bus and tram workshop on the corner of South and Regency roads replacing a facility in Hackney. In 2012 the site was taken over by Coopers Brewery.

== Transport ==
The 361 bus serves Grand Junction Road. The 300 bus serves Regency Road its entire length. The 230 and 232 buses only serve Regency Road as far as Days Road. The 239 bus serves Days Road and Grand Junction Road. The suburb is also served by Islington railway station on the Gawler railway line. The North-South Motorway runs through Regency Park. It was recently extended; during this extension, the Regency Road intersection was removed.

== Sources ==
Lewis, H.J, Enfield and the northern villages, Corporation of the City of Enfield, 1985
