= Caulonia =

Caulonia Castelvetere Kavlonía
- Comune
- Comune di Caulonia
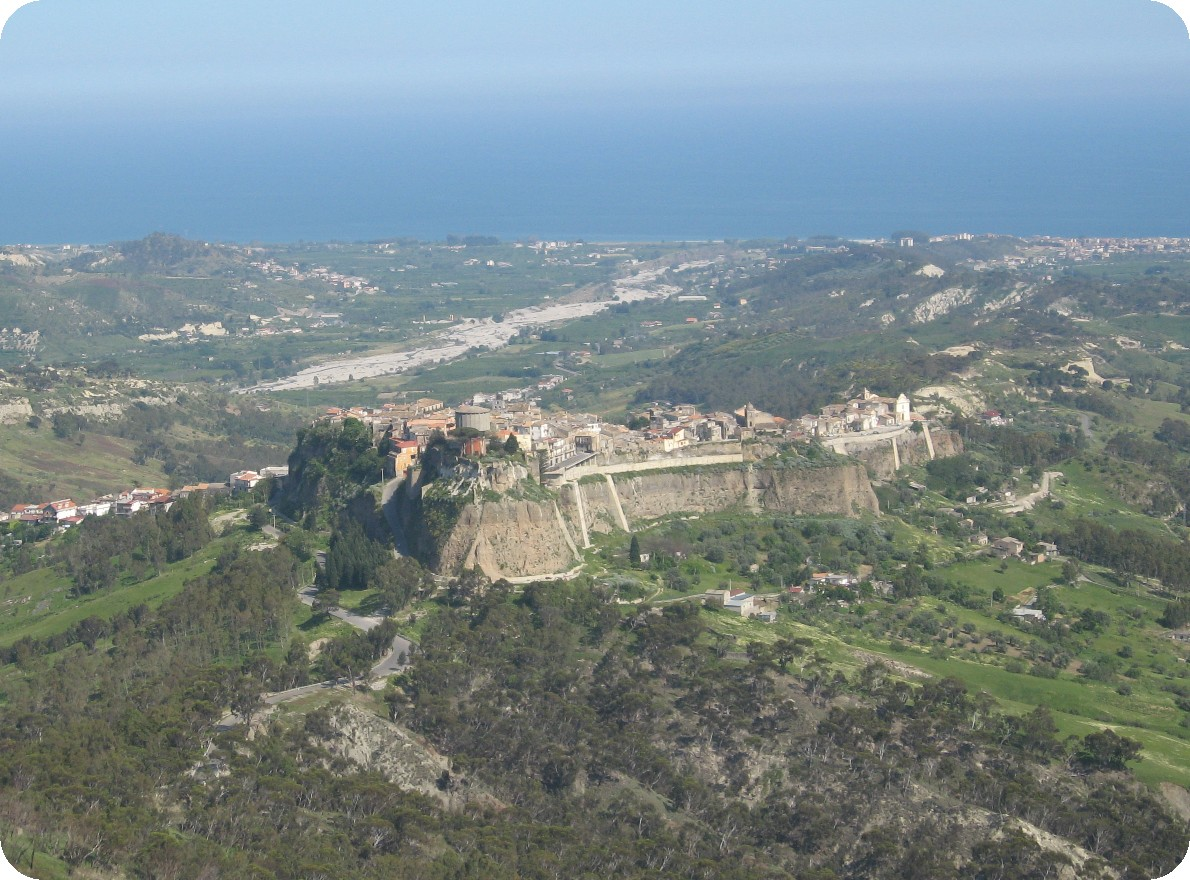
- Caulonia Superiore is built on a steep hill further inland while Caulonia Marina lies on the coast.

- Coat of arms

- Location within Italy Location within Calabria
- Coordinates: 38°23′N 16°25′E
- Country: Italy
- Region: Calabria
- Metropolitan city: Reggio Calabria (RC)
- Frazioni: Agromastelli, Campoli, Crochi, Cufò, Focà, San Nicola, Ursini, Ziia

Government
  - Mayor: Ninni Riccio

Area
  - Total: 100.7 km^{2} (38.9 sq mi)

Population (December 2007)
  - Total: 7,411
  - Density: 73.59/km^{2} (190.6/sq mi)
- Demonym: Cauloniesi
- Time zone: UTC+1 (CET)
  - Summer (DST): UTC+2 (CEST)
- Postal code: 89041
- Dialing code: 0964

Caulonia is a comune (municipality) in the Province of Reggio Calabria in the Italian region Calabria, located about 60 kilometres (37 mi) southwest of Catanzaro and about 120 kilometres (75 mi) northeast of Reggio Calabria in the Stilaro Valley. Originally it was known as Castelvetere, but in 1862 the citizens decided to change the name of the town to that of the ancient city Caulonia. They believed that this city had been located on their territory, but it was eventually proved that ancient Caulonia was to be found near modern Monasterace, 16 kilometres (10 mi) to the northeast.

== History ==
=== Late Antiquity and Middle Ages ===
The origin of the town probably lies in Late Antiquity, when the settlement was known as Castrum Vetus.

In 1594 Castelvetere opposed a strong resistance to a brutal siege carried out by the massive Turkish army led by Sinan Cicala. Around 8000 armed forces besieged the fortified Castelvetere, administered by Marquis Fabrizio Carafa, as well as Prince of Terra della Roccella. The defense device, put in place by the Marquis, used the help under the command of Giovanni Marullo, Francesco Plutino and brothers Francesco and Carlo Siscara, noble citizens, displaced to preside the four urban gates. After a brutal battle, which lasted many hours, the siege is broken and the massive Turkish army, which had lost its commander-in-chief on the battlefield, is put on the run, chased by Castelveterin knights.

The town was ruled by various lords during the Middle Ages. The Carafa family, from the Neapolitan nobility, was granted the town by King Ferdinand II of Aragon at the end of the fifteenth century. Fra' Gregorio Carafa was born here in 1615 and was the 62nd Prince and Grand Master of the Order of Malta from 1680 to 1690.

=== Modern period ===
Caulonia was known as Castelvetere until 1862, when the town changed its name to Caulonia, following Calabria's integration with Italy during the Italian unification. The citizens did so to honor the ancient Greek city, which they thought was located in Castelvetere's territory. This belief proved to be mistaken, because almost three decades later the archaeologist Paolo Orsi proved conclusively that the ancient city was located at Punta Stilo, near Monasterace.

During the early 20th century, thousands of Cauloniesi migrated abroad. The first waves of migrants went to the United States. Changes in U.S. immigration law in the 1920s, in part to reduce the number of southern European immigrants, caused Cauloniesi migration to shift to other venues, especially Australia, Canada, and Argentina, in the latter waves of twentieth century migration.

For five days in March 1945, with the fascist regime of Benito Mussolini overthrown, "Red Republic of Caulonia" led by an elementary school teacher named Pasquale Cavallaro, was proclaimed in Caulonia. A communist, Cavallaro had been elected mayor of Caulonia in 1944. The short-lived republic was the product of a peasants' revolt against abusive landowners. Cavallaro resigned his mayorship to lead the revolt. When the uprising was ultimately crushed, which required a military operation involving both Allied and carabinieri units, 350 Red Cauloniesi were put on trial in nearby Locri for sedition. Most were ultimately pardoned, but Cavallaro himself served eight years in prison.

Via Vincenzo Niutta in Caulonia Superiore today

Major floods hit Caulonia and its surrounding hamlets in 1951 and 1953. These floods, combined with ongoing emigration, caused significant declines in Caulonia's population, with the comune's center of economic activity now on the coast at the frazione of Marina di Caulonia. Many of the homes in Caulonia Superiore are vacant, though some of these abandoned buildings are occupied by squatting artists.

== Festivals ==
Festivals in Caulonia Superiore attract thousands, especially the annual "Kaulonia Tarantella Festival" or KTF in late August, which features live tarantella music and tarantella dancing workshops.

== Immigration, the Feast of Saint Hilarion & Aged Care for Immigrants ==
Cauloniese people (those from Caulonia) are part of the Italian Diaspora, particularly in Adelaide, South Australia, where they comprise the largest group of Italian immigrants from a single village. Almost all of that immigration happened in the post war years between the 1950s-1960s and into the 1970s. Many of those immigrants moved to the western suburbs of Adelaide, particularly in suburbs such as Kidman Park, Findon, Fulham Gardens, Lockleys, Flinders Park and Seaton. To this day, the surviving original immigrants and their descendants, many of whom married within the Italian community, still live in the western suburbs of Adelaide in a triangular geographic area between the Adelaide CBD, West Beach to the South, and West Lakes to the North, with Torrens Road and West Lakes Boulevard acting as one important traffic route heading South-West; and Sir Donald Bradman Drive as a northern traffic route. Grange Road, which runs between these two routes remains today, perhaps the most important arterial road servicing the suburbs in which most people of Cauloniese descent (and the wider Italian community) travel upon on a daily basis.

People of Cauloniese descent in Adelaide still celebrate many of the great traditions brought to Adelaide by the original immigrants. The most notable being the Festa di S. Ilarione (Feast of Saint Hilarion) which to this day, is the largest religious Italian festival held in South Australia. It honours the Sant'Ilario (Saint Hilarion), the patron saint of Caulonia, held on the third Sunday of October every year, during the Australian Spring. It has been held continuously for nearly seventy years, since the formation of the Society of Saint Hilario (Società di Sant'Ilario). The Feast was first held for a short time in the North-Eastern suburb of Newton, only to move to its more 'spiritual home' of western Adelaide thanks to President Nick Fazzalari, where it was held for many years at Saint Michael's College at Henley Beach, before moving again to the Mater Christi Church grounds, and in 2022, the President of the Society, Mr Vince Greco moved the Feast to the expansive grounds of Gleneagles Reserve at Seaton where the larger area and easier parking better accommodates the growing crowds of people attending the event. The Feast is well attended by people visiting from all parts of Adelaide and from organised tour buses of tourists visiting from regional areas of South Australia and interstate Australia. Frequently, people attend the Feast from Caulonia itself, impressed by the size and scope of the event, the level of organisation put into staging it, and that Cauloiniese culture is still thriving after so many decades after the original immigration. Major acts are brought into Adelaide from abroad as major attractions to the Feast, as well as the reputation the Feast has for cooking and selling the best zeppole in Adelaide. At the 2024 Feast, the headline act was none other than Mimmo Cavallaro and his band, who were brought to Australia by Nick Fazzalari (Past President of Saint Hilarion). Mimmo Cavallaro is the most famous and celebrated proponents in the world of Calabrian music. He is a native of Caulonia and has become a global musical success, and easily the most recognised celebrity in Caulonia.

The Cauloniese community today in Adelaide has grown very large, now into the third generation of Australian-born children. The culture, religion, tradition and foods are handed down to each generation through family get-togethers, important milestones such as Christmas and Easter, events such as the Feast of Saint Hilarion, the Catholic Church (particularly weekly Mass at Mater Christi at Seaton) and a concerted effort by leaders in the Cauloniese community such as Vince Greco and the committee of the Society of Saint Hilarion to bring young people together to teach them about their heritage. Efforts include regular lunches organised by Roy Fazzallari celebrating Calabrese (Calabrian) food. These are called the Pranzo Dell'Amicizia and are held twice a year to foster Italian culture and friendship in South Australia.

One of the most important achievements of the Cauloniese community was to establish the House of Saint Hilarion at Seaton, a large nursing home facility providing aged care for old people. It operates across two sites in western Adelaide that offers aged care catered toward the cultural, food, religious and medical needs of elderly Cauloniese and the wider Italian community. It was created in the 1980s by the President Nick Fazzalari, originally at the Lockleys site that has since been replaced by the newer, larger Seaton facility; as well as a Findon site (also replaced by Seaton); and a Fulham facility called the Villa Saint Hilarion that still operates. The establishment of aged care facilities in the 1980s represented forward thinking by the Cauloniese community leaders such as Nick Fazzalari and the committee at the time because they foresaw the need to create a place to eventually put their parents (the original immigrants from Caulonia) at some point in the future when they would need nursing home care - and they wanted to make sure that they would be comfortable, looked after and have their Italian identity and needs respected.

An international documentary on Italian migration and tourism in South Australia is being filmed and produced in 2025 by Steven, a member of the Cauloniese community in Adelaide. It will showcase the Cauloniese community in Adelaide as well as other Italian communities in Melbourne and Sydney. It is due for release late 2025.

== See also ==
- Vallata dello Stilaro Allaro
- Ecomuseo delle ferriere e fonderie di Calabria
- The town is featured in two of Michelangelo Frammartino's films: Il dono (2003) and Le quattro volte (2010).
