= Tapleys Hill Road =

Road in Adelaide, Australia

Tapleys Hill Road Brighton Road, Ocean Boulevard, Lonsdale Road, Dyson Road; Murray Road, Gawler Street South Australia
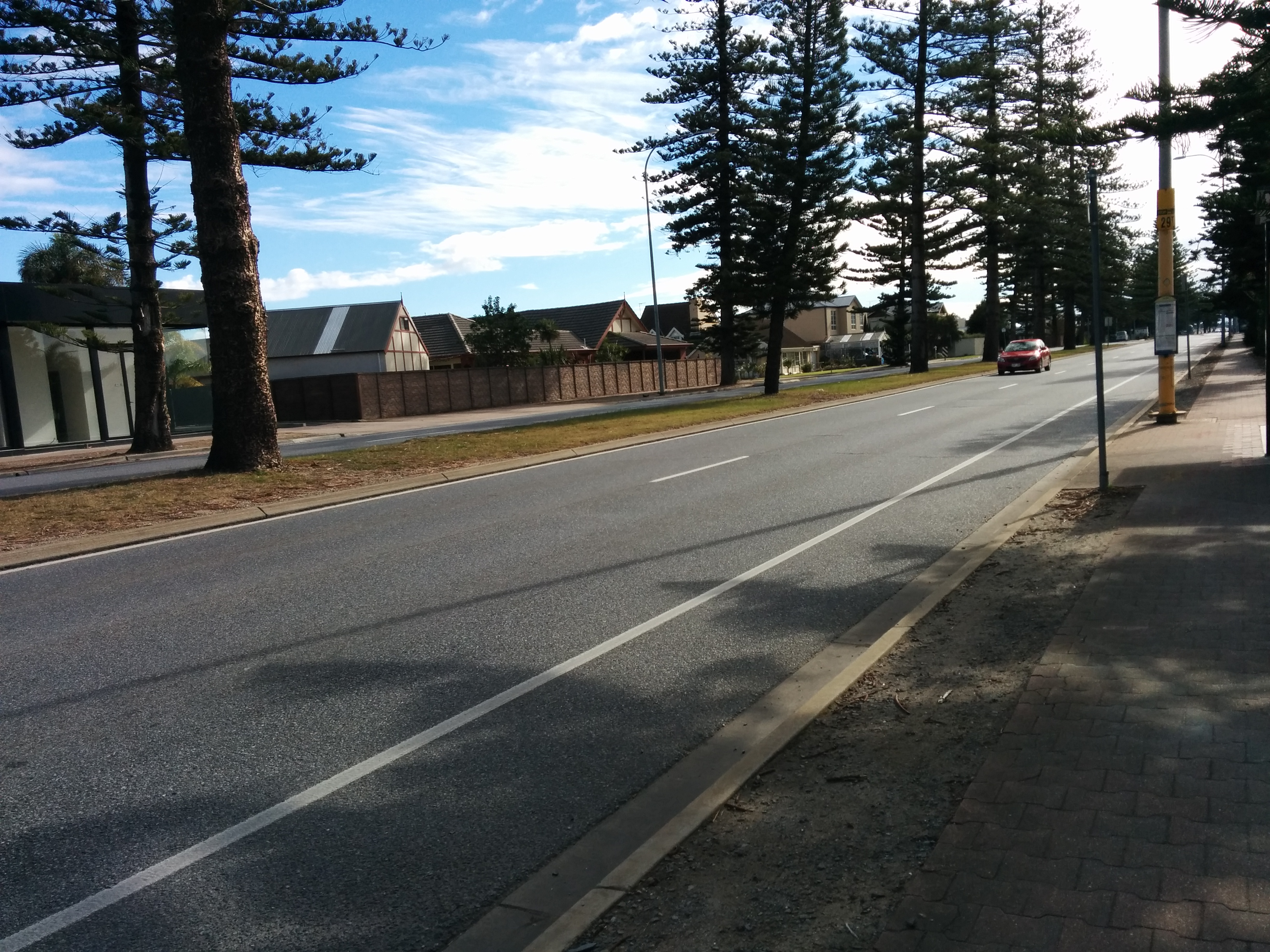
- Tapleys Hill Road at Glenelg North, facing north
- Coordinates: 34.863383°S 138.514726°E (North end); 35.149060°S 138.473104°E (South end)

General information
- Type: Road
- Location: Adelaide
- Length: 35.9 km (22 mi)
- Route number(s): A15 (1998–present)

Major junctions
- North end: Port Road; Queenstown, Adelaide
- Sir Donald Bradman Drive; Anzac Highway
- South end: Grey Street; Port Noarlunga, Adelaide

Location(s)
- Region: Western Adelaide, Southern Adelaide
- Major suburbs: Seaton, Fulham, Glenelg, Hove, Brighton, Seacliff Park, Hallett Cove, Christies Beach

Tapleys Hill Road is a section of the north–south arterial road which runs parallel to the coast through western Adelaide, Australia. This entire allocation is best known as by the names of its constituent parts: Tapleys Hill Road proper, Brighton Road, Ocean Boulevard, Lonsdale Road, Dyson Road, Murray Road, and Gawler Street. This article deals with the entire length of the corridor for sake of completion, as well to avoid confusion between declarations. The section Tapleys Hill Road is a remnant of an historic road, and no longer runs to the geographic feature Tapleys Hill.

== Route ==
The Tapleys Hill Road corridor runs north–south through Adelaide's western and south-western suburbs, to the mouth of the Onkaparinga River at its southern end. From its intersection with Port Road in Queenstown, it runs south as Tapleys Hill Road through Seaton and Fulham, passing along Adelaide Airport's western boundary, until it reaches Anzac Highway in Glenelg. It changes name to Brighton Road and continues south through Hove and Brighton.

At Seacliff Park, it changes its name to Ocean Boulevard. At Majors Road in Trott Park, it changes name to Lonsdale Road. It continues in a south-westerly direction through Hallett Cove to meet Sherriffs Road in Lonsdale. It changes name to Dyson Road and continues in a south-westerly direction to Christies Beach. It turns west into Murray Road and turns southwest into Gawler Street to terminate in Port Noarlunga.

Places of interest located on Tapleys Hill Road include the Royal Adelaide Golf Course, Harbour Town and a viewing area at the western end of Adelaide Airport.

Tapleys Hill Road, including all its constituent roads, was designated part of route A15 in 1998. In 2021, this was extended south of the Onkaparinga River, along Saltfleet Street, Commercial Road and Maslin Beach Road to Tatachilla.

== History ==
Prior to an upgrade in the 1990s, Tapleys Hill Road's southern end was joined to Anzac Highway, about 100 metres to the west of where it currently lays. The upgrade involved re-aligning the roadway, and taking Tapleys Hill Road to Brighton Road's northern end, removing congestion in a busy area. The old roadway still exists, now named Old Tapleys Hill Road, and is rarely used as a through route, servicing mainly residents of the area.

Tapleys Hill (35°03′S 138°34′E) is located west of Flagstaff Road and east of Main South Road on the boundary of the suburbs of O'Halloran Hill and Flagstaff Hill, near the Victoria Hotel (colloquially "Top of Taps Hotel"). The hill was named for Thomas Tapley (1789–1856). (Note: Thomas Tapley (1789 – 14 June 1856) and his wife Mary Tapley, née Morford (1791 – c. 20 January 1867), and nine children arrived South Australia aboard Rajasthan, Captain Ritchie, in November 1838. they farmed in the area and established the Victoria Hotel, first licensed March 1844. His granddaughter Edith Tapley (1869–1971) married J. D. Somerville. Around January 1855 Tapley, his wife and youngest daughter, moved to South Terrace, Adelaide, where he died the following year.)

The hill is the source of the name for Tapleys Hill Road. The road forms the initial half of the traditional route from Port Adelaide to Tapley's Hill. The remainder of the traditional route, from Glenelg onwards, being via Diagonal Road and since-altered local roads up the hill from Darlington.

== Major intersections ==
LGA	Location	km	mi	Destinations	Notes
Port Adelaide Enfield	Alberton–Queenstown boundary	0.0	0.0	Port Road (A7) – Port Adelaide, Woodville, Hindmarsh	Northern terminus of Tapleys Hill Road and route A15
Port Adelaide Enfield–Charles Sturt boundary	Queenstown–Royal Park–Hendon tripoint	0.4	0.25	Old Port Road – Port Adelaide, Cheltenham	
Charles Sturt	Royal Park–Seaton boundary	2.0	1.2	West Lakes Boulevard – West Lakes, Albert Park	
Charles Sturt	Seaton–Fulham Gardens boundary	5.0	3.1	Grange Road – Grange, Findon, Hindmarsh	
West Torrens	Fulham	7.3	4.5	Henley Beach Road – Henley Beach, Lockleys, Mile End	
River Torrens		7.8	4.8	Bridge over the river	
West Torrens	West Beach–Adelaide Airport boundary	8.1	5.0	Burbridge Road (A6 west) – West Beach; Sir Donald Bradman Drive (A6 east) – Hilton, Adelaide CBD, Adelaide Airport	
Holdfast Bay	Glenelg North–Glenelg–Glenelg East tripoint	13.1	8.1	Anzac Highway (A5 east, unallocated west) – Glenelg, Plympton, Wayville	Name change: Tapleys Hill Road (north), Brighton Road (south)
Holdfast Bay	Glenelg–Glenelg East boundary	13.5	8.4	Jetty Road – Glenelg	Glenelg tram line runs through intersection along Jetty Road
Holdfast Bay	Glenelg–Glenelg East–Glenelg South tripoint	14.1	8.8	Diagonal Road – Oaklands Park, Darlington	
Holdfast Bay	Hove–Brighton boundary	17.2	10.7	Seaford railway line	
Holdfast Bay	Brighton	17.9	11.1	Sturt Road – Oaklands Park, Tonsley	
Holdfast Bay–Marion boundary	Seacliff–Seacliff Park boundary	20.1	12.5	Scholefield Road – Marino	Name change: Brighton Road (north), Ocean Boulevard (south)
Marion	Seacliff Park–Hallett Cove–Trott Park boundary	22.3	13.9	Majors Road – O'Halloran Hill	Name change: Ocean Boulevard (north), Lonsdale Road (south)
Onkaparinga	Lonsdale	29.7	18.5	Sherriffs Road – Reynella	Name change: Lonsdale Road (north), Dyson Road (south)
Onkaparinga	Lonsdale	30.6	19.0	Seaford railway line	
Onkaparinga	Port Noarlunga	34.5	21.4	Dyson Road (south) – Port Noarlunga	Name change: Dyson Road (north), Murray Road (west)
Onkaparinga	Port Noarlunga	35.5	22.1	Murray Road (west) – Port Noarlunga	Name change: Murray Road (east), Gawler Street (southwest)
Onkaparinga	Port Noarlunga	35.9	22.3	Gawler Street (west) – Port Noarlunga	
Onkaparinga	Port Noarlunga	35.9	22.3	Grey Street (A15 south) – Seaford, Aldinga	Route A15 continues south along Grey Street
Route transition
