= Fulham, South Australia =

Fulham
- Suburb
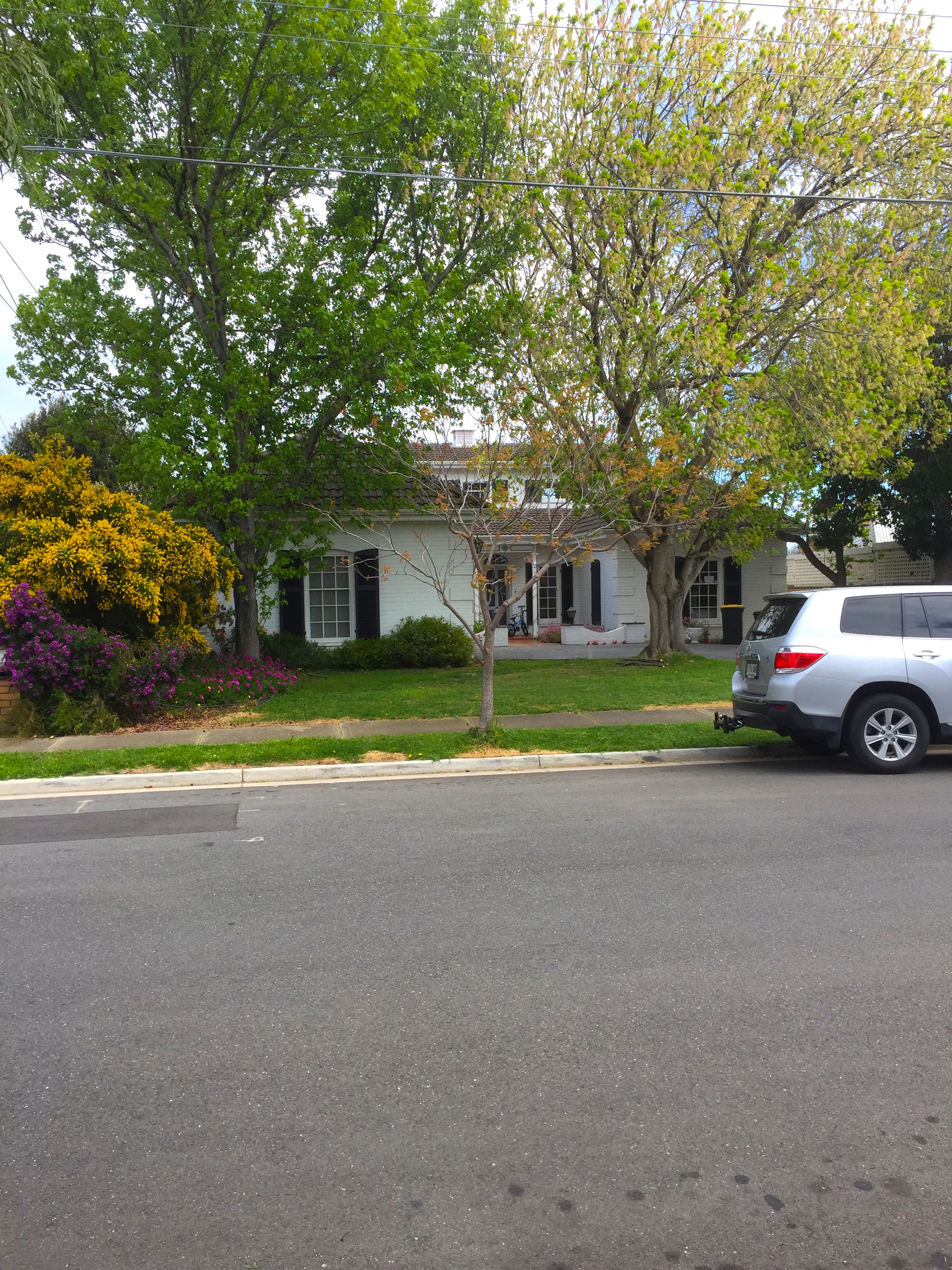
- A post-war residential house in Fulham

- Country: Australia
- State: South Australia
- City: Adelaide
- LGA: City of West Torrens
- Location: 8 km (5.0 mi) west of Adelaide city centre

Government
  - State electorate: Colton (2011)
  - Federal division: Hindmarsh (2011)

Population
  - Total: 2,920 (SAL 2021)
- Postcode: 5024
Suburbs around Fulham
Henley Beach	Fulham Gardens	Lockleys
Henley Beach South	Fulham	Lockleys
West Beach	West Beach	Lockleys

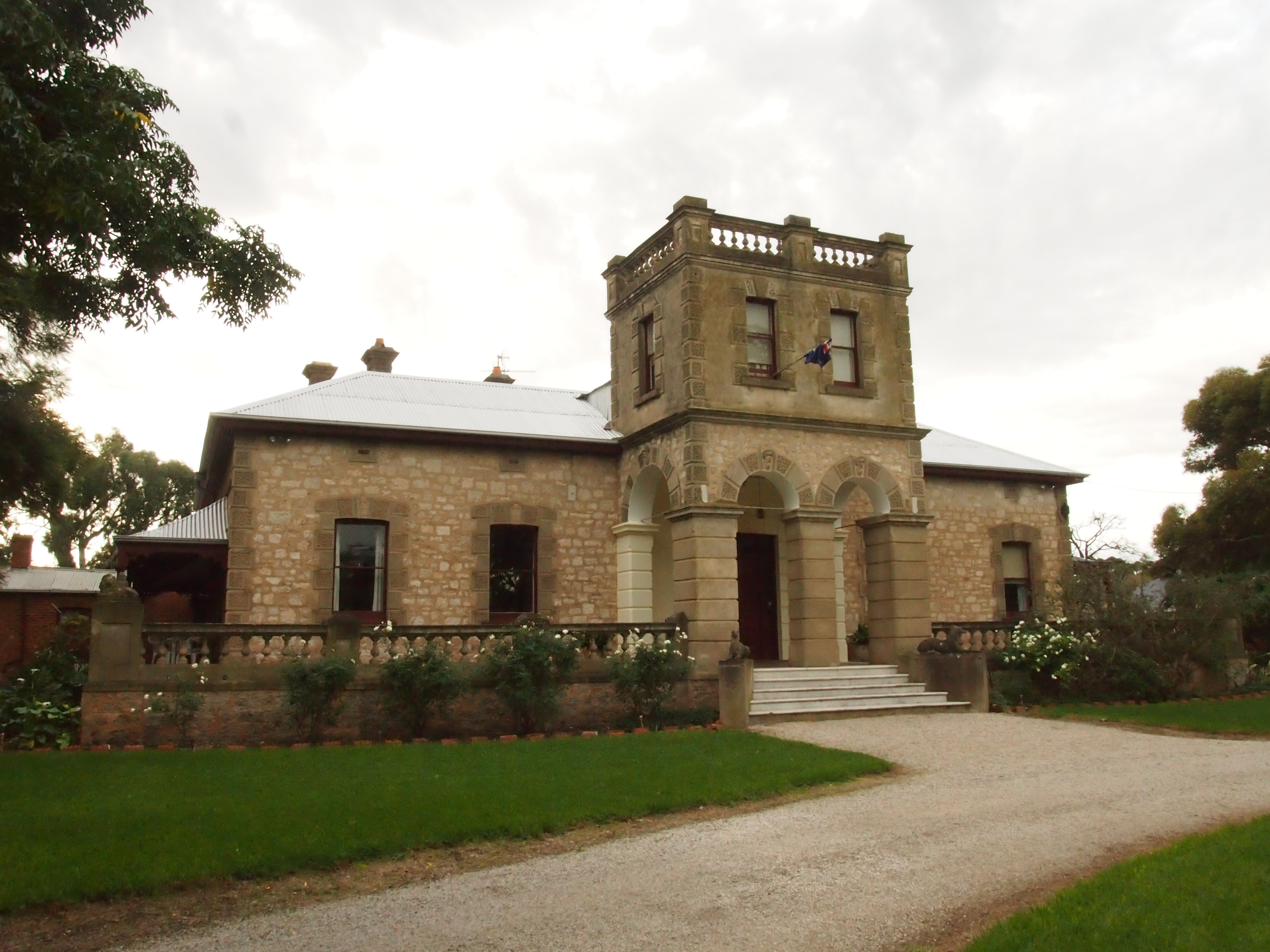
Weetunga, built in 1878 by Samuel White

Fulham is a western suburb of Adelaide, South Australia. It is located in the City of West Torrens.

== History ==
The area incorporating the current suburb of Fulham was purchased c. 1836 by John White (? –30 December 1860), who named it Fulham Farm after the suburb of Fulham in his native London. The White family home, Weetunga, was built by his son, Samuel White (1835?–16 November 1880), father of Samuel Albert White (1870–1954). It took three years to build, and remained with the family until placed on the market in 2014. The house was damaged by an alleged arson attack in May 2026.

Both Weetunga and The Oaks in Henley Beach Road are listed on the South Australian Heritage Register.

== Geography ==
Fulham sits on a bend in the River Torrens. The suburb also sits astride the intersection of Tapleys Hill Road and Henley Beach Road.

== Demographics ==
The 2006 census by the Australian Bureau of Statistics counted 2,611 persons in Fulham on census night. Of these, 49.8% were male and 50.2% were female.

The majority of residents (73.5%) are of Australian birth, with other common census responses being Italy (5.4%) and England (5.1%).

The age distribution of Fulham residents is skewed towards an older population than the greater Australian population. 74.1% of residents were over 25 years in 2006, compared to the Australian average of 66.5%; and 25.9% were younger than 25 years, compared to the Australian average of 33.5%.

== Community ==
Fulham is represented by the Fulham Cricket Club, which was established in 1905, however now plays home matches on Collins Reserve in neighbouring Kidman Park.

== Facilities and attractions ==
=== Parks ===
The largest greenspace in Fulham is Linear Park, lying along the River Torrens on the suburb's southern boundary.

== Transportation ==
=== Roads ===
Fulham is serviced by Henley Beach Road, connecting the suburb to Adelaide city centre, and Tapleys Hill Road, one of the major arterial roads in the western suburbs of Adelaide.

=== Public transport ===
Fulham is serviced by public transport run by the Adelaide Metro, including:

- H32 bus to Henley Beach South
- H30 bus to West Lakes
- H22 bus to Henley Beach South

=== Bicycle routes ===
A bicycle path extends along Linear Park.

== See also ==
- List of Adelaide suburbs
