= Red Republic of Caulonia =

Short-lived communist state in Italy

Red Republic of Caulonia Repubblica Rossa di Caulonia
- Anthem: Bandiera Rossa
- Map of comune of Caulonia
- Capital: Caulonia
- Official languages: Italian
- Common languages: Calabrese dialect
- Demonym: Caulonists
- Government: Socialist republic
  - President: Pasquale Cavallaro
- History
  - Established: 6 March 1945
  - Disestablished: 9 March 1945

Area
  - Total: 101.76 km^{2} (39.29 sq mi)

Population
  - Estimate: 12,500
  - Census: 1945
- Today part of: Italy

The Red Republic of Caulonia (Italian: Repubblica Rossa di Caulonia) was a short lived revolutionary communist Italian state formed on 6 March 1945 by the mayor of Caulonia Pasquale Cavallaro, an elementary teacher and former seminarian who joined the Italian Communist Party in 1943.

The revolt which had led to the proclamation of the republic was provoked by protests and turmoil of peasants, still under the control of powerful landowners who wanted to preserve their privileges obtained during fascism and after the Italian unification.

== History ==
In October 1943, sections of the Italian Socialist Party, Communist Party and Chamber of Workers reopened in the freed Calabria. Caulonia is a little a town in Reggio Calabria comune where the clash between peasants and landowners was becoming more harsh due to the poor economic conditions of peasants.

At the time, Pasquale Cavallaro was a 31-year-old elementary school teacher from a rural family who had been an antifascist since the march on Rome in 1922. During the fascist regime, Cavallaro had been arrested several times and sentenced to confinement from 1933 to 1937. In 1942, he continued his recruitment activities in the clandestine Communist Party which he joined in 1943.

In January 1944, the Reggio Calabria prefetto Antonio Priolo appointed Pasquale Cavallaro as mayor of Caulonia, with the support of the Communist Party. He had applied new reforms which led to the seizure of weapons and grain stockpiled by landowners. Moreover, he had requested research be done on the usurpations of state lands. The report revealed that 75% of state lands were illegally owned by some local rich families. Meanwhile, former fascists continued to provoke tensions among civilians.

Among the town streets, some southern partisan groups led by the son of the mayor, Ercole Cavallaro, had begun to commit acts of violence: the farmhouse of former fascist consul Nestore Prota had been assaulted and during the melee a young boy, Pasqualino Roda, was accidentally injured; farmer Antonio Ocello was accused of creating a group of fascist veterans in the North and was forced to play Russian roulette; priest don Giuseppe Rotella, who had taken a stand against violence, was beaten with maces.

=== Establishment ===
On 5 March 1945, Ercole Cavallaro was denounced and arrested by Carabinieri for the violent acts. Pressures of the father to free his son provoked the revolt in the town: on the following day, Cavallaro himself occupied the offices of telegraphs ad posts and the Carabinieri Reali barracks together with a group of loyalists.

When a red flag with hammer and sickle was hoisted on the bell tower of the local church, the "Red Republic of Caulonia" was proclaimed and the Italian Communist Party was immediately informed about that with a telegram. A internment camp for class enemies was established along with a people's court, and former fascist (identified as landowners) were prosecuted and punished. Ercole Cavallaro would be freed in the evening by Carabinieri. The uprising had quickly extended to the nearest comuni.

=== End ===
Before the arrival of police forces from Reggio Calabria, a group of "Caulonists" led by Ilario Bava entered in the house of priest Gennaro Amato (an old acquaintance of mayor Cavallaro when he was in seminary) and killed him.

Cavallaro realized the seriousness of the event and persuaded his men to turn themselves in to police on the next morning, but nonetheless the situation got worse and the news of the homicide was spread quickly in all Italy. For a few days, the alliance of anti-fascist forces was menaced by liberals who would leave the majority if communist leader Palmiro Togliatti did not condemn the acts of Caulonia, however the national PCI promptly disapproved the acts of Caulonists.

PCI Secretary for Reggio Calabria province, Eugenio Musolino and Prefetto Piolo convinced Cavallaro to interrupt the insurrection and give weapons in exchange for the clemency for rioters. Cavallaro described the chaotic situation as follows:

The insurrection, as never seen before in Calabria, with the centre in Caulonia, has stopped after achieving a superb satisfaction. There is only one dead. Fascists and reactionaries, all of them has understood the stop.

— Cavallaro

After the murder of Gennaro Amato, rioters had been quickly isolated and disarmed. PCI forced Cavallaro to resign on 15 April 1945 and he was then arrested.

Despite that, the event had a wide international resonance and Soviet leader Joseph Stalin said "a Cavallaro had to be in each city" during a broadcast on Radio Prague.

Journalist and novelist Corrado Alvaro had described the events as follows:

They passed by in mass singing anthems, waving boards, whirling around bates. [...] All together felt young, rulers of the street, in an historical representation, in a scene imitated by books that they had red.

— Corrado Alvaro, Mastrangelina

The experience of the Red Republic of Caulonia would be remembered by Pasquale Cavallaro in a poem in Calabrian dialect:

Poi ‘nta la guerra,
d’undi ca juntau,
‘nu sindacu sovieticu sciurtìu;
‘na repubblica russa ‘mminestràu,
e, comu fu lu fattu, scumparìu

— Pasquale Cavallaro

== Trial ==
On 23 June 1947, 365 rioters were accused before the Court of Locri for: creating armed bands, extortion, violence on private citizens, usurpation of public employment and homicide.

Thanks to the Togliatti amnesty, almost all of the rioters avoided prosecution except three people: Ilario Bava and Giuseppe Menno who were found guilty for the actual murder of Don Gennaro Amato, and Pasquale Cavallaro, instigator of the homicide. Shortly after the trial, many peasants were violently beaten while four workers died from torture and physical violence.

== Bibliography ==
- Cavallaro, Alessandro (1987). La rivoluzione di Caulonia. Spirali.
- Crupi, Pasquino (1977). La Repubblica rossa di Caulonia: una rivoluzione tradita?. Casa del libro.
- Misiani, Simone (1994). La repubblica di Caulonia. Rubbettino.
- Serri, Mirella (2008). I profeti disarmati. 1945-1948, la guerra fra le due sinistre. Corbaccio.
- Oliverio, Santino (2008). Il console e il professore. ISBN 978-88-7351-243-1.
