= James Dugald Somerville =

Australian historian

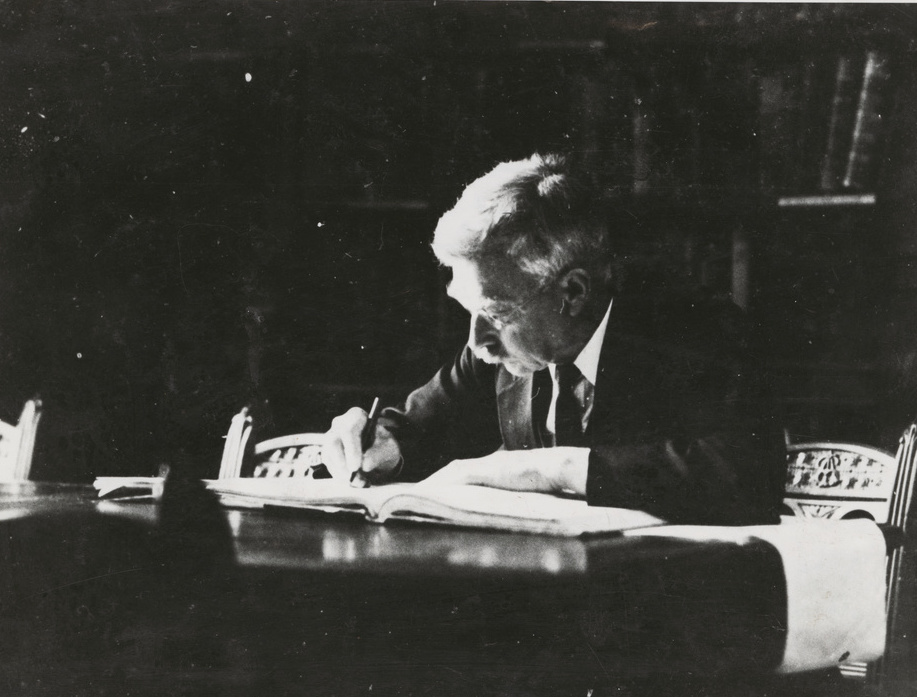
- Born: 1868; Glasgow
- Died: 1960

James Dugold Somerville (1868 – March 1960), born in Glasgow, was a South Australian historian with a special interest in Eyre's Peninsula, especially Port Lincoln.

== Background ==
Somerville was the third son of Peter Somerville (25 April 1834 – 8 January 1929) of Glasgow, floriculturist, and his wife Christina née Leitch (ca.1840 – 17 June 1923) whom he married in 1860 and with five children arrived in South Australia in the Saxon in May 1871, and settled at Glen Osmond, then Knoxville (modern day Glenside or Glenunga).

On 20 October 1896 he married Edith Tapley (1869–1971), a granddaughter of Thomas Tapley. They had one daughter, Mabel.

== Career ==
From June 1909 to September 1911, he was Superintendent and Resident Railway Engineer of the Darwin and Pine Creek railway.

He was Resident Railway Engineer for the South Australian Railways at Port Lincoln, and on his retirement in 1933 began the work for which he is known; beginning with the compilation of a large album of newspaper cuttings, extracts from books and other material. Then from October 1934 he contributed several hundreds of articles on historical themes to the Port Lincoln Times. He was able to enlist the assistance of a large number of private correspondents and public bodies, notably the Port Lincoln Council and the South Australian Archives.

He was secretary of the Historical Memorials committee of the Royal Geographical Society of South Australia.

== Donations ==
- He contributed a large number of historical books to the Port Lincoln Institute and some 120 items to the State Library of South Australia.
- In 1981 the Somerville Bequest of $250,000 was made to the Libraries Board of South Australia by his daughter Mabel in his honour.
- In 1987 the J. D. Somerville Oral History Collection of the State Library was founded, and named for him.
