= Flinders Park, South Australia =

Flinders Park
- Suburb
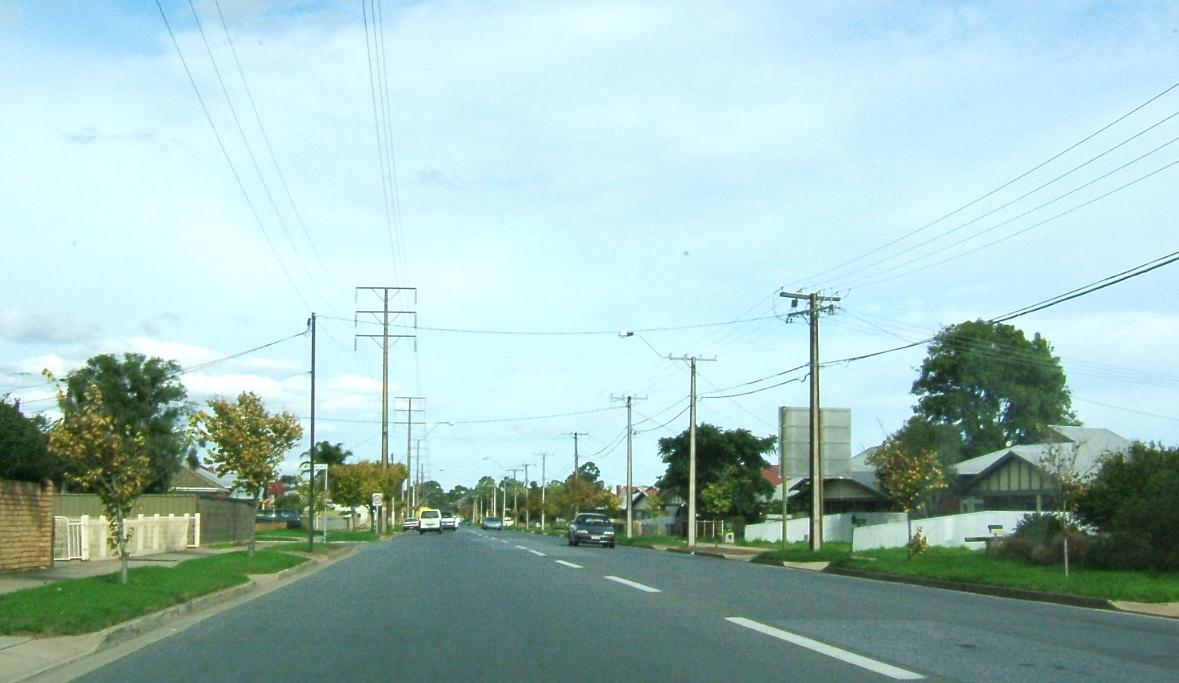
- Holbrooks Road

- Interactive map of Flinders Park
- Country: Australia
- State: South Australia
- City: Adelaide
- LGA: City of Charles Sturt
- Location: 5.3 km (3.3 mi) NW of Adelaide city centre

Government
  - State electorate: West Torrens
  - Federal divisions: Adelaide; Hindmarsh

Population
  - Total: 5,489 (SAL 2021)
- Postcode: 5025
Suburbs around Flinders Park
Findon	Findon, Beverley	Allenby Gardens
Kidman Park	Flinders Park	Allenby Gardens
Lockleys	Underdale, Lockleys	Torrensville

Flinders Park is a western suburb of Adelaide, South Australia. It is located in the City of Charles Sturt.

== History ==
The suburb is named after explorer Matthew Flinders, with many of its streets bearing the names of famous explorers.

== Geography ==
Flinders Park is bound by Grange Road to the north, the River Torrens to the south, Findon Rd to the west and Torres Ave and its extension southwards to the River Torrens, on the east.

== Demographics ==
The 2021 Census by the Australian Bureau of Statistics counted 5,489 persons in Flinders Park on census night. Of these, 50.1% were male and 49.9% were female.

The majority of residents (70.9%) are of Australian birth, with other common census responses being India (4.2%), Italy (3.4%), England (2.1%), Greece (1.9%), and China (1.0%). Additionally, people of Aboriginal and/or Torres Strait Islander descent made up 0.9% of the suburb.

In terms of religious affiliation, 31.4% attributed themselves to being irreligious, 27.9% of residents attributed themselves to being Catholic, 10.5% attributed themselves to be Eastern Orthodox, and 4.7% attributed themselves to being Anglican. At the 2016 Census, 94.4% of the residents were employed within Flinders Park, with the remaining 5.6% being unemployed.

== Politics ==
=== Local government ===
Flinders Park is part of Beverley Ward in the City of Charles Sturt local government area, being represented in that council by Independent Edgar Agius and Matt Mitchell.

=== State and federal ===
Flinders Park lies in the state electoral district of West Torrens and the federal electoral division of Hindmarsh and Adelaide. The suburb is represented in the South Australian House of Assembly by Tom Koutsantonis and federally by Labor MPs Steve Georganas(Adelaide) and Mark Butler(Hindmarsh).

== Community ==
=== Schools ===
Flinders Park Primary School, a government school, is located on Holbrooks Road. Additionally, a newly created R-12 co-ed Catholic school, Nazareth Catholic College, was formed in 2007 following the merger of three local Catholic primary schools (Cardinia (Flinders Park), Mater Christi (Seaton) and Our Lady of the Manger (Findon)), and girls' secondary school (Siena College, Findon). The primary campus is located on the site of the former Our Lady of the Manger and Siena schools, while the secondary campus is located on Holbrooks Road at Flinders Park, adjacent the River Torrens.

== Facilities and attractions ==
=== Parks ===
The largest greenspace in the suburb is Torrens Linear Park, lying along the River Torrens. The reserve of Flinders Park is located between Hartley Road and Flinders Parade. Other small reserves, such as 'Pooch Park' Tedder Reserve, Gerard Reserve and Flinders Park no.1.

=== Football Club ===
The pride of the suburb is the Flinders Park Football Club located on Hartley Road. The team colours are Red, Gold and Blue. The club also fields a cricket team in the summer months.

=== Netball Club ===
Associated with the football club, the Flinders Park Netball Clubs enters teams in the Open Women's competitions at SAUCNA.

== Transportation ==
=== Roads ===
Flinders Park is serviced by Grange Road, linking the suburb to Adelaide city centre and the coast, and by Findon Road, which forms its western boundary. Holbrooks Road divides the east of the suburb.

=== Public transport ===
Flinders Park is serviced by public transport run by the Adelaide Metro.

==== Buses ====
The suburb is serviced by buses run by the Adelaide Metro.

== See also ==
- List of Adelaide suburbs
