= Grange, South Australia =

Grange
- Suburb
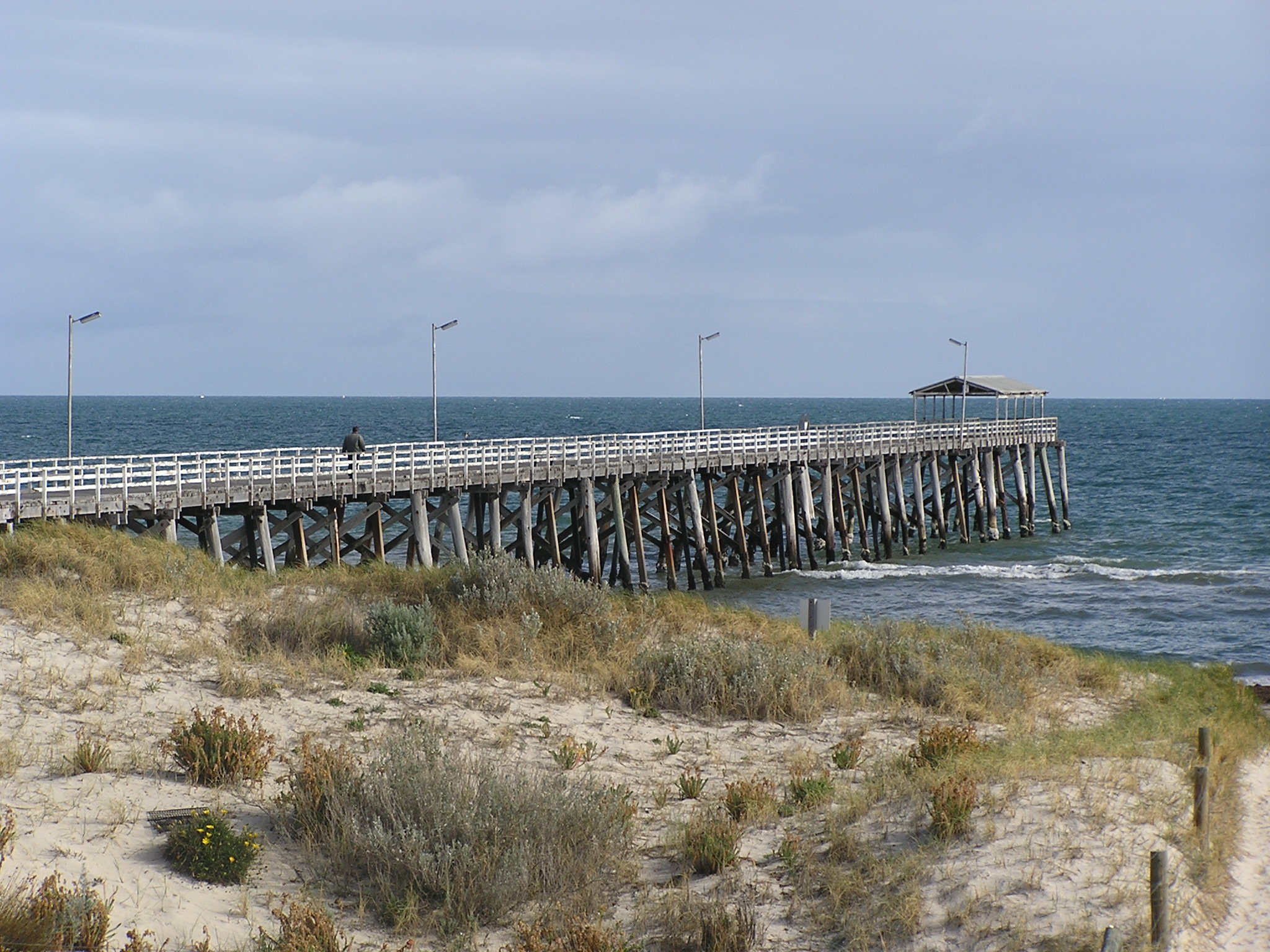
- Grange Jetty

- Coordinates: 34°54′08″S 138°29′45″E
- Country: Australia
- State: South Australia
- City: Adelaide
- LGA: City of Charles Sturt
- Location: 11 km (6.8 mi) W of Adelaide city centre
- Established: 1878

Government
  - State electorate: Lee
  - Federal division: Hindmarsh

Population
  - Total: 6,143 (SAL 2021)
- Time zone: UTC+9:30 (ACST)
  - Summer (DST): UTC+10:30 (ACST)
- Postcode: 5022
- Mean max temp: 21.6 °C (70.9 °F)
- Mean min temp: 11.5 °C (52.7 °F)
- Annual rainfall: 439.9 mm (17.32 in)
Suburbs around Grange
	Tennyson; West Lakes	Seaton
West Lakes; Tennyson; Gulf St Vincent	Grange	Seaton
Gulf St Vincent	Henley Beach; Fulham Gardens	Fulham Gardens

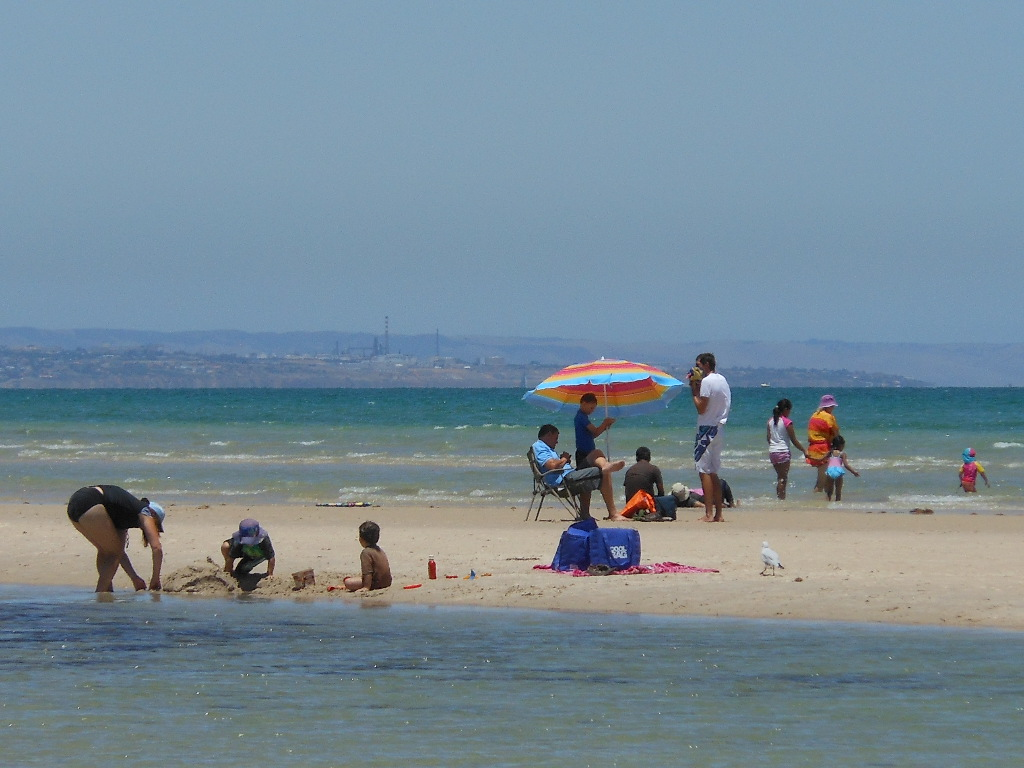
Grange Beach in summer

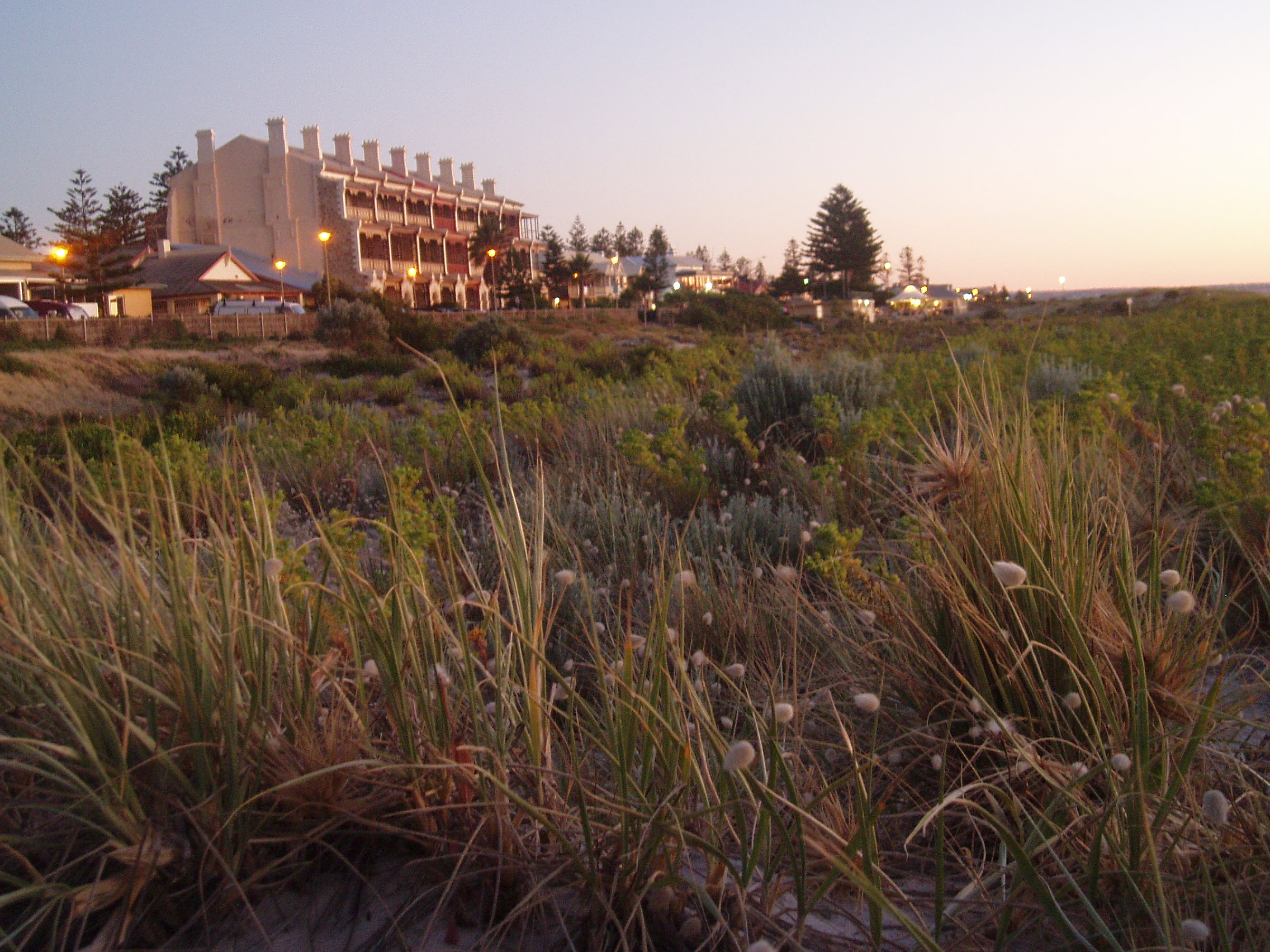
Southeast-facing view of the historic Marine Apartments over the coastal sand dune north of Grange jetty

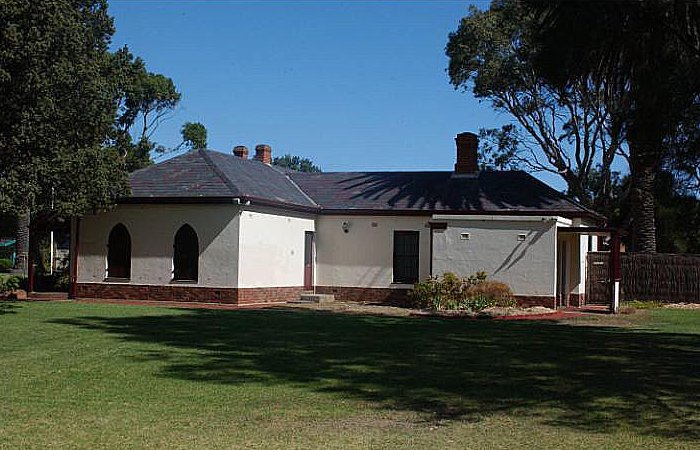
The Grange, Charles Sturt's cottage

Grange is a coastal suburb of the City of Charles Sturt, in Adelaide, South Australia, located about 11 kilometres (6.8 mi) from the Adelaide city centre. The suburb is named after Captain Charles Sturt's cottage, built in 1840–41, which still stands and is now a museum. In addition to Grange Beach, the suburb has several parks and reserves, as well as the Grange Hotel, which was originally licensed in 1881.

== Geography ==
Grange is a suburb with partial frontage to Gulf St Vincent located about 11 kilometres (6.8 mi) west of the Adelaide city centre. Its land boundaries (in clockwise order from the north-west) are Fort Street, Military Road, Trimmer Parade, Sportsmans Drive, Brebner Drive, Frederick Road and Grange Road.

== History ==
Originally called The Grange, the suburb is named after Captain Charles Sturt's cottage, which originally stood on 500 acres (200 ha) of farmland. Sturt's farm was subdivided in 1878 by a private company intending to establish a beach resort. The cottage still stands and is now a museum.

The name was adopted in 1945 by the local government area of the Town of Henley and Grange following agreement between it and the state's Nomenclature Committee and other government agencies. Boundaries were also established in 1945 over that portion of the Town of Henley and Grange located north of Kirkcaldy Beach Road.

On 30 September 1976, its boundaries were revised along with adjoining suburbs including Tennyson and the new suburb of West Lakes.

On 19 November 2009, land bounded by Trimmer Parade, Sportsmans Drive, Brebner Drive and Frederick Road was removed from the adjoining suburb of Seaton and added to the northern side of Grange following a proposal put forward by a resident group associated with the "Grange Golf Course Estate" and sponsored by the City of Charles Sturt.

== Demographics ==
The 2006 Census by the Australian Bureau of Statistics counted 5,238 persons in Grange on census night. Of these, 47.1% were male and 52.9% were female. The majority of residents (77.1%) are of Australian birth, with an additional 5.9% naming England as their country of birth.

The age distribution of Grange residents is slightly older than that of the broader Australian population. In 2006, 72% of residents were over 25 years old, compared with the national average of 66.5%, while 28% were under 25, compared with the Australian average of 33.5%.

In 2019 the population had decreased to 4542.

The 2021 Census counted a total of 6143 persons. Of these 48% were male and 52% were female. The median age of Grange's population was 49.

== Governance ==
Grange is part of Grange Ward in the City of Charles Sturt local government area, being represented in that council by Tom Scheffler and Rachel Tullio.

Grange is in the state electoral district of Lee and the federal electoral division of Hindmarsh.

== Community ==
The local newspaper is the Weekly Times Messenger.

=== Community groups ===
A community centre is located on Charles Sturt Avenue.

=== Schools ===
Grange Primary School is located on Jetty Street.

== Facilities and attractions ==
Grange Jetty, built in 1879, lies midway along Grange Beach. The Grange Hotel, located on the esplanade overlooking Grange Beach, was originally licensed in 1881.

=== Parks ===
In addition to Grange Beach, the suburb has several parks and reserves. Grange Recreation Reserve is located in the northwest of the suburb and offers a playing field and playground. Playgrounds are also located in Lines Reserve, on Lines Street, and Kirkcaldy Park, on Kirkcaldy Avenue. The greenspace in the centre of the suburb is notable as being the location of Charles Sturt's still-extant cottage.

=== Sport ===
The Grange Golf Club is in Grange and held the LIV Golf Adelaide tournament.

=== Museum ===
The Charles Sturt Museum is based in Sturt's former home The Grange, which was saved from demolition by being bought by the council in 1956. The museum illustrates his story with "not only ... displays of relics, but interpretive and multimedia displays".

== Transportation ==
=== Roads ===
Grange is serviced by Grange Road, connecting the suburb to Adelaide city centre. Seaview Road and Military Road link Grange to several of Adelaide's other coastal suburbs. Frederick Road, on the suburb's eastern boundary, connects the suburb with the shopping and entertainment facilities in West Lakes.

=== Public transport ===
Grange is serviced by public transport buses and trains run by the Adelaide Metro. Both Grange and East Grange railway stations on the Grange railway line are in the suburb of Grange. In 1894, the line was extended for a further 2.8 kilometres (1.7 miles) to terminate at Henley Beach, but it was removed in 1957–58 because the track ran along the increasingly busy Military Road.

== See also ==
- List of Adelaide suburbs
