= Grange Road, Adelaide =

Arterial road in South Australia

Grange Road South Australia
- Coordinates: 34.907628°S 138.490417°E (West end); 34.904396°S 138.565637°E (East end)

General information
- Type: Road
- Location: Adelaide
- Length: 6.8 km (4.2 mi)
- Route number(s): A14 (1998–present) (through Beverley)

Major junctions
- West end: Esplanade; Grange, South Australia
- Tapleys Hill Road; Holbrooks Road; East Avenue
- East end: Manton Street; West Hindmarsh, South Australia

Location(s)
- Region: Western Adelaide
- Major suburbs: Findon, Allenby Gardens

Grange Road is an arterial road in the western suburbs of Adelaide, South Australia. It runs from the coast at Grange to South Road, close to the city centre.

== Route ==
Grange Road commences from Esplanade at Grange, on the Adelaide foreshore, and heads east, crossing Tapleys Hill Road between Seaton and Fulham Gardens, and the East Avenue-Holbrooks Road dog-leg through Flinders Park, before eventually ending at the intersection with South Road in West Hindmarsh.

The eastern end of Grange Road crosses the North-South Motorway trench as Manton Street, which passes Hindmarsh Stadium, behind the Adelaide Entertainment Centre, then joins the City Ring Route at Port Road and Park Terrace via a short stretch of Adam Street.

== History ==
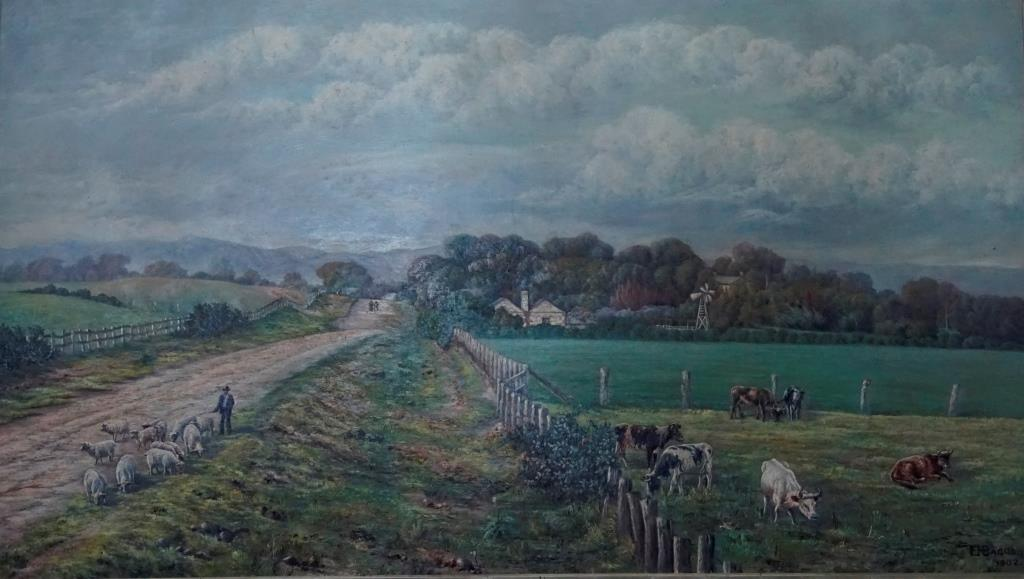
Grange Road, painting by Edmund Baggs in 1902

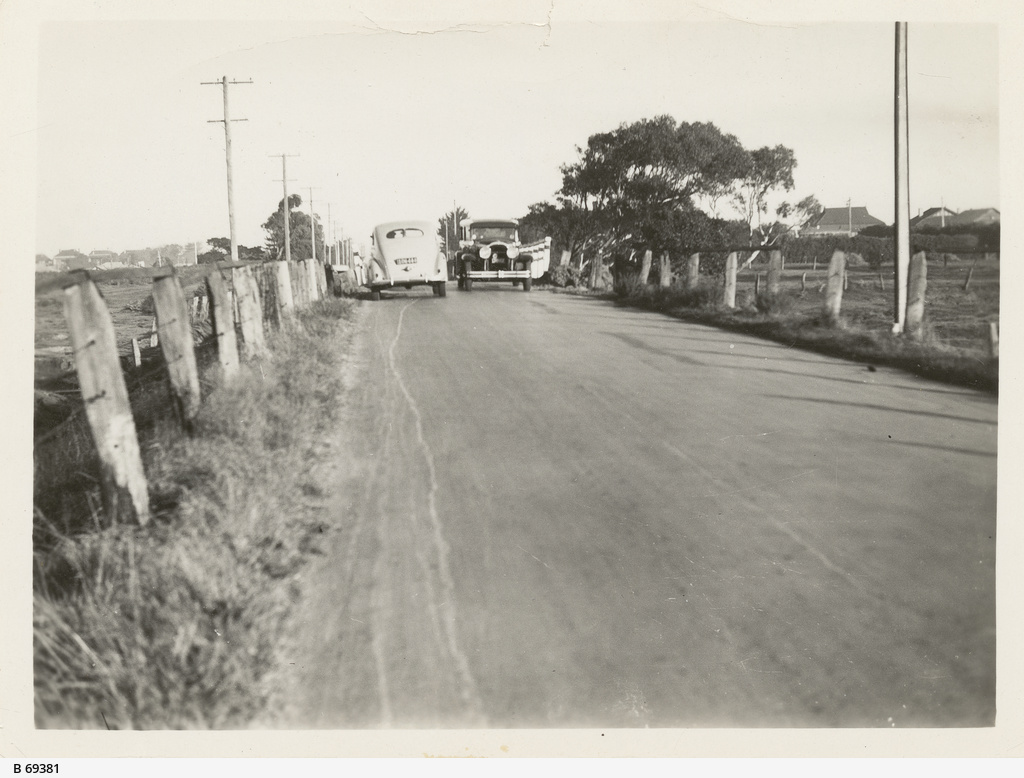
Two cars passing one another on Grange Road, Grange, looking west towards the sea. Houses in Surrey Street are on the right.

Between 1894 and 1957, the Henley Beach railway line followed the west side of Military Road and crossed what is now Grange Road. Kirkcaldy railway station was immediately south of Grange Road.

The 1936 Gregory's Street Directory showed that west of Tapleys Hill Road, Grange Road continued as Kircaldy Beach Road, and the area where it ended was known at that time as Kircaldy. The 1940 Fuller's directory shows Grange Road to the bridge over the Port River and Kirkcaldy Road from there to the Esplanade. Today, the bridge is just a culvert or stormwater drain, and there is only an open channel for the river downstream (north) of Grange Road.

In 2023, the state government announced that in 2025 it intends to upgrade the two intersections with Holbrooks Road and East Avenue (together, State Route A14) by realigning those two roads into a single intersection, and widen Grange Road in that area. Work on the project by Seymour Whyte commenced in March 2025.

Traffic volume increases from west to east. There are estimated to be 10,000 vehicles per day near Military Road, 22,300 west of Tapleys Hill Road, 25,100 east of Tapleys Hill Road, 26,500 east of Findon Road, 33,000 west of Holbrooks Road and 34,000 between East Avenue and South Road. Traffic between Holbrooks and East Avenue is not separately reported, but they carry 19,000 and 12,100 vehicles respectively.

== Major intersections ==
Grange Road is entirely contained within the City of Charles Sturt local government area.

Location	km	mi	Destinations	Notes
Grange–Henley Beach boundary	0.0	0.0	Esplanade – Grange	Western end of road
Grange–Henley Beach boundary	0.1	0.062	Seaview Road – West Beach	
Grange–Henley Beach boundary	0.2	0.12	Military Road – Tennyson, Semaphore Park, Largs North	
Seaton–Fulham Gardens boundary	2.2	1.4	Tapleys Hill Road (A15) – Fulham Gardens, Glenelg, Port Noarlunga	
Beverley–Flinders Park boundary	5.6	3.5	Holbrooks Road (A14 south) – Underdale	Route A14 continues east along Grange Road
Beverley–Flinders Park–Allenby Gardens tripoint	5.7	3.5	East Avenue (A14 north) – Beverley	Route A14 continues north along East Avenue
West Hindmarsh–Hindmarsh boundary	6.8	4.2	South Road – Regency Park, Wingfield, to North-South Motorway – Wingfield, Waterloo Corner	
West Hindmarsh–Hindmarsh boundary	6.8	4.2	Manton Street – Hindmarsh	Eastern terminus of road
Route transition
