= Kidman Park, South Australia =

Kidman Park
- Suburb
- Interactive map of Kidman Park
- Country: Australia
- State: South Australia
- City: Adelaide
- LGA: City of Charles Sturt
- Location: 6.7 km (4.2 mi) W of Adelaide city centre
- Established: 1954

Government
  - State electorate: Colton (2011)
  - Federal division: Hindmarsh (2011)

Population
  - Total: 3,874 (SAL 2021)
- Postcode: 5025
Suburbs around Kidman Park
Seaton	Findon	Findon
Fulham Gardens	Kidman Park	Flinders Park
Fulham Gardens	Lockleys	Lockleys

Kidman Park is a western suburb of Adelaide, South Australia. It lies within the City of Charles Sturt council area.

== History ==
Once owned by the eponymous pastoralist, Sidney Kidman, Kidman Park was established in 1954 by the South Australian Housing Trust.

=== St. James ===
In June 2023, South Australian property developer Fairland Group announced a masterplanned community named St. James. It is slated for the site of a former Metcash distribution centre at the southeastern edge of Kidman Park.

The development area is bounded by Valetta Road to the north, Findon Road to the east, the River Torrens and Linear Park to the south, and a number of residential cul-de-sacs to the west. Approximately 400 homes will form the development, offering predominantly detached two-storey homes and apartments.

==== Precincts ====
St. James will comprise six distinct precincts, intended to section the development by character and composition.

- Valetta Promenade — the primary thoroughfare connecting Valetta Road to the development with larger homes offering greater street presence.
- St James Place — set to be the hub of St. James with a mix of commercial spaces and apartments on the corner of Valetta and Findon Roads.
- Central Park — oriented towards Findon Road with smaller lots and apartments set around a central reserve.
- Veneti Place — set deeper within the development adjacent existing cul-de-sacs to the west, its name takes inspiration from early Venetian immigrants who resided in Kidman Park.
- Greenwood — adjacent to the River Torrens Linear Park, narrower "terrace" allotments will take advantage of views over the river and the existing landscape.
- Keele Bridge — a small retail precinct set to integrate with apartments and townhouses, its name takes inspiration from the bridge that connects Findon and Rowells Road across the River Torrens, opened in 1937.

== Geography ==
Kidman Park lies between Grange Road and the River Torrens. Findon Road forms the suburb's eastern boundary.

== Demographics ==
The 2016 Census by the Australian Bureau of Statistics counted 3,380 persons in Kidman Park on census night. Of these, 48.8% were male and 51.2% were female.

The majority of residents (21.1%) are of Italian background, with other common census responses being Australian (17.6%), Greece (7.9%) and England (19.2%).

The age distribution of Kidman Park residents is skewed higher than the greater Australian population. 75.4% of residents were over 25 years in 2016, compared to the Australian average of 68.8%; and 24.6% were younger than 25 years, compared to the Australian average of 31.2%.

== Politics ==
=== Local government ===
Kidman Park is part of Findon Ward in the City of Charles Sturt local government area, being represented in that council by Doriana Coppola and Joe Ienco.

=== State and federal ===
Kidman Park lies in the state electoral district of Colton and the federal electoral division of Hindmarsh. The suburb is represented in the South Australian House of Assembly by Paul Caica and federally by Matt Williams.

== Community ==
=== Schools ===
Kidman Park Primary School is located on Dean Avenue. It was founded in 1967.

== Facilities and attractions ==
=== Parks ===
Collins Reserve is located on Valetta Road. Linear Park extends along the River Torrens on the suburbs southern boundary.

The Fulham Cricket Club has its home at Collins Reserve. It is a cricket club in the western suburbs of Adelaide. The Club fields several senior and junior teams with the red, white and black colours and Falcon emblem.

== Transportation ==
=== Roads ===
Kidman Park is serviced by Findon Road and Grange Road, the latter connecting the suburb to Adelaide city centre.

=== Public transport ===
Kidman Park is serviced by public transport run by the Adelaide Metro. buses run on findon road, grange road, valetta road and tapleys hill road.

=== Bicycle routes ===
A combined pedestrian and bicycle path lies along Linear Park, Collins Reserve and the Torrens River.

== See also ==
- List of Adelaide suburbs
