= Underdale, South Australia =

Underdale
- Suburb
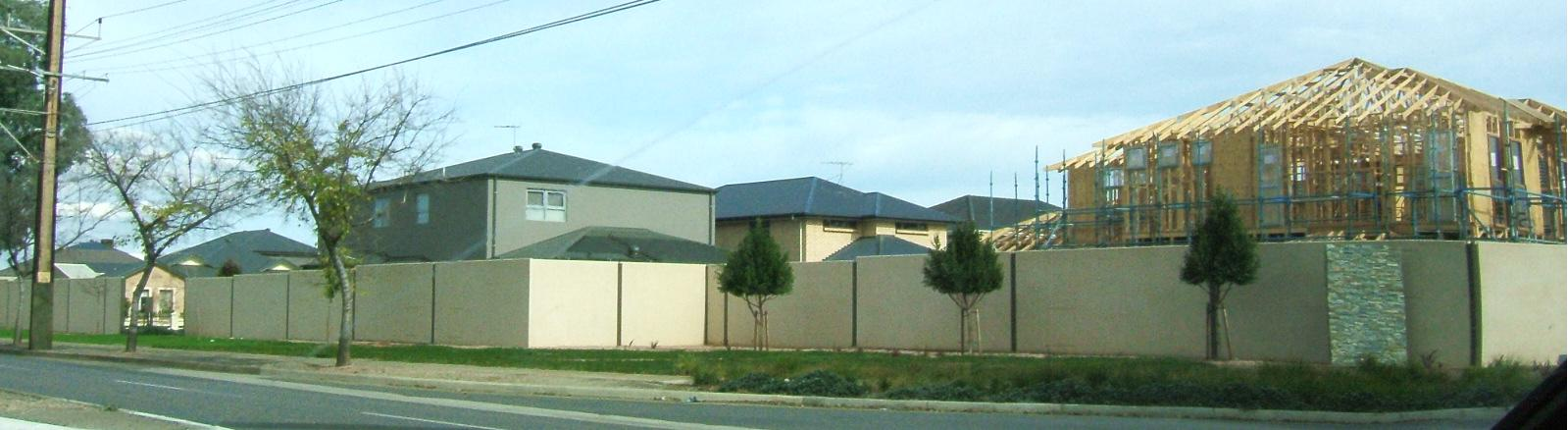
- Housing developments on what was a campus of the University of South Australia

- Country: Australia
- State: South Australia
- City: Adelaide
- LGA: City of West Torrens
- Location: 2 km (1.2 mi) from Adelaide

Government
  - State electorate: West Torrens
  - Federal division: Hindmarsh

Population
  - Total: 2,429 (SAL 2021)
- Postcode: 5032
Suburbs around Underdale
Flinders Park	Flinders Park	Flinders Park
Lockleys	Underdale	Torrensville
Brooklyn Park	Brooklyn Park	Torrensville

Underdale is a western suburb of South Australia's capital city Adelaide. It sits between Henley Beach Road and the River Torrens. It is largely residential with a very small industrial section on the eastern side of Holbrook's Road near the river.

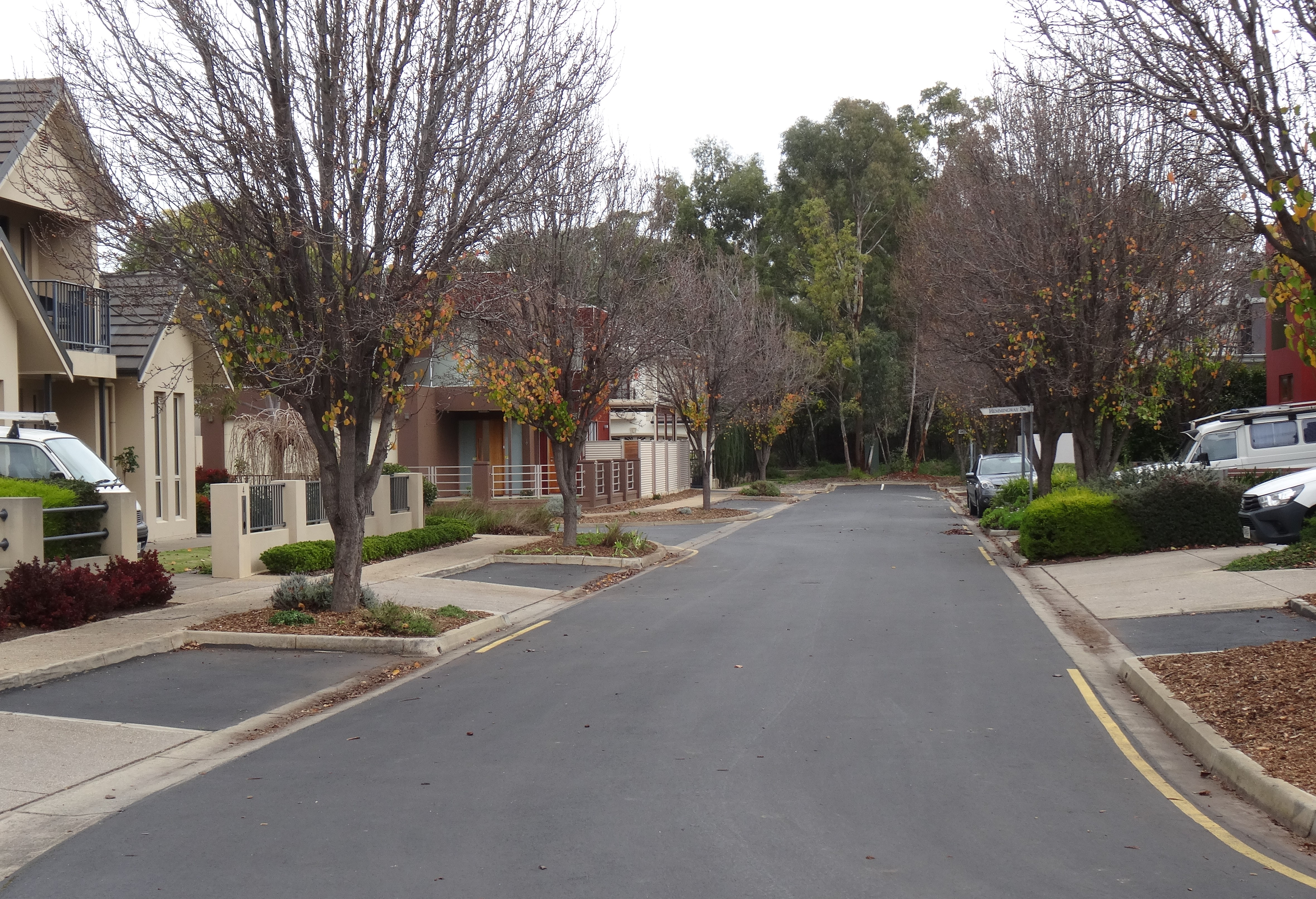
A residential street in Underdale

Underdale High School sits within the suburb; its alumni include cricket player David Hookes and Australian soccer player Tony Vidmar.

Australian Bureau of Statistics data from May 2021 identified Adelaide's western suburbs as having the lowest unemployment rate in South Australia.

St Marks Lutheran Church is in Underdale.

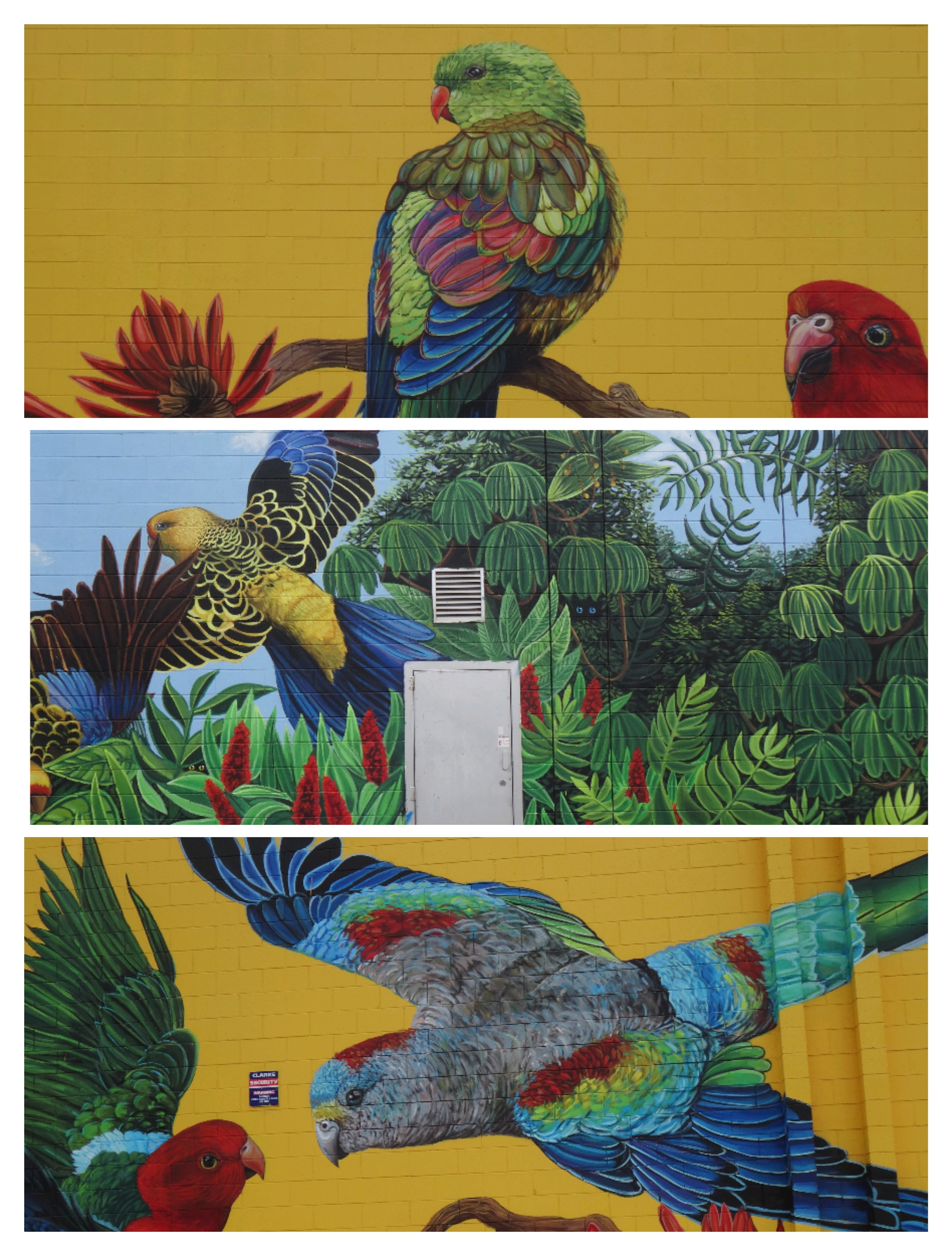
Wall art in the Underdale industrial area

== History ==
Underdale Post Office first opened on 1 January 1867 and closed around 1874. It was reopened in 1937 and closed in 1993.

== See also ==
- List of Adelaide suburbs
