= Fulham Gardens, South Australia =

Fulham Gardens
- Suburb
- Country: Australia
- State: South Australia
- City: Adelaide
- LGA: City of Charles Sturt
- Location: 8 km (5.0 mi) west of Adelaide city centre

Government
  - State electorate: Colton (2011)
  - Federal division: Hindmarsh (2011)

Population
  - Total: 6,573 (SAL 2021)
- Postcode: 5024
Suburbs around Fulham Gardens
Grange	Seaton	Seaton
Henley Beach	Fulham Gardens	Kidman Park
Henley Beach	Fulham	Lockleys

Fulham Gardens is a western suburb of Adelaide, South Australia in the City of Charles Sturt.

== Geography ==
The suburb is on Tapleys Hill Road, with Grange Road as its northern boundary.

== Demographics ==
The 2021 census by the Australian Bureau of Statistics counted 6,573 persons in Fulham Gardens on census night. Of these, 48% were male and 52% were female.

The majority of residents (67.4%) are of Australian birth, with other common census responses being Italy (5.4%), Greece (3.3%) and India (3.3%).

The age distribution of Fulham Gardens residents is skewed higher than the greater Australian population. 73.1% of residents were over 25 years in 2021, compared to the Australian average of 69.8%; and 26.9% were younger than 25 years, compared to the Australian average of 30.2%.

== Politics ==
=== Local government ===
Fulham Gardens is part of Henley and Findon wards in the City of Charles Sturt local government area, being represented in that council by Jim Fitzpatrick and Robert Randall (Henley) and by Doriana Coppola and Joe Ienco (Findon).

=== State and federal ===
Fulham Gardens lies in the state electoral district of Colton and the federal electoral division of Adelaide. The suburb is represented in the South Australian House of Assembly by Paul Caica and federally by Steve Georganas.

== Facilities and attractions ==
=== Parks ===
As well as a small portion of Torrens Linear Park in the southeast, there are several small parks and reserves scattered thought the suburb.

Fulham Gardens shares Collins Reserve with neighbouring Kidman Park.

== Transportation ==
=== Roads ===
Fulham Gardens is serviced by Tapleys Hill Road, bisecting the suburb from north to south, and Grange Road, connecting the suburb to Adelaide city centre and the coast.

=== Public transport ===
Fulham Gardens is serviced by public transport run by the Adelaide Metro.

==== Buses ====
The suburb is serviced by the following bus routes:

- 300
- 110, 112
- 287, 288
- H30
- H33

== See also ==
- List of Adelaide suburbs
