= Henley Beach, South Australia =

Henley Beach
- Suburb
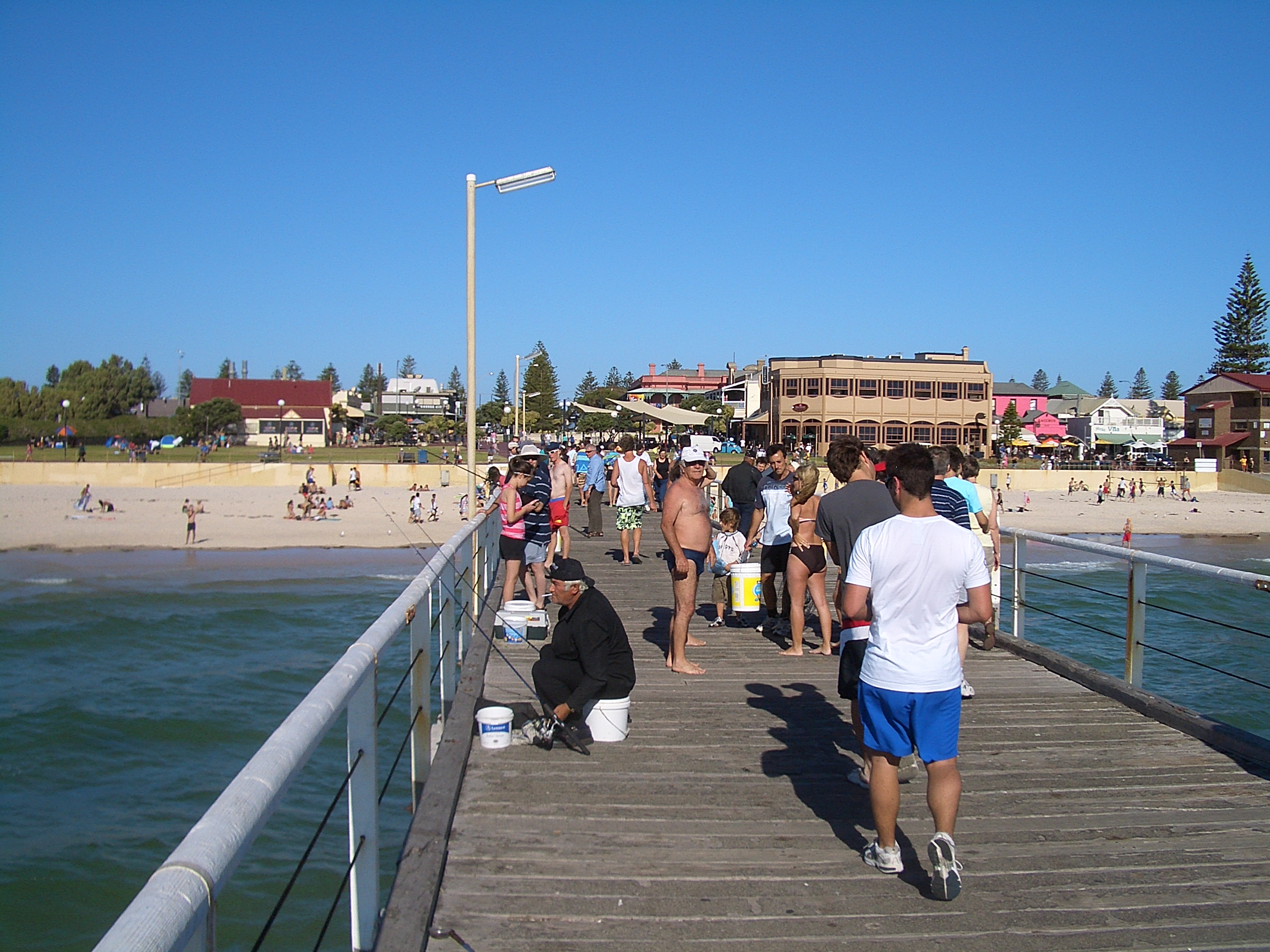
- Henley Beach jetty

- Country: Australia
- State: South Australia
- City: Adelaide
- LGA: City of Charles Sturt
- Location: 9.7 km (6.0 mi) W of Adelaide city centre
- Established: c. 1860

Government
  - State electorate: Colton (2011)
  - Federal division: Hindmarsh (2011)

Area
  - Total: 2.5 km^{2} (0.97 sq mi)

Population
  - Total: 6,259 (SAL 2021)
- Postcode: 5022
Suburbs around Henley Beach
	Grange	Grange
Gulf St Vincent	Henley Beach	Fulham Gardens
	Henley Beach South	Fulham

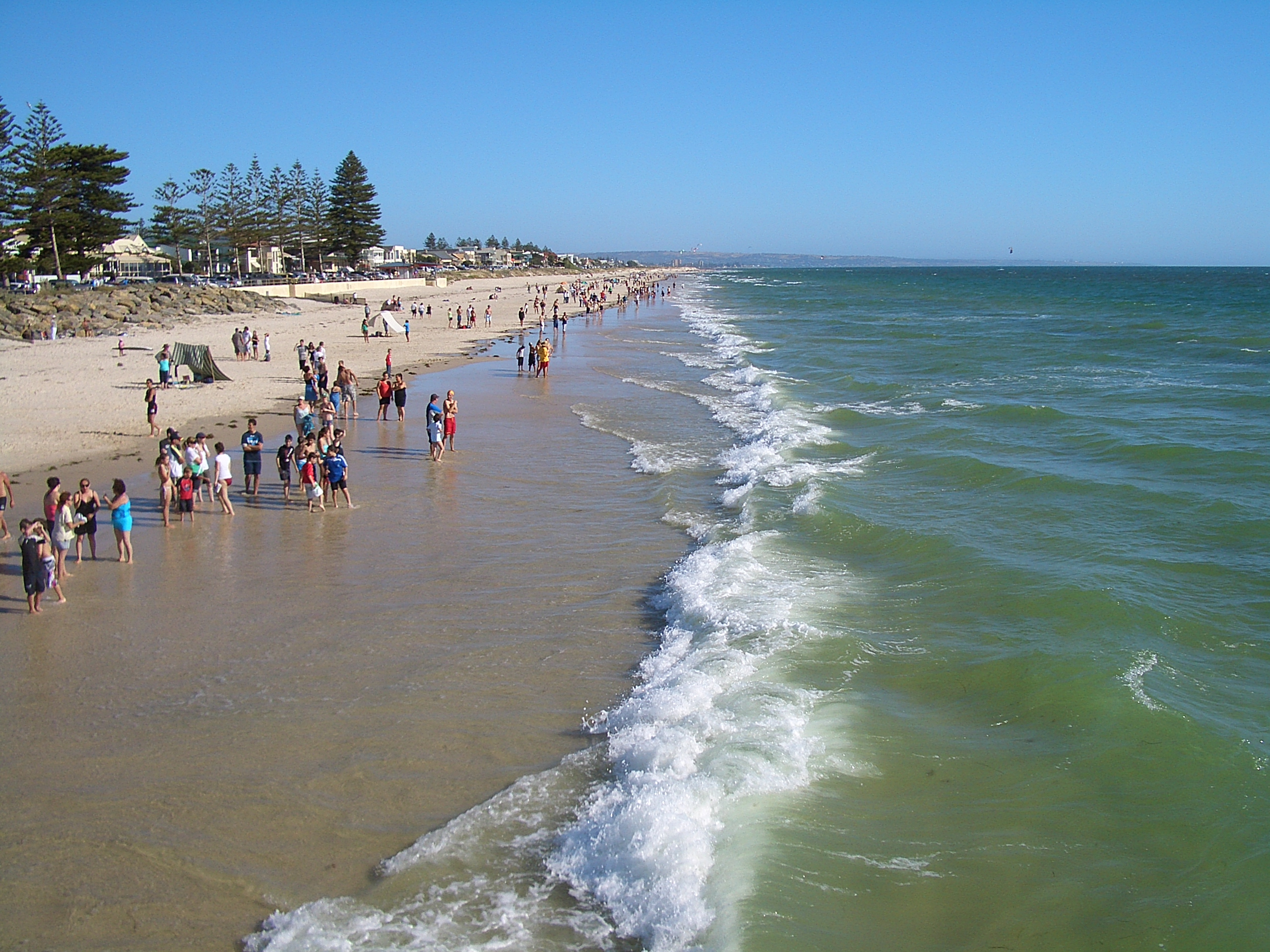
Henley Beach at Henley Beach

Henley Beach is a coastal suburb of Adelaide, South Australia in the City of Charles Sturt, which draws its name from Henley-on-Thames, England.

== History ==
The land where Henley Beach stands, sections 448 and 2080 in the Hundred of Yatala, was initially granted to William Bartley on 1 November 1850. Bartley later sold the land to James Macgeorge in August 1873. In May 1877, Arthur Harvey, Henry S. Anthony, and William P. Wicksteed acquired the land and proceeded to develop the town of Henley Beach.

While admitted to be one of the finest in the colony, it has been somewhat neglected owing to the road not being made. The District Council and private enterprise, however, have overcome this...

— The Manning Index of South Australian History.

== Geography ==
Henley Beach lies between the suburbs of West Beach and Grange.

== Demographics ==
The 2021 Census by the Australian Bureau of Statistics counted 6,259 persons in Henley Beach on census night. Of these, 49.4% were male and 50.6% were female.

Aboriginal and Torres Strait Islander people make up 1.1% of the population. The most common ancestries in Woodville West were English (39.4%), Australian (31.7%), Irish (10.7%), Italian (10.6%) and Scottish (9.2%). The majority of residents (77.3%) are of Australian birth, with a further 5.7% identifying England as their country of origin. The most common religious affiliations in Woodville West were No Religion (43.3%), Catholic (26%), Anglican (7.9%), Eastern Orthodox (4.5%) and Uniting Church (4.3%).

85.5% of the population stated they only speak English at home. The next most common languages were Greek (2.5%), Italian (1.9%) and Serbian, Afrikaans and Portuguese (0.5% each).

== Governance ==
=== Local government ===
Henley Beach is part of Henley Ward in the City of Charles Sturt local government area, being represented in that council by Kenzie Van den Nieuwelaar and Paul Sykes. It was part of the City of Henley and Grange from 1915 until 1997 when the council merged with the City of Hindmarsh Woodville to create the present City of Charles Sturt.

=== State and federal ===
Henley Beach lies in the state electoral district of Colton and the federal electoral division of Hindmarsh. The suburb is represented in the South Australian House of Assembly by Paul Caica and federally by Steve Georganas.

== Amenities ==
Henley Square is located behind Henley Jetty on the Esplanade. Other greenspaces in the suburb is the Henley Grange Memorial Oval and John Mitchell Oval. Henley Beach extends the length of the suburb.

There are several schools in the suburb, including: Fulham Gardens Primary School, Fulham North Primary School, Henley High School, St Michael's College, and Star of the Sea School.

The Catholic Church in the suburb is dedicated to Our Lady of the Sacred Heart.

== Transport ==
Henley Beach is serviced by Grange Road and Henley Beach Road, both connecting the suburb to Adelaide City Centre. Seaview Road runs along the coast.

Henley Beach is serviced by public transport run by the Adelaide Metro which provides bus services to the Adelaide city centre and Glenelg. The Grange railway line was extended to Henley Beach as the Henley Beach railway line in 1894 and the extension closed in 1957. There was a tram line from the city centre to Henley Beach. This was initially a horse-drawn tram, converted to electricity in 1909 and ceased operation on 2 February 1957 after F1 type tram 253 ran the last service, along with the through-routed Kensington Gardens line.

== Gallery ==
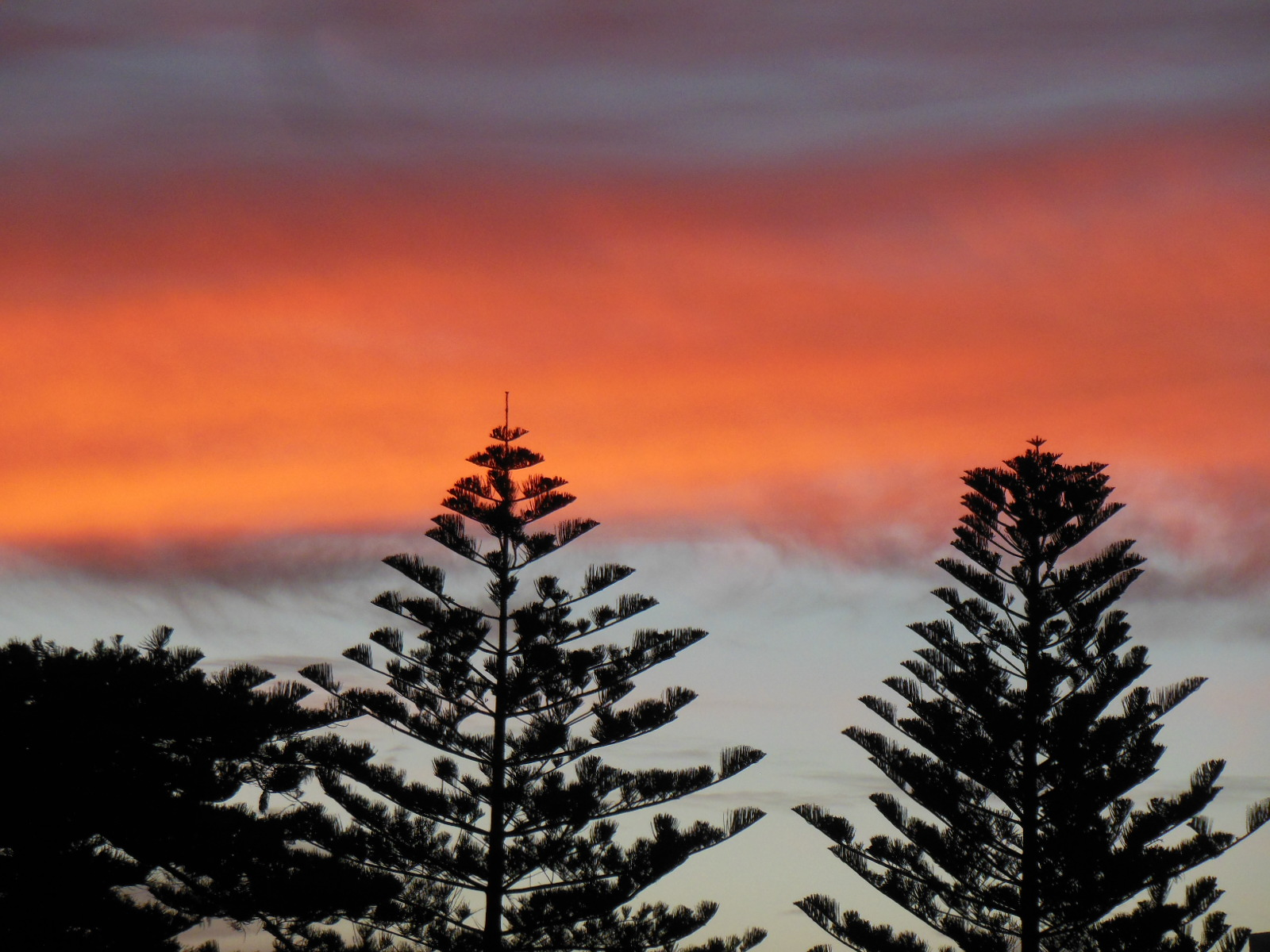
Araucaria trees at Henley Beach

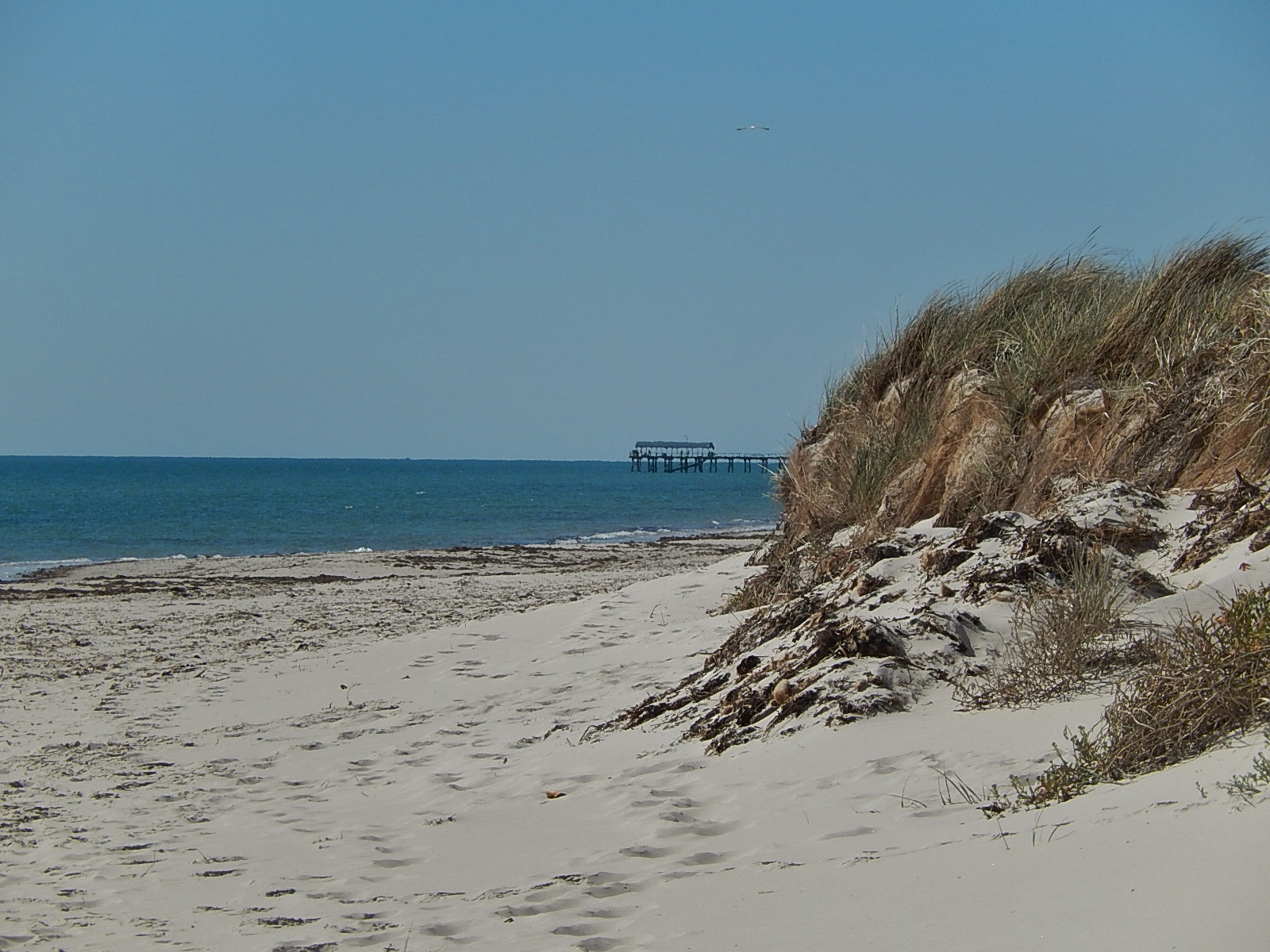
Henley Beach jetty

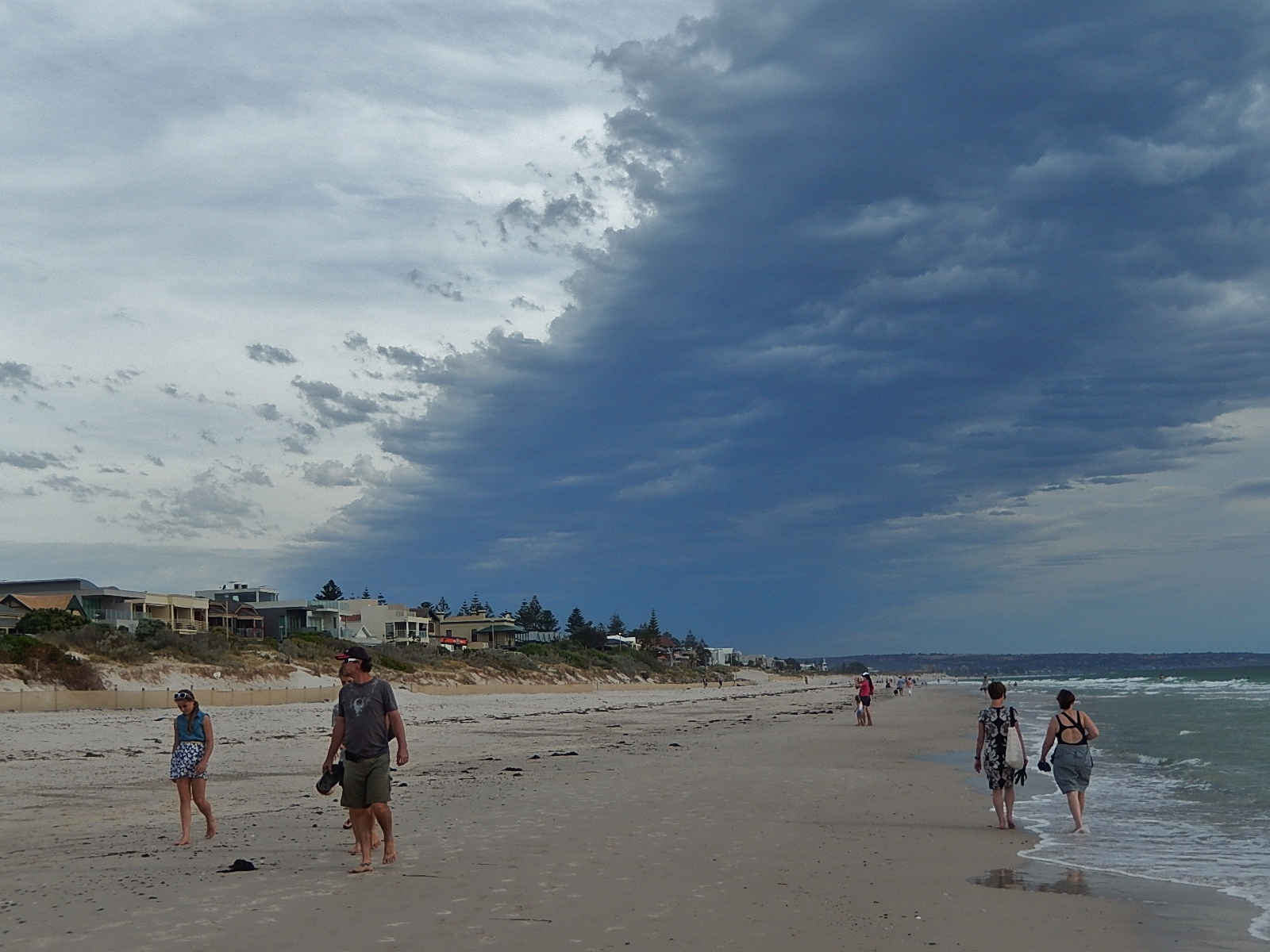
Cloudy summer weather

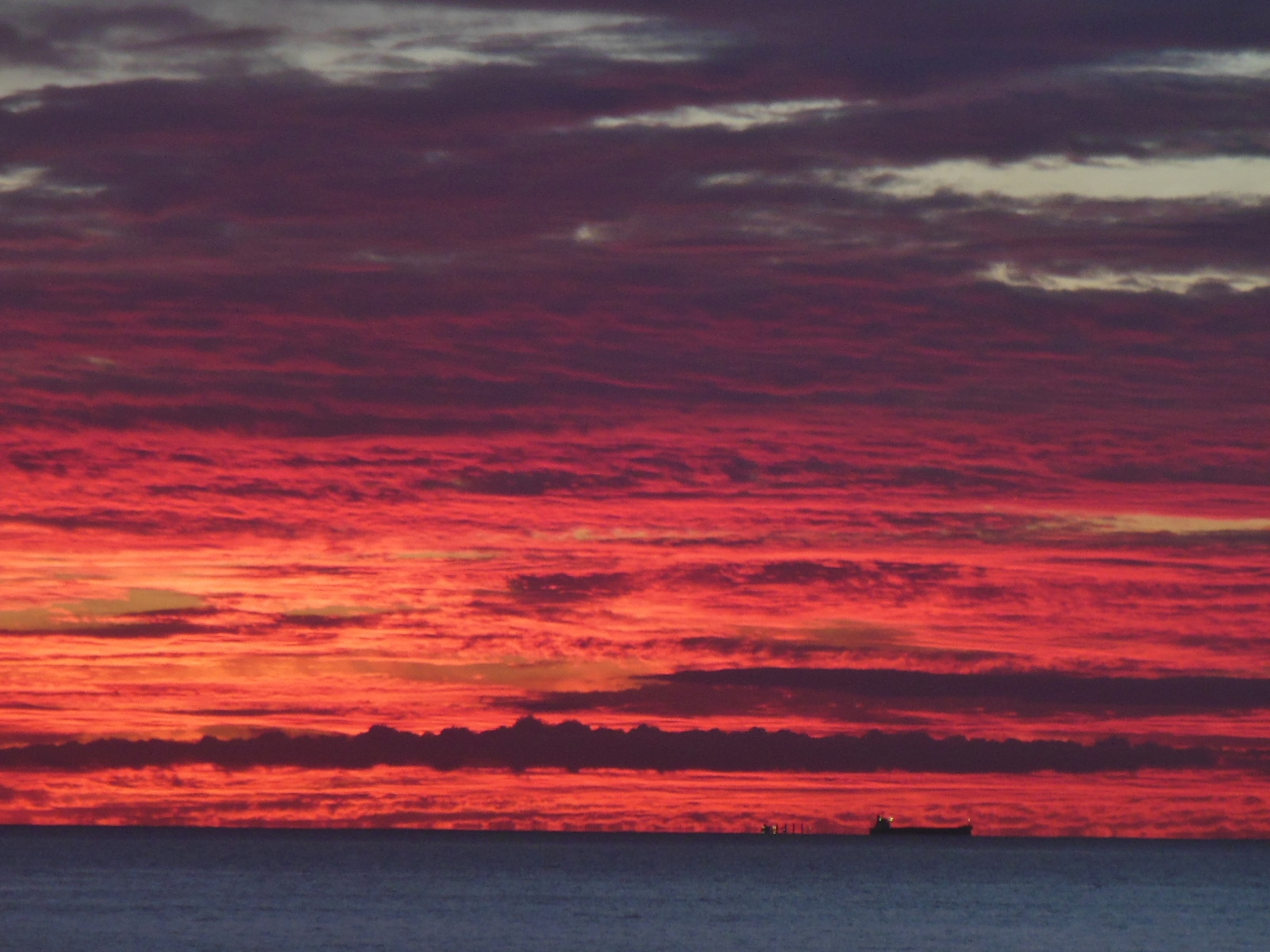
Sunset

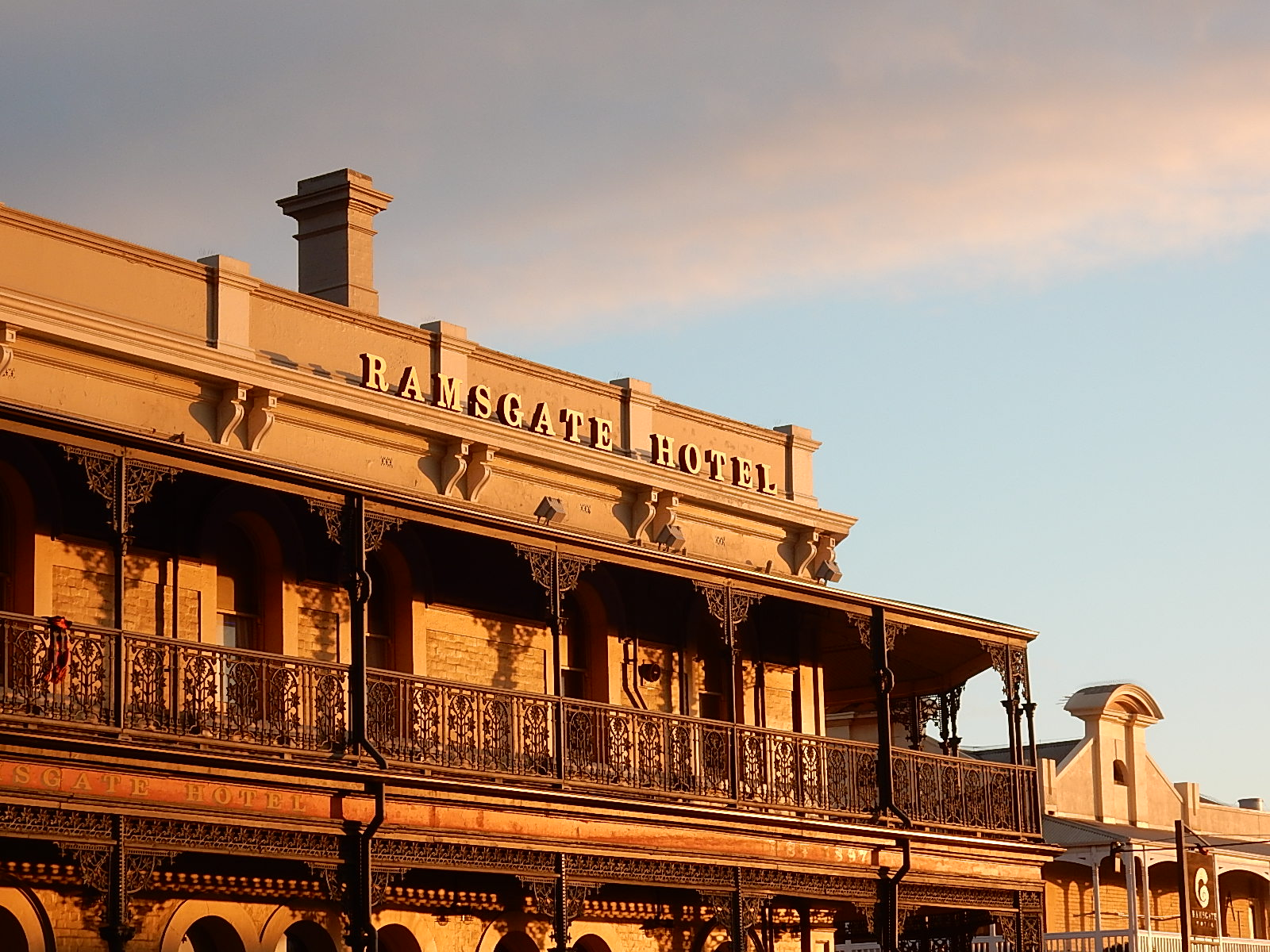
The Ramsgate

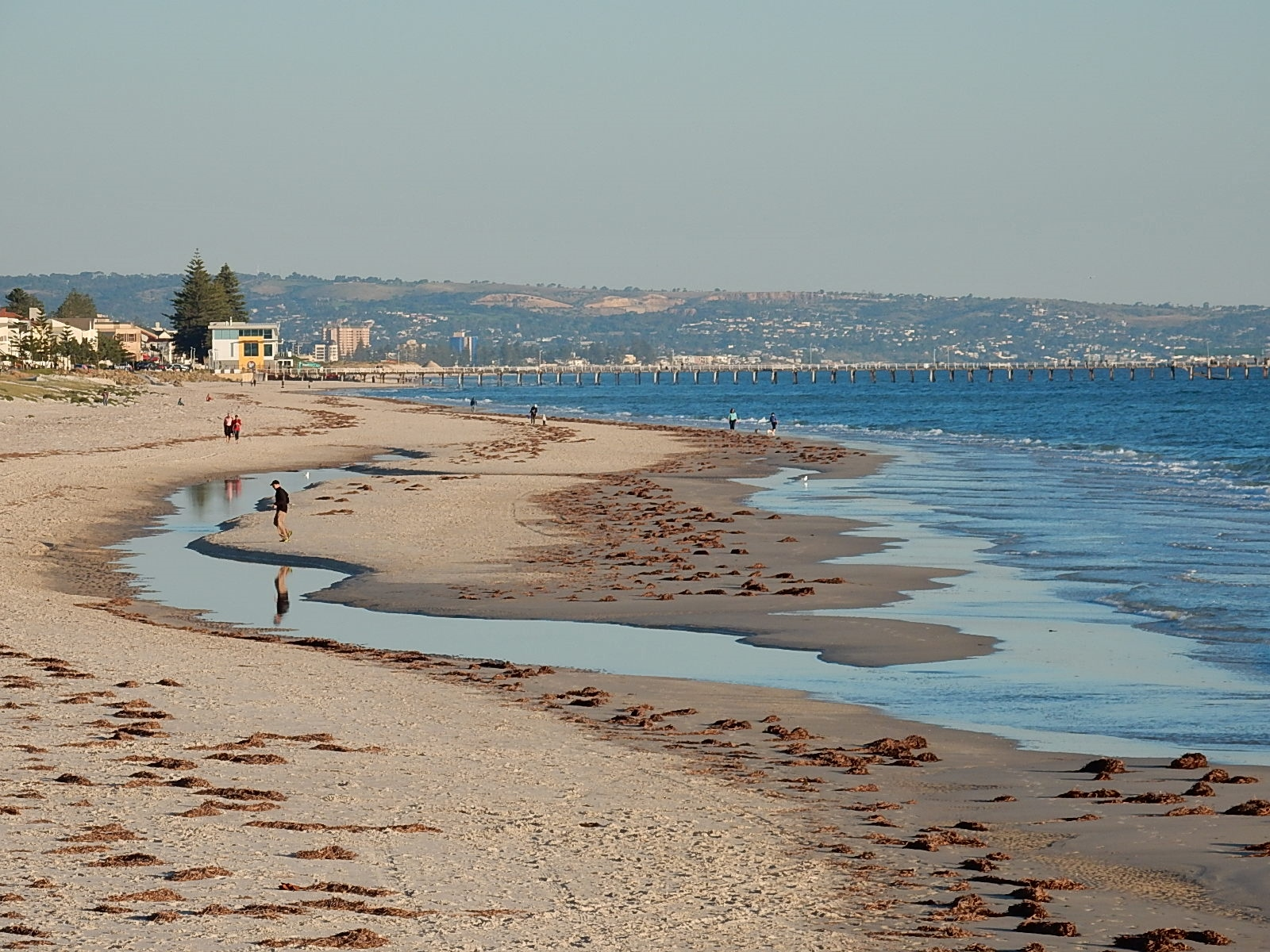
Henley Beach North

== See also ==
- List of Adelaide suburbs
