= Lockleys, South Australia =

Lockleys
- Suburb
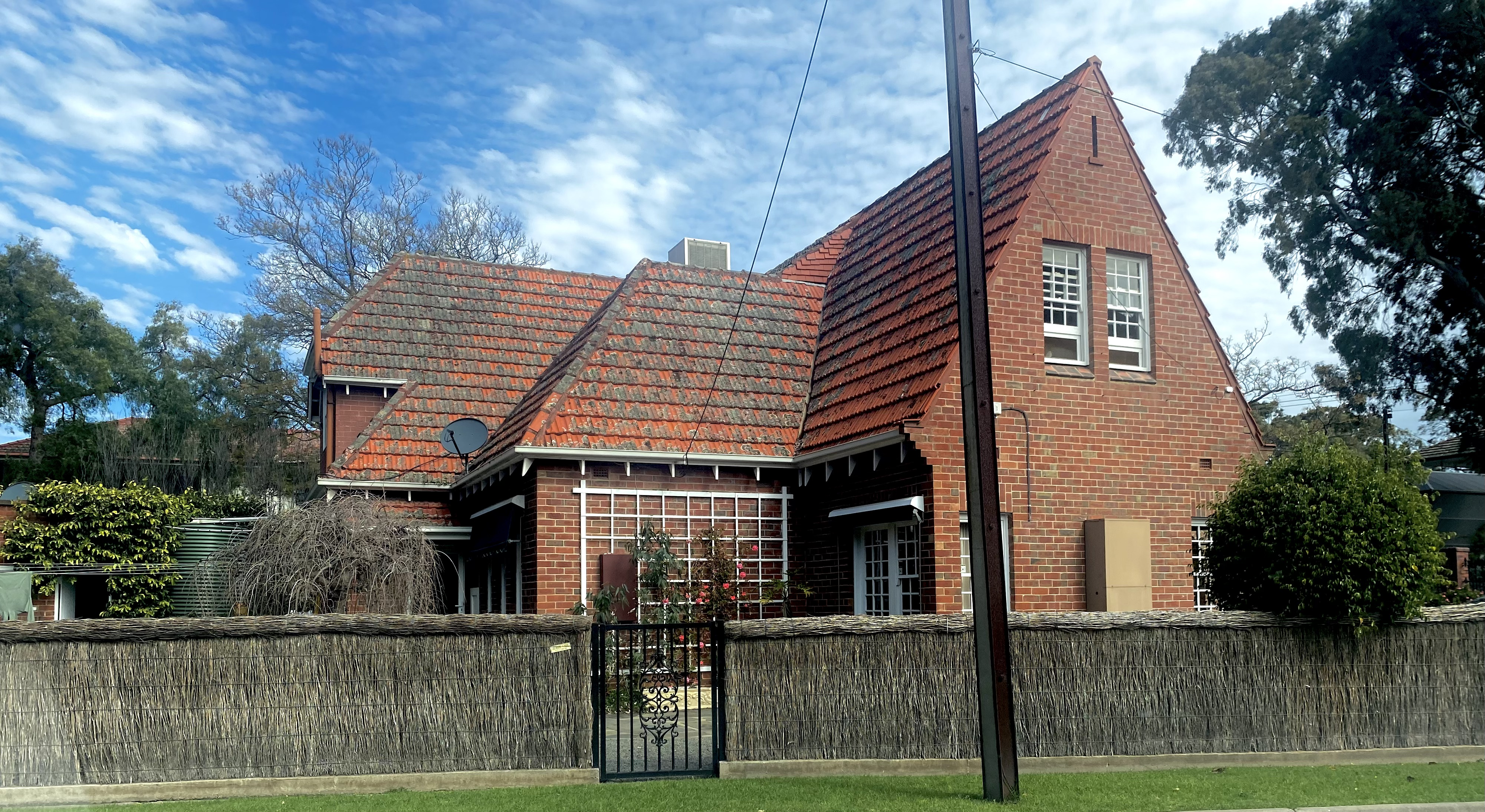
- Residential home in Lockleys

- Interactive map of Lockleys
- Coordinates: 34.925°S 138.531°E
- Country: Australia
- State: South Australia
- City: Adelaide
- LGA: City of West Torrens

Government
  - State electorate: West Torrens, Colton
  - Federal division: Hindmarsh

Population
  - Total: 5,987 (SAL 2021)
- Postcode: 5032
Suburbs around Lockleys
Fulham Gardens	Kidman Park	Flinders Park
Fulham	Lockleys	Underdale
West Beach	Adelaide Airport	Brooklyn Park

Lockleys is an inner western suburb of Adelaide, in the City of West Torrens, now largely a residential area.

== History ==
The area was subject to flooding by the River Torrens, which originally ran into an area named "The Reedbeds" in the upper reaches of the Port River. In the 1930s the Torrens Channel, also named Breakout Creek, was cut through the coastal dunes to Gulf St Vincent, to drain the wetlands and eliminate the flooding. A large part of Lockleys is within a bend of the River Torrens.

Hence, prior to subdivision, the area was renowned for its rich soil, market gardens and greenhouses. The name comes from a property (section 145) owned by Charles Brown Fisher, then Edward Meade Bagot and Gabriel Bennett, who built a course there for amateur horse racing. The property was rented by trainers J. Eden Savill and C. Leslie Macdonald for their Lockleys Stables, where many good racehorses were prepared.

=== Hank family ===
The area was divided for housing. However, the Hank family lived on Torrens Avenue, Lockleys, and had established 11 acres of market garden there after world war I. The Hank brothers (Ray, Bill and Bob) all attended the Lockleys Primary (now called the Brooklyn Park Primary) School in Brooklyn Park and would all become footballers for the West Torrens Football Club in the SANFL. Bob Hank would go on to become an AFL Hall of Fame inductee, winning the Magarey Medal in both 1946 and 1947 and winning a record 9 league best and fairest awards for his club. A pavilion in the eastern grandstand at Adelaide Oval is named the Bob Hank Pavilion and the grandstand at Thebarton Oval is named the Hank Brothers Stand after these Australian Football legends. Bob Hank also famously clean bowled Sir Donald Bradman in a District Cricket final in March 1947 whilst playing for the West Torrens Cricket Club against Bradman's Kensington Cricket Club.

=== John Martin's warehouse ===
The former John Martin's department store had a bulk warehouse on Pierson Street, which was also a storage location for the floats used in the company's annual Christmas Pageant. The warehouse was converted by EDS for a data and call centre, which opened in 1996, and later owned by the Maras Group and operated by Westpac as a mortgage processing centre. In September 2021 a development application was announced for rezoning the call centre and adjacent child care centre, to allow a medium density residential development to be built on the site.

=== Windsor Theatre ===
The Windsor Theatre, located at 362 Henley Beach Road, was originally built as a RSL hall in March 1925, with the construction cost of £3,800 covered by community fund-raising, with much of it donated by John Mellor. It was called the Lockleys Memorial Hall. On 10 October in the same year, the hall was used by Lyric Theatres Ltd to screen a film, and soon became a successful movie theatre. At some point it was named the Odeon Star (indicating ownership by D. Clifford Theatres).

The Windsor Group acquired the cinema in October 1948, renaming it as the Windsor Theatre, and by 1949 the lease had been acquired by Ozone Theatres Ltd. During the 1950s the cinema was substantially upgraded. The "Nostalgia Walk" was created, with hundreds of original movie posters lining the walls. It seated 500 people, and was the first cinema in Adelaide to sell popcorn.

The Windsor ceased operating in August 2012, and remained mostly vacant for a couple of years after that. In 2018, the theatre was purchased by the City of West Torrens., who demolished it in early 2021 despite public debate and much resistance from organisations which saw its heritage and cultural value to the area. During demolition, a hidden basement was rediscovered, containing a kitchen and supper room.

== Lockleys today ==
Lockleys now features many large modern homes including one shown on the Grand Designs television show.

Australian Bureau of Statistics data from May 2021 revealed that Adelaide's western suburbs had the lowest unemployment rate in South Australia.

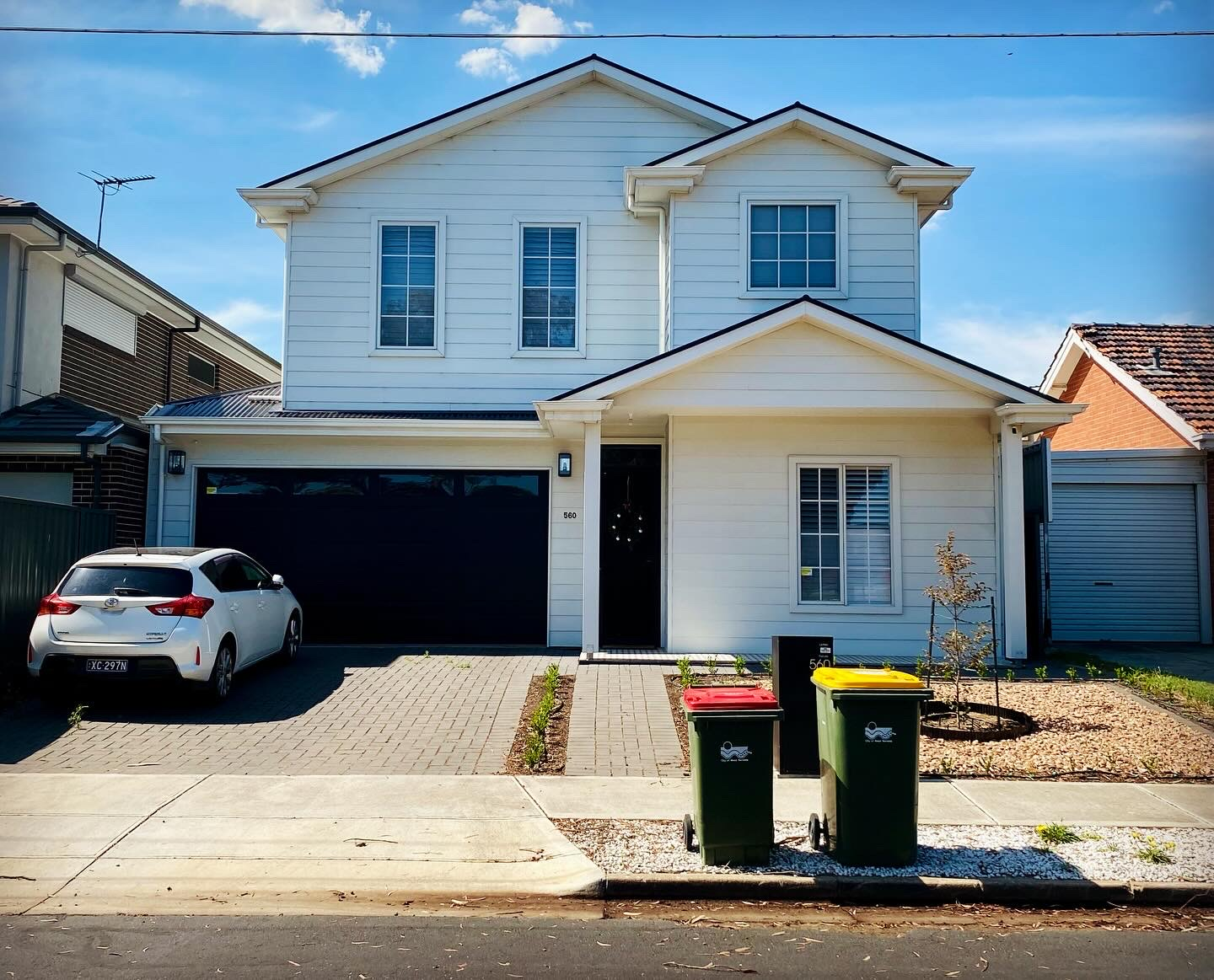
Weatherboard house in Lockleys

The Catholic Church in the suburb is dedicated to Christ the King.

== Sport ==
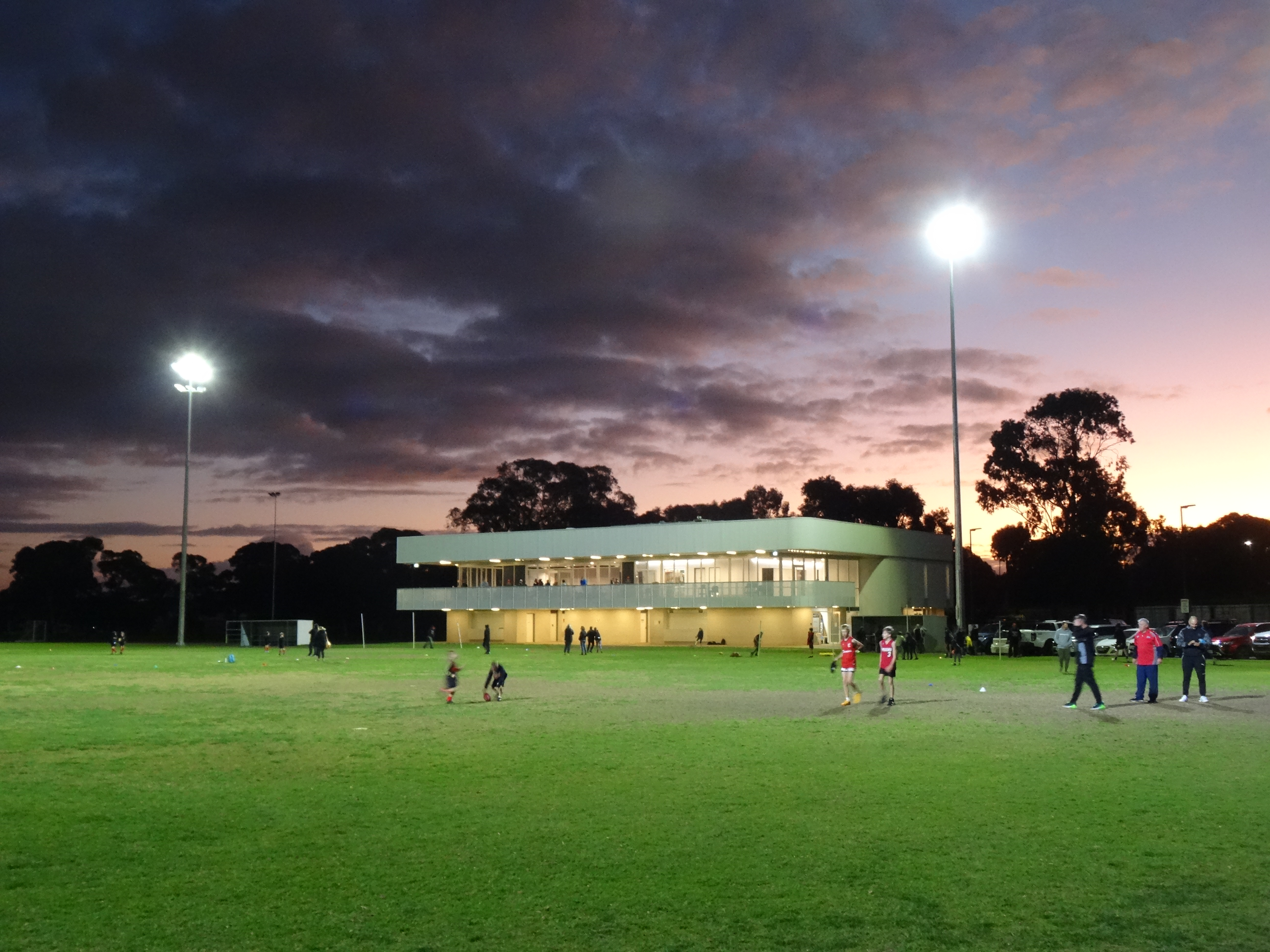
Lockleys Oval

Lockleys is home to the Lockleys Football Club, known as the Demons, their home clubrooms on Rutland Ave are a modern two-story facility that has won a state award for its architecture. The club play in the South Australian Amateur Football League. AFLW player Ebony Marinoff played for the club, as well as former AFL player Jimmy Toumpas and Brooklyn Park local and Port Power draftee Thomas Scully

The Lockleys Football Club facilities are shared with the West Torrens Baseball Club. The South Australian Badminton Association is also located in Lockleys, neighbouring the football club and baseball club. The Kooyonga Golf Club is also located in Lockleys. Kooyonga was the name of the suburb before it became Lockleys.

== Government ==
Lockleys is in the City of West Torrens local government area, split between the South Australian House of Assembly electoral district of Colton and electoral district of West Torrens, and in the Australian House of Representatives Division of Hindmarsh.

== Education ==
Lockleys North Primary School
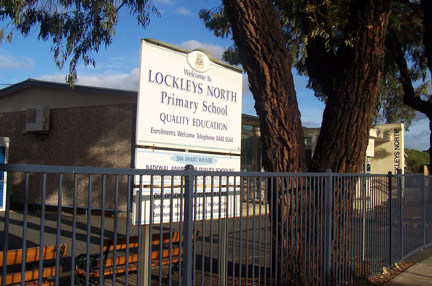

Location
- 55 Malurus Avenue; Lockleys, South Australia; Australia; 34.920°S 138.538°E

Information
- Type: Public
- Motto: Aim high
- Established: 1960
- Principal: Tyson Grinham
- Enrolment: 462 (2012)
- Colours: Blue; White
- Website: www.lnps.sa.edu.au

St Francis School

Location
- 458 Henley Beach Road; Lockleys, South Australia; Australia; 34.9243°S 138.5261°E

Information
- Type: Catholic school
- Motto: Faith, Peace, Wisdom
- Established: 1967
- Principal: Phil Schultz
- Enrolment: 438 (2021)
- Colours: Blue; Green; Gold
- Website: www.sflockleys.catholic.edu.au

Two schools are located in Lockleys, Lockleys North Primary School and St Francis School. Despite its name, Lockleys Primary School is located in neighbouring suburb Brooklyn Park.

=== Lockleys North Primary School ===
Lockleys North Primary School is a coeducational grades R-6 school located on Malurus Avenue. Students come from a wide variety of socio-economic and cultural backgrounds due to the demographics of West Torrens area.

==== History ====
With the expansion of the western suburbs of Adelaide the school was built in 1960. The school celebrated its 50th anniversary with an open day for old scholars and old staff on 14 November 2010.

==== Facilities ====
In July 2010, two new school buildings opened: "Tirkandi" (Library) and "Torrens" (classrooms for year 6-7's). The library was opened by Steve Georganas, the Member of Parliament for the seat of Hindmarsh. The school grounds also have a soccer pitch which have not only used by the school, but also local sporting clubs. The gymnasium has also been used for badminton by local sporting clubs.

==== Special programs ====
Specialist programs are offered in science, physical education, music, German and Greek.

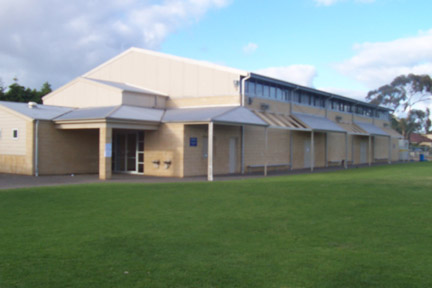
Auditorium

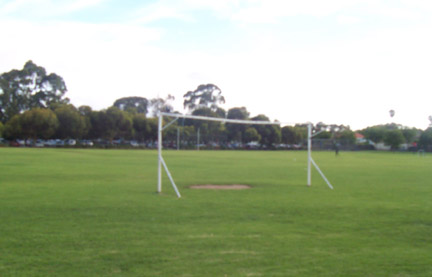
Sports fields

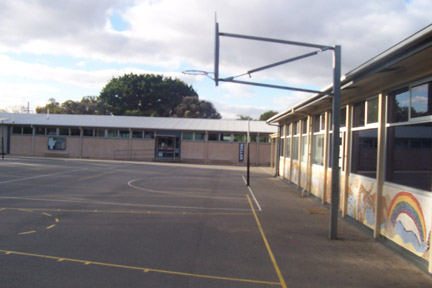
Quadrangle

=== St Francis School ===
St Francis School is a coeducational grades R-6 school located on Henley Beach Road. It is a private Catholic school.
