= Jervois Bridge =

Bridge connecting Port Adelaide to Ethelton over the Port River, South Australia

- Coordinates: 34°50′46″S 138°29′48″E
- Carries: St Vincent Street to Hart Street
- Crosses: Port River
- Locale: Lefevre Peninsula
- Named for: William Jervois
- Owner: Department of Planning, Transport & Infrastructure
- Preceded by: Birkenhead Bridge
- Followed by: Outer Harbor railway line bridge

Characteristics
- No. of lanes: 4

History
- Opened: 28 July 1969

The Jervois Bridge is a bridge in Greater Adelaide, Australia that crosses the Port River.

Construction of the original 98 m (322 ft) Jervois Bridge from Port Adelaide to Ethelton commenced in July 1875, using components manufactured in England by Westwood, Baillie. It was the first swing bridge in Australia, with mechanical equipment provided by William Armstrong & Co of Newcastle upon Tyne.

Built to carry pedestrian, rail and road traffic, it was officially opened on 7 February 1878 by the Governor of South Australia, William Jervois, after whom it was named.

By 1924, it had ceased to be used by rail traffic, after the line had been diverted. Operation of the swing bridge passed from the South Australian Railways to the Harbours Board in December 1924. In 1937, the control tower and its support gantry were elevated to allow use by double-decker AEC 661T trolleybuses.

The original bridge closed in August 1966 to make way for a new bridge. It was later demolished with the control tower and supporting gantry moved to Nile Street, where it remained as an entrance to the Fishermen's Wharf Market car park until 2016, when the carpark was partially redeveloped for a new office building. The control tower and supporting gantry were removed to the Council depot for restoration, with the intention of finally moving it to the Hart's Mill site, close to its original location. The remnants of the original bridge received a Historic Engineering Marker from Engineers Australia as part of its Engineering Heritage Recognition Program.

The new four-lane bridge was constructed on an alignment a short distance upstream, opening on 28 July 1969.

Upstream (south) of the Jervois Bridge lies the Jervois Basin Ships' Graveyard, and beyond that the railway bridge carrying the Outer Harbor railway line.
