= George Bollen =

Homeopathic doctor in South Australia

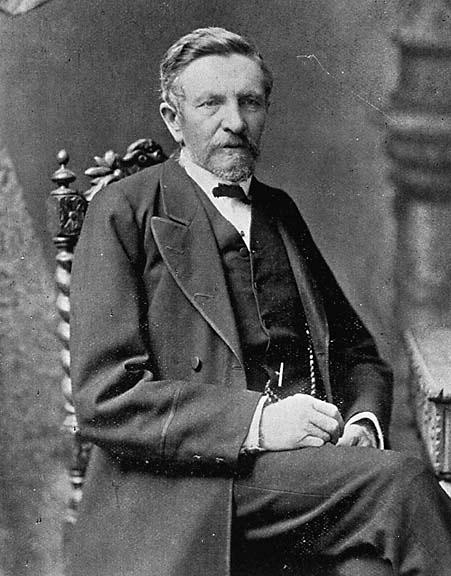
- Bollen, c. 1880

Mayor of Port Adelaide
- In office 1882–1883
- Preceded by: Henry W. Thompson

Personal details
- Born: April 12, 1826 Brighton, Sussex, England
- Died: September 22, 1892 (aged 66) Adelaide, South Australia
- Resting place: Cheltenham Cemetery(then known as Woodville Cemetery)
- Spouse: Rebecca Bollen(died 1892)
- Children: 9
- Education: Hahnemann Medical College, Chicago
- Occupation: Homeopath

George Bollen (12 April 1826 – 22 September 1892) was a homeopath in the colony of South Australia, a prominent citizen of Mount Barker and Port Adelaide, philanthropist and teetotaller.

== History ==
Bollen was born in Brighton, Sussex, and emigrated to South Australia in 1854, arriving aboard the ship Albermarle in November, and in 1855 settled at Mount Barker, working as a cooper. He later practiced homeopathic medicine, there being at that time no restriction on who might call himself "doctor" or treat patients.

He left for America in 1872, in order to gain medical qualifications from Hahnemann College of Chicago, in which he was successful, gaining the degree of Bachelor of Medicine. He returned to South Australia by the SS Alexandra in June 1873, settling at Port Adelaide, and opened a clinic on St Vincent Street, which developed a considerable patronage.

In 1880 the Medical Board of South Australia refused his application for registration as a practitioner under the Medical Act of 1880, despite his (homeopathic) qualifications being acceptable in the United States. The Register was solidly behind the Board, citing a mistaken diagnosis by Bollen as proof of his unfitness to practise.

The case referred to was of a sailor named Johnson, who was diagnosed by Bollen as suffering from Asiatic cholera, a dangerous and highly contagious disease, yet he did not report it or quarantine the patient. Drs Allan Campbell and Joseph Verco determined it was a case of "English cholera", a much less troublesome infection. There was no criticism of his treatment, and the patient recovered, but the case became a weapon against dubiously qualified practitioners.

He had, however, a champion in William Mattinson, MP for Port Adelaide, who in November 1882 introduced a bill into the House of Assembly, overriding the Board's decree. This was not the end of the matter however, it was not until the full bench of the Supreme Court of South Australia in 1889 issued a writ of mandamus instructing the Board to accept his application, that the matter was resolved.

== Public affairs ==
Bollen was closely involved in civic affairs at the Port. He was a councillor with the Corporate Town of Port Adelaide for several years, and was elected mayor in 1883. During his period as mayor, the Robinson Bridge was opened by the Governor, Sir William Robinson, and Bollen hosted a banquet — perhaps unique in the history of South Australia — on temperance principles, he being a total abstainer.

Bollen was actively interested in politics, and had much to say on the subject. He proposed

- Ministers should be elected by Parliament without being proposed or seconded, and without discussion; should any member get an absolute majority of votes he would be elected; otherwise the first two or three candidates should run again, so that every minister would be selected by an absolute majority of the Parliament. If such a method were adopted, Parliament would become a deliberating assembly, rather than "an arena of struggling office-seekers". He also proposed increasing the number of ministers to twelve, one of the new positions to be Minister of Health.
- That in the event of a deadlock, when a measure had been twice passed by one Chamber, and twice rejected by the other, a joint sitting should be called to either pass or reject it.

Bollen was twice a candidate for a House of Assembly seat: West Torrens in 1884, and Port Adelaide in 1890; but though a "warm favourite" in the latter, was not successful, ranking fifth of eleven candidates perhaps because he had no organising committee. He also contested the Central District seat on the Legislative Council at the 1890 elections, again unsuccessfully.

== Personal ==
Bollen was well known as a preacher in the Wesleyan Methodist tradition, not only on the Port Adelaide circuit, but also at the Dunn Memorial Church in Mount Barker, where he had a summer residence. He built an infirmary in the area, noted for having no chimney. On its completion Bollen decided to permanently live at the Mount, building a distinctive "wedding-cake" house for his large family which survives.

Another instance of Bollen's philanthropy was his role, with E. Hounslow, in the 1879 formation of the Port Adelaide Seamen's Mission, of which he was elected president, a position he held until his death. He contributed £500 towards a Sailors' Rest at the Port. He was president of the Port Branch of the British and Foreign Bible Society for several years.

== Last day ==
Bollen and some friends were on a train bound for Mount Barker when he discovered the ticket-collector had taken the wrong half of their return tickets. He left the train to sort the matter out, but the train left the platform without him. He collapsed and died, perhaps while trying to hail a coach that would help him rejoin the others.

The funeral took place at the Woodville Cemetery.

== Family ==
Bollen married Rebecca ( – 1892). They had nine children, of whom three sons gained medical degrees:

- Jane Evangeline Bollen (1854–1931) married Joseph Butterworth (1851–1910) on 16 August 1877.
- Laura Eliza Bollen (1856– )
- William Henry Bollen (1858–1920)
- Dr Frederick James Bollen MB (1860– )
- Mary Elizabeth Bollen (1862–1862)
- John Bollen (1863–1864)
- Ernstine Bollen (1864– )
- Dr Christopher Bollen MB (29 July 1866 – 12 September 1952) took his MB at Toronto, was an Army doctor, rank of major.
- Dr Percival Bollen MB (1869–1922) had a practice in St Vincent Street, Port Adelaide.
