= Cheltenham Cemetery (South Australia) =

Cemetery in Australia

Cheltenham Cemetery and Cheltenham Mausoleum
- Interactive map of Cheltenham Cemetery and Cheltenham Mausoleum

Details
- Established: 1876 (cemetery); 2020 (mausoleum)
- Location: High St & Port Road, Cheltenham, South Australia
- Country: Australia
- Coordinates: 34.872°S 138.526°E
- Owned by: Adelaide Cemeteries Authority
- No. of interments: >74,000
- Website: Official website
- Find a Grave: Cheltenham Cemetery and Cheltenham Mausoleum
- Footnotes: Cheltenham Mausoleum – Find a Grave; Cheltenham Cemetery – Billion Graves; Cheltenham Cemetery – CWGC

Cheltenham Cemetery (including the adjoining Cheltenham Mausoleum) is a cemetery in the suburb of Cheltenham, within Adelaide, South Australia.

== History ==
Originally the Port Adelaide and Suburban Cemetery, Cheltenham – but known as Woodville Cemetery – the burial ground was established in 1876 by the Port Adelaide Corporation. Funds were allocated for the cemetery by the South Australian colonial administration in 1874. The first recorded burial was Mrs. Hannah Mussared on 27 Jul 1876.

An Islamic cemetery is located in the Cheltenham precinct's near vicinity.

== Sporting folklore ==
For decades, the cemetery featured in a piece of Port Adelaide Football Club folklore known as the "Cheltenham Cemetery curse". Opposition teams were said to be doomed as soon as they passed it on the way to Port Adelaide's home ground, Alberton Oval.

== Notable interments and cremations ==
also: Category:Burials at Cheltenham Cemetery

=== Cheltenham Cemetery ===
- Dr George Bollen
- David Bower (politician)
- John Carr (Australian politician, born 1871)
- James Luke (Jim) Cavanagh (1913–1990)
- Sarah Francisco
- John Barton Hack
- Ruby Florence Hammond (1936–1993)
- Charles Harrison (Australian politician)
- Joseph Coles Kirby
- F. N. Le Messurier (1891–1966)
- Ivor MacGillivray
- Léon Edmond Mazure (1860–1939)
- Adelaide Miethke
- Victor Herbert Ryan (1874–1956)
- Frederick Furner Ward (1872–1954)
- Thomas Parking (Tom) Willason (1882–1939)
- Norah Magdalene Wilson (1901–1971)
- The Hon. Sir Eric Neal AC CVO KStJ
  (1924–2025)
