= Sarah Francisco =

Australian criminal (1839–1916)

- Born: circa 1839; Ireland
- Died: 2 November 1916 (aged 77); Adelaide, South Australia
- Known for: Local identity in Adelaide, South Australia known for her alcohol-related arrests

Sarah Francisco (c. 1839 – 2 November 1916) was a resident of Adelaide, South Australia. Notorious for her frequent alcohol-related arrests she still holds the record for number of arrests in South Australia and was to spend more than 16 years in gaol despite the majority of her sentences running concurrently and receiving no sentence longer than 12 months.

== Early life ==
Sarah Francisco was born Sarah Whelan in Ireland around 1839. Her mother died in 1844 and Francisco was brought up by an aunt on a dairy farm. In 1865 her elder sister emigrated to Australia and Francisco followed later, arriving in Adelaide on 7 November 1866. In 1867 she married John "Frank" Francisco, a Genoese sailor and settled down in Port Adelaide.

Her husband was a heavy drinker and violent. Francisco carried a facial scar from being hit in the face with a brass candlestick and while under the influence Frank attempted to murder her on several occasions, once by throwing her down a well and several times by giving her poison. One day, complaining of a sore ankle, he took to his bed and refused to leave it for more than three years. After his doctor suggested he needed to take a two-week break away from home he left and never returned.

The marriage had produced two sons, Joseph and John. As sole breadwinner Francisco worked several cleaning jobs from 3am to 11pm, working with one child on her back while cradling the youngest. Following five-year-old John's death in an accident, Francisco took to drinking and eventually became an alcoholic.

== Notoriety ==
Arrested for the first time on 30 July 1873, then 34-year-old Francisco went on to amass a total of 295 convictions for drunkenness, indecent language, assault, resisting arrest, riotous behaviour, abusive language and disturbing the peace. Regarded by the courts as "an incorrigible rogue" Francisco's strength was legendary, often taking several constables considerable effort to arrest her. The majority of her sentences (180 years in total) were served concurrently, although still resulting in her spending more than 16 years in Adelaide Gaol. Francisco had her "own cell" in No 2 Yard where the occupant would be immediately evicted whenever she was brought in. Her arrests were reported by the local newspapers in detail and eventually the number of convictions became newsworthy in New Zealand which occasionally reported on further convictions.

SARAH FRANCISCO AGAIN
There are few persons who have a more unenviable police record than Sarah Francisco [aged 63], who appeared at the Port Adelaide Police Court on Tuesday morning, before Messrs. C. R. Morris and B. Fisher. In November of last year Sarah was sentenced to imprisonment for 12 months, and was released only about a week ago. Although she had gone without intoxicating liquor for a year she had apparently not forgotten the taste of it, as on Monday morning she started her pranks again. She walked along the streets of Port Adelaide shouting, yelling, and brandishing a stick. Sarah was cautioned by the police several times to remain quiet, but she took no notice of the warning. Eventually Sarah was arrested, but she threw herself on the ground and used her stick threateningly! Sarah has a reputation of being "as strong as a lion" and there seems to be some justification for the comparison, as three policemen could not remove her to the police station. A trolly was obtained and the woman taken to the station on it. — The Advertiser, 18 November 1903

In the early 1910s Francisco, who was then in her 70s, decided to reform and pleaded guilty for the very first time. Accepting a place in the Salvation Army Home instead of 3 months in gaol she became a strong supporter of the Salvation Army. She never offended again.

In 1996 the Historical Society of South Australia gave a lecture on Francisco's life entitled "Saucy Sarah, Rarely Sober".

== Death ==
Francisco died on 2 November 1916 at the age of 77. Seven years earlier, she had been offered a free burial from a local undertaker and she was buried in the Cheltenham Cemetery. Many people attended the burial and the Salvation Army band played in her memory.
