= Port Adelaide Workers Memorial =

Memorial statue by John Tillett, in Port Adelaide

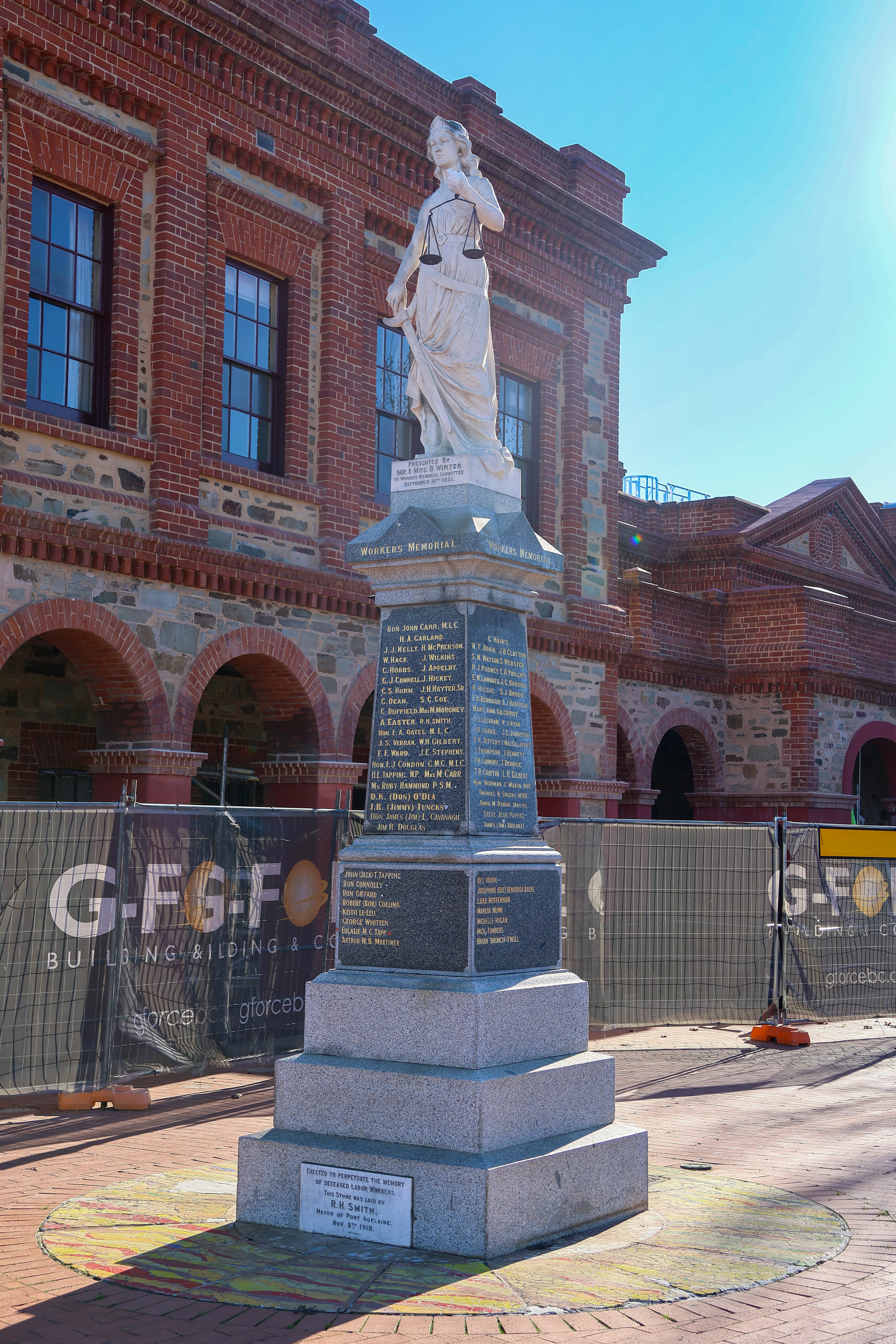
- The memorial in 2026
- Artist: Mr John Tillett
- Year: Begun 1918; completed 1921
- Type: Statue
- Medium: Granite and marble
- Location: Corner of Commercial Rd and St Vincent St, Port Adelaide, South Australia
- Owner: City of Port Adelaide Enfield

The Port Adelaide Workers Memorial is a public memorial sculpture located in Port Adelaide, South Australia which recognises people who have made a significant contribution to promoting workers' rights in the Port Adelaide community.

The memorial bears the names of many prominent figures in the South Australian trade union movement and Labor Party, as well as workers who served in the Great War of 1914 -1918.

== History ==
After the death in 1916 of Hugh Garland, a prominent Port Adelaide trade unionist and founder of the Daily Herald, a committee was formed by the local branch of the Australian Labor Party and representatives of the United Trades and Labour Council to organise for the creation of a memorial to honour the contribution of labour activists in the Port.

The Port Adelaide city council granted permission for the statue to be erected in 1917, and funding for the project was raised through donations from a carnival and a social held by the Ladies Committee of the Labor Party. Part of the fundraising was carried out by the Port Adelaide Football Club which fielded a Women's side in 1918 to play on Alberton Oval against a team representing Thebarton.

Affiliated unions of the Trades and Labour Council each nominated past members for the 41 names included in the initial inscription. Of these, 8 had recently been killed during World War I.

The granite base of the memorial was officially unveiled on 6 December 1918. At the ceremony, John Gunn MP, the leader of the State Labor Party, declared that the men whose names appeared on the memorial had "done great things for the trade union movement - when it was not respectable as it is today, when it was almost a crime to be a unionist, when men had to hold union meetings secretly, and when to be known as a unionist meant victimisation".

The marble statue of Justice was installed in 1921 after being commissioned in Italy and donated by Mr. and Mrs. Winter, local merchants.

== Modern use ==
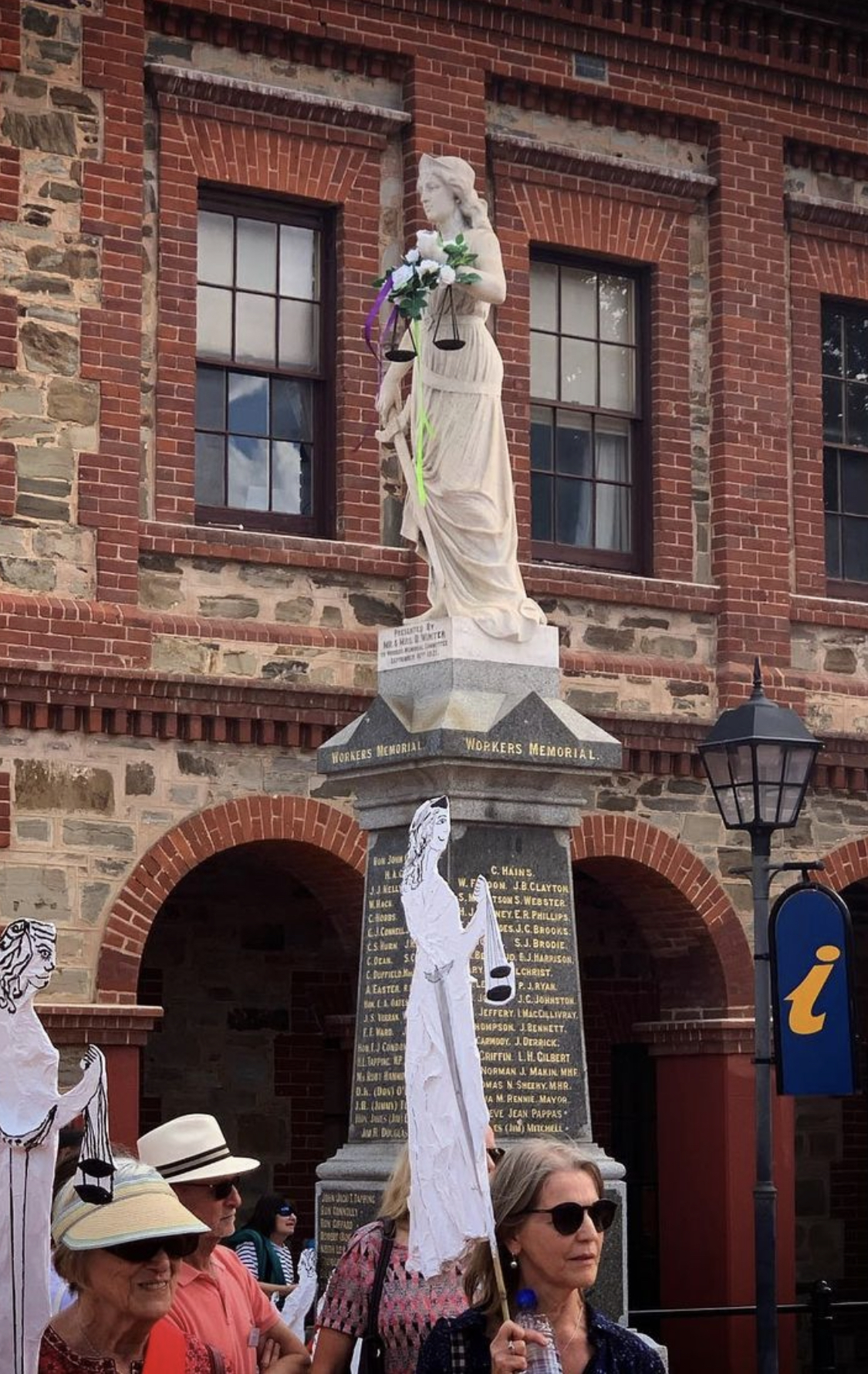
Port Adelaide Workers Memorial During South Australian May Day celebrations in 2021.

The memorial is currently owned by the City of Port Adelaide Enfield and managed by a committee made up of the Mayor and representatives of SA Unions and the Port Adelaide Federal Electoral Council of the Australian Labor Party.

Each year the Committee nominates a single name to be inscribed on the monument, which is traditionally done during a ceremony on International Workers Memorial Day or as part of May Day celebrations.
