= Fishermen's Wharf Market =

Building in Australia

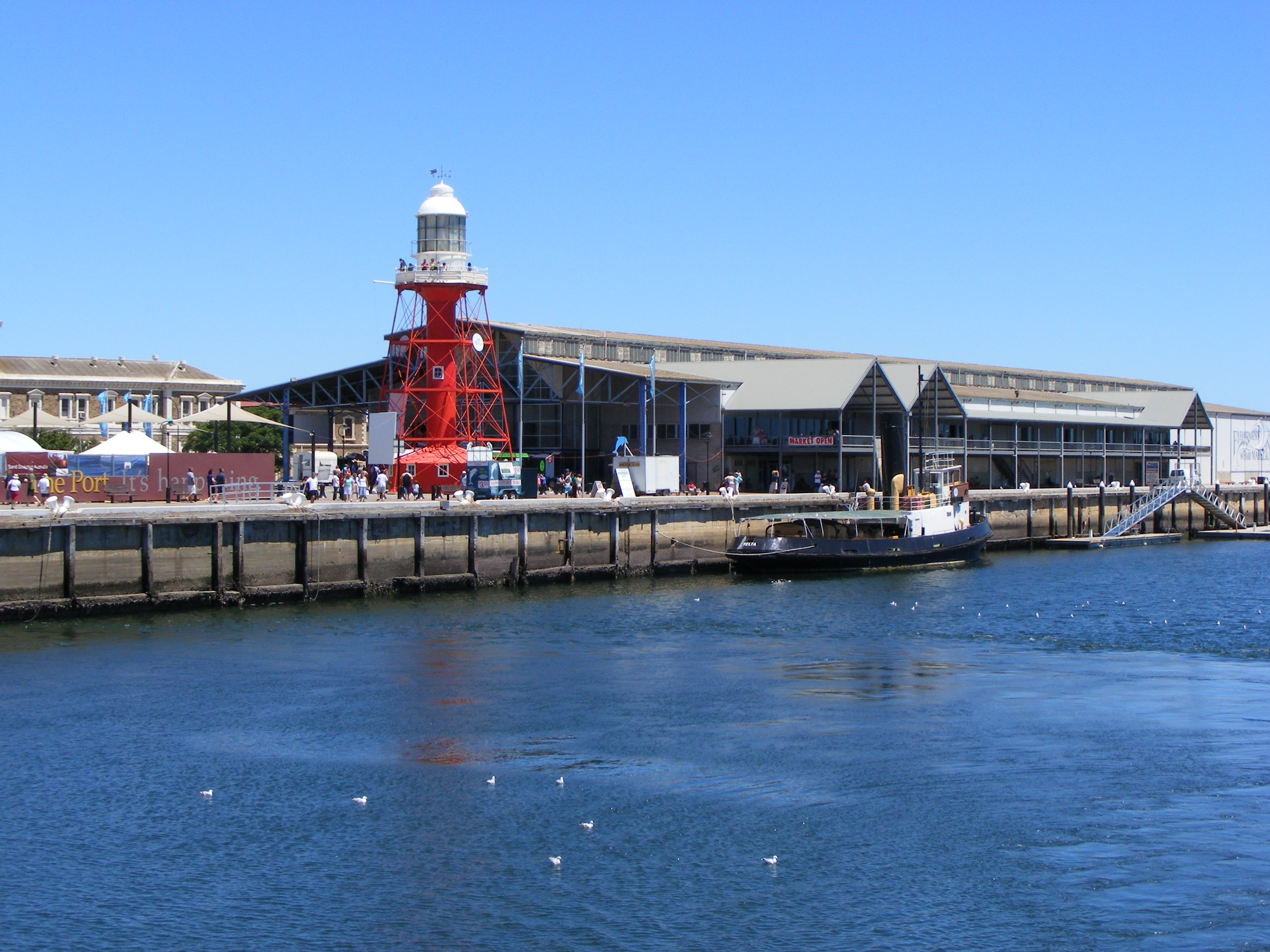
- Interactive map of the Fishermen's Wharf Market area

General information
- Location: Black Diamond Square, Commercial Road, Port Adelaide, Adelaide, Australia
- Coordinates: 34.842921°S 138.503340°E

Website
- fishermenswharfmarkets.com

Fishermen's Wharf Market, also known as Wharf Shed 1, was a large enclosed building that used to host Sunday markets in Port Adelaide. It was located in the Inner Harbor of Port Adelaide adjacent to the Birkenhead Bridge.

== History ==
McLaren Wharf being redeveloped in 1930's with the large wharf sheds being built. Fishermen's Wharf Market was the last remaining wharf shed in Port Adelaide's inner harbour.

In the 1930s McLaren Wharf was redeveloped to accommodate the increase in volume of shipping coming through Port Adelaide.

== Market Closure ==
It was open on Sundays from 9 am to 4 pm. Monday and Public Holidays from 9 am to 4 pm.

The Markets were permanently closed in August/September 2022.
