= SA Unions =

Trade union federation in South Australia

Coordinates: 34.926066°S 138.590092°E

- Predecessor: South Australian Labor League
- Formation: 1884; 142 years ago
- Type: Peak trade union body
- Headquarters: 254 Waymouth Street
- Location: Adelaide, South Australia
- Region served: South Australia
- President: Jennie-Marie Gorman
- Secretary: Dale Beasley
- Parent organization: Australian Council of Trade Unions
- Affiliations: Affiliated organisations
- Website: saunions.org.au
- Formerly called: United Trades and Labor Council of South Australia

SA Unions (originally the United Trades and Labour Council of South Australia) is the peak body for trade unions in South Australia. It coordinates political, social, economic, and industrial campaigns between its affiliate members and implements the policies of the Australian Council of Trade Unions in South Australia.

== Campaigns ==
As well as implementing policy within South Australia, SA Unions aims to maximise the union movement's effect in political, social, economic and industrial issues; defend and extend the rights of working people and all disadvantaged members of the community; increase the support and relevance of unions; and provide leadership and co-ordination in issues of broad concern to unions and the community.

During the 2014 state election, SA Unions ran a targeted campaign of over 190,000 robocalls against Nick Xenophon and his ticket, the Nick Xenophon Team, in response to their policy of reducing penalty rates for weekend workers.

== Services ==
SA Unions operates two in-house legal services. The Workers Compensation Service provides free advocacy and dispute resolution to workers undergoing a workers compensation claim.

The Young Workers Legal Service provides free legal assistance to non-unionised workers under the age of 30 who are experiencing an industrial law dispute. The service is staffed by law student volunteers, and has recovered over $1 million in unpaid entitlements since it was created in 2003.

== Affiliated organisations ==
SA Unions is affiliated with 27 unions within South Australia, including the Australian Education Union (AEU), Australian Manufacturing Workers Union (AMWU), Australian Services Union (ASU), Australian Workers' Union (AWU), Communications, Electrical, and Plumbing Union (CEPU), Community and Public Sector Union (CPSU), Construction, Forestry, Mining, and Energy Union (CFMEU), Maritime Union of Australia (MUA), United Firefighters Union (UFU), Shop, Distributive and Allied Employees Association (SDA) and United Voice (UV).

== History ==
A United Trades and Labor Council meeting with the purpose of creating an elections committee was convened on 12 December 1890, and held on 7 January 1891. The elections committee was formed, marking the inception of what is today known as the South Australian Labor Party. Originally known as the United Labor Party of South Australia, the party enjoyed immediate success, electing parliamentarians just four months later, and immediately held the balance of power with 10 of 54 seats resulting from the 1893 election, allowing radical liberal Charles Kingston to defeat the conservative John Downer government. Kingston served as Premier of South Australia for a then-record of six and a half years, usually implementing legislation with Labor support. Thomas Price formed the state's first Labor minority government and the world's first stable Labor Party government at the 1905 election with the support of several non-Labor MPs to form the Price-Peake administration, which was re-elected at the 1906 double dissolution election, with Labor falling just two seats short of a majority. So successful, John Verran led Labor to form the state's first of many majority governments at the 1910 election, just two weeks after the 1910 federal election where their federal counterparts formed Australia's first elected majority in either house in the Parliament of Australia, the world's first Labor Party majority government at a national level, and after the 1904 Chris Watson minority government the world's second Labor Party government at a national level. The Australian Labor Party at both a federal and state/colony level pre-dates, among others, both the British Labour Party and the New Zealand Labour Party in party formation, government, and policy implementation. In less than two decades the party in South Australia went from inception to majority government, and would continue to this day as one of the two major parties in the bicameral Parliament of South Australia, the other being the Liberal Party of Australia (South Australian Division) created in 1974, and its predecessors.

The United Trades and Labour Council was central to fundraising and building support for the creation of the Port Adelaide Workers Memorial. SA Unions continues to have representatives on the committee managing the memorial.

== See also ==
- John McPherson
- Australian Labor Party (South Australian Branch)
- Australian labour movement
- Trades Hall
- Adelaide Trades Hall
- Victorian Trades Hall Council
- Trade union
