= Members of the South Australian Legislative Council, 1891–1894 =

This is a list of members of the South Australian Legislative Council from 1891 to 1894.

This was the third Legislative Council to be affected by the amendments to the Constitution, which provided for the Colony to be divided into four districts: (1) Central; (2) Southern; (3) North-Eastern and (4) Northern, with six members in each division; one third of each to be replaced in rotation every three years. (Previously, the whole colony acted as one electoral district "The Province" with one third replaced at General Elections every four years.)

| Name | District | Party | Time in office | Notes |
|---|---|---|---|---|
| Arthur Richman Addison | Northern | | 1888–1915 | |
| John Howard Angas | Central | | 1887–1894 | |
| Henry Ayers | North-Eastern | | 1857–1888; 1888–1893 | |
| Richard Chaffey Baker | Southern | | 1877–1901 | |
| John Bosworth | North-Eastern | | 1886–1894 | |
| Allan Campbell | Northern | | 1878–1898 | |
| David Morley Charleston | Central | Labor | 1891–Aug. 1897 | |
| William Copley | Northern | | 1887–1894 | |
| George Witherage Cotton | Central | | 1882–1886; 1888–1892 | Died, vacancy declared 16 December 1892 |
| John Darling Sr. | Northern | | 1888–1897 | |
| John Duncan | North-Eastern | NDL | 1891–1896; 1900–1913 | |
| John Hannah Gordon | Southern | | 1888–1892; 1893-1903 | Resigned 1892 elected April 1893 |
| Robert Storrie Guthrie | Central | Labor | 1891–1902; 1902–1903 | |
| William Haslam | North-Eastern | | 1891–1897 | |
| Andrew Alexander Kirkpatrick | Southern | Labor | 1891–1897; 1900–1909; 1918–1928 | |
| Friedrich Krichauff | Southern | | 1890–1894 | |
| Sylvanus James Magarey | Central | | 1888–1897 | |
| James Martin | North-Eastern | | 1885–1894 | |
| James O'Loghlin | Northern | | 1888–1902 | |
| William Alfred Robinson | Central | Labor | 1893–1900 | elected April 1893 |
| Alfred Muller Simpson | Central | | 1887–1894 | |
| John Lancelot Stirling | Southern | | 1891–1932 | elected July 1891 |
| Samuel Tomkinson | Southern | | 1885–1894; 1897–1900 | |
| Ebenezer Ward | Northern | | 1891–1900 | |
| John Warren | North-Eastern / Midland | | 1888–1912 | |
