= Birkenhead Bridge =

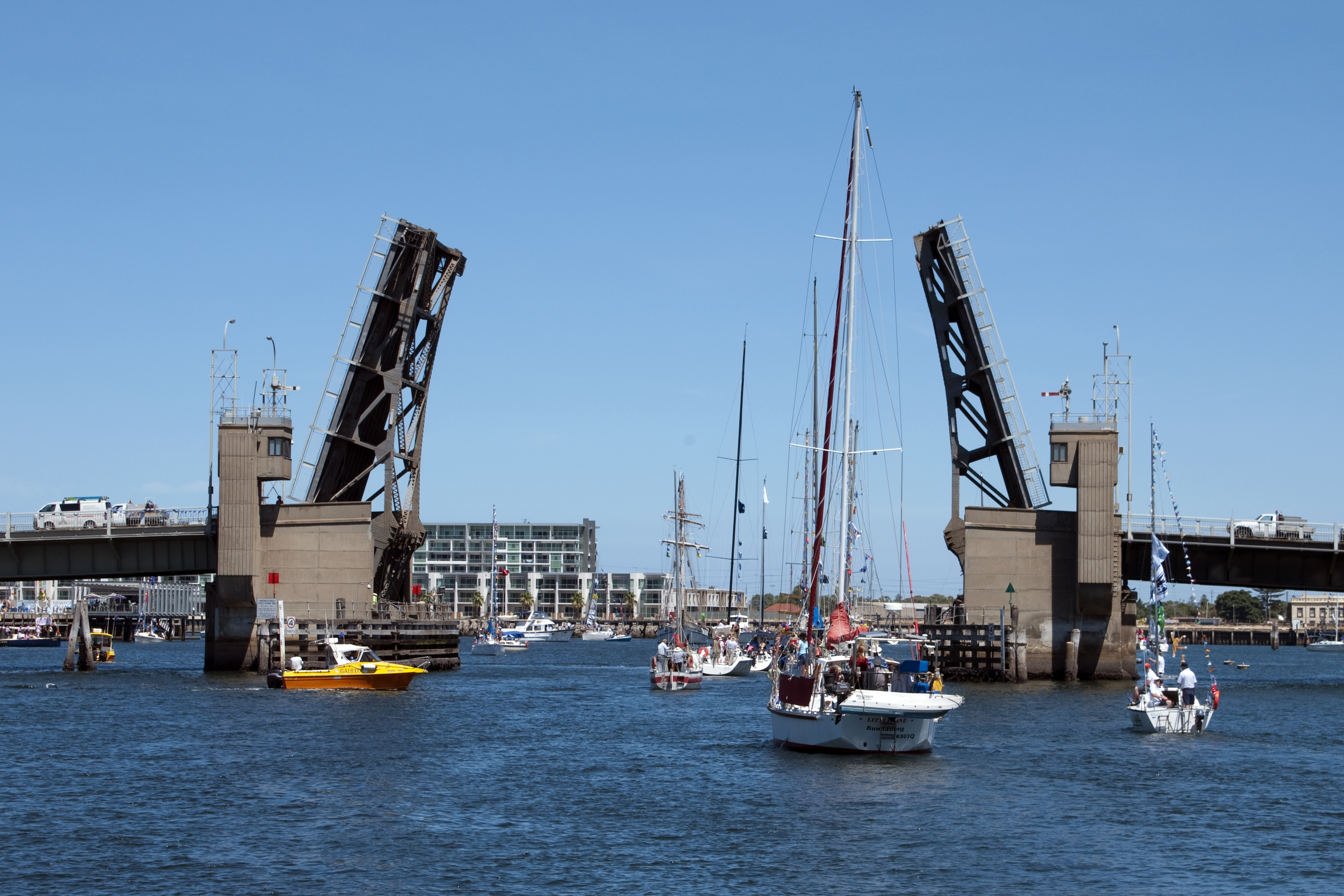
- Birkenhead Bridge in February 2010
- Coordinates: 34.84230°S 138.50093°E
- Carries: Nelson Street
- Crosses: Port River
- Locale: Lefevre Peninsula
- Owner: Department for Infrastructure & Transport
- Preceded by: Tom 'Diver' Derrick Bridge
- Followed by: Jervois Bridge

Characteristics
- Design: Bascule
- Total length: 246 metres
- Width: 16 metres
- Clearance above: 5.4 metres
- No. of lanes: 4 (as built); 2 (since 2014)

History
- Constructed by: Adelaide Construction
- Fabrication by: Perry Engineering
- Opened: 14 December 1940

Location
- Interactive map of Birkenhead Bridge

The Birkenhead Bridge is a bascule bridge in Adelaide, Australia that crosses the Port River.

In February 1938, the Government of South Australia awarded a contract to Adelaide Construction to build a bridge across the Port River from Birkenhead to Port Adelaide, with Perry Engineering contracted to supply the steelwork. The bridge was opened on 14 December 1940 by Governor Malcolm Barclay-Harvey. It was one of only four bascule bridges in the world adapted for use by trolleybuses.

In 2014, two of the four road lanes were converted into pedestrian and bike paths. In 2020, the timber road deck was replaced with fibre reinforced polymer and the timber footpath with aluminium.

The bridge is listed on the South Australian Heritage Register.
