= Hart's Mill =

Former flour mill complex in South Australia, Australia

Coordinates: 34°50′40″S 138°29′55″E

- Adelaide Milling and Mercantile Company Mill
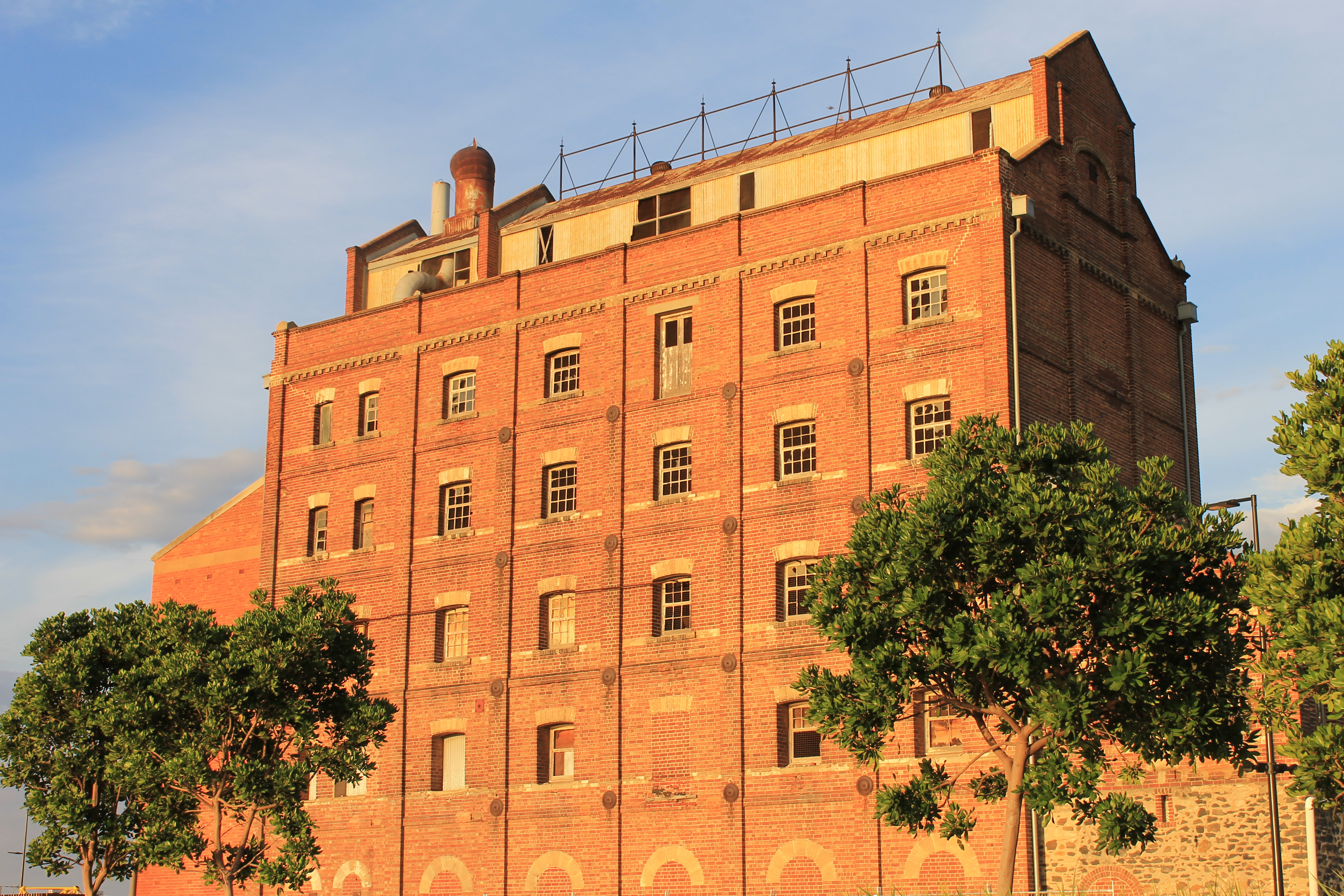
- The Adelaide Milling Company building, part of the Hart's Mill complex, at sunset in 2015.
- Interactive map of the Hart's Mill area

General information
- Location: Port Adelaide, Australia

Height
- Height: 14.6 m (48 ft)

Technical details
- Floor count: 5

Hart's Mill is a former flour mill complex located on a bend in the Port River, in the north-western corner of Port Adelaide, South Australia. The building, which is state heritage-listed, has been refurbished and is used as a cultural hub.

== Background ==
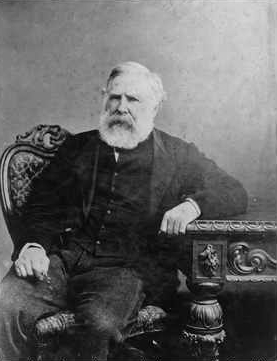
John Hart, the namesake of Hart's Mill

After his final voyage to England in 1846, John Hart settled near Port Adelaide in the colony of South Australia. He joined with H. Kent Hughes as merchants Hughes and Hart then, as Hart & Company, established large and successful flour mills. The flour mill at Port Adelaide, now colloquially referred to as Hart's Mill, was regarded as one of the best, and "Hart's Flour" commanded the highest prices in Australia.

John Hart & Co. merged with the Adelaide Milling Co. in 1882.

== Heritage listing ==
Hart's Mill has been listed as a state heritage place on the South Australian Heritage Register since 27 May 2004. Its significance is described as follows:

Built c. 1889, this substantial mill building is associated with the development of the wheat industry in South Australia in the latter part of the 19th century and specifically with the export of flour from the state through Port Adelaide. It is a rare example of a purpose-built late 19th century flour mill in South Australia, and when considered with the adjacent 1855 Hart's Mill, provides the only known example of two generations of flour mill buildings surviving on one site. The Packing Shed is an uncommon surviving example of an ancillary milling industry building. (HB Assessment Report 12/03)

== Restoration and uses ==
Now partially restored, it has become the suburb's cultural hub.

Renewal SA has been responsible for developing the Hart's Mill precinct, which included converting the Flour Shed into a venue for community events, landscaping the outdoor areas, and providing public amenities and a playground. The project won the UNESCO New Design in Heritage Concepts Award at the 2018 UNESCO Asia-Pacific Awards for Cultural Heritage Conservation. The City of Port Adelaide Enfield, in partnership with the Renewal SA's "Our Port", commissioned a public sculpture which celebrates the strong Aboriginal connection to this place. The sculpture is a marker on the Mudlangga to Yertabulti Track, which showcases Aboriginal people's stories about Port Adelaide and Lefevre Peninsula.

The annual series of performances known as Adhocracy, presented by Vitalstatistix theatre company, uses Hart's Mill as one of its venues for performances.

Various facilities and venues are able to be hired for public events, including Hart's Mill Lawns, Hart's Mill Market Space, and the Flour Shed.
