= Port Adelaide =

Port Adelaide Yertabulti
- Suburb
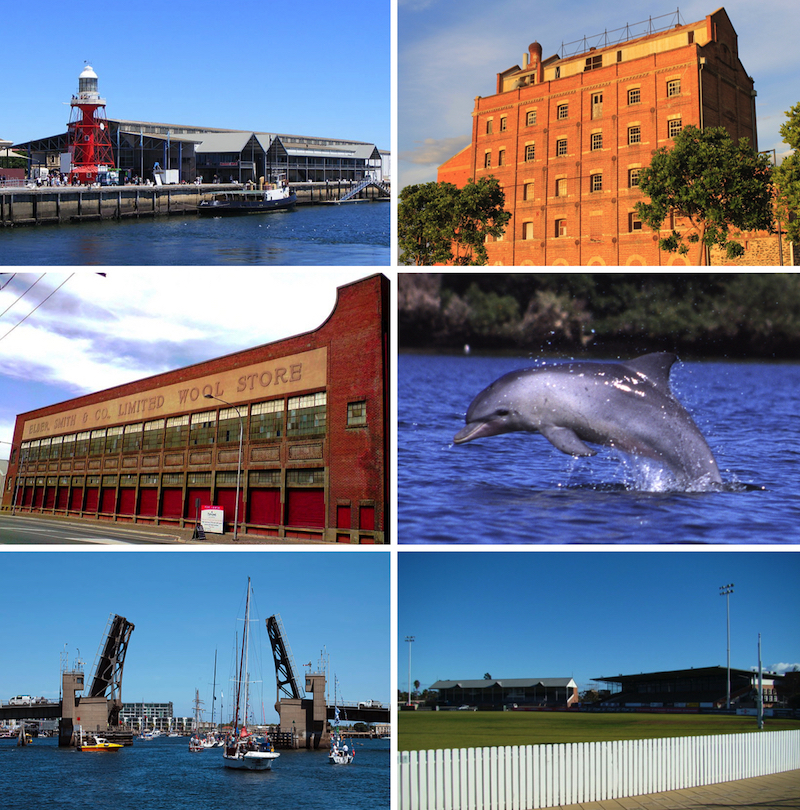
- Clockwise, from top: Port Adelaide Lighthouse and Fishermen's Wharf Market, Hart's Mill, Port River Dolphin, Alberton Oval, Birkenhead Bridge, Wool Stores
- Interactive map of Port Adelaide
- Country: Australia
- State: South Australia
- City: Adelaide
- LGA: City of Port Adelaide Enfield
- Location: 14 km (8.7 mi) from Adelaide CBD
- Established: 1836

Government
  - State electorate: Port Adelaide
  - Federal division: Hindmarsh

Population
  - Total: 1,338 (SAL 2021)
- Postcode: 5015
Suburbs around Port Adelaide
Taperoo	Torrens Island	Garden Island
Largs North; Largs Bay; Peterhead; Birkenhead; New Port; Glanville; Ethelton	Port Adelaide	Gillman
Semaphore Park	West Lakes; Queenstown; Alberton	Rosewater

Port Adelaide is a port-side region of Adelaide, approximately 14 kilometres (8.7 mi) northwest of the Adelaide CBD. It is also the namesake of the City of Port Adelaide Enfield council, a suburb, a federal and state electoral division and is the main port for the city of Adelaide. Port Adelaide played an important role in the formative decades of Adelaide and South Australia, with the port being early Adelaide's main supply and information link to the rest of the world. Its Kaurna name, although not officially adopted as a dual name, is Yertabulti.

== History ==
Prior to European settlement Port Adelaide was covered with mangrove swamps and tidal mud flats, and lay next to a narrow creek. At this time, it was inhabited by the Kaurna people, who occupied the Adelaide Plains, the Barossa Valley, the western side of the Fleurieu Peninsula, and northwards past Snowtown. The Kaurna people called the Port Adelaide area 'Yertabulti', and the whole estuarine area of the Port River.

The entrance to this creek, the Port River, was first reported by Europeans in 1831. It was explored by Europeans when Captain Henry Jones entered in 1834. The creek's main channel was then fed by numerous smaller creeks, and was 2–4 fathoms (4–7 m) deep. The navigable channel was narrow and the creek soon faded into swamps and sandhills. At low tide the channel was surrounded by mudbanks. Dry and solid land ended near present-day Alberton.

=== 1836: Deciding on Adelaide's port ===
Colonel William Light began closely exploring the area in late 1836, while deciding on a site for the colony of South Australia's port. After initial trepidation, he reported to the Colonisation Commissioners that the location was a suitable harbour. By this time it had acquired the name "the port creek". Light's choice of separating the port and city of Adelaide was strongly opposed by a few merchants, a newspaper and Governor John Hindmarsh. This opposition was largely based on the distance between them. The division of power in the colony meant that the final decision was Light's alone. He kept Adelaide and the port separate principally due to the lack of fresh water at the port.

=== 1837: Port Creek Settlement ===
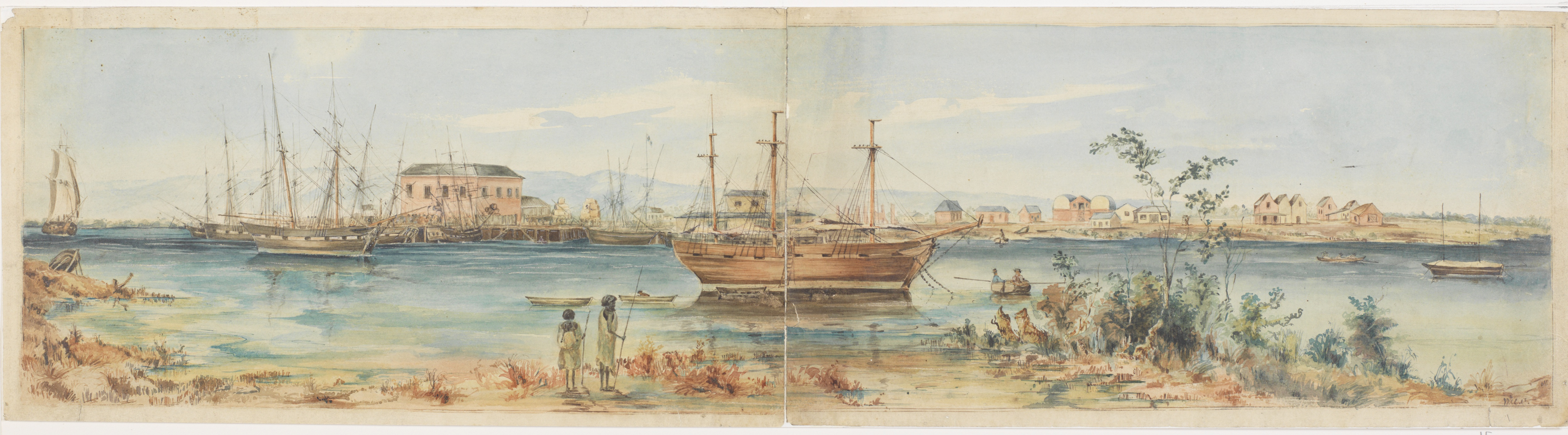
Port Adelaide, South Australia, 1847, by William Anderson Cawthorne

The effective foundation day of Port Adelaide was 6 January 1837. On this day the first harbourmaster, Captain Thomas Lipson (Royal Navy), took up residence with his family on the edge of Port Creek. The new port was used for shipping later that month, and passengers began disembarking the next. At this point the site was known as The Port Creek Settlement.

When founded, the port's land was just higher than the surrounding tidal flats; at high tide the port could be rowed around. The port had a significant problem—reported in letters from Light and complaints to the Governor from ship owners—of a lack of a fresh water supply. At first the river was not used for larger ships. They had to land at Holdfast Bay until the port was charted. This early port was plagued by mosquitoes, was a comparative long distance from Adelaide, had few amenities and had a risk of inundation when the tide was very high. By 1840 it had acquired the name "Port Misery"; the name was widely used in news reports. It was first coined in a book credited to T. Horton James, probably a pseudonym, and comes from a line stating:

This is Port Adelaide! Port Misery would be a better name; for nothing in any other part of the world can surpass it in every thing that is wretched and inconvenient.

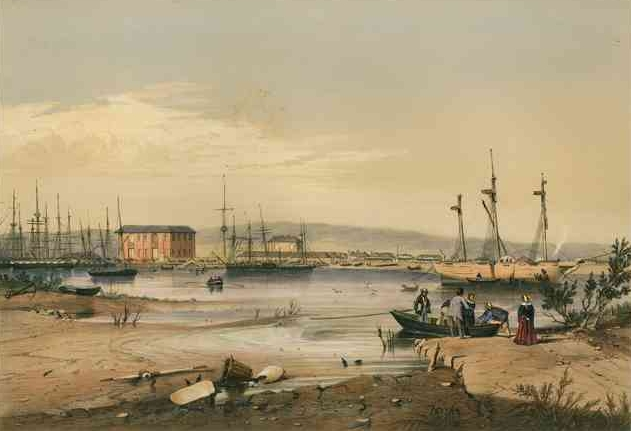
George French Angas, Port Adelaide, 1846, State Library of South Australia

The original drawings of Adelaide City Plan by Light show that he envisaged a canal (sea communication) between Port Adelaide and the City of Adelaide. The canal was not built; it would have required a massive investment that was not available at the time. A plan of a proposed "Grand Junction Canal" between Adelaide and the North Arm, by engineer Edward Snell was produced in 1851, with an exhibition of his "A Bird's Eye View of the Country Between Adelaide and the North Arm", showing the proposed canal.

By early 1838, large vessels could only get as far as the end of Gawler Reach (near the current Birkenhead Bridge). Arrivals had to use smaller boats, traverse the mangrove swamps at low tide and climb sandhills to reach the road to Adelaide. A canal for the loading of sailing ships was constructed in 1838, and town acreages nearby surveyed and sold. By the years end deficiencies of the canal were clear. The canal was dry for most of the day and cargo movement very slow. Seagoing ships had to stop some distance from the settlement due to the mudbanks. Cargo and passengers covered the remaining distance in ships' boats. All had to traverse 2–300 m of swamps after landing to reach sandhills, and eventually the road to Adelaide. The new port's first maritime casualty was the migrant ship Tam O'Shanter that ran aground on the outer sand bar. Later a small waterway in the port was named after the ship; the waterway later became the Port Adelaide Canal.

=== 1840–1860: Finalisation of wharf locations ===
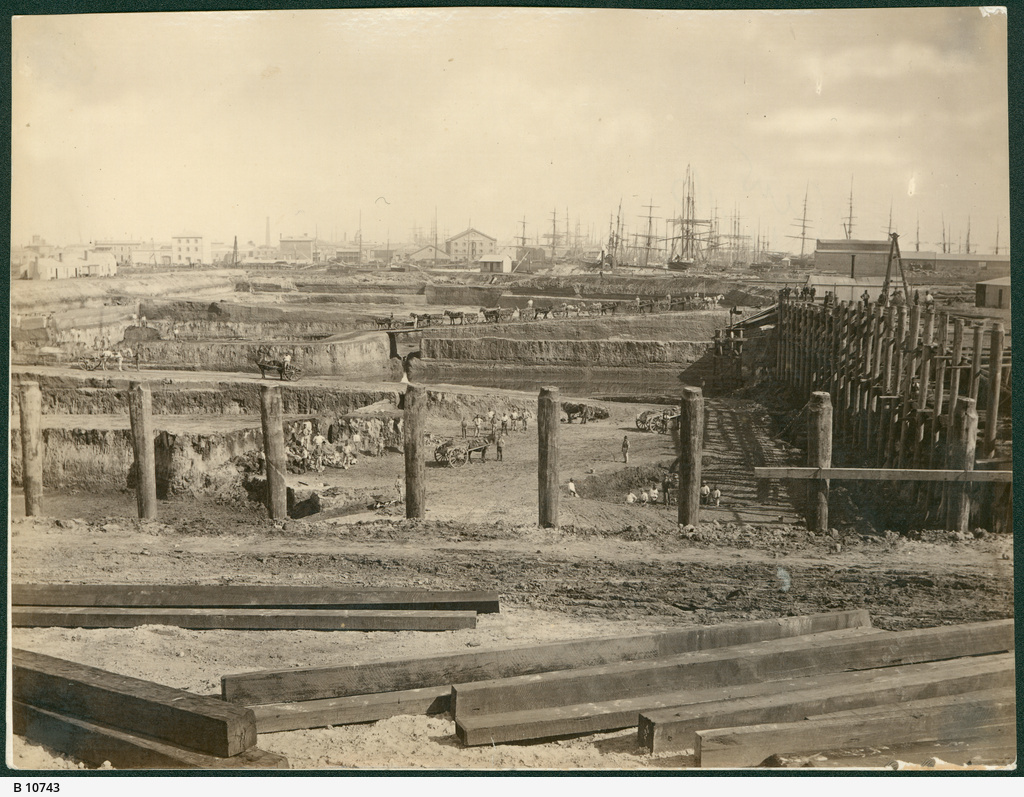
Excavation of the Port Dock at Port Adelaide, 1879

The port's initial location was intended to be temporary. The location for a proper port was chosen by Governor George Gawler, between the original settlement and the Governor's preferred location at the junction of the North Arm and the Port River. One reason for the chosen site was Gawler's instructions on leaving England to limit expenditure; the North Arm site would have required more transport infrastructure and reclamation work. Gawler awarded a tender allowing the South Australian Company to construct a private wharf, again partly to limit government expenditure. Along with the wharf they were to construct a warehouse and roadway. The roadway was to be a 100 feet (30 m) wide and run from the port to dry land, a distance of approximately 1 mile (1.6 km). This first wharf was built near the end of the modern Commercial Road.

The wharf, known as McLaren Wharf, was finished in 1840 and named after David McLaren, company manager of the South Australian Company. McLaren Wharf was 336 feet (102 m) long and 15 feet (4.6 m) deep at low tide. Contrary to usual practice, it was allowed to be built at the low water mark, which made construction simpler. The wharf, warehouse and road were opened by Governor Gawler in October 1840. The opening procession from the old port to the new included over 1,000 people; then the largest assembly of colonists to date. The procession included 600 horsemen and 450 vehicles, almost all of the colony's wheeled transportation. At the opening a parcel was ceremonially landed from the barque Guiana. Upon opening, the port could accommodate vessels up to 530 long tons (539 t). In May 1841 John Hill became the original holder of the land grant for all the land south of St Vincent Street, reaching to Tam O'Shanter Creek (later the Port Canal), comprising 134 acres and known as Section 2112. Much of this land was a tidal mangrove swamp, being reclaimed by successive owners over many decades.

During reclamation work, the ground level was raised by approximately 9 feet (3 m), with mud and silt from dredging work. Early houses had their ground floors below the now raised ground level; some had steps built down from road level. The Port Admiral Hotel's original ground floor now forms part of its basement. The last major reclamation was of the Glanville Reserve in 1892.

By the mid-1840s, with increasing trade, the wharves proved insufficient and some more private wharves were constructed. During the late 1850s the state of the dry and dusty plain, between Adelaide and Port Adelaide, led to the pejorative terms "Dustholia" and "Mudholia" in summer and winter.

=== 1860–1970: Port Adelaide's heyday ===
In 1874 the Port Adelaide Institute began construction of its new headquarters which opened to much fanfare two years later providing the organisation a place to house a library and provide a reading room, museum, lecture hall and classrooms for the area.

Gas street lighting was erected by the local council in 1881. The town received its first electric lighting in January 1889, lit with the colony's first town supply from a powerhouse in Nile Street. By 1876 it was estimated that there were 5,000 living in 500 houses. More measured figures were 3,013 residents recorded in the 1881 census and 5005—living in approximately 1000 houses—recorded in the 1891 census. By 1911 the port was the State's second largest city and had a population over half that of Adelaide city.

Due to the presence of the Jewish community at the time the east side of Todd Street became known colloquially as "Jerusalem" or "Little Jerusalem". Beginning in the 1880s a strong Scandinavian community lived in Port Adelaide largely due to their affiliation with sea-faring trades. In 1883 the Port Adelaide Caledonian Society was founded and continues to this day. In the 1880s during Christmas Chinese lanterns were hung around Port Adelaide.

A significant part of Port Adelaide’s early 20th-century industrial base was fertiliser and chemicals. In 1882 Robert Burns Cuming founded the Adelaide Chemical Works at New Thebarton, which expanded production of sulphuric acid and superphosphate and, in 1900, established a second plant at Port Adelaide. Bulk phosphate rock consignments began arriving in 1901, supporting larger-scale manufacture for South Australian wheat and pastoral districts. In 1904 the enterprise was registered as the Adelaide Chemical and Fertilizer Company Limited by 1917 output was reported at around 45,000 tons per year. The Port Adelaide operations later formed part of mergers and rationalisations in the fertiliser trade during the mid-20th century, including linkages to Cuming Smith.

During the rest of the 1800s harbour facilities expanded and the town grew. It gained an impressive range of commercial and institutional buildings. Many have survived, resulting in Port Adelaide having one of the best concentrations of colonial buildings in South Australia. Their significance was recognised in May 1982, when a sizeable part of the town centre was declared a State Heritage Area.

The construction of the Outer Harbor took place at the beginning of the 20th century, accommodating larger ships and reducing the time needed to sail up the Port River to the inner harbour. In the 1920s and 1930s the first wharf was removed or disappeared and the Port Adelaide wharves underwent a significant reconstruction programme, changing the face of the inner harbour's waterfront.

In 1876 the Port Adelaide Institute moved into its new headquarters on the corner of Commercial Road and Nile Street

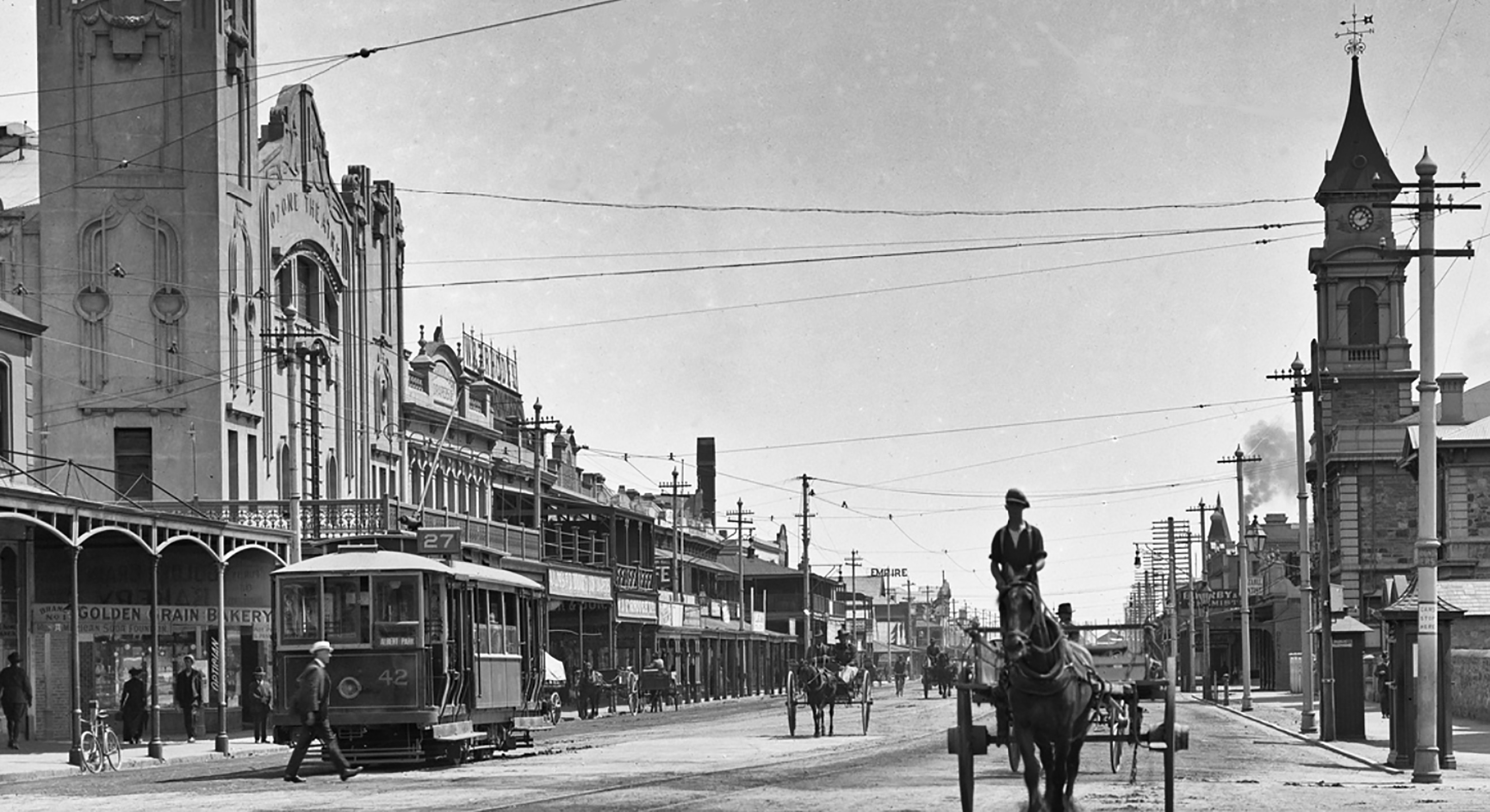
A tram on St Vincent Street, 1919

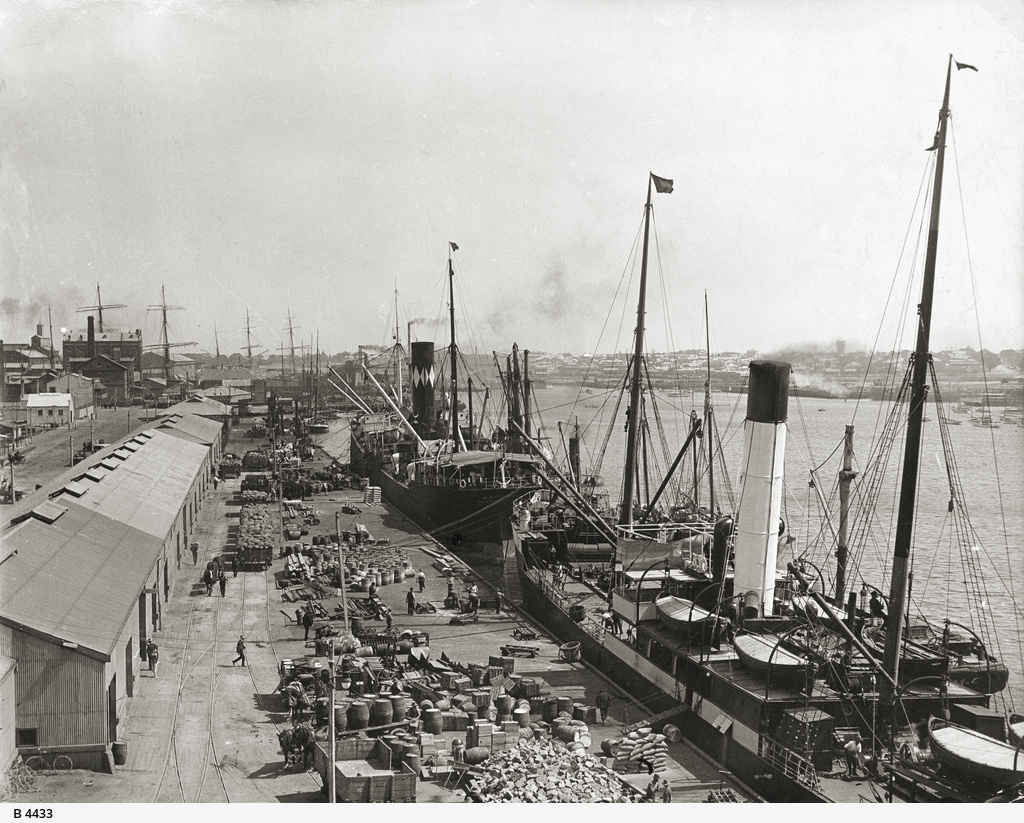
Loading cargo onto ships at Queen's Wharf, circa 1927

Nautical chart showing the inner and outer Harbours about 1942

=== 1970–2010: Economic slowdown ===
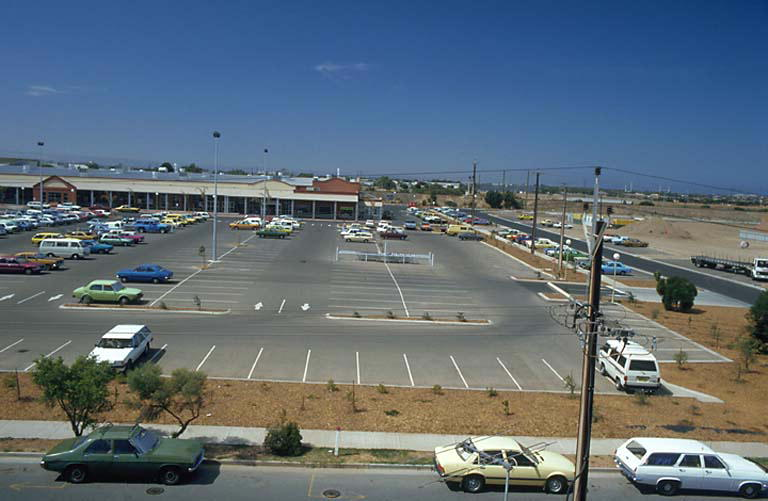
Aerial view of Kmart, 1986. Throughout the 1980s the popularity of the suburb had declined, and it was little more than a commercial precinct for its adjacent suburbs.

The introduction of containerisation in the 1960s had a major impact on the Port, changing cargo handling methods and significantly reducing the size of the local workforce.

Compounding the effect of a declining workforce on business activity, competition for shoppers arrived in the form of regional shopping centres. Up until the 1960s the Port had been second only to Adelaide as a shopping and commercial precinct. The opening of shopping centres in nearby suburbs led to a general decline in retail turnover. Activity in the suburb has declined significantly from its heyday, leaving parts empty and derelict. Historic buildings were closed and sometimes vandalised, shops in the main streets were left empty and boarded up.

Redevelopment of the waterfront was first publicly discussed in 1975. Over the following years, plans and costs were proposed and discussed but most lapsed without action.

By 2002, the "Newport Quays" consortium was the government's preferred bidder for a $1.2 billion project to cover 51 hectares (130 acres) of underused land. The development was unveiled in 2003 and land sales began two years later. This development was stated to be worth $1.5 billion and would comprise 2000 homes, construction of which would create 4000 jobs.

In 2004 Premier Mike Rann announced that a dolphin sanctuary would be established in the Port River and Barker Inlet covering 118 square kilometres, the first "urban" dolphin sanctuary in the world. In 2005 the Adelaide Dolphin Sanctuary Act was enacted.

By 2006 Newport Quays was being criticised for its poor planning for a residential development, criticism that continued with each stage of the project. By early 2007, two stages of the now $2 billion development were under construction, or nearing completion, and the third's plans submitted; The plans included provision for a 100-berth marina and one building built over the water. By 2008 reports showed the resale value of some properties in the developments were under the initial cost. The local council estimated that less than half of finished properties were occupied.

In October 2009 it was named, by the National Trust of Australia, as one of the country's most at risk heritage sites. A lack of people living in, and travelling to, Port Adelaide is seen as the major cause of this decline.

=== 2010 – present: Port Adelaide renaissance ===
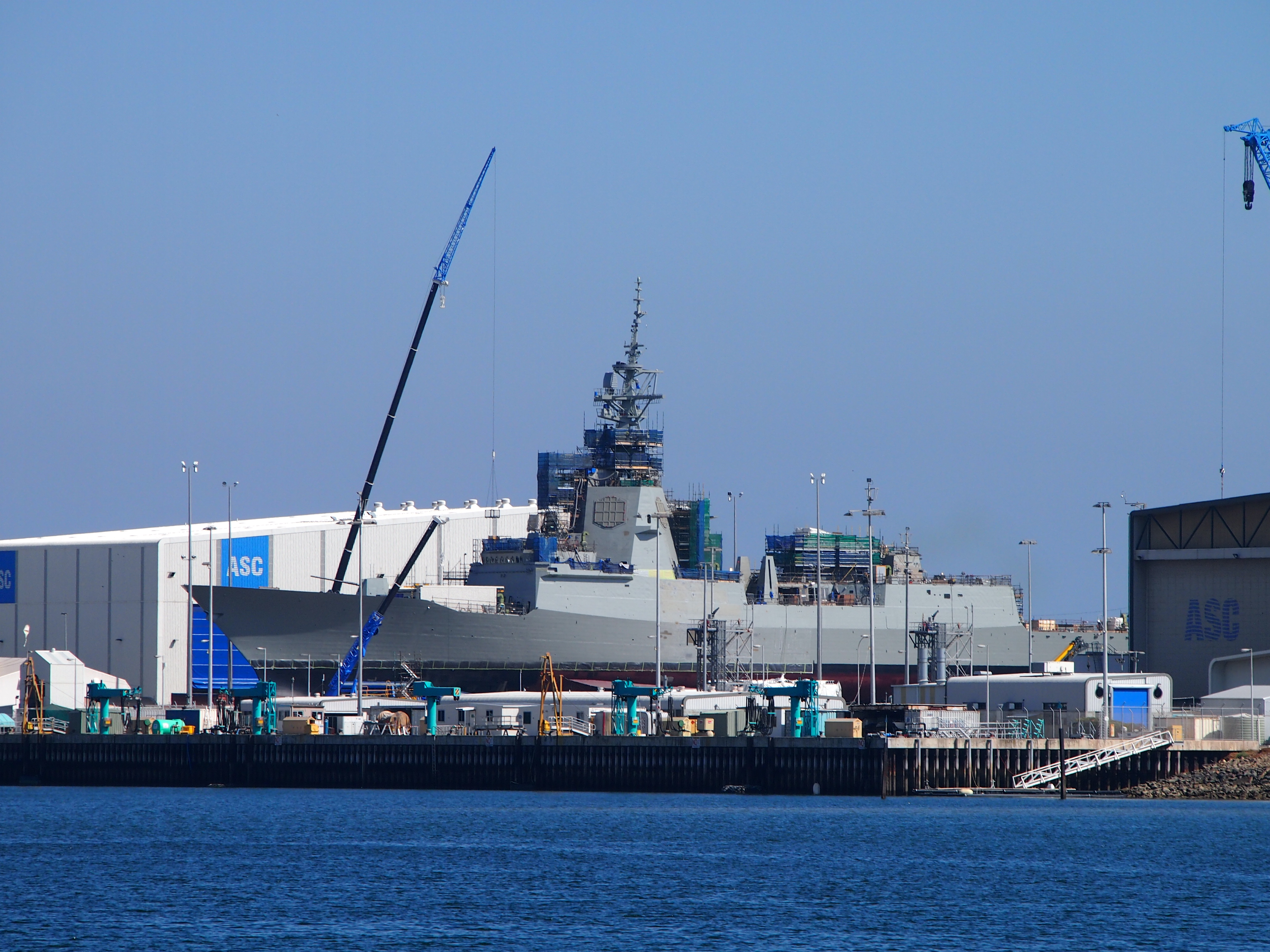
HMAS Hobart under construction by ASC at Osborne on the Port River.

In February 2010 Premier Mike Rann opened the $400 million Techport naval construction hub at Osborne (next to the Australian Submarine Corporation's facility) to underpin the development of the Navy's $8 billion Air Warfare Destroyer program and other naval construction projects. Techport features the largest ship lift in the Southern Hemisphere.

In 2015–16 Quest Hotel Consortium built a $25 million apartment building on the corner of McLaren Wharf and the Birkenhead Bridge.

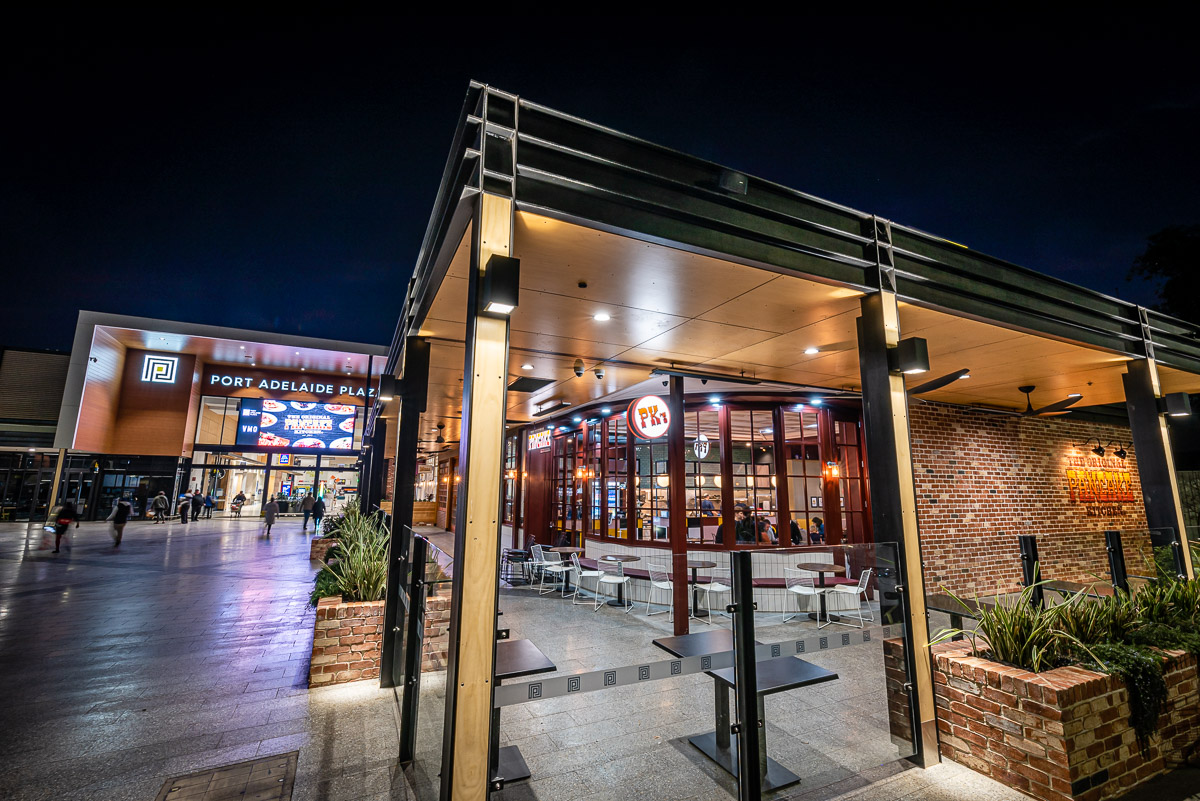
The Port Adelaide Plaza cost $45m to build and opened in 2019.

In 2016 it was announced that Starfish Developments and Cedar Woods had won tenders to develop 23ha of vacant waterfront land in the inner Port Adelaide harbour with total investment exceeding $1 billion. The development was later renamed Fletcher's Slip after a nearby historic landmark. In 2016 the Federal Government announced that DCNS had won the tender to build 12 submarines for the Royal Australian Navy in a $50 billion deal, with construction taking place in Port Adelaide. In 2016 the South Australian State Government indicated it is interested in re-establishing the tram network from the City to Port Adelaide, with links to Outer Harbor and Semaphore.

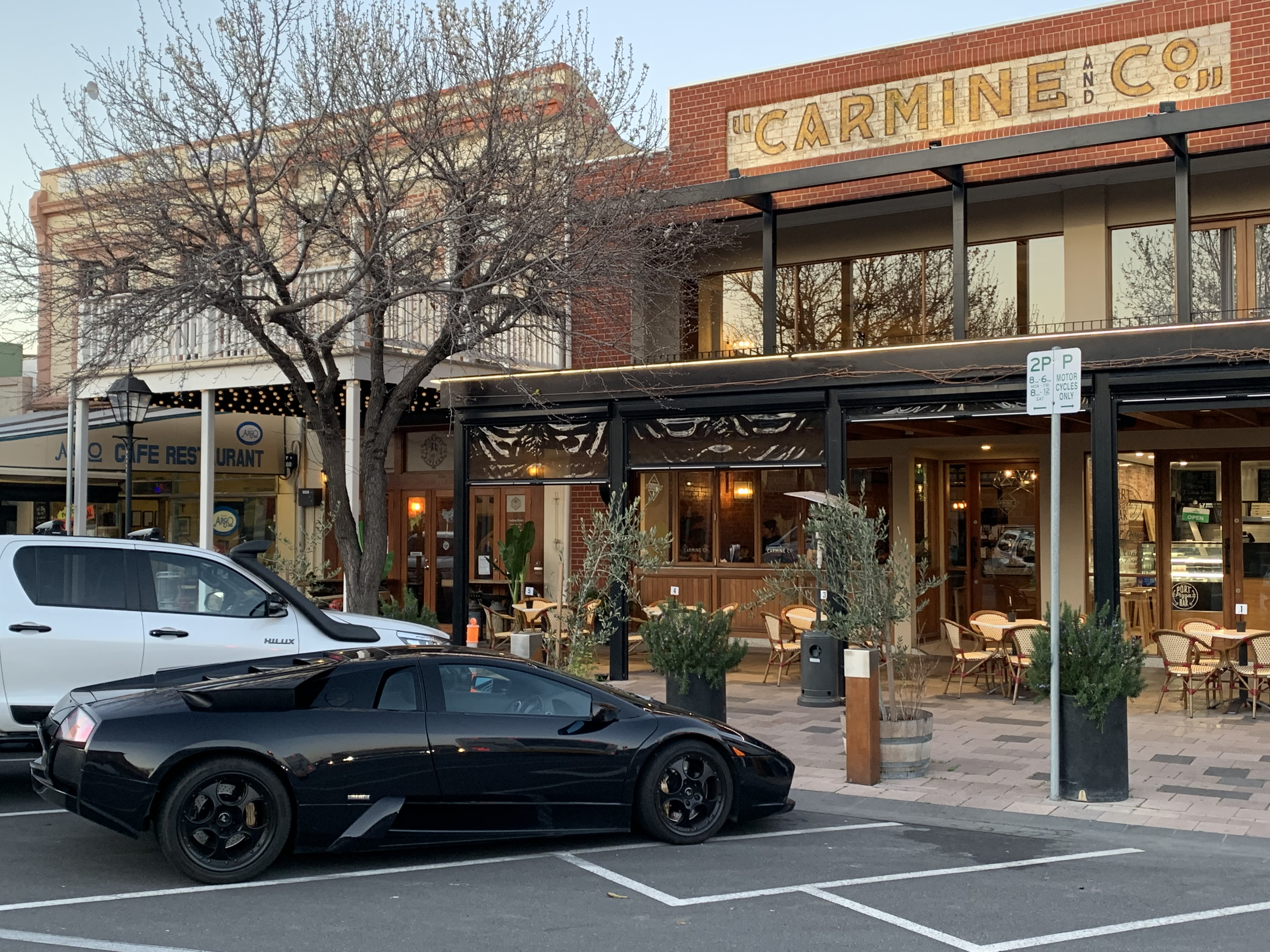
East side of Commercial Road in 2019, showing (L to R) Argo's Hellenic Cafe Restaurant (Greek), Miss Viet Kitchen (Vietnamese), and Carmine and Co (Italian)

In 2017 developer EPC Pacific began construction of a $38 million office tower on Nelson Street in Port Adelaide that will house public servants. In 2021 this building was purchased by Centuria for $63 million. In 2017 the Port Admiral Hotel was reopened after a $1m redevelopment. It is one of the oldest buildings in Port Adelaide built in 1849. In 2017 Daniella Guevera from Mexico City opened La Popular Taqueria in Port Adelaide.

In 2018, Pirate Life Breweries announced it would be relocating in Port Adelaide into a $15m refurbished warehouse. In 2018, Precision Group began the redevelopment of the Port Canal Shopping Centre as Port Adelaide Plaza.

In January 2020 the first instance of a house to selling for $1 million in the suburb of Port Adelaide was recorded. In 2020, the first residents moved in to new townhomes constructed as part of Starfish's Dock One development. Once completed, Dock One will comprise approximately 650 new homes. In 2020 the Port Adelaide Pirates Soccer Club moved to their new home on the Peninsula after $9.2 million in investments for the Taperoo sports complex.

In 2021 the Newmarket Hotel in Port Adelaide was purchased for $4 million.

== Heritage buildings ==
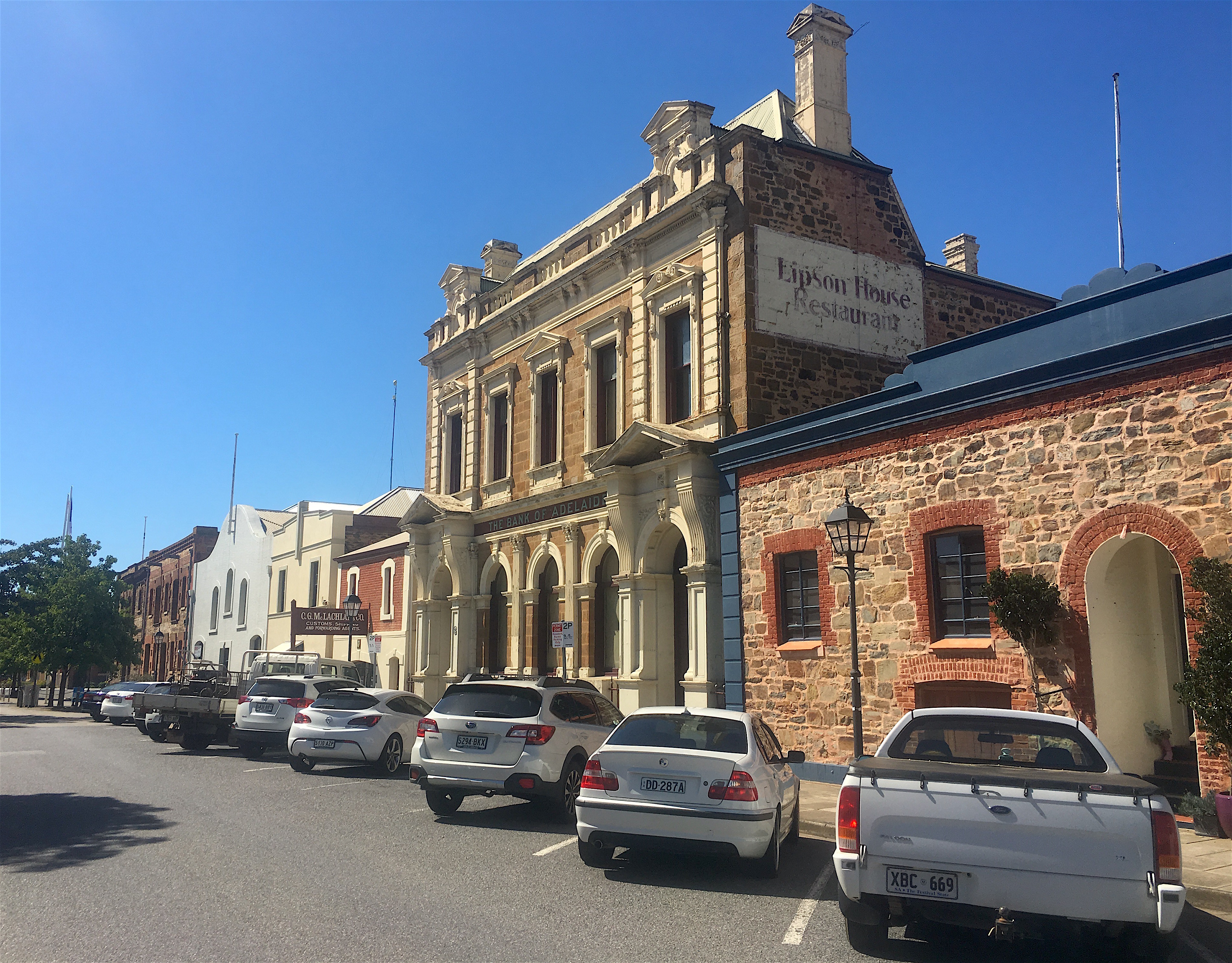
Lipson Street

Port Adelaide is known for its well preserved 19th-century pubs and hotels, reflecting the area's maritime history in catering to the sailors of trading ships.

=== Streetscapes ===
During the rest of the 1800s harbour facilities expanded and the town grew. It gained an impressive range of commercial and institutional buildings. Many have survived, resulting in Port Adelaide having one of the best concentrations of colonial buildings in South Australia. Their significance was recognised in May 1982, when a sizeable part of the town centre was declared a State Heritage Area.

Prominent South Australian architect F. Kenneth Milne designed a woolstore for Goldsbrough Mort & Co. sometime before 1929.

=== Town Hall ===
The Port Adelaide Enfield Council Offices building, designed by Christopher Arthur Smith and built as Port Adelaide Town Hall in 1939, was heritage-listed on the South Australian Heritage Register on 24 July 1980.

=== Pubs and hotels ===
List of hotels and pubs in Port Adelaide
Port Admiral Hotel	1849
Birkenhead Riverview Tavern	1877
The British Hotel	1847
Dockside Tavern	1850
First Commercial Inn	1841
The Lighthouse Hotel	1857
Newmarket Hotel	1879
Port Anchor Hotel	1873
Port Dock Brewery Hotel	1855
Railway Hotel	1856
Royal Arms Hotel	1878

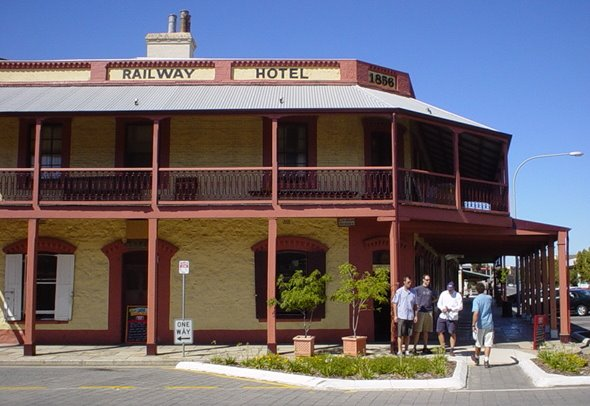
The Railway Hotel, opposite the site of the original Port Adelaide Railway Station

The earliest recorded hotel was the Port Hotel. It opened in 1838, two years before the port was officially declared. Three years later the First Commercial Inn opened. It has the longest licensing history in the suburb, though discontinuous. It did not trade for 12 years following a fire in 1857.

The British Hotel is the longest continually licensed. It opened 1847 as a single storey building, and was rebuilt with two further storeys in 1876 for then-owner Henry Ayers. The South Australian Brewing Company acquired it in 1937. It was known from c. 1907–1952 as "McGraths British Hotel". Dockside Tavern is one of the few Late Victorian style buildings remaining in the Port. It was opened as the Britannia Hotel in 1850 then was rebuilt on site in 1898, in contemporary style. It was renamed as the Dockside Tavern in 2002. The Golden Port Tavern is on the corner of Vincent and Robe Streets. On this site the Carpenters' Arms Tavern opened in late 1850. The Arms burned down in 1865 and was replaced with the current hotel, then known as The Globe. The hotel's name was changed to the current one in 1981.

Black Diamond Square—named after the Black Diamond Hotel—is the main intersection of Port Adelaide, at the north end of Commercial Road. The hotel was designed by Adelaide architect William Wier. It opened as the White Horse Cellars Inn in 1851, with an integral 600 seat theatre. Parts of the building were used for an early freemason hall, library and the Port Adelaide Institute. It was renamed as the Family Hotel in 1876, then as the Black Diamond Hotel c. 1878. This last name came from the Black Diamond Line shipping company. From 1866 to 1883 Cannon brand beer was brewed in the hotel. The building was converted to retail shops in 1884 and the Central Hotel erected on the south side.

Port Dock Brewery hotel won business awards as best hotel and restaurant in 2001. It was built in 1855 and opened as the Dock Hotel. The current building structure results from an 1883 rebuild, with stone from Dry Creek near Yatala Labour Prison. The Hotel lost its licence in 1909, after a 1906 Opinion Vote. The building was renovated, part of it converted into a small brewery, and reopened as a hotel in 1986. Railway Hotel opened in 1856 opposite the new Port Adelaide railway station, a month before the line to Adelaide was opened. The hotel retains many original features including leadlight windows and an 1890s glass fanlight.

Peter Sagan standing in front of the Port Admiral Hotel at the start of the 2018 Tour Down Under

Two six-roomed houses were built on the corner of Cannon Street and Church Place in 1873. They were converted into a single building and opened as the Kent Hotel in 1875. The building's exterior was restyled in Art Deco fashion in the 1940s and the interior of the hotel completely renovated in the 1990s. It is now known as the Port Anchor Hotel.

Brunswick Pier Hotel was on the corner of Vincent and Robe Streets. It opened in 1878 in what had been a butcher's shop. The hotel lost its licence in 1909, along with other hotels, after an opinion poll resulted in a reduction of the number of licences. After this the building was used as a furniture shop and a butcher's shop. During the 1920s it became a pharmacy specialising in photographic materials and "Kirby's Calcarea Teething Powders". Medical suites were leased upstairs. It was bought by Birks Chemists in 1946, and remained a pharmacy until 1996. From then to at least 2001 the building was vacant.

On the corner of Dale street is a building that was opened by the Port Adelaide Market Company in 1879, divided into shops, offices and stalls. Part of the building was later adapted to make a 17-room hotel, the Newmarket. Colac Hotel, on Ocean Steamer's Road, opened in 1881. It was built opposite the then No. 1 Dock, alongside the 1879 extension to the South Australian Company basin. The hotel has had strong ties to both the Australian Labor Party and the union movement. Both former Prime Minister Bob Hawke and local Member of Parliament Mick Young used to talk to workers at the pub. Mick Young owned the pub from 1988 to 1990 and as of 2002 it was owned by the Labor Party.

From 1838 to 1906, sixty differently named hotels had been run on 38 different sites within Port Adelaide. A local opinion poll was held in Port Adelaide and other Adelaide districts in February 1906, on the subject of liquor licensing. Port Adelaide voters supported the Temperance Party's platform, reducing the number of licences by a third. Fifteen hotels and three wine licences expired on 25 March 1909 and were not renewed.

== Geography ==
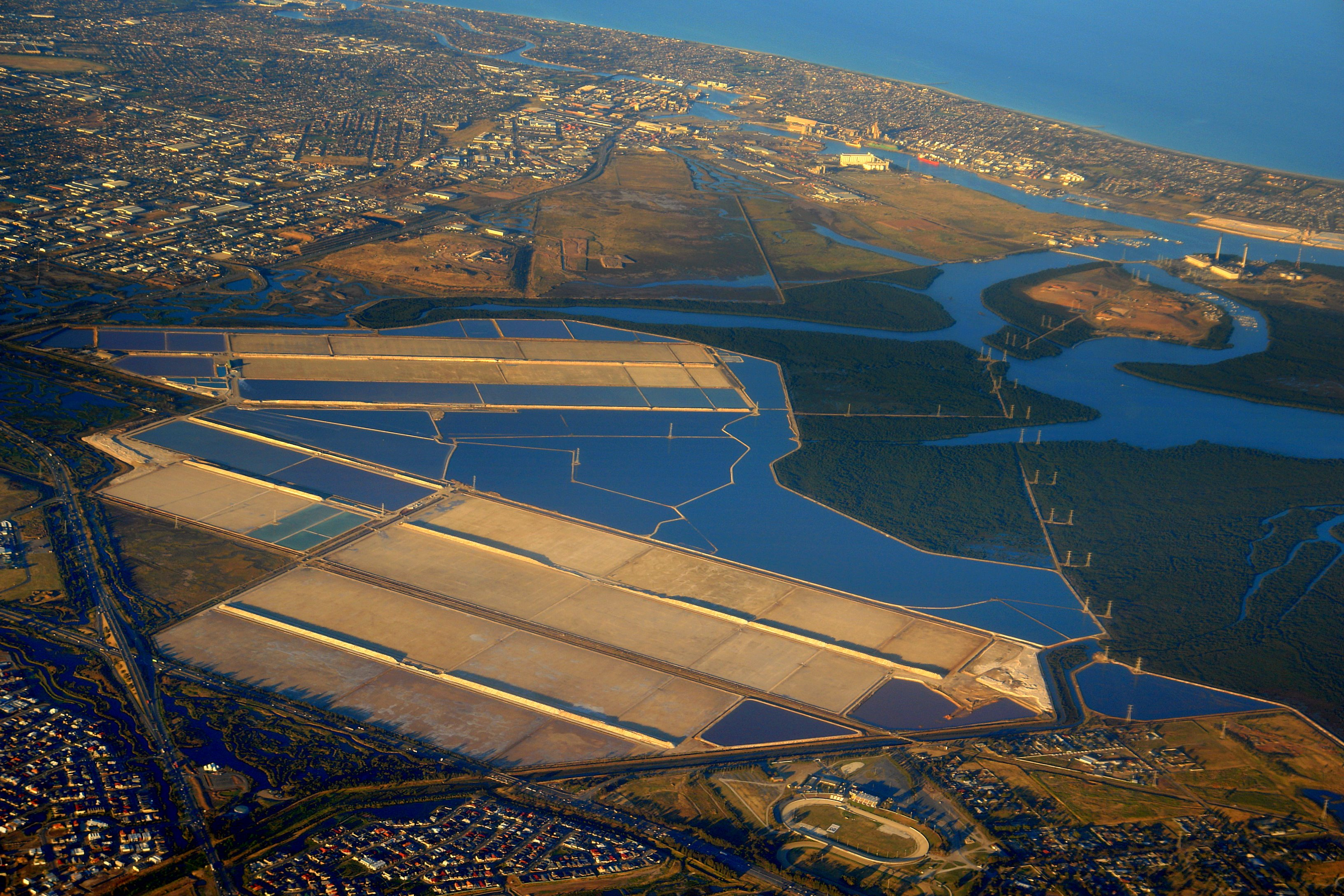
Aerial view of Port Adelaide

=== Port River ===
The Port River, known officially as the Port Adelaide river, is home to a resident population of bottlenose dolphins. The Port River's inner harbor near West Lakes and seaward from Lipson Reach feature dense stands of grey mangroves which provide habitat for hundreds of species of marine, avian and insect life. The Port River is an important recruitment area for Blue swimmer crabs, Western king prawns and other commercially important species. The river also features established colonies of a wide variety of introduced marine organisms which originally arrived in South Australia in or on ships. Over 30 introduced marine species have so far been identified in the river.

Port Adelaide is bound by the Port River and Inner Harbour to the north and west, and by Webb Street and Grand Junction Road to the south. The main strip of Port Adelaide is along St Vincent Street, with a residential area to the south of the train station along Commercial Road and Webb Street. Recent residential development has occurred along the waterfront promenade.

Port Adelaide is a tidal port, with several shipping berths along the length of the estuary.

=== Parks ===
Port Adelaide has many parks. The most recent is a $2 million refurbishment of the Hart's Mill precinct at Port Adelaide, opened in May 2014. Hart's Mill, Mundy Street, Port Adelaide SA 5015, Australia.

== Markets ==
Port Adelaide is home to various markets including the Torrens Island Food Market and the Fishermen's Wharf Market which is housed in Shed 1, the last remaining Wharf Shed in the inner Port Adelaide harbour. In December 2016 the Fisherman's Wharf Market building was scheduled to be demolished for the construction of apartments and a public plaza. The Markets where closed in August/September 2022.

== Culture and education ==
Port Adelaide is traditionally a working-class area, which stemmed from the economic activity the wharves produced and the subsequent industry.

=== Progressive movements ===
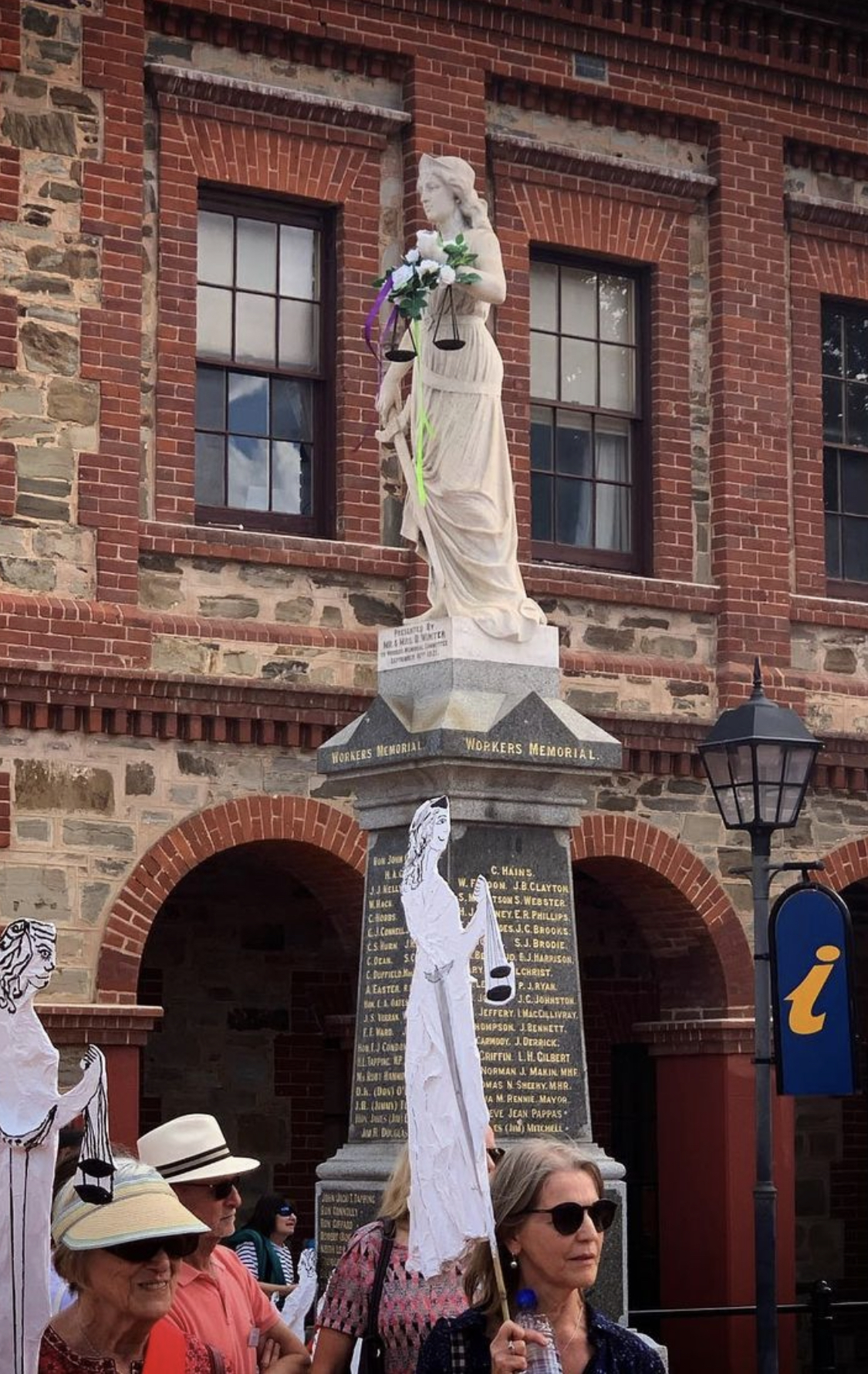
The Port Adelaide Workers Memorial pays tribute to various people who have contributed to progressive and reformist social causes.

Port Adelaide has a longstanding tradition of social reform and progressive movements. Early examples are religious leaders seeking to reduce prostitution and alcoholism amongst wharf workers in the mid-1800s. Later examples are union movements that fought for better working conditions on the wharf and surrounding industries.

Recently Port Adelaide has had a strong tradition of helping support local Indigenous populations with Kura Yerlo Community Centre and other Indigenous programs. The Port Adelaide Football Club assists to advance the lives of disadvantaged and discriminated indigenous peoples and youth. Significant people involved in these movements are often recognised on the Port Adelaide Workers Memorial at Black Diamond Corner. In 2021 the South Australian May Day celebrations took place in Port Adelaide.

=== Art ===
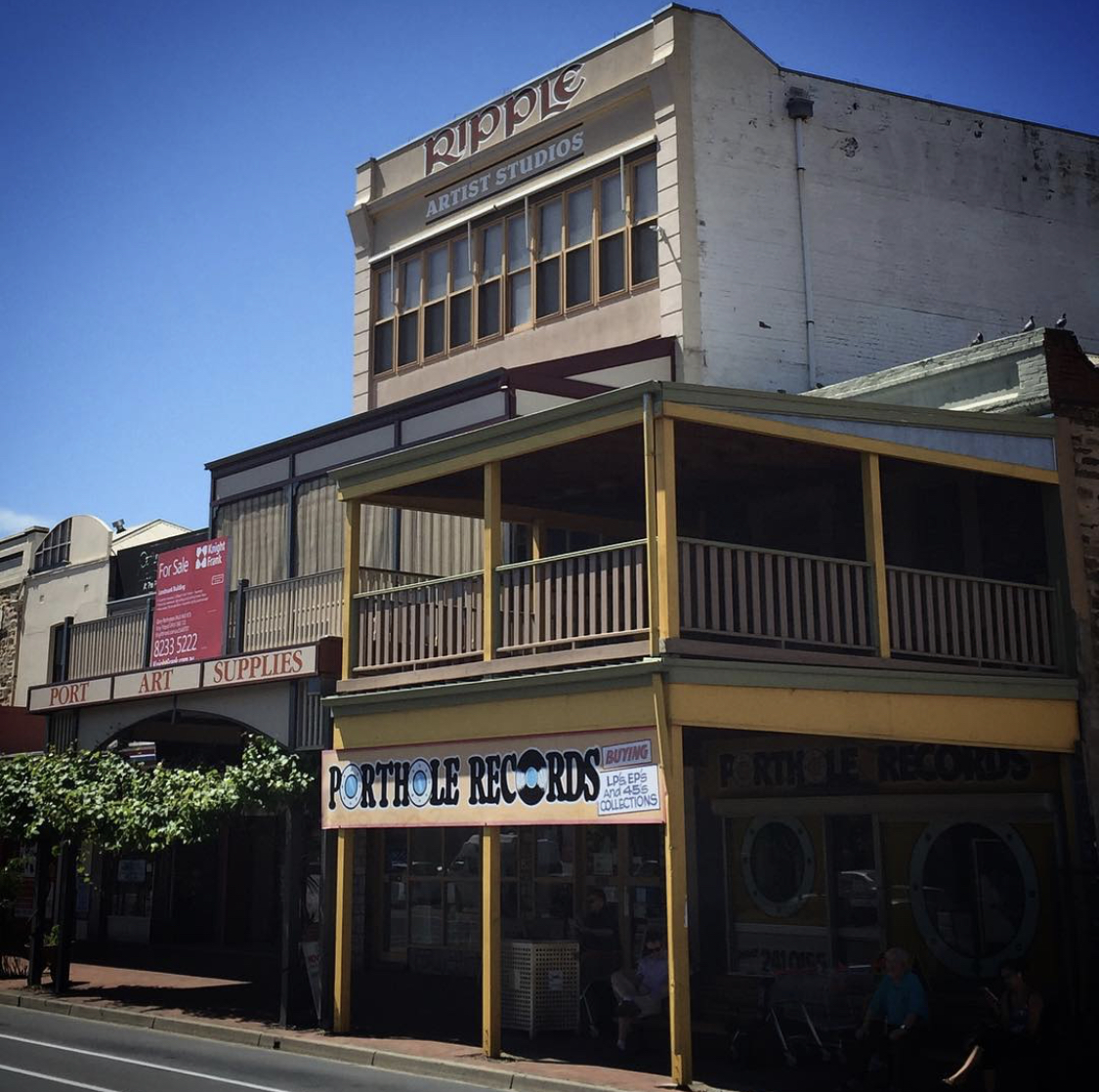
Ripple Artist Studios building, with long-time tenant Port Art Supplies below, Porthole Records next door

Impressionist painter Mortimer Menpes was born and grew up in Port Adelaide, where his father was a successful businessman. Modernist painter Margaret Preston was born in Port Adelaide and spent the first 10 years of her life in the area while her father worked as a marine engineer.

The diverse subject matter in the Port Adelaide region has proved attractive to painters and artists such as John Giles. During the 1940s John Giles would often be accompanied by friend and fellow artist Jeffrey Smart whilst working on Port Adelaide maritime paintings.

The Port Adelaide Artists Forum organises events for local artists. Galleries in the area include the Black Diamond Gallery and Gallery Yampu. The Jackalope Studio Gallery serves as a working studio, a showcase for artists and photographers, framing studio and contains a large amount of purchasable art from Mexico.

There are several public artworks in Port Adelaide, including Glow / Taltaityai, at the western end of Walter Morris Drive. Sculpted in 2009 by Michelle Nikou and Jason Milanovic, the glow-in-the-dark sculptures of ibis and emu are representations of the Tjilbruke Kaurna Dreaming story.

The Wonderwalls Festival, which involves international artists using the buildings in the area for street art, attracts around 30,000 visitors to Port Adelaide.

=== Music ===
The Hart's Mill precinct is home to various events and festivals, such as Adelaide Guitar Festival performances. The largest music festival in Port Adelaide was St Jerome's Laneway Festival, which moved there in 2014, but as of 2025 takes place in Bonython Park in the Adelaide Park Lands.

The Waterside Workers Hall is a venue used for concerts as well as performance art and comedy. Since 1992 and as of 2025 it is occupied by Vitalstatistix arts organisation.

The Largs Pier Hotel had a history of hosting early Adelaide rock bands. Jimmy Barnes wrote a song after the pub and his experiences playing there. The Port Adelaide region is home to some notable vinyl record stores such as Porthole Records and Mr V Music.

=== Educational and community facilities ===
==== Tauondi Aboriginal College ====
Tauondi Aboriginal College is located at 1 Lipson Street.

==== Yitpi Yartapuultiku ====
The Yitpi Yartapuultiku Aboriginal Cultural Centre (known as "Yitpi"), located on the banks of the river, opened on 1 June 2025, with around 11,000 people attending the opening event. Co-designed by architects and Aboriginal elders such as Lewis O'Brien, the centre and its landscaped surrounds were funded by both local government and federal funding. The surrounds are planted with native plants, including mangroves and reeds, and a bush food garden is planned. It is a place for Kaurna people to gather and share their culture, and the centre will also provide training in hospitality and tourism, as well as classes teaching language, making artefacts and bush foods, and other activities. The inaugural CEO is Lee-Ann Buckskin. Yitpi Yartapuultiku is Kaurna for "The Soul of Port Adelaide". A naming ceremony for the centre was earlier held on 16 August 2022, which included a Welcome to Country by Lewis O'Brien and a smoking ceremony by Michael O'Brien.

Ashley Halliday Architects, were selected to design the building after a tender process by Port Adelaide Enfield Council, while Warwick Keates of Wax Design were responsible for the Landscape Architecture. Construction took place between May 2023 and March 2025. The project cost was around A$35 million. The project has earned several accolades, including:

- International Architecture Exhibition of the 2023 Venice Biennale – Australian pavilion exhibition
- SA Awards for Planning Excellence 2022 – Minister's Award
- SA Awards for Planning Excellence 2022 – "Planning With Country"
- Australian Institute of Architects' South Australian Architecture Awards (June 2026), where it was described by the jury as "a standout project of masterful execution":
  - SA Architecture Medal
  - Jack McConnell Award for Public Architecture
  - COLORBOND Award for Steel Architecture
  - Derrick Kendrick Award for Sustainable Architecture

=== In film and television ===
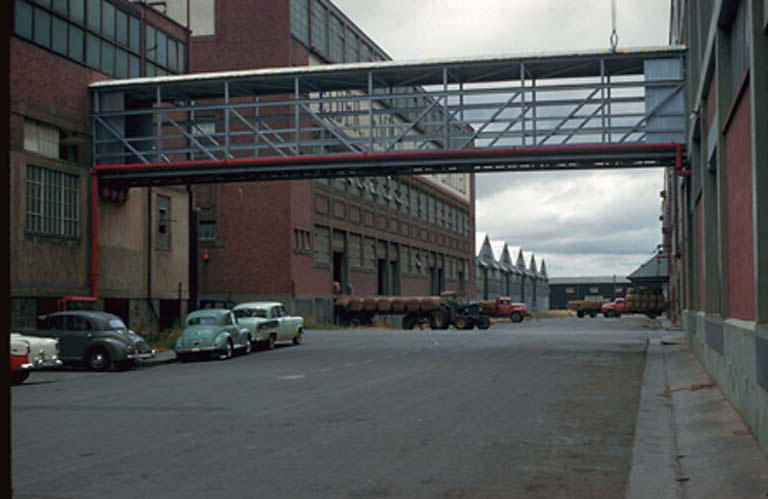
The Wool Stores of Port Adelaide were used as a backdrop for the 2021 Mortal Kombat film.

Examples of productions that have used Port Adelaide as a filming location include; Mortal Kombat (2021), Escape from Pretoria (2020), Wolf Creek (2005), Gallipoli (1981), Bad Boy Bubby (1993), Never Too Late (2020), December Boys (2007), Boys in the Trees (2016), Anzac Girls (2014), Like Minds (2006), Oranges and Sunshine (2010), Cut (2000), Thunderstruck (2004), The Flip Side (2018), Heaven's Burning (1997), The Time Guardian (1987), Dance Me to My Song (1998), Black and White (2002), Look Both Ways (2005), Playing Beatie Bow (1986), Freedom (1982), Golden Fiddles (1991), Lust and Revence (1996), In a Savage Land (1999), Deck Dogz (2005), Fever (1989), Call Me Mr. Brown (1986), Working Class Boy (2018), Wrong Side of the Road (1981), Here I Am (2011), The New Adventures of Black Beauty (1992), Ebbtide (1994), Sebastian and the Sparrow (1988), The Life of Harry Dare (1995). Youth on the March (2017), Who Killed Jenny Langby? (1974), The Hunter (2008).

== Sport ==
Port Adelaide's strong sporting tradition and culture extend into other sports with most clubs using black and white along with the magpie as their club symbols.

=== Sporting clubs ===
- Port Adelaide Athletics Club (est. 1870)
- Port Adelaide Rowing Club (est. 1877)
- Port Adelaide Sailing Club (est. 1897)
- Port Adelaide Cricket Club (est. 1897)
- Port Adelaide Cycling Club (est. 1897)
- Port Adelaide Baseball Club (est. 1889)
- Port Adelaide Pirates (Soccer) (est. 1903)
- Port Adelaide Bowling Club (est. 1903)
- Port Adelaide Rugby Union Club (est. 1933)
- Port Adelaide District Hockey Club (est. 1934)
- Port Adelaide Tennis Club (est. 1973)

=== Port Adelaide Football Club ===
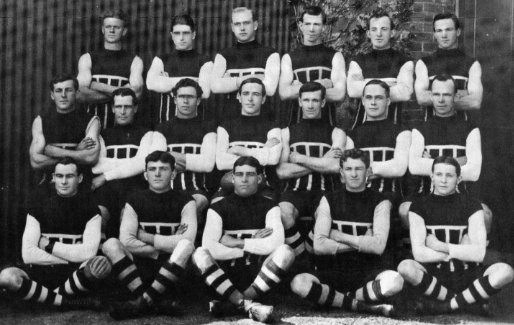
Port Adelaide Football Club's undefeated 1914 side

Port Adelaide is home to the Port Adelaide Football Club, an Australian rules football team. The club is unique in being the only pre-existing Australian rules football club from outside Victoria to gain entry into the Australian Football League.

Its headquarters and training facility and home ground for South Australian National Football League (SANFL) games is Alberton Oval. Founded in 1870, the club has competed in the SANFL from 1877 until 1996, and in the Australian Football League AFL since 1997. The club was awarded the second AFL licence in South Australia in doing so becoming the only pre-existing non-Victorian club to gain entry into the competition. It had won 34 SANFL Premierships before its move to the AFL. The club is still represented by its reserves team in the SANFL.

== Governance and politics ==
=== Local governance ===
The office of the City of Port Adelaide Enfield is in the Council Chambers in St Vincent Street. The Council area is divided into seven wards that span across 51 suburbs and the Mayor as of July 2021 is Claire Boan.

=== State politics ===
Port Adelaide is the namesake of its state electorate and its current elected representative is Susan Close (Labor).

=== Federal politics ===
Up until 2019, Port Adelaide was the namesake of its federal electorate; however, the suburb of Port Adelaide is now under the electorate of Hindmarsh and the current elected representative is Mark Butler (Labor).

== Museums ==
=== National Railway Museum ===
A railway museum was created by rail preservationists, and opened in 1963 on Railway Terrace, Mile End. The mostly outdoor exhibits remained on this site until 1988; during this period the 457 mm (18 in) gauge steam train known as Bub was built. Involvement of the History Trust of South Australia and receipt of a $2 million Australian Bicentennial Commemorative Grant enabled the museum's relocation to Port Adelaide in 1988. On 10 December of that year the Port Dock Railway Museum was opened by State Premier John Bannon. The museum was sited in the former Port Dock railway station, and retained the "Port Dock" name until 2001 when it was renamed the National Railway Museum. A significant change in 2001 was the opening of the Commonwealth Railways display pavilion. It was built with the assistance of a grant received under the Federation Grant Scheme; a scheme that commemorated the hundredth anniversary of the Federation of Australia. The pavilion was officially opened in October by the Honorable Peter McGauran, then Federal Minister for the Arts and the Centenary of Federation.

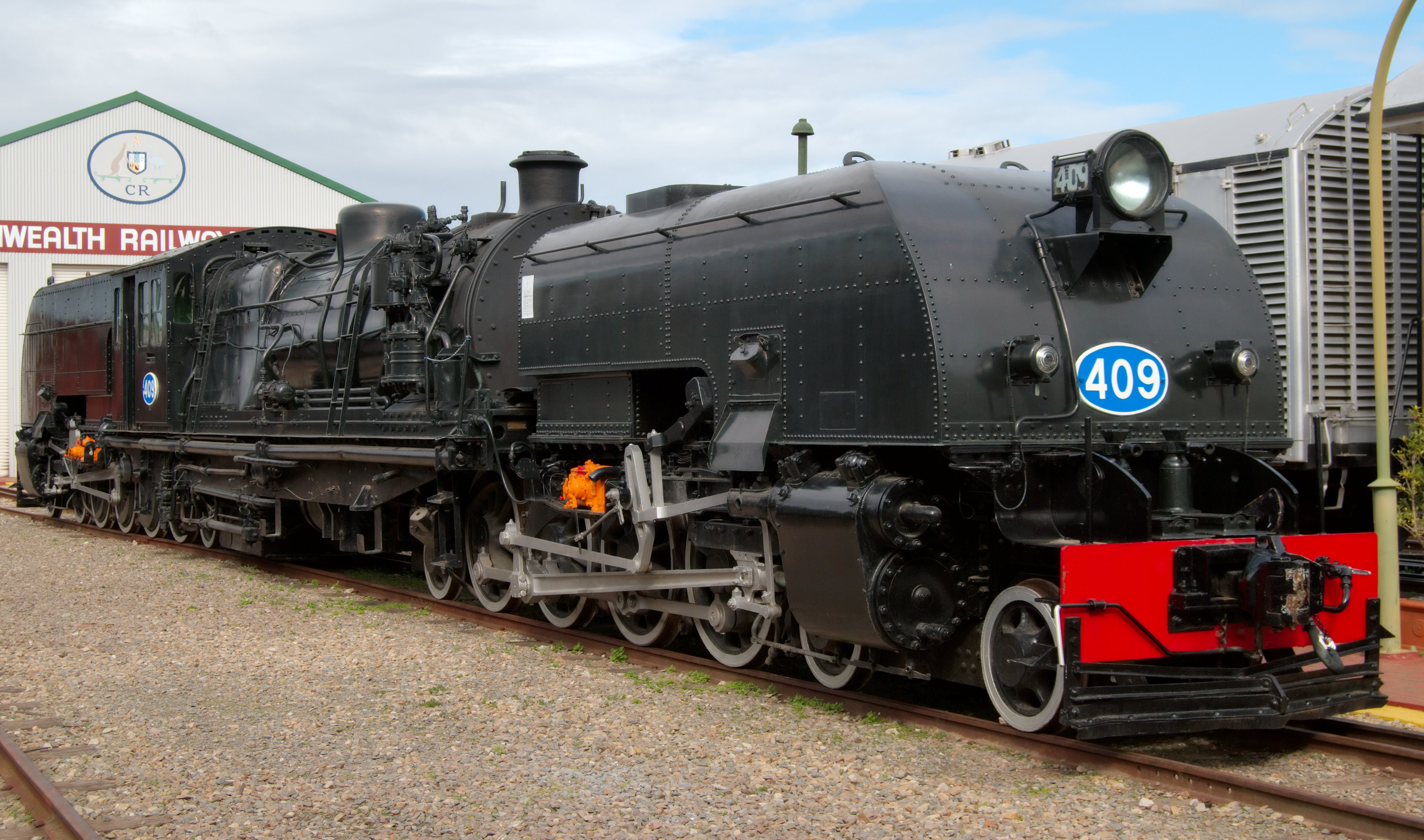
South Australian Railways 400 class 4-8-2 steam locomotive no. 409 in front of the Commonwealth Railways Pavilion

Visitors can ride in historic railway and custom-built narrow gauge carriages. Bub, a 457 mm steam locomotive, and Ken, a 457 mm diesel locomotive, take passengers on a loop track around the two main pavilions. Another 457 mm steam locomotive, Bill, is used for some of the year on a seafront rail line between Semaphore and Fort Glanville Conservation Park. Peronne, a narrow gauge steam locomotive, is used for further runs during special events. This locomotive was built in 1919 and used by Broken Hill Associated Smelters at Port Pirie until 1964.

The museum is an independent entity, run by volunteers and a small paid staff. It has track and trains representing all three main rail gauges used in South Australia: broad (1,600 mm (5 ft 3 in)); standard (1,435 mm (4 ft 8 1/2 in)); and narrow (1,067 mm (3 ft 6 in)). Locomotives and rail stock fill two large display pavilions, and are accompanied by other historic railway related displays. On site is the South Australian Heritage Register listed Port Dock Goods Shed, the last remaining building from the former railway station. It was built in the 1870s and showcases the wooden construction techniques used by the South Australian Railways in the 19th century. The museum has a railway-related retail shop, hosts special events including an Annual Friends of Thomas show. The 1947 cafeteria car, or the entire site, can be hired.

=== South Australian Maritime Museum ===
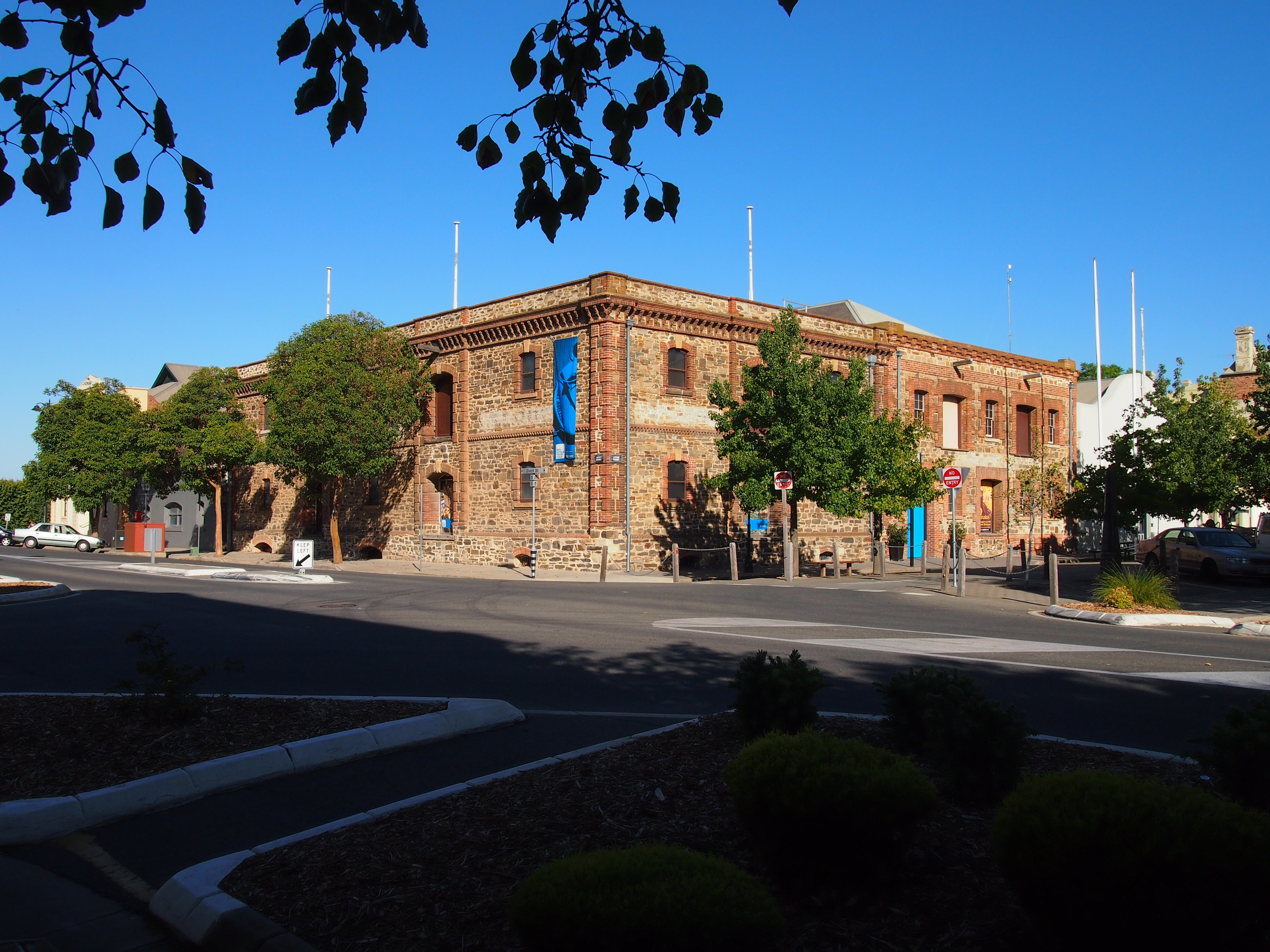
The South Australian Maritime Museum is one of Port Adelaide's most significant.

On Lipson Street, within a historic warehouse, is the South Australian Maritime Museum. The Maritime Museum builds on the legacy of previous organisations including the Port Adelaide Institute. The Museum holds in trust, a collection that the Institute founded in 1872 and is now the oldest nautical collection in Australia.

=== City of Adelaide clipper ===
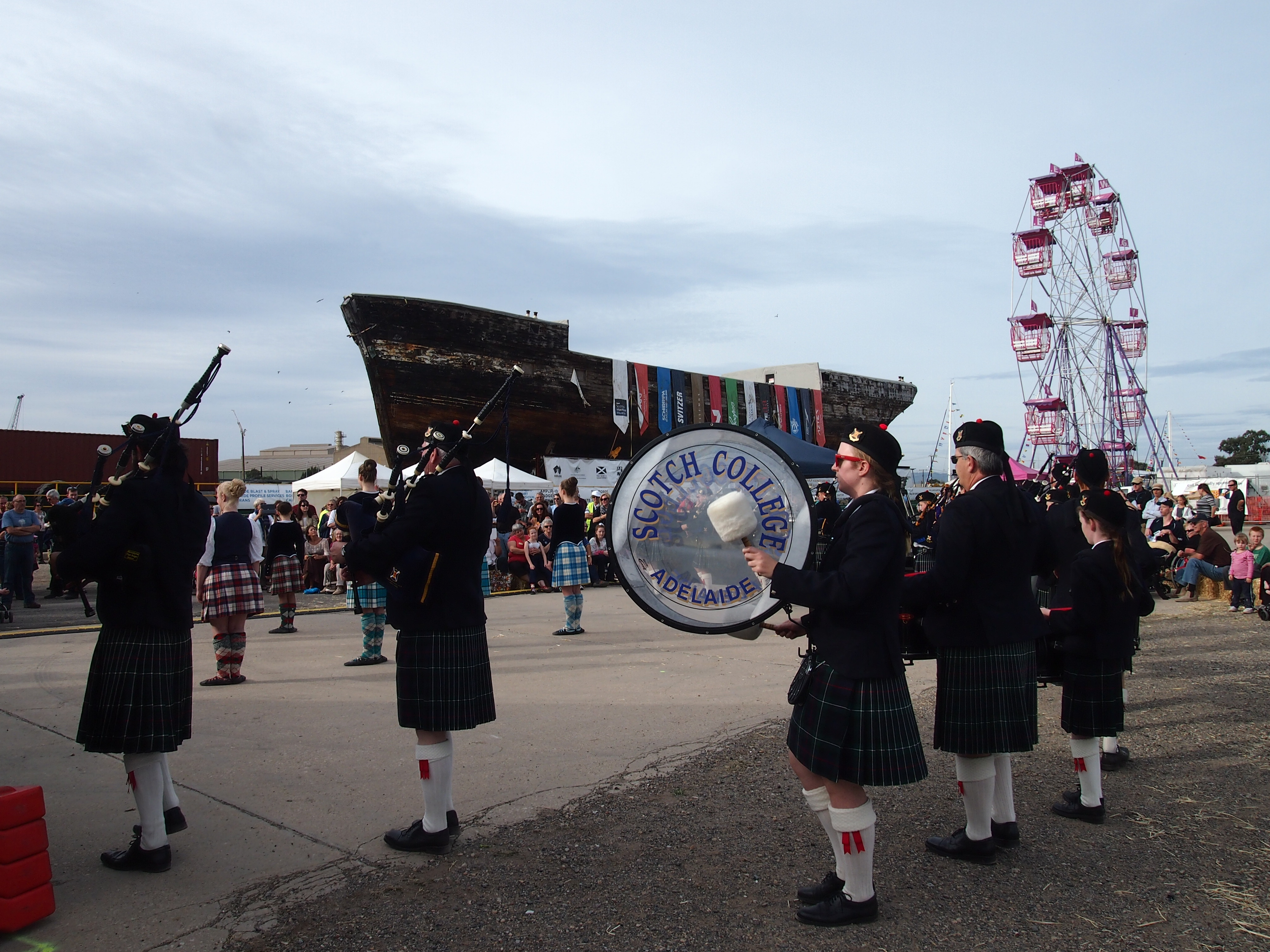
City of Adelaide, now a museum open to the public

After a 14-year campaign the City of Adelaide Preservation Trust was successful in its bid to return the historic 1864 clipper City of Adelaide from Scotland to Port Adelaide, where she finally arrived in the inner harbour on 6 February 2014.

The City of Adelaide has a strong connection with South Australia, to which she made 23 voyages between 1864 and 1886, bringing an estimated 889 passengers who came to settle in South Australia.

The clipper's hull is being temporarily stored on a barge moored in Dock 1 of the port's inner harbour for the next 6–12 months, until a permanent location is selected and prepared. A major celebration was planned for the ship's 150th anniversary, on 17 May 2014.

=== South Australian Aviation Museum ===
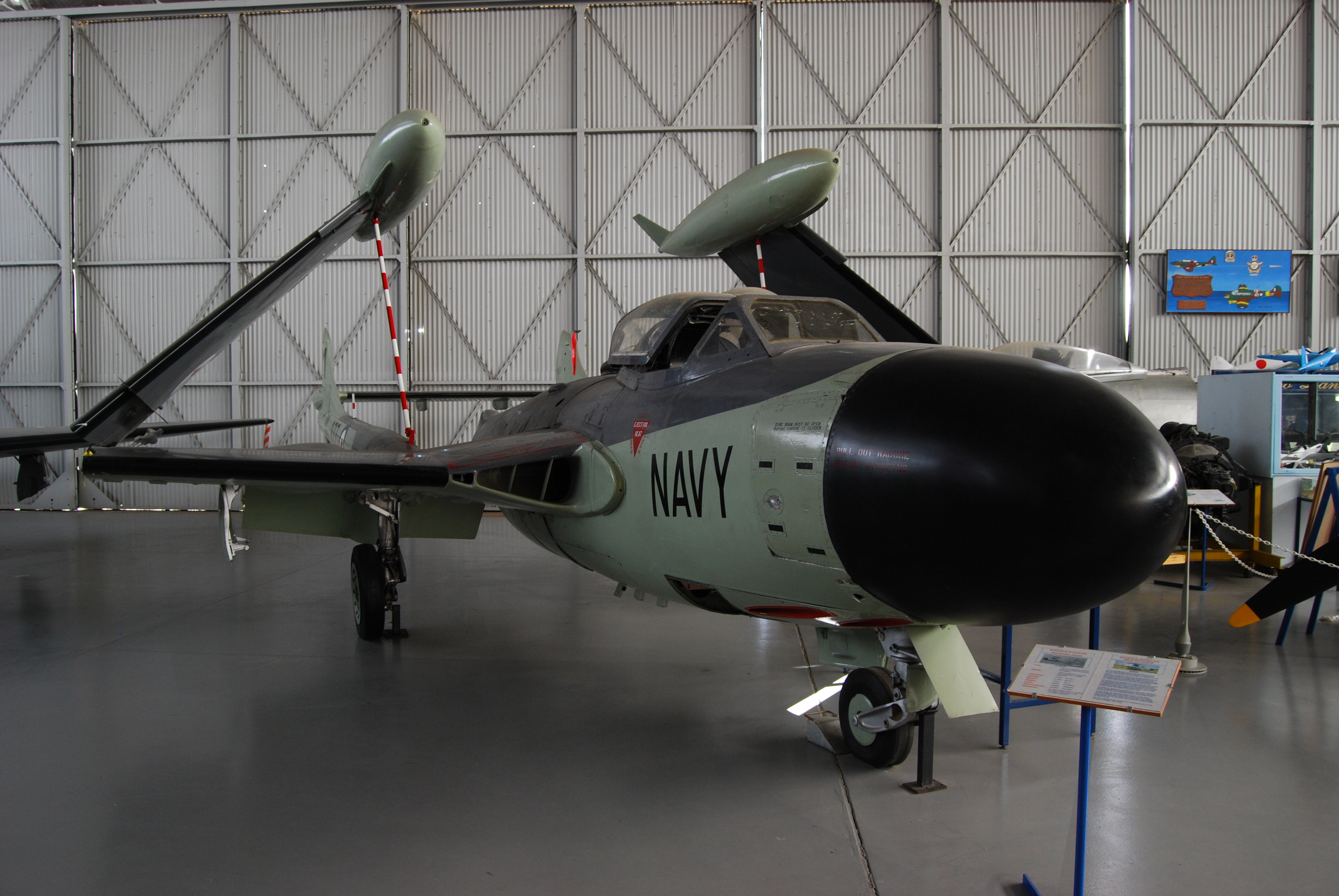
DH-22 de Havilland Sea Venom, formerly used aboard HMAS Melbourne

The South Australian Aviation Museum is the State's official aviation museum. It is run by an independent non-profit voluntary organisation that is accredited by the History Trust of South Australia. The museum was formed in 1984 at Glenelg and relocated in 1986 to a former Port Adelaide Flourmill. It relocated again in 1996, to an aircraft hangar also in Port Adelaide, and in January 2006 opened on its present site in Lipson Street, adjacent to the railway museum.

In 1991 the State Historical Aviation Collection became part of the museum. This collection was formerly held by the National Motor Museum in Birdwood. A collection of rockets from Woomera was received for display in 1996. Amongst the exhibits are a recently retired Lockheed AP-3C Orion, a General Dynamics F-111C and a GAF Mirage IIID, which was formerly the gate guard at RAAF Base Edinburgh. Older aircraft include a Spitfire Mark VC that was recovered after crashing in Papua New Guinea in 1943, a de Havilland Sea Venom and a Westland Wessex HAS.31B, formerly from the aircraft carrier HMAS Melbourne and a Douglas C-47B (Dakota) that was used for Government VIP transportation.

=== Austbuilt Maritime Museum ===
The Austbuilt Maritime Museum, operated by the Port Adelaide Historical Society, is located on Fletcher Road, Peterhead. It houses an extensive collection of maritime memorabilia accumulated by the late Keith Le Leu, who famously bought the steam tug Fearless for $1 in Brisbane in 1972 and steamed it to Adelaide. This vessel, currently owned by the South Australian Maritime Museum, remains on hardstand at Cruickshanks Corner near the Birkenhead Bridge, while its fate is still to be determined. During his lifetime, Keith Le Leu also donated other maritime artefacts for public display around Port Adelaide. These include two large anchors that sit outside the Birkenhead Tavern and another outside Le Fevre High School. The museum and these anchors form nodes along the Port Adelaide Anchor Trail, which was created in 2020.

=== Australian Museum of Childhood ===
The Australian Museum of Childhood displays a collection of toys that were manufactured in Australia from the 1890s onwards. The toys were collected by Alan Griffiths over a 30-year period.

== Transport and bridges ==
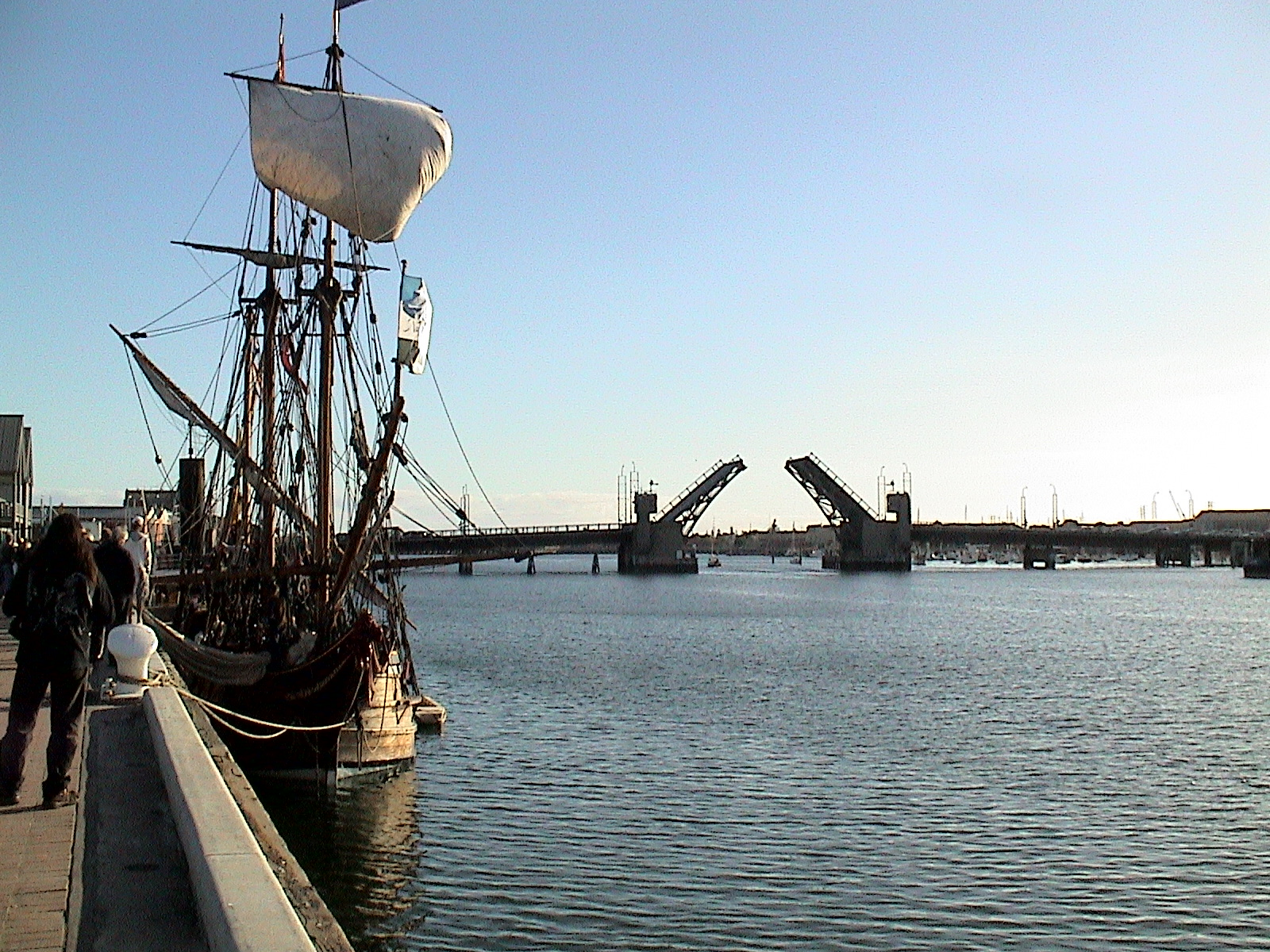
Replica 17th-century Dutch vessel Duyfken at Port Adelaide, with Birkenhead Bridge raised in May 2006

The first transport infrastructure in the suburb was the construction of a 1 mile (1.6 km) long road from the port to near the present Alberton Hotel. The road was opened in October 1840. The cost of this road, and the causeway upon which it ran proved so large that Governor Gawler allowed the constructing company to charge a toll. Later investigations showed the company was making excessive profits and a compromise was reached where the colony leased the roadway. Ownership of the roadway was later moved to the government, in exchange for land at Dry Creek.

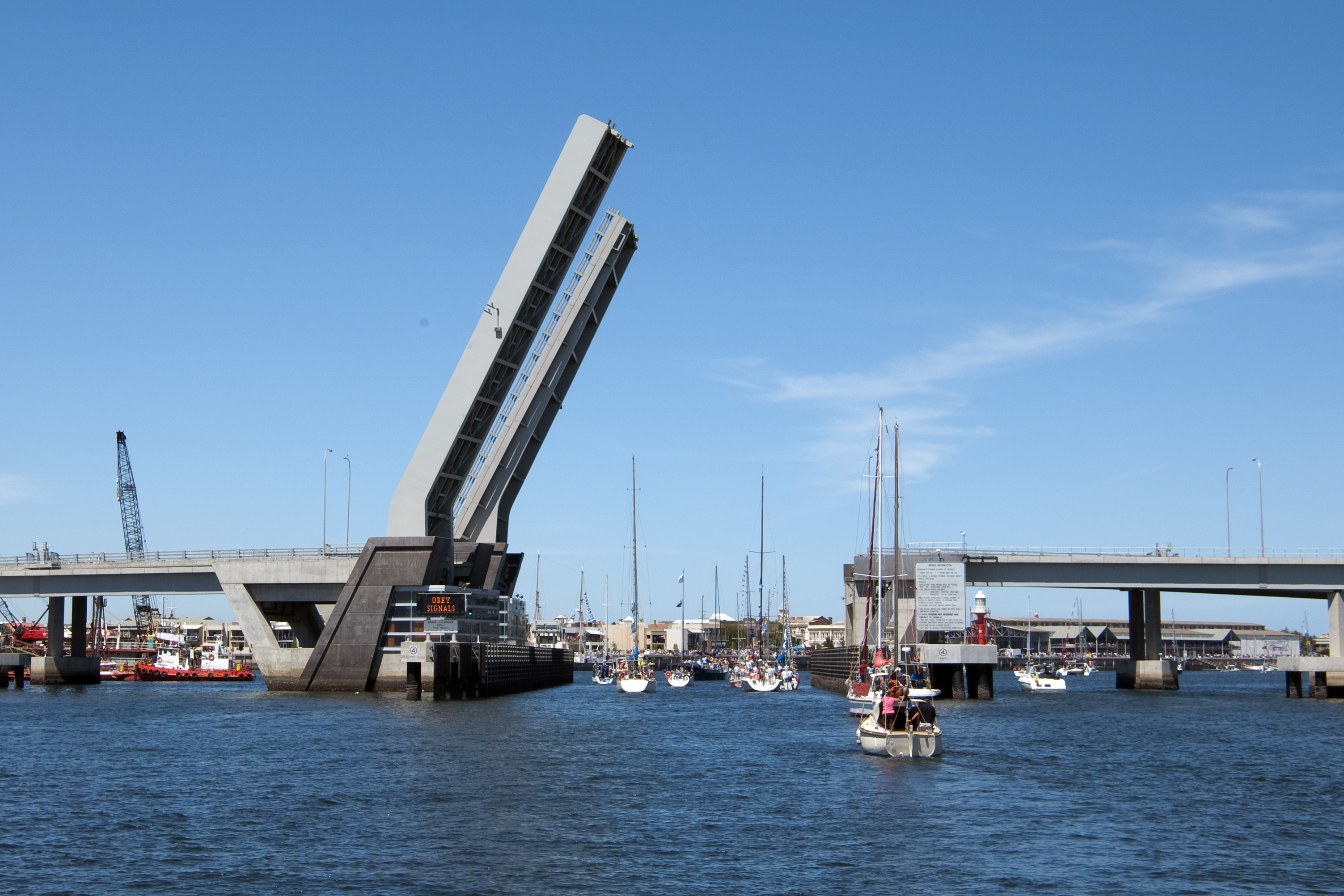
Diver Derrick bridge open in 2010 for the annual Flotilla for Kids fundraiser

The river was first crossed with a wooden bridge in the 1850s. This was replaced with the iron Jervois Bridge in 1878; It was named by Sir William Jervois after himself. Jervois Bridge was an opening bridge first operated by horse power, and later by mechanical means. It was replaced with a fixed bridge in the same position in 1969, when there was no longer a need for small boats to pass. Birkenhead Bridge, the first bascule bridge in Australia, opened in 1940. In 2004 Premier Mike Rann said the State government would build new rail and road bridges over the Port River at a cost of $178 million. On 3 April 2005 he announced that the 'opening and closing' bridges would be toll-free and would be opened twice a day to minimise disruptions to road traffic. It was opened for traffic on 3 August 2008. It is between Docks 1 and 2 at Port Adelaide and links with Francis Street to the east and Victoria Road to the west. A new railway through Port Adelaide was proposed in 2017, it started construction in June 2023 and reopened in August 2024.

Tom 'Diver' Derrick Bridge, commonly referred to as the 'Diver' Derrick Bridge, is an opening, single-leaf bascule bridge over the Port River. It was built at the same time as an adjacent rail crossing, the Mary MacKillop Bridge.

At the opening of both bridges Rann unveiled a plaque dedicated to Mary Mackillop blessed by Pope Benedict during his recent visit to Sydney.

The Port Adelaide and Le Fevre Peninsula Ferry Co began operations in 1877, ferrying passengers from the end of Commercial Road to the other side of the river. The ferry stopped operating in 1943, consequent to opening of the Birkenhead Bridge.

In April 1856 a rail line reached the port, crossing the almost empty plain from Adelaide. By 1876 it was a thriving seaport and the principal artery from South Australia, to the rest of the country and to the World. To service the numerous stores and warehouses, many railway lines were built around the wharf areas, along streets, and connecting with the main lines from Adelaide. A horse tram line was constructed from Port Adelaide to Albert Park in 1879. This line was built in 1,600 mm (5 ft 3 in) broad gauge to accommodate steam locomotives. Some of the line was raised on embankments to avoid swampy ground and flooding. The line used horse trams until 1914, when conversion to electric operation began. It reopened on 3 April 1917. From 1917 until its closure in 1935, the Port Adelaide tram system was not connected to the rest of Adelaide's light rail network.

Rail transport in the 21st century uses the Port Adelaide railway station which has two elevated platforms located on a viaduct, built in 1919. Trains connect to Adelaide and Outer Harbor. The line was closed in November 2009 to enable upgrade work on the line, station and viaduct. The line and station re-opened in 2010. Scheduled bus services directly connect Port Adelaide to much of metropolitan Adelaide. The Labor State Government promised that the Glenelg tram line would be extended down Port Road as far as Port Adelaide by 2018. However, during that year, the newly elected Liberal Party government scrapped the tram network expansion. In 2005 the road portion of the Port River Expressway was completed. It is a 5.5 kilometres (3.4 mi) freeway-grade road, which links Port Adelaide and the Lefevre Peninsula to the northern suburbs of Adelaide, and major interstate routes via Salisbury Highway.

== Famous Portonians ==
People who have lived around the Port Adelaide area include:

- A. V. Benson, of Port Adelaide Racing Club and Port Adelaide Football Club official
- George Bollen, homeopathic doctor
- Bryan Dawe actor, collaborator of John Clarke
- John Formby, shipping agent, mayor and Port Adelaide Football Club official
- John Hart, merchant, miller and State Premier
- James S. Hawkes, civil engineer
- Matthew Henry Hodge, pastor of the Congregational Church
- George Feltham Hopkins, mounted policeman and politician
- Alfred Le Messurier, shipping agent
- Thomas Lipson, harbour master and customs official
- Allen Martin, headmaster and inspector of schools
- William Mattinson, builder and politician
- Jack McCarthy, football coach
- Mortimer Menpes, painter
- John Menadue, public servant and diplomat (dubious inclusion)
- D. C. F. Moodie, editor of The Portonian
- Richard Francis Newland, banker and politician
- Bob Quinn, footballer
- William Quin, plasterer and politician
- Theophilus Robin, timber merchant
- A. T. Saunders, amateur historian
- William Scott, "Captain Scott", shipping agent and politician
- John Mitchell Sinclair, shipping agent and politician
- Jacob Smith, mayor and politician
- Fos Williams, footballer

== See also ==
- Naval Base Adelaide

== Bibliography ==
- Kingsborough, L.S. (1965). The horse tramways of Adelaide and its suburbs, 1875–1907. Adelaide: Libraries board of South Australia.
- Parsons, Ronald (1997). Port Misery and the new port. Lobethal, South Australia: Ronald Parsons. ISBN 0-909418-53-5.
- Parsons, Ronald (1986). Southern passages; A maritime history of South Australia. Netley, South Australia: Wakefield Press. ISBN 0-949268-66-6.
- Reynolds, Yvonne (2002). Pubs of Port Adelaide. Port Adelaide: Port Adelaide Historical Society Inc. ISBN 0-9595577-3-3.
- Sampson Bob, Offler Ingrid (June 2003). Your guide to the National Railway Museum (5th ed.). Port Adelaide: National Railway Museum.
- Samuels, Brian (1987). The Port Adelaide Centre: past and present. Port Adelaide: Port Centre Project Office. ISBN 0-7316-3009-2.
- State Transport Authority (1978). Transit in Adelaide: the story of the development of street public transportation in Adelaide from horse trams to the present bus and tram system. Adelaide: State Transport Authority. ISBN 0-7243-5299-6.
- Steele, Christopher (1981). The burnside lines. Sydney: Australian Electric Traction Association. ISBN 0-909459-08-8.
- The Critic (1909). The Tramways of Adelaide, past, present, and future: a complete illustrated and historical souvenir of the Adelaide tramways from the inception of the horse trams to the inauguration of the present magnificent electric trolley car system. Adelaide: The Critic.
