= Edmond Mazure =

South Australian vigneron

Leon Edmond Mazure (1861? 1864? – 29 April 1939), generally known as Edmond Mazure, was a French winemaker, known for his work in South Australia.

== History ==
Mazure was born in Villeneuve, France, later lived in Coulommiers, and studied winemaking in France and Spain. Around 1885 he began employment as a winemaker for Sydney Davenport at Beaumont, South Australia, and was naturalized that same year, later worked for Charles B. Young at Kanmantoo.

In 1888 he was taken on as partner by Sir Josiah Symon to oversee winemaking at Auldana, which he had just taken over from W. P. Auld. Auldana was exporting their St. Henri claret to London, but facing increasing competition from Italian wineries, so began production of sparkling wines, producing South Australia's first champagne in 1895. New cellars were tunneled from the solid rock under the hill, and by 1897 they had storage capacity for 300,000 imperial gallons (1,400 kl) of wine. He later founded the La Pérouse vineyards.

In 1915 he survived a collision when the car in which he was riding crashed into a train at a level crossing on the Willunga Road. The other two occupants were killed.

A son, Emile Edward Mazure, served with the 14/32nd Infantry of the AIF. He was caught selling wine illegally but was acquitted on a technicality – the way the law was drafted, the offence was selling quantities less than 5 imperial gallons (23 L) and the volume involved was somewhat greater.

In 1920 he retired to Victor Harbor, where he lived until shortly before his death.
