= Frank Henry Bartels =

Australian pen-and-ink artist and engraver

Frank Henry Bartels (18 February 1867 – 18 May 1895) was an Australian pen-and-ink artist and engraver.

== Early life and education ==
Frank Henry Bartels was born in Adelaide on 18 February 1867, the second son of Adolph Bartels, best known as mayor of Adelaide, and his second wife Anna Augusta Bartels.

He was educated at the school conducted by Adolph Leschen, and at Whinham College.

== Career ==
An architect by training, Bartels was apprenticed to the firm of Wright, Reed and Beaver, but finding no prospect of employment, he began working as a clerk. He received no formal art tuition.

Bartels established a studio at the family home in Hurtle Square, where public attention was drawn to his painstaking etchings and watercolours. Later that year he exhibited 22 pen-and-ink sketches at E. S. Wigg's stationery shop which were praised for their design and execution, comparing some with the work of Mortimer Menpes at the Art Gallery of South Australia.

In 1893 Bartels exhibited several pen-and-ink sketches with the Adelaide Easel Club that were admired, and later that year exhibited, at Fritz and Bernard's Art Palace, 62 Rundle Street, 92 views of South Australian scenery, including several watercolours.

In 1894 his painting The Eagle on the Hill was recommended as an addition to the colonial section of the Art Gallery of South Australia.

== Works ==
Bartels was much in demand for creating decorated addresses and certificates for presentation at official ceremonies, on account of the beauty and precision of his artwork, penmanship and illuminated lettering. Examples include:

- Presentation to Sir Isaac Pitman
- Prize certificates for the Literary Societies' Union and Chamber of Manufactures' Exhibition.
- Presentation to Dr R. T. Wylde of the Home for Incurables, Fullarton, on the eve of his return to England.
- His last work was an address to Alexander Johnston, Superintendent of Police at Broken Hill, New South Wales.

== Death ==
Bartels was caught up in the typhoid epidemic of 1895 and died at his home on Winchester Street, Malvern, on 18 May 1895. His funeral was well-attended. He was buried at West Terrace Cemetery.

== Family ==
Bartels married Elizabeth "Lizzie" Jeffery (Note: In 1907 Elizabeth Bartels and Edith M. Walmsley, founded "Quambi", a rest home and private hospital on Pennington Terrace, North Adelaide, in the building previously home of E. P. Nesbit's North Adelaide Educational Institution. The partnership was dissolved in 1907 and Bartels continued as principal. Her mother, Eliza Jeffery, née Berkeley, died there on 4 January 1914. In October 1919 "Quambi" relocated to 190 South Terrace and the Pennington Terrace premises had various tenants before becoming part of the Memorial Hospital. Bartels remained connected with the hospital as matron until 1942 and was contributing to patriotic causes in 1943 but no later history has been found.) on 17 June 1892. They had two daughters, both educated at Dryburgh House.

- Doris Eileen "Patsy" Bartels (20 June 1893–1982) married Ian Basil Pender on 7 December 1921. Pender was a medical doctor, later of Murrumbeena, Victoria.
- Pauline Berkeley "Pauli" Bartels (1894–1992) married Rudolph "Rudi" Bronner in England on 7 April 1917. They later had a daughter:

- Elizabeth Pauline Berkeley Bronner (1 March 1919–22 September 2003) married Donald Malcolm Reid in Sydney on 6 August 1940.
