= Allen Martin =

English sailor and educator in Australia

Allen Martin (12 August 1844 – 13 July 1924), sometimes misspelt Allan Martin, was an English sailor who founded a private school at Port Adelaide, in the colony of South Australia. He became the founding headmaster of Port Adelaide Central School, and was later an inspector of schools for the South Australian Department for Education.

== Early life and education ==
Allen Martin (sometimes misspelt Allan Martin in the local press) was born on 12 August 1844 in Bosham, West Sussex, the son of John Martin, a master mariner engaged in the coastal trade. Martin was educated at a local church school, then entered the upper grade (reserved for sons of master mariners and naval officers) of the Royal Naval College, Greenwich, where he trained as an instructor and achieved a teacher's certificate.

== Career ==
=== Sailor and labourer ===
Martin taught for a while, then joined the shipping firm Soames Brothers, trading to India and Australia, eventually becoming mate of the Dartmouth.

In 1867, after six or seven years at sea he quit the ship in Sydney, and joined the gold rush to Gympie, Queensland, followed by Kilkaven and Rockhampton. He had little luck and as mate of various vessels worked his way around the coast to Port MacDonnell, South Australia, where he worked as a labourer, loading bags of wheat for Adelaide, then worked his way to Adelaide aboard the government ship Flinders, arriving on 12 August 1869 at Port Adelaide.

There he tried to find work as a labourer, and found work at Reynolds timber yards. The story goes that he was rejected by both George Shorney (1829–1891), manager of Dunn's mill, and James T. Russell (1842–1929), manager of Hart's Mill. Three months later sons of these two men would be among his first pupils.

=== Port Adelaide Grammar School ===
Port Adelaide Grammar School was founded by the (Anglican) Rev. Frank Garrett (c. 1835 – 17 September 1885) in 1863, then in 1868 the school closed and the building on St. Vincent Street was advertised for sale. The Rev. Garrett left for England at the end of that year, suffering ill health.

Martin re-opened the school in January 1869 with seven pupils, reaching fifty at the end of the first year. It soon became necessary to hire a couple of pupil teachers: Charles Charlton (c. 1862 – 15 March 1931), later superintendent of primary schools, and Richard Llewellyn (c. 1860 – 6 January 1935), later headmaster of LeFevre Peninsula school. In 1876 the school building was purchased by the Council of Education, and Martin appointed headmaster.

Confusingly, another, quite different school of the same name (previously Classical and Mathematical School, Port Adelaide) was conducted concurrently (1871–1876) by James McLaughlin in Dale Street, Port Adelaide.

=== Port Adelaide Public School ===
The school was taken over by the Government in 1876, initially in the old building, and Mr. Martin continued with the school as headmaster until 1 January 1900, when he was appointed an Inspector of Schools. By then the school population had grown to 1,500 students and 22 teachers. Martin was remembered, without rancour, for his strong discipline.

Seeing a value in supplementing an academic education with technical training, he set up a carpentry and wood turning shop and a small printing press for the instruction of his pupils. He was somewhat ahead of his time, however (this was before the School of Mines), and met with opposition from both the trades unions and Minister of Education, later Judge, John Hannah Gordon, and was forced to close them.

=== Schools inspector ===
Martin was offered, and declined, promotions as headmaster of the prestigious schools at Grote Street, Sturt Street, and North Adelaide, but finally accepted the position of inspector, at a considerable increase in salary. He moved out of the Education Department house and purchased one more suited to his large family, on Military Road, Semaphore.

== Later life and death ==
He retired on 21 December 1915, over the statutory retirement age. He was then able to assist two of his sons, who were in business on St. Vincent Street, Port Adelaide, as Harold Martin & Co., electricians and motor mechanics.

Martin died on 13 July 1924 at his residence on Military Road, Semaphore.

== Other interests ==
Martin's chief interest was yacht racing. He was a member of the Royal Yacht Squadron, and later served as Rear-Commodore. His "pride and joy" was the sailer Miranda, built for him in 1890 by John Fraser (c. 1866–1896), of Birkenhead, and the boys could always tell on Monday morning how well the racing went. If successful he would joke and overlook minor transgressions; if otherwise, look out! Mr. Martin was handy with the cane.

He played (Australian Rules) football with the Old Woodville Football Club in the days when the Old Adelaide Football Club was the only other club. He helped found the Alberton Oval, from 1880 the home of the Port Adelaide Football Club.

He joined the South Australian Militia as a private, but quickly worked his way up the ranks, and was appointed captain of the largest company then existing, the "L" Company of Adelaide Volunteers.

== Recognition ==
- A. T. Saunders, an amateur historian with roots in the Port, referred to "Martin's Academy" as a "great school".
- The Allen Martin Garden was established in the school grounds in 1924 in his memory.

== Some of his students ==
- W. R. Bayly, headmaster of Prince Alfred College
- J. R. Robertson head of Prince Alfred College preparatory school and prominent Freemason
- Sir Roy Lister Robinson (1883–1952) won a scholarship to St Peter's College and was SA's second Rhodes Scholar
- Professor Herbert William Gartrell (1882–1945) won a scholarship to St Peter's College and later an Angas Scholarship
- William John "Willie" Walker (1869–1901), secured the last South Australian Scholarship in 1886
- David Bews (1850–1891), Minister of Education
- Medicos Chris Bollen, Percy Bollen, John Gething, H. Russell, Hains, F. Butler were well-known medical men
- Malcolm Reid, businessman of the furniture emporium in Hindley Street
- Edward Allan Farquhar (1871–1935), chairman of the Harbors Board
