= Flinders Street =

Flinders Street, named after explorer Matthew Flinders, may refer to:

- Flinders Street, Adelaide
- Flinders Street, Melbourne
- Flinders Street, Townsville
- Flinders Street railway station, in Melbourne
- Flinders Street Viaduct, a railway bridge in Melbourne

== See also ==
- Flinders (disambiguation)
