= Victorian Ice Hockey Association =

Governing body of ice hockey in Victoria, Australia

- Sport: Ice hockey
- Jurisdiction: Victoria
- Abbreviation: IHV
- Founded: 12 September 1908
- Affiliation: Ice Hockey Australia
- President: Jayme Law
- Secretary: Cathrin Willaert

Official website
- www.ihv.org.au
- (Australia)
- (Victoria (state))

The Victorian Ice Hockey Association, currently trading as Ice Hockey Victoria (IHV) is the governing body of ice hockey in Victoria, Australia. The Victorian Ice Hockey Association is a branch of Ice Hockey Australia. IHV's flagship league is its Premier League which has been contested since 1909.

== History ==
Ice Hockey Victoria is the first ice hockey association formed in Australia. 12 September 1908 is the date of the formation of the first ice hockey association in Australia. The meeting at the Melbourne Glaciarium occurred directly after an evening ice hockey game between the Brighton Ice Hockey Club and the Melburnians, which resulted in a 2–2 tie. The meeting was for the purpose of organising a club for the following season and the following committee was appointed: Lorimer, Ward, Errol Forster Woods, Walter Purbrick and Andrew Lambert Reid. Mr. Purbrick was nominated as honourable Treasurer and Mr. Reid was nominated as the Secretary.

The name of the association was the Victorian Amateur Ice Hockey Association (VAIHA). The association consisted of 4 ice hockey clubs:

- Beavers
- Brighton
- Glaciarium
- Melburnians

The Glaciarium Ice Hockey Club was formed in 1907 and was the first ice hockey club to form in Australia and they are named for the Melbourne Glaciarium as the in house representative team. The remainder of the original 3 teams were formed in 1908. The Melburnians Ice Hockey Club consisted of the Melbourne Grammar School field hockey team and the team was named the Melburnians after the school. The Brighton Ice Hockey Club team were also named after a school, Brighton Grammar School. The Beavers Ice Hockey Club were named after their sponsor, Melbourne architect, Isidor George Beaver. The games were played in two 10-minute halves.

=== The School Club era ===
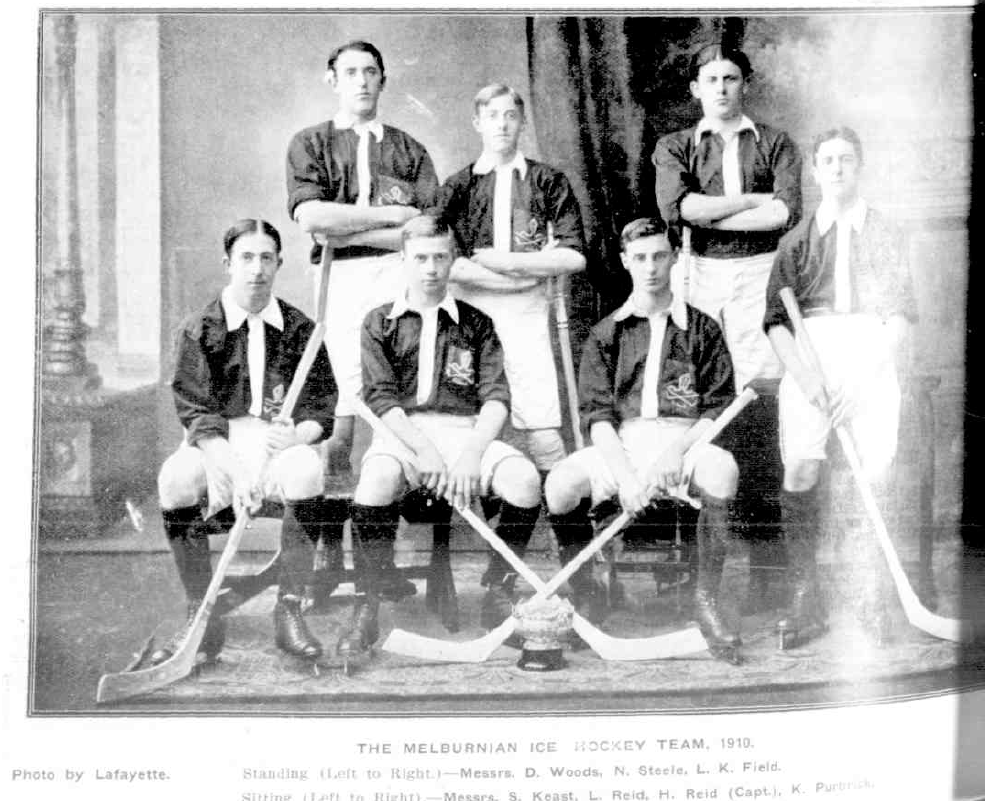
Melburnians IHC 1910 – Champions

The inaugural Victorian Amateur Ice Hockey Association season began with the first game being played at the Melbourne Glaciarium on the evening of 19 June 1909 between Brighton Ice Hockey Club and the Glaciarium Ice Hockey Club. The Glaciarium Ice Hockey Club would finish the regular season in first place and would be given the title of the minor premiers. The playoff format would then see the semi-finals have the first place Glaciarium Ice Hockey Club play the second place Melburnian Ice Hockey Club, who upset the minor premiers 3–1. The 3rd place Beavers Ice Hockey Club would be beaten by the 4th place Brighton Ice Hockey Club with a score of 5–3 and see the playoff championship be held between the Melburnian Ice Hockey Club and Brighton Ice Hockey Club. The Melburnian Ice Hockey Club would win convincingly 7–1. Due to finishing first during the regular season, which meant they were the 1909 season minor premiers, the Glaciarium Ice Hockey Club was able to issue a challenge to the Melburnian Ice Hockey Club for the Grand Challenge Championship. This championship was held on the evening of 27 September 1909 and the Glaciarium Ice Hockey Club won by a score of 3–0 and were awarded gold medals.

For the 2nd season, the association ran under the auspices Victorian Amateur Ice Hockey and Sports Association and from the local competition, players would be selected to represent Victoria in the annual Inter-State Series. The first game of the season began at 9:00 pm at the Melbourne Glaciarium on 22 June 1910 between Beavers Ice Hockey Club and Brighton Ice Hockey Club resulting in a 5–3 win for Brighton. The playoff champions were the Melburnian Ice Hockey Club, who are seen posed with a trophy cup.

In 1911 the Melbourne Glaciarium was leased from 30 September that year, cutting the season shorter than usual, embracing 4 Ice Hockey clubs again. An ice hockey team was formed for girls and matches would begin for them every Saturday after the afternoon public skating session.

The 1912 season saw the addition of the Ottawa Ice Hockey Club in the absence of the Glaciarium Ice Hockey Club in the competition. Due to the season being short, it was necessary to play two games per night. The association would also now go by the name Victorian Ice Hockey Association. The Association would continue for another 2 years until the Great War.

=== The Great War ===
As the Great War began, plans for the abandonment of ice hockey until the end of the war were considered. The rink management would go on to organise speed contests in the absence of a hockey season. No cup was to be contested in the 1915 season

In 1916, though the season was again cancelled, the Victorian Ice Hockey Association were considering younger players to fill the void left by many players at war. There was no certainty that ice hockey would be played.

Competition would resume in 1917 with a 2-team league consisting of the Beavers Ice Hockey Club and Ottawa Ice Hockey Club. The Melbourne Glaciarium management presented a trophy for the shortened competition. The premiership trophy was to be presented by Melbourne Glaciarium manager, Percy Watson, at the annual dinner. The Dinner was held at the Francatelli Cafe at 7:00 pm on 14 September 1917. The Dinner was held at the Magpie Tea Rooms, Collins Street where the premiership cup was presented to Beaver Club captain Roy Marks.

Hockey players began to practice upon the opening of the ice skating season. A match was held between a Blues and Whites team during a carnival on 27 July 1918.

In 1920, the Melbourne Glaciarium did not operate an ice floor due to the popularity of dancing and was converted into a Palais de Dance. This meant that no ice hockey was played in Victoria, nor any ice sport played for this year.

=== Post Great War era ===
A cup was donated by John Edwin Goodall in 1921, not to be confused with the Goodall Cup used for the inter-state competition, this Goodall Cup was used as the premiership trophy for the Victorian Ice Hockey Association's ice hockey league.

As the ice hockey season opened for 1924, 5 men's ice hockey teams were formed and 1 women's team.

=== The Suburb Club era ===
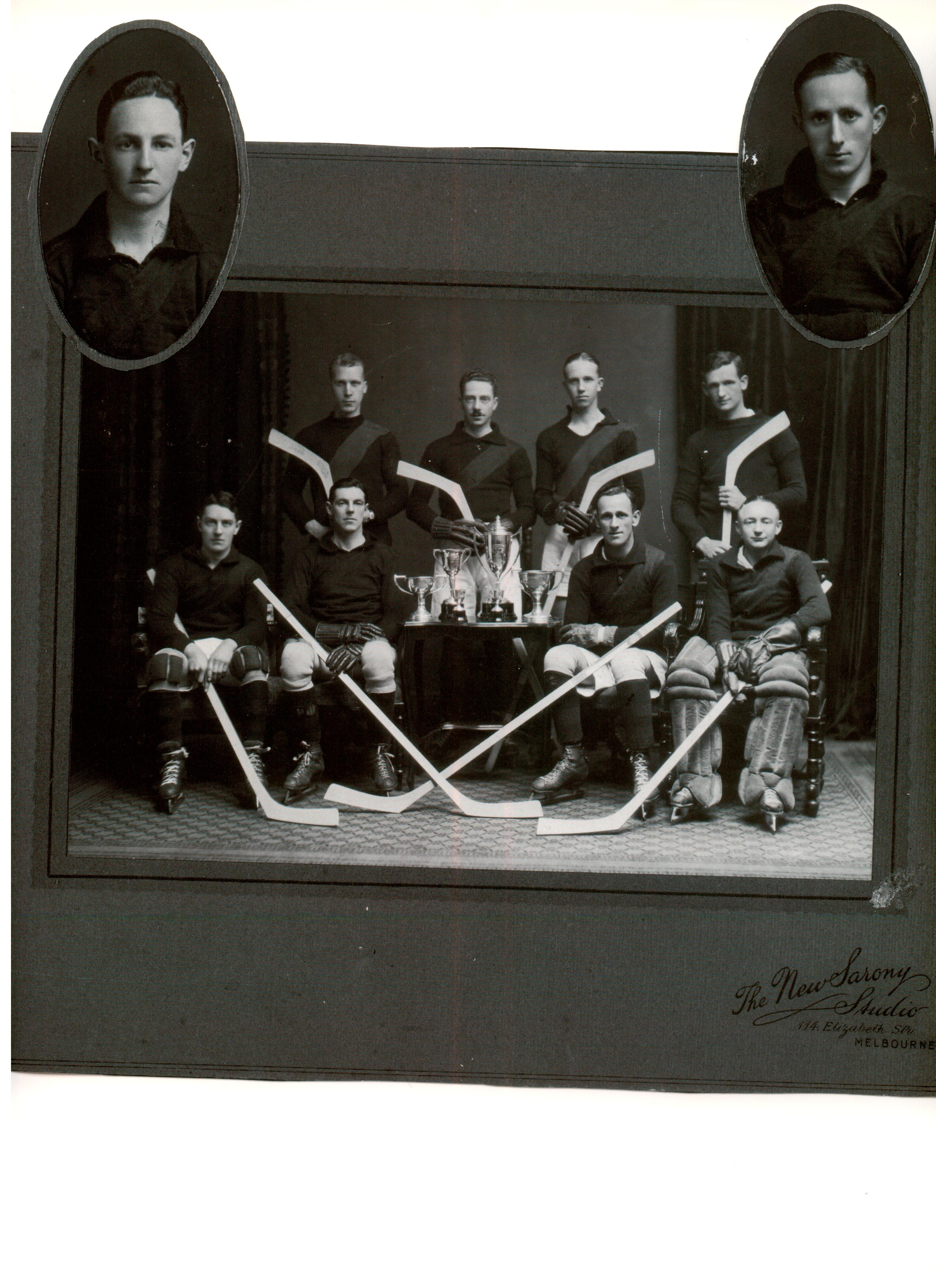
1927 Essendon Ice Hockey Club

In the year Essendon won its first Premiership, earning the right to hold the Goodall Cup, they also held the first Presidents Cup donated by the Victorian Ice Hockey Association president Mr. P Sutherland.

=== Inter Rink Club era ===
With the opening of the St. Moritz Ice Palais on 10 March 1939, a new strategy was to be made to allow the competition to make use of now having a second rink. This decision resulted in the disbanding of the current ice hockey teams and the formation of an ice hockey club at each rink, who would submit teams into the Victorian Ice Hockey Association season competition. On 19 April 1939, the Victorian Ice Hockey Association held a meeting to spread the competition across a second rink, with the St. Moritz Ice Palais officially opening a month before. The result of the meeting was that the Association decided that two new ice hockey clubs would be formed, one for the Melbourne Glaciarium and the other for the new St. Moritz Ice Palais, both clubs would seek affiliation with the VIHA. Between the two new ice hockey clubs they would provide four teams for the new 1939 VIHA season which would involve an inter-rink competition played between the Melbourne Glaciarium and St. Moritz Ice Palais. The St. Moritz Ice Hockey Club teams would be named the St. Moritz Bombers and the Smokey Bombers. The 3 existing VIHA teams would disband and join the new ice hockey clubs. Those teams were Essendon, Hawthorn and Brighton. The 2 new ice hockey clubs would be named the St. Moritz Bombers Ice Hockey Club and the Glaciarium Rangers Ice Hockey Club and they were coached by Mr. Fred Palmer and Mr. Hugh Lloyd. Instead of both clubs producing 2 teams for inter-rink competition as originally planned, they each submitted only 1 team into the competition. The teams to compete would be the St. Moritz Bombers and the Glaciarium Rangers.

The St. Moritz Ice Hockey Club would create its own inter-club "house league" season at St. Moritz Ice Palais by dividing into 2 teams that only played against each other . These teams were the St. Moritz Bombers and Foy's Gibsonia Flyers, who were sponsored by Foy & Gibson.

The ice hockey season was scheduled to begin on 7 May 1940 with the first game of the St. Moritz Ice Hockey Club inter-club matches. Mr. Wallace Sharland was elected president of the Victorian Ice Hockey Association. On 29 April 1940 a meeting was held at Melbourne University and it was decided that they would form an Ice Hockey Club in hopes that inter-varsity games could be arranged with the Sydney University ice hockey club. The prospective ice hockey players would be coached by members of the Victorian Ice Hockey Association. The St. Moritz Bombers Ice Hockey Club created a new team called Rhodes' Topliners, who were sponsored by Rhodes Motor Company PTY LTD. They were to compete against the other sponsored team, Foy's Gibsonia Flyers, for their inter-club competition. A trophy was donated to the St. Moritz Ice Hockey Club inter-club season by Mr. O.T. Dixon

=== World War II ===
Initial reports stated that ice hockey would be discontinued for the entirety of the 1941 season due to the activity of World War II but the Victorian Ice Hockey Association decided to continue the inter-rink competition. Enlistments had reduced the numbers for senior players but the focus on improving the standard of junior players would be relied upon to raise the senior competition standard. Each rink was still represented by an ice hockey club with the St. Moritz Bombers Ice Hockey Club at St. Moritz Ice Palais and the Glaciarium Rangers Ice Hockey Club operating in the Melbourne Glaciarium. The combined membership between both clubs exceeded 100 players but key players would be subject to compulsory participation in World War II and enlistments. One such key player was Canadian Hugh Lloyd who became a member of the R.A.A.F. leaving a vacancy in the coaching role at the Glaciarium that veteran ice hockey player Alfred Massina would need to fill.

Due to incidents that occurred in the inter-rink game between the St. Moritz Bombers and Glaciarium Rangers where fighting occurred between players which included involvement with spectators and 3 players being ordered off the ice, an ongoing ban continued to be in place against these 3 St. Moritz Bombers players from playing in the Melbourne Glaciarium. Before the season would start, the St. Moritz Bombers Ice Hockey Club held a meeting on 25 May 1941 and decided that if the Melbourne Glaciarium management refused to lift the ban on these 3 players, the St. Moritz Bombers would not submit a team to compete against the Glaciarium Rangers in the inter-rink competition this year. Meanwhile, the Glaciarium Rangers Ice Hockey Club had decided to create their own house league and formed 4 new teams that would play exclusively at the Melbourne Glaciarium. These teams were: Collingwood, Hawthorn, South Melbourne and Essendon.

The events of World War II would result in the Victorian Ice Hockey Association ceasing operations, with the last meeting being held in the Melbourne Glaciarium 29 May 1941 with the managers of each ice rink to discuss the future plans for the inter-rink competition, while each rinks hockey club continued independently with their own house league season at their respective home rink. It was later confirmed just before the season that there would be no inter-rink competition for the 1941 season.

On 13 July 1941 A campaign was started to make ice hockey a popular sport in post war years, inviting juveniles between the ages of 12–14 to put on skates and receive coaching from senior members of the St. Moritz Bombers Ice Hockey Club. Over 30 young people attended.

=== Post World War II and Modern Hockey ===
After ceasing activity as an association during the events of World War II in 1941, the first post-war meeting was held in St. Moritz Ice Rink at 8:15pm on 6 May 1946. The meeting was attended by 45 members and prospective members and the first order of business was to elect a chairperson and Secretary for the meeting to dissolve the previous committee and elect a new one. Ted Molony, Manager of the Melbourne Glaciarium was elected president but resigned in the following meeting 10 days later to be replaced by Syd Hiort. It was on this same day in the second meeting on the evening of 16 May 1946 that the Association would form 4 new clubs and plan the 1946 Season and new player permit cards, the first season for a few years. The 4 new clubs were Eastern Suburbs, Western Suburbs, Southern Suburbs and Northern Suburbs.

== Interstate competition ==
=== 1909: The Inter-State Series ===
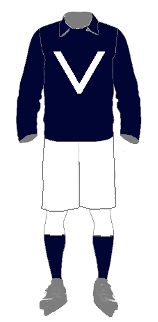
The first ice hockey uniform for Victoria 1909

The first ice hockey team representing Victoria 1909

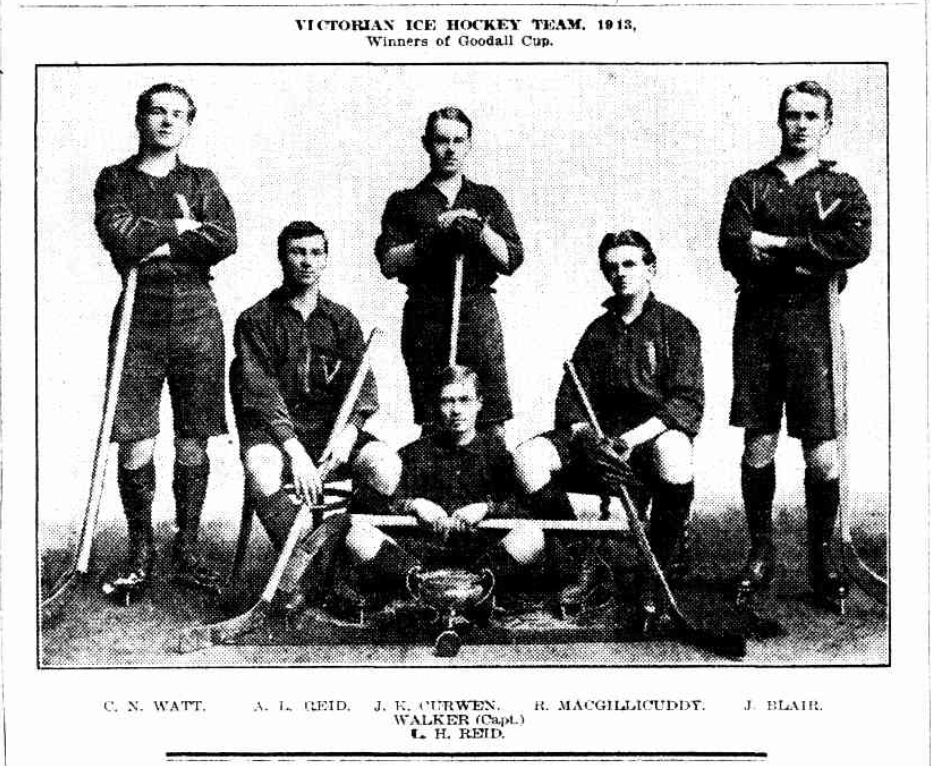
Victoria – Goodall Cup Champions 1913

The first inter-state ice hockey championship was held between a state representative team from Victoria and from New South Wales. This tournament was a best-of-3 format and saw Victoria win the series 2 games to 1. New South Wales was represented by a newly formed team in 1909 and travelled to Melbourne on 29 August 1909 which marked the first national interstate competition for senior men's hockey in Australia.

The first game of the series had a final score of 2–1 with New South Wales defeating Victoria. Friday 3 September 1909 the Victorian team defeated the New South Wales team 1–0, giving Victorian goaltender Charles Watt the first recorded shutout in the history of the Inter-State Series. In the third game of the series both teams had won a game each. Victoria defeated New South Wales 6–1 and became the first team to win the Inter-State Series in Australia.

The proprietors of the St. Moritz Ice Rink granted ice time to the Victorian Ice Hockey Association, free of charge to run a Lightning premiership for 8 B grade teams on 9 July 1954. All proceeds for the matches would go to the hockey association for the betterment and growth of the sport in Victoria.

=== 1922: The Gower Cup ===
The first inter-state women's ice hockey championship tournament was held in the first week in August 1922 between New South Wales and Victoria, New South Wales won the first game of the series 3–0.

== Leagues ==
For the 2019 Season, Ice Hockey Victoria established 4 leagues:

=== Senior Ice Hockey ===
The primary competition for Ice Hockey Victoria takes place in the Winter Season.

- Premier League – The top hockey league and only checking hockey league in Victoria. (6 teams)
- Senior B – The 1st tier of senior non-checking hockey, which has no gender restriction for eligibility. (7 teams)
- Senior C – The 2nd tier of senior non-checking hockey, which has no gender restriction for eligibility. (7 teams)
- Senior D – The 3rd tier of senior non-checking hockey, which has no gender restriction for eligibility. (7 teams)

=== Minor Ice Hockey ===
The 2019 Minor Hockey League consists of 3 age levels:

- 11-Under (4 teams)
- 13-Under (4 teams)
- 15-Under (4 teams)
- 17-Under (3 teams)

=== Women's Ice Hockey ===
Established independently and operating out of the Olympic Ice Skating Centre the Ice Hockey Victoria Women's League IHVWL now operates under Ice Hockey Victoria sanction.

=== Summer Ice Hockey ===
- Recreational C Division I
- Recreational C Division II
- Recreational C Division III
- Recreational C Division IV

== Trophies and Awards ==
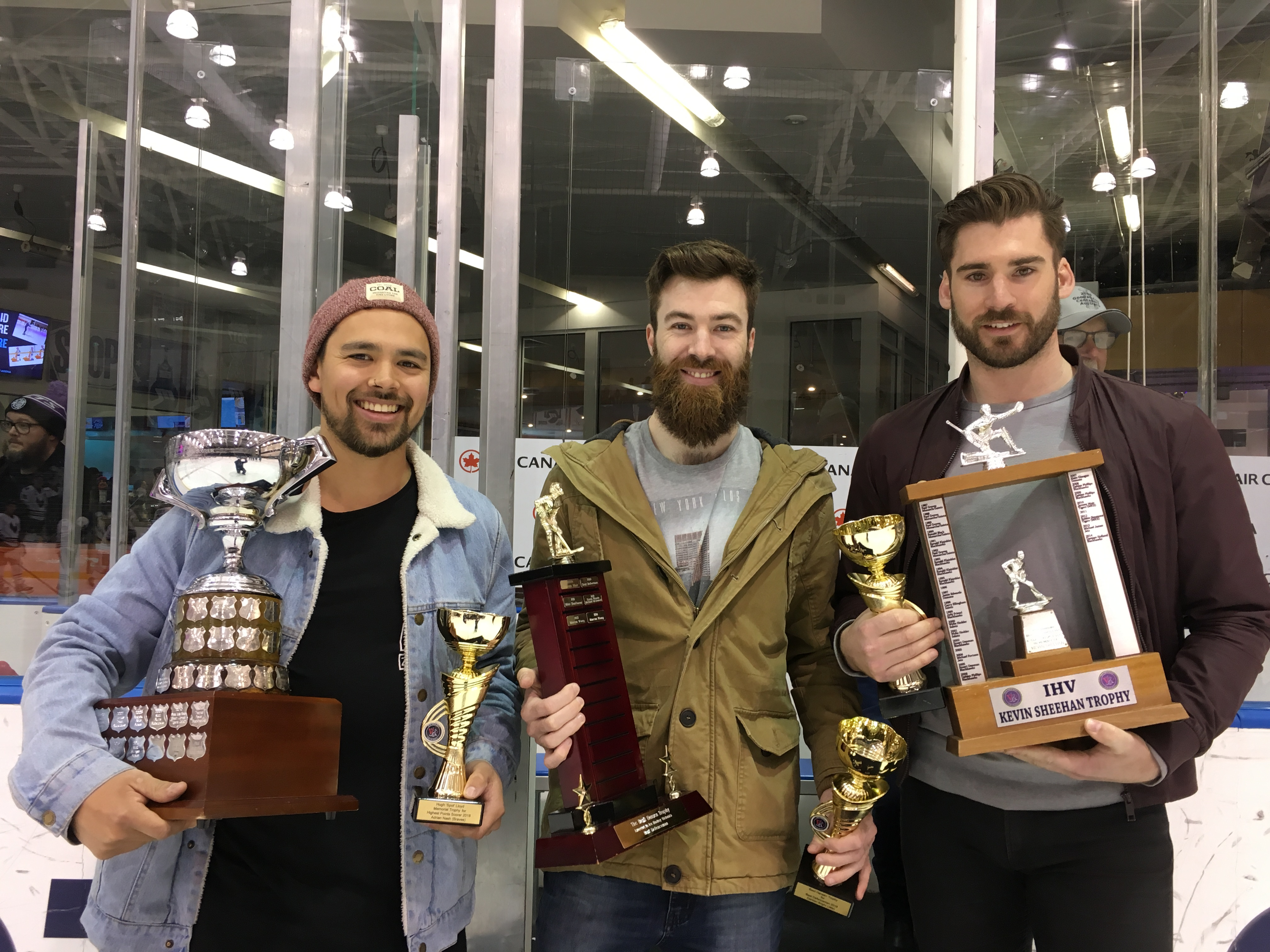
2018 Premier A individual Award Winners

Ice Hockey Victoria continues to present the original perpetual trophies for team and individual accomplishment for the season, the oldest award still presented today is the H.H. Kleiner Trophy which was first presented in 1946. Each level of hockey has its own playoff trophy as well as 4 individual trophies for: Season MVP, Highest Goal Scorer, Best Defenceman and Best Goaltender. In each case for individual awards, the original trophy is presented to the winner as well as a keeper trophy that they can take with them.

=== H. H. Kleiner Memorial Trophy ===
H.H. Kleiner Trophy

The H.H. Kleiner Memorial Trophy is a perpetual trophy awarded to the playoff champions of the Premier A level winter season competition for Ice Hockey Victoria. Since being awarded to the Western Suburbs in 1946 for its inaugural year, the trophy has always been awarded to the highest level of competition in Victoria, Australia. The trophy's namesake is Harry Hans Kleiner, the original proprietor of the St. Moritz Ice Palais. The H. H. Kleiner remains as the oldest Victorian state level competition trophy that is still contested and the original trophy is still being awarded and presented to the playoff champion of Victoria's highest level of state ice hockey to this day.

==== History ====
World War II would result in the ceasing of regular ice hockey league activity in Victoria for a few years, many players had enlisted and lost their lives while serving their country. Leading up to the war time activity, enlistments had reduced the numbers for Victorian senior ice hockey players but the focus on improving the standard of junior players would be relied upon to raise the senior competition standard. Before the war each rink was still represented by an ice hockey club with the St. Moritz Bombers Ice Hockey Club at St. Moritz Ice Palais and the Glaciarium Rangers Ice Hockey Club operating in the Melbourne Glaciarium. The combined membership between both clubs exceeded 100 players but key players would be subject to compulsory participation in World War II and enlistments. One such key player was Canadian Hugh Lloyd who became a member of the R.A.A.F. leaving a vacancy in the coaching role at the Melbourne Glaciarium that veteran ice hockey player Alfred Massina would need to fill. The Victorian Ice Hockey Association held a meeting on 29 May 1941 with the managers of each ice rink to discuss the future plans for the inter-rink competition, while each rinks hockey club continued independently with their own house league season at their respective home rink. It was later confirmed just before the season that there would be no inter-rink competition for the 1941 season. On 13 July 1941 A campaign was started to make ice hockey a popular sport in post war years, inviting juveniles between the ages of 12–14 to put on skates and receive coaching from senior members of the St. Moritz Bombers Ice Hockey Club. Over 30 young people attended. From scrimmage sessions being held during the wartime activity, enough players would be available to form a league by 1946 consisting of 4 teams: Northern Suburbs, Southern Suburbs, Eastern Suburbs and Western Suburbs. This would be the first time in a few years that a league would exist but as the Melbourne Glaciarium did not operate an ice floor in 1946 due to the popularity of dancing, the 1946 competition would only operate inside Harry Hans Kleiner's St. Moritz Ice Palais and the modern era of club ice hockey would begin. Harry Hans Kleiner donated the trophy we know today as the H.H. Kleiner Trophy to the first champions, the Western Suburbs.

==== Traditions and trophy history ====
Due to an alleged miscommunication between Ice Hockey Victoria executive in 2016 the Jets Ice Hockey Club won the playoff championship in two games, securing the H.H. Kleiner Trophy, but it was not brought to the venue by members of the Association, making this the first time in its history that the winning team was not presented the trophy after winning it.

For the 2018 IHV Winter season, the H.H. Kleiner trophy was refurbished, fixing the trophy that had become more fragile with time. Part of the work that was undertaken included a lengthening of the central brass cylinder to allow more champions to be inscribed on the award.

=== Basil Hansen Memorial Trophy ===
The Basil Hansen Memorial Trophy is currently awarded to the playoff champions in the Premier Reserve league. The trophy namesake is Basil Hansen, an Australian ice hockey champion.

=== Don Reddish Trophy ===
The Don Reddish trophy is currently awarded to the playoff champions in the Premier C division I

=== Clive Connelly Trophy ===
The Clive Connelly Trophy is currently awarded to the playoff champions in the Premier C division II

== Uniform and Logos ==
Past Uniforms for Victoria State Ice Hockey Team
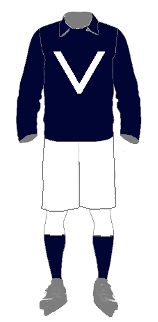
1909 – The first team

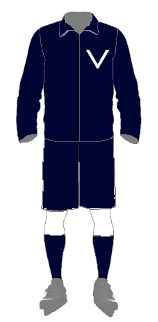
1913

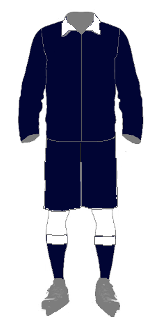
1921

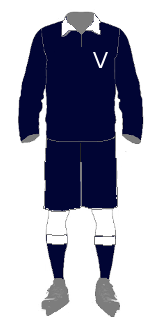
1922

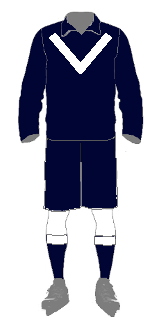
1928
Representations based on photographs and written descriptions.

== Presidents ==
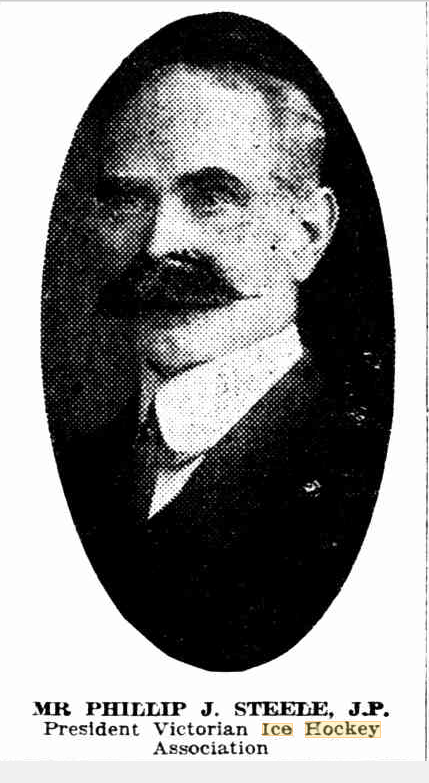
29 July 1914 second president of the Victorian Ice Hockey Association. National Library of Australia

- 1911 – Phillip John Rupert Steele Sr.
- 1912 – Phillip John Rupert Steele Sr.
- 1913 – Phillip John Rupert Steele Sr.
- 1914 – Phillip John Rupert Steele Sr.
- 1925 – P. Sutherland
- 1926 – P. Sutherland
- 1927 – P. Sutherland
- 1930 – John Edwin Goodall
- 1936 – A. de Long
- 1937 – A. de Long
- 1938 – A. de Long
- 1939 – E. J. Moloney
- 1940 – Wallace Sharland
- 1946 – Sydney Norman Hiort
- 1947 – Sydney Norman Hiort
- 1948 – Sydney Norman Hiort
- 1949 – Sydney Norman Hiort
- 1950 – Sydney Norman Hiort
- 1951 – Sydney Norman Hiort
- 1952 – Sydney Norman Hiort
- 1953 – Dr. Sándor Miklós
- 1960 – Kurt DeFris
- 1961 – Kurt DeFris
- 1962 – Kurt DeFris
- 1963 – Kurt DeFris
- 1964 – Kurt DeFris
- 1965 – Kurt DeFris
- 1966 – Kurt DeFris
- 1967 – Kurt DeFris
- 1968 – Kurt DeFris
- 1969 – Kurt DeFris
- 1970 – Kurt DeFris
- 1971 – Kurt DeFris
- 1972 – Kurt DeFris
- 1973 – Kurt DeFris
- 1974 – Kurt DeFris
- 1975 – Kurt DeFris
- 1976 – Kurt DeFris
- 1977 – Kurt DeFris
- 1978 – Kurt DeFris
- 1979 – Charlie Grandy
- 1980 – Charlie Grandy
- 1985 – Robert Blackburn
- 1986 – Robert Blackburn
- 1987 – Maxwell J. McKowen
- 1990 – Charlie Grandy
- 1996 – Alan Adamson
- 1997 – Doug R. Monahan
- 1999 – Rod Johns
- 2000 – Rod Johns
- 2001 – Rod Johns
- 2002 – Rod Johns
- 2007 – Andrew McDowell
- 2008 – Andrew McDowell
- 2009 – Andrew McDowell
- 2013 – Travis Alabaster
- 2014 – Travis Alabaster
- 2016 – Warren Porter
- 2018 – Maureen Black
- 2019 – Maureen Black
- 2020 - Maureen Black
- 2021 - Maureen Black
- 2022 - Maureen Black
- 2023 - Veronica Ryan
- 2024 - Veronica Ryan
- 2025 - Jayme Law

== See also ==
- Ice Hockey Australia
- Australian Women's Ice Hockey League
- Australian Junior Ice Hockey League
