= Flinders Ranges (disambiguation) =

The Flinders Ranges are a mountain range in the state of South Australia.

Flinders Ranges may refer to one of these places in the state:

- Flinders Ranges, South Australia, a locality
- Flinders Ranges Council, a local government area
- Flinders Ranges Way, a road
- Ikara–Flinders Ranges National Park, a protected area
- Wapma Thura–Southern Flinders Ranges National Park, a protected area, proclaimed 2021

== See also ==
- Flinders (disambiguation)
- Nilpena Ediacara National Park, another national park in the northern Flinders Ranges
