= Mount Breckan =

Grand residence in Victor Harbor, Australia

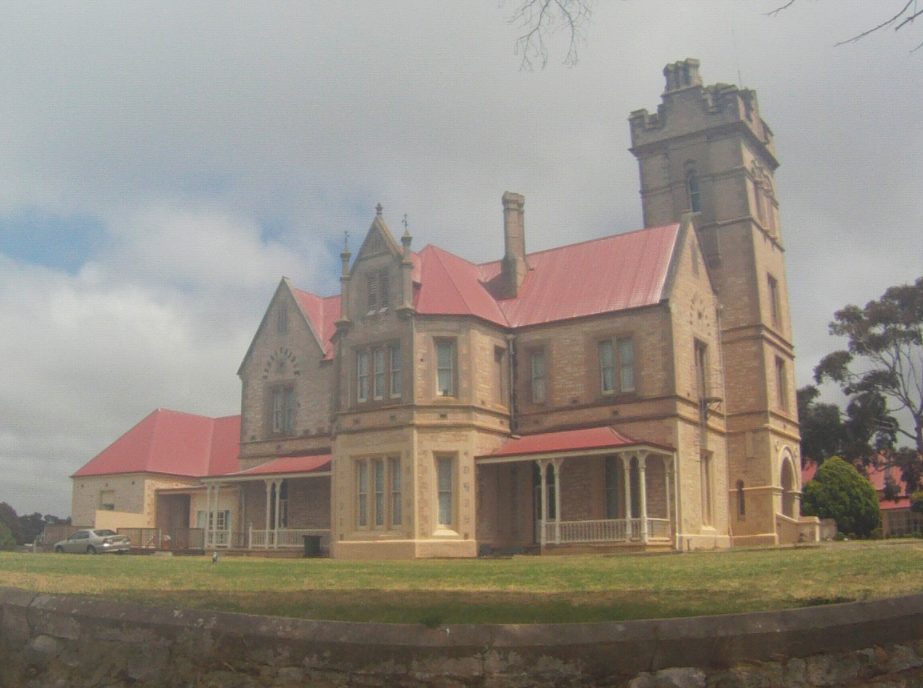
- Mt Breckan from the east
- Interactive map of the Mount Breckan area

General information
- Location: Renown Avenue, Victor Harbor, Australia
- Coordinates: 35°32′47″S 138°37′18″E
- Construction started: April 1879
- Completed: 1881
- Renovated: 1913
- Cost: £25,000
- Client: Alexander Hay

Technical details
- Floor area: 19,000 square feet (1,800 m^{2})

Design and construction
- Architect: William McMinn

Mount Breckan is a grand 38-room residence, originally located on 160 acres (65 ha) in the south-coast town of Victor Harbor, South Australia. It was designed by William McMinn in a Gothic Revival style, and completed in 1881.

The house was one of the largest residences in Australia at that time, with a floor area of 19,000 square feet (1,800 m^{2}), sixty rooms, two cellars and a five-storey tower. It was commissioned by Alexander Hay, a prominent politician, farmer, and wealthy Rundle Street merchant, and cost £25,000 to build. It was originally used as a summer retreat. Hay died in 1898. In 1908 the house was destroyed by fire; due to inadequate insurance coverage, the Hay family did not rebuild the ruin. The following year Hay's widow and a daughter were lost on the ill-fated SS Waratah.

The house was acquired by W. F. Connell, and reconstructed as the "Mount Breckan Club", a high-class guest house. By 1913 it had 38 rooms and a golf course. At the same time, 57 housing blocks on the estate were surveyed and sold. Later the Commonwealth Government bought the house for use as a rehabilitation and training facility for the Royal Australian Air Force. The Bible College of South Australia was there from 1962 to 1978. By 1994 the house was in poor state with signs of damp in the walls and ceiling, and had been vandalised with windows smashed, door furniture stolen, gutters rusted and leaking into the house, and graffiti in nearly every room.

In 1996 Mount Breckan was bought and restored. The main part of the building is now used as a private residence, with the remainder of the building used for accommodation and functions. The property last sold for $2.45 million in 2015, and was on the market again in 2019.
