= South Australian Scholarship =

Scholarship for oversees study awarded by the University of Adelaide

The South Australian Scholarship of £200 for overseas study, tenable for four years, was awarded by the University of Adelaide from 1879 to 1886.

== History ==
The recipients were:

- 1879 — Thomas Hudson Beare (1859–1940), later Sir Thomas Hudson Beare, professor of engineering in the University of Edinburgh. He is a descendant of settlers who came to South Australia in 1836.
- 1880 — Percy Ansell Robin (1861–1937), a son of Theophilus Robin, graduated in an English university, taught at Ipswich Grammar and became headmaster of the Church of England Grammar School, Ballarat in 1910.
- 1881 — Sydney Ernest Holder (1862 – 11 January 1889) graduated in medicine at the University of London and became a lecturer on the staff. He was on his way to China to accept an appointment, when his ship Priam, a steel-hulled steamship of 2165 tons was wrecked near Sissargus Island off the coast of Spain, and he was drowned.
- 1882 — Arthur Donaldson (c. 1861 –1891), son of the later notorious Rev. Joseph McAfee Donaldson of Kapunda, went to England to pursue his studies in medicine, and died in the US from tuberculosis.
- 1883 — George John Robert Murray (1863–1942), later Sir George Murray, Chancellor of Adelaide University and Chief Justice.
- 1884 — James Westwood Leitch (1867–1893) graduated in medicine at Edinburgh. Returned to Adelaide and entered into private practice, but died soon afterwards of tuberculosis.
- 1885 — William Alfred Edgcumbe Tucker (1868–1892) graduated at Adelaide University in arts and law. He entered the Edinburgh University as a medical student, began brilliantly, but was unable to complete the course because of ill-health. He returned to Adelaide and died from tuberculosis.
- 1886 — William John "Willie" Walker (1869–1901), whose education began at Allen Martin's school in Port Adelaide, took up medicine in Edinburgh, returned to Adelaide, married Mary Delano (1872–1905) in 1896, and died from tuberculosis.

A popular myth arose that the award carried a curse which Dr. R. S. Rogers, of Hutt Street, Adelaide, suspected lay behind its peremptory cancellation. Rogers believed the four tuberculosis victims contracted the disease in the small bed-sitting rooms which were allocated to overseas students. Rogers came equal first with Holder in the 1881 examination; they agreed to settle the tie with a supplementary examination at which Holder was successful and was drowned some five years later. Rogers went on to a successful career which culminated in his gaining a D.Sc. at the age of 74.
