= J. R. Robertson =

Educator in South Australia

James Robert Robertson (1867 – 14 January 1928) was an educator in South Australia, head of Prince Alfred College preparatory school.

== History ==
Robertson was born in Orkney, and was brought out to Australia by his parents when a boy.

He attended the Port Adelaide Public School in the days of headmaster Allen Martin, and like his fellow schoolmate and lifelong friend W. R. Bayly, won a scholarship to Prince Alfred College, which he joined as a student in 1881.

He joined the staff of Prince Alfred College in 1884 and was appointed head of the preparatory school perhaps around 1900. He resigned in 1919 to devote his efforts to Freemasonry.

Despite the early age at which he left for Australia, he was regarded as a "typical Scotsman" by all, especially Andrew D. Young, Chief of the Caledonian Society. He died at his home on The Esplanade, Brighton after a long illness.

== Freemasonry ==
Robertson was initiated in Leopold Lodge, Adelaide, in August, 1895, and served as steward and inner guard in that lodge. In 1901 he was a founder and the first junior warden of St. Peter's Lodge, of which he was installed Worshipful Master in 1903. In 1907 he was a foundation member and first senior warden of Prince Alfred Collegians Lodge, and was installed as Master the following year. He was a Grand Steward of the Grand Lodge in 1904, Grand Standard Bearer in 1909, then Grand Inspector of Lodges for three years. In 1910 he became a member of the Board of General Purposes in 1910, and was appointed Assistant Grand Secretary in 1917. Exalted in the South Australian Royal Arch Chapter in 1900, he was installed First Principal in 1906, and was a foundation Companion and the First Principal of the United Collegians' Chapter in 1912. In 1916 he was installed Grand H. of the Supreme Grand Chapter. He was advanced in Adelaide Mark Lodge in March, 1911, and filled every office in that lodge, becoming Worshipful Master in 1919. He was organist of the Adelaide Royal Ark Mariners' Lodge attached to the Adelaide Mark Lodge. He also held office in the Earl of Euston Knight Templar Preceptory, and the Earl of Euston Rose Croix Chapter. He was Past Second Grand Principal of the Supreme Grand Royal Arch Chapter and Grand Inspector of Chapters, He was also Assistant Grand Secretary of the Grand Lodge of Mark Master Masons.

Charles R. J. Glover (Grand Secretary of the Grand Lodge of Freemasons) paid a tribute to his service to the Craft:

He was not only my right hand man,. but also a close personal friend of many years' standing. His death will. be a great loss, not only to the whole of the Craft in South Australia, by whom he was beloved and respected, but to many personal friends who will mourn his death. He was an expert on ritual and one of the best-informed Freemasons in Australia, with a wide knowledge of Craft history and jurisprudence.

== Family ==
James Robert Robertson married Martha Marie Helene Feuerheerdt ( –1952) of Crower station near Lucindale on 28 August 1909. They had no children.
