= Flinders Island (disambiguation) =

Flinders Island is an island in the Furneaux Group, Tasmania, Australia.

Flinders Island may also refer to:

In Australia:

- Flinders Island (Queensland)
- Flinders Island (South Australia), in the Investigator Group
- Flinders Island (Western Australia), one of the St Alouarn Islands in Western Australia
- Flinders Islet is one of the Five Islands near Port Kembla.

== See also ==
- Flinders (disambiguation)
