= W. R. Bayly =

Educator in South Australia

William Reynolds Bayly (21 May 1867 – 9 November 1937) was an educator in South Australia, headmaster of Prince Alfred College from 1915 to 1929.

== History ==
Bayly was born in Port Adelaide, a son of William Lansell Bayly (c. 1836–1911) and his wife Mary Ellen Bayly, née Phillips (c. 1842–1901), the first couple to be married in the Wesleyan Church, Brighton. W. L. Bayly was Secretary of the East End Market and a founder of the Port Adelaide Institute. W. R. Bayly was educated at Port Adelaide State School when Allen Martin was headmaster, and won a scholarship to study at Prince Alfred College. He entered Adelaide University and qualified M.A. and BSc. He returned to PAC as a master, serving from 1893 to 1909.

In 1909 he was appointed headmaster of Geelong College, where he was known as "Masher Bill", and from 1910 to 1914 did much to improve the school's sporting and scholastic performance, but during a six months' absence overseas his reputation suffered by comparison with the acting head W. T. Price. One College historian reports that he was "self-centred, in the style of R. G. Menzies". In 1915 he returned to PAC to succeed Frederic Chapple as headmaster.

He retired in 1929 and died at his home on Wootoona Terrace, Glen Osmond.

== Other interests ==
Bayly was a fine athlete, a keen lacrosse player, and excelled in rowing.

He was a member of the Adelaide University council from 1915 to 1937.

He was a member and longtime president of the Adelaide Glee Club, Prince Alfred Old Collegians Association and the South Australian branch of the Royal Society of St George.

He and lifelong friend J. R. Robertson had parallel lives: both won scholarships to PAC while at Port Adelaide School. Both were educators with responsible positions at PAC, and each was a prominent Freemason.

== Family ==
William Reynolds Bayly married Elizabeth Dreyer (1869–1959) on 30 March 1899. Their children included:

- Gwendoline Reynolds Bayly (29 July 1900– ) married Ian Richard McTaggart on 20 May 1925
- Clarrie Elizabeth Bayly (1902– )
- Lorna Ellen Bayly (1905– ) married Herbert Champion Hosking in 1927
- George Lancelot Bayly (1907–1972) was married to Alison Jean Bayly
