= Herbert William Gartrell =

Australian professor of mining and metallurgy (1882–1945)

Herbert William Gartrell (14 August 1882 – 8 June 1945) was a South Australian academic and professor of mining and metallurgy at the University of Adelaide.

== Biography ==
Gartrell was born in Maitland, South Australia to blacksmith William Pascoe Gartrell ( –1910) and Martha Gartrell, né Finch ( –1919) of Gawler. He was educated at Port Adelaide under headmaster Allen Martin and won a scholarship to study at St Peter's College, Adelaide, and proceeded to the University of Adelaide, graduating BA and BSc in 1902. In 1903 he won the Tate Memorial Medal for an original essay on Port Victor granite. In 1905 he was awarded an Angas engineering scholarship, which he used to travel to the US and Canada, where he gained valuable work experience and completed studies for an MA at the Columbia University in New York City.

He was appointed foundation lecturer in Mining and Metallurgy at Adelaide University in 1910 and in November 1916 enrolled with the 1st AIF, and left for France in April 1917, serving with the 1st Australian Tunnelling Company in France, then with the 257th Tunnelling Company, Royal Engineers, returning to Adelaide in July 1919 and resumed duty at the School of Mines for the third term.

In 1934, in addition to his University responsibilities he was appointed director of the Bonython laboratory at the South Australian School of Mines and Industries, and served as a consultant to the Council for Scientific and Industrial Research.

He was appointed a full professor in 1938.

After delivering a lecture on the morning of 8 June 1945, he collapsed at home, dying in hospital later that evening. He was buried at Centennial Park.

== Personal life ==
Gartrell married Evangeline Murphy in 1910, and lived in Pittman Street, Payneham. They had one possibly adopted son named Roger Gartrell, who was born before 1916 and engaged to Raye Lorraine Buderick in April 1938.

Gartrell was a worshipper at the Luhrs Road Congregational Church, South Payneham, and was a sponsor of the London Missionary Society.

== Recognition ==
- The Broken Hill Proprietary Co. recognised his value to the mining industry by in 1943 endowing the chair in mining and metallurgy created in 1938.
- The Gartrell School of Mining, Metallurgy and Applied Geology at the South Australian Institute of Technology was established in 1985 by some of his ex-students and named for him.

== Publications ==
- Gartrell, H. W (1923), An introduction to mining finance, Hassell
