= Robert Henry Solly =

Australian architect and politician

Robert Henry Solly (14 December 1883 – 2 November 1968) was an architect and local politician who is best known for serving as Lord Mayor of Melbourne, Victoria from 1953 to 1954.

Robert was the eldest son of Robert Henry Solly (Bob) (who was himself a politician in the Victorian Legislative Council and a founding member of the Australian Labor Party), and was born in Adelaide before the family moved to Melbourne in 1885.

After a lengthy career as a draughtsman (for I. G. Beaver) and architect, having moved away from the more partisan politics of his father, Solly entered local politics as an independent candidate for a seat on the Melbourne City Council. He maintained his seat on the council for the remainder of his life, punctuated by his one-year term as Lord Mayor of Melbourne in 1953–54, which was most notable for the high-profile visit in 1954 of Queen Elizabeth II.

Solly died on 2 November 1968 in East Melbourne, and was buried in Fawkner cemetery. He was survived by his wife and their two daughters.
