= Adolph Bartels =

Australian politician (1819–1878)

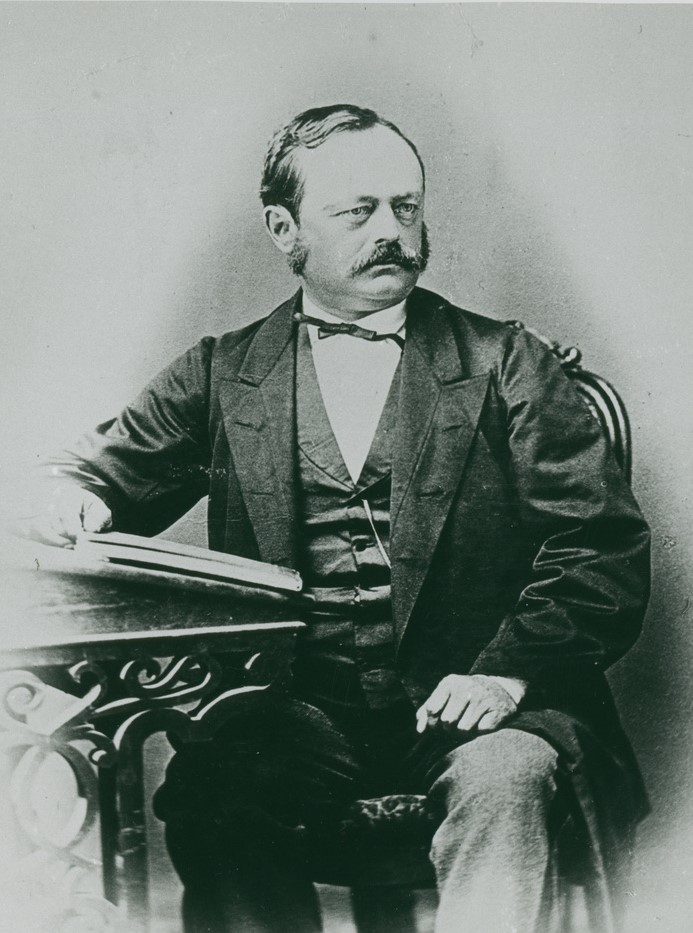

Adolph Heinrich Friedrich Bartels (29 July 1819 – 9 November 1878) was a German-born Australian politician. He was Mayor of Adelaide 1871–1873.

== History ==
Bartels was born in Gilten, Hannover. He grew up in humble circumstances, and trained as a cigarmaker in Hamburg. In Breslau he met Joseph Ernst Seppelt, with whom he travelled to Adelaide via Melbourne around 1845, and for a year worked as a labourer for Seppelt's son Bruno who was experimenting with tobacco and other crops at Seppeltsfield.

He must have returned to Germany around 1847, as it is recorded that Adolph Bartels and his sister Sophie Maria Johanne Henriette (or Maria Sophia Johanne) Bartels arrived in South Australia in April 1848 aboard President Smidt from Bremen with their parents Adolph Johann Cord Bartels (c. 1793 – 1 June 1863) and his wife Wilhelmine C. Bartels (c. 1794 – 26 November 1861). One Hans J. C. Bartels was naturalized in 1849.

He next worked as cigarmaker for retailers Gerke & Rodemann (founded 1849) of 42 Rundle Street, Adelaide. In the early 1850s he joined the exodus of South Australian men to the Victorian goldfields and after his return opened a tobacconist's shop on his own account on Rundle Street, near the York hotel. In 1854 Ludwig Uhlendorf, the licensee of the "King of Hanover" hotel, also on Rundle Street, died.

The "King of Hanover", a single-storey affair, was later rebuilt as an 80-room hotel of two-storeys, then in 1916 became part of John Martin's department store.

The following year Bartels married his widow; they would have four or five children, of whom only one survived to adulthood. In 1856 he took over the hotel's licence, which he maintained until 1865, when he joined in partnership with G. H. C. Meyers as general agents and grain merchants, with which he was involved until the day he died.

His wife died in 1862, the date suggesting complications attending childbirth. A year later he married Anna Weidenbach, of Glen Osmond, who would survive him with six children.

In December 1866, Bartels was elected to the Adelaide City Council as councillor for the Hindmarsh Ward, and served for four years, then after a year's absence from the Council was in December 1871, elected Mayor, and re-elected unopposed the following year.

Bartels was characterised as a man who never spoke unless he had something useful to say. He was diligent in attending to his duties and showed sound business sense in his personal and public life. He died in Adelaide from liver cancer at the age of 58.

== Other interests ==
- Bartels was appointed director of the Permanent Equitable Building Society and several other public companies
- He was a member of the Destitute Board

== Recognition ==
Bartels Road, the continuation of Pirie Street through Adelaide's East Parklands, and part of the Adelaide Street Circuit was named for him before he became Mayor.

== Family ==
Bartels (died 1878) married Rudolphine Friederike Auguste Uhlendorf (died 1862 aged 28) in 1855. She had been licensee, "King of Hanover" hotel to 1855. He married again on 23 July 1863, to Anna Augusta Weidenbach (died 1910)

- Mary Wilhelmine Bartels (15 September 1855 – ) married Dr Max Friedrich Neubauer ( – 6 December 1888) on 29 May 1877. Max died in Steinhorst, near Hamburg.
- Bertha Bartels (1857–1858)
- Henry Adolph Bartels (16 December 1858 – 1859)
- Henry Albert Bartels (14 May 1860 – 1860)
- Adolph Bartels (1864–1864)
- Paul Adolph Bartels (1865–1909)
- Frank Henry Bartels (1867 – 18 May 1895) married Elizabeth "Lizzie" Jeffery ( – ) in 1892. He was a well-known painter; she ran "Quambi", a private babies' hospital on Pennington Terrace, North Adelaide.

- Doris Eileen "Patsy" Bartels (1893 – ) married Ian Basil Pender on 7 December 1921.
- Pauline Berkeley "Pauli" Bartels (1894– ) married Rudolph "Rudi" Bronner in England on 7 April 1917. Both girls were students at Dryburgh House

- Elizabeth Pauline Berkeley Bronner (1919– ) married Donald Malcolm Reid in Sydney on 6 August 1940

- Laura Diosma (or Diosma Laura) Bartels (1869– ) married Diedrich Heinrich Schmidt in 1888
- Anna Sophia "Annie" Bartels (1871– ) married Karl Schinzinger in 1891
- Adelaide Selma Bartels (1873–1874)
- Iris Bartels (1876– ) married Traugott Carl Louis Rudolf Schneider in 1904
- Selma Bartels (1878–1962) married artist Hans Heysen (8 October 1877 – 2 July 1968) in 1904

- Nora Heysen (11 January 1911 – 30 December 2003) was also a successful artist

His sister Sophie Maria Johanne Henriette (or Maria Sophia Johanne) (died 1900) married Julius Heinrich Christof Eitzen (died 1897) in 1857. Eitzen arrived in SA May 1855 aboard August from Hamburg.
