= Arthur Purnell =

William Arthur Purnell FRAIA (5 January 1878 – 29 June 1964), generally known as Arthur Purnell, and sometimes A W Purnell, was an Australian-born architect who had a very successful practice in Canton, China, in the 1900s, and from 1910 mainly in Melbourne, Australia, often with partners. He is most noted in Melbourne for the few designs that include Chinese references, but had a long career designing many houses, businesses and sporting facilities. His best known designs included the 1922 Wattle Path dance hall in St Kilda (later the St Moritz ice rink, demolished 1982), and the 1937 Southern Stand at the MCG (demolished 1990).

== Early life and education ==
William Arthur Purnell was born on 5 January 1878, the eldest son of William Purnell Jnr, and his wife Emily, née Keown of Geelong, Victoria.

He attended Geelong Grammar School and earned a diploma of architecture at the University of Melbourne.

His father and grandfather were partners in Purnell & Sons, builders, and Arthur joined the firm as a draftsman in 1895, then took further studies under C. A. Heyward, a government architect.

== The China years ==
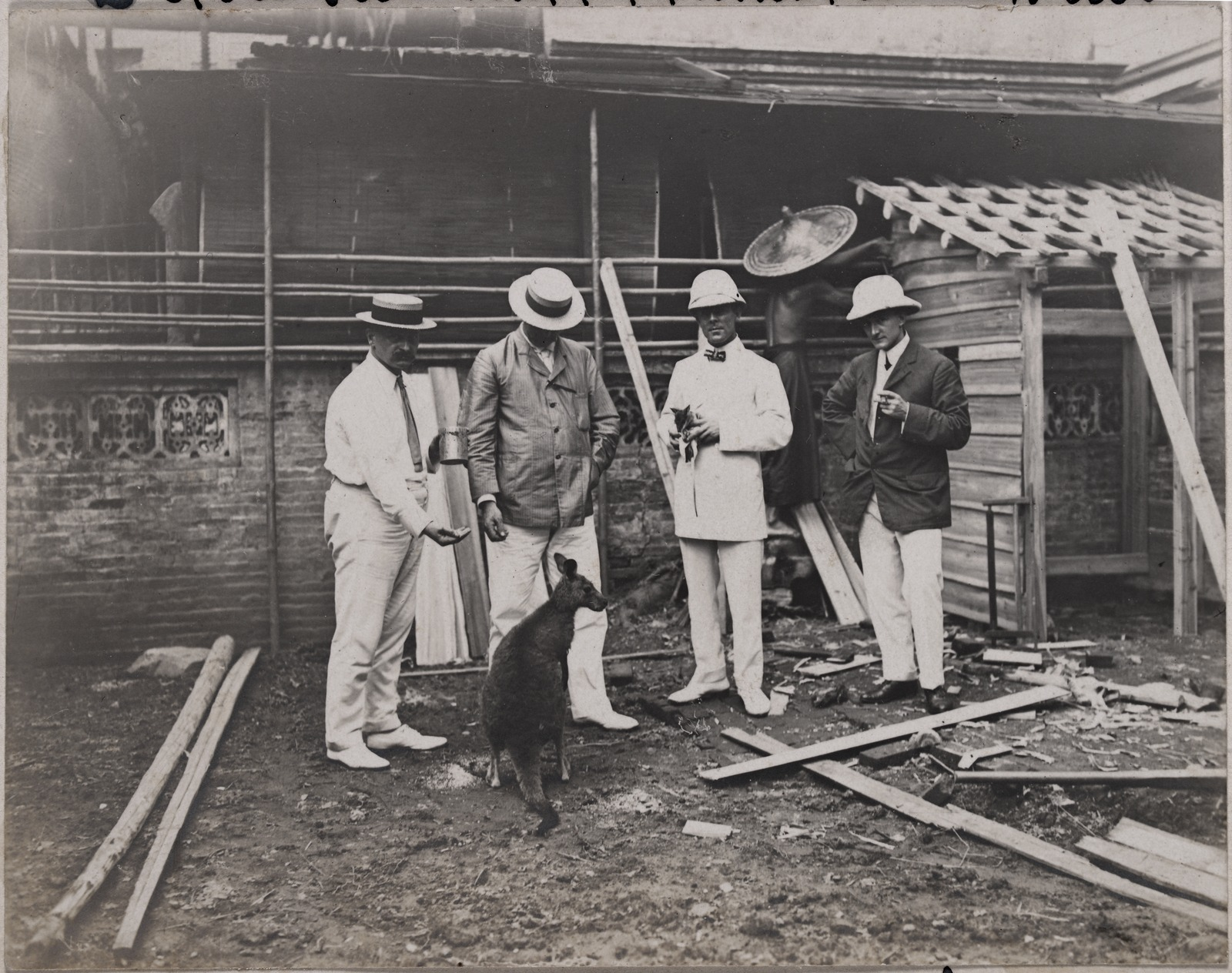
Purnell with pet Kangaroo and joey, Canton 1908

In 1900 Purnell left for China, and established himself in Canton (modern Guangzhou) in 1903. In 1904 he teamed up with Charles Souders Paget (1874–1933), a civil engineer from Bethlehem, Pennsylvania, as Purnell & Paget, winning the competition for a new Customs House the same year, and they soon developed a busy practice. They designed numerous projects, including large buildings for the Chinese Imperial Post Office, the London Missionary Society, the Canton Christian College, the Southern Baptist Theological School, and a power station for China Light & Power, which have all been demolished as Guangzhou has been redeveloped in recent years.

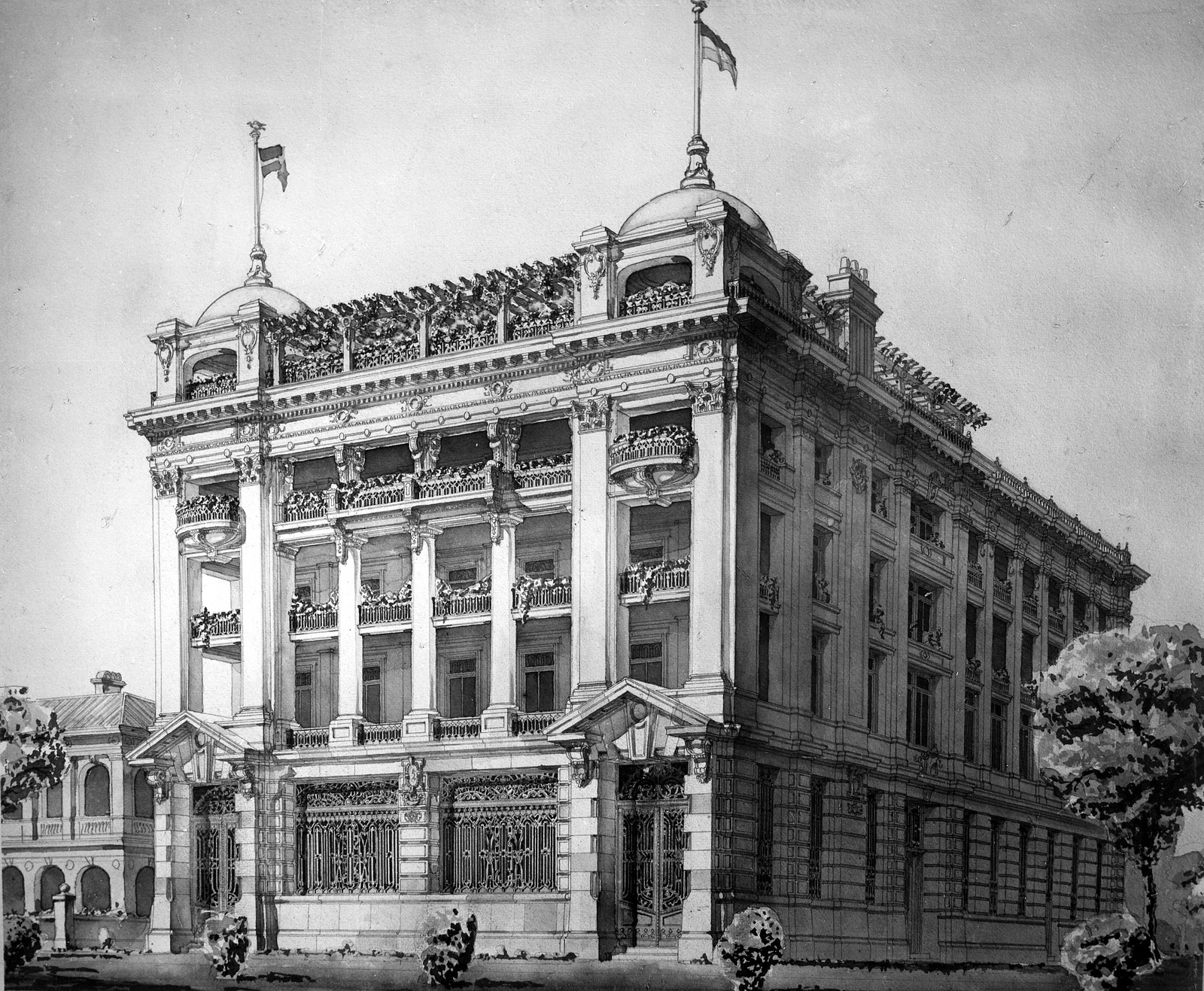
Karberg & Co sketch 1908

The former British and French concession Shamian Island (then known as Shameen) however is completely intact, and hosts a number of designs by the firm, as well as alterations such as extra floors. They include the Imperial Maritime Customs Building (known as the Red Building, eastern end of Central Shamian Street on the north side, with a pair of 'witches hat' towers, 1907), Griffith & Co (south west corner of North Shamian and Third Streets, c1905), Karberg & Co, (50 South Shamian Street, 1908), International Banking Co (locally known as Sassoon & Co, end of Central Shamian on the north side, 1908), Deacon & Co (northwest corner of Central Shamian and Fifth, 1908). All of the designs were generally in the Far East British Colonial form known as 'compradoric', featuring multi-level verandahs supported on solid pillars or arches, with Italianate or Edwardian Baroque detailing.

One of his designs outside Shamian to survive is the South China / Canton Cement Factory built in 1909, which was later used by Chinese Nationalist leader Sun Yat-sen as his home and headquarters from 1917 to 1923, and is now a museum.

Purnell returned to Melbourne in 1910, and practiced alone for some years. He set up office in the Nicholson Chambers at 101 Swanston Street, and later Phair's Buildings at 327 Collins Street.

== Designs with Chinese connections ==
As soon as he returned, his practice included some Chinese links. He worked for people and businesses of Chinese origin, while a few designs of his own contained elements of Chinese design, or featured Chinese names. For instance he designed a warehouse in Melbourne's Chinatown in Punch Lane off Little Bourke Street in 1911 for cabinetmaker Tye Shing (demolished).

His own house at 17 Munro Street Armadale, built in 1914 in an Edwardian style, was called Shameen (Shamian) in a clear reference to his time in China. Very soon after, in 1916, he built his second house nearby at 1050 Malvern Road, also called Shameen. This was an early example of the Bungalow style, with exaggerated verandah piers and projecting chimney pots with a slightly Oriental character (destroyed by fire in 1995).

Clearer use of Chinese design motifs can be seen an unbuilt tearoom design for Malvern in 1913 which featured a distinctly Oriental roof and verandah. This was followed by Tsohshaan Mansions (tsohshaan is supposedly Cantonese for "house upon the hill"), at the corner of Malvern and Irving Roads in Toorak, built 1917, which has an Oriental feel achieved without overt Chinese elements. In 1928 he designed another teahouse, at 22 Newcombe Street Portarlington (demolished), which featured a distinctly Chinese roof shape.

His most well-known Chinese-influenced design, and possibly the best known of all his works, is his third house for himself, located on a busy city artery, at 492 Punt Road, South Yarra. This is a substantial reworking of a house he had designed for his client "Alec" Barlow in 1924, which he bought and named Shan Teng. He added a number of rooms, changing the orientation, and in particular the roof, which he altered just before construction from a simple hipped roof to one with a curved Chinese shape. His daughter recalled that the family had Chinese servants indentured from an American ships captain.

== Beaver and Purnell ==
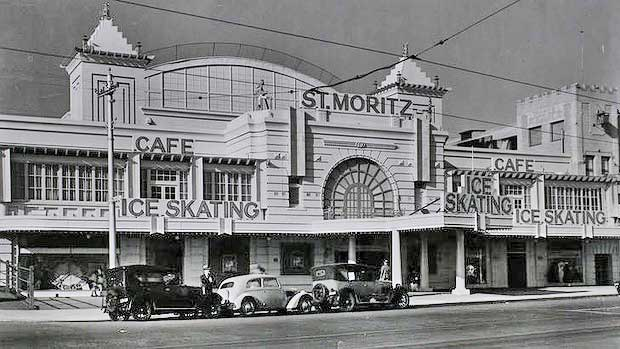
Wattle Path Palais, St Kilda, 1922, later St Moritz Ice Rink

In 1915 he joined with Isidor Beaver at his practice at Altson's Buildings, 82 Elizabeth Street, Melbourne, on the Collins Street corner. Beaver was a Manchester-born architect who had been in partnership with Edmund Wright in Adelaide and moved to Melbourne in 1890 to supervise construction of their National Mutual Life building on the corner of Collins Street and Queen Street.

A notable design of this time was Michael's Corner, built in 1915 using then relatively new reinforced concrete, which still stands on the south west corner of Elizabeth and Lonsdale Streets.

The next year they designed Ranmoor, 395 Glenferrie Road, Malvern (demolished) a radical design of plain rendered masses reflecting an influence of the Prairie School, and perhaps Walter Burley Griffin.

In 1925 they designed Carinya, a Spanish / Mediterranean mansion at 61 Clendon Road, Toorak.

Another high profile project by the firm was the 1922 Wattle Path Palais de Danse, a large arched roofed dance hall on the Esplanade at St Kilda. In 1939 it was converted into the well known St Moritz Ice Rink, controversially demolished in 1982.

Purnell left the partnership in 1925; Beaver, 19 years his senior, died in 1934.

In the 1920s Purnell had a close working relationship with car dealer Alexander George "Alec" Barlow (1880–1937), for whom he built a home, car showrooms and racing stables.

== After Beaver ==
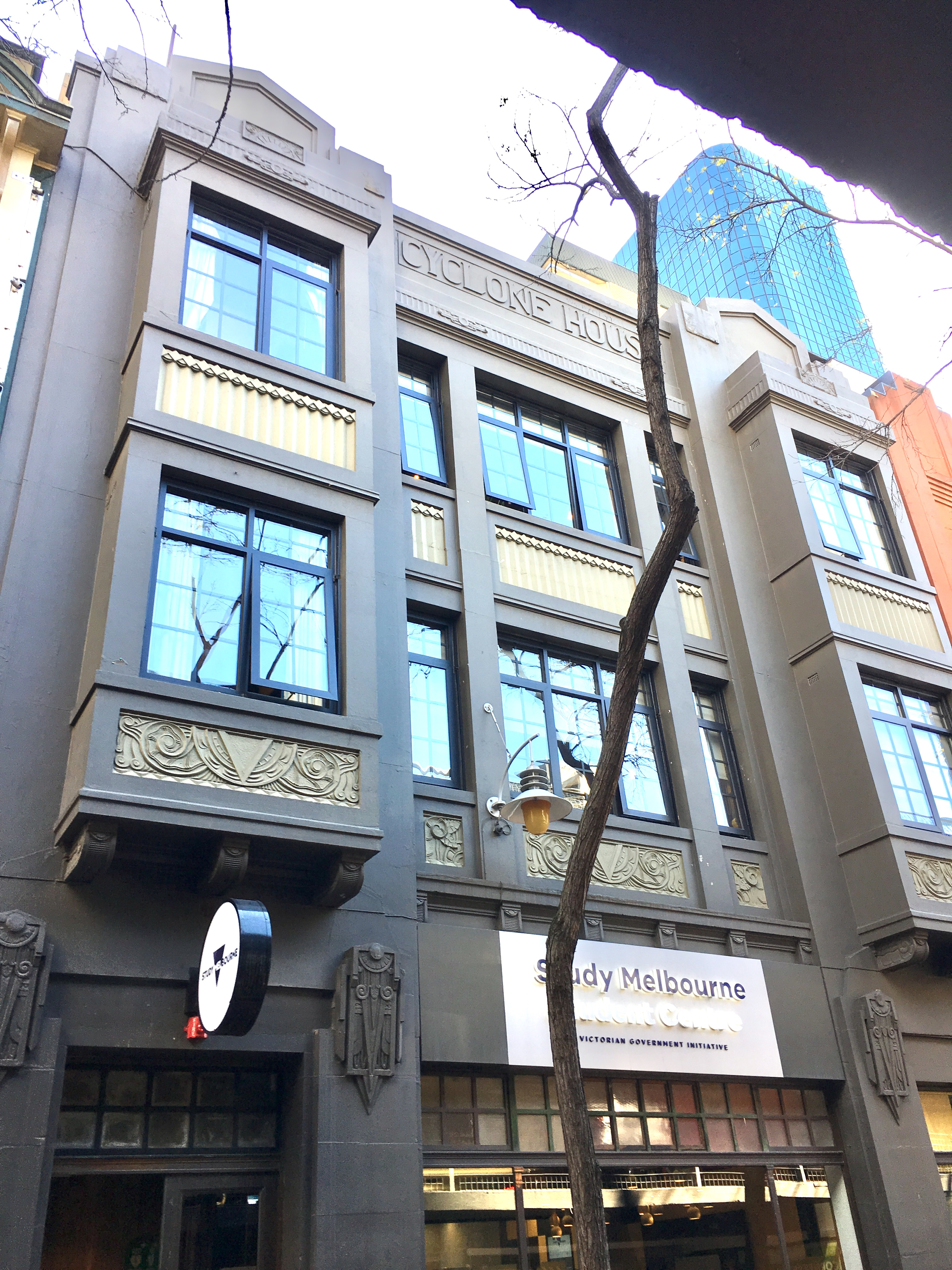
Cyclone House, Hardware Street, 1930

In 1925 Purnell moved to offices in the Equitable Building at 314 Collins Street, in a partnership with a Mr Stone which lasted about a year. In 1928 he briefly formed a partnership with Eric Hazel Round and William Alfred Graham as Arthur W. Purnell, Round & Graham, which only lasted only a year, and he went into solo practice again for the next five or so years.

In 1930 he became an early adopter of the new Art Deco style; his office and showroom for Cyclone Wire in Hardware Street completed in September 1930 was amongst the first projects in Melbourne to sport the new geometric decoration.

In 1935 he formed A. W. Purnell & Pearce, with Phillip Foster Pearce ARAIA, still at the same address. By the time Pearce retired in 1946, their offices were at the Colonial Mutual Life building in Collins Street, the same building by a different name.

As well as a great number of private residences in a multitude of styles, works produced during this time include a wide range of commercial projects, many now demolished:

- Clifton Springs Golf Club (1926)
- A greyhound-racing track at Tottenham (1927, demolished)
- Rickards Motor Showrooms, Elizabeth Street (1927, demolished)
- Regent Theatre, Ballarat, with Cedric Ballantyne (1927)
- A grandstand at Western Oval (now Whitten Oval) (1929, extensively altered)
- Woolstore No 2, Younghusband Woolstore, Kensington (1928 + 1932)
- Cyclone House, Hardware Street, Melbourne (1930)
- Patersons Furniture Store, 152 Bourke Street (1934)
- Younghusband Woolstore, Albury (1936, demolished)
- The Olympia Sea Water Swimming Pool at South Melbourne (1937, demolished)
- Southern Stand, Melbourne Cricket Ground (1937, demolished)
- 'Home on sloping site', Creswick Street, Hawthorn (1937)
- The Rosebud Yacht Club (1939, demolished)
- Glaciarium, South Melbourne, interior remodelling (1939, demolished)
- Avonmore Lodge (maisonettes), Toorak Road, cnr Glenferrie Road, Toorak, 1940
- The Olympic Stand at the Melbourne Cricket Ground (1953–1955, demolished).

== Personal life ==
Purnell returned briefly to Melbourne in 1908 to marry Jane (Ginnie) Farrell. Her parents were pastoralists from Lake Monemia near Streatham, Victoria.

The hot humid climate of Southern China did not suit her and may have been the reason they returned to Australia in 1910. Their only child, a daughter Joan, was born in 1918, ten years after their marriage. In 1923 they divorced, but three years later they remarried. Ginnie died on 25 October 1966.

Joan Margaret Purnell married Noel William Dickson in 1939, and died in 2002.

== Gallery ==
Karberg & Co, Samian, Guangzhou, 1908

International Banking Corporation, Shamian, Guangzhou, 1908

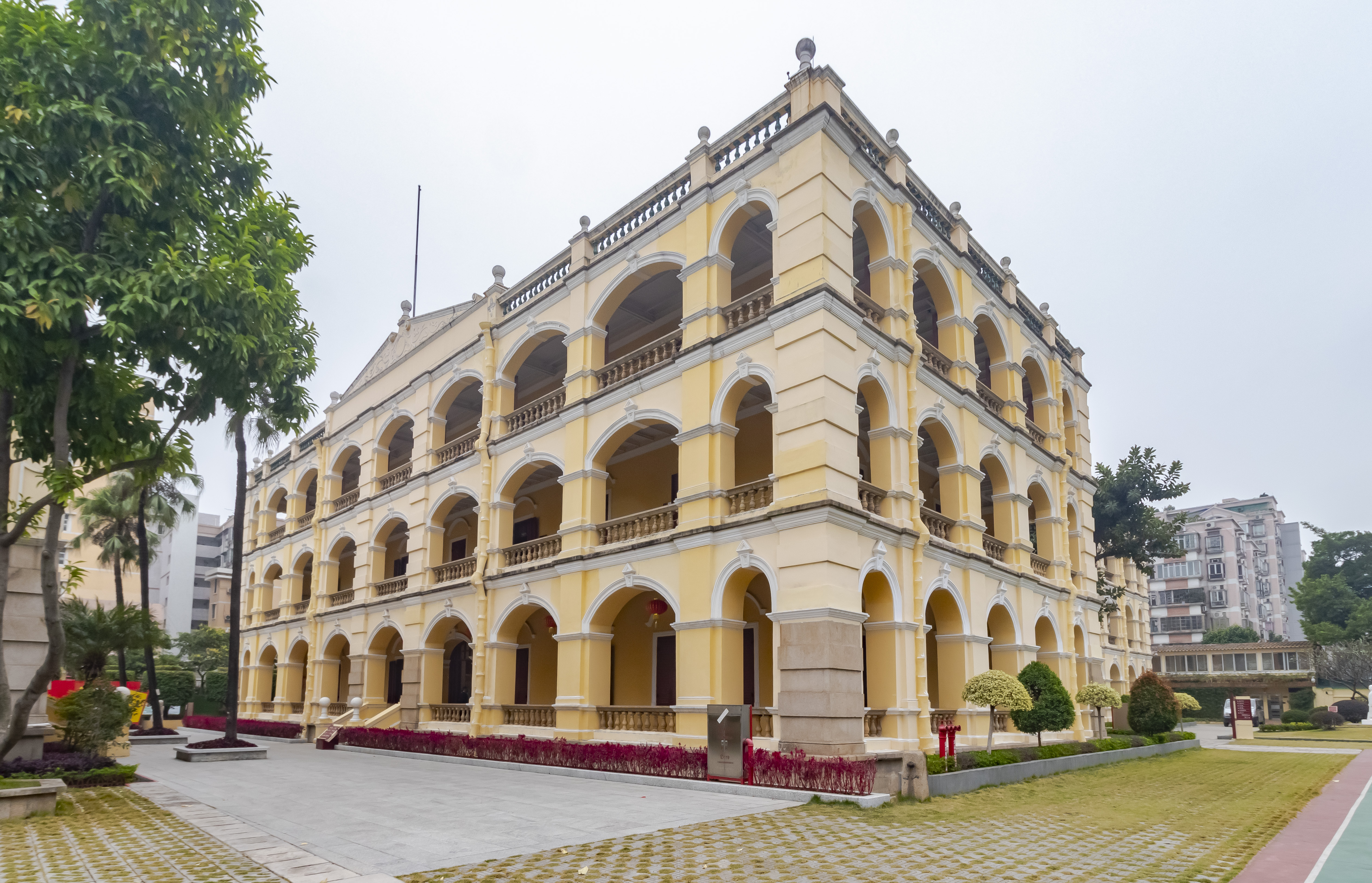
Canton Cement Factory, Guangzhou, 1909 (now Sun Yat Sen museum)

Imperial Maritime Customs house, Shamian, Guangzhou, 1909

Shameen, Armadale, 1914

Michaels Store, Elizabeth Street, 1915

395 Glenferrie Road, Malvern, 1916

Shameen (no2), Glenferrie Road, Malvern 1916

Patersons Furniture, Bourke Street, 1934

MCG Southern Stand (top of image), 1936
