= Isidor George Beaver =

British-born architect in South Australia (1859–1934)

- Born: December 1859; Manchester, England
- Died: 24 October 1934 (aged 74); Armadale, Victoria, Australia
- Resting place: Melbourne Cemetery, Carlton, Victoria, Australia
- Occupation: Architect
- Buildings: National Mutual Life building, Melbourne (1893)

Isidor George Beaver (December 1859 – 24 October 1934) was an English architect who had a substantial career in Adelaide, South Australia and Melbourne, Victoria. He was also significant in the early history of ice skating in Australia.

His given name was often misspelt as "Isidore", and his surname as "Beavor" or "Beevor", and he was often referred to as J. G. Beaver, even in his own advertisements.

== Early life ==
Isidor George Beaver (Note: His birth record may be found via the General Register Office website after registering, here. It shows his name as Beaver, Isidor George, born in the December quarter of 1859 in Manchester, mother's maiden name Mayer. (GRO Reference: Volume 08D, p.308.)) was born between September and December 1859, the son of watchmaker and jeweller Louis Beaver of Manchester, England, a Jewish émigré from Prussian Poland. He had two sisters, Evelyn and Laura, who migrated to Melbourne and Adelaide respectively before Isidor left England.

== Career ==
=== 19th century ===
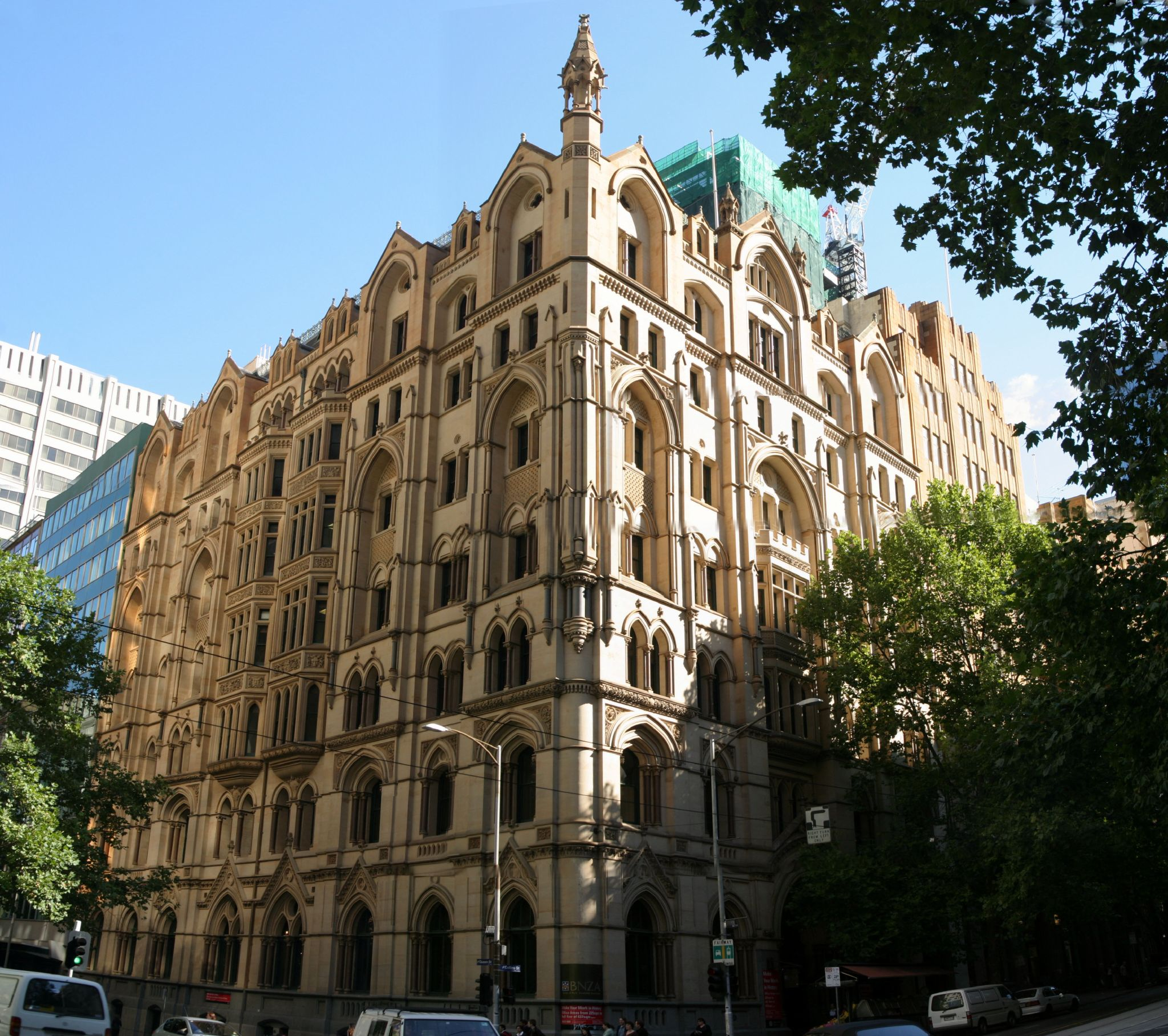
National Mutual Life building (1893)

Beaver emigrated to the colony of South Australia sometime before August 1883, the date of the commencement of his architectural partnership with William McMinn in Adelaide. The partnership did not last long as McMinn died in February 1884.

In 1885 he had an office at Torrens Chambers on Victoria Square, Adelaide. H. E. Fuller served his articles with him for four years from 1884. He joined with partners Edmund Wright and James Henry Reed to form Wright, Reed & Beaver in on 31 March 1886, with offices at the Queen's Chambers on Pirie Street. In 1886 their design for the Jubilee Exhibition Building was awarded second prize. Fuller and artist Frank H. Bartels were articled to the practice during the 1880s, and the practice continued under the same name even after the death of Wright in 1888.

In 1889 they won a design contest for the National Mutual Life Association's new Melbourne premises at the south-west corner of Queen and Collins Streets (address 388-399 Collins Street), and set up offices in Queen Street. The office and project were headed by Beaver. The eight-storey building in Federation Gothic / Gothic Revival style, later known as A. C. Goode House, and then Bank of New Zealand in Australia (BNZA) House, now listed on the Victorian Heritage Register. The foundation stone was laid 28 July 1891, and the building completed in March 1893. The entry foyer has marble details. The ceiling of the main chamber is ornamented, consisting of a plaster beam and panel system with freestanding Corinthian columns. The building is unnamed, and has mixed tenancy, with a Zendesk sign above the door in 2022.

On 9 August 1893 Wright, Reed and Beaver was dissolved, and Beaver remained in Melbourne with offices at 125 Queen Street. In 1894 he relocated to the Fourth Victoria Building, 243 Collins Street. R. H. Solly trained as a junior under Beaver and was for four years his chief draftsman before becoming an architect with Wunderlich Ltd. (who had offices in the same building).

=== 20th century ===
In 1901 his office was located at 11 Elizabeth Street, then moved to Altson's Buildings, 82 Elizabeth Street, on the Collins Street corner. In 1915 Arthur William Purnell joined him to form the partnership Beaver & Purnell, which lasted until 1925.

A notable design of this time was the Wattle Path Palais de Danse on the Esplanade at St Kilda, Victoria, a large dance hall, opened in October 1923, architects Beaver & Purnell, though their relative inputs are not yet known. It was built by H. H. Eilenberg of Caulfield. The building became a film studio, Efftee Studios, for Frank W. Thring in December 1933; Thring abandoned the project in 1937. H. H. Kleiner and his wife transformed it into the St. Moritz Ice-skating Palais, which opened in 1939 and finally closed in 1982.

== Professional activities ==
- He was a vice-president of the South Australian Architects Association in 1885, and a founding member of the South Australian Institute of Architects in 1886.
- In 1887, he taught building construction at the School of Design under Harry P. Gill. He conducted classes in technical drawing at the School of Design from 1889.
- He was honorary treasurer of the Royal Victorian Institute of Architects in 1910.

== Sporting and cultural ==
- Beaver was, in 1883, a foundation member of the Holdfast Bay Yacht Club, known for his yacht Bonita.
- It is likely he was the J. G. Beaver who participated in chess tournaments in the 1880s.
- He swam competitively in the Glenelg pool.
- From 1901 he rode to hounds with the Melbourne Hunt Club, and was still riding regularly until two months before his death in October 1934.
- From 1913 he was a member of the Toorak Bowling Club.
- He was an expert skater, a member of the Original London Skating Club and a director of the company (H. W. Allen, I. G. Beaver, H. Kendall, Dr C. F. Macgillicuddy, A. G. Outhwaite, and V. C. Turner) which was formed in 1926 to take over the lease on the Melbourne Glaciarium, 10 City Road South Melbourne, when it was facing closure. The company became Glaciarium Ltd sometime before the 1930 season opened, with L. R. Molloy, manager of the Glaciarium, as managing director. The Glaciarium showed a profit almost every year until the 1950s.
- Beaver was president of the National Ice Skating Association in 1928 at least, and president of the Victorian Ice Skating Association in 1932. He was a sponsor of ice hockey, and one of the first four teams in Melbourne (and in Australia) was named "The Beavers" in recognition of his support.

== Selected works ==
- Beaver was associated with William McMinn in the design of extensions to the Masonic Hall in Waymouth Street, Adelaide, in 1883, although McMinn is cited as the main architect; Beaver was supervising architect after McMinn's death in February 1884.
- In 1885 he designed a substantial residence in Stirling West, near the Mount Lofty railway station, for William Milne Jnr, which employed solid stone window piers 9 feet (2.7 m) tall, and extensive use of Mintaro slate.
- He designed an institute building at Manoora and a house Mile End
- Wright, Reed and Beaver: Cabra Dominican Convent in Cumberland Park (1886); Federal Building Society and Savings Institute, King William Street, Adelaide (1887); Bank of New South Wales, corner of King William Street and North Terrace, Adelaide (1888)
- Supervised National Mutual Life building (now Goode House) at 389-399 Collins St, Melbourne, 1889–93, contribution to design not known.
- Extensions to the Fourth Victorian Building Society's building at 243 Collins Street (which same building he later occupied) in 1894
- He designed the Outpatients' wards at the Queen Victoria Hospital, opened in 1902, and nine years later their operating theatre dedicated by the National Council of Women as a memorial to Dr. Mary Page Stone.
- He designed the Toorak Bowling Club's original wooden pavilion, which was erected in 1914 and still stands, heritage listed.
- "Carinya", the Toorak mansion built in 1926 for Herbert William Lee, was designed by Beaver and Purnell.

== Personal life ==
Beaver may have been a Freemason. He never married. Although a member of a Jewish family, there is (unlike his sisters) no mention of him in the Jewish press.

Evelyn Salenger (1847–1934) of Sydney, and Laura Schlank (1851–1918) of Adelaide were sisters who emigrated to South Australia aboard the SS Somersetshire in 1870. Laura was married to Salis Schlank ( –1892), a well-known manufacturing jeweller.

Albert Beaver (died 16 March 1909), who was arrested for embezzlement in 1897, and then released under curious circumstances was a brother.

== Death and legacy ==
He died at his home, 23 Wynstay Road, Armadale and was buried in the Melbourne Cemetery, Carlton, Victoria. The chief beneficiary of his will was a niece.
