= Flinders =

Flinders may refer to:

== Places ==
=== Antarctica ===
- Flinders Peak, near the west coast of the Antarctic Peninsula

=== Australia ===
==== New South Wales ====
- Flinders County, New South Wales
- Shellharbour Junction railway station, Shellharbour
- Flinders, New South Wales, a suburb of Shellharbour

==== Queensland ====
- Electoral district of Flinders (Queensland), former state electoral district
- Flinders Highway, Queensland
- Flinders Island (Queensland), part of the Great Barrier Reef Marine Park
- Flinders Reef
- Flinders River
- Flinders View, Queensland, a suburb of Ipswich
- Shire of Flinders (Queensland), a Local Government Area located in north western Queensland

==== South Australia ====
- County of Flinders, a cadastral unit
- Electoral district of Flinders, a state electoral district
- Flinders, South Australia, former name of the town of Streaky Bay.
- Flinders Highway, South Australia
- Flinders Island (South Australia), in the Investigator Group
- Flinders Medical Centre, the hospital associated with the Flinders University
- Flinders Park, South Australia, an inner-western suburb of Adelaide
- Flinders Ranges (disambiguation), articles associated with the mountain range
- Flinders Street, Adelaide
- Flinders railway station
- Flinders University

==== Tasmania ====
- Flinders Council, a local government area
- Flinders Island, in the Furneaux Group, in Bass Strait

==== Victoria ====
- Division of Flinders, federal House of Representatives electoral division in Victoria
- Flinders Lane, Melbourne
- Flinders Naval Base and Flinders Naval Depot, former names of HMAS Cerberus (naval base)
- Flinders Street railway station
- Flinders Street, Melbourne
- Flinders Street Viaduct
- Flinders, Victoria, a historic town south of Melbourne on the Mornington Peninsula
- Flinders Wharf, Melbourne
- Melbourne Park formerly known as Flinders Park, home of the Australian Open Tennis Championships
- Shire of Flinders (Victoria)

==== Western Australia ====
- Flinders Bay

=== Canada ===
- Cape Flinders, in the northern Canadian territory of Nunavut

== People ==
- Flinders Petrie (1853–1942), English Egyptologist
- Matthew Flinders (academic) (born 1972), British academic and political scientist
- Matthew Flinders (1774–1814), British explorer, after whom all the geographic features listed above were directly or indirectly named.
- Mesh Flinders (born 1979), American screenwriter
- Scott Flinders (born 1986), English football goalkeeper

== Other ==
- Flinders (ship), several ships of this name, including:
  - HMAS Flinders (GS 312), a survey ship in service 1973–1998
  - Flinders (schooner), a South Australian Government vessel 1865–1873
- The Flinders News, a South Australian newspaper published in Port Pirie
- Flinders Ranges mogurnda, a gudgeon (fish)
- 10203 Flinders, an asteroid

== See also ==
- Flinders Island (disambiguation)
