= St. Moritz Ice Rink =

Former dance hall and then ice rink in St Kilda, Australia

Coordinates: 37°51′55″S 144°58′29″E

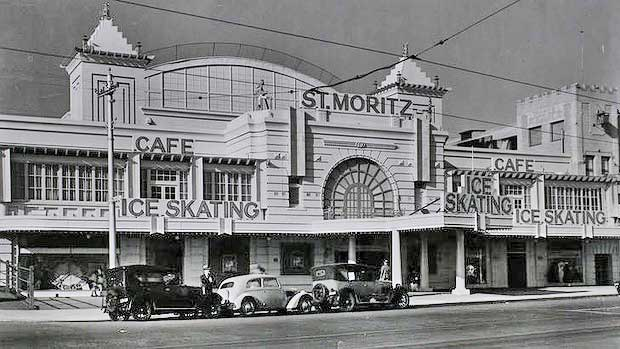
- St. Moritz Ice Rink circa 1939–1944
- Interactive map of St. Moritz Ice Rink
- Location: 16 The Esplanade, St. Kilda, Victoria
- Capacity: 750

Construction
- Opened: March 10, 1939

The St. Moritz Ice Rink, built as the Wattle Path Palais de Danse in 1923 and then used as Efftee Studios from 1933, was an ice rink on The Esplanade, St. Kilda, Victoria, which operated between 1939–1981. Opened as St. Moritz Ice-skating Palais, as one of only two ice rinks in Melbourne in the 1940s and 1950s, it played a central role in the development of ice hockey in Australia. Closed in 1982, it soon suffered a major fire and was then demolished, an event later seen as a major blow to the heritage of St Kilda.

== History ==
The St. Moritz was first built as the Wattle Path Palais de Danse in 1922–3, opened in October 1923, a very large dance hall designed by architects Beaver & Purnell. Located on the Upper Esplanade in St Kilda, it was part of the transformation in the early 20th century of the foreshore area from a row of mansions facing a beach, into a playground for the masses. The Wattle Path was the venue for the first all-Australian dance championship, and featured some of the best dance bands of Australia, as well as from America. Popular throughout the 1920s, it suffered due to the Great Depression, and closed in the early 1930s. In 1933, the building became a film studio, Efftee Studios, for Frank W. Thring, who made some of his half-dozen movies in the cavernous building before moving the project to Sydney in 1936.

In 1938, businessman Henry Hans "Harry" Kleiner announced a project to transform the Wattle Path to an ice rink, and the St. Moritz was born.

The grand opening of the St. Moritz Ice-skating Palais was on Friday 10 March 1939. The arrival of celebrities to the opening was announced on the radio station 3XY and commentary about the interior and events was provided by Norman Banks of the radio station 3KZ. The cost of entry to the official opening of the St. Moritz Ice Rink was 5 shillings, which was inclusive of tax as well as skate hire for the night for over 2000 people that attended. The St. Kilda mayor, Councillor E. C. Mitty, formally opened the new ice skating rink.

Harry Kleiner was sole proprietor until 1953, when he sold the business to J. Gordon and T. Molony, both champion skaters.

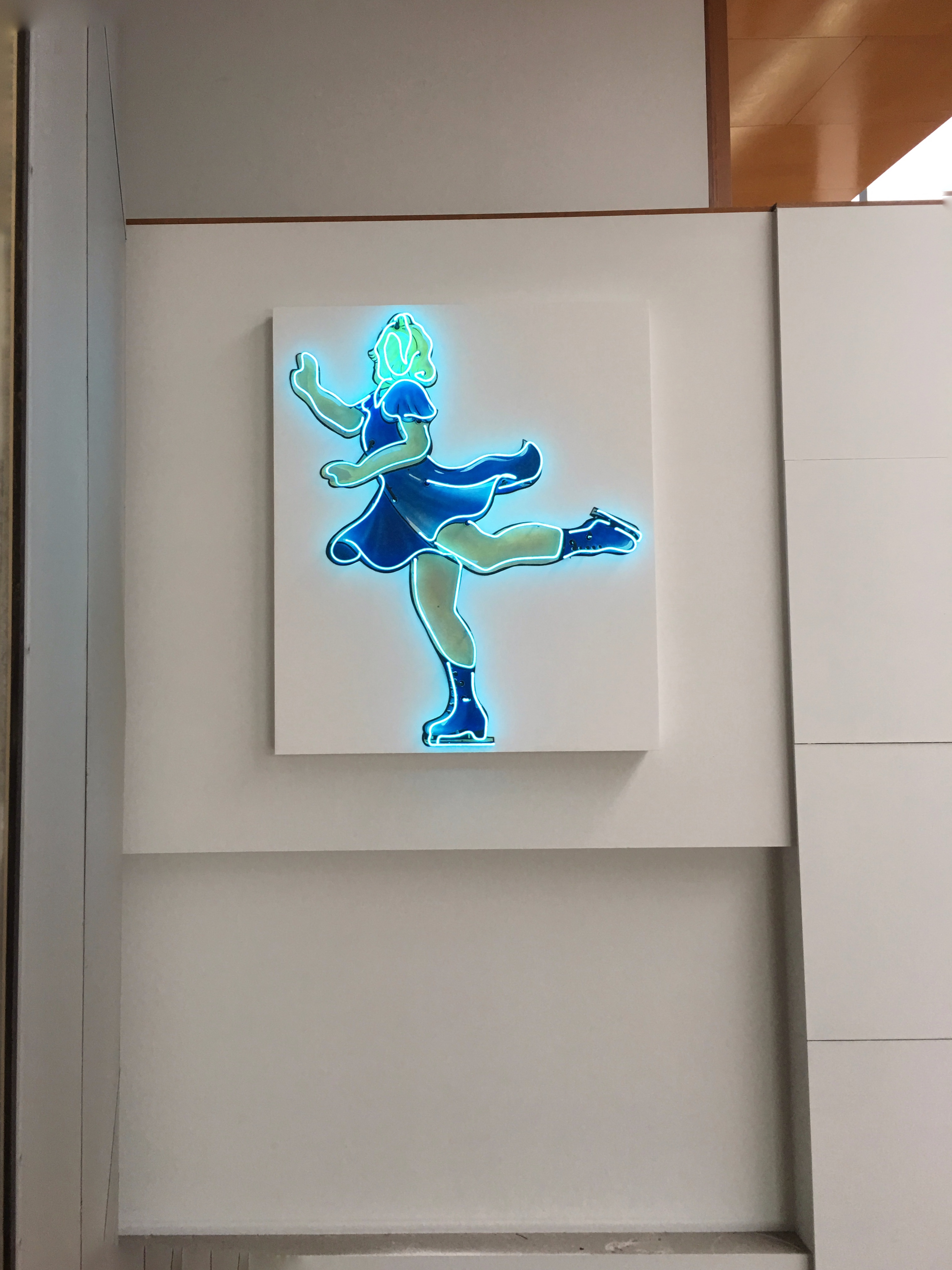
St Moritz Skating Girl at the St Kilda Town Hall

The St. Moritz rink operated for over forty years, but in the 1970s trade declined in the face of competition from newer venues in the suburbs as well as roller skating and discotheques. In 1980 it was sold to developers Hudson Conway and trucking magnate Lindsay Fox (who had grown up in St Kilda and played ice hockey in the venue), but continued to operate, closing suddenly in early 1982, amid fears for its future. It was then nominated to the Historic Buildings Preservation Council, but a majority of City of St Kilda councillors voted to oppose this action and uphold a demolition permit already issued. The building suffered a fire later that year, leaving only the facades, which were demolished soon after. The site remained vacant until about 1991, when a mid-price hotel was constructed called the St Moritz, which dropped the reference in 1993 become just the Novotel St Kilda.

Two neon signs of skating girls were rescued from the facade by local identity Tom Ingram, one of which was re-erected within the cafe of the hotel, then covered over, rediscovered in 2005, and then donated to the St Kilda Historical Society. In 2018 the 'Skating Girl' was donated to the city of Port Phillip, restored and erected within the St Kilda Town Hall.

The hotel closed in 2019 to be replaced by a luxury apartment development.

== Ice hockey ==
The Australian prime minister at the time, Robert Menzies, advised that, despite the declaration of war, sport should go on, and the Victorian Ice Hockey Association made the decision to continue ice hockey with inter-rink competitions between the Melbourne Glaciarium and St. Moritz Ice Rink teams. The St. Moritz Bombers won the first 3 games. There was also inter-team competition between the Rhodes Motor Co. Topliners and Foy's Gibsonia Fliers.

=== August 1946 ===
A highlight moment for inter-state ice hockey happened during the annual tournament, where Victoria and New South Wales faced each other for the Goodall Cup in a best-of-three style tournament. The series ended with a tie, making this the second time that the Goodall Cup was not awarded to a winning team, rather it was retained by the previous years champion team. This series also saw a record attendance of 5000 spectators for the final game of the series.

5 August 1946 was the second game in the inter state series between New South Wales and Victoria, where Victoria defeated New South Wales 2-1
The goals were scored by
New South Wales – Thorpe; Victoria – Nichol, Massina

7 August 1946 was the third game of the interstate ice hockey series for the Goodall Cup between Victoria and New South Wales held at the St. Moritz Ice Rink. The night saw a record crowd of 5000 spectators fill the venue to watch the thrilling final end in a 2-2 tie.
The goals were scored by
New South Wales – Jim Brown, F. Terger; Victoria – Nichol (2)

The proprietors of the St. Moritz rink granted ice time to the Victorian Ice Hockey Association, free of charge to run a Lightning premiership for 8 B grade teams on 9 July 1954. All proceeds for the matches would go to the hockey association for the betterment and growth of the sport in Victoria.

== See also ==
- List of ice rinks in Australia
