= Malcolm Reid =

Australian businessman (1857–1933) and ongoing furnishing business

Malcolm Donald Reid (11 December 1857 – 16 March 1933) was a South Australian timber merchant and businessman, founder of several furniture stores that bore his name.

== Early life and education ==
Malcolm Donald Reid was born in Adelaide to John Harper Reid (c. 1829 – 25 September 1891) and Bridget Reid, née Carragher (died 1882), who married in 1852. John arrived in the colony of South Australia around 1849, possibly aboard Competitor in October 1848. Bridget may have been one of two servants (with sister Ellen who married Edward Fowler in 1852) who are thought to have arrived on Mary Clarke in July 1849.

He received his secondary education at Port Adelaide Grammar School, when it was run by Allen Martin (after January 1869).

== Career ==
Reid's first job was as a clerk with D. & J. Fowler, then with a local builder, which gave him an insight into the timber business. When the discovery of silver at Broken Hill became known, Reid established a timber business there.

He established a timber business in St Vincent Street, Port Adelaide in late 1882. In March 1884 the business became Russell, Reid & Dickson, selling "Doors, Sashes, and Frames, and every kind of Building Materials", with a steam sawmill located Leadenhall Street. This company, then owned by James Thomas Russell and Reid, was dissolved on 21 March 1887 and Henry Emes taken on as partner in May 1887, as Reid & Emes The firm advertised "the largest and best assorted stock of Tin; Iron, and Enamelled Saucepans in town, at prices that beat the record" in the Barrier Miner in Broken Hill. Emes retired in December 1890.

In October 1891, "Malcolm Reid, Timber and Iron Merchant", advertised the sale of iron and other building materials, citing the head office as Franklin Street, near Adelaide GPO, with offices in Port Adelaide and Broken Hill.

The Advertiser reported in August 1892 that Reid had sold furniture at Broken Hill for the preceding four years, and around February 1892 had leased premises in Rundle Street (at no. 55), Adelaide, to test the market. This had proven so successful that he had leased large premises, formerly occupied by C. Segar on a long lease, "fitted up as a first-class furniture warehouse. The large floor space has been fitted up as a commodious showroom, in which are exhibited the various descriptions of furniture sold by the firm. At the rear are extensive bulk stores, which, with the showrooms before mentioned, form one of the largest and most complete furniture warehouses in Adelaide". These premises were at no. 148, "nearly opposite Fitch's Corner".

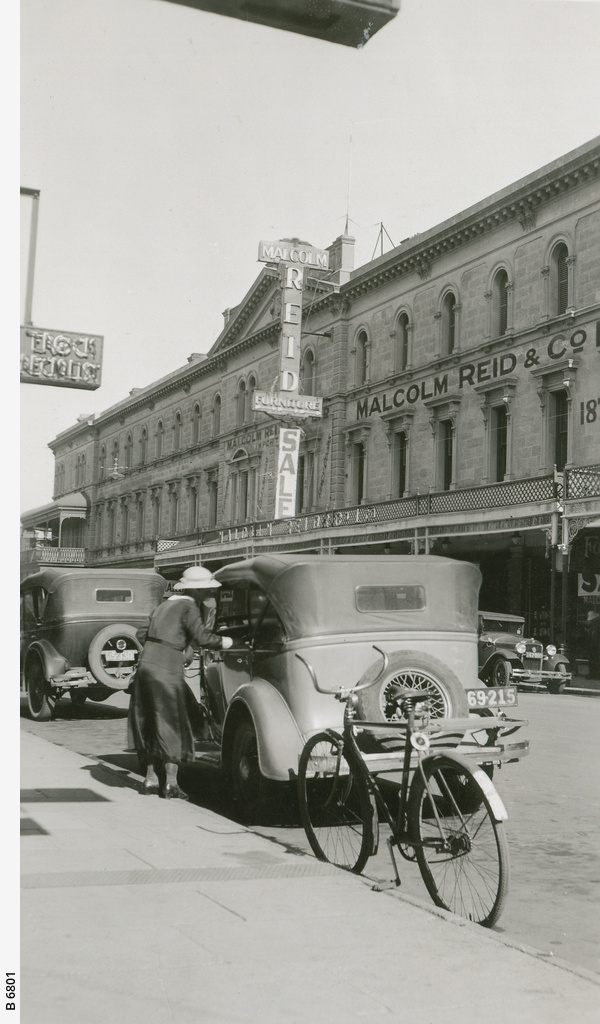
Malcolm Reid building in Rundle St, Adelaide, 1936

In 1902, Reid travelled to Johannesburg, South Africa, and established a timber business there. This business was handed over to his sons to run when he returned to Adelaide, where he established a furnishing business in Rundle Street at nos. 187-195, whose facade is now heritage-listed, with the old Malcolm Reid signage retained.

The business was reformed as a limited company, Malcolm Reid & Co. Ltd. in November 1911; the directors were Malcolm Reid, Sidney Reid, and Thomas Crase. The store had moved to 187 Rundle Street, next to Foy & Gibson, and advertised as drapers, furnishers, and ironmongers. The building had undergone significant renovations before its reopening as Malcolm Reid in September 1909, the original building having been built for the South Australian Company in stages 1880 to 1883 as a complex of 14 shops and an hotel, designed by architect William McMinn. The building was heritage-listed on 5 June 1986.

During the First World War, Reid went to live in England, using his time there to purchase furniture for his business in Adelaide, returning to Australia in 1923. He later travelled to both England and South Africa several times.

== Other activities ==
In 1893, Reid was vice-president of the North Adelaide Patriotic Association.

Reid was elected to the Adelaide City Council for the ward of North Adelaide, serving as an alderman for many years. and was nominated for mayor in 1897, but was beaten by Arthur Ware.

== Honours ==
In 1914, the Freedom of the City of London was bestowed upon Reid.

== Personal life and death ==
Reid married Elizabeth Eleanor Purches in 1880. One of their sons, Reginald Harper "Reg" Reid (1886 – 14 September 1918) served as captain with the 153rd Brigade, Royal Field Artillery, and was killed in action in France. Elizabeth died in Marseille in 1923, and was buried back in Adelaide at Magill Cemetery. Reid married again, and his second wife survived him.

Reid and Elizabeth had a daughter, Rosa, and six other sons: Malcolm Reid (proprietor of the Globe Timber Mills), Harold Reid (Reid Bros.), Sidney Reid (manager for Sir Sidney Kidman), Douglas Reid (Vanderfield & Reid, timber merchants, Sydney), Clifford, and Arnold Reid (Malcolm Reid & Co., Adelaide). Reid's grandson, Donald Malcolm Reid, of Sydney was a grandson (son of Malcolm Jnr of Marrayatville) married Elizabeth Bronner, daughter of Rudolph Bronner.

Reid died at his home in North Adelaide on 16 March 1933, after suffering a year of declining health. He was buried at Magill Cemetery, where his first wife had been buried.

He left an estate worth £181,314. He bequeathed £300 to each of seven charities, and certain legacies to employees, with the rest left to his family.

== Legacy: the company ==
Malcolm Reid & Co. Ltd. opened a store in Bourke Street, Melbourne in 1936.

Their store in King William Street was taken over in 1947 by a new home furnishing company, Reid's Ltd, of which Malcolm Reid & Co. Ltd. owned all ordinary shares. In 1950 a one-for-one issue of bonus shares was made to Malcolm Reid & Co. Ltd., realizing a substantial book profit.

In 1951 a new company, Malcolm Reid and Co. (Vic.) Pty. Ltd., was floated, and purchased the Victorian assets from Malcolm Reid & Co. Ltd.
