= William McMinn =

Australian surveyor and architect (1844–1884)

- Born: 1844; Newry, County Down, Ireland
- Died: 14 February 1884 (aged 39–40); North Adelaide, South Australia
- Occupation: Architect
- Buildings: Mitchell Building, University of Adelaide; Adelaide Children's Hospital; No. 187-207 Rundle Street

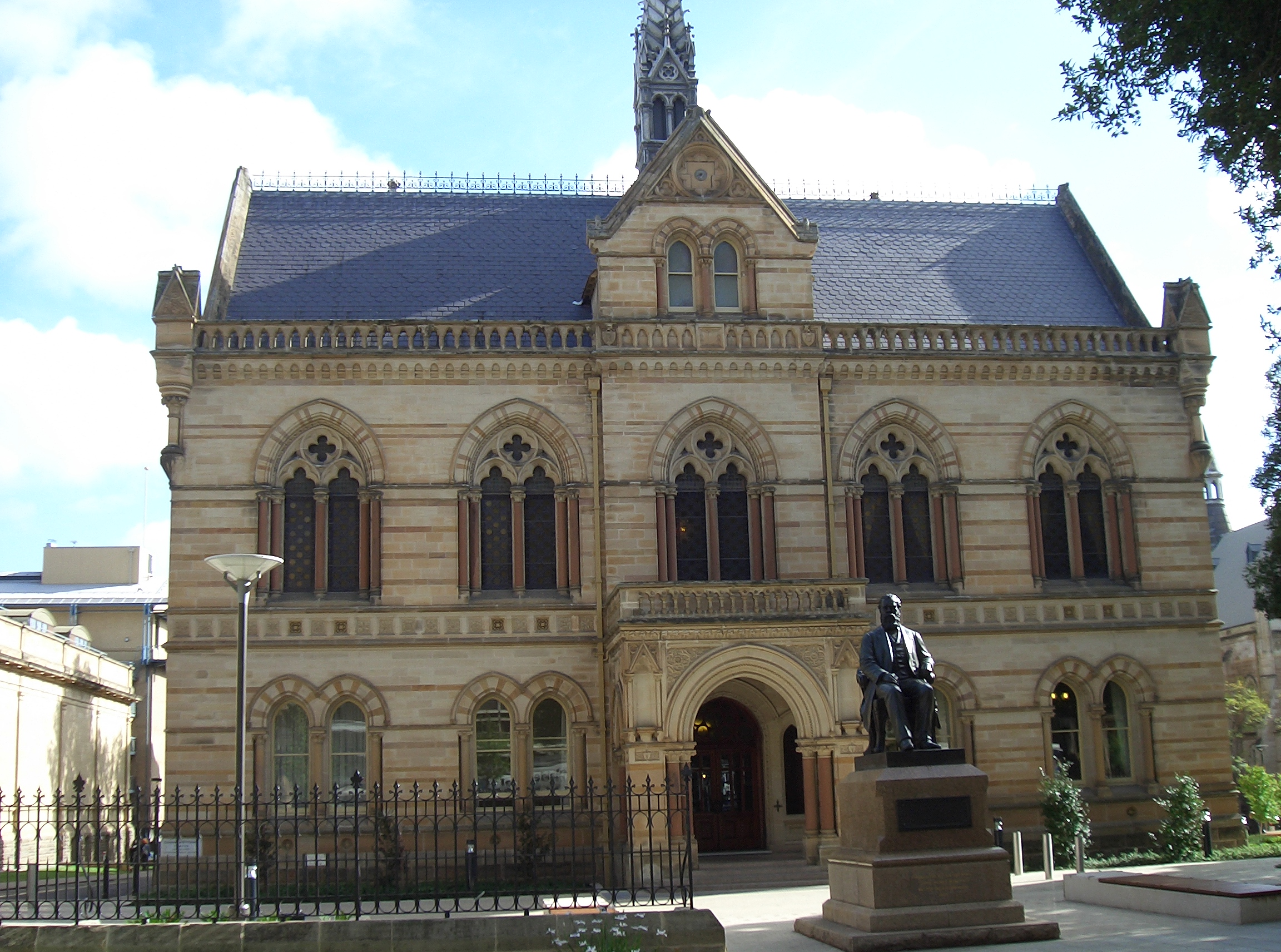
Mitchell Building, University of Adelaide (1878)

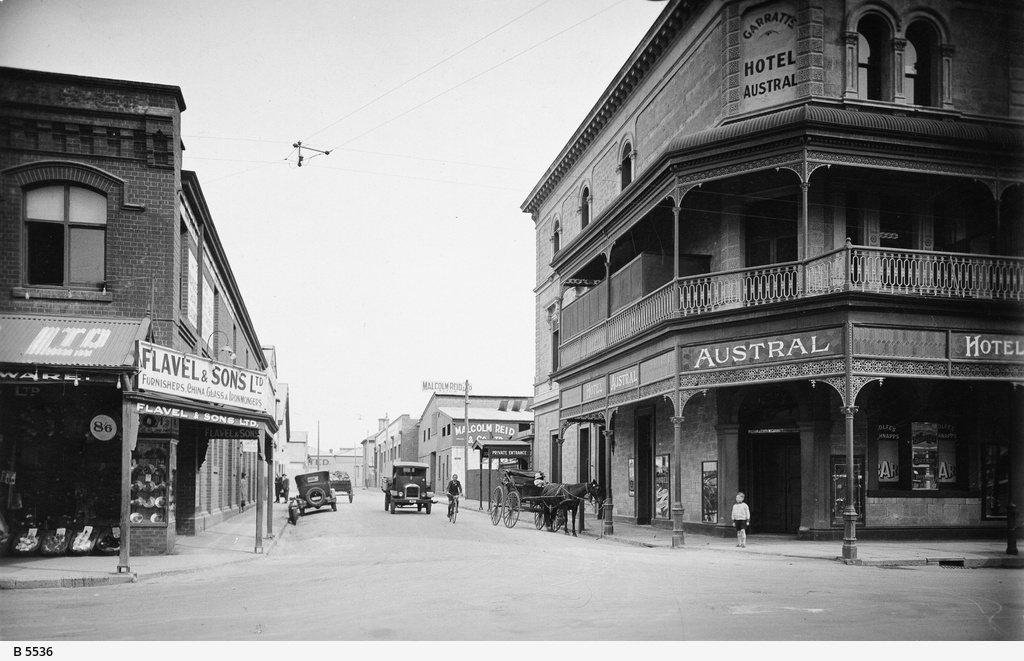
Austral Hotel, cnr Rundle & Bent Streets, 1929

William McMinn (1844 – 14 February 1884) was an Irish-born Australian surveyor and architect, based in Adelaide in the colony of South Australia.

== Early life and education ==
McMinn was born in Newry, County Down, Ireland, in 1844. He was a son of Joseph McMinn and his wife Martha McMinn, née Hamill, who with their large family emigrated to Adelaide on the Albatross, arriving in September 1850. Newspaper reports only mention Mrs McMinn and 8 children aboard Albatross.

No details of his (or his brothers') schooling are known, though it has been asserted that he was taught by one Mr McGeorge of Adelaide, however no teacher of that or similar name has yet come to light. It is likely the youngest children were home-educated, with the boys receiving tuition in drafting and surveying from a tutor.

== Career ==
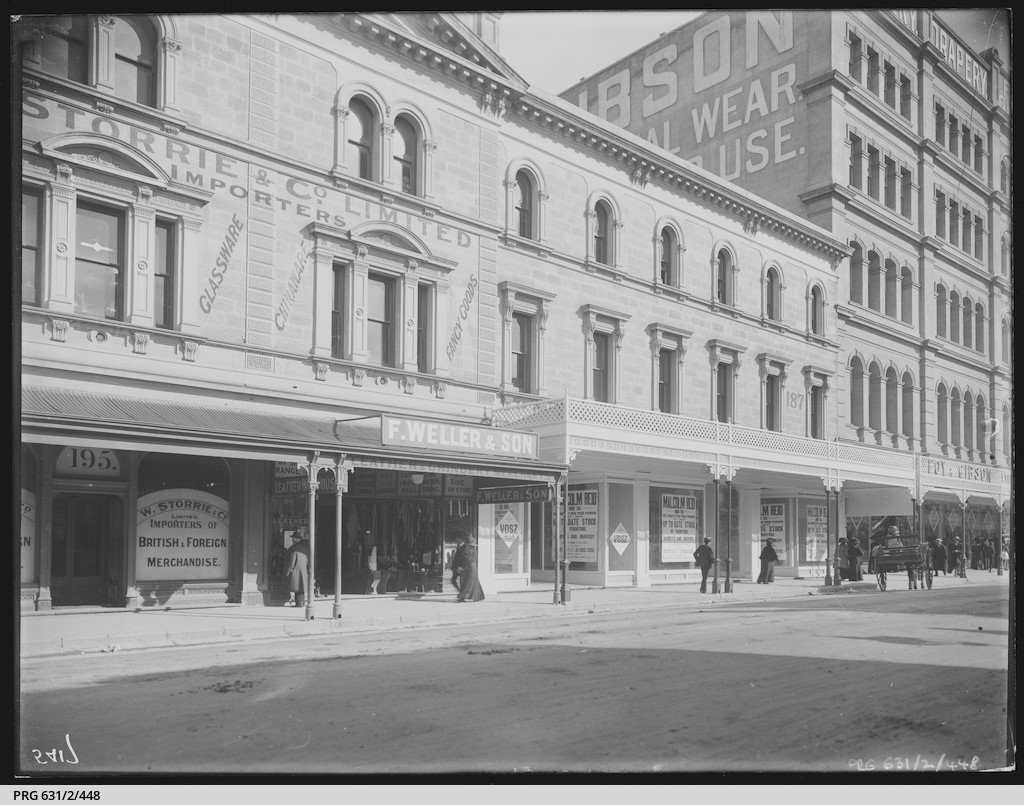
Malcolm Reid & Co, c.1929

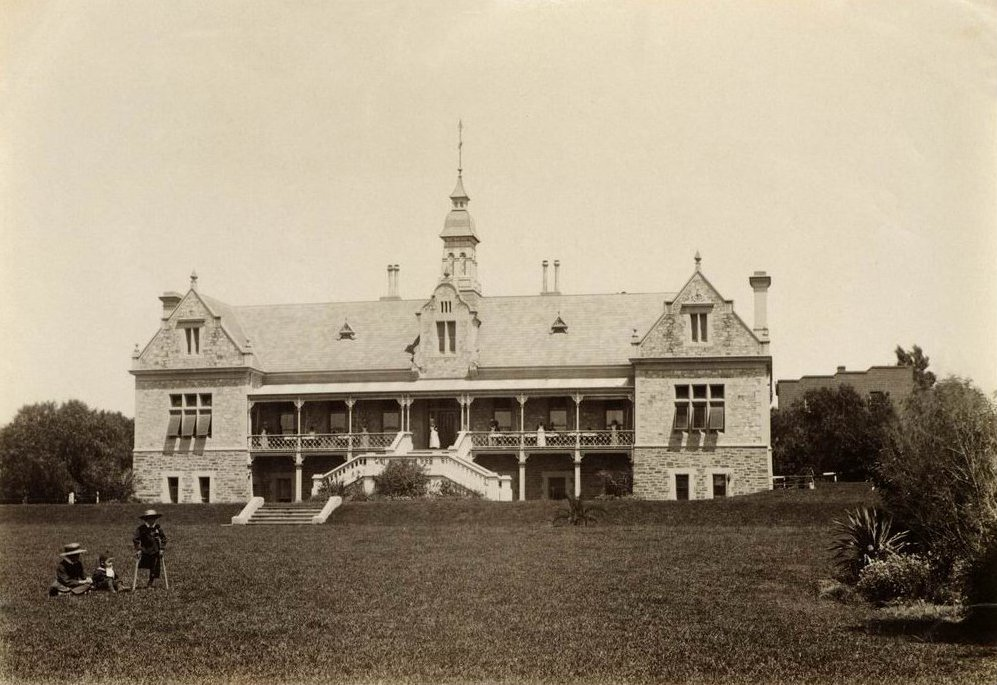
Adelaide Children's Hospital

After completing school, he was articled to the architect James Macgeorge, and was appointed to the Architect-in-Chief's office, but in April 1864 left for employment as a chainman in Boyle Travers Finniss's 1864–65 expedition to Northern Australia surveying the area around Escape Cliffs and the Adelaide River. Following a breakdown of morale in the settlement, McMinn and six others (Stow, Hamilton, Hake, Edwards, White, and Davis, the last two being boatmen) purchased a 23-foot open boat which they dubbed the Forlorn Hope and sailed it 2,000 miles (3,200 km) to Champion Bay, near Geraldton, Western Australia.

McMinn began practising as an architect in 1867, briefly in partnership with Daniel Garlick, and later with some others, but usually independently.

In late 1870 or early 1871 he was appointed as overseer of construction of the Overland Telegraph section from Port Augusta to Darwin, and on 3 May 1871 cancelled the contract tendered by Darwent & Dalwood, they having fallen behind schedule due to heavy rain. Critics of his action pointed out that with the onset of the dry season and better logistics this loss could easily have been made up. The work was put in the hands of engineer R. C. Patterson with instructions to finish the line by early 1872 no matter what the cost. McMinn was dismissed shortly after his return to Adelaide in July 1871, and William T. Dalwood was later awarded compensation of £11,000.

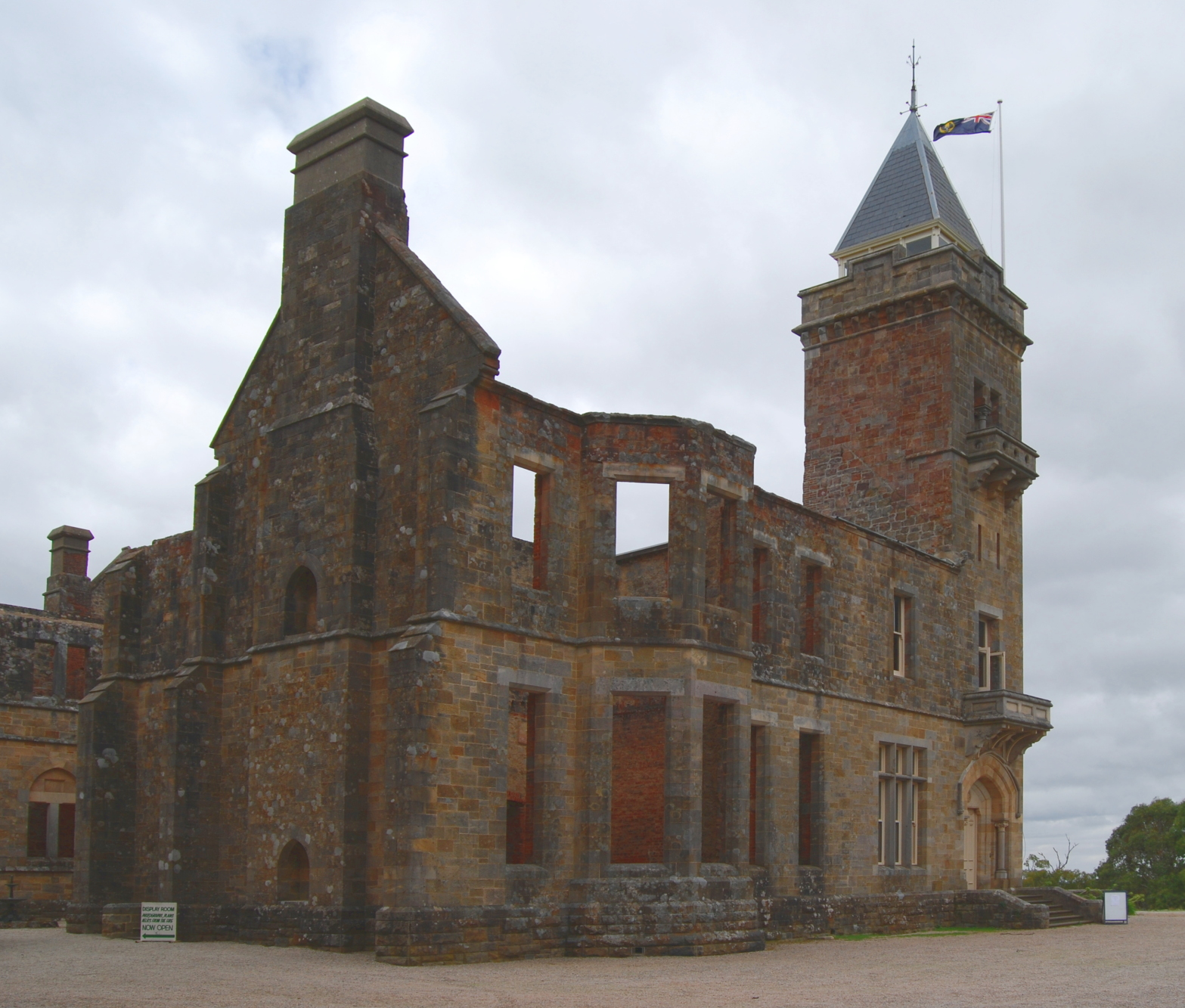
Marble Hill ruin

He designed many grand private residences, but also designed or assisted in the design of many of Adelaide's grand public buildings. Whilst in partnership with Edward John Woods, he designed the original Venetian Gothic building (later designated the Mitchell Building) of the University of Adelaide, considered his greatest work. Completed in 1878, it was the first building of the university.

Also with Woods, he designed the Governor of South Australia's residence at Marble Hill (1878), which was later ruined by fire in 1955. During this period he also designed one of the buildings in Torrens Park, now Scotch College, Adelaide, with Woods.

He designed the original wing of the Adelaide Children's Hospital, and won second place for his design of a bridge over the River Torrens.

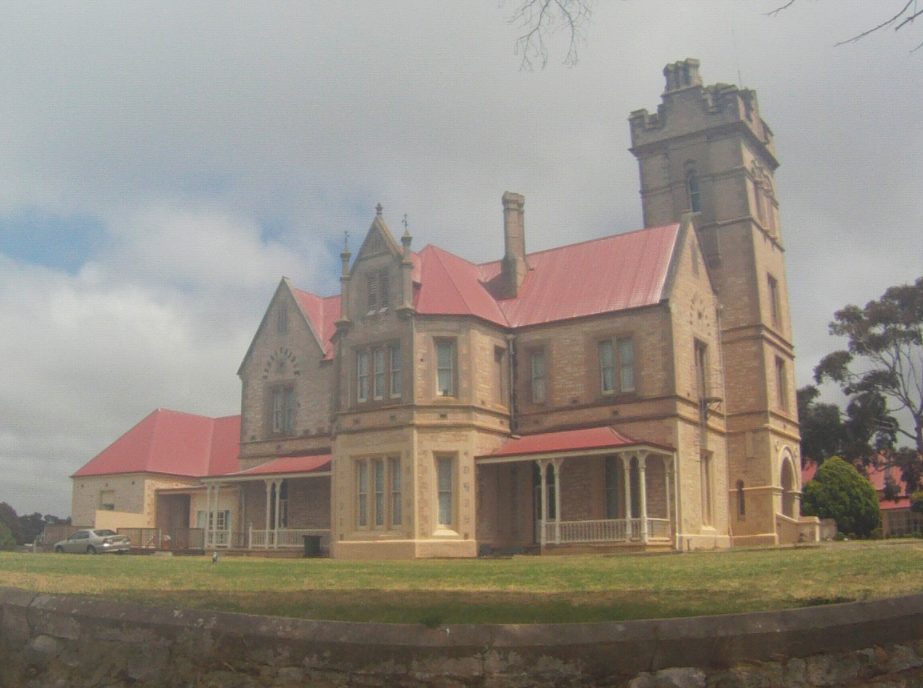
Mount Breckan mansion at Victor Harbor

He built Mount Breckan, home of the Hay Family in Victor Harbor.

During the 1880s, McMinn was commissioned the South Australian Company to design a set of buildings at no. 187-207 Rundle Street, Adelaide. These were built in stages from east to west, and included the Austral Hotel as well the building which later housed Malcolm Reid & Co. Ltd furniture emporium. The first building, comprising 14 shops and a hotel to provide accommodation in the three storeys above, were completed in January 1880. The section later occupied by Malcolm Reid was completed last, around 1883. The completed group occupies almost two town acres, and is unusual in Adelaide in South Australia on account of its extent. The buildings are heritage-listed on the South Australian Heritage Register.

== Later life and death ==
McMinn died in North Adelaide on 14 February 1884.

== As assistant ==
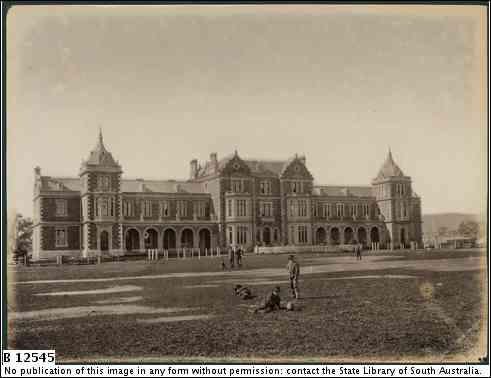
The main building at Prince Alfred College (1867)

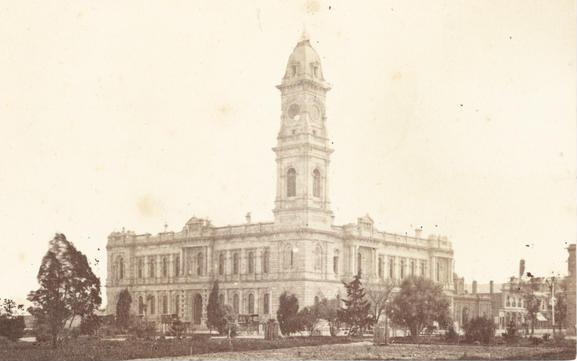
The General Post Office (1867)

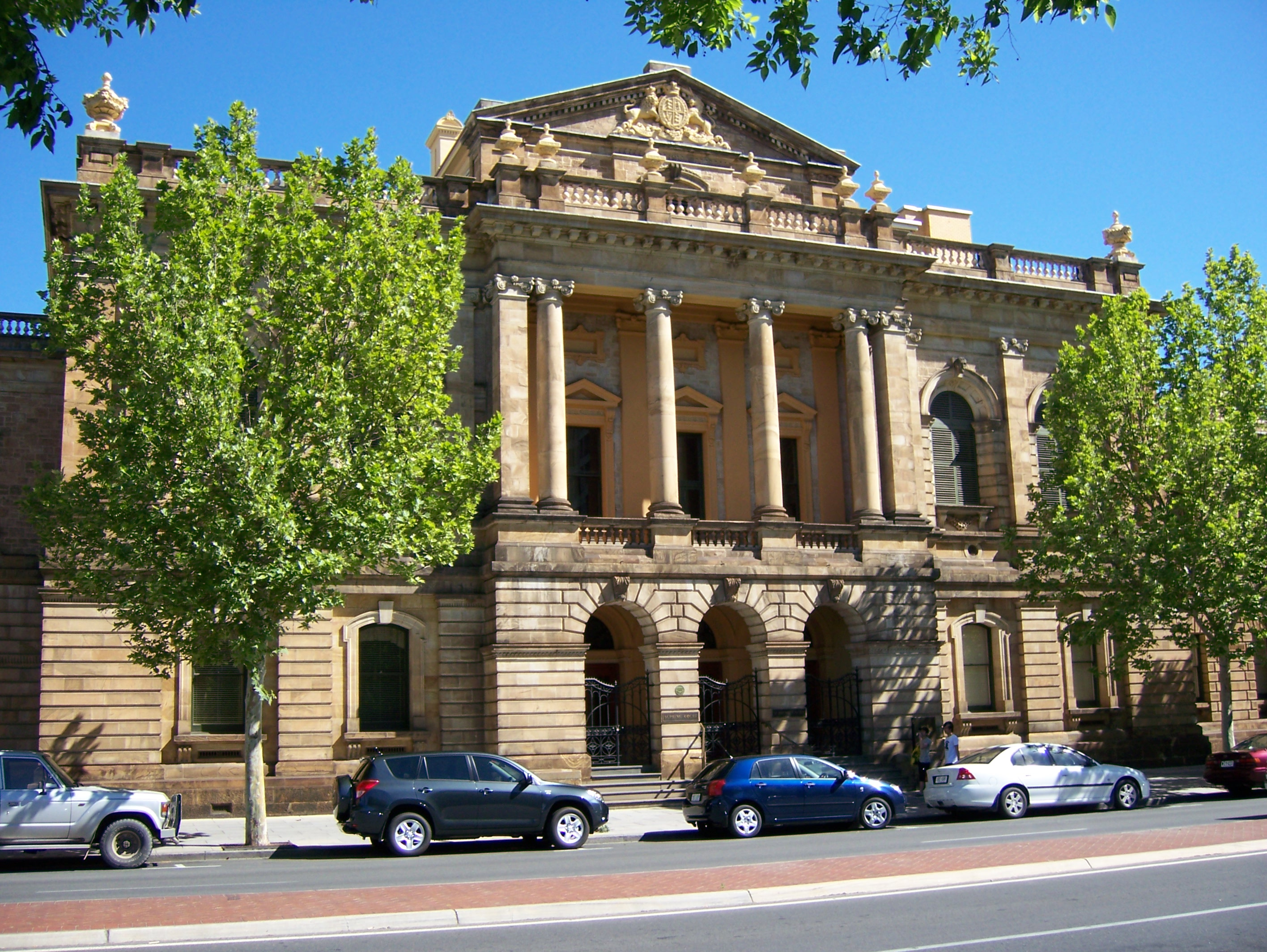
The Supreme Court of South Australia, alterations (1869)

== Family ==
William McMinn married Mary Frances Muirhead (1853–1929) at Glenelg on 14 March 1877; their family included:

- Mary Muirhead McMinn (27 January 1878 – 1957) married Charles Arthur Johns (1871–1956) in 1913
- Eileen Gordon McMinn (1879– ) married Rev. Harvey Langford Ebbs (1914–1987) on 31 August 1904

They had a home "Rutherdale" in Lower Mitcham.

McMinn had five sisters and two brothers in South Australia

- Susanna Draper McMinn (c. 1829 – 2 February 1872) married Luke Michael Cullen ( – c. 25 November 1880), solicitor of Cullen & Wigmore in 1851. He was noted for shady and corrupt practices.
- Mary McMinn (c. 1830 – 6 October 1918) arrived separately in July 1850 aboard Sultana, married William Brewer (c. 1812 – 30 December 1877) in 1857, lived in Kapunda

- Eliza Anna Brewer (died 1918?) married John Rudall (died 1897) in 1864; married James Bray in 1899
- Annie Josephine Brewer (born 1864) married David McIntosh Cameron in 1885
- Mary Hamill Brewer (born 1866) married Mayoh Miller in 1886, lived Avoca Station, New South Wales
- Frank Ernest Brewer (Born 21 Feb 1859) Married (6 June 1882) Rose Jane Hammond (b 26 July 1861), Lived in Adelaide and Fremantle WA

- Jane McMinn (30 September 1831 – c. June 1914) married F. S. (Frederick Simeon) Carus Driffield (c. 1828 – 18 June 1889) on 22 January 1856
- Three unmarried sisters: Sally or Sallie, Martha, and Elizabeth R. "Lizzie" McMinn (c. 1840 – 26 December 1937) ran a small school for girls from the family home, then in February 1884 founded Tormore House School, North Adelaide, which they ran for 13 years. They left for England on 15 December 1897, retiring to "Wolverton Gardens" in Ealing.
- Gilbert Rotherdale McMinn (1841–1924), worked as a surveyor on the Overland Telegraph Line, in February 1871 discovering Simpsons Gap, which proved a better route for the line. He served in various senior public service positions in the Northern Territory. McMinn Street, Darwin is named for him.
- Joseph McMinn (c. 1846 – 9 February 1888) married Charlotte Isabella "Chatty" Wells (1856– ) of Penola, was also a surveyor on the Overland Telegraph, later in charge of Willowie State forest, Wilmington, South Australia, where he died.

- William D'Urney McMinn (1884– ) married Clarice Duck (died 6 May 1938) at Rosedale, Victoria on 15 March 1917 and had a large family
