= Rudolph Bronner =

Rudolph "Rudi" Bronner (27 September 1890 – 17 January 1960) was an Australian executive, National controller of talks for the Australian Broadcasting Commission (later Corporation).

== History ==
Bronner was the second son of Carl or Charles Bronner ( – 26 February 1944) and his first wife Marian or Marion "Marie" Bronner née Schmidhauser (died 10 April 1903).

Charles Bronner was born in Zürich, Switzerland and emigrated to South Australia with his wife in 1877. He joined the Education Department in 1880, taught at Melrose, Teatree Gully and Norwood before matriculating and qualifying for a Teacher's Certificate 1A. He then had charge of schools at Lyndoch and Laura. In 1896 Charles Bronner was appointed headmaster of Goodwood Primary (later Central) School, a post he held, on and off, for a total of 22 years. He married again, on 24 December 1907, to (Frances) May Shaw, née Hussey. Charles had six children by Marian and two by May. Their home for many years was "Helvetia", Victoria Street, Goodwood.

Bronner was born in Lyndoch and educated at St Peter's College and the University of Adelaide, where he graduated BA in 1912, then Balliol College, Oxford, where he read Philosophy and Social Sciences, and befriended Aldous Huxley. While in England he married Pauline Berkeley Bartels, also from Adelaide. He enlisted with the London Rifle Brigade on 26 April 1917 and served in Europe, where he was wounded but able to remain with his unit until cessation of hostilities.

On his return to Adelaide he lectured for the Workers' Educational Association then in 1921 was appointed assistant director of tutorial classes, University of Melbourne. In 1928 he moved to Germany, where at the University of Freiburg he studied under Professor Heussel and lectured as Reader in English, and developed an abiding love of the German language and its literature.

Bronner returned to Adelaide in 1934, and in September 1935 was appointed to the staff of the Australian Broadcasting Commission as assistant controller of talks, which became a National appointment in 1935 and moved to Sydney, where in 1937 he was appointed Federal controller of broadcasts to schools, a function which had previously been State-based.

Bronner retired in 1955 and died after a series of strokes, and was cremated.

== Family ==
Bronner married Pauline Berkeley "Pauli" Bartels (1894– ) in England on 7 April 1917. She was a daughter of Adolph Bartels, Adelaide businessman and mayor. They had one daughter:

- Elizabeth Pauline Berkeley Bronner (1919– ) married Donald Malcolm Reid in Sydney on 6 August 1940. She held a pilot's licence at 18 Donald was a grandson of Adelaide businessman Malcolm Reid."elder son of Mr. and Mrs. Malcolm P. Reid. Marrayatville". Elizabeth and Donald had a daughter in 1943.
