= Flinders (schooner) =

South Australian Government vessel 1865–1873

HM Flinders was a sailing ship, built in 1863 at Brisbane Water as Jenny Cox, purchased in Sydney in 1865 by the South Australian Colonial Government and assigned to the Harbors Board, and completely refitted She was used for

- survey work
- taking up heavy moorings such as those at Port MacDonnell and Port Elliot.
- checking and servicing lighthouses etc.
- transporting staff, supplies and horses to and from Port Darwin
- ceremonial duties

She sprang a leak and sank while moored at Port McDonnell on 29 June 1873 and soon broke up. Only the chronometer and the lives of all aboard were saved.

== Commanders ==
- June 1865 Daniel Murdoch Graham (previously captain of Government tender Blanche)
- December 1865 John Melville (c. 1823 – 14 March 1895) (previously Licensed Pilot, later harbormaster at Port Augusta)
- from early 1867 Colin McLachlan (1843 – 15 February 1920) served as chief officer, appointed commander January 1869
