= 1925 Goodall Cup Finals =

	1	2	3	4	5	6	Total
Victoria	0	1	1	2	4	1	0
New South Wales	7	5	4	5	7	1	5
- * – Denotes overtime period(s)
- Location(s): Melbourne, Victoria: Melbourne Glaciarium; Sydney, Sydney: Sydney Glaciarium
- Format: best-of-six
- Dates: July 11 – July 15, August 8 - August 12

The 1925 Goodall Cup inter-state series is the first year that the tournament was changed from a 3-game series where Victoria and New South Wales would visit each other's state in alternate years, to a 6-game series consisting of 3 matches to be played in Victoria and another 3 matches to be played in Sydney.

The Victorian team left for Sydney on 6 August 1925 to play the remaining 3 matches of the series in the Sydney Glaciarium against the New South Wales team.

== The series ==
Game one

11 July 1925 By the end of the first half, New South Wales led by 1–0. Almost immediately after the second half began, three goals were added in succession to put New South Wales up 4–0. The Victorians were not as accurate with the puck as the New South Wales team which made the evening an easier task for Barnett in the New South Wales goal, while Dow would struggle and was placed in difficult situations throughout the game in the Victorian goal.

Game two

13 July 1925 The crowd was very large for the second game of the series and was attended by the Governor, Earl of Stradbroke.

Game three

15 July 1925 By half time, the score was even 1–1, but New South Wales would have the better of the play, defeating Victoria 4–1.

Game four

8 August 1925 With star goaltender, Billy Dow, missing from the Victorian team and New South Wales missing the services of their high scoring Jimmy Kendall, the teams would contest the 4th game of the series in the Sydney Glaciarium. Pike would open the scoring for New South Wales in the first half, from Turner. He would then add 2 more to increase the New South Wales lead to 3–0. Through the work of goalkeeper Barnett, the Victorians could not score in the first half despite surging attacks. The Victoria team would have more possession of the puck in the 2nd half and Donovan would shoot a puck that glanced off the pads of Barnett and in the net to give Victoria their first goal of the game. Wells would then score the 4th goal for New South Wales from a lucky shot and Raith added their 5th in a scramble. The scramble resulted in Wells being ordered off the ice and almost immediately Kershaw gave Victoria their 2nd goal after gathering the puck from his own back end and running the puck all the way up the ice to score. The bell rang to sound the end of the game and New South Wales had clinched the Goodall Cup by winning the 4th game.

Game five

10 August 1925 Both teams made changes to their roster, New South Wales replaced A. Raith with G. Slade and Victoria played C. Dixson instead of E. A. Collins. New South Wales got on the board early with goals from Pike and Slade. Victoria would return fire with a goal from Kershaw from a great pass by Molony, who would score again to even the game at 2–2. Reid ran through the Victorian center and scored for New South Wales, putting them ahead by one and Pike would score to increase the New South Wales lead to 4–2 at the end of the first half. At the beginning of the second half, Molony found himself out front and gave Victoria their 3rd goal of the evening. New South Wales would score again to regain the 2-goal lead and Molony answered back again for Victoria. Reid scored the 6th goal and Slade put the game beyond doubt with New South Wales finishing with 7 goals.

Game six

12 August 1925 Victoria scored in the first half, and the score remained 1–0 in their favor until there were only a few minutes remaining in the game and N. Turner scored for New South Wales. Both teams drew 1–1.

Game-by-game		Time	Away team	Score	Home team	Scoring summary	Location
1	July 11	9:00	New South Wales	7 - 0	Victoria	NSW - Kendall (3), Pike (3), Turner VIC -	Melbourne Glaciarium
2	July 13	9:00	New South Wales	5 - 1	Victoria	NSW - Kendall (2), Turner (2), Pike VIC - Collins	Melbourne Glaciarium
3	July 15	9:00	New South Wales	4 - 1	Victoria	NSW - Reid, Turner, Slade, White VIC - Molony	Melbourne Glaciarium
4	August 8		Victoria	2 - 5	New South Wales	VIC - Donovan, Kershaw NSW - Pike (3), Wells, Raith	Sydney Glaciarium
5	August 10		Victoria	4 - 7	New South Wales	VIC - Molony (3), Kershaw NSW - Pike (2), Reid (2), Slade (2), Wells	Sydney Glaciarium
6	August 12		Victoria	1 - 1	New South Wales	VIC - NSW - Turner	Sydney Glaciarium
New South Wales win best-of-six series 5 games to 0

== Teams ==
=== Victoria ===
The Victoria team was made from the following players:

- E.J. Molony (Captain)
- E.A. Collins (vice-captain)
- D. Armstrong
- A. de Long
- C. Dixon
- J. Donovan
- John Edwin Goodall
- C. Kershaw
- E. Kinnear
- McKendall

=== New South Wales ===
The New South Wales team was made from the following players:

- L. Reid (captain)
- J.H. Pike (vice-captain)
- J. Barnett (goalkeeper)
- N. Turner
- T. Wells
- A. Raith
- F. White
- J. Kerr

== See also ==
- Goodall Cup
- Ice Hockey Australia
- Australian Ice Hockey League
