= Ice hockey in Australia =

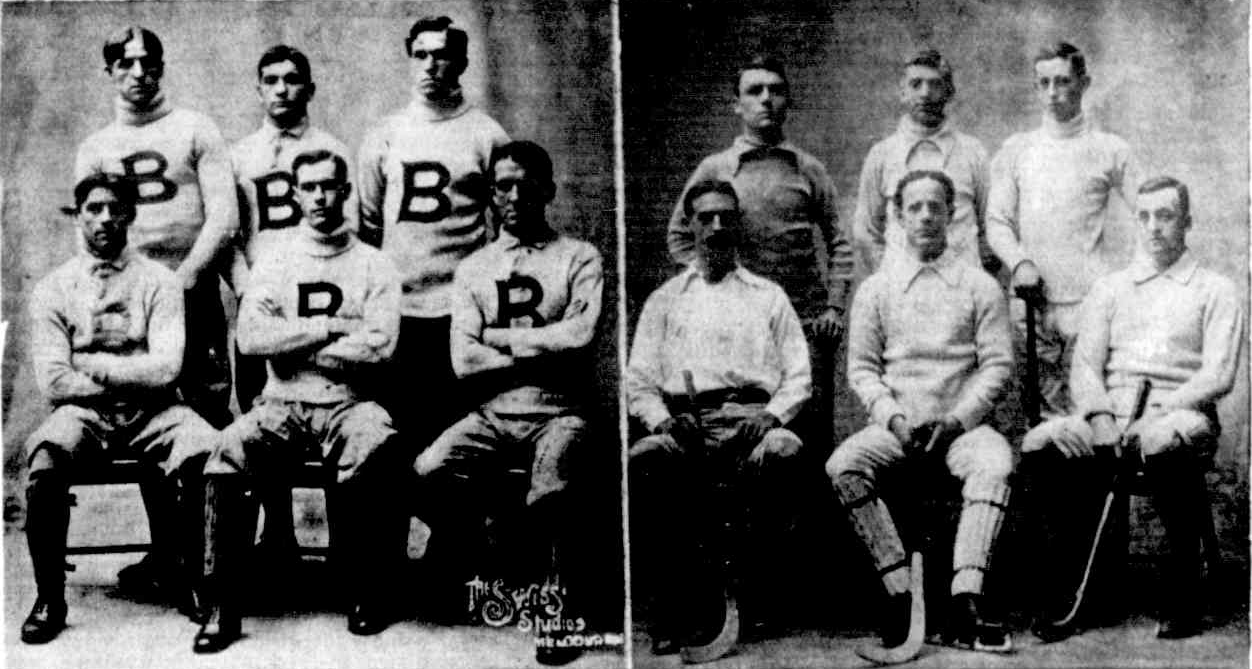
- The two teams who participated in the first ice hockey match in Australia, 17 July 1906
- Country: Australia
- Governing body: Ice Hockey Australia
- National teams: Men's national team; Women's national team

National competitions
- Australian Ice Hockey League

International competitions
- IIHF World Championships; Winter Olympics

Ice hockey in Australia is a sport which initially had a relatively poor popularity, having low participation and spectator attendance figures when compared with many other sports played in the country.

However in recent years the sports popularity has grown considerably with local crowds and interest growing considerably.

The establishment of the semi-professional Australian Ice Hockey League (AIHL) in 2000 (in place of the collapsed former state-based national competition) has seen an increase in popularity for the sport, a trend which continued in 2012 with the successful expansion of the league into Western Australia with the inclusion of Perth-based side Perth Thunder and the introduction of a two-conference competition.

The AIHL is the top-level ice hockey league in Australia, and the largest league in the Southern Hemisphere. The Australian Women's Ice Hockey League (AWIHL) is the top-level women's competition and was formed in 2005.

Ice hockey in Australia is governed nationally by the Australian Ice Hockey Federation (currently trading as Ice Hockey Australia), formed in 1923 as the Australian Ice Hockey Association. Australia is an active full-member of the International Ice Hockey Federation having been admitted to the federation in 1938.

As of 2012 there were approximately 3,200 registered ice hockey players in Australia.

In recent times, ice hockey has surged in popularity in Australia, with the AIHL drawing larger crowds with many selling out.

== History ==
=== Ice Polo: Before Ice Hockey ===
The beginnings of ice sports in Australia are traced back to the evening of 12 October 1904, during a carnival held at the Adelaide Glaciarium, the first ice rink built in Australia.

This important location for Australian ice sports began as a Cyclorama, which opened on 28 November 1890, at 89 Hindley Street, Adelaide. On the evening of 6 September 1904, the building was reopened after being remodeled by a new group called the Ice Palace Skating Company, owned by H. Newman Reid and referred to as the Glaciarium or Ice Palace Skating Rink.

On the evening of 12 October 1904, a match for what was called "hockey on the ice" was held during the carnival at the Adelaide Glaciarium. This game was not ice hockey, it was an adaption of roller polo to the ice using ice skates instead of roller skates.

At the time this version of roller polo adapted to the ice was being played in Adelaide, ice hockey was already a well established sport and had been codified for almost 30 years. Though it was being called "hockey on the ice", it was not ice hockey.

=== The first ice hockey match ===
The beginnings of ice sports in Australia can be linked to the Glaciarium in Adelaide but the birthplace of ice hockey in Australia was in Melbourne, Victoria, and was the first time ice hockey had been played. Organised games of ice hockey in Australia began with the opening of the Melbourne Glaciarium on the afternoon of 9 June 1906, at 16 City Road, South Melbourne Victoria.

The first recorded organised game of ice hockey in Australia was on 17 July 1906, and was between a Victorian representative team and the American sailors from the visiting American Warship the USS Baltimore. This game was held in the Melbourne Glaciarium, the Australian team were dressed in all white and the team from USS Baltimore wore white shirts with a large upper case black B on the front and center of the chest and grey trousers. The skill level of the Australians was not seen to be up to the level of the Americans but the game was hard fought and result of the game was a 1–1 tie.

Team	Player Name
Australia	Herbert John Blatchly (captain)
Australia	Dunbar Poole
Australia	C. Kelly
Australia	James Service Thonemann
Australia	Gordon David Langridge
Australia	Ramsay Salmon
America (USS Baltimore)	F. G. Randell (captain)
America (USS Baltimore)	R. Stirling
America (USS Baltimore)	Percival Howard Miller
America (USS Baltimore)	J. Benditti
America (USS Baltimore)	D. F. Kelly
America (USS Baltimore)	J. T. Connolly

In 1909 state teams from Victoria and New South Wales first contested the Goodall Cup, which has since served continuously as the trophy awarded to the winners of the annual national competition (with hiatuses for the two World Wars, the closure of the Sydney Glaciarium in the late 1950s and for a single year in 1993), thus making the Goodall Cup the third-oldest still awarded ice hockey trophy in the world, and the oldest outside of Canada.

== Organisation ==
Ice Hockey Australia has seven state and territory-based affiliate associations across Australia which are in turn responsible for the organisation of the sport at the state and territory level.

== International competition ==
Australia's performance in international competition has been ordinary, qualifying for the Winter Olympic Games only once in 1960. As of 2012 the men's national team is ranked 32nd in the International Ice Hockey Federation's rankings; the women's national team is ranked 24th. 2012 saw the inaugural Trans-Tasman Champions League games between the previous season's two top-ranked sides from both the Australian Ice Hockey League and the New Zealand Ice Hockey League.

== Australian Ice Hockey League ==
The Australian Ice Hockey League was formed in 2000. From 2000-2001 the Sydney Bears, Adelaide Avalanche and Canberra Knights played round robins. Avalanche won the 2000 and 2001 AIHL Cup.

In 2002 the addition of Melbourne Ice, West Sydney Ice Dogs and the Newcastle North Stars made the league more purposeful.

The Bears won in 2002, the North Stars in 2003 and the Ice Dogs in 2004 with the introduction of a new finals method. The top four would play in sudden death semi-finals and then the two winners would play for the AIHL Championship. This has remained unchanged.

2005 saw the introduction of two new teams: The Central Coast Rhinos and the Brisbane Bluetongues. The North Stars took the cup in 2005.

In 2008 Adelaide Avalanche changed to the Adelaide Adrenaline because of managing purposes. Newcastle won 2006, the Bears in 2007 and the Stars again in 2008.

2009 saw the Bluetingues changing to the Gold Coast Blue Tongues and the Rhinos withdrawing the competition because of AIHL's licensing changes. 2009's cup was taken by the Adrenaline and 2010 was taken by the Ice in Melbourne's new Olympic Training Facility in Melbourne's Docklands.

In 2011 the Mustangs Ice Hockey Club joined the league making it an eight teamed competition. Their home rink is also at the Docklands.

The Perth Thunder joined the AIHL at the start of 2012 as the ninth team.

== Australian Junior Ice Hockey League ==
The Australian Junior Ice Hockey League (AJIHL) is an elite amateur national ice hockey league in Australia, open to players 20 years of age or younger.
