= 1922 Goodall Cup Finals =

	1	2	3	Total
Victoria	4	3	1	2
New South Wales	1	0	1	0
- * – Denotes overtime period(s)
- Location(s): Melbourne, Victoria: Melbourne Glaciarium
- Format: best-of-three
- Coaches: Victoria: New South Wales: Jim Kendall
- Dates: July 22 – July 26
- Series-winning goal: Victor Langsford

The 1922 Goodall Cup Final is the return of the series to Melbourne after the Great War. A ladies ice hockey team was also formed to represent New South Wales and would travel to Melbourne to play a Victorian ladies Ice Hockey team for the first interstate ladies ice hockey competition. This would later be a ladies inter-state competition for the Gower Cup.

== The series ==
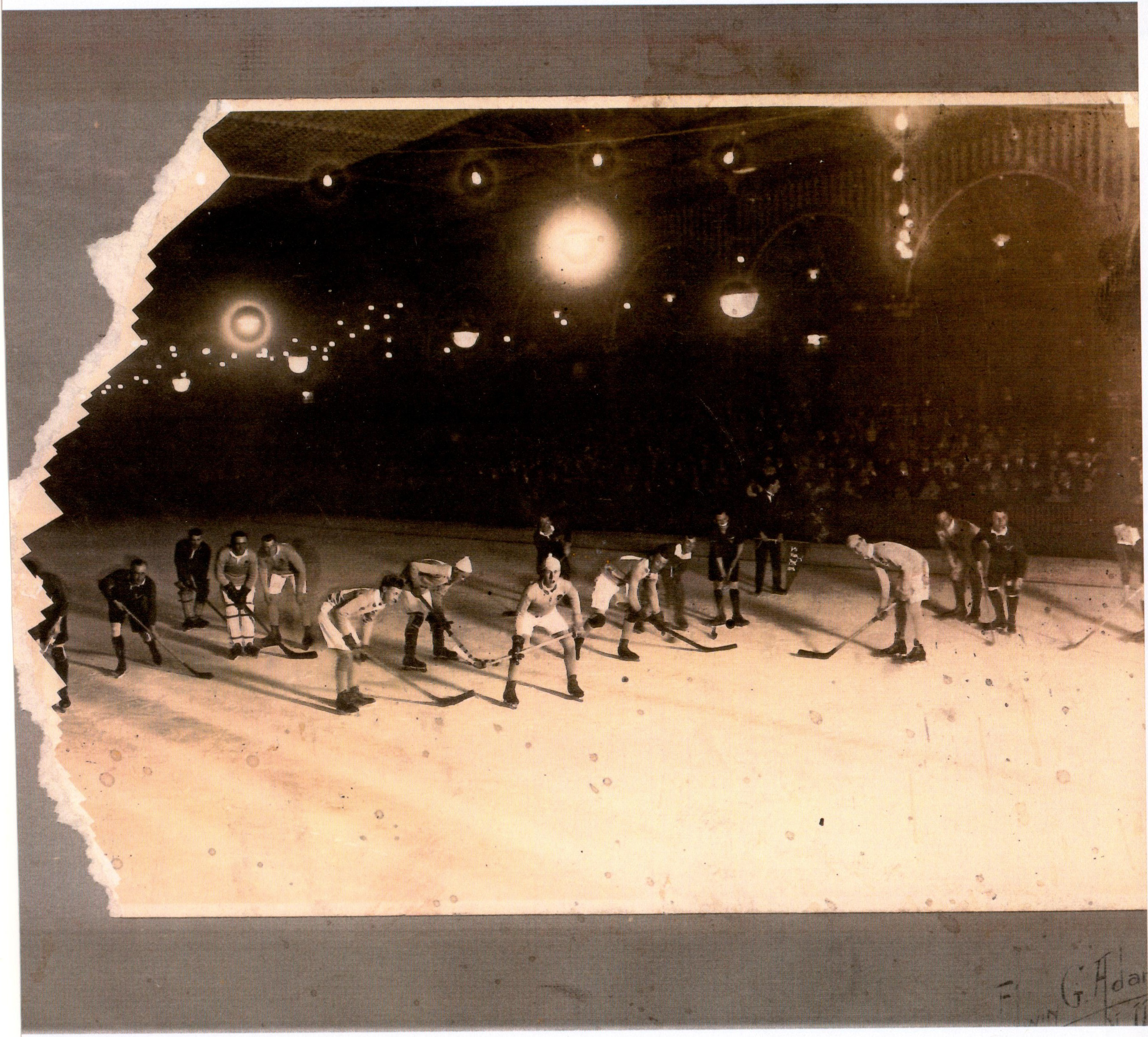
1922 Inter-state ice hockey game in progress

Game one

22 July 1922 Victoria was up 2–0 by the end of the first half of the game. The majority of the play was around the New South Wales goals and from in close Ernest Collins scored the first 3 goals for Victoria. New South Wales then scored a goal back when C, Gates scored from the center line. Maurice Bilsborrow would then go on to score on a rush from center to give the Victorians a 4–1 victory over New South Wales in front of the large crowd at the Melbourne Glaciarium.

Game two

24 July 1922 By the end of the first half, the goal scored by Victor Langsford saw the Victorians leading New South Wales by a score of 1–0. Early in the second period Victor Langsford scored again for Victoria and quickly after Ernest Collins scored again to see the Victorians up by 3–0. New South Wales could not break through the Victorian defence and the remained scoreless. Victoria secured the series by winning the second game and the founder of the Goodall Cup, John Edwin Goodall captained the first Victorian team to win the cup since the great war.

Game three

26 July 1922 The third game saw Victoria open the scoring in the first half. New South Wales scored to even the score at 1-1 and that is how the game ended. With Victoria winning the first 2 games the Goodall Cup was already won and presented to the team.

Game-by-game		Winning team	Score	Losing team	Scoring summary	Location
1	July 22	Victoria	4-1	New South Wales	VIC – E.A. Collins (3), M. Bilsborrow NSW – C. Gates	Melbourne Glaciarium
2	July 24	Victoria	3-0	New South Wales	VIC – V. Langsford (2), E.A. Collins	Melbourne Glaciarium
3	July 26	Victoria	1-1	New South Wales	VIC – NSW -	Melbourne Glaciarium
Victoria win best-of-three series 2 games to 0						Melbourne Glaciarium

== Teams ==
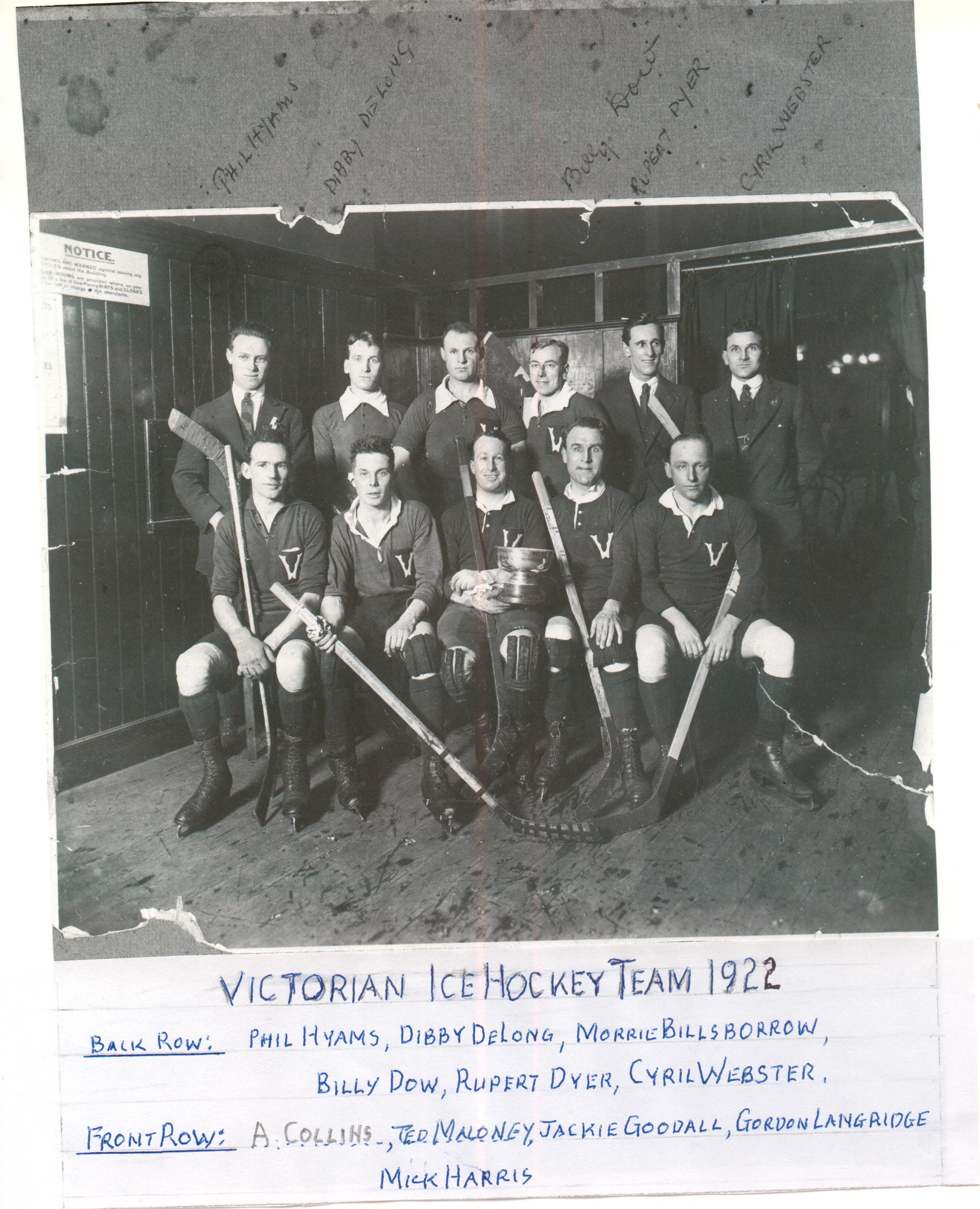
1922 Goodall Cup Champions – Victoria

=== Victoria ===
The Victoria team was made from the following players:

- John Edwin Goodall (Captain)
- Maurice Stephen Bilsborrow
- Gordon Langridge
- Ted Molony
- Ernest Arthur Collins
- Ray Alexander
- Victor Langsford
- Mick Harris
- William Dow
- Anthony De Long (Goaltender)

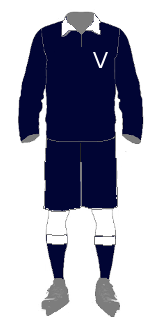
The uniform for Victoria 1922

=== New South Wales ===
The New South Wales team was made from the following players:

- Jack Pike (Captain)
- T. Gibson
- C. Kerr
- H. Butler
- Leslie Reid
- F. Joseph
- C. Gates
- H. Ive (Goaltender)

Team Manager – H. Joseph

== See also ==
- Goodall Cup
- Ice Hockey Australia
- Australian Ice Hockey League
