= 1921 Goodall Cup Finals =

	1	2	3	Total
Victoria	1	2	1	0
New South Wales	6	7	3	3
- * – Denotes overtime period(s)
- Location(s): Sydney, New South Wales: Sydney Glaciarium
- Format: best-of-three
- Coaches: Victoria: New South Wales: Jim Kendall
- Dates: July 25 – July 30

The 1921 Goodall Cup Final was the first Goodall Cup series after the end of the First World War.

== The series ==
Game one

25 July 1921 With three players out of the line up due to influenza, Victoria quickly fell to New South Wales with only 1 goal to their 6.

Game two

27 July 1921 the second game of the series was easily won by New South Wales, defeating Victoria by a score of 7-2.

Game three

30 July 1921 New South Wales swept the visiting team Victoria in the interstate series by winning the 3rd and final game by a score of 3-1 in front of 2000 spectators. Victoria would score in the second half of the game but New South Wales returned by scoring 3 more to defeat Victoria for the third straight game by a score of 6-1.

Game-by-game		Winning team	Score	Losing team	Scoring summary	Location
1	July 25	New South Wales	6-1	Victoria	NSW - J. Kendall (3), J. Pike (2), K. Poulton VIC - V. Langsford	Sydney Glaciarium
2	July 27	New South Wales	7-2	Victoria	NSW - J. Pike (5), L. Reid (2) VIC - G. Langridge (2)	Sydney Glaciarium
3	July 30	New South Wales	3-1	Victoria	NSW - J. Pike (2), K. Poulton VIC - G. Langridge	Sydney Glaciarium
New South Wales win best-of-three series 3 games to 0						Sydney Glaciarium

== Teams ==
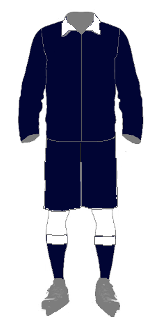
The uniform for Victoria 1921

=== Victoria ===
The Victoria team was made from the following players

- Gordon Langridge (Captain)
- John Edwin Goodall (Vice Captain)
- R. Marks
- Andrew Reid
- Mitch Harris
- Ray Alexander
- Ted Molonoy
- W. Watkins
- Victor Langsford
- L. W. Roche
- Cliff Webster (Goaltender)

=== New South Wales ===
The New South Wales team was made from the following players

- Jack Pike (Captain)
- Leslie Reid (Vice Captain)
- Jim Kendall
- T. Gibson
- K. Poulton
- H. Ive
- C. Gates
- J. Lowick
- C. Kerr (Goaltender)

=== Goal Umpires ===
J. Duff and T. Reynolds

== Player statistics ==
=== Leading goaltenders ===
The following goaltenders led the interstate championship for goals against average.

Player	Team	GP	W	L	GA	SO	GAA
C Kerr	New South Wales	3	3	0	4	0	1.33
L. W. Roche	Victoria	3	0	3	16	0	5.33

== See also ==
- Goodall Cup
- Ice Hockey Australia
- Australian Ice Hockey League
