= 1912 Goodall Cup Finals =

4th interstate Ice Hockey championship

	1	2	3	Total
Victoria	2	1	1	0
New South Wales	5	3	6	3
- * – Denotes overtime period(s)
- Location(s): Sydney, New South Wales: Sydney Glaciarium
- Format: best-of-three
- Dates: August 23 – August 29

The 1912 Goodall Cup Final marks the fourth inter-state ice hockey championship in Australia and the second of these championships won by New South Wales, the first being won in their home arena.

== The series ==
Practices for the New South Wales state team was announced on 12 August 1912, inviting the following players:

- Jim Kendall
- Les Turnbull
- T. Rowe
- W. Knowles
- Jack Pike
- S. McCarthy
- W. Smith
- Andrew Reid
- C. Deacon

Game one

23 August 1912 by the end of the first half, New South Wales was ahead 4-1. Jim Kendall scored again and increased the lead to 5-1 but the Victorian team scored one back to make the final score 5-2 and the first game of the series was won by New South Wales.

Game two

27 August 1912 the second game of the series was won by New South Wales, defeating Victoria by a score of 3-1.

Game three

29 August 1912 New South Wales was dominating the first half of the game and by the end of the 1st half they were up by a score of 3-0. Victoria would score in the second half of the game but New South Wales returned by scoring 3 more to defeat Victoria for the third straight game by a score of 6-1. Jimmy Kendall, who received a nasty cut to his head early in the game, scored all six goals for New South Wales while Henry "Hal" Newman Reid Jr. scored the lone goal for Victoria.

Game-by-game		Away team	Score	Home team	Scoring summary	Location
1	August 23	Victoria	2-5	New South Wales	VIC - H. Reid, K. Walker NSW - J. Kendall (3), T. Rowe (2)	Sydney Glaciarium
2	August 27	Victoria	1-3	New South Wales	VIC - NSW -	Sydney Glaciarium
3	August 29	Victoria	1-6	New South Wales	VIC - H. Reid NSW - J. Kendall (6)	Sydney Glaciarium
New South Wales win best-of-three series 3 games to 0						Sydney Glaciarium

== Teams ==
=== Victoria ===
The Victoria team was made from the following players

- Keith Walker (RW)
- Henry "Hal" Newman Reid Jr. (Centre)
- Leslie Reid (LW)
- Dudley Woods
- Andrew Reid
- M. Haig (Goaltender)

=== New South Wales ===
The New South Wales team was made from the following players

- Jim Kendall (Captain)
- Jack Pike (RW)
- F. Rowe (Center)
- W. Knowles (LW)
- Les Turnbull
- C. Deakin (Goaltender)

== Player statistics ==
=== Leading goaltenders ===
The following goaltenders led the interstate championship for goals against average.

Player	Team	GP	W	L	GA	SO	GAA
C Deacon	New South Wales	3	3	0	4	0	1.33
M Haig	Victoria	3	0	3	14	0	4.67

== See also ==
- Goodall Cup
- Ice Hockey Australia
- Australian Ice Hockey League
