= 1929 Goodall Cup Finals =

	1	2	3	Total
Victoria	0	2	2	1
New South Wales	4	5	0	2
- * – Denotes overtime period(s)
- Location(s): Sydney, New South Wales: Sydney Glaciarium
- Format: best-of-three
- Dates: August 10 – August 14
- Series-winning goal: K. Raith

The 1929 Goodall Cup Finals began on Saturday, 10 August 1929. Prior to the finals, New South Wales had retained the Goodall Cup since 1923.

== The series ==
Game one

The first game of the 1929 interstate ice hockey series occurred on August 10, 1929. The event was described as a one-sided affair because New South Wales defeated Victoria 4-0. Norman Turner scored two goals, James Archibald Brown scored one, and K. Raith scored one.

Game two

The second game of the series began at 8:00 PM on 12 August 1929. New South Wales defeated Victoria 5-2, and was described as being too fast for the Victorian team. K. Raith scored three goals, and players Jim Brown and Norman Turner also scored for New South Wales. Victoria scored twice, with B. Cullen and E. Molony providing the goals.

Game three

On August 14, 1929, Victoria defeated New South Wales with a score of 2-0, with players Kershaw and B. Cullen scoring points. However, New South Wales had already claimed the Goodall Cup in the second game.

Game-by-game		Away team	Score	Home team	Scoring summary	Location
1	August 10	Victoria	0-4	New South Wales	NSW - N. Turner (2), Brown, K. Raith	Sydney Glaciarium
2	August 12	Victoria	2-5	New South Wales	VIC - B. Cullen, E. Molony NSW - K. Raith (3), J. Brown, N. Turner	Sydney Glaciarium
3	August 14	Victoria	2-0	New South Wales	VIC - Kershaw, B. Cullen	Sydney Glaciarium
New South Wales win best-of-three series 2 games to 1						Sydney Glaciarium

== Teams ==
=== Victoria ===
The Victoria team was made up of the following players

- Ted Molony (Forward) (Captain)
- B. Cullen (Forward)
- Davidson (Forward)
- Fox (Forward)
- Kershaw (Defense)
- C.M. Napthine (Defense)
- Donovan (Defense)
- Darke (Goaltender)

=== New South Wales ===
The New South Wales team was made up of the following players

- Norman Turner (Captain)
- James Archibald Brown
- K. Raith
- A. Raith
- F. White
- J. Barnett
- J. Kerr
- T. Gallecher

== See also ==
- Goodall Cup
- Ice Hockey Australia
- Australian Ice Hockey League
