= 1947 Goodall Cup Finals =

| | 1 | 2 | 3 | Total |
|---|---|---|---|---|
| Victoria | 3 | 3 | 1 | 2 |
| New South Wales | 1 | 1 | 6 | 1 |
- * – Denotes overtime period(s)
- Location(s): Sydney, Sydney: Sydney Glaciarium
- Format: best-of-three
- Dates: July 26 – July 31, August 8 - August 12
- Series-winning goal: R. Jones

The 1947 Goodall Cup was the 26th year that the Australian inter-state ice hockey 3 game series was played. Victoria won the Cup for the first time in 25 years.

== The series ==
Game one

26 July 1947 In front of a packed Sydney Glaciarium the first game was won by Victoria. J. McLauchlan scored for New South Wales in the last minutes of the game.

Game two

29 July 1947 Victoria won the 2nd game of the inter-state series and secured the Goodall Cup. Victoria opened with a 2 - 0 lead in the first period with a goal by A. Sengotti and R. Jones. In the second period, New South Wales reduced the lead when G. Thorn scored. In the third period, E. Winter scored for Victoria.

Game three

31 July 1947 In the third game of the series, New South Wales completely outplayed Victoria and won the game 6 - 1. The first two games had been won by Victoria so the Goodall Cup had already been won.

| Game-by-game | | Time | Away team | Score | Home team | Scoring summary | Location |
|---|---|---|---|---|---|---|---|
| 1 | July 26 | | Victoria | 3 - 1 | New South Wales | VIC - A. Sengotti, R. Jones, D. Cunningham NSW - J. McLauchlan | Sydney Glaciarium |
| 2 | July 29 | | Victoria | 3 - 1 | New South Wales | VIC - A. Sengotti, R. Jones, E. Winter NSW - G. Thorn | Sydney Glaciarium |
| 3 | July 31 | | Victoria | 1 - 6 | New South Wales | VIC - W. Harrison NSW - | Sydney Glaciarium |
New South Wales win best-of-six series 5 games to 0

== Teams ==
=== Victoria ===
The Victoria team was made from the following players:

Forwards

- A. Sengotta
- E. Winter
- John Tuckerman
- David Cunningham
- R. Sullivan
- Russel Jones
- Noel Derrick

Defence

- John Whyte
- W. Harrison
- C. Mitchell

Goaltender

- Russ Carson

=== New South Wales ===
The New South Wales team was made from the following players:

- S. Green
- Geoff Thorne
- J. McLauchlan
- P. Wendt

== See also ==
- Goodall Cup
- Ice Hockey Australia
- Australian Ice Hockey League
