= 1913 Goodall Cup Finals =

	1	2	3	Total
Victoria	6	5	4	2
New South Wales	2	1	7	1
- * – Denotes overtime period(s)
- Location(s): Melbourne, Victoria: Melbourne Glaciarium
- Format: best-of-three
- Dates: August 13 – August 18
- Series-winning goal: Leslie Reid

The 1913 Goodall Cup Final marks the fifth inter-state ice hockey championship in Australia and the last championship played before the series was suspended due to World War I.

== The series ==
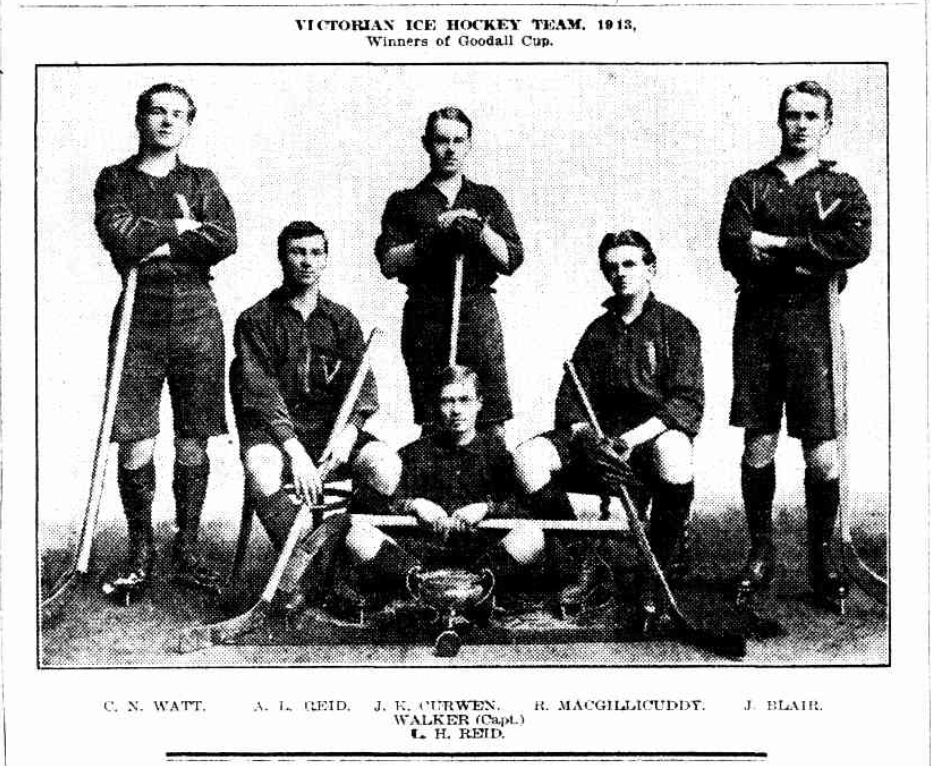
Victoria - Goodall Cup Champions 1913

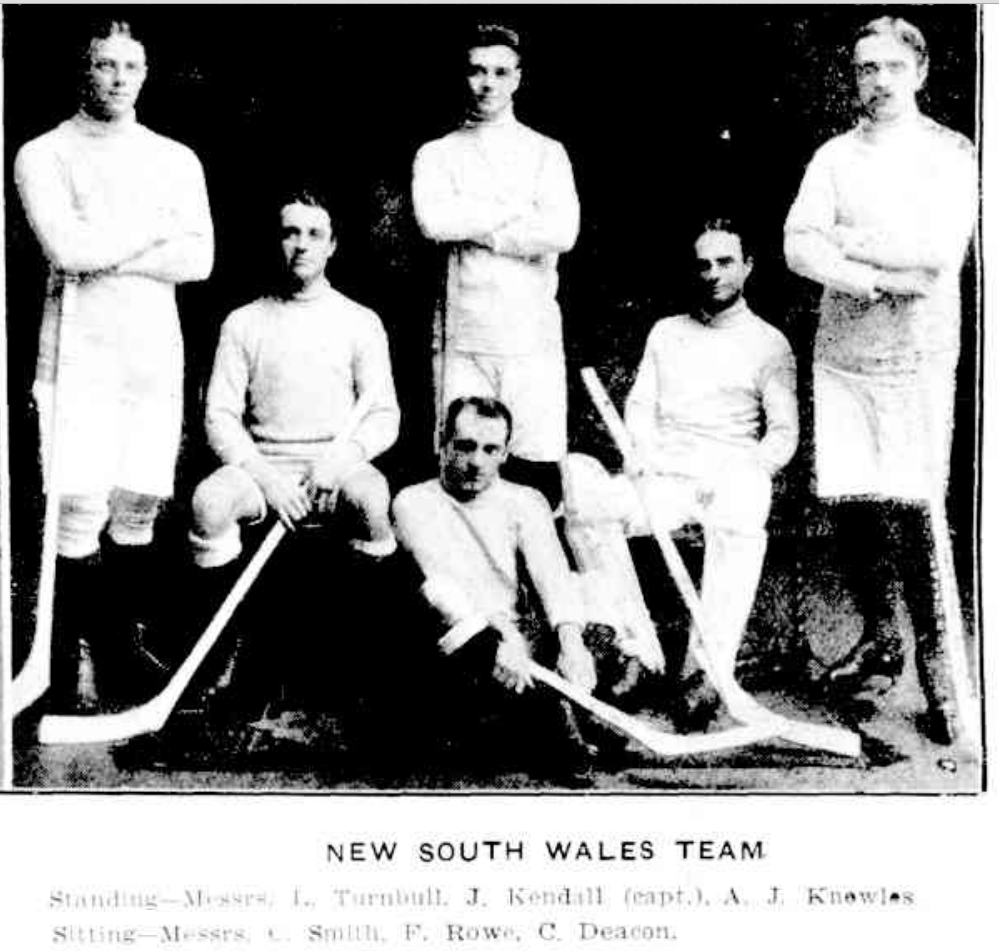
New South Wales - inter-state series 1913

Game one

13 August 1913 Saw the return of the inter-state series to the Melbourne Glaciarium. Victoria and New South Wales were deadlocked at 2-2 by the end of the first half, with Jim Kendall scoring both goals for New South Wales. In the second half they out played New South Wales and scored 4 more goals to win the first game of the series by a score of 6-2.

Game two

15 August 1913 The first half of the game K. Walker opened the scoring for Victoria with a long shot from the right wing. After a lot of give and take action, Leslie Reid raced down the wing to score the second goal for Victoria giving them a 2 - 0 lead. Jim Kendall would loft a shot from the middle of the rink right past the Victorian goaltender to give New South Wales their first goal. By the end of the first half Victoria was up by a score of 2-1 over New South Wales. At the beginning of the second half, Jim Kendall was closely watched by the Victorian team so that he would not get space on the ice. Leslie Reid would get hold of a puck in a tight corner and score the 3rd goal for Victoria. Keith Walker would find a loose puck in front of a large battle in front of the goal and snapped the 4th goal in for Victoria. The fifth goal game from Walker passing the puck to R. McGillicuddy from behind. Victoria would win the game by a score of 5-1 and secure the Goodall Cup. The Victorians would gain the honor of holding the cup until the next season it was to be contested again.

Game three

18 August 1913 New South Wales defeated Victoria by a score of 7-4. Victoria led by 1 goal at the end of the first half but New South Wales would run away with the score in the second half. Due to an ankle injury from the second game of the series, Leslie Reid did not play in this game and W. Macrow was substituted in his place.

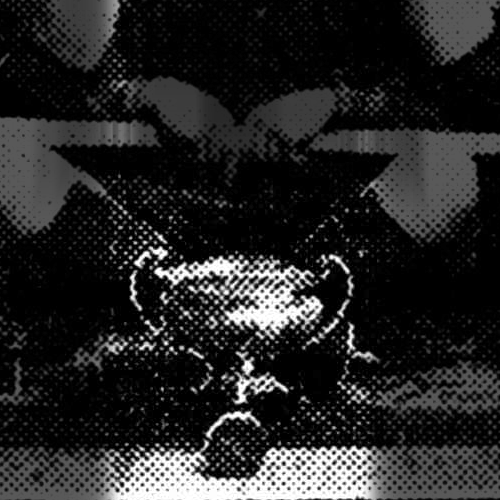
1913 version of the Goodall Cup

Game-by-game		Away team	Score	Home team	Scoring summary	Location
1	August 13	New South Wales	2-6	Victoria	NSW - J. Kendall (2) VIC - K. Walker (2), R. Macgillicuddy (2), L. Reid (2)	Melbourne Glaciarium
2	August 15	New South Wales	1-5	Victoria	NSW - J. Kendall VIC - K. Walker (2), L. Reid (2), R. Macgillicuddy	Melbourne Glaciarium
3	August 18	New South Wales	7-4	Victoria	NSW - F. Rowe (4) VIC - A. Reid (3), K. Walker	Melbourne Glaciarium
Victoria win best-of-three series 3 games to 0						Melbourne Glaciarium

== Teams ==
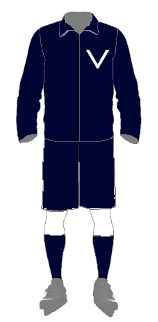
uniform for Victoria 1913

=== Victoria ===
The Victoria team was made from the following players

- Keith Walker (Captain)
- Andrew Lambert Reid
- Leslie Reid
- J. Blair
- Reginald Macgillicuddy
- Charles N. Watt (Goaltender)
- D. F. Woods (emergency)
- W Coates (emergency)
- W. Macrow (emergency)

=== New South Wales ===
The New South Wales team was made from the following players

- Jim Kendall (Captain)
- A. J. Knowles
- C. Smith
- Les Turnbull
- F. Rowe
- L. Marshall
- V. Colls
- C. Deacon (Goaltender)

== Player statistics ==
=== Leading goaltenders ===
The following goaltenders led the interstate championship for goals against average.

Player	Team	GP	W	L	GA	SO	GAA
Charles Watt	Victoria	3	2	1	10	0	-
C Deacon	New South Wales	3	1	2	15	0	-

== See also ==
- Goodall Cup
- Ice Hockey Australia
- Australian Ice Hockey League
