= 1910 Inter-State Series =

	1	2	3	Total
Victoria	4	12	8	3
New South Wales	2	0	0	0
- * – Denotes overtime period(s)
- Location(s): Sydney, New South Wales: Sydney Glaciarium
- Format: best-of-three
- Coaches: Victoria: New South Wales: F. Dixon
- Dates: July 23 – July 29

The 1910 Inter-State Series Final was the second Inter-State Series ice hockey championship in Australia and for the first time was held in the Sydney Glaciarium.

== The series ==
The inter-state ice hockey championship was held between a state representative team from Victoria and from New South Wales. This tournament was a best-of-3 format and saw Victoria win the series 3 games to 0. The first winner of 2 games in the series was often quoted in newspapers as "securing / winning the 'rubber ", which is terminology used in the game of Rubber Bridge where in a best of 3 competition a rubber is awarded to the team that first wins 2 games of the 3. The game itself was played in two halves of 10min each with a break in between.

Game one

23 July 1910 was the first game of the series and was held at the Sydney Glaciarium in front of an enthusiastic crowd of 2000 people. Victoria defeated the New South Wales team by a score of 4-2 with goals being scored by Victorians Andrew Reid (who had 2 goals), Robert Jackson and Dudley Woods. Scoring for New South Wales was done by Jack Pike and Les Turnbull.

Game two

Wednesday 27 July 1910 proved to be a difficult day for New South Wales as Victoria overwhelmed them by a score of 12-0.

Game three

The evening of Friday 29 July 1910 marked the third straight win for Victoria with a convincing 8-0 victory over New South Wales. The goals were scored by Henry "Hal" Newman Reid Jr., who had five goals and his brother Andrew Reid with three goals.

Game-by-game		Away team	Score	Home team	Scoring summary	Location
1	July 23	Victoria	4-2	New South Wales	VIC – A. Reid (2), Jackson, Woods NSW – Pike, Turnbull	Sydney Glaciarium
2	July 27	Victoria	12-0	New South Wales		Sydney Glaciarium
3	July 29	Victoria	8-0	New South Wales	VIC – H. Reid (5), A. Reid (3)	Sydney Glaciarium
Victoria win best-of-three series 3 games to 0						Sydney Glaciarium

== Teams ==
=== Victoria ===
The Victoria team was made from the following players

- E. C. Walker (Captain)
- Andrew Reid (Vice Captain)
- J. Blair
- Robert Jackson
- Dudley Woods
- Cyril Macgillicuddy (Goaltender)

Emergency list

- Henry "Hal" Newman Reid Jr.
- E. Menzies
- S. Keast

Manager

- R. Whiteford

=== New South Wales ===
The New South Wales team was made from the following players

- Les Turnbull (Captain) (forward)
- Jack Pike (forward)
- Arthur Cuthbertson (forward)
- Cyril Lane (Back)
- Dunbar Poole (Vice Captain) (back)
- Graham (Goaltender)

Emergency list

- Rowe
- Bray
- Knowles
- Swannel
- Allport
- Fowler

== Player statistics ==
=== Scoring leaders ===
The following players led the interstate championship for points.

Player	Team	GP	G	A	Pts
Henry Newman Reid Jr.	Victoria	3	5	0	5
Andrew Lambert Reid	Victoria	3	4	0	4
Robert Edward Jackson	Victoria	3	1	0	1
Dudley Woods	Victoria	3	1	0	1
Jack Pike	New South Wales	3	1	0	1
Les Turnbull	New South Wales	3	1	0	1
Keith Curwen Walker	Victoria	3	0	0	0
Dunbar Poole	New South Wales	3	0	0	0
Arthur Cuthbertson	New South Wales	3	0	0	0
Cyril Lane	New South Wales	3	0	0	0

=== Leading goaltenders ===
The following goaltenders led the interstate championship for goals against average.

Player	Team	GP	W	L	GA	SO	GAA
Cyril Macgillicuddy	Victoria	3	3	0	2	2	0.67
. Graham	New South Wales	3	1	3	24	0	8.00

== See also ==
- Goodall Cup
- Ice Hockey Australia
- Australian Ice Hockey League
