= Arthur Cuthbertson (ice hockey) =

Australian ice hockey player (1888–1925)

Personal information
- Nationality: Australian
- Born: 1888 Sydney
- Died: 1925 (aged 36–37) London

Sport
- Country: Australia
- Sport: Ice hockey
- Team: New South Wales

Arthur Cuthbertson (1888–1925) was an Australian ice hockey player, who represented New South Wales in the first two Goodall Cups.

== Biography ==
Cuthbertson was the grandson of the Rev. William Cuthbertson who was a minister of the Pitt Street Congregational Church, Sydney and his parents were William and Edith Cuthbertson of "Arricca" 10 Appian Way, Burwood. His father was a director of Buzacott and Co., Ltd., and a deacon of the Burwood Congregatlonal Church, where his family worshipped. Cuthbertson attended Newington College (1900–1906) and his Headmaster, Dr Charles Prescott, said later that he had a successful school career, and was prominent in sport: "He was a splendid footballer, cricket, too, strongly appealed to him." After matriculation he then studied medicine at the University of Sydney.

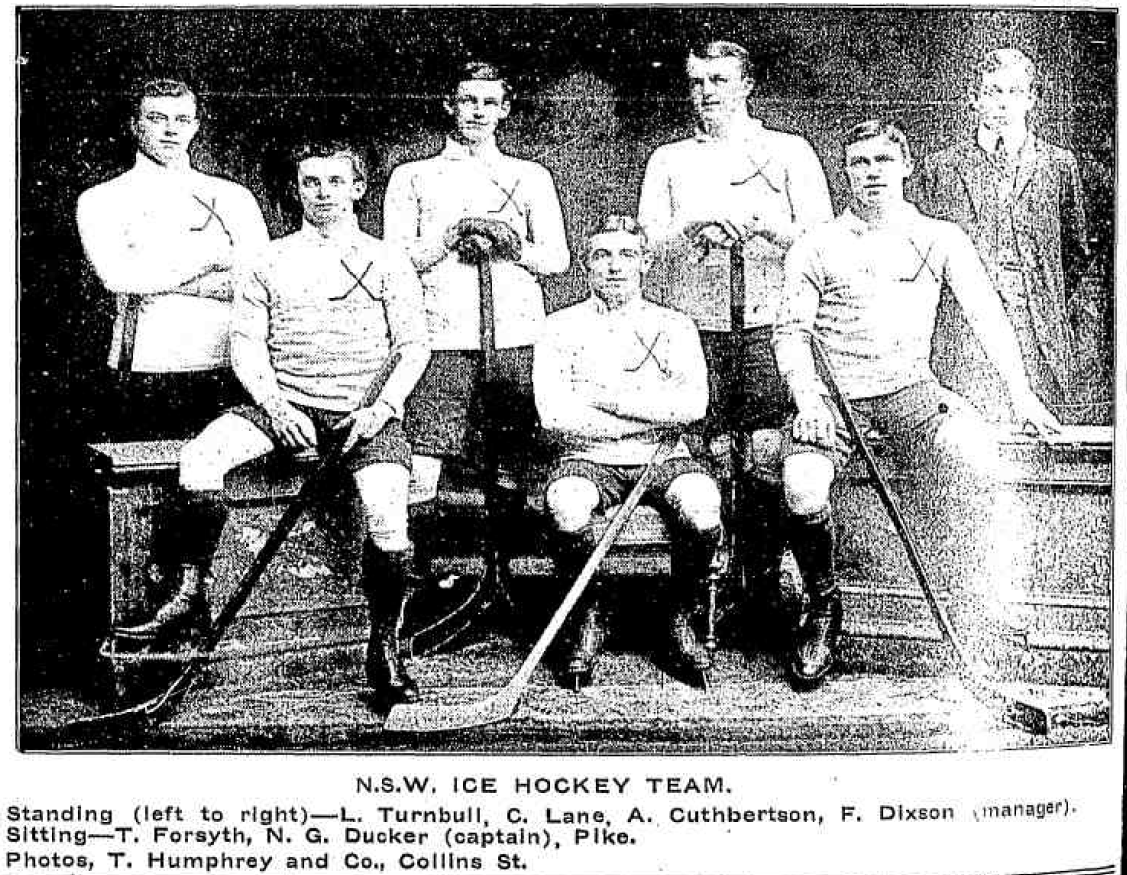
The first ice hockey team representing New South Wales 1909

In 1909 and 1910 Cuthbertson played ice hockey for the NSW Team in the Goodall Cup. Cuthbertson enlisted in June 1916 as a corporal with the Second Australian Imperial Force Machine Gun Battalion and served at the Battle of Passchendaele, Battle of the Somme and at Messines. After demobilisation he remained in Britain and finished his degrees at Edinburgh and Glasgow. Having graduated, Cutherfson was appointed ship's doctor on Waipara with the British India Line. He visited Sydney in 1922 before his death in a motor vehicle accident in London. He was knocked down and killed by a taxicab. At the time of his death he was 6 foot in height and weighed 17 stone and was looking for a practice in London prior to his expected marriage in September to his fiancé Miss Field.

== Gallery ==
Cuthbertson's childhood home, family church, school and university

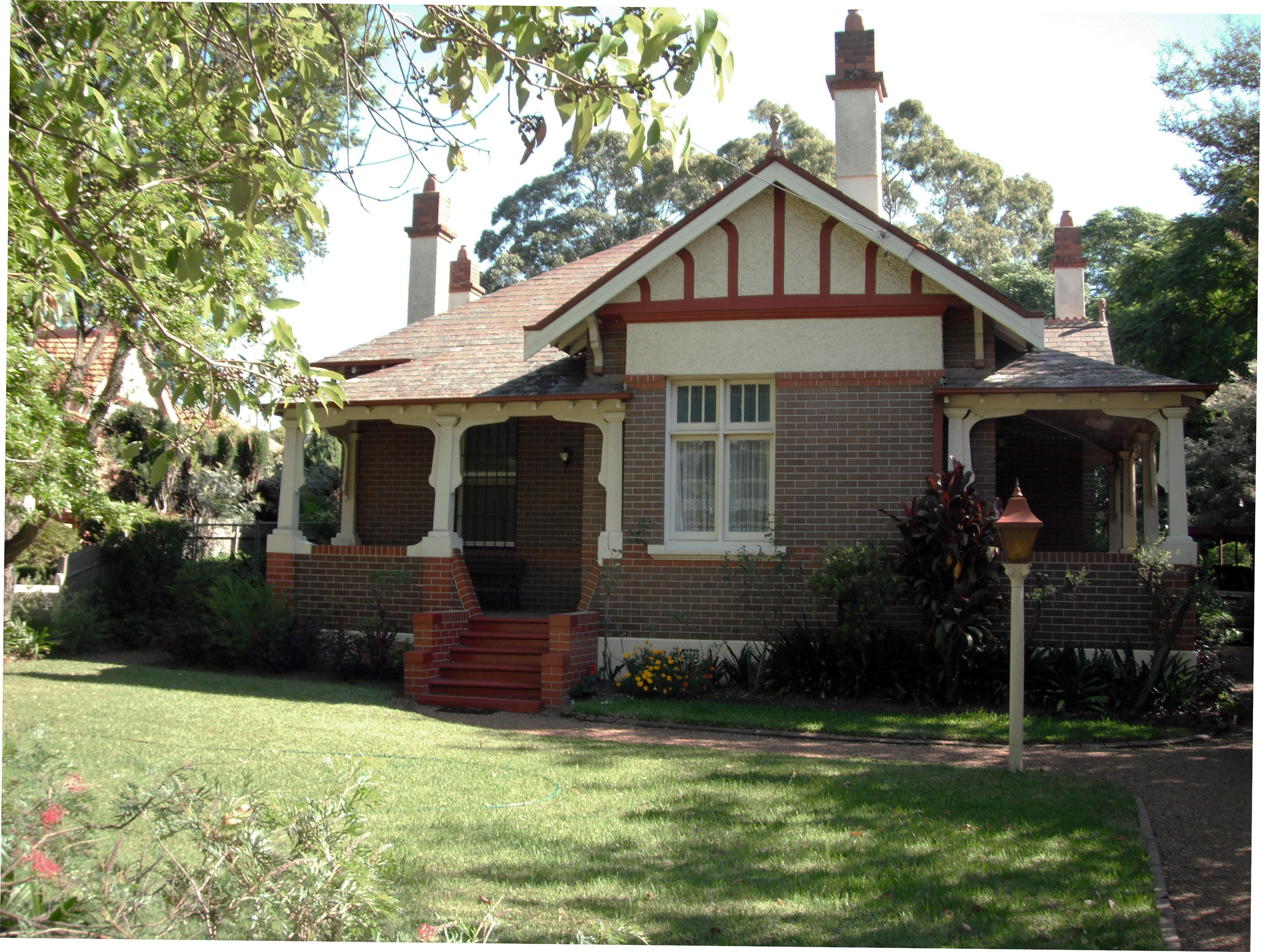

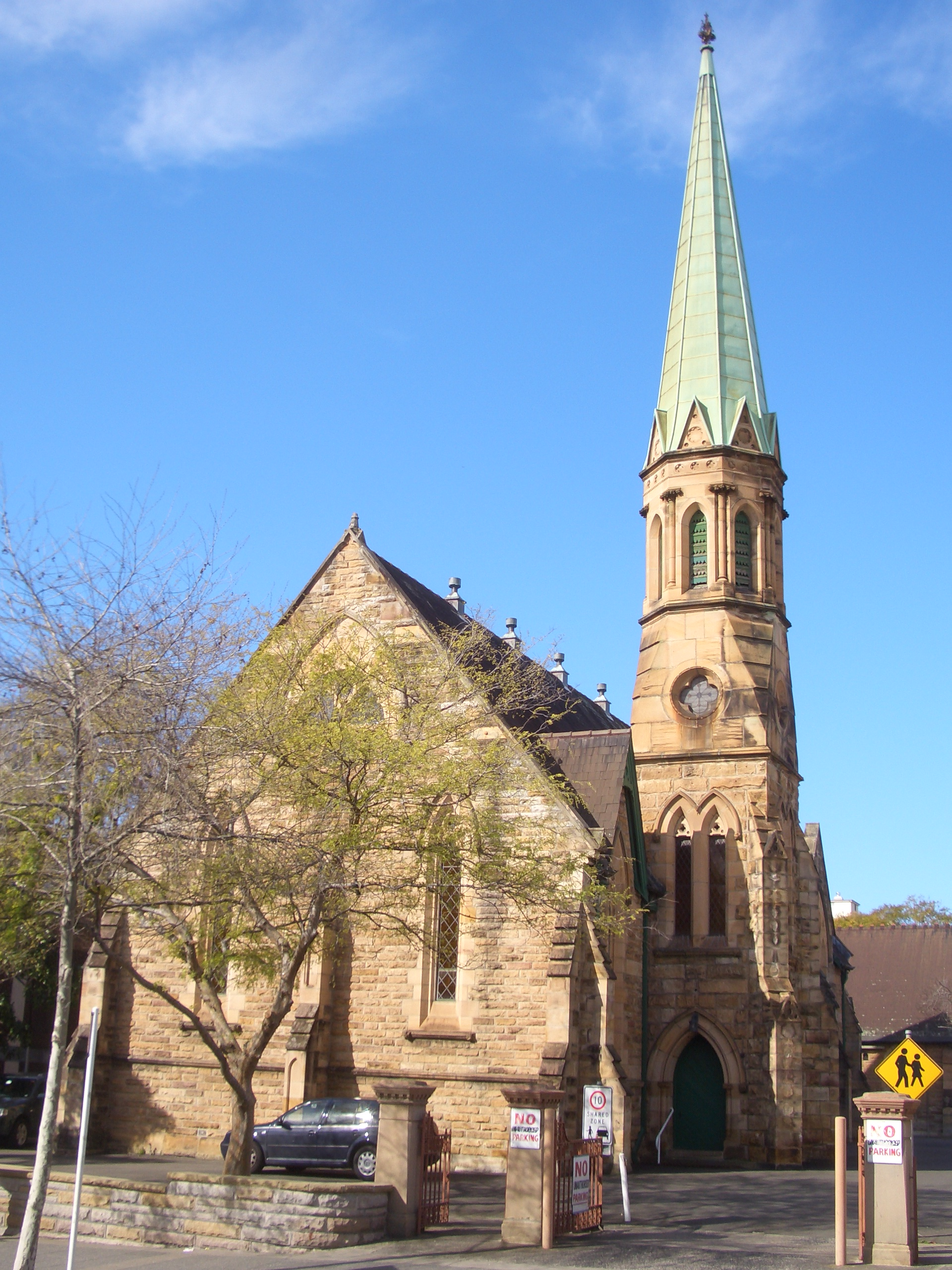

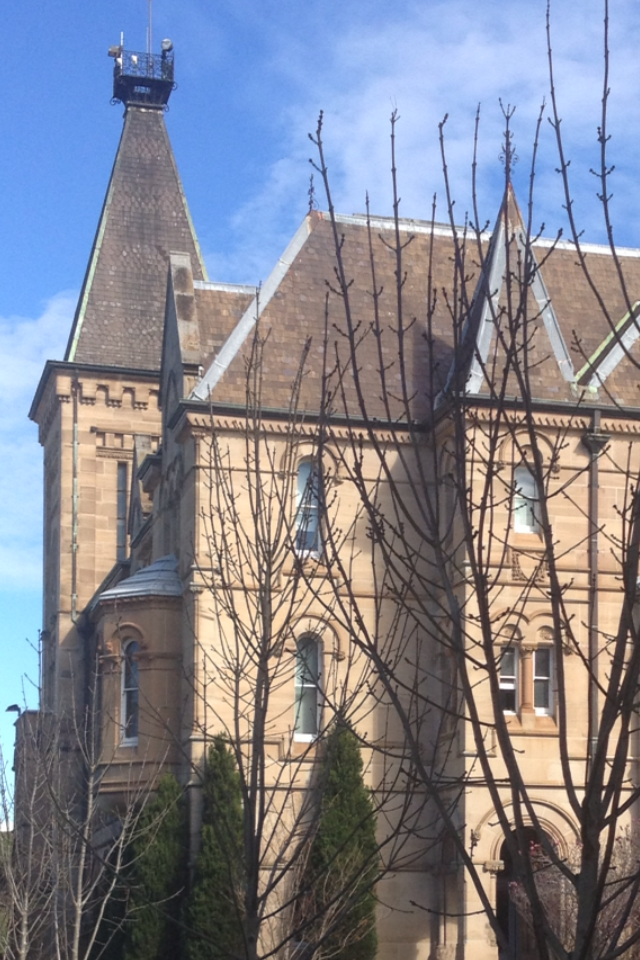

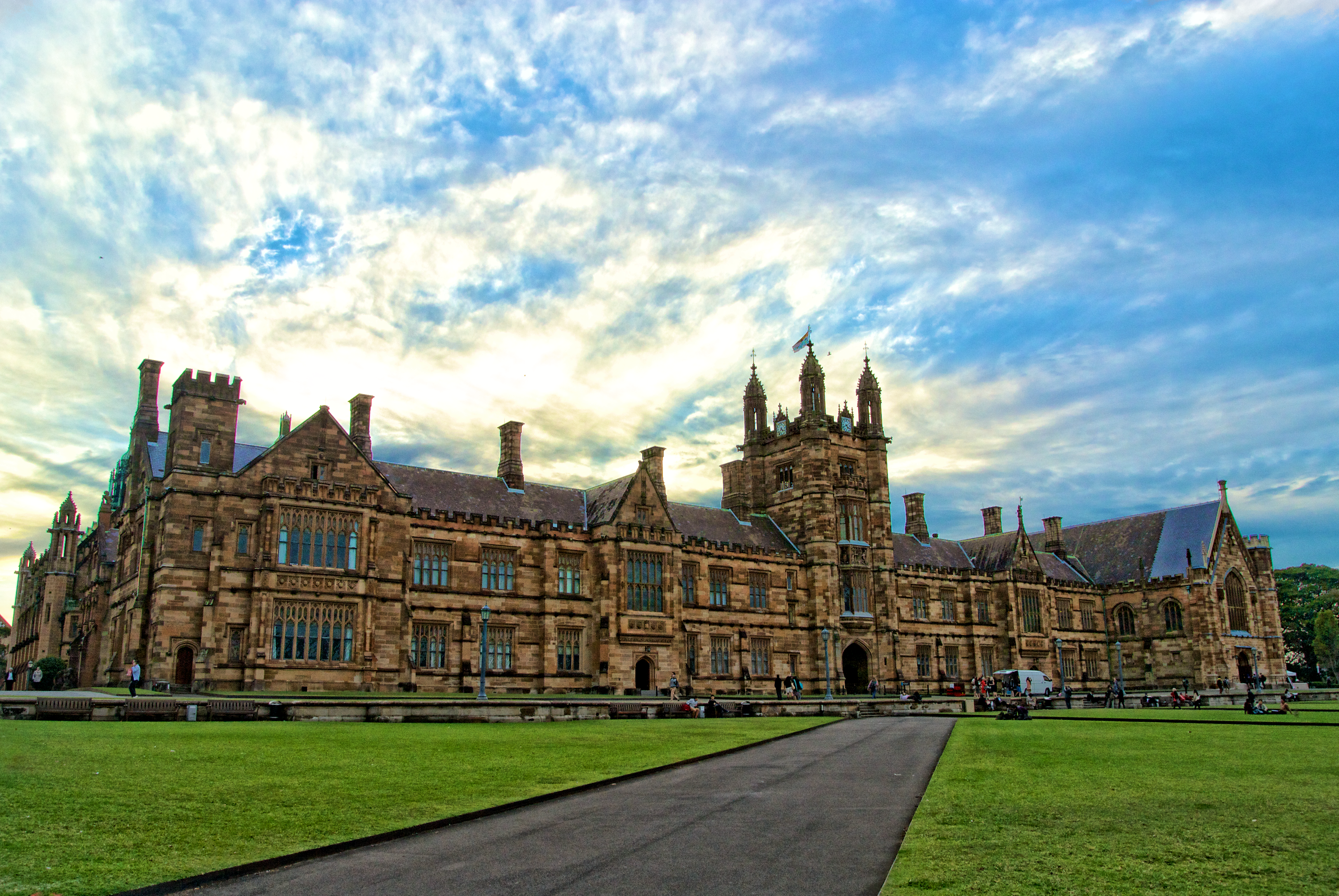
