= 1911 Goodall Cup Finals =

| | 1 | 2 | 3 | Total |
|---|---|---|---|---|
| Victoria | 3 | 5 | † | 0 |
| New South Wales | 5 | 7 | † | 2 |
- † – Denotes mixed teams
- Location(s): Melbourne, Victoria: Melbourne Glaciarium
- Format: best-of-three
- Coaches: Victoria: New South Wales: F. Dixon
- Dates: September 13 – September 18
- Series-winning goal: Jim Kendall

The 1911 Goodall Cup Final marks the third Inter-State Series ice hockey championship in Australia and the first of these championships won by New South Wales. As the second elected president of the Victorian Amateur Ice Hockey Sports Association, Philip John Rupert Steele Sr., presented a cup, gifted by John Edwin Goodall to the Captain of the winning New South Wales Team, Jim Kendall.

== The series ==
Game one

13 September 1911 was the first game of the series and saw the domination of Jim Kendall, who arrived from Canada 2 years before, in the game by scoring all 5 goals for New South Wales in the 5–3 win over Victoria. Mistakes in the early parts of the game by the Victorian team were used by the team to let Jim Kendall curve and twist around the opposition. Hal Reid contributed 2 goals and Keith Walker had one of his own but Victoria couldn't make it past the dominating efforts of Kendall.

Game two

14 September 1911 The match was closely fought but the dominance of Jim Kendall again proved to be too much for the Victorians as he scored 6 of the 7 goals for New South Wales, often sweeping from end to end like the puck was attached to his stick by a magnet. Dunbar Poole scored the 7th goal for New South Wales as they clinched the series with a 7–5 win over Victoria. In this game, Jim Kendall suffered an injury as a hockey stick split his shin bone during play, rendering him unable to compete in the final game of the 3-game championship.

Game three

September 18, 1911 Due to his injury from the second game, where the New South Wales team would clinch the series and win the Goodall Cup, Jim Kendall was on crutches due to splitting his shinbone from a blow to the leg with a hockey stick and was unable to play. Dunbar Poole was unable to stay and had also left, leaving the New South Wales team short 2 players. A decision was made to complete the final game of the series with a composite team of Dark Blue and Light Blue teams made up of the Victoria and New South Wales teams and emergency back up players for the Victorian team. The first half of the game saw 2 goals by Leslie Reid and one by Keith Walker place the Light Blue team in front by a score of 3–1, C. Smith scoring the goal for the Dark blue team. The second half of the game saw a comeback by the dark blue side with 3 goals by Jack Pike and a goal to Reid and Smith. The final score was 6–3 in favor of the Dark Blue team. The newly appointed second president of the VAIHSA, Philip John Rupert Steele Sr, presented a cup gifted by John Edwin Goodall to the injured New South Wales captain Jim Kendall on the evening after the final game of this series.

| Game-by-game | | Away team | Score | Home team | Scoring summary | Location |
|---|---|---|---|---|---|---|
| 1 | September 13 | New South Wales | 5-3 | Victoria | NSW - J. Kendall (5) VIC - H. Reid (2), K. Walker | Melbourne Glaciarium |
| 2 | September 14 | New South Wales | 7-5 | Victoria | NSW - J. Kendall (6), D. Poole VIC - K. Walker (3), H. Reid, L. Reid | Melbourne Glaciarium |
| 3 | September 18 | Light Blue** | 3–6 | Dark Blue** | Light Blue - L. Reid (2), K. Walker Dark Blue - J. Pike (3), C. Smith (2), H. Reid | Melbourne Glaciarium |
| New South Wales win best-of-three series 2 games to 0 | | | | | | Melbourne Glaciarium |

== Teams ==
=== Victoria ===
The Victoria team was made from the following players

- Henry "Hal" Newman Reid Jr.
- Leslie Reid
- Dudley Woods
- Keith Walker
- J. Blair
- Charles Watt (Goaltender)

=== New South Wales ===
The New South Wales team was made from the following players

- Jim Kendall (Captain)
- Dunbar Poole
- Les Turnbull
- Jack Pike
- C. Rowe
- F. Fowler (Goaltender)

=== ** Game 3 teams ===
==== Dark Blue ====
- Dudley Woods
- John Goodall
- Henry "Hal" Newman Reid Jr.
- C. Smith
- Jack Pike
- F. Fowler (Goaltender)

==== Light Blue ====
- Keith Walker
- Leslie Reid
- J. Blair
- Les Turnbull
- C. Rowe
- Charlie Watt (Goaltender)

== Player statistics ==
=== Scoring Leaders ===
The following players led the interstate championship for points.

| Player | Team | GP | G | A | Pts |
|---|---|---|---|---|---|
| Jim Kendall | New South Wales | 2 | 11 | 0 | 11 |
| Keith Curwen Walker | Victoria | 2 | 4 | 0 | 4 |
| Henry Newman Reid Jr. | Victoria | 2 | 3 | 0 | 3 |
| Dunbar Poole | New South Wales | 2 | 1 | 0 | 1 |
| Leslie Reid | Victoria | 2 | 1 | 0 | 1 |
| Dudley Woods | Victoria | 2 | 0 | 0 | 0 |
| Les Turnbull | New South Wales | 2 | 0 | 0 | 0 |
| J Blair | Victoria | 2 | 0 | 0 | 0 |
| Jack Pike | New South Wales | 2 | 0 | 0 | 0 |
| C. Rowe | New South Wales | 2 | 0 | 0 | 0 |

=== Leading goaltenders ===
The following goaltenders led the interstate championship for goals against average.

| Player | Team | GP | W | L | GA | SO | GAA |
|---|---|---|---|---|---|---|---|
| F Fowler | New South Wales | 2 | 2 | 0 | 8 | 0 | 4.00 |
| Charles Watt | Victoria | 2 | 0 | 2 | 12 | 0 | 6.00 |

== See also ==
- Goodall Cup
- Ice Hockey Australia
- Australian Ice Hockey League
