= 1909 Inter-State Series =

| | 1 | 2 | 3 | Total |
|---|---|---|---|---|
| Victoria | 1 | 1 | 6 | 2 |
| New South Wales | 2 | 0 | 1 | 1 |
- * – Denotes overtime period(s)
- Location(s): Melbourne, Victoria: Melbourne Glaciarium
- Format: best-of-three
- Coaches: Victoria: New South Wales: F. Dixon
- Dates: August 31 – September 4
- Series-winning goal: Keith Curwen Walker

The 1909 Inter-State Series was the inaugural inter-state ice hockey championship in Australia.

== The series ==
The first ice hockey team representing Victoria 1909

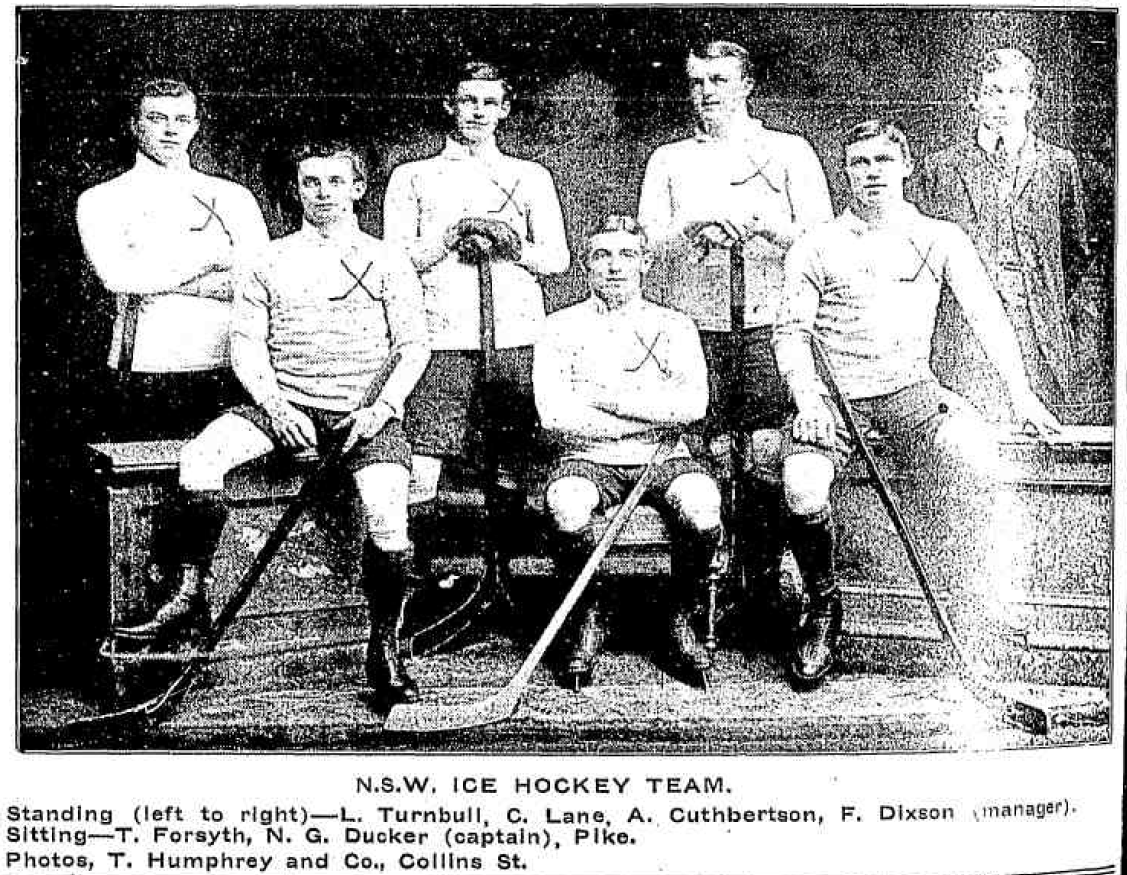
The first ice hockey team representing New South Wales 1909

The first inter-state ice hockey championship was held between a state representative team from Victoria and from New South Wales. This tournament was a best-of-3 format and saw Victoria win the series 2 games to 1. New South Wales was represented by a newly formed team in 1909 and traveled to Melbourne on 29 August 1909 which marked the first national interstate competition for senior men's hockey in Australia.

Game one

31 August 1909 as the first interstate ice hockey championship series to take place in Australia, there was anticipation for the event in the media. The scoring in the game began with a goal by New South Wales captain, Norman Ducker. The score remained 1-0 for the visiting New South Wales team by the end of the first half of play. The second half started off with a quick goal by Les Turnbull to increase the score to 2–0 in favor of New South Wales. Victoria were able to only score one goal later in the second half with a goal by Andrew Reid to bring the score to 2–1. The final score of the game saw the larger New South Wales team defeat Victoria 2–1.

Game two

Friday 3 September 1909 the Victorian team defeated the New South Wales team 1–0, giving Victorian goaltender Charles Watt the first recorded shutout in Interstate series history.

Game three

Saturday 4 September 1909 saw both teams enter the final game of the inaugural interstate competition having one game each. The first goal was scored by Andrew Reid of Victoria. The second goal was from a rush by Keith Walker to increase the lead for team Victoria to 2-0 and the end of the first half of game play. Within approximately 3 minutes of the 2nd half of the game, Norman Ducker was on a rush with Arthur Cuthbertson following close behind and shot at the net with making the save but Cuthbertson quickly buried the rebound. Victoria would go on to dominate the game with Victoria captain Robert Jackson scoring 3 quick goals and in the final moments of the game Walker scored from a pass by Andrew Reid. Victoria defeated New South Wales 6-1 and became the first team to win the interstate championship in Australia.

| Game-by-game | | Away team | Score | Home team | Scoring summary | Location |
|---|---|---|---|---|---|---|
| 1 | August 31 | New South Wales | 2–1 | Victoria | NSW – Ducker, Turnbull VIC – A. Reid | Melbourne Glaciarium |
| 2 | September 3 | New South Wales | 0–1 | Victoria | VIC – K. Walker | Melbourne Glaciarium |
| 3 | September 4 | New South Wales | 1–6 | Victoria | VIC – Jackson (3), Walker (2), A. Reid NSW – Cuthbertson | Melbourne Glaciarium |
| Victoria win best-of-three series 2 games to 1 | | | | | | Melbourne Glaciarium |

== Teams ==
=== Victoria ===
1909 Goodall Cup
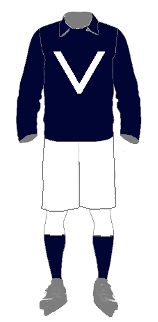
Victoria 1909

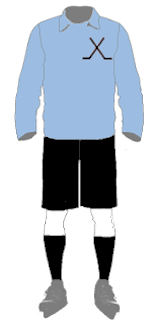
New South Wales 1909
Representations based on photographs and written descriptions.

The Victoria team was made from the following players

- Robert Jackson (Captain)
- Andrew Reid
- Walter Purbrick
- Keith Walker
- J. Blair
- Charles Watt (Goaltender)

=== New South Wales ===
The New South Wales team was made from the following players

- Norman Ducker (Captain)
- Arthur Cuthbertson
- Les Turnbull
- Jack Pike
- W. Forsyth
- Cyril Lane (Goaltender)

== Player statistics ==
=== Scoring leaders ===
The following players led the interstate championship for points.

| Player | Team | GP | G | A | Pts |
|---|---|---|---|---|---|
| Robert Edward Jackson | Victoria | 3 | 3 | 0 | 3 |
| Keith Curwen Walker | Victoria | 3 | 3 | 0 | 3 |
| Norman Ducker | New South Wales | 3 | 1 | 1 | 2 |
| Andrew Reid | Victoria | 3 | 2 | 1 | 3 |
| Arthur Cuthbertson | New South Wales | 3 | 1 | 0 | 1 |
| Les Turnbull | New South Wales | 3 | 1 | 0 | 1 |
| Walter Purbrick | Victoria | 3 | 0 | 0 | 0 |
| J Blair | Victoria | 3 | 0 | 0 | 0 |
| Jack Pike | New South Wales | 3 | 0 | 0 | 0 |
| W Forsyth | New South Wales | 3 | 0 | 0 | 0 |

=== Leading goaltenders ===
The following goaltenders led the interstate championship for goals against average.

| Player | Team | GP | W | L | GA | SO | GAA |
|---|---|---|---|---|---|---|---|
| Charles Watt | Victoria | 3 | 2 | 1 | 3 | 1 | 1.00 |
| Cyril Lane | New South Wales | 3 | 1 | 2 | 8 | 0 | 2.67 |

== See also ==
- Goodall Cup
- Ice Hockey Australia
- "30 Aug 1909 – The Argus – p4". trove.nla.gov.au.
- Australian Ice Hockey League
