= Goodall Cup =

Australian Ice Hockey League trophy

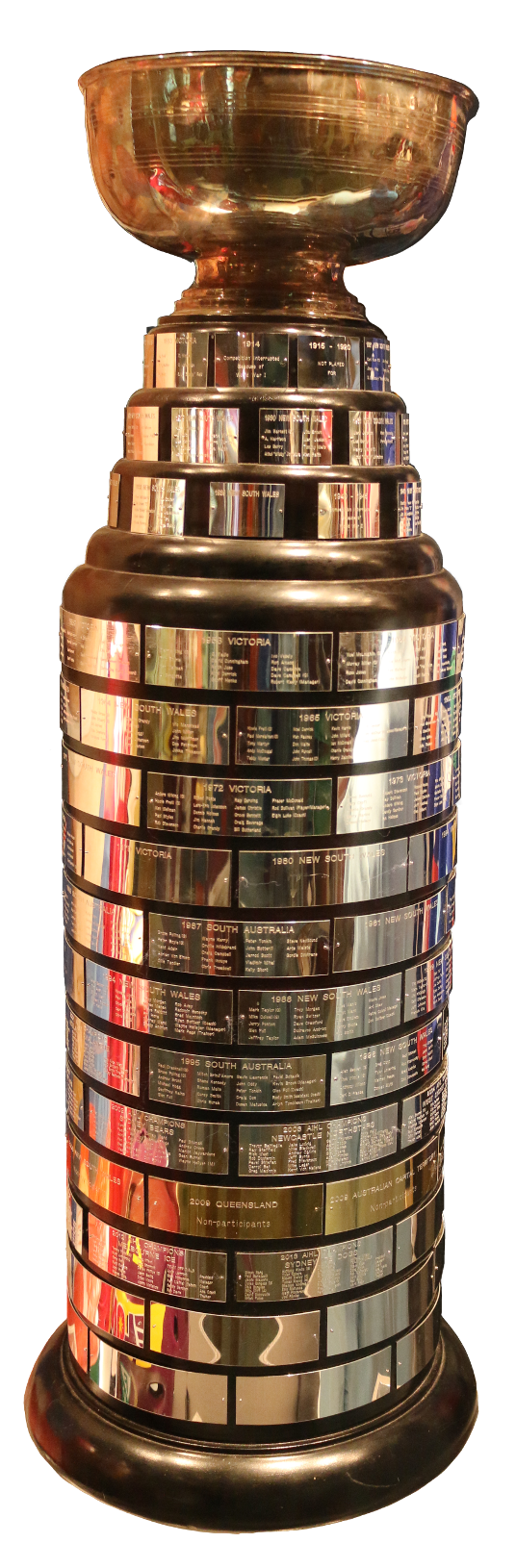
- Sport: Ice hockey
- Awarded for: Playoff champion of the Australian Ice Hockey League

History
- First award: 18 September 1911
- Most recent: Newcastle Northstars

The Goodall Cup is a perpetual trophy that is, currently, annually awarded to the playoff champions of the Australian Ice Hockey League (AIHL). The trophy is named after Australian born player John Edwin Goodall who originally donated the cup.

The Goodall Cup was originally gifted to the Inter-State Series, which was an annual 3 game series held between state teams, representing a selection of the best available players in each state. It was the championship trophy awarded to the first team to win 2 out of the 3 games in the Inter-State Series, that team would remain in possession of the cup until the following tournament.

The first evidence of the Goodall Cup having been presented was on 18 September 1911 by VAIHSA President Philip John Rupert Steele Sr to New South Wales Captain Jim Kendall, after being donated by John Edwin Goodall. The modern day version of the cup is instantly recognisable by the distinct single gold band of plaques around the lower barrel portion of the trophy.

There are currently three known versions of the Goodall Cup: A 'First Cup' which can be seen in a 1913 photograph, the "Original Cup" that now resides in the Hockey Hall of Fame in Toronto, Canada, and the "Replica Cup" that is currently used for presentations and is presented to the players upon becoming the AIHL finals champions.

== History ==
With the opening of the Sydney Glaciarium, ice hockey matches between Victoria and New South Wales representative teams began almost immediately. As early as 1907, teams from both states met up in the Sydney Glaciarium to play on 5 August 1907 at 10:15 pm. The New South Wales team won the game 3 – 0.

=== 1909–1910: The beginning of the Inter-State Series ===
The first ice hockey team representing Victoria 1909

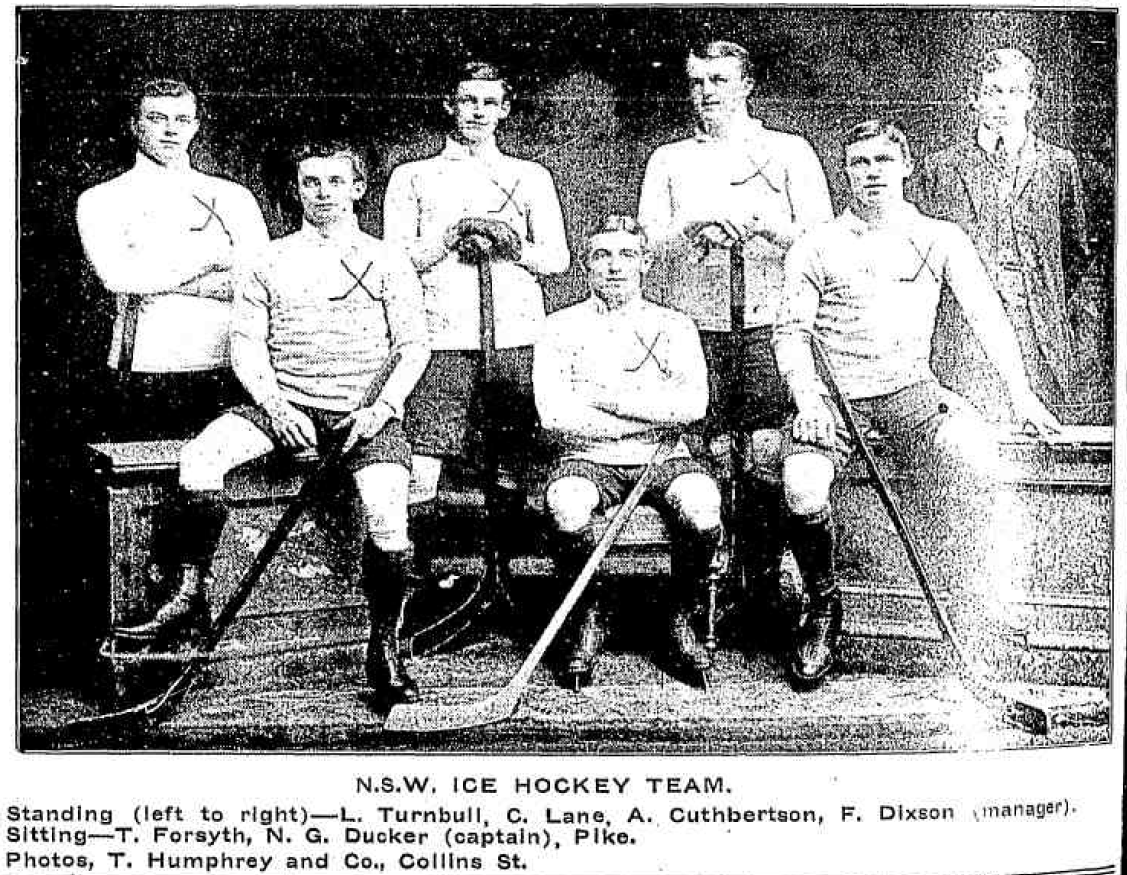
The first ice hockey team representing New South Wales 1909

31 August 1909

This evening marked the first Inter-State Series for ice hockey in Australia which was held between a state representative team from Victoria and from New South Wales. This tournament was a best-of-3 format and each game consisted of 2 halves with a break in between. There were 6 players that would play the whole duration of the game, which included the goaltender. In the first series Victoria won the series 2 games to 1. New South Wales was represented by a newly formed team in 1909 and travelled to Melbourne on 29 August 1909 which marked the first national interstate competition for senior men's hockey in Australia.

The first game of the 1909 Inter-State Series had a final score of 2–1 with New South Wales defeating Victoria. Friday 3 September 1909 the Victorian team defeated the New South Wales team 1–0, giving Victorian goaltender Charles Watt the first recorded shutout in the history of the Inter-State Series. In the third game of the series both teams had won a game each. Victoria defeated New South Wales 6–1 and became the first team to win the Inter-State Series Test in Australia.

23 July 1910

The first game of the second Inter-State Series saw team Victoria travel up to the Sydney Glaciarium to meet the New South Wales team in front of an enthusiastic crowd. Victoria defeated the New South Wales team by a score of 4–2 with goals being scored by Victorians Andrew Reid (who had 2 goals), Robert Jackson and Dudley Woods. Scoring for New South Wales was done by Jack Pike and Les Turnbull. The second game was dominated by Victoria who overwhelmed New South Wales by a score of 12–0. The third night concluded with the 3rd straight win for Victoria with a convincing 8–0 victory over New South Wales. The goals were scored by Henry "Hal" Newman Reid Jr., who had five goals and his brother Andrew Reid with three goals.

=== 1911: The Donation of the Goodall Cup ===
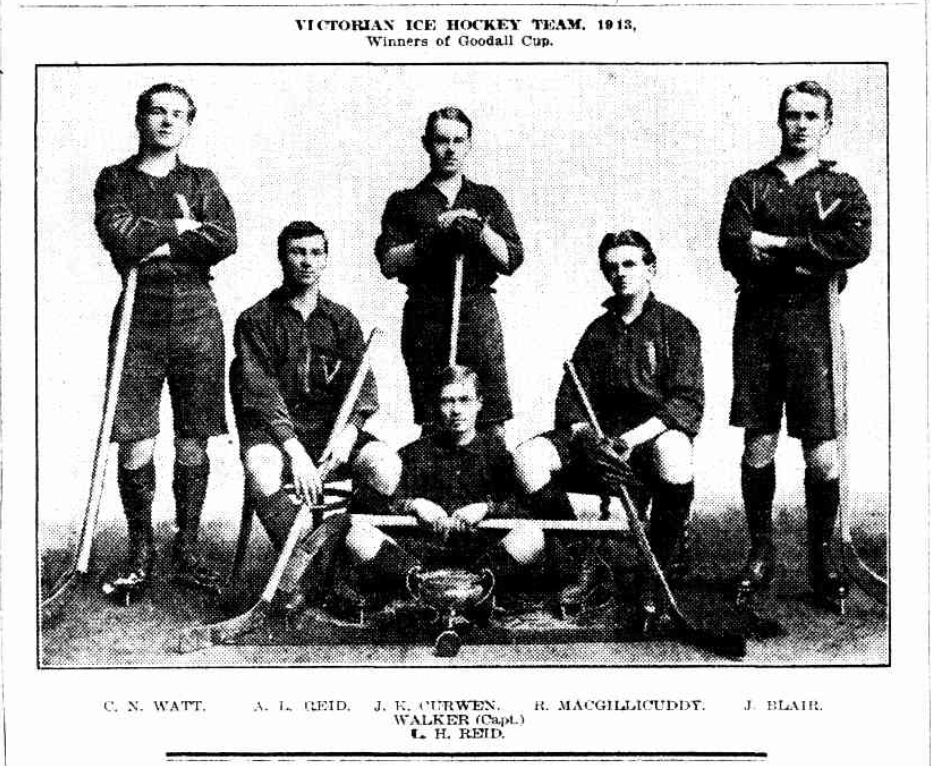
Victoria – Goodall Cup Champions 1913

13 September 1911

The date of the first of 3 games in the third Inter-State Series which saw New South Wales win the Goodall Cup and the dominant skill of Canadian born Jim Kendall who arrived in Australia 2 years before. Jim Kendall scored all 5 goals in the first game of the season for New South Wales in a 5–3 win over Victoria. The second match was closely fought but the dominance of Jim Kendall again proved to be too much for the Victorians as he scored 6 of the 7 goals for New South Wales, often sweeping from end to end like the puck was attached to his stick by a magnet. Dunbar Poole scored the 7th goal for New South Wales as they clinched the series with a 7–5 win over Victoria. In this game, Jim Kendall suffered an injury as a hockey stick split his shin bone during play, rendering him unable to compete in the final game of the 3 game championship. Dunbar Poole was unable to stay and had also left, leaving the New South Wales team short 2 players. A decision was made to complete the final game of the series with a composite team of Dark Blue and Light Blue teams made up of the Victoria and New South Wales teams and emergency back up players for the Victorian team. The final score was 6–3 in favour of the Dark Blue team. The newly appointed second president of the VAIHSA, Philip John Rupert Steele Sr, presented the Goodall Cup to the injured New South Wales captain Jim Kendall on the evening after the final game of this series.

23 August 1912

From this the first game on this date, New South Wales would win the Goodall Cup at home in the Sydney Glaciarium for the first time by winning all 3 games in the fourth inter-state series.

13 August 1913

From winning this first game and the second game two days later, Victoria won the inter-state series and the Goodall Cup was returned to them in this fifth inter-state series, which would be the last series before the Great War began and the series was suspended. The players would discuss the current progress of the war in the change rooms.

=== After The Great War ===
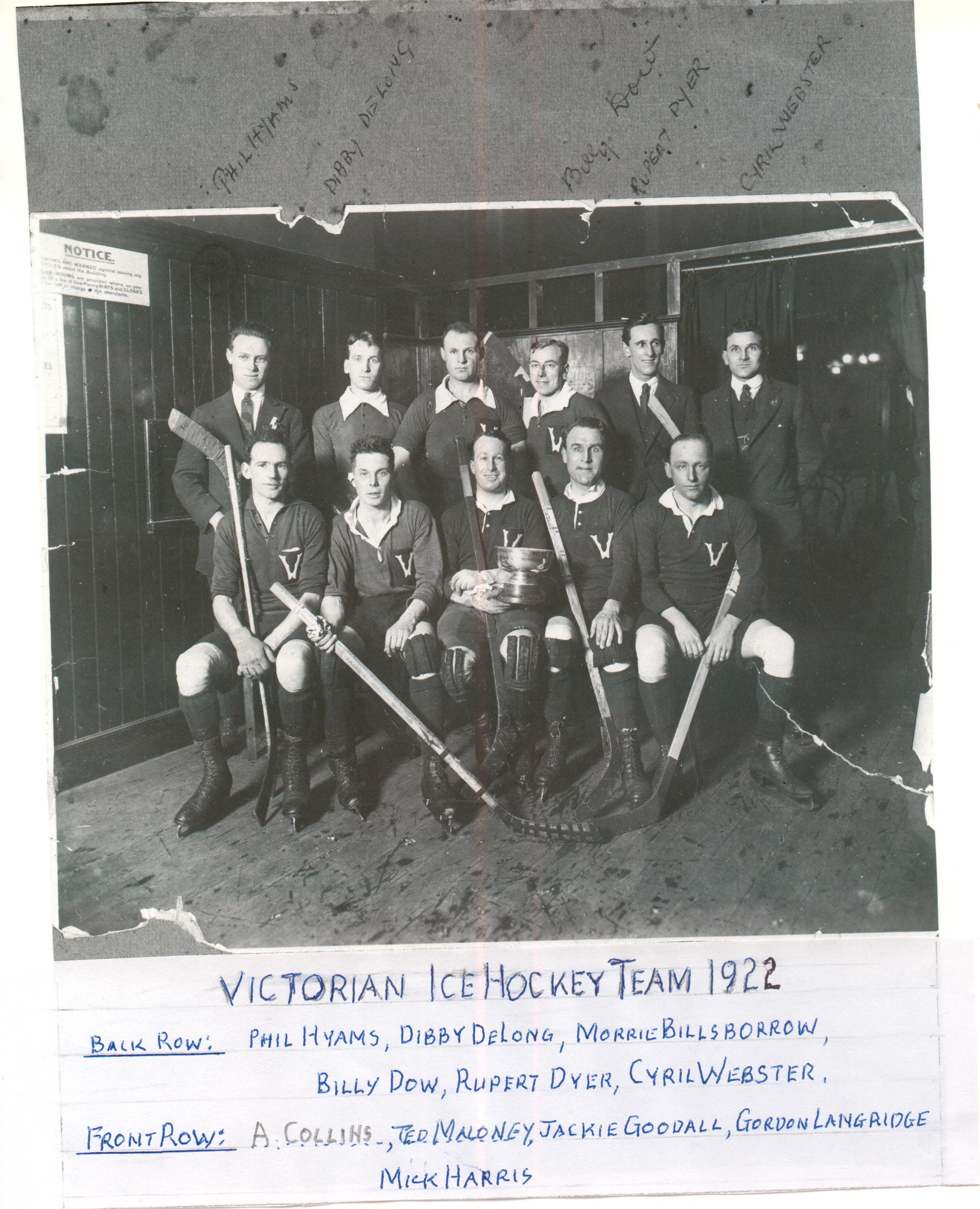
The 1922 Goodall Cup Champions, Victoria, with team Captain John Edwin Goodall holding the Goodall Cup

New South Wales and Victoria would not play again until 1921 as World War I forced the closure of the Sydney rink (which reopened in 1920) and the abandonment of the 1914 season. New South Wales won the 1921 series with a far superior line-up which included Canadian Jimmy Kendall, who had previously turned down a cadetship with the Montreal Professional Club. This also marked the same year that the first protective hockey equipment arrived from Canada.

In 1922 the Victorians, captained by John Edwin Goodall, won back the Goodall Cup in what was considered an upset. It was the last time the Victorians won the Cup until 1947, and the last time John Edwin Goodall would be part of a team that won the cup that he had donated in 1909.
The three game series had the following scores:
Game 1: Victoria – 4 New South Wales – 1
Game 1: Victoria – 3 New South Wales – 0
Game 1: Victoria – 0 New South Wales – 0

=== 1923–1931 AIHA ===
In 1923 a national federation formed and was named the Australian Ice Hockey Association (AIHA). John Edwin Goodall became the first elected president and A. De Long became the first elected Secretary/ Treasurer. The Goodall Cup would become the trophy awarded to the inter state championship.

The New South Wales State team would win every Goodall Cup in the 9 years of the national federation being called the Australian Ice Hockey Association (AIHA) from 1923 to 1931.

=== 1932–1937 AIHSSC ===
In the year of 1932 the Australian Ice Hockey Association (AIHA) was renamed the Australian Ice Hockey and Speed Skating Council (AIHSSC) and the Goodall Cup would remain the awarded championship trophy for the national competition. The New South Wales State team would win every cup for the 6 years that the national federation went under this name from 1932 to 1937, by winning all but the series in 1932 that resulted in a tied series.

There were cost concerns surrounding the yearly inter state series and some of the players were unable to travel due to not being able to afford the trip. After the national council held a meeting in August, they were undecided about the future of the inter state series and left the decision to the rink managers in Sydney and Melbourne.

=== 1938 AIHF and joining the IIHF ===
In the year 1938, the Australian Ice Hockey and Speed Skating Council (AIHSSC) was renamed the Australian Ice Hockey Federation (AIHF) and became part of the International Ice Hockey Federation (IIHF) on 11 February 1938. The Goodall Cup would continue being the awarded trophy for champions of the national competition that remained between Victoria and New South Wales.

New South Wales would win the Goodall Cup in 1938 and 1939 before the national competition was interrupted in 1940 by the events of World War II.

=== After World War II ===
In 1946, the national competition recommenced and the series was hosted by Victoria at the St. Moritz Ice Rink located in St. Kilda, Victoria.

A record crowd of 5000 people saw the final game of the series on Wednesday 7 August 1946, which resulted in a tie game and a tied series. This tied series resulted in the New South Wales state team retaining the Goodall Cup for 1946 due to having been the previous champions in 1939 before World War II interrupted the competition.

=== 1st Expansion: Tasmania ===
1 July 1952 marked the first expansion of the inter-state series with the new inclusion of Tasmania into the competition. The game was played in the Hobart Glaciarium

=== Glaciarium Closure ===
The Goodall Cup was not contested from 1956 to 1960, where 1956 saw the Sydney Glaciarium close down and in 1957 the Melbourne Glaciarium close down, making it the longest operating rink at 50 years.

=== Queensland wins its first (and only) Cup ===
In 1977 the Queensland state team won the Goodall Cup, the first time a state team other than Victoria or New South Wales had won the championship. It was also the only time to date (2021) that Queensland has won the championship. The team that year was captained by Thornton McLaren and coached (player-coach) by Russ Trudeau and sparked by a 19-year old kid from Burnaby, British Columbia, named Doug Waymark, who won the John Nicholas Trophy as the most valuable player (MVP) of the tournament. The team was composed of eight Aussies, eight Canucks, and one Swiss.

=== Goodall Cup post-1977 ===
In 1986 the South Australia state team won its first Goodall Cup. It was the only state other than Victoria and New South Wales to win a Goodall Cup since Queensland had won in 1977. Moreover, South Australia won the Goodall Cup again in 1987.

In 1993, the Goodall Cup was not contested due to financial concerns.

In 1998, the Australian Capital Territory won its first Goodall Cup.

=== 2002–2008 AIHL ===
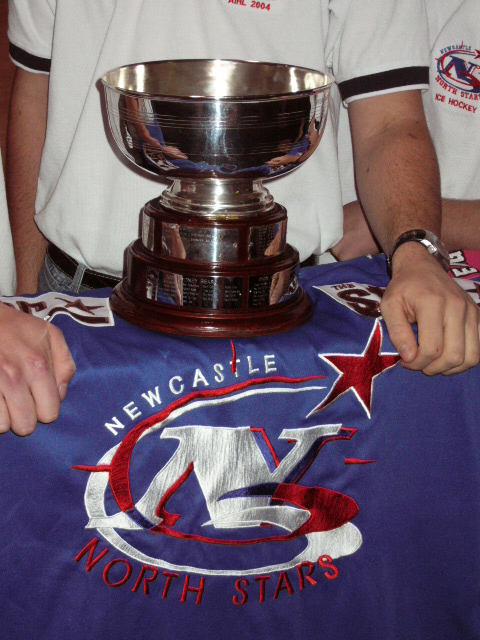
The Goodall Cup resting on a Newcastle North Stars jersey in 2004 prior to the AIHL & Goodall Cup finals in Sept 2004.

The AIHL was formed in the year 2000 and consisted of 3 teams: Adelaide Avalanche, Sydney Bears and Canberra Knights.

In 2002, The AIHL expanded from 3 teams to 6 teams with the inclusion of Melbourne Ice, Newcastle North Stars and West Sydney Ice Dogs. The Australian Ice Hockey Federation (AIHF) adopted the official business name Ice Hockey Australia (IHA) and the Goodall Cup was transferred from the IHA interstate championship to the AIHL and became the trophy given to the winners of the finals series for the newly formed AIHL.

The Sydney Bears won the first AIHL Goodall Cup in 2002 in a finals series hosted at the Sydney-based Blacktown Ice Arena where they defeated the Adelaide Avalanche.

=== Celebrating 100 years ===
The Goodall Cup was withdrawn from the AIHL in 2009 by the cup's custodians, Ice Hockey Australia (IHA). It was instead awarded to South Australia in a traditional state vs state tournament held in Adelaide, South Australia in October 2009 as a 100-year celebration of the Goodall Cup.

To mark the centenary championship, a single band of gold plaques circles the trophy with each containing the name of each State Team. Those teams that did not participate in the centenary final match have the words "Non-participants" under the state name.

The original Goodall Cup was retired before the centenary finals and now resides in the Hockey Hall of Fame in Toronto, Ontario, Canada. A "Replica Cup" was made for use in the 2009 centenary finals and was the version of the cup that was awarded to the Adelaide state team.

=== 2010–present AIHL ===
In 2010 the Goodall Cup was offered back to the AIHL, and the cup was accepted by a vote of the members and board. The Goodall Cup has been re-instated by the AIHL as its finals tournament trophy and as the prize signifying Australian champions of ice hockey. Adelaide Adrenaline, winners of the 2009 AIHL playoff were engraved into the cup and are also known as the 2009 Goodall Cup champions.

== Traditions and Cup history ==
The Goodall Cup in 2009, after the addition of a third tier.

=== Tied Series ===
There are two different years where the interstate championship series resulted in a tied series, seeing the Goodall Cup being retained by the previous years winner rather than actually awarded to a champion of the series. These years have been incorrectly recorded as a win in many references to these particular series as well as being inscribed on the Goodall Cup as being victories.

==== 1932 ====
Wednesday 3 August 1932 was the final game of the three game series between Victoria and New South Wales and resulted in a win for Victoria to tie the series.

The series results were as follows:
Game 1 (30 July 1932)
Victoria – 0 New South Wales – 6
( Goals scored: NSW- W. Johnson(3), Went(1), Raith(1), Darke(1) )

Game 2 (1 August 1932)
Victoria – 1 New South Wales – 1
( Goals scored: NSW- Went(1) VIC- Moore(1) )

Game 3 (3 August 1932)
Victoria – 2 New South Wales – 0

==== 1946 ====
This series was hosted at the St. Moritz Ice Rink located in St. Kilda, Victoria. The last game of the series was held on Wednesday 7 August 1946 and saw a record crowd of 5000 people at the venue. This tied series resulted in the New South Wales state team retaining the Goodall Cup for 1946 due to having been the previous champions in 1939 before World War II interrupted the competition.

The series results were as follows:
Game 1 (3 August 1946)
Victoria – 2 New South Wales – 3

Game 2 (5 August 1946)
Victoria – 2 New South Wales – 1
( Goals scored: VIC- Nichol(1), Massina(1) NSW- Thorpe(1) )

Game 3 (7 August 1946)
Victoria – 2 New South Wales – 2
( Goals scored: VIC- Nichol(2) NSW- Brown(1), F. Terger(1) )

=== First, Original and Replica versions ===
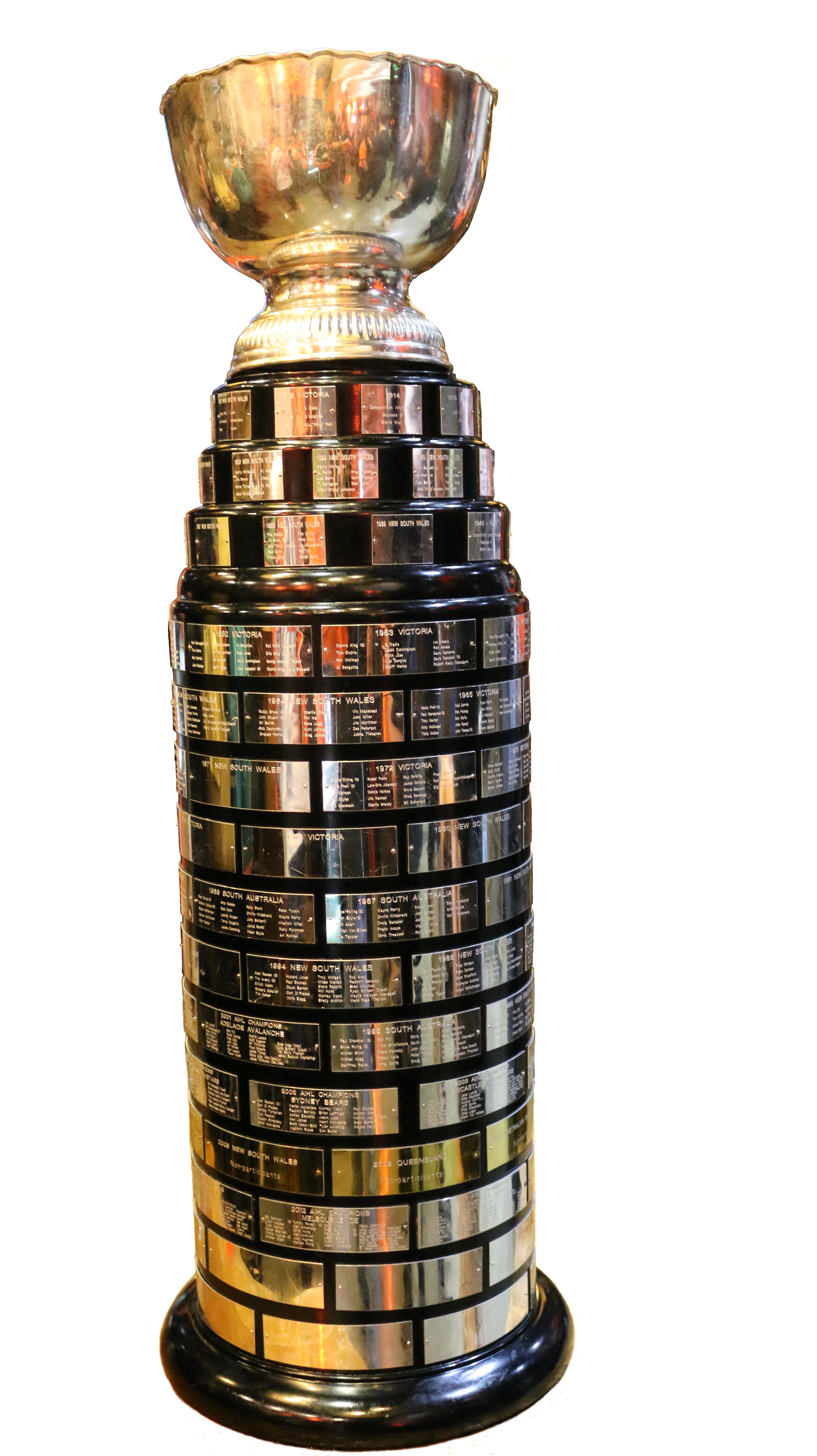
The Goodall Cup "Replica Cup", made in 2009

There are technically three known versions of the Goodall Cup championship trophy: the "First Cup", the "Original Cup" and the "Replica Cup" but there was a fourth different cup used as a state level premiership trophy in Victoria after the Great War, appearing in 1922 which was also referred to as the Goodall Cup and also donated by John Edwin Goodall.

==== First Cup ====
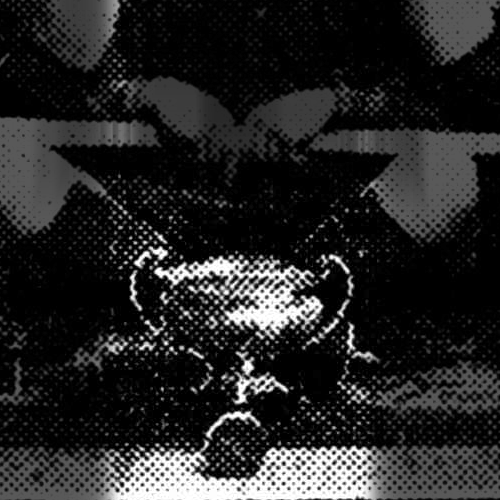
1913 version of the Goodall Cup

A cup was awarded in 1911 when the newly appointed second president of the VAIHA, Philip John Rupert Steele Sr, presented the Inter-state cup to the injured New South Wales captain Jim Kendall on the evening after the final game of the 1911 series. This cup was gifted by John Edwin Goodall It is known that the 1913 Goodall Cup was a different cup to the modern 'original' Goodall Cup that is now being stored in the Hockey Hall of Fame.

An earlier "Goodall Cup" can be seen in a 1913 photo taken with the winning Victorian team, it is a bowl with 2 handles. The Victorian team would gain the honour of holding the cup until the next season it was to be contested again.

==== Original Cup ====
The 'original' cup refers to the longest used version of the Interstate Cup referred to as the Goodall Cup. Inscribed on the bowl of the original cup are the words: "Inter-State Hockey Cup Presented by J.E. Goodall", named for John Edwin Goodall who donated the cup. The original cup can be seen as early as 1922, where Goodall is seen holding the cup while sitting with the winning Victorian team. This cup continued to be presented as a perpetual trophy.

The cup was partially restored in 2004 by the champions at the time, the Newcastle North Stars where the pewter cup was polished and the original wooden single tier mount was replaced with a 2 tier wooden mount.

A 3rd larger redwood tier was added to the trophy between the 2004 restoration works and the 2009 large barrel was added.

Midway through 2009, the cup was again restored and mounted on a large barrel-like base covered in name plates to be ready for the centenary game. This is the cup's current form. This final version of the trophy was retired after being awarded to the players in 2009 and it now resides in the Hockey Hall of Fame in Toronto.

==== Replica Cup ====
The Federation agreed to the purchase of a replica Goodall Cup in March 2009 after the "Original Cup" was considered too precious to continue travelling. The "Replica Cup" was created in 2009 and was to be used at all national championships and state association events.

The replica cup was first awarded in 2009 to the Adelaide state team in the centenary game.

Inscribed on the bowl of the "Replica Cup" are the words: "Inter-State Hockey Cup Presented by J.E. Goodall", like the original cup.

=== Missing Cup ===
1995 substitute trophy awarded instead of the Goodall Cup

The 1995 Goodall Cup series was won by South Australia, defeating New South Wales 3 – 2 in front of a capacity crowd at Ringwood Ice Rink in Victoria, Australia. The previous years champions were New South Wales and the cup was not brought to the 1995 tournament, leaving Ice Hockey Australia needing to provide a substitute trophy. The mock trophy was not well received by the South Australian team and was destroyed and left on top of a caravan, never being brought back to their home in Adelaide, South Australia.

== Winners of the Goodall Cup ==
- 1909 Inter-State Series Victoria
- 1910 Inter-State Series Victoria

- 1911 New South Wales
- 1912 New South Wales
- 1913 Victoria
- 1914 Not played – World War I
- 1915 Not played – World War I
- 1916 Not played – World War I
- 1917 Not played – World War I
- 1918 Not played – World War I
- 1919 Not played – Spanish flu
- 1920 Not played - financial reasons
- 1921 New South Wales
- 1922 Victoria
- 1923 New South Wales
- 1924 New South Wales
- 1925 New South Wales
- 1926 New South Wales
- 1927 New South Wales
- 1928 New South Wales
- 1929 New South Wales
- 1930 New South Wales
- 1931 New South Wales
- 1932 New South Wales
- 1933 New South Wales
- 1934 New South Wales
- 1935 New South Wales
- 1936 New South Wales
- 1937 New South Wales
- 1938 New South Wales
- 1939 New South Wales
- 1940 Not played – World War II
- 1941 Not played – World War II
- 1942 Not played – World War II
- 1943 Not played – World War II
- 1944 Not played – World War II
- 1945 Not played – World War II
- 1946 New South Wales
- 1947 Victoria
- 1948 New South Wales
- 1949 Victoria
- 1950 New South Wales
- 1951 Victoria
- 1952 Victoria
- 1953 Victoria
- 1954 Victoria
- 1955 Not played – Closure of Sydney Glaciarium
- 1956 Not played – Closure of Sydney Glaciarium
- 1957 Not played – Closure of Sydney Glaciarium
- 1958 Not played – Closure of Sydney Glaciarium
- 1959 Not played – Closure of Sydney Glaciarium
- 1960 Not played – Closure of Sydney Glaciarium
- 1961 Victoria
- 1962 Victoria
- 1963 New South Wales
- 1964 New South Wales
- 1965 Victoria
- 1966 Victoria
- 1967 Victoria
- 1968 Victoria
- 1969 New South Wales
- 1970 New South Wales
- 1971 New South Wales
- 1972 Victoria
- 1973 Victoria
- 1974 Victoria
- 1975 Victoria
- 1976 Victoria
- 1977 Queensland
- 1978 Victoria
- 1979 Victoria
- 1980 New South Wales
- 1981 New South Wales
- 1982 Victoria
- 1983 New South Wales
- 1984 New South Wales
- 1985 New South Wales
- 1986 South Australia
- 1987 South Australia
- 1988 New South Wales
- 1989 New South Wales
- 1990 South Australia
- 1991 South Australia
- 1992 New South Wales
- 1993 Not played - financial reasons
- 1994 New South Wales
- 1995 South Australia
- 1996 New South Wales
- 1997 South Australia
- 1998 Australian Capital Territory
- 1999 New South Wales
- 2000 New South Wales
- 2001 Adelaide Avalanche
- 2002 Sydney Bears
- 2003 Newcastle North Stars
- 2004 West Sydney Ice Dogs
- 2005 Newcastle North Stars
- 2006 Newcastle North Stars
- 2007 Penrith Bears
- 2008 Newcastle North Stars
- 2009 South Australia
- 2009 Adelaide Adrenaline
- 2010 Melbourne Ice
- 2011 Melbourne Ice
- 2012 Melbourne Ice
- 2013 Sydney Ice Dogs
- 2014 Melbourne Mustangs
- 2015 Newcastle North Stars
- 2016 Newcastle North Stars
- 2017 Melbourne Ice
- 2018 CBR Brave
- 2019 Sydney Bears
- 2020 Not played – COVID-19 pandemic
- 2021 Not played – COVID-19 pandemic
- 2022 CBR Brave
- 2023 Melbourne Mustangs
- 2024 Canberra Brave
- 2025 Melbourne Ice
- 2026 Newcastle Northstars

=== Goodall Cup all-time record ===
All-time Goodall Cup winners
Team	# Titles	Years
Adelaide Adrenaline	1	2009
Adelaide Avalanche	1	2001
Australian Capital Territory	1	1998
Canberra Brave	3	2018, 2022, 2024
Melbourne Ice	5	2010, 2011, 2012, 2017, 2025
Melbourne Mustangs	2	2014, 2023
Newcastle Northstars	7	2003, 2005, 2006, 2008, 2015, 2016, 2026
New South Wales	40	1911, 1912, 1921, 1923, 1924, 1925, 1926, 1927, 1928, 1929; 1930, 1931, 1932, 1933, 1934, 1935, 1936, 1937, 1938, 1939; 1946, 1948, 1950, 1963, 1964, 1969, 1970, 1971, 1980, 1981; 1983, 1984, 1985, 1988, 1989, 1992, 1994, 1996, 2000
Queensland	1	1977
South Australia	7	1986, 1987, 1990, 1991, 1995, 1997, 2009
Sydney Bears	3	2002, 2007, 2019
Sydney Ice Dogs	2	2004, 2013
Victoria	22	1913, 1922, 1947, 1949, 1951, 1952, 1953, 1954, 1961, 1962; 1965, 1966, 1967, 1968, 1972, 1973, 1974, 1975, 1976, 1978; 1979, 1982

== See also ==
- Ice Hockey Australia
- Australian Ice Hockey League
- Australian Women's Ice Hockey League
- Australian Junior Ice Hockey League
- Jim Brown Shield
- Joan McKowen Memorial Trophy
