= John Edwin Goodall =

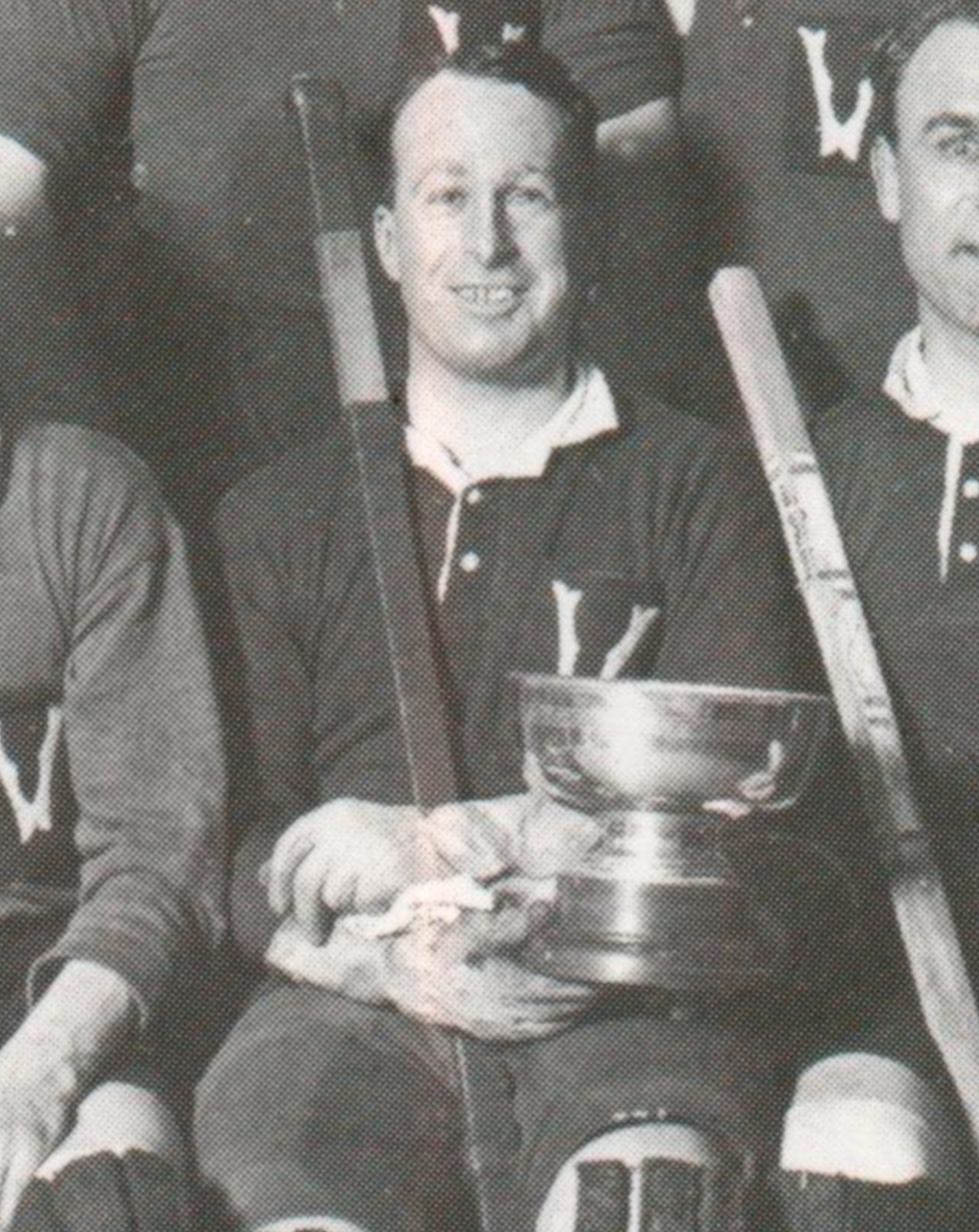
- Image courtesy Legends of Australian Ice, online: http://icelegendsaustralia.com/

Personal information
- Full name: John Edwin Goodall
- Nationality: Australian
- Born: 1893 St. Kilda, Victoria, Australia
- Died: 19 April 1960 (aged 66–67) Brighton, Victoria, Australia
- Spouse: Kathleen Ellen Fanning

Sport
- Country: Australia
- Sport: Ice Hockey
- Team: Melburnians IHC; Victoria

John Edwin Goodall (1893 - 19 April 1960) was an Australian ice hockey player, president of the Australian Ice Hockey Association (since 1923), and founder of the Goodall Cup which he donated to the annual inter-state ice hockey tournament.

== Early life ==
John Edwin Goodall was the second child of Charles Edwin Goodall and Ada Jessie Dougharty. Their first child, Chas John Goodall was born in 1890 but lived for only 10 days.

== Ice Hockey ==
=== Goodall Cup ===
John Edwin Goodall was one who gifted a cup, which is referred to as the Goodall Cup at present, to the interstate series. The inaugural interstate series was in 1909 The newly appointed second president of the VAIHA, Philip John Rupert Steele Sr, presented an interstate cup, gifted by John Goodall, to the injured New South Wales captain Jim Kendall on the evening after the final game of this series.

=== Playing Hockey ===
18 September 1911 was the third match of the interstate series between New South Wales and Victoria. The New South Wales team had won the first two matches which clinched the series, however the second game left New South Wales captain Jim Kendall injured with a split shin bone after a blow to the leg during the hockey match. Due to Kendall's injury rendering him unable to play and Dunbar Poole also absent for the final game, the New South Wales team was short of 2 players. A decision was made to complete the final game of the series with a composite team of Dark Blue and Light Blue teams made up of the Victoria and New South Wales teams and emergency back up players for the Victorian team. John Goodall, listed as a Victorian player, was named in the Dark Blue side. The final score was 6–3 in favor of the Dark Blue team. The newly appointed second president of the VAIHA, Philip John Rupert Steele Sr, presented an interstate cup, gifted by John Goodall, to the injured New South Wales captain Jim Kendall on the evening after the final game of this series.

== Skating ==
John Goodall became the fourth National Ice Skating Association of Australia (NISAA) National Men's Skating Champion in 1914.
