= Melbourne Glaciarium =

Ice skating facility

Coordinates: 37°49′15″S 144°58′02″E

- Harold Paynting Collection, State Library of Victoria
- Interactive map of Melbourne Glaciarium
- Location: 16 City Road, South Melbourne, 3205
- Surface: 54.9 metres (180 ft) × 27.4 metres (90 ft)

Construction
- Opened: 9 June 1906

The Melbourne Glaciarium (also known as the Glaci) opened in 1906, the second indoor ice skating facility built in Australia after the Adelaide Glaciarium. It was located on City Road, just west of St Kilda Road, and also had frontage on the Yarra bank. 'The Glaci' hosted the first game of ice hockey played in Australia and was the home of the first ice hockey association in Australia. At the time the Melbourne Glaciarium was opened, it was the 3rd largest indoor ice rink in the world. The rink closed in 1957 and was destroyed by fire in 1963.

== History ==
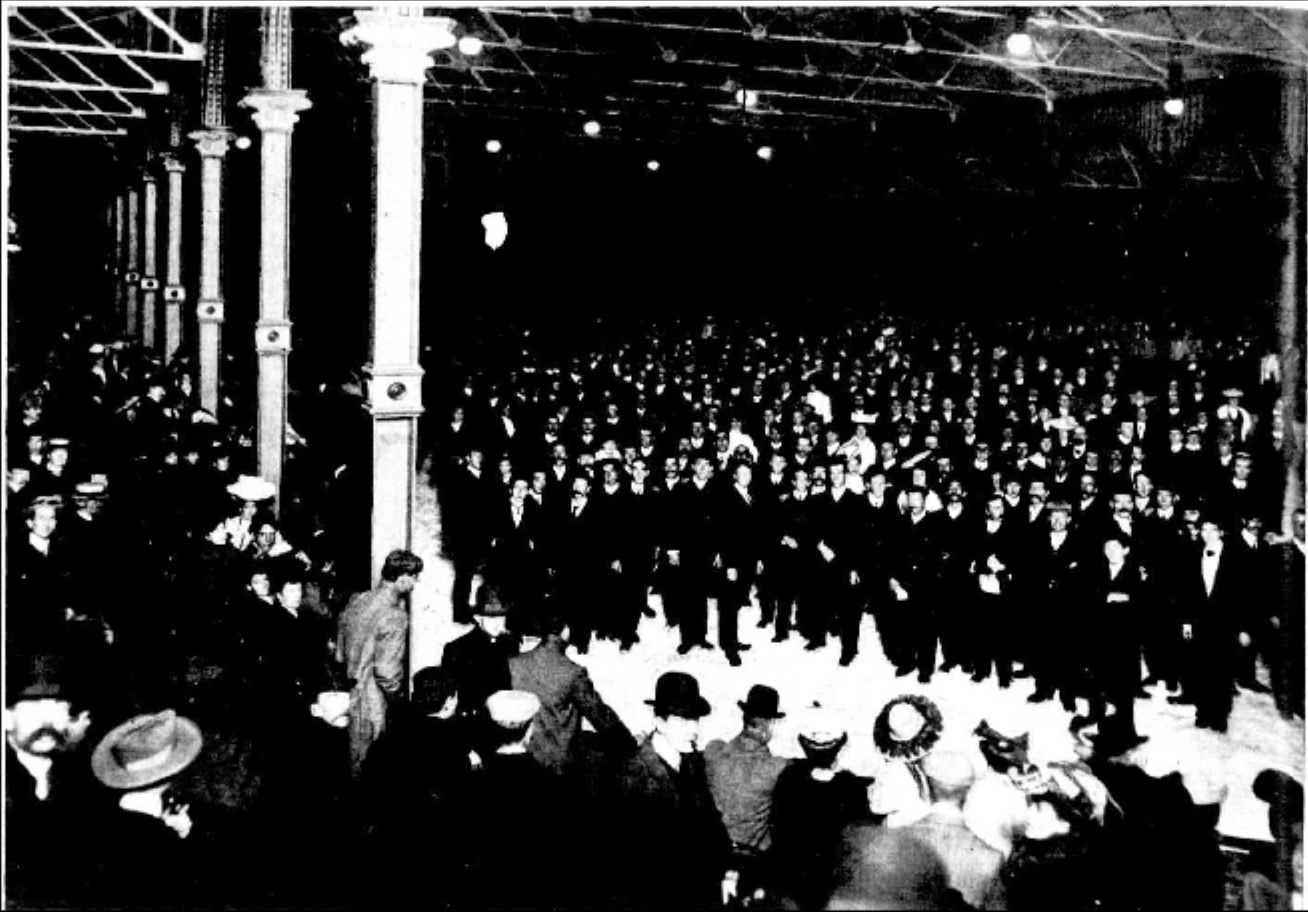
9 June 1906 the opening night of the Melbourne Glaciarium.

The Melbourne Glaciarium was officially opened at 3:00pm on 9 June 1906 with, then, Lord Mayor of Melbourne Sir Henry Weedon being part of the opening ceremony. It was estimated that 2500 people, invited by the directors, attended the opening of the Glaciarium. There was an exhibition of "free skating" conducted by Professor Brewer with 50 experienced skaters, accompanied by an orchestra. Later that evening the Glaciarium was opened to the general public and was almost over crowded. A break was provided when the Professor also led an exhibition of ice hockey.

=== Architecture and specifications ===
The building was designed by architects Ussher & Kemp (better known for their residential designs), and constructed out of brick with a rendered facade featuring large arches, using tinted cement. The block that the Glaciarium sat upon measured 30.48 meters (100 feet) by 60.96 meters (200 feet), and roofed by light steel trusses supported on columns joined by arches. The ice surface measured 54.9 metres (180 ft) by 27.4 metres (90 ft) and featured splayed corners, it was a suitable size by international ice hockey standards. There were 2 rows of reserved seating surrounding the rink surface for use at carnivals which also had heating by a network of hot water pipes running beneath the floor of these 2 rows. The west side of the venue featured a wide promenade behind the reserved seating section and behind that were the rows of general public seating. There was a designated smokers section called a "smokers retreat". The building also housed furnished ladies and gentleman's rooms both featuring offices for skate hire, administration offices and also a basement that was used as cold storage for produce.

The Glaciarium was illuminated by electrical lighting and used twelve 1800 candlepower lights and in the event of an emergency, there were five 1000 candlepower emergency lights connected to a generator that could be switched on quickly.

The ice rink was not much of a success, and the building was used as a picture theatre, 'West's Glaciarium' from 1907, re-opening in 1917.

In 1920, the Melbourne Glaciarium did not use the ice floor but due to the popularity of dancing it was converted into a Palais de Dance. The following year the Glaciarium arranged to meet the requirements of both dancers and ice skaters by keeping a large part of the floor for dancing. The dancing floor had enough room for an approximated 150 couples. The ice rink opened to ice skaters again on 5 May 1921 with upgrades to increase comfort. Radiators were fitted to the boxes for spectators as well as in the refreshments annex.

In March 1923, the Melbourne Ice and Refrigeration Company went into voluntary liquidation. The property was sold at auction by Baillieu Allard Pty Ltd. for £35500.00 to Cameron Rutherland and Seward Pty. Ltd.

In 1938 the building was renovated and modernised.

== Ice hockey ==
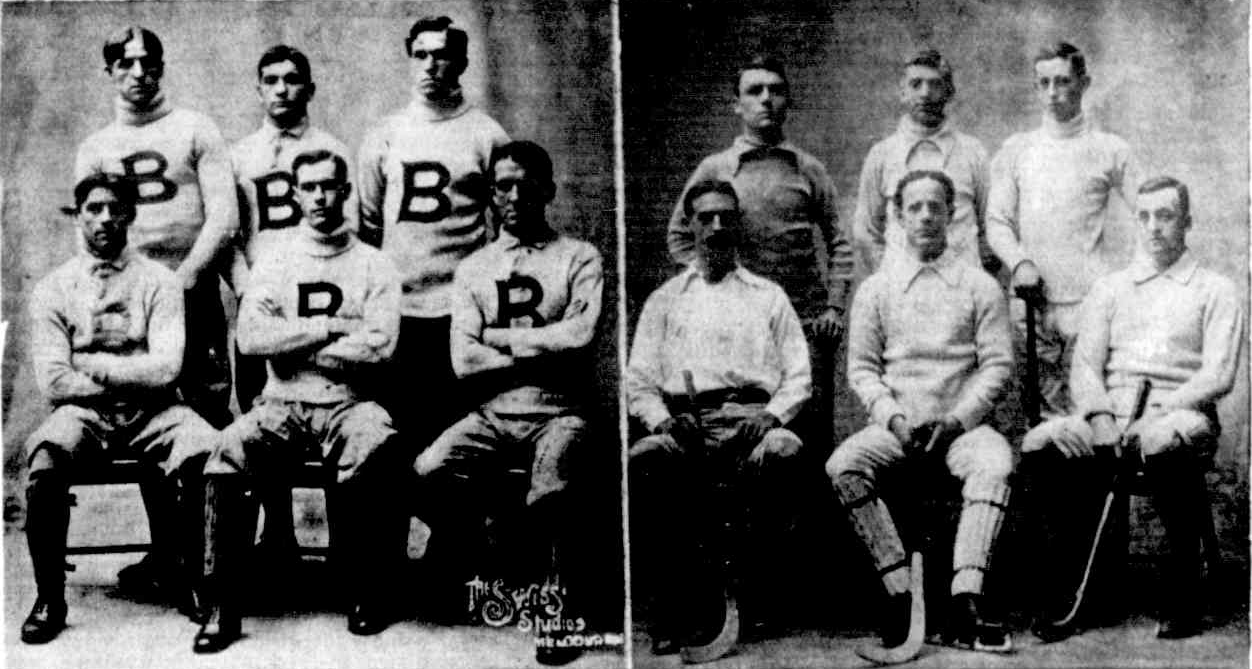
Both teams from the first Ice Hockey game in Australia, 17 July 1906. National Library of Australia

From the first days of being open, the Melbourne Glaciarium was intended to be a venue to hold ice hockey among other ice sports and the formation of hockey clubs began as the Glaciarium opened. In an interview published only 2 days after the Glaciarium had opened, H. Newman Reid spoke of the formation of hockey teams.

=== Evolving into ice hockey ===
The first recorded game of ice hockey in Australia was on Tuesday July 17, 1906 and was between a Victorian representative team and the American sailors from the visiting American warship, the USS Baltimore. The game was a deviation from the ice hockey already being played in Canada, so this first game is regarded as the first step in the evolution of the Australian game into the already established game of ice hockey. The teams had been practicing for 4 weeks leading up to the game. The game was a variation of the Canadian game being played at the time, it was played in two 15 minutes halves, using a red ball the size of a tennis ball and made from gutta-percha and curved heavy-headed sticks as used in English field hockey at the time. The teams consisted of 6 men per side with the following positions: Goal-Keeper, Half back, Center, Left Rush, and Right Rush. It is better said that this game was the first step of the Australian game evolving into contemporary ice hockey as it still differed from the already popular Canadian game at the time.

At the time, the Canadian game of ice hockey was being played with a puck, and included a 7th position called a rover and was played onside - which meant that forward passing was not allowed. The McGill Rules were first published on 27 February 1877 in the Montreal newspaper, The Gazette. It was essentially the same set of rules to the already established game of field hockey and even continued to use the word ball within the set of rules for ice hockey. One of the defining characteristics of the game of ice hockey at the time of the first Australian game was that it used a puck instead of a ball, this distinguished it from similar stick and ball games at the time such as bandy.

The American team was made up of:

- Warrant Machinist F. G. Randell (team captain) – center
- Seaman F. Brooks
- First-class Fireman T. H. Miller - half-back
- Seaman J. Benditti
- First Class fireman D. F. Kelly - goal-keeper
- Third Class Gunner's mate J. T. Connolly - rush

The Australian team was made up of:

- Herbert John Blatchly (team captain)
- Dunbar Poole - center
- James Service Thonemann - half back
- Ramsay Salmon - left rush
- Gordon David Langridge
- C. Kelly

Professor James Brewer was the umpire.

The Australian team were dressed in all white and the team from USS Baltimore wore white shirts with a large upper case black B on the front and center of the chest and grey trousers with red socks.

This game was held in the Melbourne Glaciarium and at 9:00pm a whistle blew to clear the public skaters from the ice surface so that the surface could be cleaned with scoops and brooms to remove the snowy covering generated by the public skating session before. The skill level of the Australians was not seen to be up to the level of the Americans as the American team had played as a team before against another American ship on a frozen river near Shanghai and defeated them. The Australians had never played as a team before but had the advantage of having been on the ice more recently than the American team. The game was hard fought and result of the game was a 1–1 tie. The USS Baltimore team were first to score when Mr. T.H. Miller scored goal but Mr. Dunbar Poole scored off a hard shot to tie up the game.

The Great White Fleet visited Melbourne, after having previously visited New South Wales, where they played ice hockey against a local team, using the larger ice hockey sticks and a puck made from a disc of wood. They also played with 7 men per side, as per the Canadian rules, this plaedy an important part to establishing the codified version of ice hockey in Australia rather than the Australian variant played before.

=== First ice hockey association in Australia ===
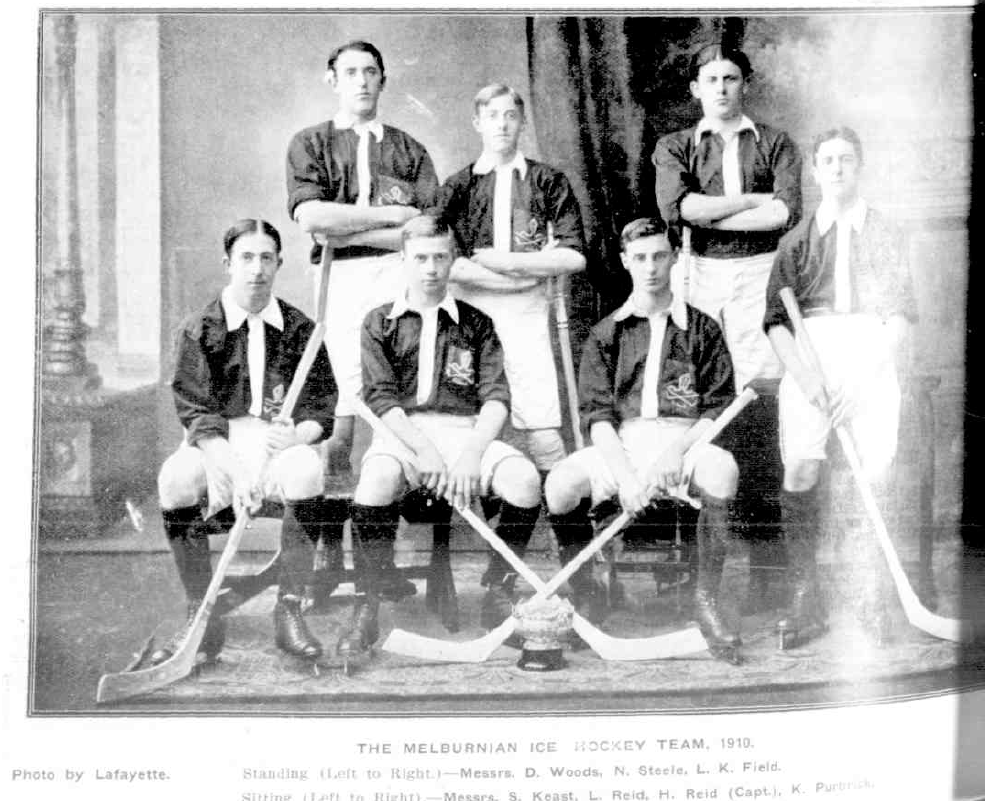
Melburnians IHC 1910 - Champions

12 September 1908 is the date of the formation of the first ice hockey association in Australia in a meeting at the Melbourne Glaciarium which occurred directly after an ice hockey game between the Brighton Ice Hockey Club and the Melburnians, which resulted in a 2–2 tie. The meeting was for the purpose of organising a club for the following season and the following committee was appointed: Lorimer, Ward, Errol F. Woods, W. Purbrick and Andrew Lambert Reid. Mr. Purbrick was nominated as honorable Treasurer and Mr. Reid was nominated as the Secretary.

The name of the association was the Victorian Amateur Ice Hockey Association (VAIHA). The association consisted of 4 ice hockey clubs:

- Beavers
- Brighton
- Glaciarium
- Melburnians

The Glaciarium Ice Hockey Club were the first ice hockey club to form in Australia, in 1907 and they are named for the Melbourne Glaciarium as the in house representative team. The remainder of the original 3 teams were formed in 1908. The Melburnians IHC consisted of the Melbourne Grammar School field hockey team and the team was named the Melburnians after the school. The Brighton IHC team were also named after a school, Brighton Grammar School.

The first state championship series in Australia was held in the Melbourne Glaciarium between 14 September 1909 - 27 September 1909. The final game was held on the evening of 27 September 1909 and was between the Glaciarium and Melburnians. The Glaciarium won the championship final by a score of 3-0 and were awarded gold medals.

== Other uses ==
The building was used as a movie theatre from 1906. It was also employed as a dance hall.

The building was a venue for basketball and gymnastics in the Melbourne Olympics in 1956.

== See also ==
- List of ice rinks in Australia
