= Sydney Glaciarium =

Former ice rink in New South Wales, Australia (1907–1955)

- Interactive map of Sydney Glaciarium
- Location: 849 George Street, Ultimo, New South Wales
- Coordinates: 33°53′01″S 151°12′10″E
- Capacity: 1500 (Gallery: 200)
- Surface: 51.82 by 23.16 meters (170.0 by 76.0 feet) wide.

Construction
- Opened: July 25, 1907
- Closed: 1955

The Sydney Glaciarium was the third indoor ice skating facility built in Australia and the first indoor ice skating rink built in New South Wales, located in Ultimo, New South Wales.

== History ==
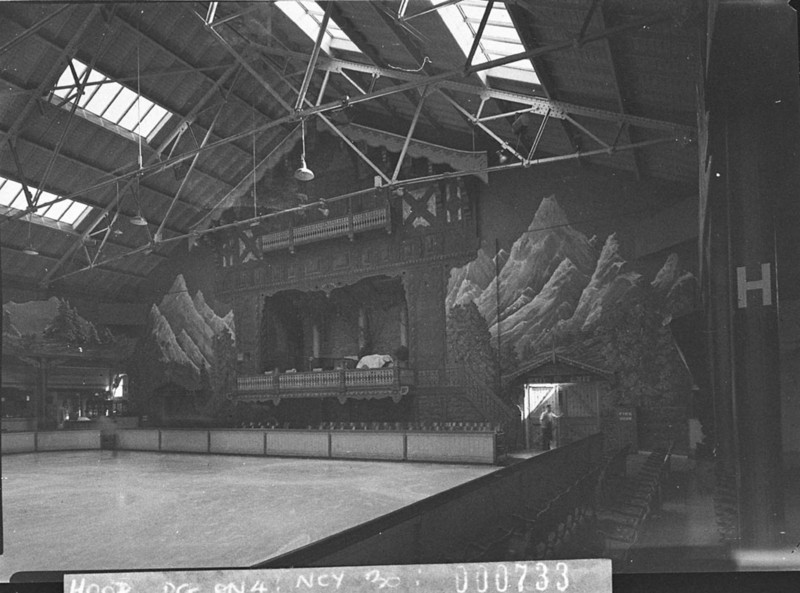
The interior of the Sydney Glaciarium, May 1940. State Library of New South Wales

A proposal for the construction of an ice skating rink, on the site of a former Cyclorama located on George Street, Sydney near the railway, was published 20 November 1906. The rink would feature large refrigeration works and cooling chambers for commercial use in the basement of the building. The architects appointed for the construction were Coxon and Cuthbert. The main entrance to George Street was widened to 23 feet (7.0 m) with a 20 feet (6.1 m) wide corridor with attached office suites and cloakrooms. The corridor would lead to the rink area on an incline with Ladies' and Gentleman's retiring rooms at the entry to the main area which was a 200 by 130 feet (61 by 40 m) space. The ice skating surface was 180 by 80 feet (55 by 24 m) with coiled pipes containing brine covered in 6 inches (150 mm) of water ice.

The Sydney Glaciarium was opened to the public on the afternoon of 25 July 1907 in front of an estimated 2000 spectators. The opening ceremony was performed by New South Wales Premier Mr. J. H. Carruthers.

The first season of ice skating and ice activities at the Sydney Glaciarium concluded at 11:00pm on 2 November 1907 with 800 skaters taking to the ice for the last time in the season. There was a signal given to cease skating and the skaters joined hands and sang Auld Lang Syne as well as the Australian National Anthem. Cheers were given to the rink manager, Dunbar Poole. The building would still be used until the next ice skating season began, as a wooden floor could be put down and the hall used for another purpose during the warm months of the year. use of the Glaciarium during the warmer season was secured by Mr. Thomas James West for the showing of films.

=== Pricing and session times ===
When the Sydney Glaciarium opened there were 3 sessions available during the day:

- Morning Session 10:00am to 12:00noon
- Afternoon Session 2:00pm to 5:00pm
- Evening Session 8:00pm to 10:30pm

Pricing for admission was 2 shillings.

Pricing for ice skate hire was 6 pence

=== Architecture and specifications ===
The Sydney Glaciarium was built on the site of the old Cyclorama, which was demolished. The ice floor was 51.82 meters (170.0 feet) long and 23.16 meters (76.0 feet) wide and the apex of the steel roof was 18.59 meters (61.0 feet) high when measured from the floor. The ice floor itself had a sheet of ice that was approximately 10.16 cm (4.00 in) thick and was transparent so that the estimated 11–13 km (6.8–8.1 mi) of piping was visible. The building was illuminated with electric lighting.

== Ice hockey ==
With the opening of the Sydney Glaciarium, ice hockey matches between Victoria and New South Wales representative teams began almost immediately. Teams from both states met up in the Sydney Glaciarium to play on 5 August 1907 at 10:15 pm. The New South Wales team won the game 3 - 0.

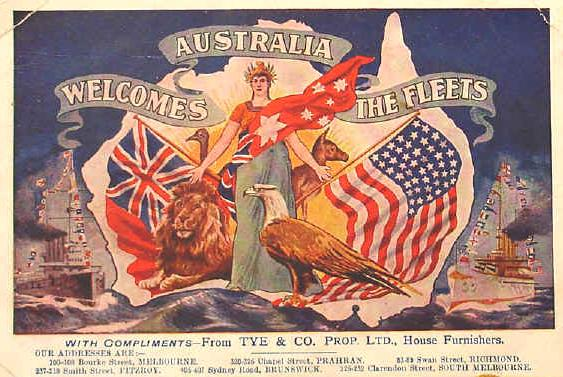
A 1908 postcard welcoming the fleet to Australia

In its second ice skating season, the Sydney Glaciarium management drew plans to facilitate ice hockey matches between an Australian team selected from ice skating patrons and teams drawn from the crew of various visiting fleet of American warships, known by the name Great White Fleet. Sydney was the first stop made by the fleet to Australia and invitations to the proposed hockey match were sent to the officers and petty officers of each warship, planning to host the match on the evening of their arrival on 20 August 1908. The first match that was arranged ended up being scheduled for the evening of 26 August 1907 at the Sydney Glaciarium. Though the American team had not been on skates for 3 years, they still managed to win the game 5 - 1 against the Australian team formed from Sydney Glaciarium patrons. The Australian team was first to score but the Americans would tie up the game in the first half. In the second half, the Americans would go on to score 4 more goals. An important aspect to this game was that the American players were using much larger hockey sticks than the local Australian team. The fleet would visit Melbourne afterwards where they would play ice hockey against a local team, presumably again, using the larger ice hockey sticks and a puck made from a disc of wood. Due to the Americans being short of 2 players, each team played with only 5 men per side but this would play an important part to establishing the codified version of ice hockey in Australia rather than the Australian variant played before.

== See also ==
- List of ice rinks in Australia
