= Le Mesurier =

Le Mesurier, LeMesurier, Lemesurier, Le Masurier and Le Messurier are variant spellings of a surname originating in the Channel Islands. Notable people with the name include:

- Alfred Le Messurier (1856–1927), shipping agent in Port Adelaide, South Australia
- David Hugh Le Messurier (1912–1976), Australian medical researcher
- Frederick Neill Le Messurier (1891–1966), Australian military doctor and pediatrician
- Gerald Le Mesurier (1914–1943), South African flying ace of World War II
- Henry LeMessurier (1848–1931), Newfoundland civil servant and politician
- James Le Mesurier (1971–2019), British army officer and co-founder of the White Helmets
- Joan Le Mesurier (1932–2021), English actress
- John Le Masurier (1917–2014), British athletics coach
- John Le Mesurier (1912–1983), English actor
- John Le Mesurier (born 1933/34), English carpet salesman and alleged conspirator in the Thorpe affair
- John Le Mesurier (Alderney) (1781–1843), last hereditary governor of Alderney, Channel Islands
- John Lemesurier (1826–1891), Canadian politician
- Kathleen Le Messurier (1898–1981), Australian tennis player
- Nicolas Le Messurier (fl. 1960s), British sound engineer
- Paul Le Mesurier (1755 – 9 December 1805), British merchant, politician and Lord Mayor of London
- Robert Le Masurier (1913–1996), Bailiff of Jersey, Channel Islands
- Robin Le Mesurier (1953–2021), British guitarist
- Alfred Roy Le Messurier (1886–1946), Australian rules footballer and timber merchant
- Thomas Le Mesurier (priest, born 1756) (1756–1822), British lawyer, cleric and polemicist
- Thomas Le Mesurier (priest, born 1785) (1785–1864), Anglican priest, Archdeacon of Malta
- Thomas Le Mesurier (aviator) (1897–1918), British World War I flying ace
- William LeMessurier (1926–2007), American structural engineer
