= Hempelmann =

Hempelmann or Hempleman is a surname. Notable people with the surname include:

- Alicia Hempleman-Adams (born 1989), British polar traveler
- David Hempleman-Adams (born 1956), British industrialist and adventurer
- Henry Valence Hempleman (1922–2006), British researcher
- Josef Hempelmann (1893–1967), German architect and politician
- John Hempleman (1933–2019), New Zealand motorcycle road racer
- Louis Hempelmann (1914–1993), American physician
