= Horton College =

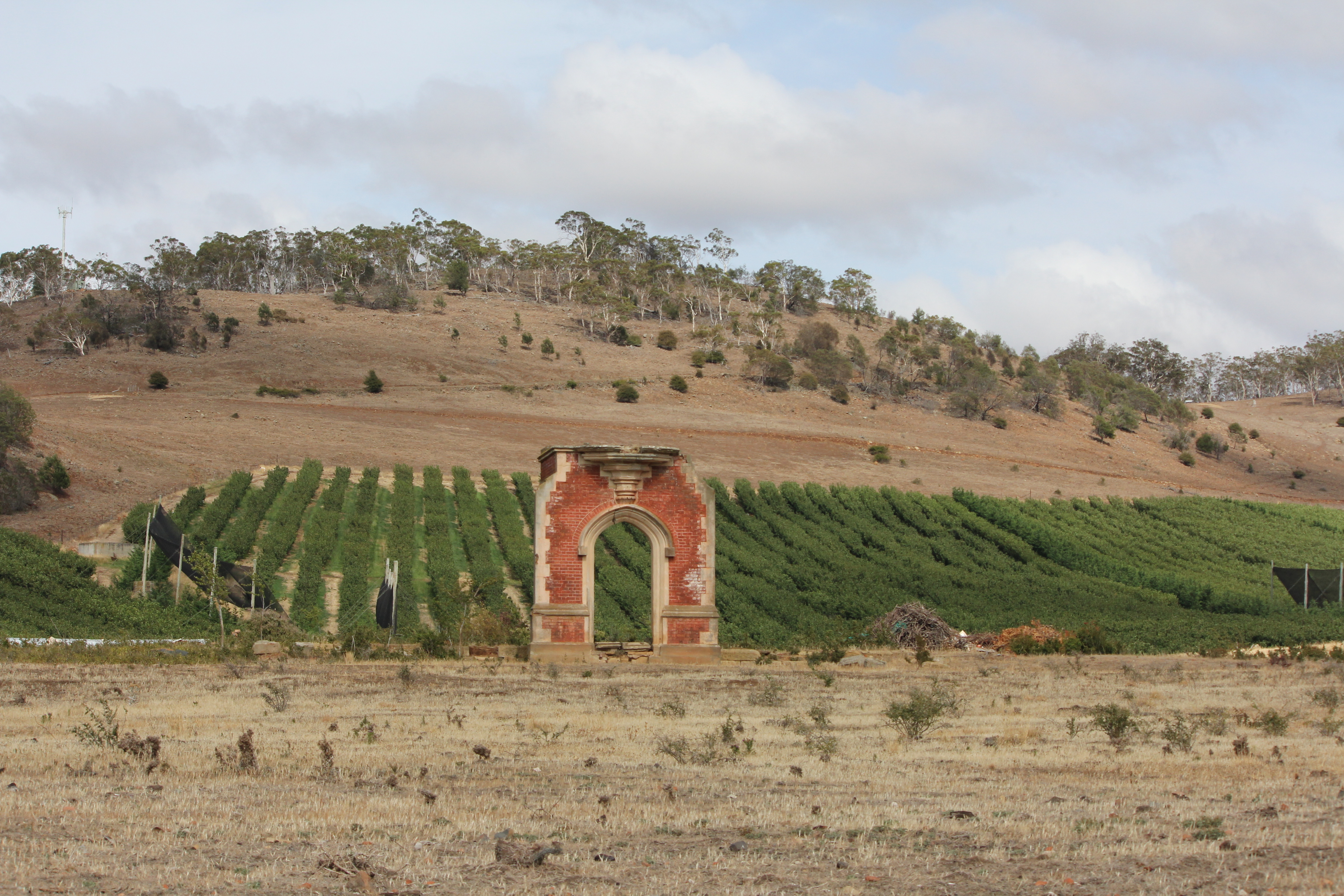
- Modern ruins of Horton College

Location
- Mona Vale, Ross, Tasmania; Australia
- Coordinates: 42°03′36″S 147°28′55″E

Information
- Type: Independent boarding school
- Motto: Latin: Perseverantia Palman Obtinebit (Perseverance will obtain the reward)
- Denomination: Wesleyan methodist
- Established: 1855
- Founder: Captain Samuel Horton
- Closed: 1894
- Gender: Boys

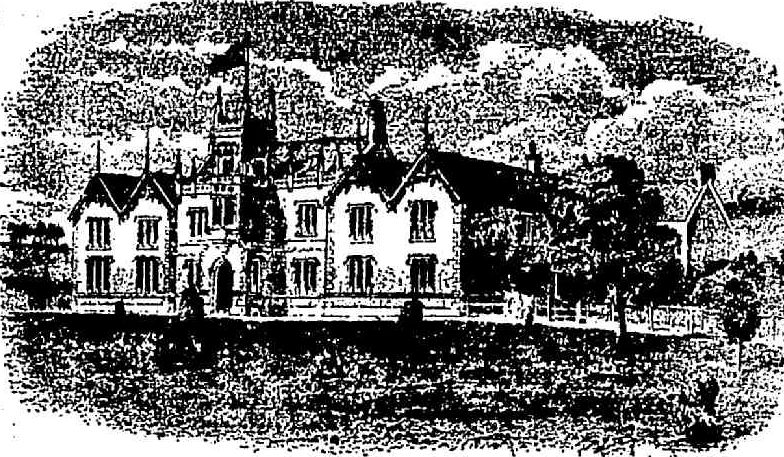
1937 sketch of the school

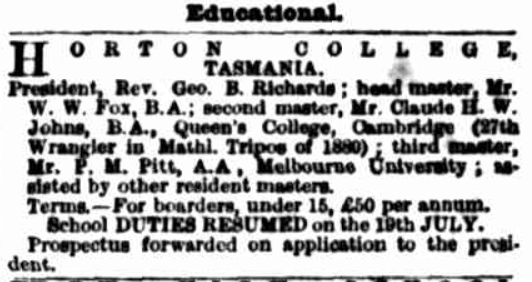
Display advertisement for Horton College, Tasmania, in: The Argus, Melbourne, 16 July 1880

Horton College was a 19th-century independent Wesleyan Methodist boys' boarding school, at Mona Vale near Ross, Tasmania, Australia. Founded by Captain Samuel Horton in 1855, the college closed in 1894; and during its brief period it was considered an extremely prestigious school, counting many of the region's landed families of the period as students.

Its first headmaster was John Manton, and for many years its motto was the Latin: Nil sine magno labore (Nothing without great exertion). This was replaced by the Latin: Perseverantia Palman Obtinebit (Perseverance will win the prize). The school building itself was an impressive red brick structure, designed by William Archer and its ruins were listed on the (now-defunct) Register of the National Estate from 1978.

== Closure ==
The college fell into financial ruin following a great economic depression that hit the state in the 1890s and the college was forced to shut due to debts. The college Board of Trustees, owning the building but not the land (which was in trust from Captain Horton's estate), handed the entire property back to his nephew. For many years the nephew's son lived in the school building but in 1917 he moved and the building was torn down to sell the materials. The bells from the building are still used by the Hutchins School, while the bricks were used to build Horton Cottage and parts of what is now Scotch Oakburn College. The building's entrance arch still stands and is visible from the highway.

== Notable alumni ==
- Members of the Archer family
- William Henry Burgess, member of Tasmanian parliament
- Colin Campbell, physician and champion Australian rules footballer with Essendon
- Crowther family
- Sir John Davies and Charles Davies, sons of the founder of The Mercury
- Arthur Groom, member of the Victorian parliament
- Kermode family
- William Lyne, Premier of New South Wales
- Alexander Malcolm, New Zealand member of parliament from Balclutha
- Albert Solomon, Premier of Tasmania

== Notable teachers ==
- Samuel Fiddian, mathematics master, later first principal of Prince Alfred College in Adelaide, South Australia and of Creswick Grammar School, Creswick, Victoria
- Claude Hermann Walter Johns (second master, 1880-84), later lecturer in Assyriology at Cambridge University and in Assyrian at King's College, London
