= Fiddian =

Fiddian is a surname. Notable people with the surname include:

- Charles Fiddian-Green (1898–1976), British cricketer
- Nic Fiddian-Green (born 1963), British sculptor
- Samuel Fiddian (1842–1904), Australian headmaster
- William Fiddian Moulton (1835–1898), British Methodist minister
