= David Hugh Le Messurier =

Australian physiologist

David Hugh Le Messurier (29 March 1912 – 9 November 1976), commonly referred to as Hugh Le Messurier, was a South Australian medical researcher.

== History ==
Le Messurier was born in Adelaide, the youngest son of shipping agent Alfred Le Messurier and only son of his second wife, Patricia Le Messurier, née O'Dea (–), nurse of his first wife Jane Sinclair Le Messurier, née Neill (1856–1908) during her terminal illness. His half-brothers include the timber merchant Roy Le Messurier and the paediatrician F. N. Le Messurier.

Following a tradition set by his father and brothers, Le Messurier was educated at St Peter's College where he excelled at sports and studies, and Adelaide University. He graduated BSc in physiology and organic chemistry in 1932 and BSc (Hons) in physiology and pharmacology in 1932. He was involved in pharmacological university at Johns Hopkins University, Baltimore. After graduating he assisted Dr C. H. Kellaway at the Walter and Eliza Hall Institute of Research in Melbourne, studying platypus venom.

In 1936 he married Patricia "Paddy" O'Dea ( – ) in England. Rev. K. J. F. Bickersteth, his old headmaster, officiated. They settled into a flat in Edinburgh, Scotland, where he continued his studies, graduating MB BCh in 1940. She had a daughter (Patricia) Anne around this time. A son, also named David Hugh Le Messurier, was born on 3 September 1941.

In July 1941 he enlisted with the RAAF at Laverton, Victoria, and a year later was appointed flight lieutenant in the medical branch, promoted to squadron leader on 1 December 1943. His work included investigations into causes of cadet failure and high altitude, low-pressure chamber research. He studied aviation medicine in Canada and the US. He was appointed Director of Aviation Medicine Research in September 1944. In January 1945, he was co-opted by the University of Adelaide as acting Professor of Physiology in place of Sir Cedric Stanton Hicks, who had become Director of Army Catering. After the War, and the return of Stanton Hicks to his substantive position, Le Messurier returned to post graduate lecturer in Physiology.

His subsequent work included studies of alkaloids associated with the plant pituri.

He died in Adelaide on 9 November 1976.

== Other interests ==
Le Messurier, showed promise as a painter and photographer

He was an expert tennis player and swimmer.
