= Cedric Stanton Hicks =

New Zealand-Australian chemist (1892–1976)

- Born: 2 June 1892; Mosgiel, New Zealand
- Died: 7 February 1976 (aged 83); Glen Osmond, South Australia
- Education: University of Otago
- Occupations: Professor, pharmacologist, physiologist

Sir Cedric Stanton Hicks (2 June 1892 – 7 February 1976) was an Australian pharmacologist, physiologist and nutritionist. He was Professor of Human Physiology and Pharmacology at the University of Adelaide.

== Biography ==
Hicks was born in Mosgiel, New Zealand; his grandmother, Adelaide Hicks, was a community midwife and nurse in the area. He was educated first at Otago Boys' High School and the University of Otago, and after being awarded a Beit medical research fellowship in 1923, he travelled to England and studied at Trinity College, Cambridge. Under the fellowship, he also carried out research in Switzerland, Italy, Germany and the United States of America. He took up a fellowship and lectureship at the University of Adelaide in 1926. In January 1927 he was appointed to a new chair of physiology and pharmacology at the University, a post he held until 1957.

During World War II Hicks founded the Australian Army Catering Corps and served as its commander from 1943. Hicks worked closely with the Australian Army Catering Corps as an adviser on nutrition and was on the Defence Department's Scientific Advisory Committee as its advisor on foodstuffs. Hugh Le Messurier acted in his university position for the remainder of the War.

In 1953, Hicks co-authored a book on organic farming with colonel H. F. White, Life From the Soil. A prolific author, in 1972 he published a book on his wartime catering experience under the title, Who Called the Cook a Bastard?.

He died in 1976 in Glen Osmond, South Australia.

== Selected publications ==
- Life From the Soil (with H. F. White, 1953)
- Who Called the Cook a Bastard? (1972)
