= James Robin =

Businessman of colonial South Australia (1817–1894)

James Robin (pronounced ROE-bin) (14 November 1817 – 23 July 1894) was a prominent businessman in the early days of colonial South Australia. Several of his descendants were significant, in the Methodist Church and other fields. Also worthy of mention are his brothers Charles (c. 1826 – 27 November 1872) and Theophilus Robin (c. 1830 – 19 September 1874).

Their father, Nicholas Robin (1788? – 5 January 1873), a citizen of Guernsey, was married to Esther de Quetteville (c. 1819 – 20 August 1855), daughter of Rev. Jean de Quetteville "The Apostle of French Methodism". He died at his home at St Jacques, Guernsey.

== History ==
James Robin (14 November 1817 – 23 July 1894) was born on Guernsey and educated at Elizabeth College. Around 1835 he left for Brazil, where he spent six years with the firm of Bramley Moore & Co, returned to Liverpool, where he established a shipping agency, and married a daughter (1820 – c. 1 August 1907) of Thomas Rowland of Gravesend, in 1844.

In May 1851 he arrived in Adelaide, where he set up a wholesale import business Robin & Le Bair (see below).

In 1866 he was appointed vice-consul for Brazil, an honorary position he held until his death.

He had five sons and three daughters. At least three of his sons attended J. L. Young's Adelaide Educational Institution. Those who featured at prizegivings were James (from 1856 to 1861), Rowland (1858 to 1864) and Henry (1858 to 1865).

He suffered from a speech defect which prevented him from public speaking, but was an ardent Methodist church-goer, and was the prime mover behind the formation of Prince Alfred College at the Wesleyan Lecture Hall, Pirie Street. He was, with brother Theophilus, on the building committee in 1867 when Prince Alfred laid the foundation stone of the main building at Kent Town. Many boys from the various branches of the Robin family left their mark in the academic and sporting records of "P.A.C.".

- Eldest daughter (Charlotte) Sophie ( – 25 August 1924) married Samuel Fiddian M.A. ( – 5 January 1904) on 9 January 1872. He was the first headmaster (from 1869 to 1870) of Prince Alfred College, then proprietor and principal of Creswick Grammar School from 1872 to 1903. They lived in Creswick, Victoria.

- Rev. James Rowland Fiddian (13 July 1873 – 20 February 1943) MSc was Moderator of the Presbyterian Church of Victoria from 1938 to 1940.
- Samuel Fiddian, jr. (c. 1877 – 13 September 1934), married his cousin, Margaret N. Robin, eldest daughter of Henry Nicholas Robin, on 21 March 1906. He became part-owner of James Robin & Co. in 1909
- Reta Fiddian (1885–1896) drowned with her cousin Maurice Robin at Ocean Grove, Victoria on 28 December 1896.)

- Eldest son (Rev.) James De Quetteville Robin ( – 28 July 1900) married Mary Waterhouse on 15 October 1873.

- Reginald James Robin ( – 21 November 1944) married Mabel Berryman on 19 March 1913.

- Reginald and Mary's son Gordon de Quetteville Robin (17 January 1921 – 21 September 2004) was a renowned geophysicist in Antarctica, for whom Robin Peak is named.

- Maurice (1888–1896), was one of two children who drowned at Ocean Grove 28 December 1896.

- Second son Rowland Barbenson Robin (1848–1931) married Mary Friend Whitney Canaway (6 March 1860 – 6 February 1949) on 25 April 1883 He succeeded his father as vice-consul of Brazil.

- Philip de Quetteville "Phil" Robin (10 August 1884 – 28 April 1915) played Australian Rules football for Norwood, and was killed at Gallipoli during World War I.
- Prof. Rowland Cuthbert Robin (4 August 1898 – 19 June 1951) was a civil engineer whose career was focused on structural engineering. After winning a government bursary based on his performance at the Higher Public Examination in 1916, he enrolled in the engineering school at the University of Adelaide. In 1920, he was admitted to the degree of BE, granted the Diploma in Applied Science in Engineering, and awarded the Angas Engineering Scholarship. He travelled to study and gain practical experience in the UK and then the US. Whilst in the US, he met Frances Elizabeth Sutton. The couple married in 1925, returned to Adelaide in 1926, and had three children. In 1930, he was appointed a lecturer under Robert Chapman at the University of Adelaide and was promoted to Professor of Civil Engineering in 1939.

- Third son Henry Nicholas Robin (c. 1849 – 16 December 1924) married Ada Marian Keeling (d. 23 December 1948) on 21 February 1883

R. B. Robin and H. N. Robin were senior employees of James Robin & Co.

- Fifth son Allison Bedford Robin (30 September 1860 – 16 July 1942) was in the first intake of students at Roseworthy Agricultural College in 1885 under Prof. John D. Custance.

He was a progressive and outspoken farmer and orchardist in Nuriootpa; Secretary of the Nuriootpa branch of the Central Agricultural Bureau and Secretary of the Angaston branch of the Fruitgrowers' Association. Photo of A. B. Robin He developed several fruit varieties at his "Para Grove" nursery, including the "Corella" pear, which was for a time grown commercially.

- Youngest son Vincent John Robin MRCS, LRCP (1868 – 2 January 1904) was a surgeon in Port Douglas, Queensland. He was educated at Samuel Fiddian's Grammar School in Creswick, Victoria, and the University of Adelaide 1886. He married Sarah Ann "Daisy" Buchanan on 28 June 1901.

=== James Robin & Co. ===
In May 1851 James Robin set up a wholesale import business "Robin & Le Bair" in Grenfell Street with Nicholas P. Le Bair (died 9 April 1854), frequently styled "Captain Le Bair", employing the schooner Fame (he had been captain of the William, registered in Guernsey). On Le Bair's death, he assumed control of the business, then in partnership with sons Henry Nicholas Robin and Rowland Barbenson Robin as James Robin & Co.
On 12 February 1910, fire destroyed the two-storey warehouse on the corner of Chesser and Grenfell streets. In 1909 the business was taken over by S. Fiddian (grandson of James Robin) and Strachan, and the building by Richard Smith, a principal of Harris Scarfe

== Charles ==
James Robin's brother, Charles Robin (c. 1826 – 27 November 1872), was a land dealer with an office in Gilbert Street, Adelaide. He arrived in South Australia in October 1851, a few months after his brother James.

In the London office of Robert Torrens in 1851, with fellow Guernsey citizens James Thoume and N. P. Le Bair, Charles took a lease on the Kent Town section of Adelaide, then known as "Dr. Kent's Section", with an option to convert to freehold. He arrived in Adelaide in October to find that brother James had entered a business partnership with Captain Le Bair. In 1854, Charles, his brother James and Henry Ayers purchased part of the section from Dr. Benjamin Archer Kent without reference to his previous partners. This became the subject of complex litigation in 1858 brought on by Thoume and an associate William Frederick Blanchard. The suit was eventually dropped on condition of Charles meeting some of his opponents' costs.

He returned to Guernsey soon after being declared insolvent. Properties in Adelaide and Melbourne (shops in Swanston, La Trobe and Elizabeth streets) which he owned, or had mortgages on, had been liquidated for a fraction of their purchase price without his knowledge. Other properties in Port Adelaide and Port Augusta were liquidated after his death in Les Rohais, Guernsey.
