= Theophilus Robin =

Australian merchant (c. 1830–1874)

Theophilus Robin (pronounced ROE-bin) (c. 1830 – 19 September 1874) was a pioneer timber merchant in the early days of colonial South Australia. He was a brother of prominent businessman James Robin (1817–1894) and Adelaide land agent Charles Robin (c. 1826 – 27 November 1872).

== History ==
Robin was born in Guernsey, a son of Nicholas Robin (c. 1788 – 5 January 1873), and his wife Esther Robin, née De Quetteville (c. 1819 – 20 August 1855). She was a daughter of Rev. Jean de Quetteville "The Apostle of French Methodism".

In 1854 he took over the Lipson Street, Port Adelaide warehouse of S. R. Clarke & Co.

He was a partner in Padman & Co to 1864, then as timber merchant, built up premises on corner of Lipson Street and Port Road as Sarnia Timber Yard and Sarnia Steam Mills. In 1859 Theophilus Robin and shipping agent Peter Le Messurier formed a partnership as Robin & Le Messurier. The partnership was dissolved on 31 August 1872. leaving Theophilus to concentrate on the Sarnia Timber business.

He was a member of the Adelaide Philosophical Society and the Wesleyan Methodist church and for many years superintendent of the Archer Street Wesleyan Sunday School.

Theophilus Robin married Stella Ann Ansell (c. 1837 – 19 July 1916) on 1 March 1855. Their children included:

- Theophilus Hedley Robin (1859 – 12 June 1940) was a partner with Simon Harvey, Malcolm P. Reid (1882–1876) (son of Malcolm D. Reid) and William Haslam in Globe Timber Mills around 1920.
- Percy Ansell Robin MA (Lond), D.Litt. (1861 – 28 May 1937), was educated at Prince Alfred College. He was a fine cricketer, playing for Queensland, and had a distinguished career as a teacher in private schools, including Ipswich Grammar, where he was appointed Classical Master in 1886 and acting head two years later, and headmaster of the Church of England Grammar School, Ballarat in 1910, He was the author of Animal Lore in English Literature John Murray London 1932

Theophilus died of erysipelas following an infected boil on his leg, leaving a widow and nine children. His widow took on Theodore Hack as business partner, styling the business Robin & Hack. It was known simply as "Hack's Timber Yard" on 11 November 1884 when fire broke out, destroying not only the timber but woodworking machinery worth £5,000.
