= H. L. Conran =

Henry Lewis Conran (26 December 1861 – 25 December 1924), generally known as H. L. Conran but Harry to his friends, was an Australian pastoralist and stockbroker.

== History ==
Conran was born in Melbourne, educated in England and joined the Royal Navy, passing out into HMS Britannia in 1865. At one stage he and the future Admiral Creswell were shipmates, both midshipmen.

Conran's father was Captain (later Lieut.-Col.) Lewis Charles Conran (c. 1820 – 10 January 1893) of the 11th Regiment, who arrived in Tasmania in the 1840s, moved to Victoria and served as ADC to Governor La Trobe in 1850 and was sergeant-at-arms of the first Legislative Council. He married Catherine Spencer Wills ( – 27 August 1884) in Melbourne in 1851, returned to England in 1852. He returned to Australia in 1874, and settled in Geelong, living at "Barrabool House" and farm of about 400 acres (160 ha) in Highton. He married again in 1888 to Catherina Sarah McLeod and died five years later. She died 21 August 1941 in Nuwara Eliya, Sri Lanka.

"Barrabool Farm" was divided into smaller farms in 1897 and is now mostly residential; the house is now at 13 Pepperdine Way.

He left the Navy in 1872 and with brother Thomas Wills Conran was engaged in sheep farming in Queensland. They bought the lease to Yamala station on the Peak Downs from Lamb and Black, and in 1877, as Conran Bros & Co., purchased 4,749 acres (1,922 ha) of the property. and had a substantial interest in the nearby Gordon Downs station, spending a great deal on improvements. In 1879 he help found the Peak Downs Turf Club, of which Weld-Blundell of Gordon Downs was president. He lost heavily in the 1881–1886 droughts, and had no sooner restocked Gordon Downs when a bushfire caused further losses.

His brother Tom made a fortune from trading Broken Hill stocks, and in 1901 purchased a seat in the Stock Exchange of Adelaide. Conran followed him to South Australia, but had little success as an investor until the gold rush to Coolgardie and Kalgoorlie, when he made a substantial fortune. He took up residence in Pier Street, Glenelg and an office in Cowra Chambers, 23 Grenfell Street. Historian A. T. Saunders' first job was in his office.

In 1893 the brothers founded the Conran Syndicate that financed the Cosmopolitan Mines in the Menzies – Niagara area of Western Australia; other members were G. A. Stockfeld (their prospector), R. C. Baker, S. Newland, William Milne, John Crozier, A. Waterhouse, W. Thorold Grant. In 1894 he acted as Adelaide broker for the "Wealth of Nations" and "Brilliant Reward" mines, Coolgardie. He was a shareholder and creditor of The Coolgardie Courier, which became insolvent and he petitioned for its assets to be liquidated.

He left for England, where he established a home, "Courabelle", at Westgate-on-Sea, Kent, but returned to Australia annually. The Conran family was on good terms with the German royal family, and on request from the Crown Princess, he presented her with a pair of kangaroos with joey, through Ernest Albert Le Souef of Perth Zoo.

He died after several years of ill-health and was buried in the Hampstead Cemetery.

== Family ==
Conran married Mary Louisa "Minnie" Molle (1865– ) of Brisbane on 30 September 1886. Her father was Col. Molle of the 43rd Regiment, stationed in Hobart.

- Major Eric Lewis Conran (c. 1887 – 6 January 1924), a distinguished soldier who joined the 3rd Squadron of the Royal Flying Corps in 1914 and was probably the first Australian to be awarded the newly-instituted Military Cross. He died after surgery to remove a cerebral tumor.
- Nancy Conran married Major (later Lieut.-Col.) W(adham) Heathcote Diggle DSO, MC, of the Grenadier Guards. Nancy was awarded the Croix de Guerre for her work with the French Red Cross canteen at the Front.
- Alleyne Conran (–) married the Hon. Mountjoy Upton (c. 1894–), son of Henry Upton, 4th Viscount Templetown. She became Viscountess Templetown in October 1939.

His brothers included Thomas Wills Conran (1850 – 15 October 1915), of the 26th Cameronians, married Evelyn Mary Ford in 1878, later mining expert of Adelaide; Charles Conran (1854–1939) married Helen Brock in 1897; youngest Marcell Conran (1855–1935) of Geelong and Macedon. He married Ida McLachlan in 1881.

Father M. W. T. Conran of the Anglican Cowley Brotherhood, who read the funeral service, was a cousin.
