= Australian Army Catering Corps =

Administrative corps of the Australian Army

- Cap badge of the Australian Army Catering Corps
- Active: 12 March 1943 – present
- Country: Australia
- Branch: Australian Army
- Motto: "We sustain"
- Colors: Slate grey and yellow
- March: The Roast Beef of Old England & Tavern in the Town

Commanders
- Notable commanders: Sir C. Stanton Hicks

The Australian Army Catering Corps (AACC) is the corps within the Australian Army that is responsible for preparing and serving of meals. The corps was established on 12 March 1943.

== History ==
The feeding of the soldier was and still is a unit commander's responsibility. Historically, unit feeding was dependent upon foraging in the enemy's territory, the baggage train being as small as possible. If a commander failed in his task, his company merely melted away. Cause and effect were apparent.

=== Before and During World War One ===
In the early days of the Australian Army cooks were drawn from the ranks of a Regiment. Unfortunately the kitchen was used as a dumping ground for the problem soldiers, rarely did a soldier of any quality or ability volunteer for this despised trade. The quality of the food produced by these regimental cooks can be best summarized by the infamous World War I catch cry "Who called the cook a bastard?" the retort being "Who called the bastard a cook?"

World War I saw the introduction of new style of fighting on the battlefields, trench warfare. Soldiers fighting in the trenches were given hot meals, when possible, under the cover of darkness, during the day they fended for themselves and ate bully beef and biscuits and contrary to all the stories being passed down, they were also provided cheese, jam and bread. When relieved from the trenches soldiers were fed hot meals in the rest areas at the rear. The legend of Bully Beef and Biscuits was born.

Camp kitchens, towed on a horse drawn cart often had to be sited well behind the trenches, as the smoke from the woodfires would attract artillery attention. Soldiers were often awarded bravery medals simply for being able to deliver rations to the frontline, in the difficult and often impassable terrain under fire.

=== 1920s and 1930s - Interwar Period ===
In between the two World Wars the feeding of the peacetime Militia or Citizens Military Forces (CMF) at their brief annual camps did little to enhance the reputation of Army cooks or food. Feeding in these camps came to depend upon the employment of civilian cooks (shearers' cooks etc.) who were well paid and their general lack of culinary skills fixed firmly in the minds of the officers and men the concept that the cook was a deplorable necessity. The Militia soldier was reared on this idea, and accepted indifferent feeding as one of the least attractive aspects of military life.

At the outbreak of World War II the reputation of the unit cook was still at an all time low. Qualified Cookery Instructors, members of the Australian Instructional Corps were running cookery courses, however only the worst soldiers of the regiment were being offered up for training. Despite the fact that these courses were run continuously as soon as the men had completed their cooks training they returned to their former duties as a rifleman, driver etc. It was rare for a qualified chef or catering tradesperson to volunteer because of the low status accorded to them.

=== 1940s - World War Two and Formation of the Corps ===
In July 1939 Sir Cedric Stanton Hicks, a prominent Professor of Human Physiology and Pharmacology at the University of Adelaide was appointed the District Catering Supervisor of the 4th Military District in Adelaide. This appointment proved to be a peculiar quirk of fate for the Australian Army, as it brought a scientist into direct contact with the feeding problems at its most important point, the kitchen. He took practical steps to ensure that the essential nutrients were included in the ration scales and were retained throughout the cooking process to be consumed by the soldier.

Hicks noted that the Cookery Schools were having a very difficult task trying to train sufficient cooks from the unsuitable personnel offered up by units to provide satisfactory messing in the many training camps which had been established all over Australia. He recognized that to improve the feeding of the Army it was necessary to get good soldiers to be cooks. Improve the standard of cooking equipment used in the field and in barracks, improve the standard of training with a more scientific approach and improve the quality of the rations made available to the soldier.

There is an old Army saying, "It is not what you know, but who you know." This certainly applied to Hicks. His first task was to raise the standard of the cook. He did this by recruiting catering managers direct from the civilian industry. He wrote proposals and gained support to have suitably qualified cooks paid a tradesman rate and to be promoted. Seems normal enough today, consider the opposition at the time though. When the proposal to upgrade suitable trained cooks to the rank of Sergeant and Corporal was circulated one senior officer actually wrote as one of his objections that the presence of these Sergeant Cooks would be embarrassing to the Sergeants Mess.

Through Hick's influence, barracks kitchens were upgraded: a new type of cooker, the static Wiles Steam Cooker, being introduced into the service. After a lot of submissions he and the Wiles family were finally able to persuade the Australian Army to use the Australian designed and built Wiles Mobile Steam Kitchen too.[4] Training was improved and instead of soldiers traveling to Cookery schools mobile training was commenced with cookery instructors going to the units. Ration scales were improved through the introduction of additional commodities selected for their nutritional value.

In 1942 Hicks, now a Lieutenant Colonel, put up a proposal to form the Australian Army Catering Corps. As expected there was initially considerable opposition, however eventually this was approved and on 12 March 1943 the Australian Army Catering Corps was raised with Sir C. Stanton Hicks as its first Director of Catering.

Hick's philosophy for the formation of the Corps then and it remains true today is "The primary function of the Catering Corps is to ensure the most efficient use of rations and through that provide the maximum health and stamina to the troops." Out of this philosophy the Corps got its motto "We Sustain". The AACC is a service that provides an extension of the Commander's power to discharge in detail his/her responsibility for the feeding of the soldier. AACC personnel are first and foremost members of the unit they are posted to. Catering personnel are "detached", not "attached".

With the formation of the Catering Corps the shortage of cooks was reduced. At the conclusion of World War II the AACC Corps strength was 17,600 cooks.

After World War II the Army downsized and what was known as the Interim Army came into being. In 1948 the Directorate of Catering was disbanded and the Catering Corps came under the control of the Directorate of Supplies and Transport the Royal Australian Army Service Corps. This was considered a retrograde step as the supplier of all the rations in effect technically dictated catering policy to the cooks, customer satisfaction was guaranteed, as it was difficult to complain about quality etc. to your superiors. The biggest task for the AACC at this time was providing catering staff to serve in Japan with the British Commonwealth Occupation Force (BOCF).

=== 1950s - Korea War and Malaya Emergency ===
With the outbreak of hostilities with the Korean War, the men from BOCF were the first to go. As they did their time in that theatre they were rotated back through Japan. The British Army also set up a Cookery School at Kure in Japan and many Australian soldiers completed their basic training there.

Whilst in Korea the cooks of the Australian Army worked under extreme climatic conditions, it was either very hot or very cold; their kitchens were normally just tents and in the main units were mobile. The front could change several times in a week. They operated with the same field cooking equipment used during World War II with some improvisation because of the lack of solid fuel (firewood). Where possible these cooks swapped or stole modern cooking equipment from the Americans. Rations for Australian soldiers were a mixture of American and British, a large percentage being canned. During this period the Australian Army again expanded, the AACC re-enlisted many cooks who saw service during World War II. Another source of manpower for the AACC was former Army Catering Corps cooks from the British Army who transferred over direct.

During the 1950s in Australia a large amount of the Army's resources were directed toward the training of conscripts. The myth of Army cooking continued, one still hears the tales of how they sat in foxholes and only had bully beef and hard tack biscuits to eat on Puckapunyal Range.

At the conclusion of the fighting in Korea Australian soldiers were then sent to Malaya for the Emergency. This was a much sought after posting by all soldiers because they were able to take their families with them and in a lot of cases their standard of living was higher than they would have experienced back in Australia. Up to this period the Australian soldier had not been a very adventurous eater, but here in Malaya they developed a taste for curries and some Chinese cuisine. Naturally the unit cooks learnt how to prepare these dishes and on their return to Australia they passed this new skill on the other members of the Corps.

During the 1950s and 1960s basic cookery training was conducted in Trade Training Centres, which were situated in most capital cities. These centres were under the control of the RAASC and also trained drivers, clerks and store men. All advanced training for AACC Corporals and above was conducted at the RAASC Centre at Puckapunyal. All training kitchens were modified ex-World War II buildings not suitable for the task, however, full credit must be given to the instructors of the day - despite this, they achieved excellent results. The early 1960s heralded a new era for the AACC; during this period many new kitchens and messes were being built with modern up to date cooking equipment. It was a period where the AACC stopped teaching their basic cooks how to kill and pluck a chicken and gone were the days of shelling wheat bags of fresh peas, deep freezers were issued and so were frozen chickens and quick frozen peas.

It was during this era that Australians became more food conscious, no doubt influenced by the influx of migrants and tourists. TV was now in Australian homes, Graham Kerr the super chef was the in show and suddenly the cook had an elevation in status. Soldiers enlisting now wanted to be cooks, they were better educated and most importantly they were motivated. In the early 1960s the AACC were issued with the new US patent M37 Range Fuel Cooking Outfits and the Range Outfit Field Gasoline and the Immersion Heaters. Compared with the Hydra-burners, the Wiles Steam Cookers, Soya stoves and the Flower stoves this equipment was the state of the art. Interesting to note though that this was the very same equipment that cooks borrowed or stole from the Americans in Korea back in the early 1950s. At about this time the famous Wiles Steam Kitchens were retired from Service.

=== 1960s - Confrontation in Borneo and Vietnam War ===
In mid-1960 Australian soldiers were sent to Borneo for what was known as the Confrontation. This proved to be a lead up for the Army and the AACC in its preparation for South Vietnam and the Vietnam War. Also in the mid-1960s National Service was reintroduced, this time for a two-year period. To train these soldiers who were allocated to the AACC old Army barracks were converted to training kitchens at Bonegilla, Victoria. This temporary facility trained 400 National Servicemen as cooks a year and remained in operation for a period of 10 years.

The introduction of National Service not only increased the size of the AACC but it raised the standards of tradesmen to a new level. During the period that National Service was in the AACC were fortunate to have allocated to them many highly skilled tradesmen who had completed their apprenticeships in numerous different countries. A high proportion of these skilled chefs transferred to the Australian Regular Army and went on to become the senior officers and NCO's of the AACC.

In 1965 all stewards in the Army were transferred from the RAASC to the AACC. The addition of this trade to the AACC further enhanced the Catering Service provided to the Army as now all catering tasks were performed by AACC personnel.

From 1965 until the withdrawal of Forces from South Vietnam in 1972 AACC personnel served with every unit including Australian Army Training Team Vietnam. During this prolonged conflict AACC members in addition to their normal catering duties carried out military type duties in major operations perimeter patrols. Private Connors, a member of 5th Battalion, Royal Australian Regiment Catering Platoon, died as the result of wounds received whilst on operations.

Rations provided during the Vietnam War were in the main American, as time went by these were supplemented with Australian favourites such as Vegemite, Aussie sausages and curry powder. Army cooks demonstrated their ingenuity by making bakers ovens out of 44-gallon drums and designing bain-maries to keep food hot. Their bread making skills improved and because it was such a mobile war whenever the helicopters did a resupply of ammunition and water the cooks would make up fresh cold meat and salad bread rolls for their troops in the field. The first stop for the diggers on their return from ops was to go past the kitchen, give some rude comment to the baitlayer and thank them for the food. There are many complaints about Vietnam in general and it is natural for a soldier to 'bitch' but the only real complaints about food in Vietnam has been about the ration packs. They were given "Bully Beef", that too was a supplement sourced from Australia at the request of the diggers. Was the myth of Bully finally put to bed?

When National Service ceased in the early 1970s the AACC had to have a huge restructure because a large percentage of Privates and Corporals left the service, there were too many Sergeant Cooks. Up until this time Field Force units used Regimental Sergeants to carry out the role of Mess Supervisors in their Officers and Sergeants Messes, these positions were offered up to the AACC. Many Sergeant Cooks were cross-trained as Supervisor of Army Messes. During this period units training was concentrated on the defence of Australia. This mobile role initially present problems for the catering platoons but were overcome with the introduction of TV dinners as a means of getting hot food to the soldier in the front.

=== 1970s - End of National Service ===
In 1973 The Royal Australian Army Service Corps was disbanded and the Royal Australian Corps of Transport (RACT) was formed. In 1974 the Director of Catering Army was restored and The Army School of Catering was formed at Puckapunyal. The shackles of the RAASC had finally been broken. The Army School of Catering was the only Australian Army Catering Corps unit in the Army and the first since World War II. During this period new Eaton style uniforms for the stewards were introduced and the cooks were able to finally hand in their all white uniforms for new chef's uniforms to conform to the catering industry standards.

In 1977 the new Catering Instruction Building was opened in Tobruk Barracks in Puckapunyal. Affectionately known as "The Rock", this purpose built building housed modern training kitchens, training bar, dining room and classrooms. It was the first time that the AACC had a home where all catering training was conducted in the one central location.

=== 1980s ===
The 1980s were a period of growth and consolidation for the AACC. During this period members of the Corps enjoyed a great deal of success in Salon Culinaires within the civilian catering industry. The reputation of the Army Cook and indeed the Service Cook was growing. In 1987 full civilian recognition was granted to AACC personnel who had completed prescribed courses and had served specified time in the trade. The status of the Army cook had reached a new level, a far cry from the "Ration Assassin" reputation of World War I and World War II cooks. During this period more appointments were made available to AACC Officers in Mess Management. The AACC strength of the AACC peaked at nearly 1,700 personnel.

In the mid-1980s the AACC were issued the new Kitchen Field Mobile (KFM), a European designed field kitchen mounted on a trailer. The concept was good, however, initially it was only supplied with a diesel burners, which proved to be dirty to work with, and a maintenance nightmare. This equipment received greater acceptance when gas burners replaced the diesel. These units have now reached their economical life and replacement is now being sought. Containerization is the preferred option. These kitchens will be equipped with modern catering equipment similar to that used back in barracks and will be air-conditioned. What a far cry from the open trench fires and Soya Stoves (coppers) used by our forefathers and other members of the Corps during World War II.

At the Corps birthday in 1986 a statue of the new Corps Centre piece was unveiled. The basis of the statue was derived from a charcoal drawing done at Finschhafen in 1944 by War Artist Captain Roy Hodgkinson. The drawing was of a cook standing in a field kitchen calling the troops to "Come 'N Get it" their evening meal. This soldier who was affectionately nicknamed "Nugget" and he now adorns the mantle pieces and walls of the homes of past and present members of the Corps. Nugget as a large bronze statue forms the centre piece of the AACC Memorial situated in the Logistic Corps Memorial Park in South Bandiana which was dedicated in 1999.

=== 1990s - Peace Keeping Roles ===
Early in the 1990s new words entered our vocabulary, Commercial Support Program (CSP). The plan was to cut the logistic tail by replacing as many military logistic positions as possible with civilians. The AACC was one of the Corps to experience 'commercialization'. It is all history now, the AACC like other logistic Corps suffered severe reductions in numbers, and their numbers being reduce from 1,700 to 650. This significant reduction in the strength of the Corps caused a lot of posting turbulence and created uncertainty as to whether the AACC was sustainable as a Corps. The morale of the Corps reached it lowest ebb in 1998 when it was decided that all officers in the Corps would be transferred to the Royal Army Ordnance Corps. Fortunately this order was rescinded after some strong lobbying by some officers of the corps.

In 1996 the Army Logistic Training Centre (ALTC) was formed, the Army School of Catering at Puckpunyal became part of this unit and was renamed Catering Wing ALTC. The Directorate of Catering remained in Puckapunyal until December 1997 and then it along with all other Directorates in the Australian Army was disbanded. In December 1998 the Catering Wing ALTC closed. Under the Defence Reform Program (DRP) all catering training was transferred to the newly formed Australian Defence Force School of Catering (ADFSC), which is located at HMAS Cerberus at Western Port, Victoria. All catering practical training was out-sourced is now conducted at the Chisholm TAFE on the Mornington Peninsula. Field catering training returned to ALTC within Latchford Barracks, Bonegilla, Victoria in 2004 at the Field Catering Cell (FTC) of the ADFSC.

During the 1990s' AACC personnel served with units in United Nations operations in Namibia, Iran/Iraq, Cambodia, Somalia, Rwanda and are still serving in East Timor and Bougainville. The Australian Army's deployment to East Timor has been the turning point for the Australian Army Catering Corps. Members of the AACC have excelled in performing not only their core role of sustaining soldiers of the Australian Army but they also ably assisted their units fulfil a range of other functions. The awarding of numerous commendations has recognized the efforts of individual AACC members and unit catering platoons.

=== 2000s - Iraq and Afghanistan ===
Because AACC members are dispersed throughout all units in the Australian Army there has been no opportunity until now to recognize the Corps for the role it has played with Army. The granting of the Governor-General's Banner is a significant opportunity to demonstrate tangible support for the AACC and to reinforce the Army's decision to retain it as a Corps. This was in recognition of the AACC's 60th Anniversary in 2003. The Banner will stand as an appropriate collective tribute to AACC members, both past and present, and will provide a focus for the Corps into the future.

In line with the Australian Army's deployments to Iraq and Afghanistan. Initially this was on an extremely limited scale, in support of Special Forces soldiers. There was a large reliance on Coalition partners for the feeding of Australian soldiers in these conflict zones. In 2009, the soldiers at the Tarin Kowt base were being fed by Royal Netherlands Army cooks, but they were unhappy with the meals being served, requiring 10 cooks to be rapidly deployed to Afghanistan to remedy the situation.

=== 2010s ===
In 2011, Australian Army cook, Lance Corporal Andrew Jones was killed after being shot 4 times by a rogue Afghan National Army soldier, Shafied Ullah. This occurred just outside his accommodation at Combat Outpost Mashal, near Tarin Kowt. Ullah fled after the incident, while being shot at by other ANA soldiers. He was subsequently killed at his home village during an operation involving US Special Forces and Afghan troops.

Civilian contractors assumed control of many mess facilities across major bases all around Australia during this decade. This saw a major shift of the roles undertaken by Australian Army cooks. Now deployed with soldiers on field deployments. The Australian Regular Army members of the Corps were removed from other Army units and consolidated into Catering Companies. Many Army Reservist cooks were combined into Combat Service Support Battalions.

=== 2020s - Domestic Operations and Natural Disasters ===
At the end of 2019 and the start of 2020 saw a large deployment of the Australian Army in support of bush firefighting efforts across New South Wales, Queensland and Victoria. Feeding not only soldiers but the firefighters and other emergency service personnel. This was the start of several years of major involvements in Domestic Operations in regards to responses to natural disasters. This including smaller scale efforts for flooding around the Mid North Coast of New South Wales in 2021, to major efforts for the turmultous 2022 floods across Queensland and New South Wales. Especially around the Northern Rivers region where over 4,000 soldiers had been deployed and multiple field kitchens had been set up in Lismore, Byron Bay, Casino and Evans Head.

The COVID-19 Pandemic saw a large deployment of Australian Defence Force personnel in support of the Australian Government efforts. The Catering Corps cooks helped in many roles, both in the kitchen and beyond.

Deployments have also increased across the Pacific Islands as the Australian Army has increased their presence in the region. Both in response to natural disasters, such as cyclones in Vanuatu but also in support of engineering efforts in Tonga and Papua New Guinea.

== See also ==
- Combat Ration One Man
- Field ration
- Field Ration Eating Device

Preceded by Australian Army Public Relations Service	Australian Army Order of Precedence	Succeeded by Royal Australian Army Pay Corps
