= Alfred Le Messurier =

Australian shipping agent

Alfred Le Messurier (24 July 1856 – 16 June 1927) was a shipping agent in Port Adelaide, South Australia. The family name was often styled LeMessurier.

== History ==
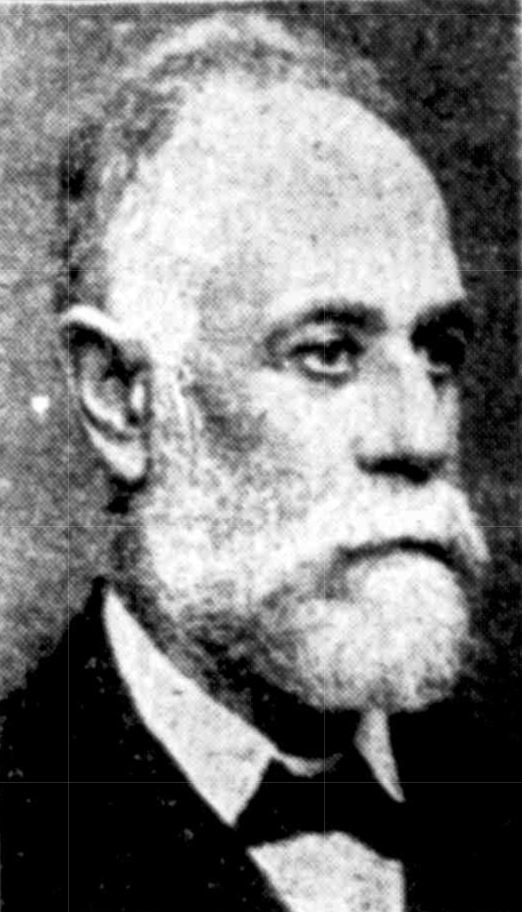
Alfred Le Messurier

Le Messurier was born in Queenstown, South Australia, the eldest son of (sea) Captain Peter Le Messurier (9 December 1815 – 3 March 1876). (Note: Captain Peter Le Messurier first arrived in South Australia in September 1848 in command of Rebecca Jane, 215 tons, from Mauritius, and left Port Adelaide for Swansea in November 1848 with 243 tons of copper ore. He made one more voyage in that ship, then arrived with Mrs Le Messurier as passengers in the barque Fop Smit from London. with his wife on 2 August 1853. He had a partnership with Theophilus Robin 1859–1872 in the timber trade.) He was educated at William Wood Leslie's school at Queenstown, then Rev. Frank Garrett's school at Port Adelaide (became Alfred Martin's grammar school, later Port Adelaide Public School), finally St Peter's College.

Captain Peter Le Messurier was in business as Port Adelaide agent for the various small shipping companies that traded around the South Australian coast, mostly conducted by ketches. In 1872 young Alfred began working for his father, and on whose death in 1876 he took charge of the business, just as sail was giving way to steam. His business interests were centred on Port Adelaide, and the smaller class of steamships. He became secretary of the Coast Company, which had the steamship Ceres. That company was merged in the Yorke's Peninsula Company, which ran Warooka and James Currie (later named Yulta). Next the West Coast Shipping Company, whose first ship was the Australian, whose career ended on 9 May 1912 as a wreck on Wardang Island, and Wookata. That company amalgamated with the Gulf Steamship Company as Coast Steamships Limited.

His brother Edward Collas Le Messurier (1859 – 16 September 1890) joined in 1873 to form A. & E. Le Messurier, and the business prospered. When Le Messurier took over the business from his father, the office staff numbered three; at the time of his death there were forty.

As a young man, Le Messurier was a keen athlete, notably as a runner over short distances. He played football for Port Adelaide, and was a valued member of the club, as were several of his brothers (see below). All three were competitive oarsmen.

He was a member of various business organisations: the Importers and Agents' Association of South Australia, of which a founder, and for several years, president; also the Chamber of Commerce, of which he was a council member for several years. He was also a member of Semaphore Convalescent Homes.

He died at his residence, Mill street, North Adelaide, at the age of 71 years, after 18 months of illness.

== Family ==
In 1880 he married Jane Sinclair Neill (1856–1908), a daughter of John Neill of Semaphore and Port Adelaide. Their children include:

- Ernest Warwick Le Messurier (1881–1884)
- Daisy Maud/e Le Messurier (1884–1970) married Arthur James Gordon Seddon ( –1935) in 1910, of Medindie

- Gordon David Le Messurier Seddon DFC ( –1986)

- (Alfred) Roy Le Messurier (19 February 1886 – 1946) joined his father's business at age 16, and specialized in the timber trade, founding Gunnersen Le Messurier in 1915. He married Margaret Galway Saunders (1885–1970) in 1912. She sued him for support in 1928. Margaret was a daughter of William Henry Saunders (c. 1852 – 26 June 1928), town clerk of Port Adelaide and brother of A. T. Saunders.
- (Janie) Dorothy Le Messurier (1888 – ) married P. Britten Wald, of Malvern, Victoria.
- Dr Frederick Neill Le Messurier DSO (12 January 1891 – 20 May 1966), He served in WWI as major in the 1st Australian Stationary Hospital. He married Frieda Gwendoline James on 9 November 1920.

He married again in November 1910 to Lillian Chewings, nurse of his first wife; they had one son:

- David Hugh Le Messurier (29 March 1912 – 9 November 1976) married Patricia O'Dea ( – ) in 1936. Rev K. J. F. Bickersteth officiated. He is remembered as a medical researcher.

== Other children of Captain Peter Le Messurier ==
Edward Collas Le Messurier (1859 – 16 September 1890) was a valued member of Port Adelaide Football Club. He was Secretary or CEO of the club for the years 1883–1885 and 1887. A. T. Saunders mis-reported that he died in Europe while attempting a health cure. He never married.

Ernest Le Messurier (8 May 1861 – 8 September 1937) was a brother and a playing member of PAFC and club captain in 1883, but a shoulder injury put an end to his playing career, and was elected secretary in 1885. He married Jessie Rainforth Neill (1867–1942) in 1889. Jessie was another daughter of John Neill. (Note: John Neill (21 September 1827 – 4 January 1890) was born in Kilmarnock, Scotland, and arrived in South Australia with his parents in September 1839. He was employed by the South Australian Company as surveyor and accountant, later accountant for Captain Henry Simpson, Adelaide Steam Tug Co. and Adelaide Steamship Co. and lived at Semaphore.) Their children include:

- Ernest John Le Messurier (1897–1977) married Rosina Elsa Simon in 1926.
- Kathleen Le Messurier (12 July 1898 – 1 January 1981), tennis player

Mary Matilda Le Messurier (1863 – 29 June 1945) married John Henry Stephen Kneebone (22 May 1856 – 18 December 1933) on 22 May 1889. Their children include:

- Dr John Le Messurier Kneebone (26 March 1890 – 1976)
- Christopher Stephen Kneebone M.M. (9 August 1895 – 1969), sportsman and mining engineer
