= Samuel Fiddian =

(1842 - 1904) school principal

Samuel Fiddian M.A. (1842 – 5 January 1904) was a schoolteacher, remembered as the first principal of Prince Alfred College in Adelaide, South Australia. He then founded a Grammar School in Creswick, Victoria, of which he was principal and proprietor from 1872 to 1903.

== History ==
Fiddian was born in Castle Donington, a son of English Wesleyan Methodist Rev. Samuel Fiddian (1804–1880) and his wife Grace Burall Fiddian née Paull (1811–1879) and was educated at Woodhouse Grove, the school for sons of the Methodist clergy at Huddersfield. He spent 1859–1862 in Tasmania, where he taught at Horton College, before acquiring his MA at Cambridge University, where he was wrangler of St. John's College. He was for a short time mathematics master at Wesley College, Sheffield, then was brought out to South Australia in 1869 to take up an appointment as foundation headmaster of Prince Alfred College, which then operated from a schoolroom behind the Pirie Street Methodist Church, the Kent Town campus not yet ready for occupation. He arrived in Melbourne aboard Essex early in January 1869. The Aldinga, taking Fiddian to Adelaide, had not yet arrived when classes started but he was able to take up his duties shortly after he landed. While in Adelaide he was appointed to the board of governors of the South Australian Institute.

He resigned in December 1870 and left Adelaide early in January 1871. For a year he taught mathematics at Geelong College before founding Creswick Grammar School, of which he was proprietor and headmaster from 1872 to 1903. He may have been assisted by his sister Mary Paull Fiddian (1836–1908).

== Recognition ==
His service to the community is recognised by an obelisk in Cambridge Street, Creswick, Victoria.

Fiddian Range in the Northern Territory may have been named for him.

== Family ==
Samuel Fiddian married (Charlotte) Sophia Robin (1846–18 August 1924), eldest daughter of James Robin on 9 January 1872. They lived in Creswick, Victoria. Their children included:

- Rev. James Rowland Fiddian (13 July 1873 – 20 February 1943) MSc was minister of St. Andrews Presbyterian Church, Unley, South Australia 1909–1917 before returning to Victoria, and was Moderator of the Presbyterian Church of Victoria from 1938 to 1940.
- Samuel Fiddian, jr. (c. 1877 – 13 September 1934), married his cousin, Margaret N. Robin, eldest daughter of Henry Nicholas Robin, on 21 March 1906. He was a teacher in Geelong, became part-owner of James Robin & Co. in 1909
- William de Jersey Fiddian (1878–1964) with the Bank of New South Wales at Sydney
- Charlotte Marguerite 'Rita' Fiddian (1885–1896) drowned with her cousin Maurice Robin at Ocean Grove, Victoria on 28 December 1896.

Samuel Fiddian died in Liverpool, England, as he was about to return to Australia.
