= Alicia Hempleman-Adams =

British polar traveller

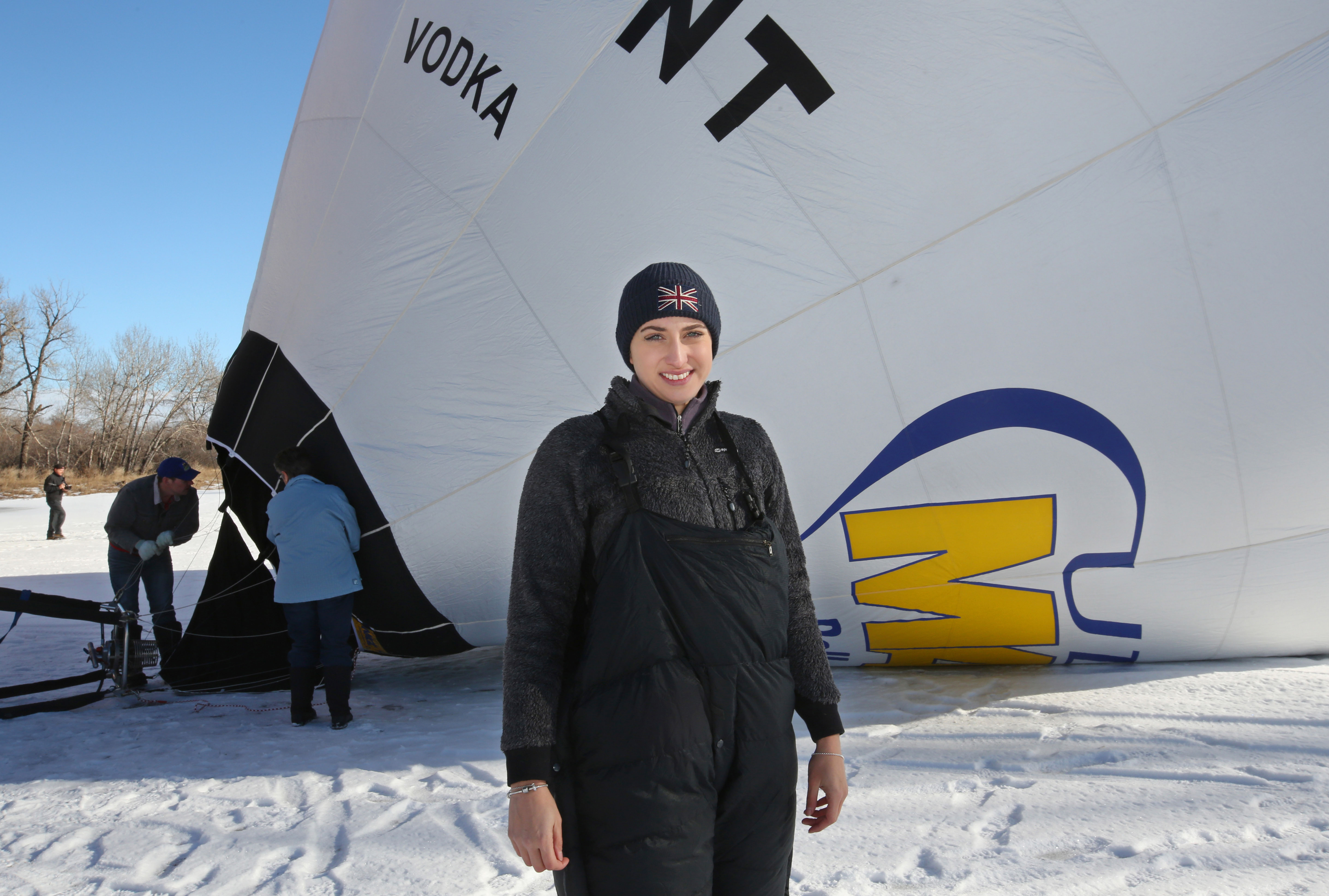
Hempleman-Adams in 2020

Alicia Nicole Hempleman-Adams MBE (born 8 November 1989) holds the record for the youngest person to have reached the North Pole when she was flown there to meet her father at the age of eight. On 13 April 2005 she became the youngest person to traverse Baffin Island, aged 15.

Hempleman-Adams took 10 days to walk and ski 200 miles across Baffin Island in north-east Canada. Hempleman-Adams and her three companions had to battle a wind chill factor of minus 30C, thin ice and open water along the trek.

In February 2020 Hempleman-Adams set the World Female Altitude Record in an AX4 Class hot air balloon, at 4628m, and the British Female Duration Record at 1h 46min in the same flight.

She attended Stonar School in Atworth, Wiltshire, and studied fashion at the University of Creative Arts (University of London) in Epsom. She works in logistics in the fashion industry.

== Family ==
Hempleman-Adams is the daughter of British explorer David Hempleman-Adams.
