= Roy Le Messurier =

Australian rules footballer and businessman

Alfred Roy Le Messurier
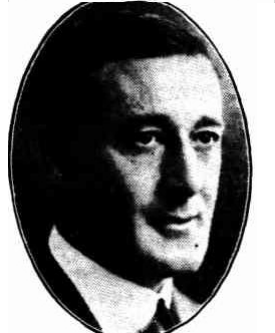

Personal information
- Born: 19 February 1886; Semaphore, South Australia
- Died: 5 October 1946 (aged 60); Fitzroy, South Australia

Playing career
Years	Club	Games (Goals)
1907	Port Adelaide	37
1908-1909; 1911-1913	North Adelaide	46 (4)

Representative team honours
Years	Team	Games (Goals)
1908	South Australia	3

Career highlights
- North Adelaide vice captain (1911, 1913)

Alfred Roy Le Messurier (19 February 1886 – 5 October 1946), generally known as Roy or A. Roy Le Messurier, was an Australian rules footballer and businessman in the exotic timber trade. The family name was often styled LeMessurier.

The eldest surviving son of Alfred Le Messurier, and Jane Sinclair Le Messurier, née Neill, Alfred Roy Le Messurier was born at Semaphore, South Australia on 19 February 1886.

He was educated at Semaphore Collegiate School and at St Peter's College.

== Employment ==
At age 16, Roy entered his father's shipping agency, A. & E. Le Messurier, where he specialized in importing timber from Tasmania for local furniture-makers, and developed it into a significant enterprise. He became chairman of directors and also managing director of Gunnersen, Le Messurier Ltd. His directorships included S.A. Gas Company, Quarry Industries Ltd, and Cowell Brothers & Co. Ltd.

He was a member of the Royal Adelaide and Mount Lofty Golf Clubs.

== Football ==
He played for Port Adelaide before the family moved to North Adelaide in 1908, and he qualified for the North Adelaide team under the electorate system. He played at North Adelaide from 1908–09 and 1910–13, playing 46 games and kicking 4 goals.

He played for South Australia at the 1908 Jubilee Australasian Football Carnival held in Melbourne.

His younger brother, Frederick Neill Le Messurier (1891-1966), also played for North Adelaide from 1908–10 and 1913–14 (playing with the Adelaide University Football Club from 1911–12).

He later re-joined Port Adelaide as a committeeman.

== Family ==
Le Messurier married Margaret Galway Saunders (1885–1970), at Semaphore, on 17 April 1912. Margaret was a daughter of William Henry Saunders (c. 1852 – 26 June 1928), town clerk of Port Adelaide and brother of A. T. Saunders.

They had three sons, and were living at 14 Martin Avenue, Fitzroy, in 1928 when his wife sought a review of the allowance he had settled on her and their children. Le Messurier and his wife toured Europe and America in 1929.

Their sons: (Alfred) Peter Le Messurier (born 1914), (Frederick) Lindsay Le Messurier (born 1915), and Richard Ward "Dick" Le Messurier (born 1918) were, for much of the 20th-century, South Australia's major importer and exporter of timber. They had a sizeable stake in Softwood Holdings and Timber Holdings for which, in 1987, they accepted a cash offer from CSR Limited.

== Death ==
Le Messurier died on 5 October 1946 at their home in Martin Avenue, Fitzroy, South Australia.

== See also ==
- 1908 Melbourne Carnival
