= Creswick Grammar School =

Australian High School

- Creswick, Victoria, Australia

Information
- Type: Independent high school
- Established: 1872; 154 years ago
- Founder: Samuel Fiddian
- Oversight: Department of Education (Victoria)
- Gender: Boys
- Age range: 13–18
- Student to teacher ratio: 8:1
- Website: creswick.net

The Creswick Grammar School is an independent high school, located in Creswick, Victoria, Australia, founded in 1872.

== History ==
Creswick Grammar School was founded by Samuel Fiddian in 1872 who served as the school's first headmaster. The school flourished under his leadership, who was acknowledged by many to be a great teacher and scholar. Later, the school became co-educational in 1873 and attracted students from all over Victoria.

== Notable headmasters ==
Notable headmasters of the school include:

- Samuel Fiddian
- James Robin

== Notable alumni ==
Notable alumni of the school include:

- Frederick Brawn
- John Percy Camm
- Frederick Hagelthorn
- John Albert Leach
- Charles McGrath, politician
- Thomas Parkin
- Alexander Peacock
- David Waters Sutherland
- Arthur Trethowan
