= A. T. Saunders =

Amateur historian (1854–1940)

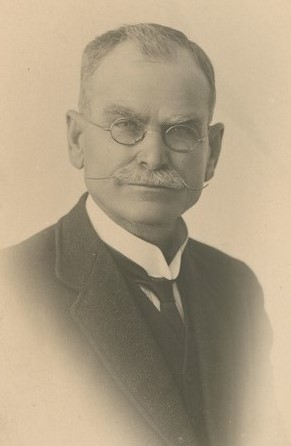

Alfred Thomas Saunders (4 September 1854 – 3 November 1940) was an accountant and amateur historian of the early days of South Australia. Using his personal collection of newspaper clippings, and only his memory of its contents to find relevant articles, he came to be regarded as South Australia's unofficial historian, with a particular interest in the sea and River Murray. On many occasions he challenged statements by public figures, thereby raising public interest in local history. He famously disputed an assertion by the distinguished author Joseph Conrad, resulting in a cordial correspondence.

== History ==
Saunders's grandparents, William and Ann Galway left the north of Ireland on the Adam Lodge in 1837 and arrived in Sydney on 13 July 1837. Ten years later they came to Port Adelaide in the Juno, the first steamship to enter Port Adelaide from another colony under its own steam. Both his mother and her sister married ship's captains. His father, Captain Thomas Alfred Saunders (married Margaret Galway 23 June 1849) arrived in South Australia from Hobart in 1849, and in 1852 was appointed first harbormaster at Port Elliot, then a busy harbour, and while there, helped survey the treacherous Murray Mouth.

Saunders was born at Queenstown in the house his grandfather William Galway built in 1859, then the only two-storey house in the area, later owned by Frank Coleman.

In 1867, after only two years' schooling, Saunders began work as an office boy. From late 1875 to 1876 he worked as a clerk for Coombe Brothers, storekeepers in the fledgling town of Port Pirie, so gained valuable first-hand knowledge of its early days. From 1895 to 1905 he was employed by the sharebroker H. L. Conran to keep his records.

In November 1886 he contributed his first article to a South Australian newspaper, his impressions of the effect the newly laid railway to Mount Gambler was having upon Beachport. He continued to write, and as the years went by the pursuit of South Australian history became a very serious hobby.

His greatest asset in this endeavour was his collection of clippings from every South Australian newspaper from 1837 to 1909, arranged chronologically, and relying on his memory to locate the required article. He also had records of the arrival of every ship which had visited South Australia. Nearly every day he answered an enquiry relating to South Australian history, and frequently contacted authors and newspapers, not only in every Australian State, but also in England and America, with corrections on matters of fact.

=== Bully Hayes ===
Around 1911 Saunders took to visiting his bedridden aunt, who regaled him with stories of her time in the Spice Islands, where she had met the famed naturalist Alfred Russel Wallace and the notorious Bully Hayes. The more he checked her dates and facts, the more he trusted her memory and decided to commit the Hayes story to print. Having begun to write a history of Hayes, he found it essential to visit Singapore, Shanghai, and Hong Kong. Any search undertaken by him was not abandoned until all possible avenues of information had been exhausted. Clerks in the British Admiralty were often called upon to delve into the dusty past, to complete Saunders's record of some old time sailing ship.

=== Joseph Conrad ===
He once wrote to Joseph Conrad, pointing out an error that the author had made, and after Conrad replied, acknowledging the mistake, a correspondence sprang up between them. Conrad had visited South Australia as mate of the ship Torrens in 1893, and Saunders wrote again to Conrad to ascertain if the Galsworthy in her passenger list was the author John Galsworthy. A later visit to South Australia in the Otago was recalled in another letter by Conrad to Saunders:

'14 June 1917, Capel House, Orlestone, near Ashford, Kent.
'Dear Mr. Saunders — You are a terror for tracking people out. It strikes me if I had done some thing involving penal servitude I would not like to have had you after me. However, I have done nothing of the sort, and am not likely to now — too old, and I can enjoy without misgivings the evidences of your skill, tenacity, and acuteness. Many thanks for your letter with the enclosures, giving the history of those lively ladies, the daughters of the late lamented Bully Hayes. Mostly all the inferences and surmises in your letter are correct. I did go to Minlacowie. The farmers around were very nice to me and I gave their wives – on a never-to-be-for gotten day – a tea party on board the dear old Otago, then lying alongside the jetty there. The Smile of Fortune story does belong to the Otago cycle, if I may call it so. The Secret Sharer in the same volume also does in a way, as far as the Gulf of Siam selling goes. The swimmer himself was suggested to me by a young fellow, who was second mate in the sixties of the Cutty Sark, and had the misfortune to kill a man on her, but his skipper had the decency to let him swim ashore to the Java coast, as the ship was passing through Anjer Straits. The story was well remembered in the merchant service, even in my time. To a man of letters and a distinguished publicist so experienced as your self I need not point out that I had to make material from my own life's incidents, arranged, combined, coloured, for artistic purposes. I don't think there is anything reprehensible in that. After all, I am a writer of fiction, and it is not what actually happens, but the manner of presenting it that settles the literary, and even the moral value, of my work. My little volume of autobiography, of course, is absolutely genuine. The rest is a more or less close approximation to facts and suggestions. What I claim as true are my mental and emotional reactions to life, to men, and their affairs, and their passions, as I have seen them. I have, in that sense, kept always true to myself. I have not the time to write more at present, but pray believe that I appreciate very highly the kind way you are keeping me in mind. In a few days I will dispatch to you a copy of the new edition of Lord Jim, which is about to be published by Dent. Believe me, yours sincerely, JOSEPH CONRAD.'

=== Matilda Wallace ===
In 1922 Saunders discovered an anonymous pamphlet in the Public Library titled Twelve Years' Life in Australia from 1859-1871. After making a public plea in The Register, he was able to identify, with the help of John Lewis, who met her in 1867, the author as Matilda Wallace, née Hill. He expressed considerable admiration for 'what a plucky young and small "Pommy" woman did in South Australia and New South Wales in the early days'. He recognised the pamphlet as a valuable account of her experiences following her arrival here from Somerset. Saunders commented 'her history is well worth reading, and the phonetic spelling of places is interesting'.

When Matilda arrived in a new settlement, she would not have been greeted by a sign on its outskirts that revealed its name. She could only hear the way locals spoke its name and attempt to represent the name in English, and so it is not surprising that Saunders commented on her phonetic spelling of place names. The first place name in her memoir that Matilda spelled phonetically was`Curri Mantel' Valley. It would seem "ro" was misheard as "ri" and the "del" ending mistaken for "tel". This is probably not unexpected when Matilda was still a very new arrival to Australia and was used to a Somerset accent.

Following Saunders's investigations, Matilda's story was retold in the Adelaide Stock and Station Journal and repeated in at least one South-East newspaper.

=== German settlement in South Australia ===
Saunders questioned the attitude of those, such as Pastor Brauer, (Note: Further newspaper correspondence between Pastor Alfred Ernest Richard Brauer (died 1949) and Saunders serves only to confirm Saunders's jaundiced views) who opined that South Australia in general and George Fife Angas in particular, owed a debt of gratitude to the 500-odd Germans who left their country to settle in South Australia around 1838. Angas had lost heavily in financing the unplanned third voyage; that of the Catharina under Captain Schacht, Pastor Kavel's people from Posen. Kavel had been ungrudging in his gratitude to the English and Dutton in particular.

=== The libel case ===
On 12 January 1918, the South Australian Register published a letter from Saunders which accused Government members Crawford Vaughan (Premier), Reginald Pole Blundell and Clarence Goode of complicity in shady land deals, notably the purchase at inflated prices from accomplices, of land intended for First AIF soldier-settlers. As a result of his enquiries, assisted by whistleblowers, and energetic publicising of his findings and opinions, a Royal Commission was held which found two officials (Chief Secretary Alfred William Styles, and Government Valuator Edward Britten Jones) guilty of misdemeanours, but failed to impeach Vaughan, Blundell and Goode, who issued Saunders with a writ for libel. Prominent citizens such as the Hon. D. M. Charleston, writing as a member of the Stock Exchange Club, contributed to a defence fund, but the writ was withdrawn.

=== A. T. Saunders, Captain Cadell and the Randells ===
Saunders had a very jaundiced view of the personality and achievements of Francis Cadell, comparing him unfavourably with Charles Sturt and William Randell, accusing him of "childish vanity". He called his pioneering paddle-steamer Lady Augusta (or Lady Agusta as he delighted in referring to the spelling by which she was registered) a "two-funnelled monstrosity". "Cadell", said Saunders, "had plenty of political, financial, and Adelaide Government House pull . . . and Government money was poured into his pockets. His father, relatives, friends, and clique kept him well before the public and in the press. Lieutenant-Governor Young and Governor MacDonnell omitted from despatches that the Randells had the Mary Ann on the Murray months before Cadell had the Lady Augusta; yet Cadell failed, and whined that he had been ruined by competition . . . he did not stick to his Murray River business, but was running round seeking for notoriety and the limelight, and asking for concessions. Randell had not powerful moneyed friends, such as Cadell had; yet, undismayed by bad luck, Randell plugged on, stuck to the river, and succeeded. The Randells personally, and not by proxy, made a success of river navigation, and in so doing showed boldness, courage, and originality."

Saunders may have been alone in his campaign against the memory of Cadell. Some who knew the man, such as George Johnston, Thomas Goode and others such as John Lewis M.L.C. and W. J. Magarey had a much higher opinion of him. George Hart however concurs with Saunders, adding that Cadell was not troubled by fits of honesty.

Saunders somehow acquired the board minutes of Cadell's River Murray Steam Navigation Company, and donated it to the Public Library of South Australia to put on the public record the "brilliant genius (of) Capt. Francis Cadell".

In 1899 Saunders was elected to the Royal Geographical Society of South Australia.

== Critiques ==
Saunders had a good brain but a minimum of schooling, so found writing irksome, and he had no knowledge of record-keeping standards. This led to him developing his own systems, which required a minimum of writing and were highly effective, but incomprehensible to anyone else. He had a perfect memory for names, places and dates, but was incapable of memorising abstractions such as the conjugation of a simple French verb or the batting averages of a cricket player.

Saunders had a very jaundiced view of the Lutheran Church and the German people (at least those who came to South Australia and settled in places such as Hahndorf and Klemzig), finding them boorish and insular. Such sentiments found ready acceptance during the First World War.

== Bibliography ==
- Saunders, A. T. (1915) Bully Hayes : barrator, bigamist, buccaneer, blackbirder and pirate: An authentic life of William Henry Hayes of Ohio or New York City, born 1829, killed 1877 40 pp. published by Sunday Times, Perth, W.A. 1932.

=== Some selected newspaper articles ===
- Comments about shipping; 1923 critique of an article by W.G.R., where he mentions around 100 ships and captains.
- Comments on the usefulness or otherwise of shore-based lifeboats.
- A long article on Bully Hayes
- Criticism of Government purchase of overpriced swampland near Semaphore.
- Some early doctors
- History of The Advertiser
- Obituary for his old friend George Liversage Barrow.
- Medical progress, exemplified by the deaths of Dr. David Wark's family.
- Naming of the suburb Semaphore
- Buildings in old Port Adelaide
- Some early schools
- Early and curious burials

== Family ==
- His mother's sister Mrs. R. H. Allen (née Galway) (1829– ) who migrated to Sydney in 1837, first interested him in "Bully" Hayes.
- Thomas Allen, whom she married in 1850, was master and owner of the Swallow and Schah Jehan, and master of other ships.
- His cousin T. M. Allen (18 December 1859 – 1912) was master of the steamer Koombana, which was lost with all hands in March 1912.
- His father, Thomas Saunders (died 1856) was at one time master of the Margaret Brock and later harbormaster of Port Elliot.
- His brother William Henry Saunders (c. 1852 – 26 June 1928) was for many years town clerk of Port Adelaide.

- Margaret Galway Saunders (1885–1970) married Alfred Roy Le Messurier, footballer and timber merchant

On 13 September 1877 he married Helen Gordon Wald (c. 1855 – 7 December 1941), at one time a near neighbour in Queenstown. Among their children were:

- Helen Muriel Saunders (1878– ) married Percy Neville Wood in 1904, lived at North Adelaide
- Florence Margaret (or Margaret Florence) Sinclair Saunders (1880 – 12 August 1962)
- Thomas Allen Saunders (1881–1956) of North Adelaide
- Jessie Gordon Saunders (1885 – 15 July 1981) married Arthur Scholefield Mann in 1912
- Magnus Graham Saunders (1887–1956) of Leabrook
