= Josef Hempelmann =

German architect and politician

- Born: 26 September 1893; Lohne, Lower Saxony, Germany
- Died: 27 April 1967 (aged 73); Lohne, Lower Saxony, Germany
- Occupation: Politician
- Political party: Christian Democratic Union

Josef Hempelmann (26 September 1893 – 27 April 1967) was a German architect and politician from the German Christian Democratic Union. He was Mayor of Lohne between 1946 and 1950.
