= Frederick Le Messurier =

Australian military doctor (1891–1966)

- Born: 12 January 1891; Semaphore, South Australia
- Died: 20 May 1966 (aged 75); Calvary Hospital, North Adelaide, South Australia
- Relatives: Alfred Le Messurier (father)
- Military career
- Allegiance: Australia
- Branch: Australian Imperial Force; Citizen Military Forces
- Service years: 1914–1919; 1940–1946
- Rank: Colonel
- Commands: 105th Australian General Hospital; 12th Field Ambulance
- Conflicts: First World War; Gallipoli campaign; Western Front; Second World War
- Awards: Distinguished Service Order; Mentioned in Despatches (2)

Frederick Neill Le Messurier, DSO (12 January 1891 – 20 May 1966), commonly referred to as "Freddy", was a medical doctor in South Australia, specializing in paediatrics. He was decorated for his service in the First World War and commanded the Australian Army's 105th Australian General Hospital in the Second World War.

== Early life and education ==
Le Messurier was born in Semaphore, South Australia, a son of Alfred Le Messurier and Jane Sinclair Le Messurier, née Neill. He was a grandson of Captain Peter Le Messurier.

Le Messurier was educated at Semaphore, and at St Peter's College, where he not only shone at sports, but was an all-round student – an officer in the Cadets and debating team member, prefect and school captain. He excelled scholastically: Farrell scholar in 1905 and Young exhibitioner in 1908. He studied medicine at the University of Adelaide, graduating Bachelor of Medicine, Bachelor of Surgery with first-class honours in 1913 and Doctor of Medicine in 1920. He did his residency at the Adelaide Hospital, on North Terrace. He played football for the University of Adelaide ("The Blacks"), and for North Adelaide in 1908–1910 and 1913–1914.

== Military service and medical career ==
On 22 October 1914, at the outbreak of the First World War, Le Messurier applied for a commission in the Australian Army Medical Corps. His application was accepted, and he served with the Australian Imperial Force at Gallipoli and in Egypt before joining the 12th Field Ambulance on the Western Front in March 1917. He was promoted to major in November 1916, and mentioned in despatches on 7 April 1918, gazetted 28 May 1918. He was awarded the Distinguished Service Order for his actions on 8–10 August 1918 (perhaps at Amiens), when he evacuated wounded soldiers while under fire. The following month he was promoted to temporary lieutenant colonel and placed in command of the field ambulance.

Le Messurier returned to Adelaide, where his appointment was terminated on 17 April 1919. He was then appointed a resident medical officer at the Children's Hospital, Melbourne and began specializing in paediatrics. In 1922 he joined the staff of Mareeba Babies' Hospital, Adelaide, and in 1924 joined the staff of Adelaide Children's Hospital, where for many years he was a board member.

In 1940, following the outbreak of the Second World War, Le Messurier volunteered for service with the Australian Army, and was appointed to head the 105th Australian General Hospital in Adelaide, located in Col. Light Gardens. He helped establish the Repatriation General Hospital in the Adelaide suburb of Springbank.

Le Messurier died on 20 May 1966 in Calvary Hospital, North Adelaide, and his remains cremated.

== Family ==
Le Messurier married Frieda Gwendoline James on 9 November 1920. They had one son:

- John Frederick Le Messurier (22 October 1922 – 1978) married Joan Elizabeth Catton Grasby on 28 February 1948 and had a home on Cross Road, Myrtle Bank.
