= Tonsley, South Australia =

Tonsley
- Suburb
- Coordinates: 35°0′30″S 138°34′15″E
- Country: Australia
- State: South Australia
- City: Adelaide
- LGA: City of Marion
- Established: 2017

Government
  - State electorate: Elder
  - Federal division: Boothby

Population
  - Total: 743 (SAL 2021)
- Postcode: 5042
Suburbs around Tonsley
	Clovelly Park
Mitchell Park	Tonsley	St Marys
	Bedford Park

Tonsley is a southern suburb of Adelaide, the capital city of South Australia.

== History ==
The suburb of Tonsley was created on 27 January 2017 by dividing the suburb of Clovelly Park in half. The southern part of the suburb was separated from Clovelly Park and named Tonsley at that time.

Named after England's Tonsley Hall, it includes the former vehicle assembly plant, which was often called Tonsley Park. The Chrysler Australia car plant was opened in 1964. The factory was taken over by Mitsubishi Motors Australia in 1980 and closed in 2008.

The former vehicle factory is being developed as the Tonsley Innovation District with light industry, campuses of TAFE and Flinders University as well as residential development.

The suburb is served by Tonsley railway station on the Flinders railway line.
