= Clovelly Park, South Australia =

Clovelly Park
- Suburb
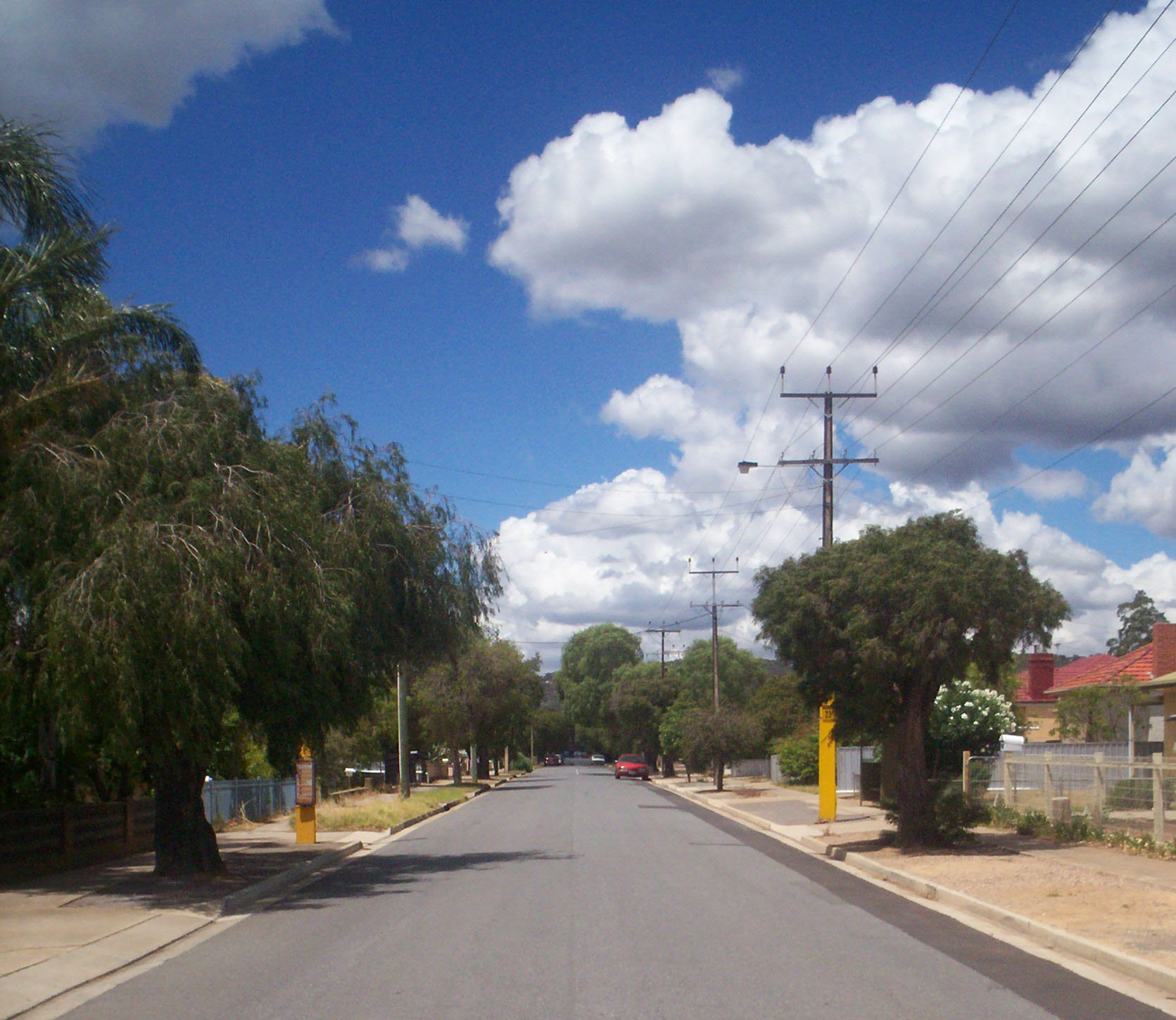
- English Avenue, looking east towards South Road

- Country: Australia
- State: South Australia
- City: Adelaide
- LGA: City of Marion
- Location: 10 km (6.2 mi) from Adelaide City Centre

Government
  - State electorate: Elder, Mitchell
  - Federal division: Boothby

Area
  - Total: 10.1 km^{2} (3.9 sq mi)

Population
  - Total: 3,126 (SAL 2021)
- Postcode: 5042, 5043
Suburbs around Clovelly Park
Ascot Park	Edwardstown	Melrose Park
Mitchell Park	Clovelly Park	St Marys
Mitchell Park	Tonsley	St Marys

Clovelly Park is an inner southern suburb of Adelaide in the local government area of the City of Marion. The suburb is bordered by Daws Road to the north, South Road to the east, Sturt Road to the south, and a combination of Percy Avenue and the Flinders railway line to the west. It is situated approximately 20 minutes from the Adelaide city centre, and about 2 minutes from Flinders University, Flinders Medical Centre and Westfield Marion.

== Etymology ==
Clovelly Park is named after the village in Devon, England of the same name.

== History ==
The original inhabitants of the area, the Kaurna, lived mainly along the Sturt River which passes several hundred metres to the south of the suburb's southern boundary.

In 1955, Chrysler Australia purchased 71 hectares (180 acres) of land in Clovelly Park and built a car assembly plant which was opened in 1964.

The Clovelly Park Post Office opened on 15 November 1950 and was renamed St Marys in 1967.

The southern part of Clovelly Park was often called Tonsley Park. Chrysler, and later on Mitsubishi, referred to their 'Tonsley Park' plant. This part of Clovelly Park (including the former Mitsubishi Motors Australia plant) was separated and renamed Tonsley on 27 January 2017.

== Schools and childcare ==
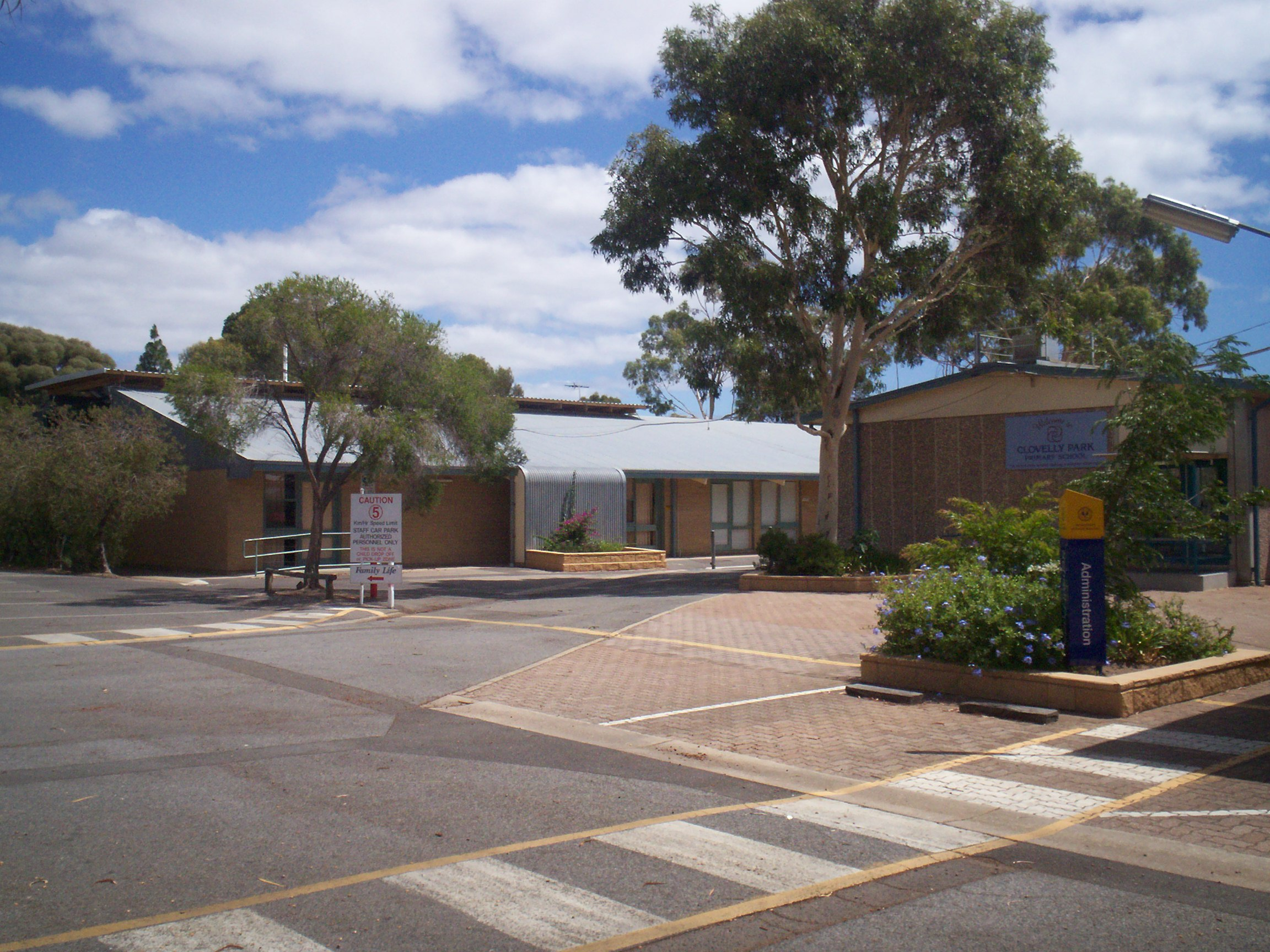
Clovelly Park Primary School, originally known as Mitchell Park Primary School. It was renamed in 1995 following the closure of Tonsley Park Primary School.

The area contains a government primary school – Clovelly Park Primary School – which caters to approximately 300 students and includes a New Arrivals Program (NAP) for young migrant students. The nearest government secondary school is Mitchell Park's Hamilton Secondary College (formerly Mitchell Park Technical College). St Bernadette's School in St. Marys is a lower-primary Catholic school, teaching from reception to grade 5, and is located on the other (eastern) side of South Road. Sacred Heart College Middle School in Mitchell Park provides Catholic schooling for boys in grades 6–9, while Westminster School is an independent Uniting Church school catering for approximately 1000 students from reception to year 12, and is located in the nearby suburb of Marion.

There is no kindergarten within the suburb, but Mitchell Park Kindergarten is close by, and the suburb houses an ABC Learning Centre which provides childcare.

A plan to convert an existing shopping complex on South Road into an independent primary school for the Exclusive Brethren was initially approved by the City of Marion's Development Assessment Panel, before being successfully challenged in the Supreme Court by a local business owner.

Clovelly Park Primary School houses the office of Family Life SA which delivers programs and provides resources on sexuality education to schools around the state.

Finally, Clovelly Park was the location of the former Marion High School, established 1955, which closed in 1996. The old high school grounds were converted into a housing estate, but the school hall remains as a community centre.

== Parks and community halls ==
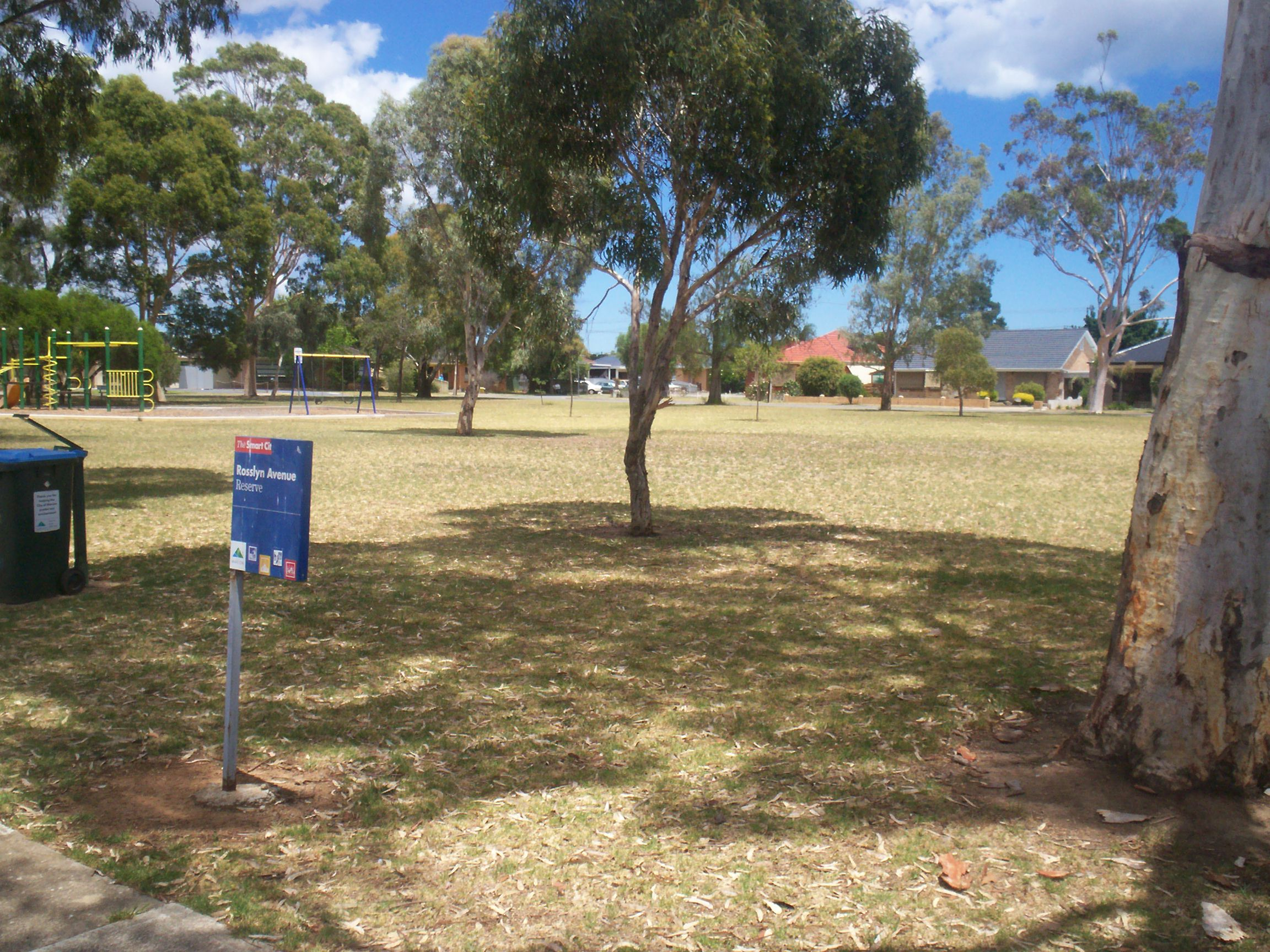
Rosslyn Avenue Reserve, the largest public open area within Clovelly Park

The largest park within the suburb is Rosslyn Avenue Reserve, which sits between Rosslyn Avenue and Beverley Street at the northern end of the suburb. Rosslyn Avenue Reserve has a playground, seating and a playing area.

The Clovelly Park Reserve lies between Scottish and Australian Avenues. It features a playground, a community hall, electric barbecues and tennis courts that can be hired by the general public.

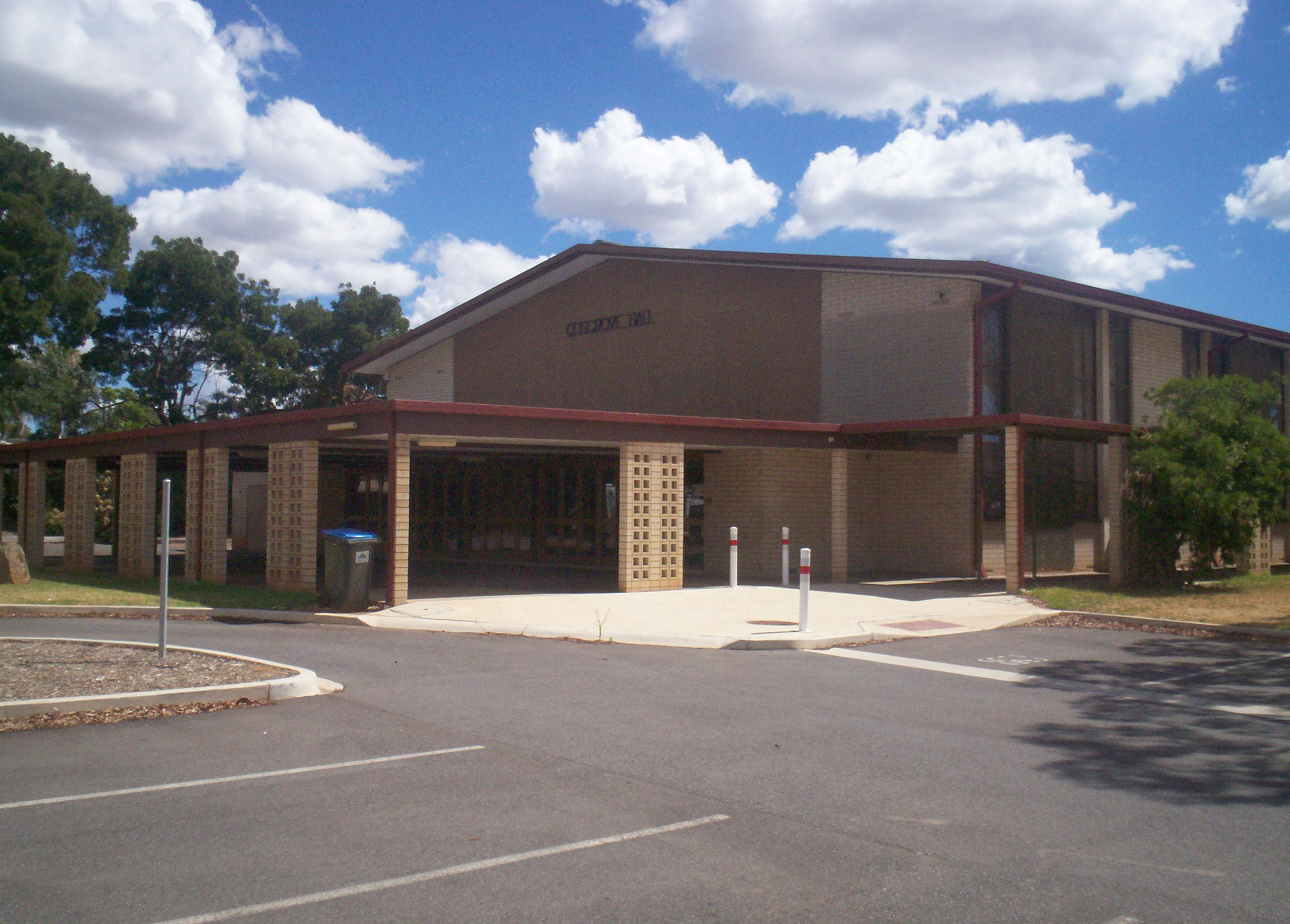
Cosgrove Hall is all that remains of Marion High School.

Slightly further south, on the site of the former Marion High School, sits Cosgrove Hall – the original school hall and gymnasium. The hall can be hired for a variety of purposes, and the site includes the Graham Watts Playground (completed in February 2006, and named after the long-serving local councillor), a basketball net and undercover seating. The hall can be found on the corner of York Street and Scott Avenue. Cosgrove Hall is also the unofficial home of Zero1 Pro Wrestling Australia who run professional wrestling events at the Hall.

Byron Avenue Reserve, which resides next to the old Clovelly Park Scout Hall on Byron Avenue, encompasses 0.49 hectares which are in the process of being revegetated with pre-European flora. The reserve contains 200-year-old river red gums, and used to include Viaduct Creek before the creek was built over as part of the Chrysler/Mitsubishi development.

Although not located in Clovelly Park, the adjacent Mitchell Park Reserve on Bradley Grove provides a full-sized playing oval, a community hall, tennis courts, barbecues, large open spaces and two playgrounds.

== Health and community services ==
Known as The Southern Clinic from 1959 to 1974, the Clovelly Park Community Health Centre provides health services for the area, with six medical doctors on staff. The clinic is open Monday to Saturday, and out-of-hours appointments can be organised for Sundays. Counseling and related services are available through the Inner Southern Community Health Service.

== Notable residents ==
- Rosemary Crowley, doctor at the Clovelly Park Community Health Centre from 1974 to 1982, Labor Senator for South Australia from 1983 to 2002.
- Shaun Micallef, comedian, ARIA award winner and host of Talkin' 'Bout Your Gen.

== Transport ==
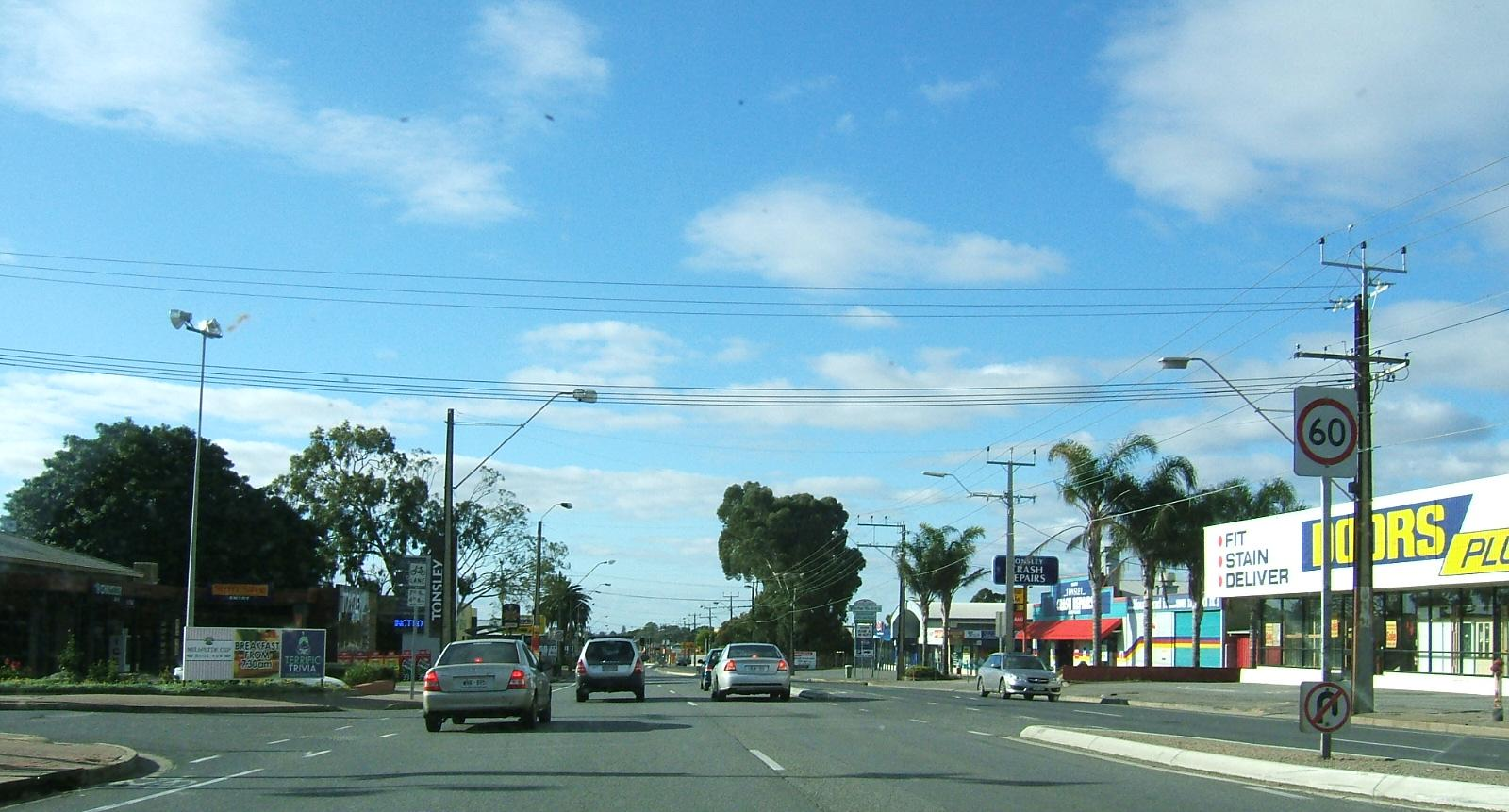
Street in Clovelly Park, looking west from South Road

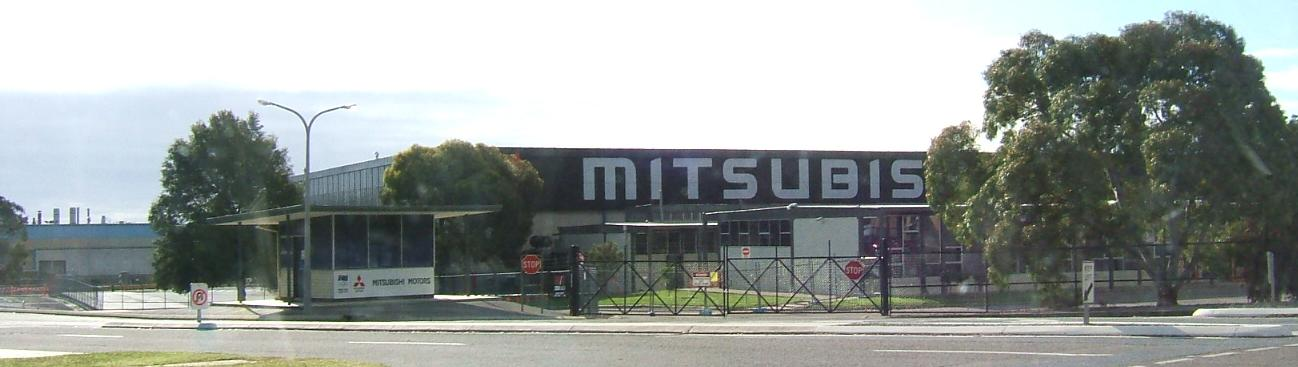
The disused Mitsubishi plant

The suburb lies adjacent to South Road to the east, and Marion Road lies a short distance to the west. South Road is the main north–south arterial road in Adelaide, and thus it provides rapid access to a large portion of the city. Limited east-west travel is facilitated through Daws Road/Oaklands Road to the north and Sturt Road to the south.

Clovelly Park is well serviced by public transport. Frequent buses run along South Road, 200B, 300, 719, G21, T721, T722, W90, G10, G20, 300H, 600S, 955, 976, 977 are some bus routes that run through the suburb. In addition, the northern residential portion of Clovelly Park is serviced by the Mitchell Park railway station on the Flinders railway line. The Seaford railway line, which provides more services than the Tonsley line, is close by and is accessible via the Ascot Park railway station to the north of the suburb.

== Politics ==
The suburb is part of the federal seat of Boothby held by Louise Miller-Frost and the state seats of Elder and Mitchell.
