= Clovelly Park railway station =

Railway station in Adelaide, South Australia

Coordinates: 35°00′29″S 138°34′02″E

Clovelly Park
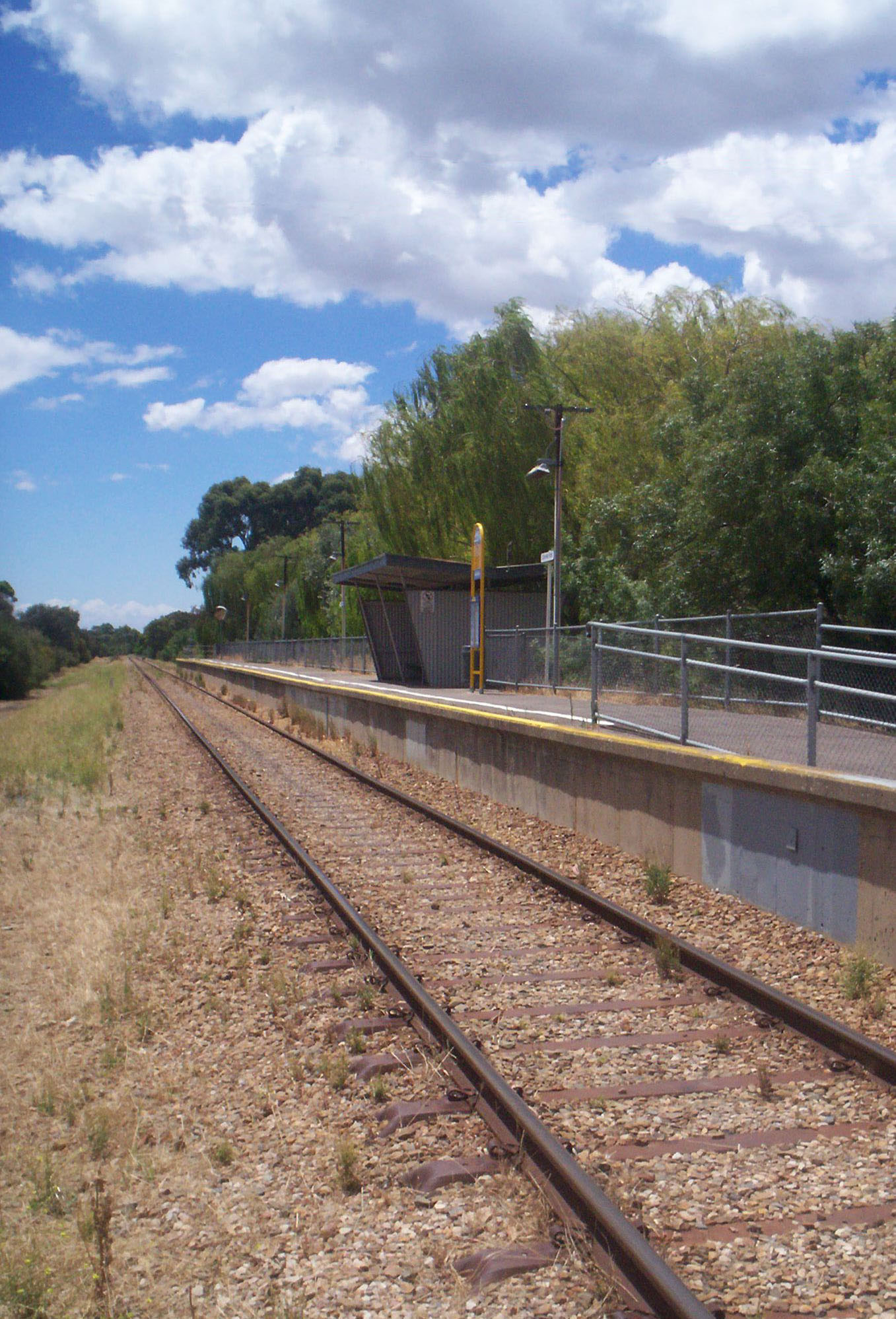

General information
- Location: Kirra Avenue, Mitchell Park
- Owner: Department of Planning, Transport & Infrastructure
- Operator: Adelaide Metro
- Line: Flinders
- Distance: 12.1 km from Adelaide
- Platforms: 1

Construction
- Parking: Yes

History
- Opened: 1 July 1966
- Closed: 18 November 2020
- Former names: Chrysler Park

Services
Preceding station	Adelaide Metro	Following station
Former services
Mitchell Park towards Adelaide	Tonsley line	Tonsley Terminus
Location

Clovelly Park railway station was a railway station located on the Flinders line in the south-western Adelaide suburb of Mitchell Park.

== History ==
Chrysler Park station, named after the adjoining car factory, opened on 1 July 1966 when the Tonsley line was branched from the Noarlunga Centre line at Ascot Park. The station was located immediately north of the level crossing at Alawoona Avenue. On 26 June 1987 it was renamed Clovelly Park after Chrysler Australia and its factory was acquired by Mitsubishi Motors Australia.

The station became the temporary terminus of the Tonsley line between 1 July 2019 and 20 November 2020, following the closure of the original Tonsley station at Sturt Road to facilitate the extension of the line to Flinders. As part of the extension project, Clovelly Park was replaced by a relocated Tonsley station built to the immediate south of the adjacent Alawoona Avenue level crossing; the new station being better equipped to serve the residential, light industrial and educational Tonsley Innovation District located on the site of the former car factory.

Clovelly Park station was permanently closed after the last service on 20 November 2020 and demolished. The railway line itself was also temporarily closed at that time, with the new Tonsley and Flinders stations opened on 29 December 2020.

== Services by platform ==
Platform	Destinations
1	Adelaide / Tonsley
