= Clarence Park railway station =

Railway station in Adelaide, South Australia

Clarence Park
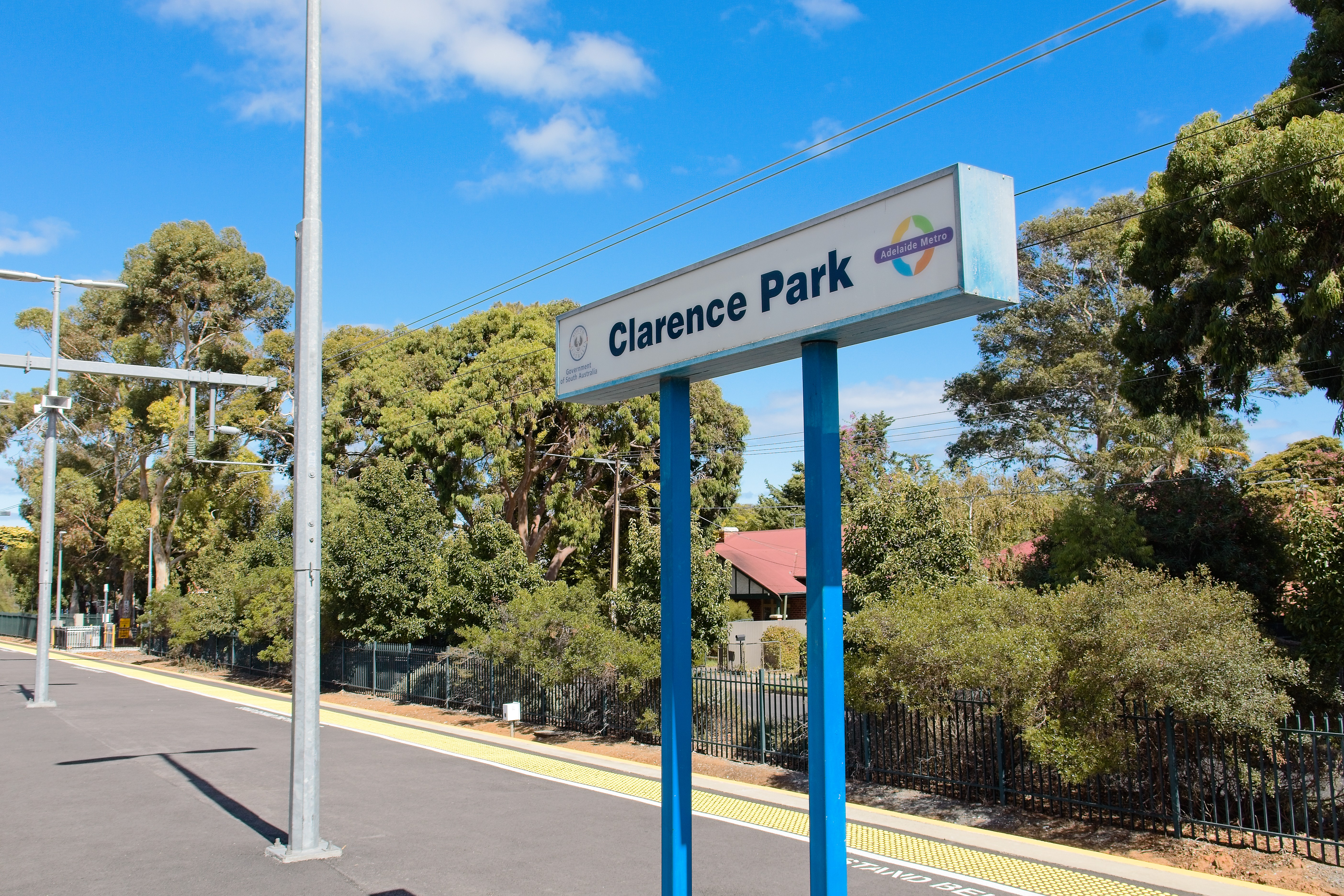
- View of Clarence Park station showing its name board, from March 2026.

General information
- Location: Parker Terrace, Clarence Park
- Coordinates: 34°57′41″S 138°34′50″E
- Owner: Department for Infrastructure & Transport
- Operator: Adelaide Metro
- Lines: Seaford, Flinders
- Distance: 6.3 km from Adelaide
- Platforms: 2
- Tracks: 2
- Bus routes: W90 to Marion Centre; W91 to St Marys

Construction
- Structure type: Ground
- Parking: No
- Cycle facilities: No

History
- Opened: 1913

Services
Preceding station	Adelaide Metro	Following station
Goodwood towards Adelaide	Flinders line	Emerson towards Flinders
Goodwood towards Adelaide	Seaford line	Emerson towards Seaford
Location

Clarence Park railway station is located on the Seaford and Flinders lines. Situated in the inner south-western Adelaide suburb of Clarence Park, it is 6.3 kilometres from Adelaide station.

== History ==
The station was opened in 1913 following a request from local Unley Council ratepayers.

The ticket office was closed in 1921, but reopened shortly after with Mrs. M. Murphy appointed agent for the sale of tickets. Significant improvements were undertaken in 1935 to add a new waiting room and ticket office.

== Services by platform ==
Platform	Destination/s
1	Seaford/Flinders
2	Adelaide
