= Woodlands Park railway station =

Railway station in Adelaide, South Australia

Woodlands Park
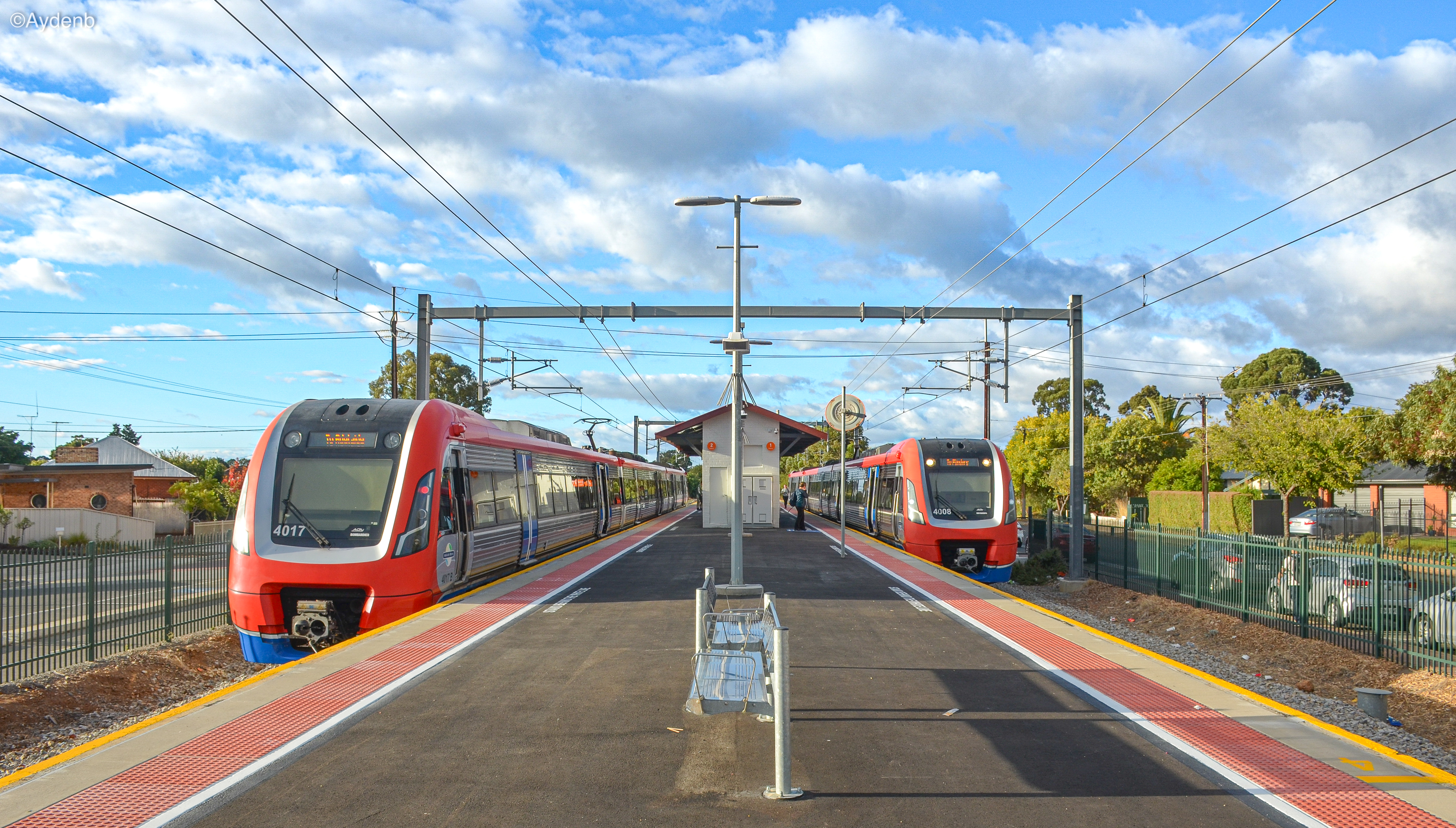
- South-west bound view from the platforms, with 2 Adelaide Metro 4000 class at the station, April 2024

General information
- Location: Railway Terrace, Edwardstown
- Coordinates: 34°58′59″S 138°34′02″E
- Owner: Department for Infrastructure & Transport
- Operator: Adelaide Metro
- Lines: Seaford, Flinders
- Distance: 9.1 km from Adelaide
- Platforms: 2
- Tracks: 2
- Bus routes: N7, 241, 241A, N4

Construction
- Structure type: Ground
- Parking: Yes
- Cycle facilities: Yes

Other information
- Station code: To Seaford & Flinders - 18587; To Adelaide - 16570

History
- Opened: 1925
- Rebuilt: 2024

Services
| Preceding station | Adelaide Metro | Following station |
|---|---|---|
| Edwardstown towards Adelaide | Flinders line | Mitchell Park towards Flinders |
| Edwardstown towards Adelaide | Seaford line | Ascot Park towards Seaford |
Location

Woodlands Park railway station is the junction station for the Seaford and Flinders lines. Situated in the inner south-western Adelaide suburb of Edwardstown, it is 9.1 kilometres from Adelaide station.

== History ==
Woodlands Park opened in 1925, and was named after the old suburb of Woodlands Park.

The stations was originally known as ‘Woodlands’ the name was from the nearby Woodlands House near the site of the present station. The ‘Woodlands’ was named after two storeyed house built by Alfred Weaver in 1869. After Alfred Weaver’s death, ‘Woodlands’ was bought by William Maxwell in 1891, he added a tower, gargoyle and battlement, which is like a castle-shaped building built and designed by William Maxwell. It was retained and used as Castle Motor Hotel in 1960 at South Road. The site is now occupied by Coles Supermarket in Castle Plaza shopping centre.

The station had step down platform on what is now the outside of ‘down’ main. The name was changed to Woodlands Park in 1934. The single track from north of Raglan Avenue level crossing to Oaklands had it first section of welded track which was six-length during the year 1936 - 38. This is the location of the present ‘down’ track.

A raised island platform with concrete lining was constructed in 1954 in preparation for duplication with the 1950 type ticket office and waiting shelter. These buildings were the same construction as for Marion, Warradale and Hove. Double line was commenced in 1955.

Due to the number of passengers increased since the line was duplicated due to residential on the west side and light industrials on the east. Number of passengers use this station to attend the place of employment during the weekdays.

The new manufacturing plant was constructed at Tonsley Park south of Edwardstown which require a branch line from the junction north of Ascot Park to the Chrysler Manufacturing industry. A branch line was laid during 1965 and was opened in 1966. Woodlands Park becomes a junction station for Marino line with the branch line to Tonsley Park. Some passenger trains worked to Tonsley during peak hours with one service during off-peak.

The station got a modern upgrade in early 2024. During this time, Edwardstown was used as the junction station for the Seaford and Flinders lines.

== Services by platform ==
| Platform | Destination/s |
|---|---|
| 1 | Seaford/Flinders |
| 2 | Adelaide |

=== Adelaide Metro Bus ===
Bus transfers: Stop Stop 17 (Adelaide Terrace)
| Route no. | Destination & route details |
| 241 | City via Beckman Street |
| 241 | Westfield Marion via Oaklands Interchange |
