= Edwardstown railway station =

Railway station in Adelaide, South Australia

Edwardstown
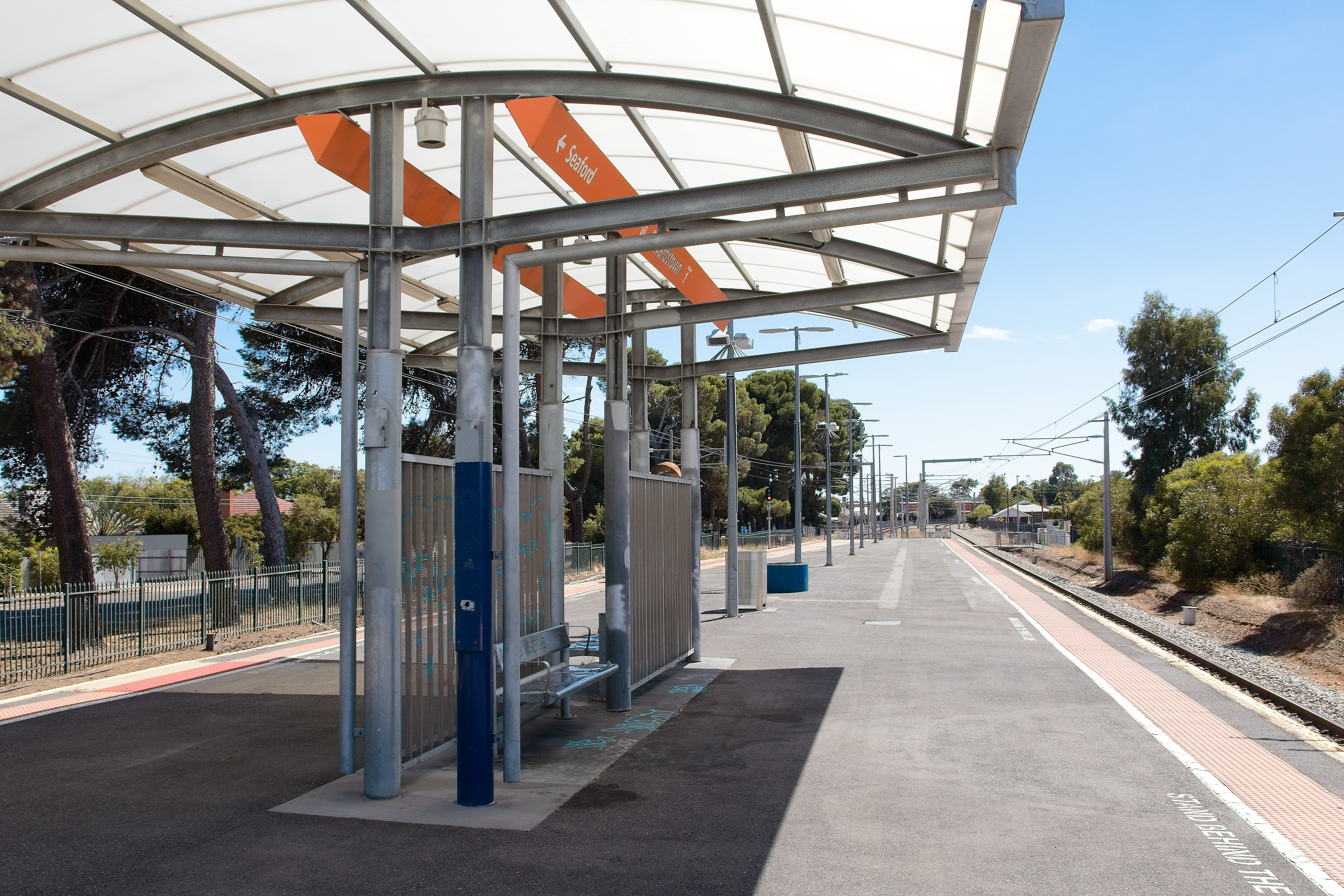
- Northbound view from Platform 2, March 2026

General information
- Location: Railway Terrace, Edwardstown
- Coordinates: 34°58′20″S 138°34′16″E
- Owner: Department for Infrastructure & Transport
- Operator: Adelaide Metro
- Lines: Seaford, Flinders
- Distance: 7.9 km from Adelaide
- Platforms: 2
- Tracks: 2
- Bus routes: 296 to St Marys; 297 to Westfield Marion

Construction
- Structure type: Ground
- Parking: No
- Cycle facilities: No

History
- Opened: 1913

Services
Preceding station	Adelaide Metro	Following station
Emerson towards Adelaide	Flinders line	Woodlands Park towards Flinders
Emerson towards Adelaide	Seaford line	Woodlands Park towards Seaford
Location

Edwardstown railway station is located on the Seaford and Flinders lines. Situated in the inner south-western Adelaide suburb of Edwardstown, it is 7.9 kilometres from Adelaide station.

== History ==
Edwardstown railway station was opened in 1913.

Edwardstown railway station once had a goods yard, where SteamRanger restored its centenary carriages when it was received from the State Transport Authority. It is of an island platform construction, with pedestrian access at the northern and southern ends and the railway tracks on either side to the east and west. The station is unattended and there are no facilities, other than a shelter shed and public address system. The Edwardstown branch of the Freemasons is responsible for maintaining the station's landscaping.

== Services by platform ==
Platform	Destination/s
1	Seaford/Flinders
2	Adelaide
