= A4000 =

A4000 may refer to:

- Acorn Archimedes 4000, a 1992 computer
- Adelaide Metro 4000 class
- Amiga 4000, a 1992 Commodore computer
