= Goodwood railway station =

Railway station in Adelaide, South Australia

Goodwood
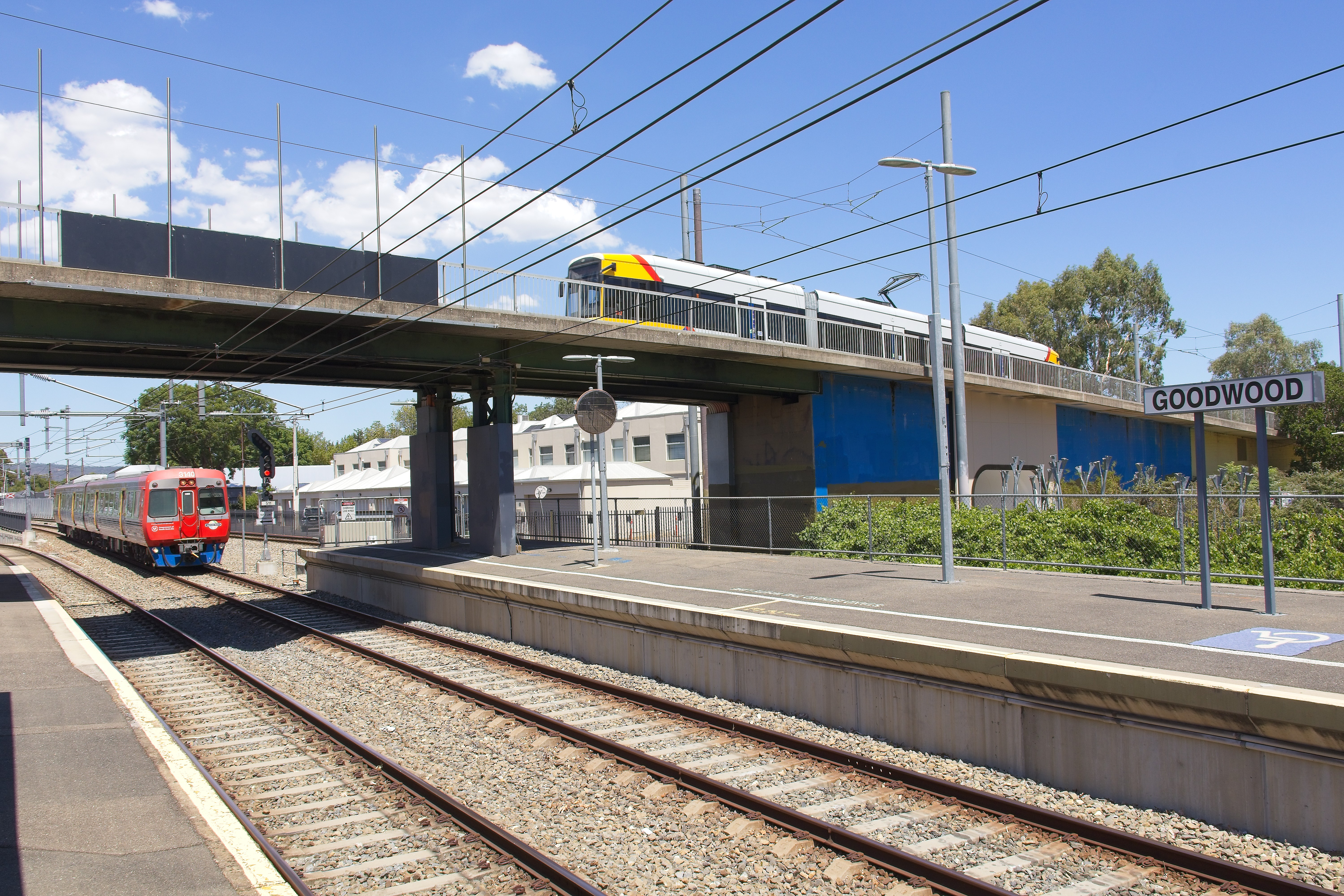
- Southbound view showing a train approaching the station while a tram crosses over the Goodwood Overpass, February 2026

General information
- Location: Railway Terrace North; Goodwood SA 5034
- Coordinates: 34°57′06″S 138°35′06″E
- Owner: Department for Infrastructure & Transport
- Operator: Adelaide Metro
- Line: Belair Flinders Seaford
- Distance: 5 km from Adelaide
- Platforms: 4 (2 island platforms) 1 platform disused
- Tracks: 4
- Connections: None

Construction
- Structure type: Ground
- Parking: Yes
- Cycle facilities: No
- Accessible: No

Other information
- Station code: 16522 (to City); 18580 (to Seaford, Flinders, Belair)
- Website: Adelaide Metro

History
- Opened: 5 March 1883
- Rebuilt: 1929

Services
Preceding station	Adelaide Metro	Following station
Adelaide Showground towards Adelaide	Belair line	Millswood towards Belair
Adelaide Showground towards Adelaide	Flinders line	Clarence Park towards Flinders
Adelaide Showground towards Adelaide	Seaford line	Clarence Park towards Seaford
Location

Goodwood railway station is a commuter railway station and the junction station for the Belair, Seaford and Flinders lines. The Belair line diverges south-east towards Millswood, while the Seaford and Flinders lines diverge south-west towards Clarence Park. The Glenelg tram line crosses over the railway lines at the south end of Goodwood station. The station services the Adelaide inner-southern suburb of Goodwood, and is 5.0 km from Adelaide station.

== History ==
Goodwood railway station opened on 5 March 1883 with the opening of the Adelaide to Aldgate section of the Adelaide-Melbourne line. It became a junction station in 1915 when the Willunga railway line (now the Seaford railway line) was constructed. Prior to 1929, what is now the Glenelg tram line was a railway line that crossed the main south line on a level junction. As part of its conversion from a broad gauge railway to a standard gauge tramway, a bridge was built to carry the trams safely over the railway lines.

Pre-1955, the Belair trains typically used Platform 1 for outbound services, and Platform 2 for inbound services, whilst the Willunga trains used Platform 3 for outbound services, and Platform 4 for inbound services. The yard immediately south allowed trains to transfer from any platform to any line. The most common use of this feature was when Inter/Intrastate freight and passenger trains would use the Willunga tracks to Goodwood from Keswick Rail Yards, then change to the Belair tracks through Goodwood Yard.

Prior to the One Nation gauge standardisation project in 1995, all four tracks at Goodwood were broad gauge, and the Belair line was dual broad gauge tracks. In 1995, the western track of the Belair line was converted to standard gauge, and the Belair line is now only a single track of each gauge.

Goodwood station was the main railway station servicing the Royal Adelaide Showgrounds. However between 2005 and 2013 during the Royal Adelaide Show, TransAdelaide closed Platform 1 at Goodwood, and exclusively devoted the easternmost of the four tracks between Adelaide and Goodwood to a non-stop shuttle service between Platform 1 at Adelaide station and a temporary platform at the Showgrounds named Showground Central. During this period, Belair line movements were merged with (the previously) Noarlunga Line movements through Platforms 2 and 3 at Goodwood. In 2014, Showground Central was replaced by the permanent Adelaide Showground station with existing services making additional stops.

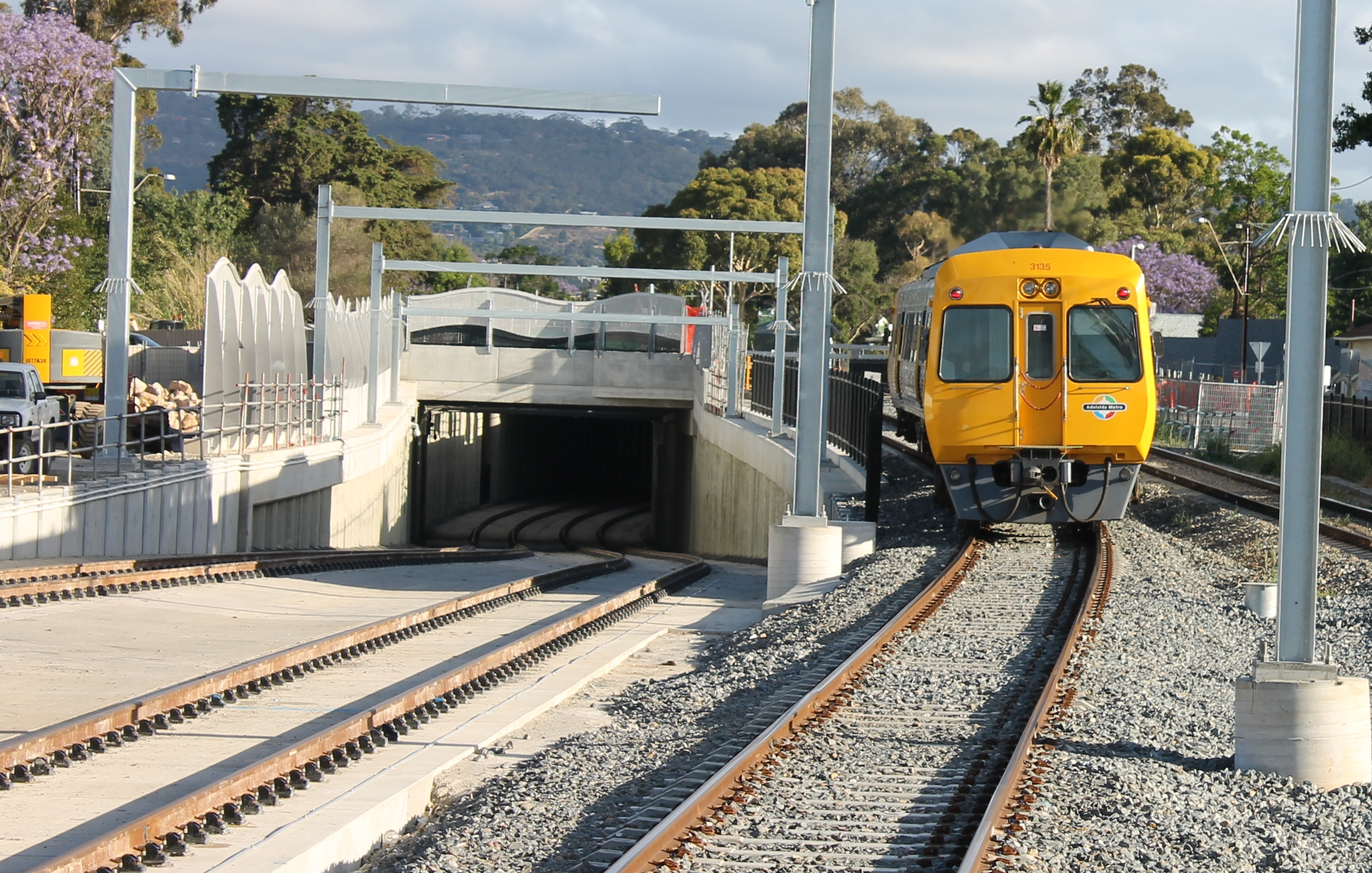
Train on the Belair line passing the underpass

=== Renewal ===
In 2013-14 tracks through the station were electrified along with the rest of the Seaford line. Platform 3 which is serviced by Belair trains is only electrified up to the South end of the platform which is where the overhead wires are pulled across to a pole. There is a sign there that states 'EMU do not proceed past this point.' Platform 3 is serviced by 3000/3100 class DEMU railcars.

The Goodwood Junction Upgrade separated the existing freight and Belair passenger lines from the Seaford line by a grade separation. A rail underpass near Victoria Street lowered the Seaford line below ground level, with the freight and Belair lines above. It was completed in 2014 along with the electrification of the Seaford line. A project to construct a footbridge adjacent to the Goodwood Overpass was announced in May 2016, and would provide a new access point to the station; though as of 2018 work has not commenced.

== Services by platform ==
Goodwood station has three platforms serving the three broad gauge tracks of the three southern metropolitan lines. The fourth and westernmost track, which is part of the standard gauge line to Melbourne, bypasses the no-longer-used fourth platform. From the north of the stations, there are four tracks between Greenhill Road and the station. The westernmost track is standard gauge, and the other three are broad gauge. After the Goodwood underpass construction, Belair trains used Platform 3 for outbound and inbound service, while Seaford and Flinders trains used Platform 1 for outbound service, and Platform 2 for inbound services.

Despite the tram line crossing directly over the station, there is no interchange with the tram here. The nearest tram stops are Stop 4 Forestville and Stop 3 Goodwood Rd.

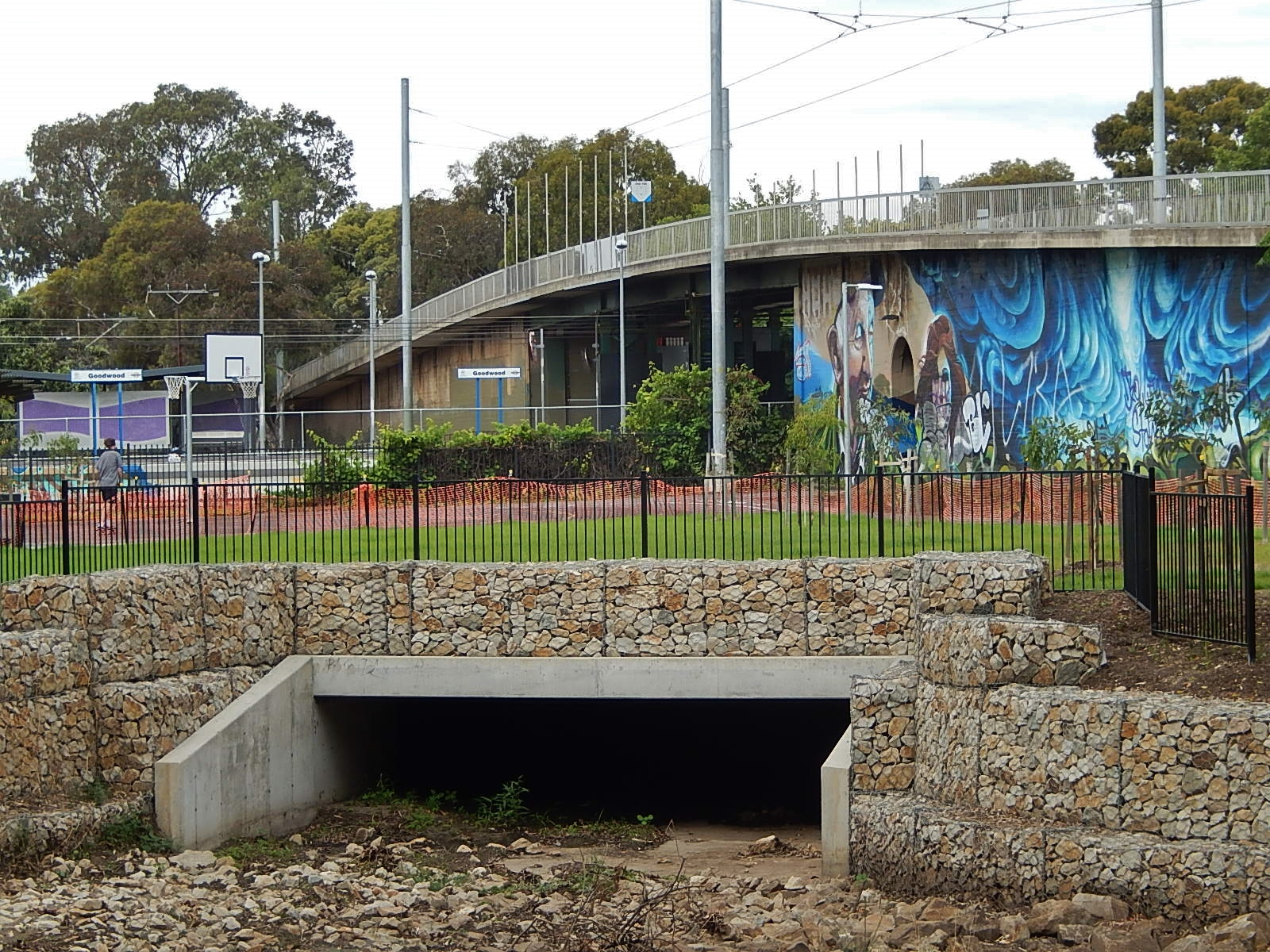
The Goodwood Overpass

Platform	Destination/s
1	Seaford/Flinders
2	Adelaide
3	Adelaide/Belair
