= Mitchell Park railway station =

Railway station in Adelaide, South Australia

Mitchell Park
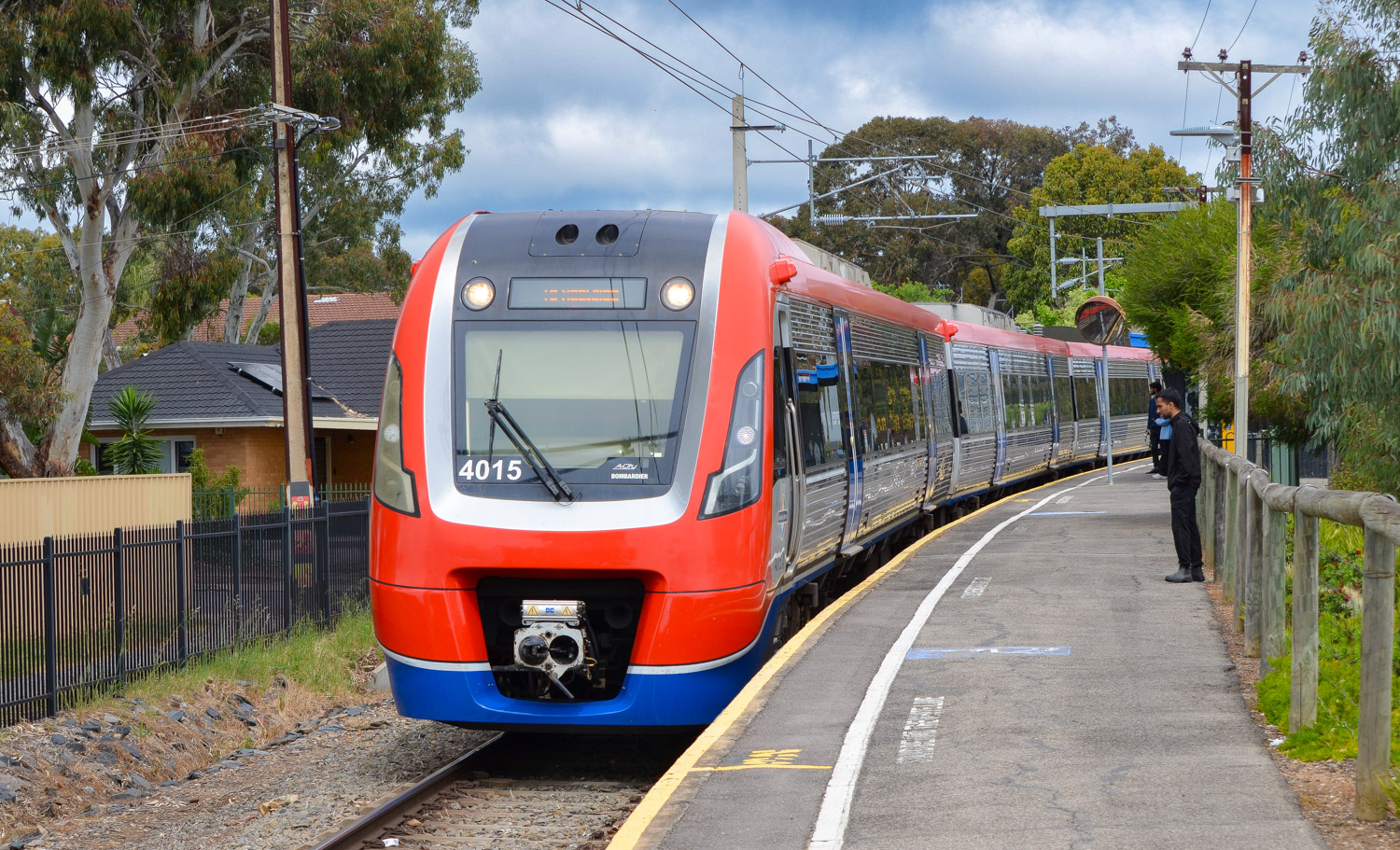

General information
- Location: Furner Road, Mitchell Park
- Coordinates: 35°00′08″S 138°34′01″E
- Owner: Department for Infrastructure & Transport
- Operator: Adelaide Metro
- Line: Flinders
- Distance: 11.5 km from Adelaide
- Platforms: 1
- Tracks: 1
- Bus routes: 213 to Westfield Marion; 297 to Westfield Marion
- Connections: Bus

Construction
- Structure type: Ground
- Parking: No
- Accessible: Yes

Other information
- Station code: 16544 (to City); 18588 (to Flinders)
- Website: Adelaide Metro

History
- Opened: 1966

Services
Preceding station	Adelaide Metro	Following station
Woodlands Park towards Adelaide	Flinders line	Tonsley towards Flinders
Former services
Preceding station	Adelaide Metro	Following station
Woodlands Park towards Adelaide	Tonsley line	Clovelly Park towards Tonsley
Location

Mitchell Park railway station is located on the Flinders line. Situated in the southwestern Adelaide suburb of Mitchell Park, it is 11.5 kilometres from Adelaide station.

== History ==
Mitchell Park station was opened in 1966. Since its opening, there have been no significant modifications to the station, besides paintwork or the addition of a newer speaker system.

== Platforms and services ==
Flinders has one side platform and is serviced by Adelaide Metro. Trains are scheduled every 30 minutes, with additional services in the morning and evening peak on weekdays.

Platform	Destination/s
1	Flinders/Adelaide

== See also ==
- List of Adelaide railway stations
- Adelaide Metro
