= Emerson railway station =

Railway station in Adelaide, South Australia

Emerson
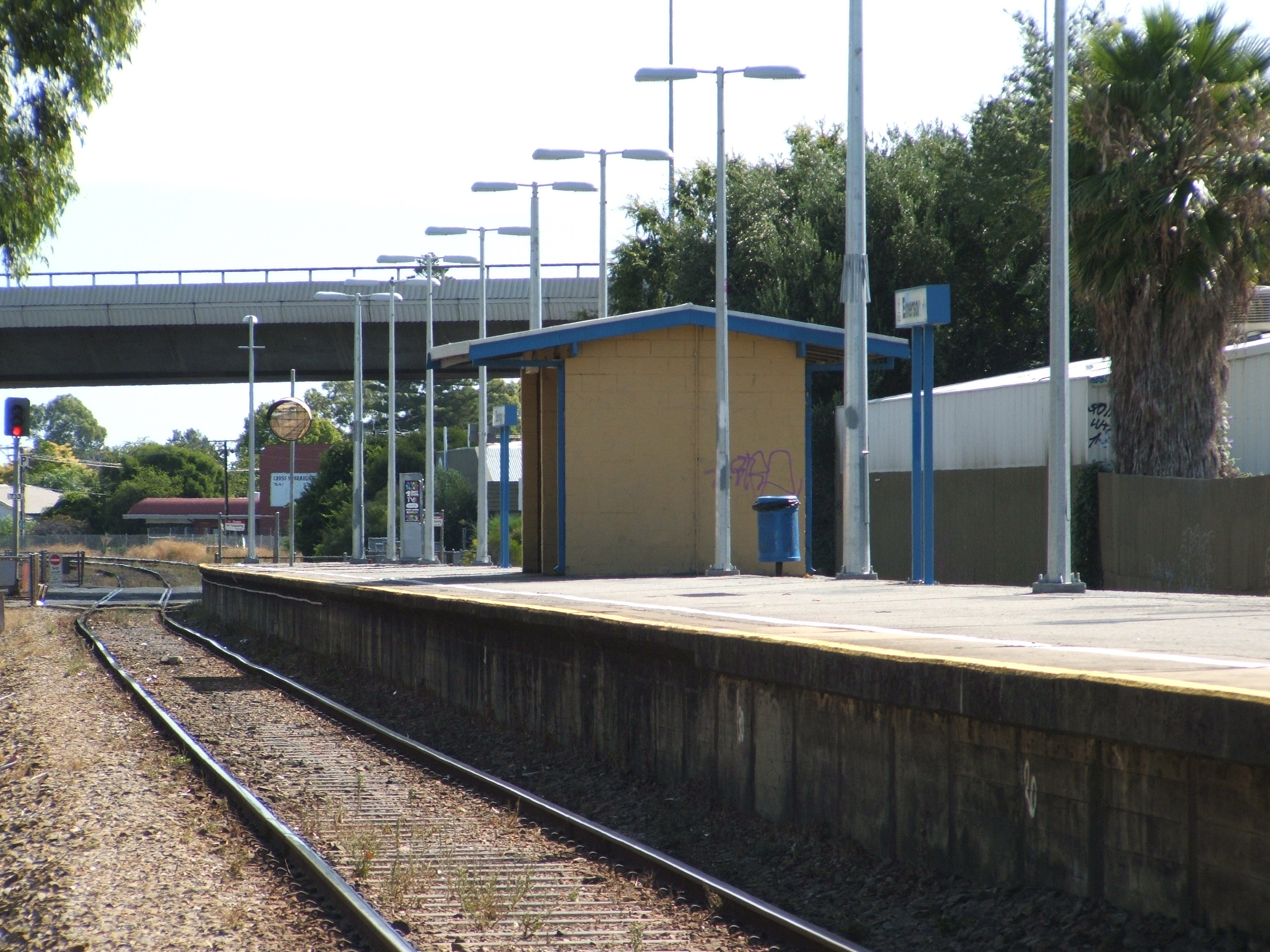
- South-west bound view of Platform 2, February 2008

General information
- Location: South Road, Black Forest
- Coordinates: 34°58′01″S 138°34′25″E
- Owner: Department for Infrastructure & Transport
- Operator: Adelaide Metro
- Lines: Seaford, Flinders
- Distance: 7.1 km from Adelaide
- Platforms: 2
- Tracks: 2

Construction
- Structure type: Ground
- Parking: No
- Cycle facilities: No

History
- Opened: 1913

Services
| Preceding station | Adelaide Metro | Following station |
|---|---|---|
| Clarence Park towards Adelaide | Flinders line | Edwardstown towards Flinders |
| Clarence Park towards Adelaide | Seaford line | Edwardstown towards Seaford |
Location

Emerson railway station is located on the Seaford and Flinders lines. Situated in the inner south-western Adelaide suburb of Black Forest, it is 7.1 kilometres from Adelaide station.

== History ==
Passenger trains first stopped at Emerson Station on Monday 16 July 1928. At that stage, all passenger trains stopped for the purpose of allowing passengers to join or alight, except those travelling to and from Willunga. Initially the station's name raised some criticism due to its perceived similarity to nearby Edwardstown railway station and the potential confusion that could result.

The road intersection immediately south of Emerson railway station was a complex junction of the railway and major connector roads, South Road and Cross Road. Debate occurred during planning for the duplication of the then Brighton Line in 1949, that a level crossing should be avoided due to the expected resulting congestion and an overhead railway bridge was proposed by the Highways Department.

In September 1952, a conference was held to discuss the Emerson Rail Crossing where once again a grade separation was proposed via an overland bridge or a subway. A bridge was not built at this stage, with automatic gates being installed instead with coordinating traffic lights. Between 1982 and 1984 a road overpass (Emerson Crossing) was built for South Road, which had then become a major arterial road.

In July 2008, Emerson station became the first station to install a Caution More than One Train (CMToT) warning device. The device activates when there are two trains in the vicinity by sounding an alarm and lighting up the warning message where people cross at the pedestrian maze. The installation of the CMToT warning device was as a result of incidents and many near misses where pedestrians were walking behind one train and not being alert to a second train coming from the other direction.

== Services by platform ==
| Platform | Destination/s |
|---|---|
| 1 | Seaford/Flinders |
| 2 | Adelaide |
