= Tonsley railway station =

Railway station in Adelaide, South Australia

Tonsley
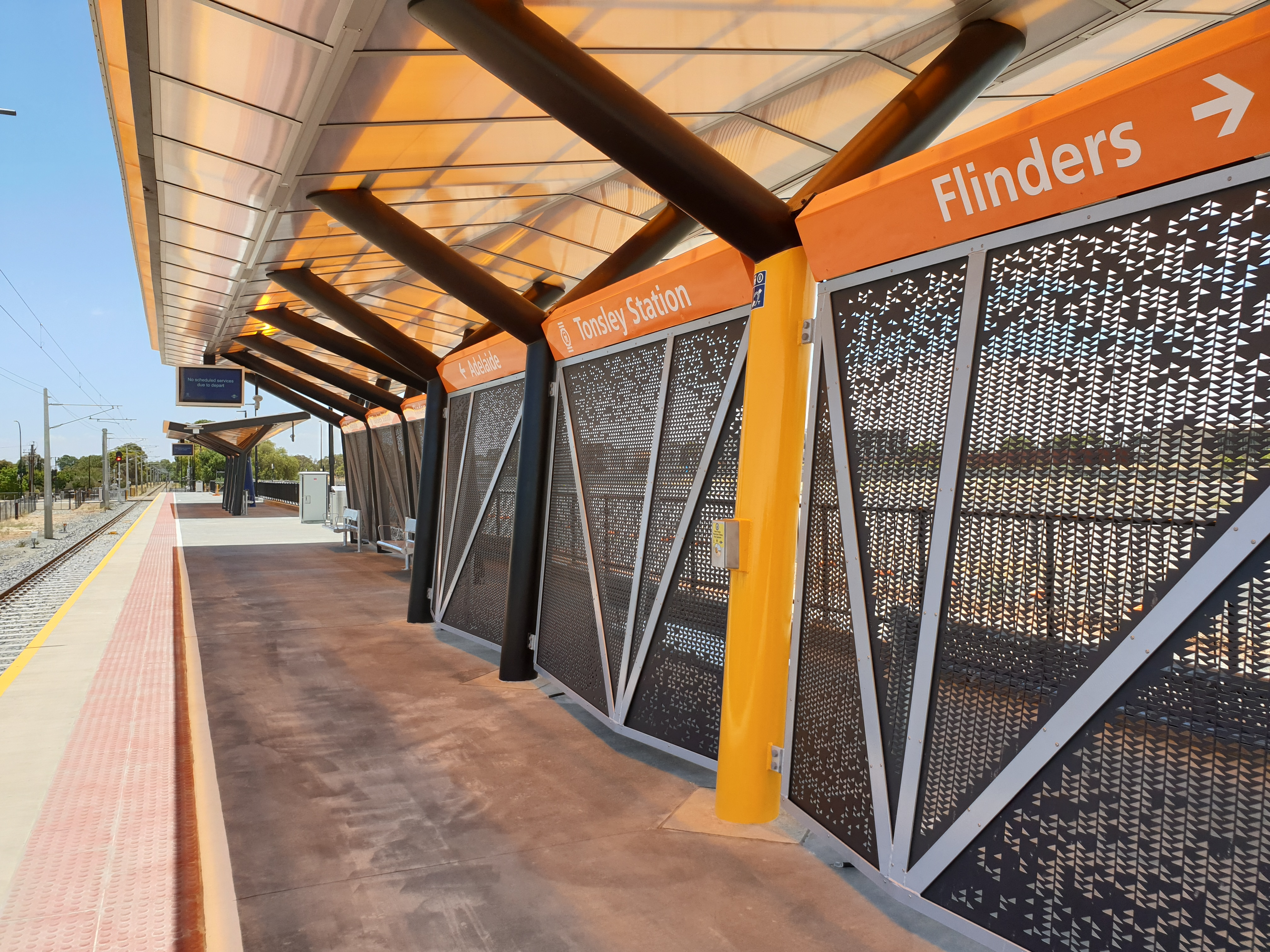

General information
- Location: Alawoona Avenue, Tonsley
- Coordinates: 35°00′33″S 138°34′02″E
- Owner: Department for Infrastructure & Transport
- Operator: Adelaide Metro
- Line: Flinders
- Distance: 12.2 km from Adelaide
- Platforms: 1
- Tracks: 1
- Connections: Bus

Construction
- Structure type: Ground
- Accessible: Yes

Other information
- Station code: 16503 (to City); 18589 (to Flinders)
- Website: Adelaide Metro

History
- Opened: 1 July 1966
- Closed: 28 June 2019
- Rebuilt: 29 December 2020

Services
Preceding station	Adelaide Metro	Following station
Mitchell Park towards Adelaide	Flinders line	Flinders Terminus
Former services
Preceding station	Adelaide Metro	Following station
Clovelly Park towards Adelaide	Tonsley line	Terminus
Location

Tonsley railway station is located on the Flinders line in the south-western Adelaide suburb of Tonsley, 12.2 kilometres from Adelaide station. The original station was 13 kilometres from Adelaide and was the terminus of the line from its opening in 1966 until the station's closure in 2019; the station was then relocated to its current position and opened in 2020.

== History ==
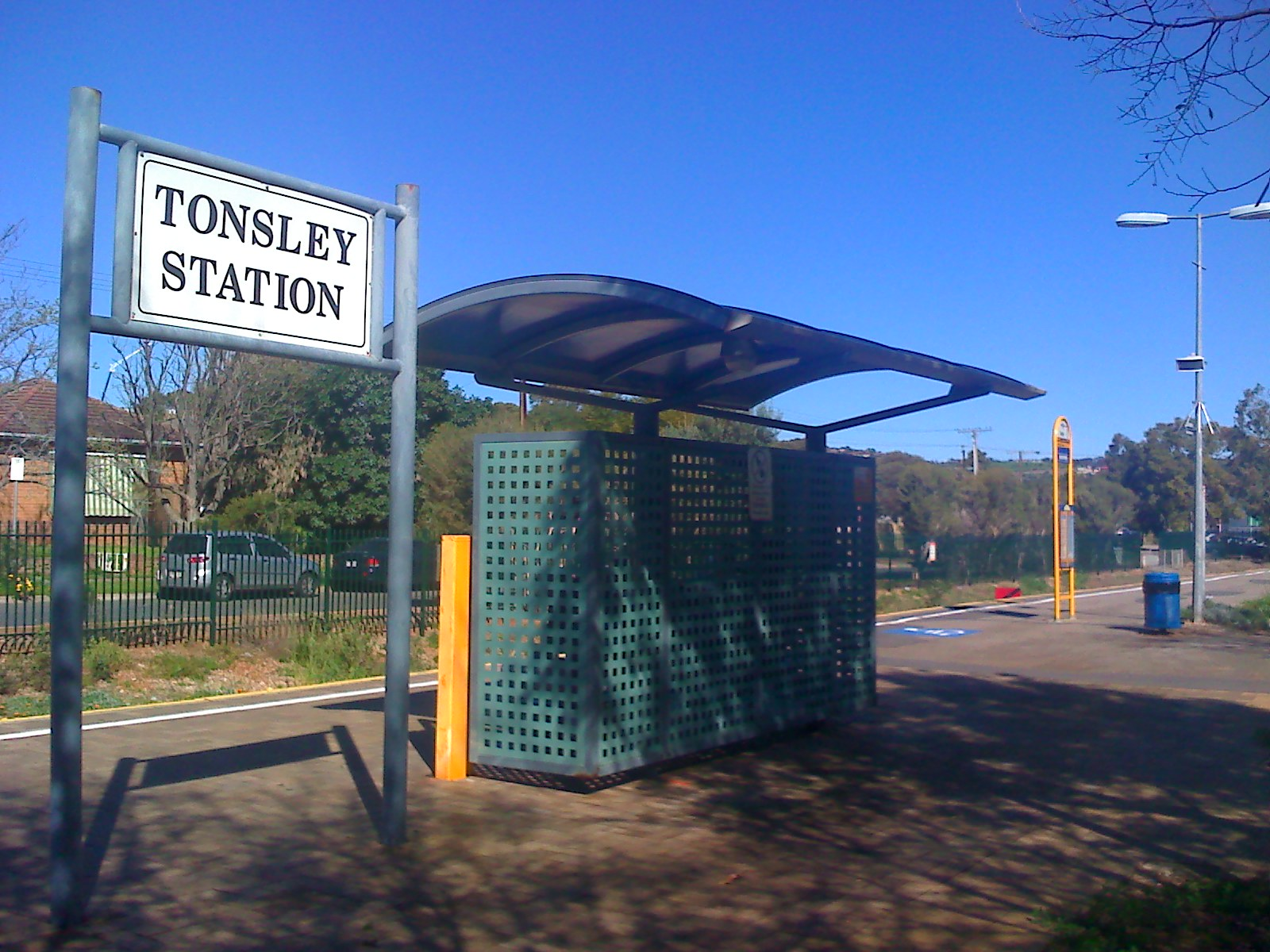
Original station (1966–2019)

The original station opened on 1 July 1966 when the Tonsley line opened. Trains operated between 07:00 and 19:00 on weekdays, with no weekend services.

To allow for extension of the railway to Flinders, Tonsley station closed on 28 June 2019 and was later demolished. The site of the former station is now occupied by the start of a viaduct that continues the railway over Sturt Road and Main South Road to terminate at Flinders station, adjacent to the Flinders Medical Centre. It was built concurrently with the associated Darlington Upgrade Project.

The replacement of Tonsley station with Flinders station was contested by local residents, who submitted a petition to keep Tonsley station. The Department of Planning, Transport & Infrastructure published a revised plan which would see a new Tonsley station built concurrently with the Flinders extension; located immediately south of Alawoona Avenue before the elevated section of track, the new Tonsley station replaces Clovelly Park station in serving the Tonsley Development Precinct and associated housing development. The new Tonsley railway station opened on 29 December 2020.

== Platforms and services ==
Flinders has one side platform and is serviced by Adelaide Metro. Trains are scheduled every 30 minutes, with additional services in the morning and evening peak on weekdays.

Platform	Destination/s
1	Flinders/Adelaide
