= Ascot Park railway station =

Railway station in Adelaide, South Australia

Ascot Park
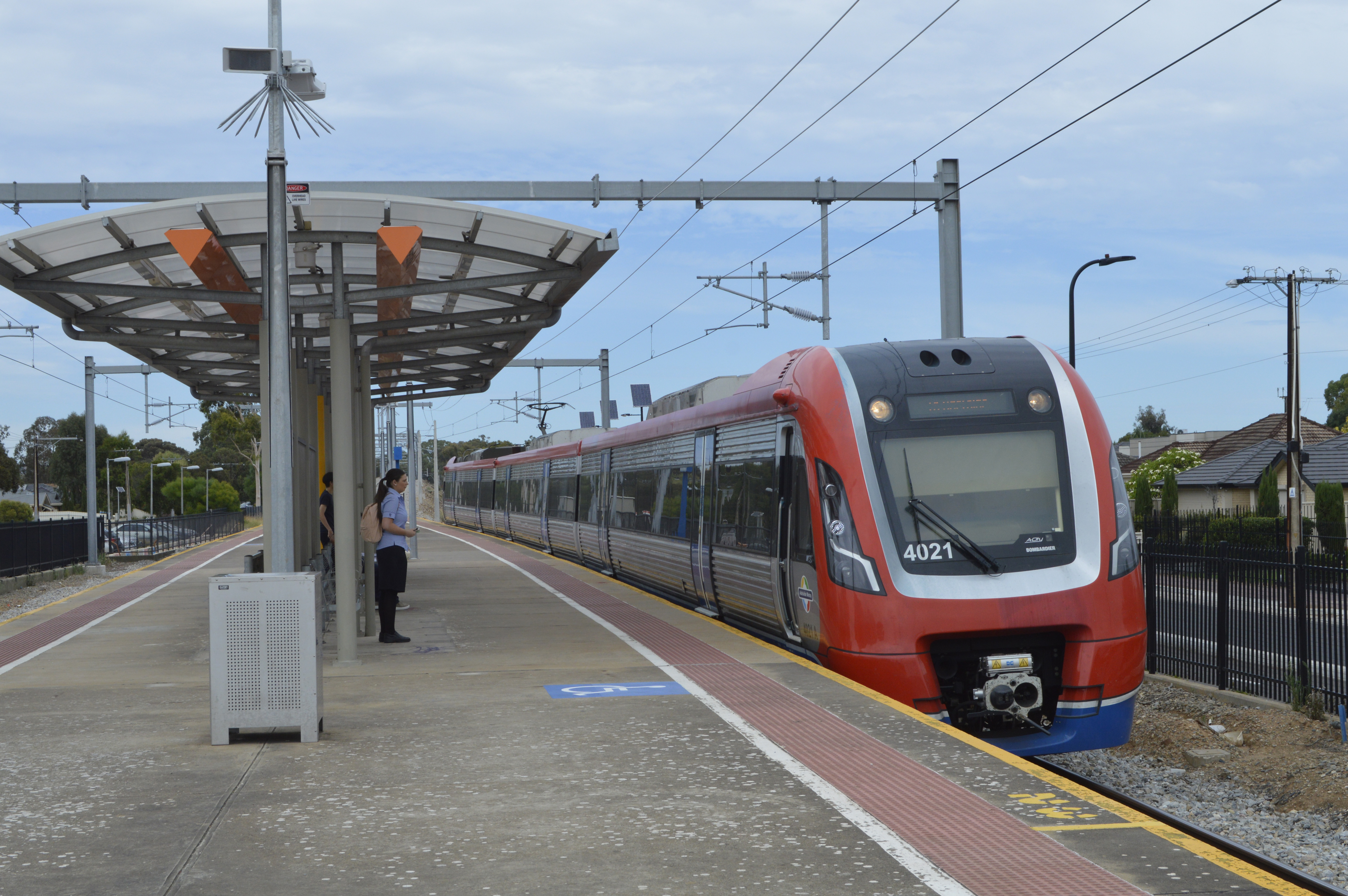
- North-west bound view from Platform 2, with an Adelaide Metro 4000 class arriving at the station, January 2018

General information
- Location: Railway Terrace, Ascot Park
- Coordinates: 34°59′29″S 138°33′40″E
- Owner: Department for Infrastructure & Transport
- Operator: Adelaide Metro
- Line: Seaford
- Distance: 10.2 km from Adelaide
- Platforms: 2
- Tracks: 2

Construction
- Structure type: Ground
- Parking: Yes

History
- Opened: 6 April 1914
- Rebuilt: March 1974; February 2014

Services
Preceding station	Adelaide Metro	Following station
Woodlands Park towards Adelaide	Seaford line	Marion towards Seaford
Location

Ascot Park railway station is located on the Seaford line. Situated in the south-western Adelaide suburb of Ascot Park, it is 10.2 kilometres from Adelaide station.

== History ==
Ascot Park was opened on 6 April 1914. When the Hallett Cove line was duplicated in 1955, the single platform was converted to an island platform. As part of a grade separation project to eliminate the Daws Road and Marion Road level crossings, the station was demolished and rebuilt, reopening in March 1974. The station shelters were replaced in 2014 when the line was electrified and extended to Seaford.

The station is located just south of where the Flinders line branches off. The station has two tracks, either side of an island platform with a pedestrian subway connecting the platform to the two adjacent streets.

== Services by platform ==
Platform	Destination/s
1	Seaford
2	Adelaide
