= Goodwood Overpass =

- Coordinates: 34°57′07″S 138°35′06″E
- Carries: Glenelg tram line
- Crosses: Adelaide-Wolseley railway line
- Locale: Goodwood
- Owner: Department of Planning, Transport & Infrastructure

Rail characteristics
- No. of tracks: 2
- Track gauge: 1,435 mm (56.5 in)

History
- Opened: 14 December 1929

The Goodwood Overpass carries the Glenelg tram line over the Adelaide-Wolseley railway line in Adelaide, Australia.

== History ==
When originally built, the Glenelg tram line crossed over the Adelaide-Wolseley railway line via a flat junction to the south of Goodwood railway station. As part of a project by the Municipal Tramways Trust to rebuild the tram line, an overpass was built in 1929. In 1978/79, the wooden deck was replaced with concrete. Although the overpass crosses over Goodwood railway station, there are no interchange facilities.
