= Flinders line =

Railway line in Adelaide, South Australia

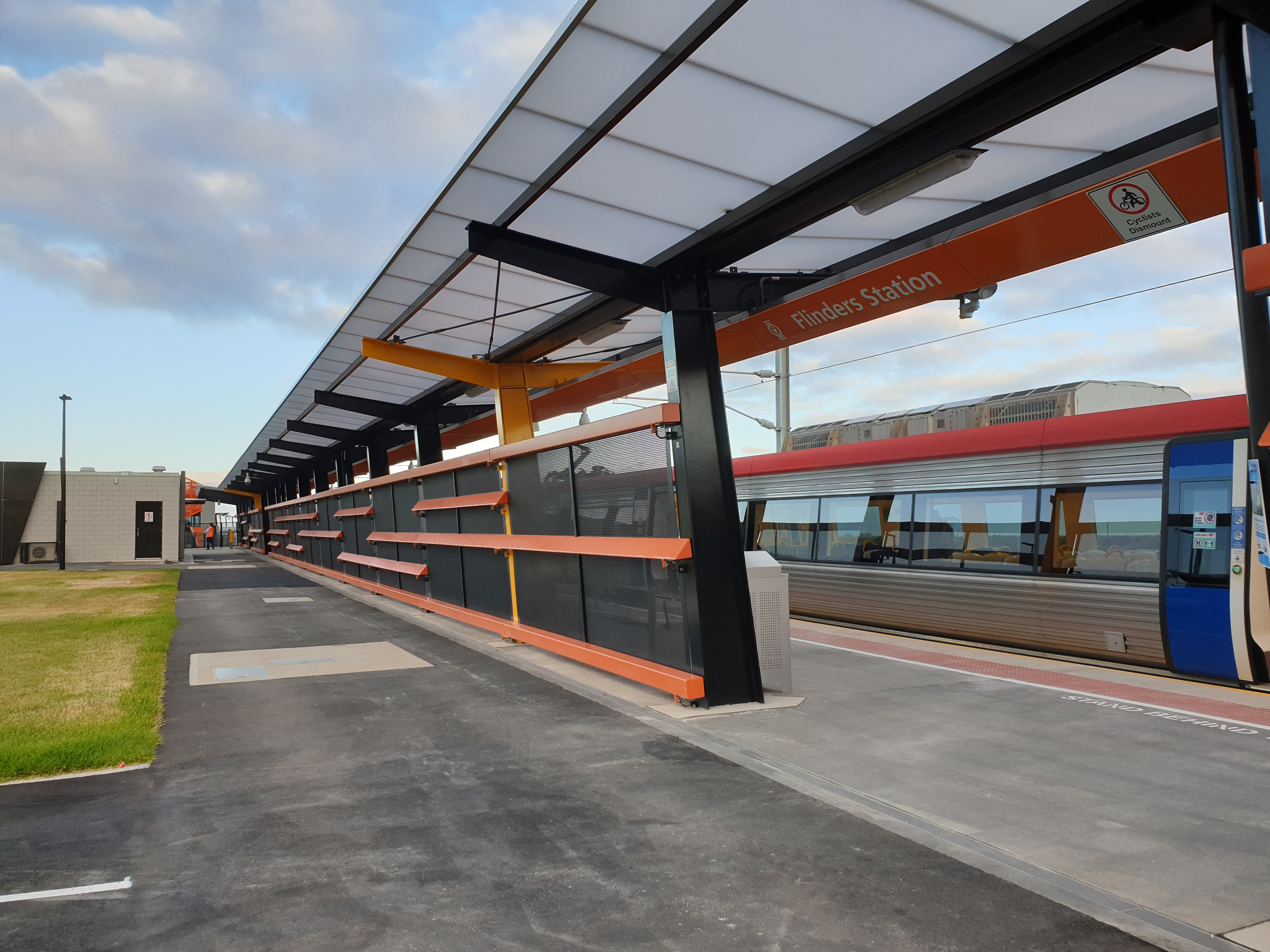
- Flinders station with a 4000 class EMU in the background

Overview
- Locale: Adelaide, South Australia
- Termini: Adelaide; Flinders
- Stations: 11

Service
- Type: Commuter rail
- Route number: FLNDRS, TONS (former)
- Operator: Adelaide Metro
- Rolling stock: 4000 class

History
- Opened: 1966
- Re-sleepered (concrete): February 2012–13
- Electrified: February–September 2013

Technical
- Line length: 13 km (8.1 mi)
- Number of tracks: 2 (to Mitchell Park); 1 (to Flinders)
- Track gauge: 1,600 mm (5 ft 3 in)
- Electrification: 25 kV 50 Hz AC from overhead catenary

The Flinders line is a suburban commuter line in Adelaide, South Australia, that branches off the Seaford line at Mitchell Park, and ends opposite Science Park, close to the Flinders University and the Flinders Medical Centre. The line is single track for most of its length, from Celtic Avenue, near Mitchell Park station, to its terminus.

== History ==
The railway was constructed between 1965 and 1966, as a branch line from Woodlands Park railway station on what was then the Willunga railway line, to serve the new Chrysler assembly plant at Clovelly Park. Construction of the plant had commenced in 1963, and the assembly line was opened in October 1964, remaining operational until it was closed in March 2008. Upon opening, the Tonsley line served three stations: Mitchell Park, Clovelly Park, and the original Tonsley station.

=== Re-sleepering and electrification ===
From 27 February 2012, the line between Woodlands Park and Tonsley was closed for reconstruction. During the closure, the line was duplicated between Tonsley Junction and Mitchell Park station, the track was re-sleepered with dual gauge sleepers to allow for the line to be converted to standard gauge at a future date, and the entire line electrified. The closure, initially planned to last one year, was extended until September 2013, to allow the electrification of the line, along with the Noarlunga Centre line. In late 2013, a plan was announced to convert the line to a double-track railway, to be funded through joint State and Federal initiatives, but the incoming Federal government announced it would be changing their focus to roads, and cut funding. Accordingly, with $18 million having been spent on the project, the future of the line was unclear. It eventually reopened on 5 May 2014, more than two years after closure.

=== Flinders extension ===
In July 2008, a feasibility study was commissioned by the government to extend the line to Flinders Medical Centre. On 13 May 2016, as part of its 2016 federal election campaign, the Liberal pledged $43 million for the project. The State Labor Party committed $42 million towards the project, the estimated cost of which was $86 million. The extension, referred to as the Flinders Link Project, would extend the line by 650 metres (2,130 ft) and replace the Tonsley station terminus on Sturt Road with a new terminus station adjacent to Flinders Medical Centre. An elevated single track, with a pedestrian and bike path, was to begin just north of the original Tonsley station site, and cross Sturt Road, Laffer's Triangle and Main South Road, before terminating at Flinders station. Clovelly Park station would be replaced by a relocated Tonsley station as part of the extension project.

The original Tonsley station was closed after the final service on 28 June 2019, allowing construction of the rail overpass at the station site. Services terminated at Clovelly Park station until the extension was completed. Built concurrently with the adjacent Darlington Upgrade for the Southern Expressway, major works took place from July 2019 to October 2020. The line was temporarily closed after the last service on 20 November 2020 for the extension to be commissioned, and fully reopened on 29 December. The operating hours of the line were expanded to include weekday nights and weekends. Before that, the line only ran between 6:30 am and 7:30 pm on weekdays, and was closed on weeknights and weekends.

== Line guide ==
Flinders Line
Name	Distance from Adelaide	Year opened	Serving suburbs	Connections
Adelaide	0.0 km	1856	Adelaide	Gawler Grange; Outer Harbor Port Dock Bus Tram
Mile End	2.0 km	1898	Mile End	
Adelaide Showground	4.0 km	2014	Keswick, Wayville	
Goodwood	5.0 km	1883	Forestville, Goodwood	Belair
Clarence Park	6.3 km	1913	Black Forest, Clarence Park	
Emerson	7.1 km	1928	Black Forest, Clarence Park	
Edwardstown	7.9 km	1913	Edwardstown	
Woodlands Park	9.1 km	1925	Ascot Park, Edwardstown	Seaford Bus
Mitchell Park	11.5 km	1966	Clovelly Park, Mitchell Park	
Tonsley	12.4 km	2020	Mitchell Park, Tonsley	
Flinders	13.7 km	2020	Bedford Park	Bus

=== Former stations ===
- Clovelly Park - opened 1966, closed 2020.
- Tonsley – original station opened 1966, closed 2019.

== Services ==
Trains to and from Adelaide operate every 20 minutes during weekday peak periods, every 30 minutes off-peak on weekdays, and on weekends into the late evening. Before the extension to Flinders, services operated between 6.30 am and 7.30 pm on weekdays only. Services were only extended to operate during weekday off-peak periods in 2004. Stations between Adelaide and Woodlands Park are also served by Seaford line trains, and stations between Adelaide and Goodwood are also served by Belair line trains. Prior to 2014, most trains were operated by 3000 class railcars, augmented at times by 2000 class railcars. Following the electrification of the line, the latter were no longer authorised to operate on the line and they were retired from service in 2015. The line is now operated by 4000 class electric multiple units.

== Gallery ==
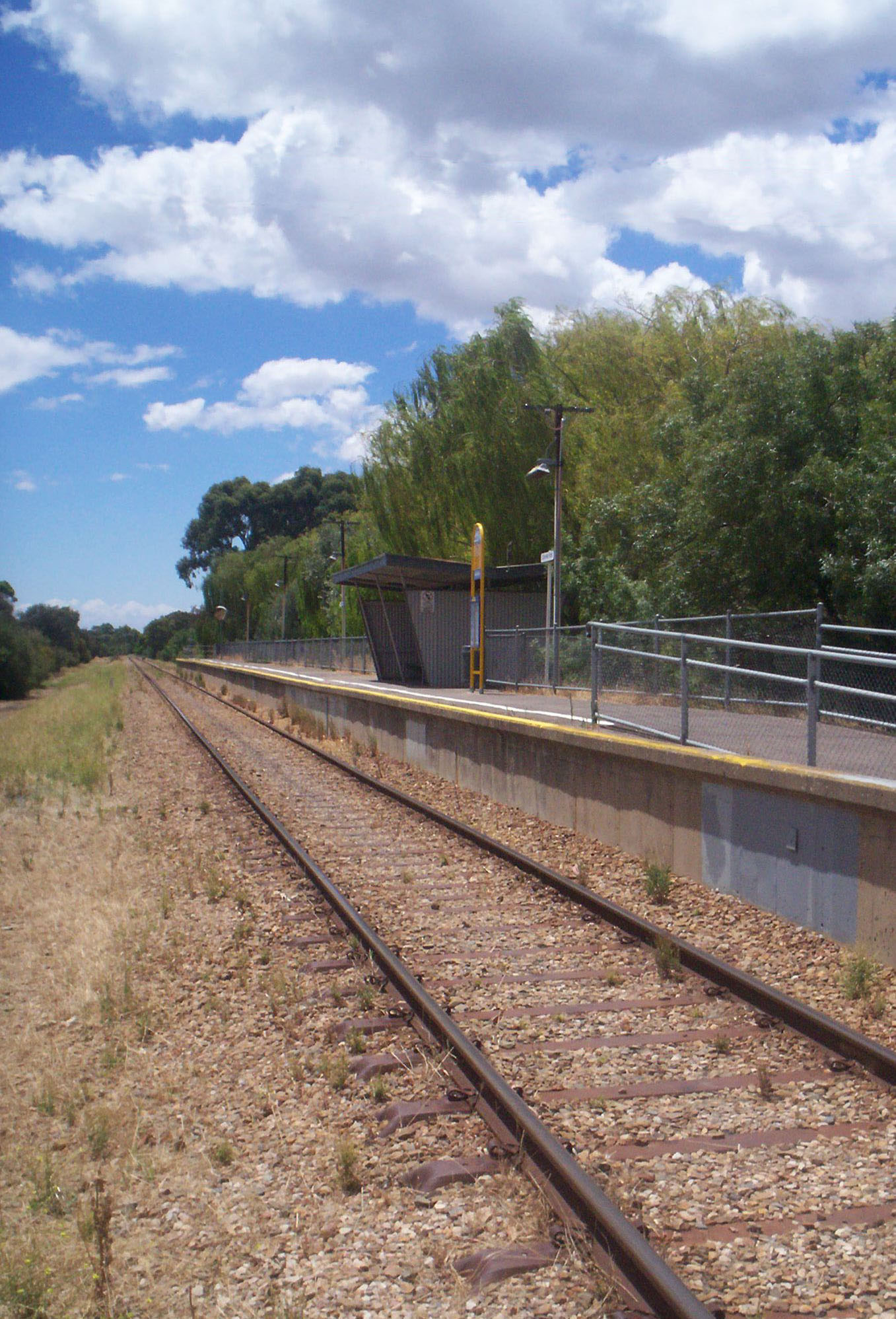
Former Clovelly Park station in 2007, now demolished

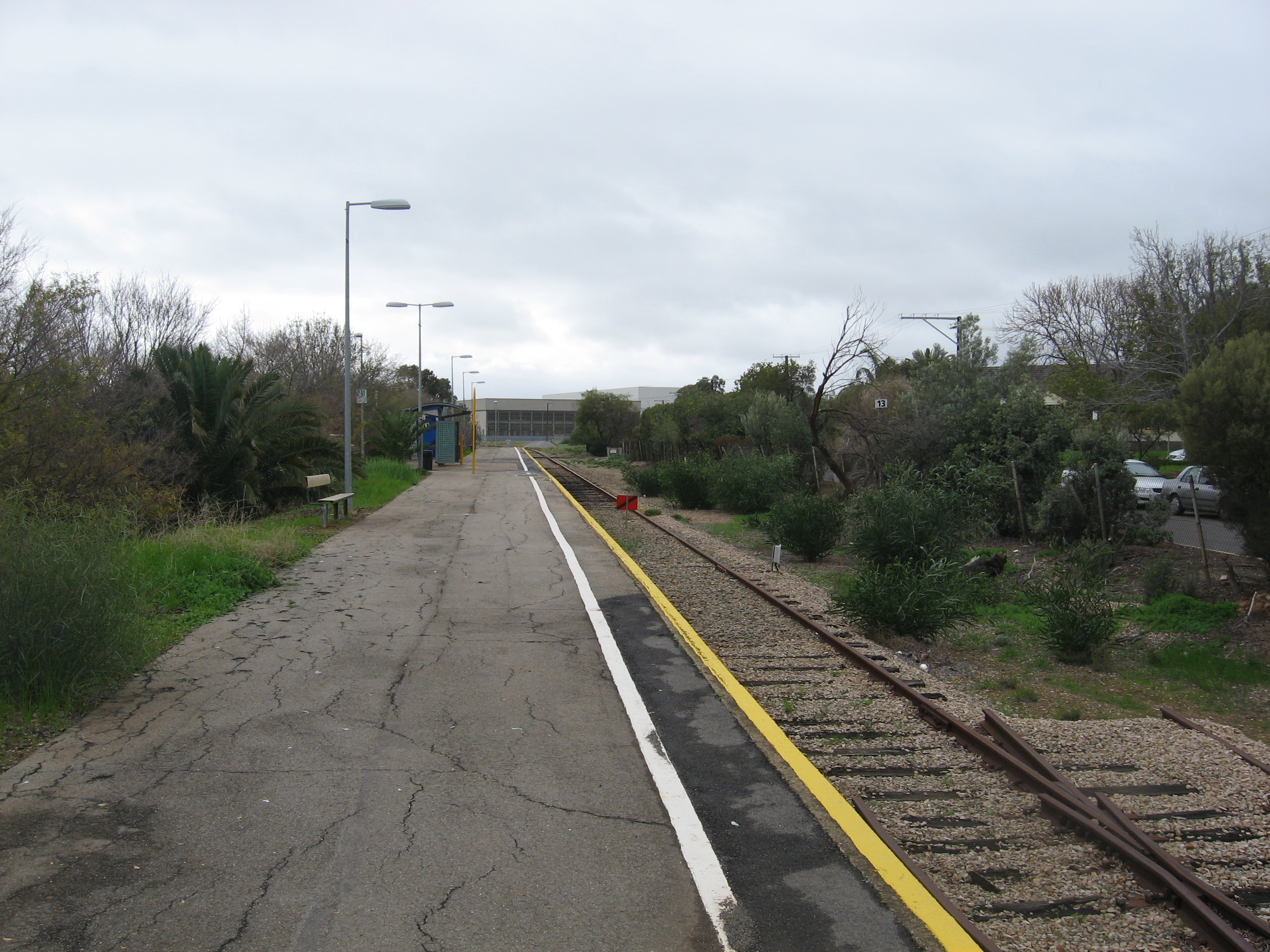
Former Tonsley station in 2009, now demolished

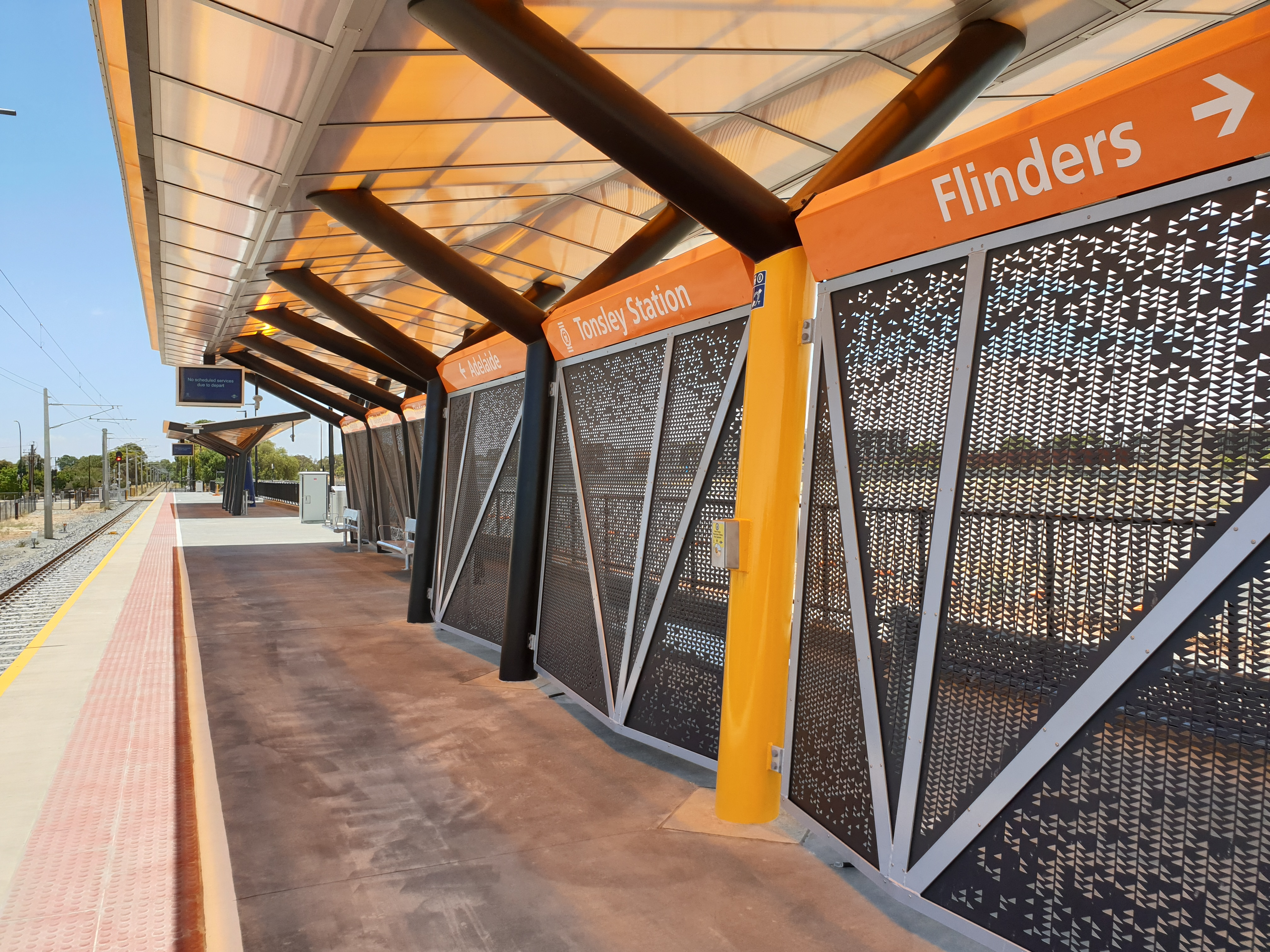
Tonsley station in 2020

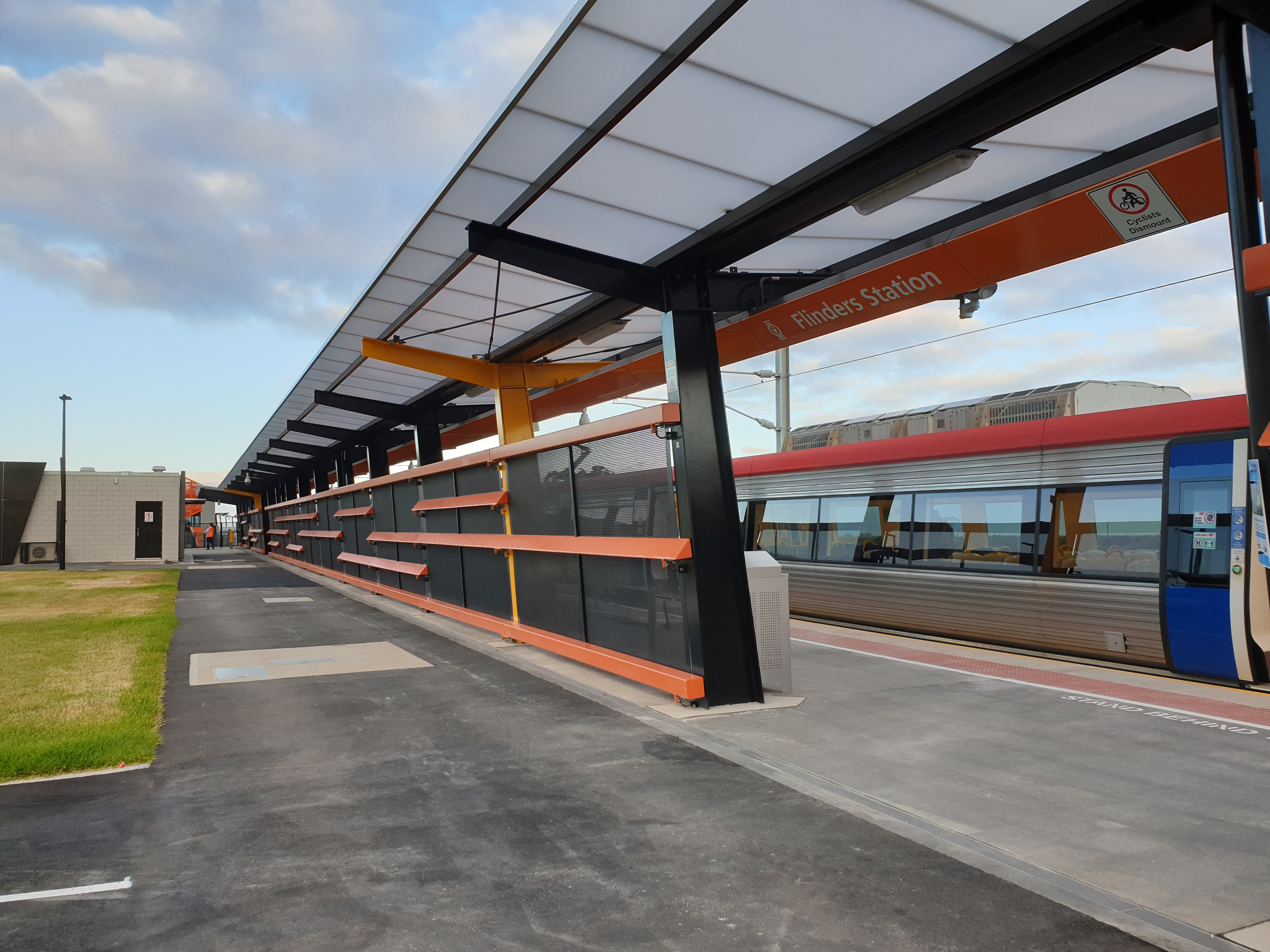
Flinders station in 2020
