= St Marys, South Australia =

St Marys
- Suburb
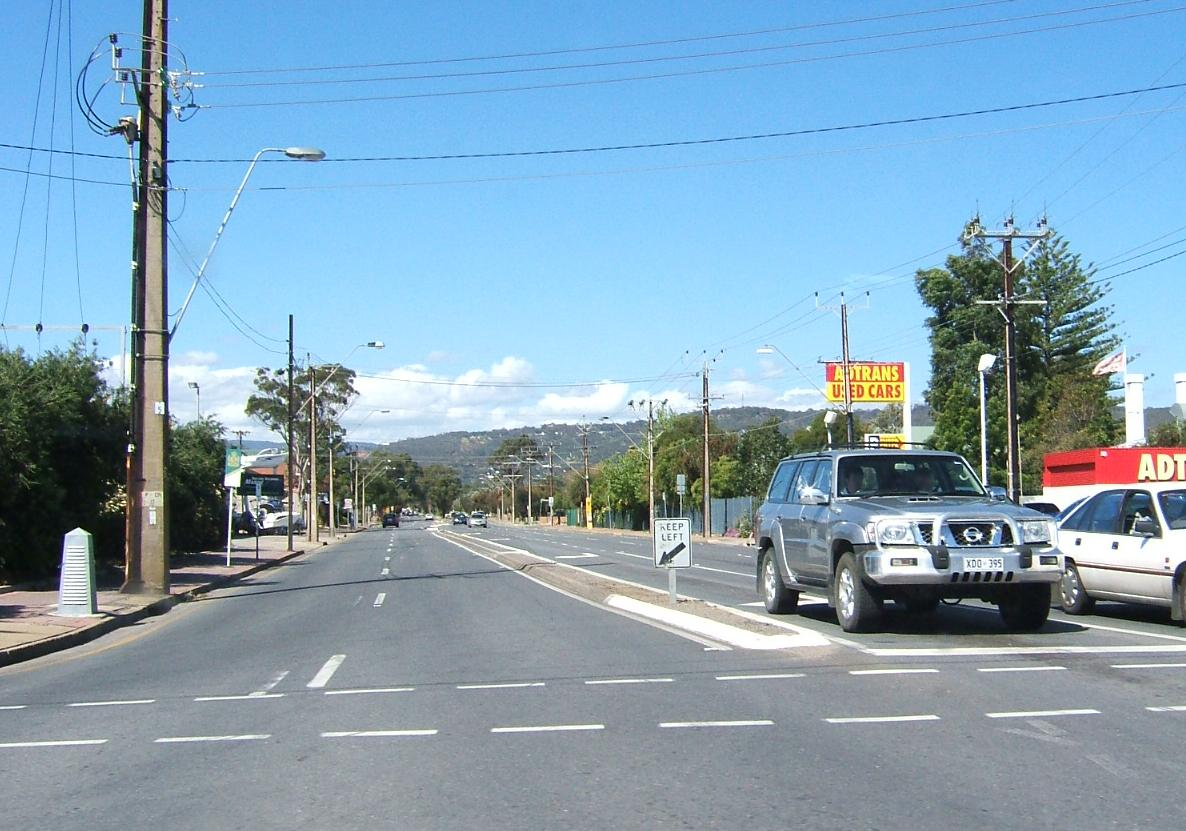
- Looking east along Daws Road. St Marys is to the right (south)

- Coordinates: 35°00′22″S 138°34′37″E
- Country: Australia
- State: South Australia
- City: Adelaide
- LGA: City of Mitcham

Government
  - State electorate: Elder
  - Federal division: Boothby

Population
  - Total: 3,010 (SAL 2021)
- Postcode: 5042
Suburbs around St Marys
Edwardstown	Melrose Park	Daw Park
Clovelly Park	St Marys	Pasadena
Bedford Park	Bellevue Heights	Eden Hills

St Marys is a suburb of Adelaide, South Australia, located to the south of the Central Business District. It is bordered by Daws Road (north), South Road (west), Cashel Street (east) and Mill Terrace (south). The suburb is located within the City of Mitcham local government authority. St Marys Park is one of the largest reserves within the suburb and was originally the training ground of the South Adelaide Football Club.

== History ==
St Marys was first farmed in the 1830s by the Daw and Ayliffe families. They were later joined by Herschel Babbage, Robert Torrens and Captain William O’Halloran.

Prior to the 1850s, the suburb was named St Marys-on-the-Sturt as, apart from farmhouses and the St Mary's Church of England, there were no buildings in the area from Daws Rd to the Sturt River until various shops were established on the northern side of the church. The suburb was an important wheat growing area for Adelaide until the northern areas of the colony came under cultivation when some of the St Marys properties were replanted with almonds, grape vines and olives.

John Wickham Daw subdivided the frontage of his property as St Marys Village and built a house on the corner of what is now South Road and Daws Road. In 1852, he sold the house and several hundred acres to Babbage. After Babbage's own home burnt down in 1875, he built a mansion that was known as "Babbage’s castle." Babbage built the mansion using a new building material, reinforced concrete, however he used salty water and the mansion immediately began to crumble. The family left the estate in 1896. A two-story hotel on the corner of South and Ayliffes Road, the Lady MacDonald Hotel was licensed in 1857. As a result of a spelling error by the sign writer, the hotel displayed the name Lady MacDonnell, an error that persisted for over 70 years. In 1909 the hotel became a temperance hotel and went into decline. In the 1930s it was sold as a home to Ted Grindell, the local council "garbo" until the ruins were demolished in 1966 and replaced with a car dealership.

During the Great Depression, the Babbage ruins provided shelter for a number of homeless families. In 1936 the Babbage estate was subdivided by William Brookman Watson as Castle Estate with the blocks being sold to visiting Royal Navy sailors as souvenirs of the British Empire. Watson himself moved into John Daw's corner house and on his death the property was purchased by Dr Hugh LLoyd who had a nearby surgery on South Road in Clovelly Park which later became the Clovelly Park Community Health Centre.

The increasing use of motor vehicles in the 1920s led to the subdivision of several farms in the area into the estates of St Marys Park, Castle Estate, Clovelly Gardens and South Road Estate. The Great Depression of the 1930s followed by World War II stifled land sales and by 1949 only 25 people were living in the estates. The land set aside for Kiley Reserve in the subdivision of Clovelly Gardens had already been used by the Darlington Motorcycle Club since 1920 for races and in 1930 the remainder of the subdivision was converted to a trotting track. In the 1940s the South Australian Housing Trust then bought the unsold blocks in St Marys to provide low cost housing for workers. Kiley Reserve was later acquired by the State Government for the South Road Primary School which was built in 1951. By 1960, the South Australian Housing Trust had built nearly 400 homes in St Marys. Construction of the Chrysler vehicle manufacturing plant in Tonsley Park in 1963 led to many support industries being developed in St Marys.

An unofficial Post Office was opened on South Road on 16 May 1927 but was discontinued in 1952 when postal services were taken over by a shop at 18 Quinlan Avenue. A purpose-built Post Office center was built on South Road St Marys in 1964 with postal services continuing at the shop until 1975 when they were transferred to the South Road office. The South Road office was renamed St Marys South in 1967 and closed in 1976. A Clovelly Park office opened in 1950, was renamed St Marys in 1967 and closed in 1991.

In 1964 the Watiparinga Creek was covered as part of the South West Drainage Scheme. A stone bridge built in the 1850s at the northern end of Ragless reserve, which allowed South Road traffic to pass over the creek, was buried when South Road was widened in 1965 and still exists beneath the road today. Springfield Creek also ran through the suburb and was the cause of substantial flooding during heavy rains. In the 1970s the creek was replaced by drainage pipes and covered.

=== St Mary's Anglican Church ===
In 1841, John Wickham Daw donated one acre of his farm for the establishment of the St Mary's Church of England. Erected on the present site of the St Marys Fire Station, by 1847 the stringybark-built building had deteriorated at which time a stone church was built on a new site 250 m to the south. The original church building continued in use as a school until 1928. The first person interred at the new cemetery was James Penn, the father-in-law of James Boucaut, a later premier of SA. The church and cemetery were consecrated by Bishop Augustus Short in 1849. The name of the St Mary's Church of England was changed to St Mary's Anglican Church in 1981.

=== St Marys Baptist Church ===
The Baptist Union granted a fellowship to the St Marys Baptist Congregation in 1953 with their first church being an iron and timber building relocated from Underdale to a site in St Marys. The current church was constructed adjacent to the original structure in 1965. The church operated a community kindergarten from 1953 to 1981.

=== South Road Primary School ===
South Road Primary School was opened in 1951 on land set aside for Kiley reserve in the subdivision of Clovelly Gardens which was never developed. A Junior Primary School was established adjacent to the Primary School in 1954. Due to declining enrollments as the suburb aged, the Junior Primary School site and buildings were sold to the Edwardstown Baptist Church in 1980 with the children accommodated in the Primary School buildings. The Primary School was closed in 1997 and the school grounds and oval were sold to the Edwardstown Baptist Church who financed the purchase through the sale of blocks of land in Kiley Court the following year.

=== St Bernadette’s Primary School ===
St Bernadette's Catholic Primary School was opened in 1952 and staffed by Dominican nuns. The school has been a target of arsonists with major arson attacks in 1990, 1997 and 2000. The four gum trees along the boundary of the St Bernadette's oval are the remnant of a double row of gum trees planted along South Road in the 1880s to counter over-clearing of the suburb.

=== St Marys Park ===
St Marys Park was opened in 1929 as the South Road Recreation Ground. Although they would use Adelaide Oval as their home ground, the South Adelaide Football Club established their clubrooms and conducted training here. In 1969 upgrading began to bring the oval to SANFL standards and the oval was officially made the club's home ground although home games would continue to be held at Adelaide Oval. In 1971 the ground was officially re-opened as Panther Park with an exhibition match between South Adelaide and the 1970 VFL premiers, Carlton. In 1973, South Adelaide built new clubrooms on nearby South Road. The club moved to a new home in Noarlunga in 1995 on completion of the Noarlunga Oval and in 1997 Panther Park was renamed St Marys Park.

== Points of interest ==
- Ayliffes Road was originally the driveway from South Road to the Ayliffe property in Pasadena.
- Benjamin Street was named by Benjamin Babbage himself in 1869 and the street's gum trees are all that remain of the native trees planted by Babbage on his estate.
- The olive tree in the front yard of No. 6 Donald Street, which was once part of an orchard planted by Babbage in the 1860s, was removed to allow subdivision of the property around 2020
- The large gum tree on the corner of The Crescent and Auricchio Avenue is a remnant of the original vegetation in St Marys.
- Auricchio Avenue was named after Mario Auricchio, a local developer who established the Vittorio Veneto Club in the 1930s as an apolitical alternative venue to the Fascio Italian Club which served the local fascist community.
- The junction of St Marys Street and Mingbool Avenue is wider than normal due to the drainage works of Springfield Creek beneath it.
- As of 2022, there are some 1960s built homes still being occupied by the original owners

== Sources ==
St Marys Walk City of Mitcham 2009
