= Adelaide Metro 4000 class =

Class of electric multiple unit trains

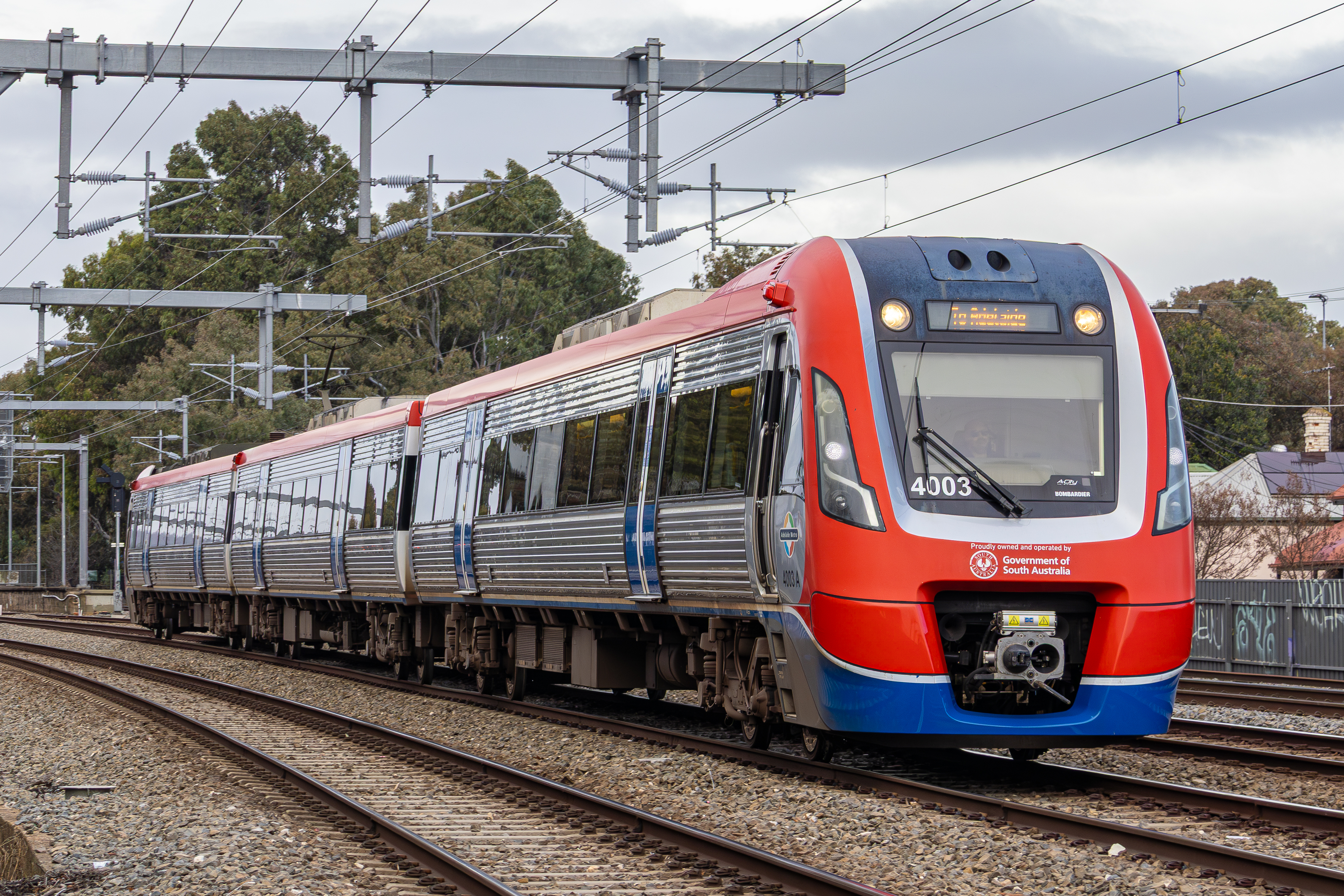
- 4000 Class near Goodwood Station

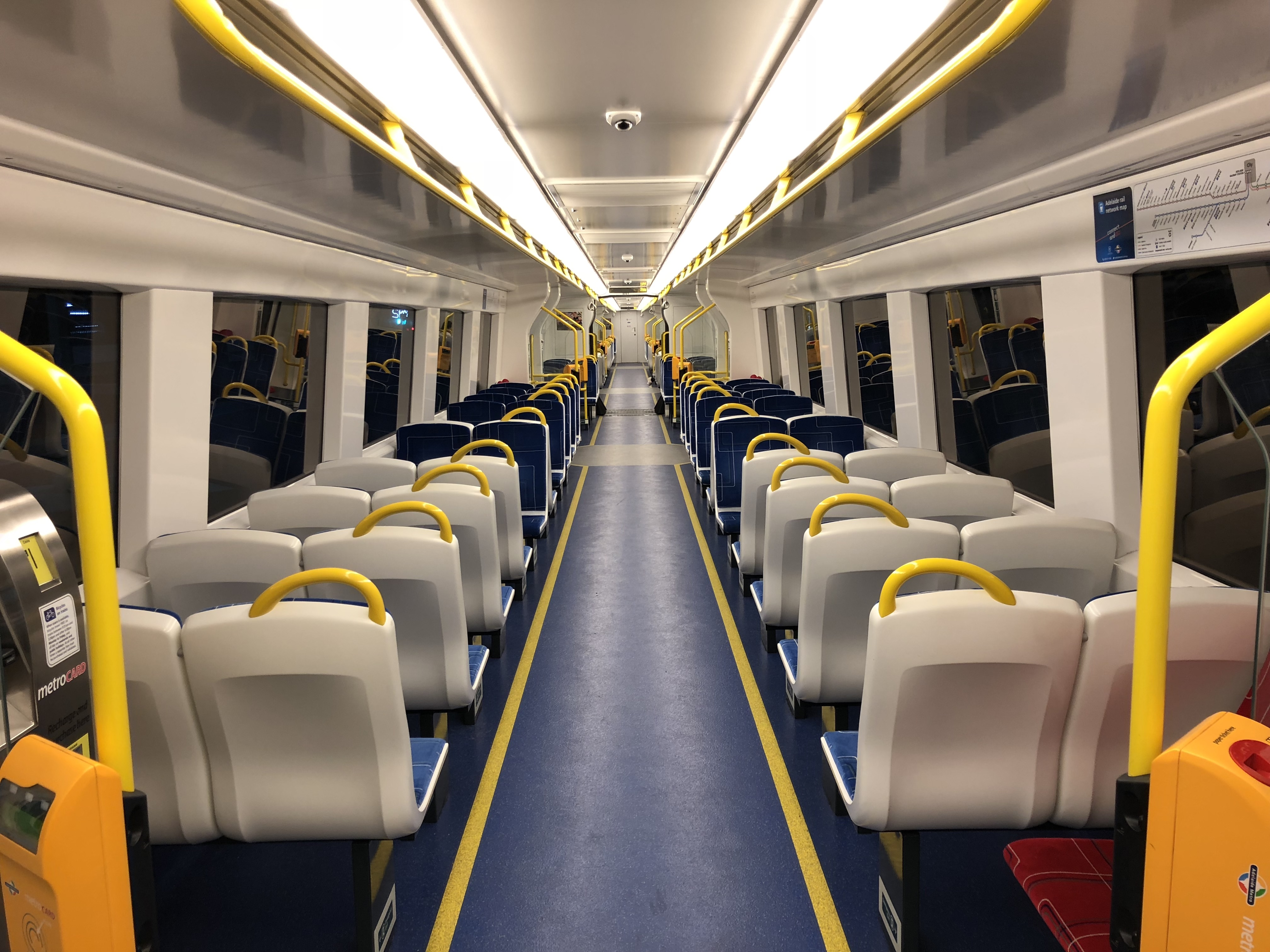
- Interior
- In service: 2014–present
- Manufacturer: Bombardier Transportation/Alstom (Note: Bombardier Transportation was acquired by Alstom on 29 January 2021, during construction of the second batch of A-City trains. This entire batch was delivered by Alstom.)
- Built at: Dandenong, Victoria
- Replaced: 2000 class railcars; 3000 class railcars (partially)
- Constructed: 2013–15 (first batch); 2019–23 (second batch)
- Entered service: 23 February 2014 (first batch); 4 March 2022 (second batch)
- Number built: 34 sets
- Number in service: 34 sets
- Formation: 3-car sets (DM1–T–DM2)
- Fleet numbers: 4001–4034
- Capacity: 540 (240 seated, 300 standing), 6 Wheelchair spaces
- Operator: Adelaide Metro
- Depots: Seaford Meadows; Dry Creek
- Lines served: Gawler; Seaford Flinders

Specifications
- Car body construction: Stainless steel
- Train length: 75.22 m (246 ft 9 3/8 in)
- Car length: 25,255 mm (82 ft 10 1/4 in) (DM); 24.71 m (81 ft 7/8 in) (T)
- Width: 3.05 m (10 ft 1/8 in)
- Height: 4.01 m (13 ft 1 7/8 in)
- Floor height: 1.2 m (3 ft 11 1/4 in)
- Doors: 2 × 2 per car
- Wheel diameter: 920–850 mm (36–33 in) (new–worn)
- Wheelbase: 2.5 m (8 ft 2 in)
- Maximum speed: 110 km/h (68 mph)
- Traction system: MITRAC water-cooling IGBT–VVVF
- Traction motors: 8 × MJA 280-6 200 kW (268 hp) 3-phase AC induction motor
- Power output: 1.6 MW (2,146 hp)
- Acceleration: 0.8 m/s^{2} (2.6 ft/s^{2})
- Deceleration: 1.12 m/s^{2} (3.7 ft/s^{2}) (service); 1.2 m/s^{2} (3.9 ft/s^{2}) (emergency)
- HVAC: 56.6 kW (75.9 hp) cooling, 30 kW (40 hp) heating; Cab: 5 kW (6.7 hp) cooling, 3.1 kW (4.2 hp) heating
- Electric system: 25 kV 50 Hz AC (nominal) from overhead catenary
- Current collection: Pantograph
- UIC classification: Bo′Bo′+2′2′+Bo′Bo′
- Bogies: FLEXX Metro 3000
- Braking system: Wheel-mounted disc brakes
- Coupling system: Dellner
- Multiple working: Within class
- Track gauge: 1,600 mm (5 ft 3 in); Convertible to 1,435 mm (4 ft 8 1/2 in)

The Adelaide Metro 4000 class, also referred to as A-City trains, are electric multiple unit trains built by Bombardier Transportation (later Alstom) in Dandenong, Victoria for the electrified Adelaide rail network. They are the only class of operational electric trains in South Australia, running services on the Gawler, Seaford and Flinders lines.

== History ==
In the 2008/09 State Budget, it was announced that five out of six of Adelaide's railway lines were to be electrified commencing with the Noarlunga and Gawler lines. This was to have resulted in 58 of the 3000/3100 class railcars being converted to electric operation with the remaining 12 to be retained as diesels for operation on the Belair line. The electrification was scaled back and Bombardier Transportation was awarded a contract to build 22 three-carriage trains for the Adelaide rail network in 2011 instead. The first of these trains were delivered in July 2013, and entered service on 23 February 2014 on the Seaford and Tonsley (now Flinders) lines. The last entered service in October 2015. Their design shared similarities to the V/Line VLocity and Transperth B-series trains, also built by Bombardier.

When they were ordered, it was proposed that the Gawler line would be electrified, which would allow the trains to access Adelaide Metro's Dry Creek depot. However, before they were delivered, that project was temporarily cancelled. Whilst light maintenance was performed at their primary stabling point at Seaford Meadows, heavy maintenance needed to occur at Dry Creek. When required, each train was hauled there from Adelaide station by a pair of 3000 class railcars. This movement was ceased once the Gawler line was electrified in 2022.

In June 2019, a further 12 train sets were ordered for the Gawler line electrification, the first of which was delivered in mid-late 2021 and entered service on 4 March 2022. The latter were built by Alstom.

The horn of a 4000 class train
