= Mitchell Park, South Australia =

Mitchell Park
- Suburb
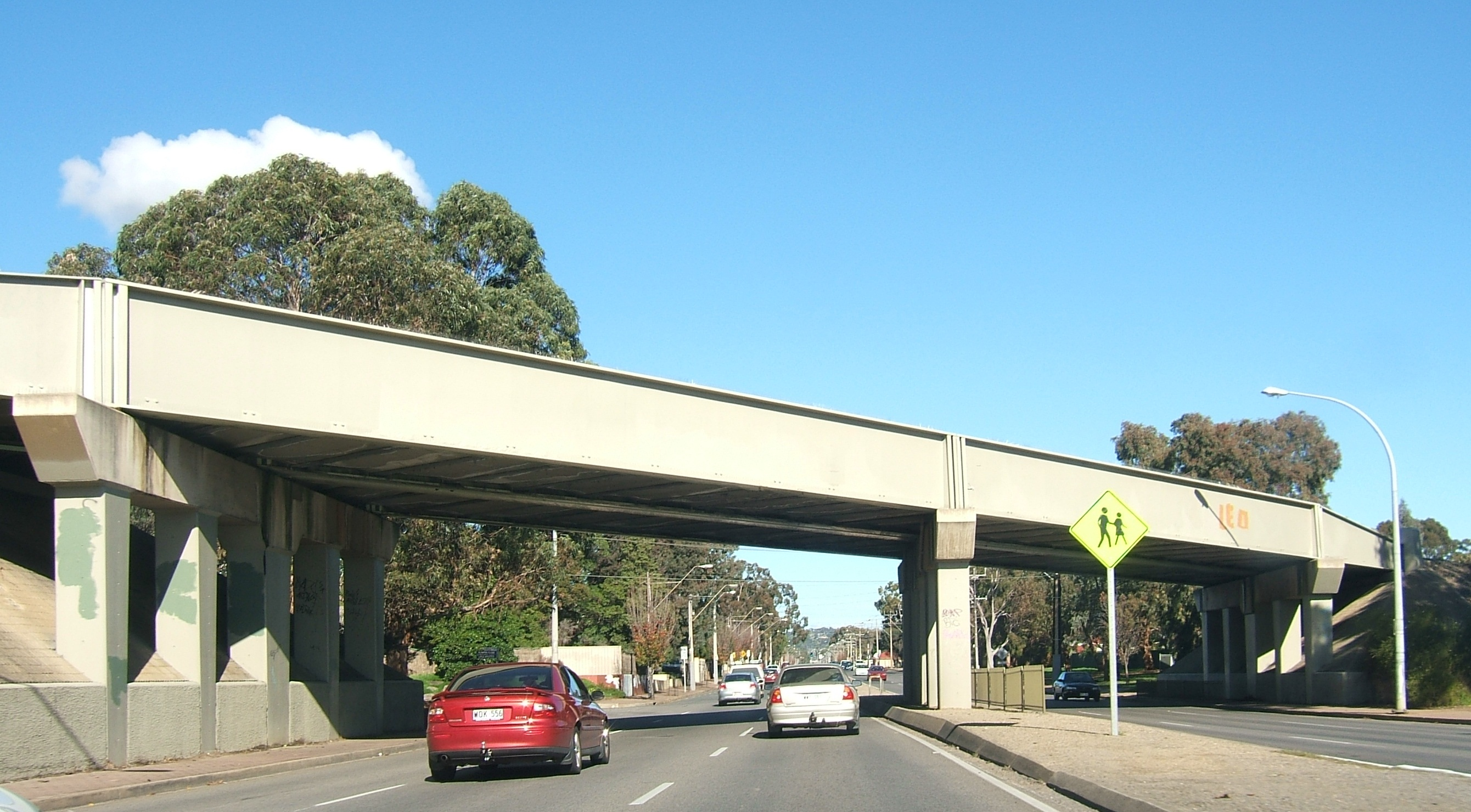
- Seaford railway line overpass, looking south from Marion Road

- Country: Australia
- State: South Australia
- City: Adelaide
- LGA: City of Marion

Population
  - Total: 5,754 (SAL 2021)
- Postcode: 5043

Mitchell Park is a suburb south of Adelaide. It shares common boundaries with Marion, Bedford Park, Clovelly Park, and Ascot Park. In recent years it has undergone major redevelopments through a program of urban renewal which included the renovation of many properties owned by the former South Australian Housing Trust. These projects have won many awards.

The Flinders railway line forms the eastern boundary of Mitchell Park.

== See also ==
- List of Adelaide suburbs
