= Flinders Medical Centre =

Coordinates: 35.021426°S 138.568811°E

- Flinders Medical Centre, looking towards the main entrance

Geography
- Location: Flinders Dr, Bedford Park, South Australia, Australia

Organisation
- Care system: Public Medicare (AU)
- Type: General

Services
- Emergency department: 24 hour
- Beds: 593

History
- Founded: 1976

Links
- Lists: Hospitals in Australia

Flinders Medical Centre (FMC) is a major public tertiary hospital and teaching school, co-located with Flinders University and the 130 bed Flinders Private Hospital located at Bedford Park, South Australia. It opened in 1976. It serves as the trauma centre for the southern suburbs, and parts of the Adelaide Hills. An around-the-clock emergency retrieval service brings patients to FMC by road or helicopter.

FMC is part of the Southern Adelaide Local Health Network (SALHN) which includes the Noarlunga Hospital, Drug and Alcohol Services South Australia and a range of outreach and community-based services.

== Redevelopment since 2002 ==
The State Government invested over $193 million in Flinders Medical Centre between 2002 and 2013, including significant infrastructure builds and increasing capacity and services provided at the hospital to make it the major hospital for the southern suburbs of Adelaide.

In February 2003, the Rann government approved funding for the construction of an acute mental health building at the Flinders Medical Centre. The building was named after Margaret Tobin, former Director of Mental Health who was murdered in her office in October 2002.

A new south wing building was constructed, which includes a Maternity and Gynaecology Unit, as well as a Birthing and Assessment Suite. The Emergency Department was redeveloped and now includes a paediatric emergency area, time critical bays and an ambulance deck. The Intensive and Critical Care Unit was also expanded by eight beds, increasing the number of beds to 32. A new Acute Medical Unit was built alongside the Emergency Department.

Other construction included a 20-bed Cardiac Care Unit, an MRI and CT imaging facility, a larger operating theatre suite which included ten operating theatres. The paediatric inpatient ward was refurbished and a decked car park was built.

Significant site engineering infrastructure was upgraded and Central Sterilising Services Department facilities were refurbished.

== Redevelopment since 2010 ==
In November 2009 Premier Mike Rann announced additional funding for the Flinders Centre for Innovation in Cancer, with links to Livestrong, which was opened in 2012 with more than 100 researchers working on cancer prevention, treatment and care.

After completion of the $193 million in previous investment, the State Government committed a further $185.5 million to improve and upgrade facilities at FMC. Construction was to include a new rehabilitation centre (with 55 rehabilitation beds, new gyms and a hydrotherapy pool), Southern Adelaide Palliative Services will relocate to Level 5 of the new rehabilitation building (with shared spaces and a large rooftop garden), a new 1780 space multi-deck car park (1220 more spaces than before the redevelopment commenced), a dedicated orthogeriatric service and a new centre for the Older Persons’ Mental Health Service.

Construction of the new facilities was due for completion in the second half of 2017.

== Proposed development ==
On 19 June 2017, the Weatherill State Government announced two additional operating theatres would be built at Flinders Medical Centre, taking the number of theatres from 10 to 12. The State Government also announced the Emergency Department at Flinders Medical Centre would be expanded by approximately 12 additional emergency cubicles and a paediatric resuscitation room.
