= Flinders railway station =

Railway station in Adelaide, South Australia

Flinders
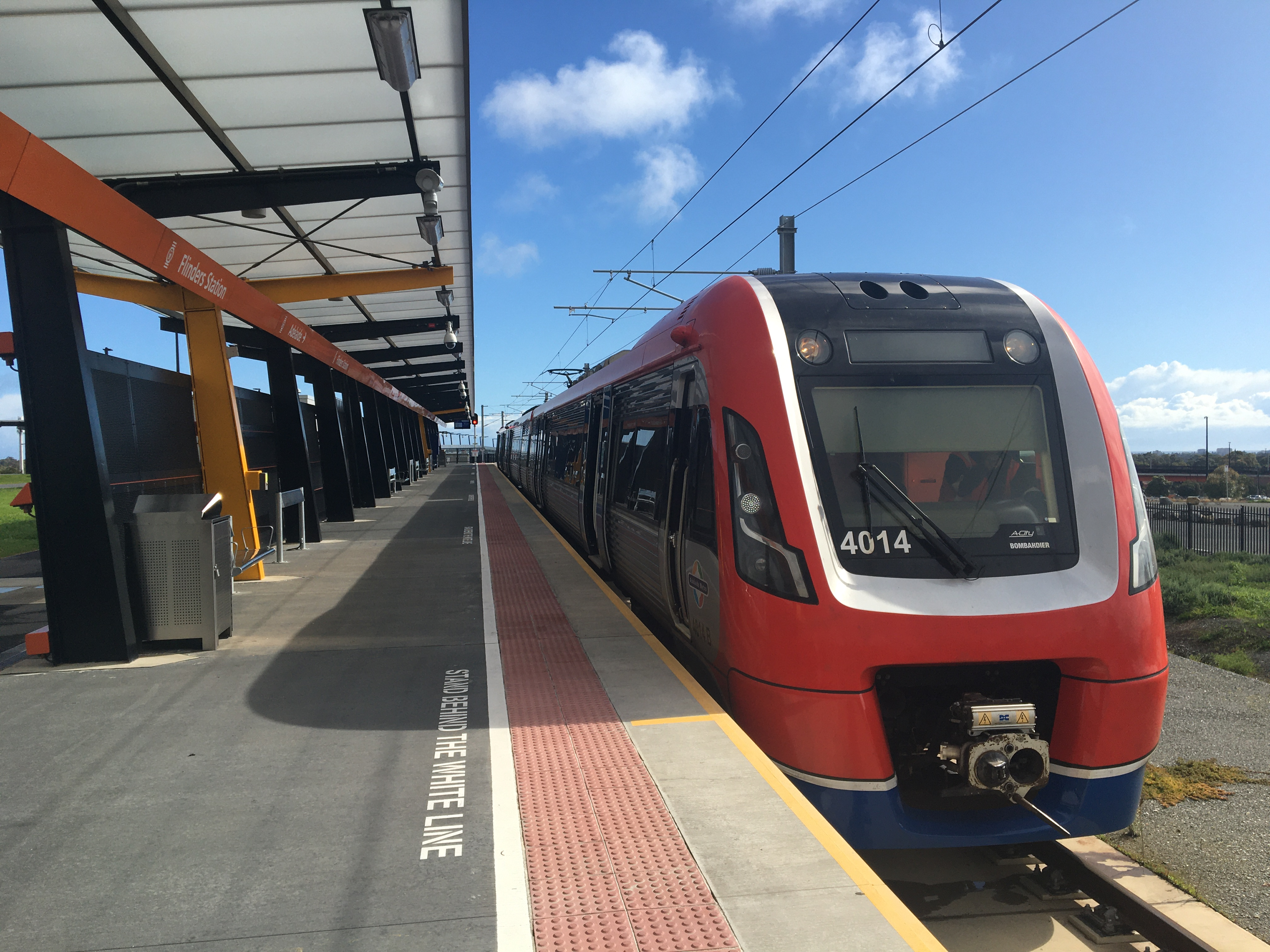

General information
- Location: Service Road, Bedford Park
- Coordinates: 35°01′09″S 138°34′08″E
- Owner: Department for Infrastructure & Transport
- Operator: Adelaide Metro
- Line: Flinders
- Distance: 13.65 km from Adelaide
- Platforms: 1
- Tracks: 1
- Bus routes: 101, 200, 200B, 300, 300G, 300H, 300J, 320, 600, 600A, 600B, 601, 601A, 601B, 719, 720H, 721, 721F, 721R, 722, 722F, 723F, 780, 955, 961, 977, 981, G10, G20, G20F, G21, G21F
- Connections: Bus

Construction
- Structure type: Ground
- Parking: No
- Accessible: Yes

Other information
- Station code: 18933 (to City)
- Website: Adelaide Metro

History
- Opened: 29 December 2020

Services
Preceding station	Adelaide Metro	Following station
Tonsley towards Adelaide	Flinders line	Terminus
Location

Flinders railway station is the terminus of the Flinders line in the southern Adelaide suburb of Bedford Park. It serves the adjacent Flinders Medical Centre precinct and Flinders University.

== History ==
A rail extension to Flinders Medical Centre had been mooted in July 2008, with the State Government commissioning a feasibility study, but nothing eventuated. In May 2016, as part of the Liberal Party's campaign for the federal election later that year, $43 million in funding was promised towards extending the Tonsley line. The extension, known as the Flinders Link Project, was built concurrently with the adjacent Darlington Upgrade on the Southern Expressway and is located to the east of the expressway and local service roads; a rail overpass and pedestrian bridge connects the existing rail corridor and the new station. Major works commenced in July 2019 and the extension opened on 29 December 2020.

The completed station is accessible from the Flinders Medical Centre and Flinders Private Hospital, and is within walking distance of the bus interchange adjacent to Flinders Medical Centre. Transport links to Flinders University are also available within walking distance. Flinders University is also planning to develop the station precinct into Flinders Village, a development containing student accommodation, a health research centre, shops and a hotel.

== Platforms and services ==
Flinders has one side platform and is serviced by Adelaide Metro. Trains are scheduled every 30 minutes, with additional services in the morning and evening peak on weekdays.

Platform	Destination
1	Adelaide
