= Marino, South Australia =

Marino
- Suburb
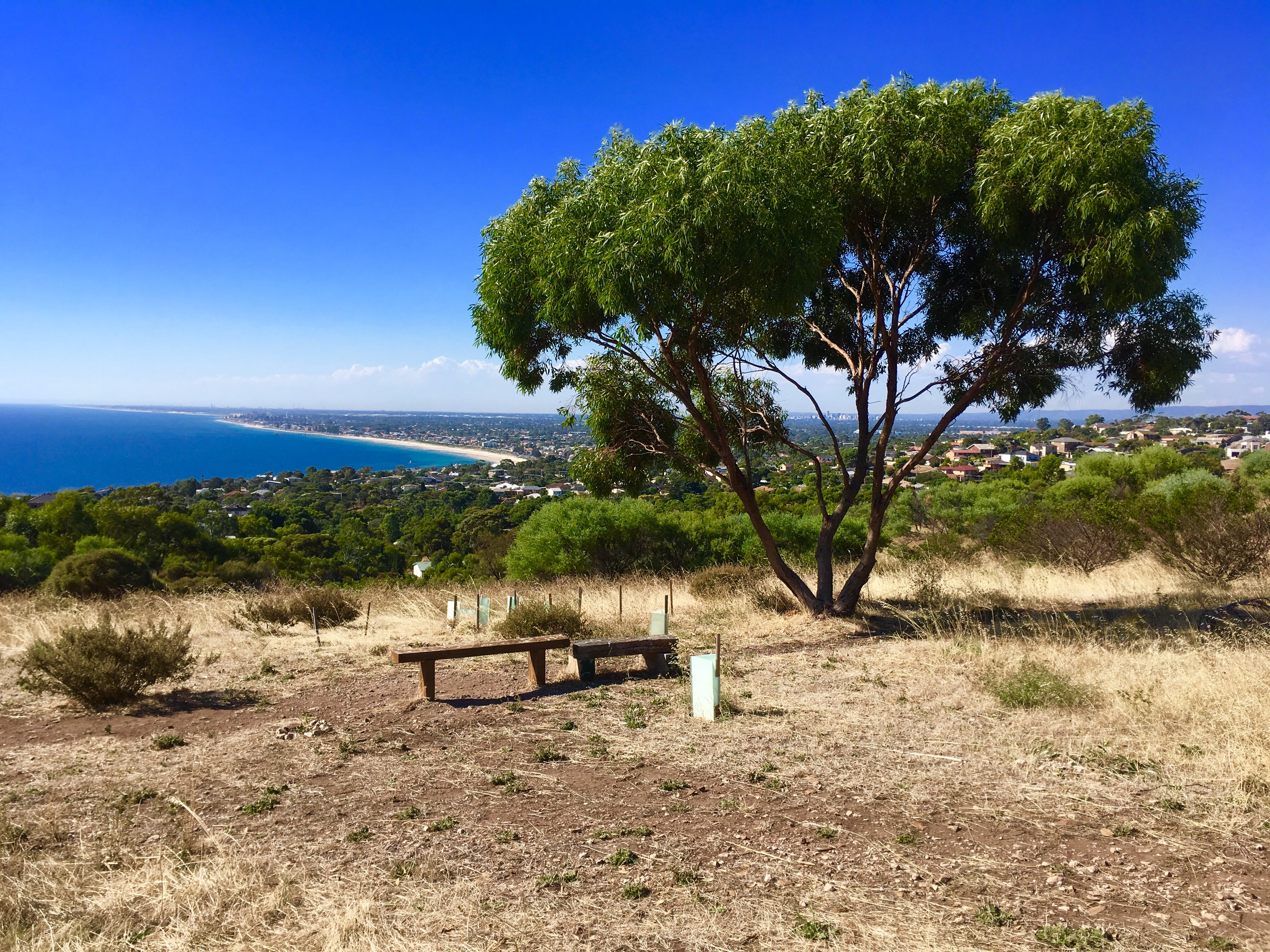

- Coordinates: 35.064°S 138.518°E
- Country: Australia
- State: South Australia
- City: Adelaide
- LGA: City of Marion

Government
  - State electorate: Black
  - Federal division: Boothby

Population
  - Total: 2,277 (SAL 2021)
- Postcode: 5049
Suburbs around Marino
	Kingston Park	Seacliff
Gulf St Vincent	Marino	Seacliff Park
	Hallett Cove	Trott Park

Marino is a coastal suburb in the south of Adelaide, South Australia that's surrounded by a conservation park and rugged coastline. Most houses have sea views and access to meandering public open spaces. The suburb even has its own working lighthouse. Marino's elevated position provides panoramic views of the ocean – Gulf St Vincent, the metropolitan beaches and Adelaide CBD. Marino has access to the North or South via Brighton Road, has two railway stations on the main Seaford Line and a host of walking and cycle trails to the neighbouring beaches and wine region.

Marino is directly 13 km south west of Adelaide CBD, 3 km south west of South Australia's largest shopping complex Westfield Marion and 14 km north west of the McLaren Vale wine region.

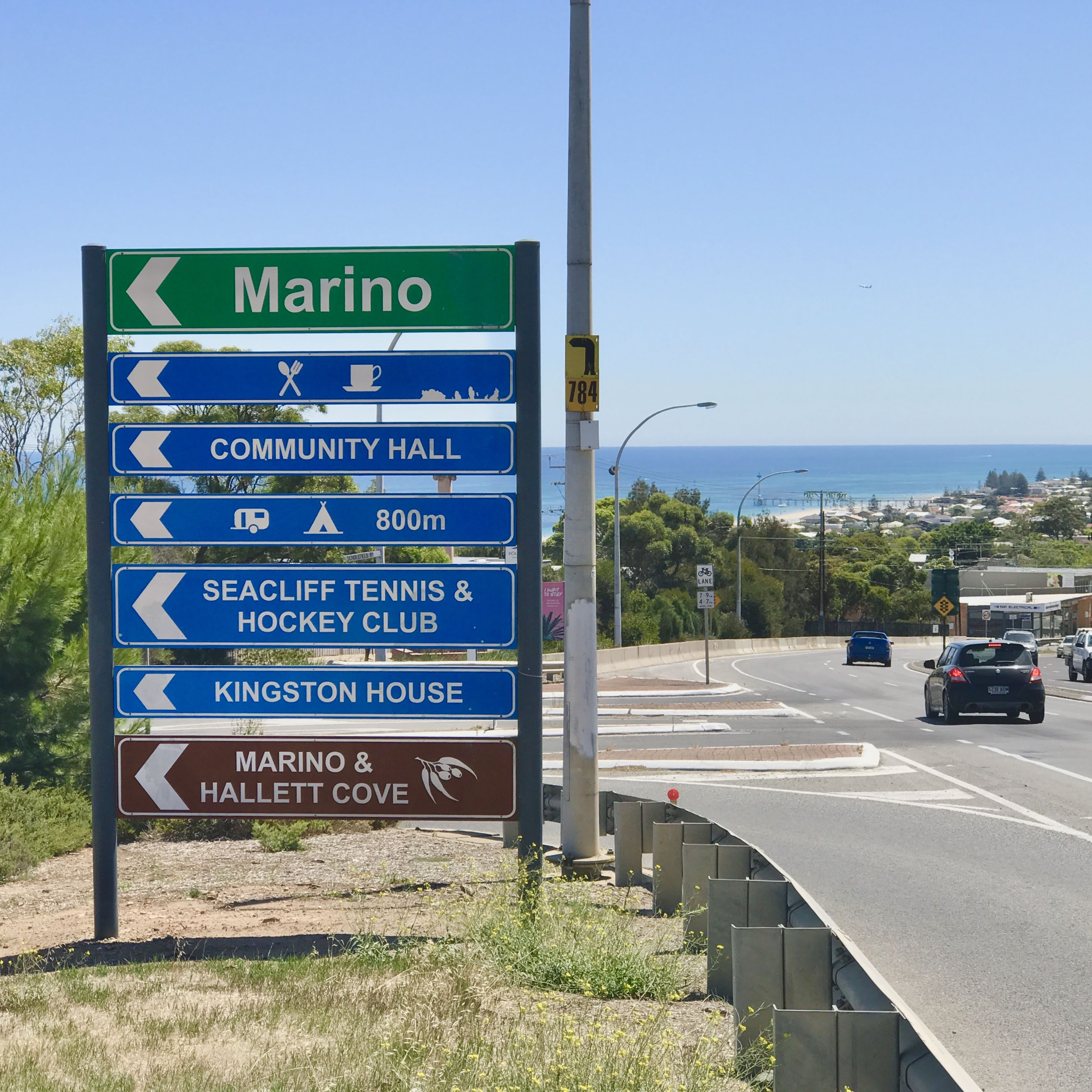
Signage showing all of the things on offer around Marino.

The suburb is home to Marino Rocks beach, which sits below the cliff tops and features a flat rocky beach leading out to a reef on the southern end of Kingston Park/Seacliff. Fishing, kayaking, sailing and snorkelling are common recreation activities.

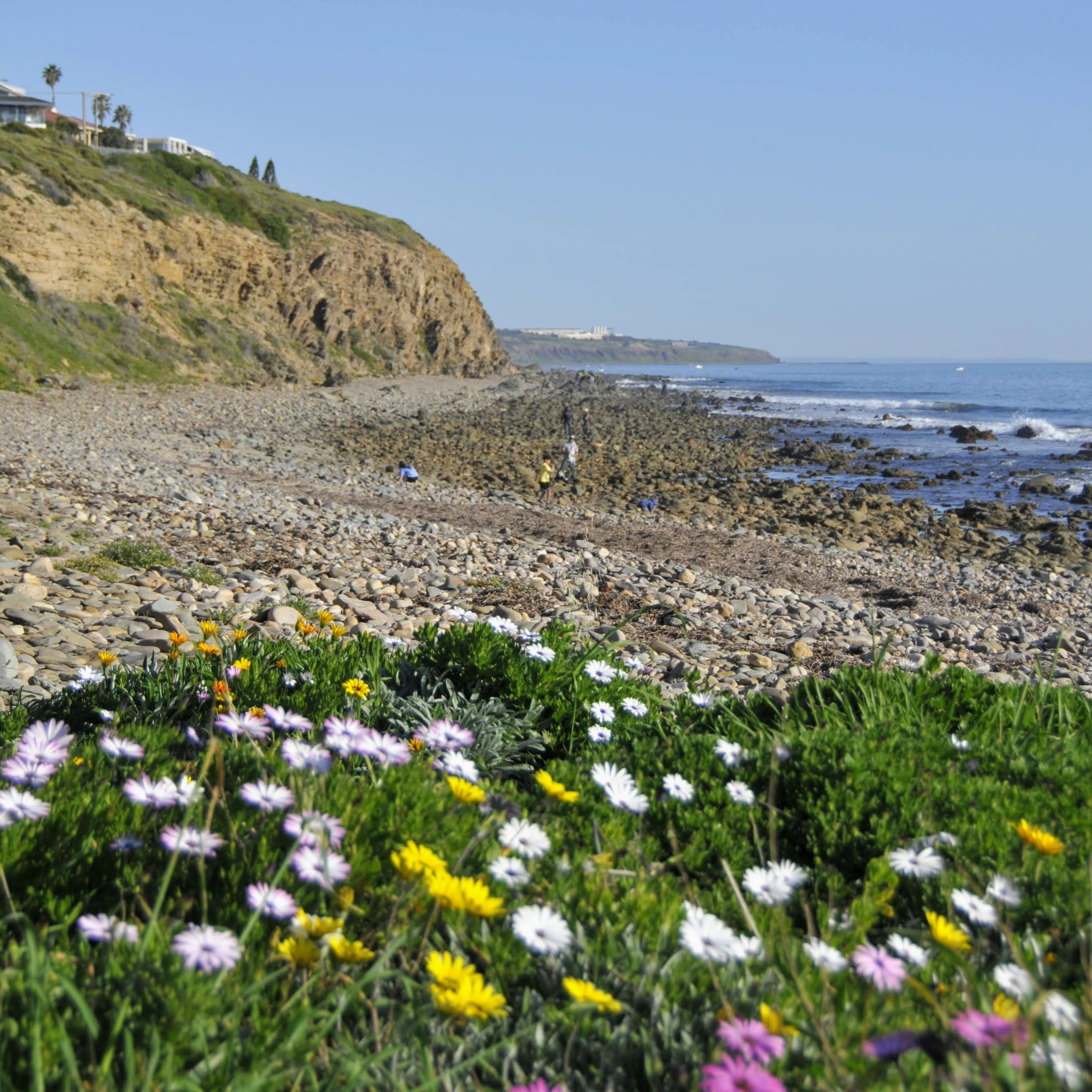
Families explore Marino Rocks beach.

Many people also use this section of the coastline to exercise while enjoying the views from the trails that run along the Marino cliff tops.

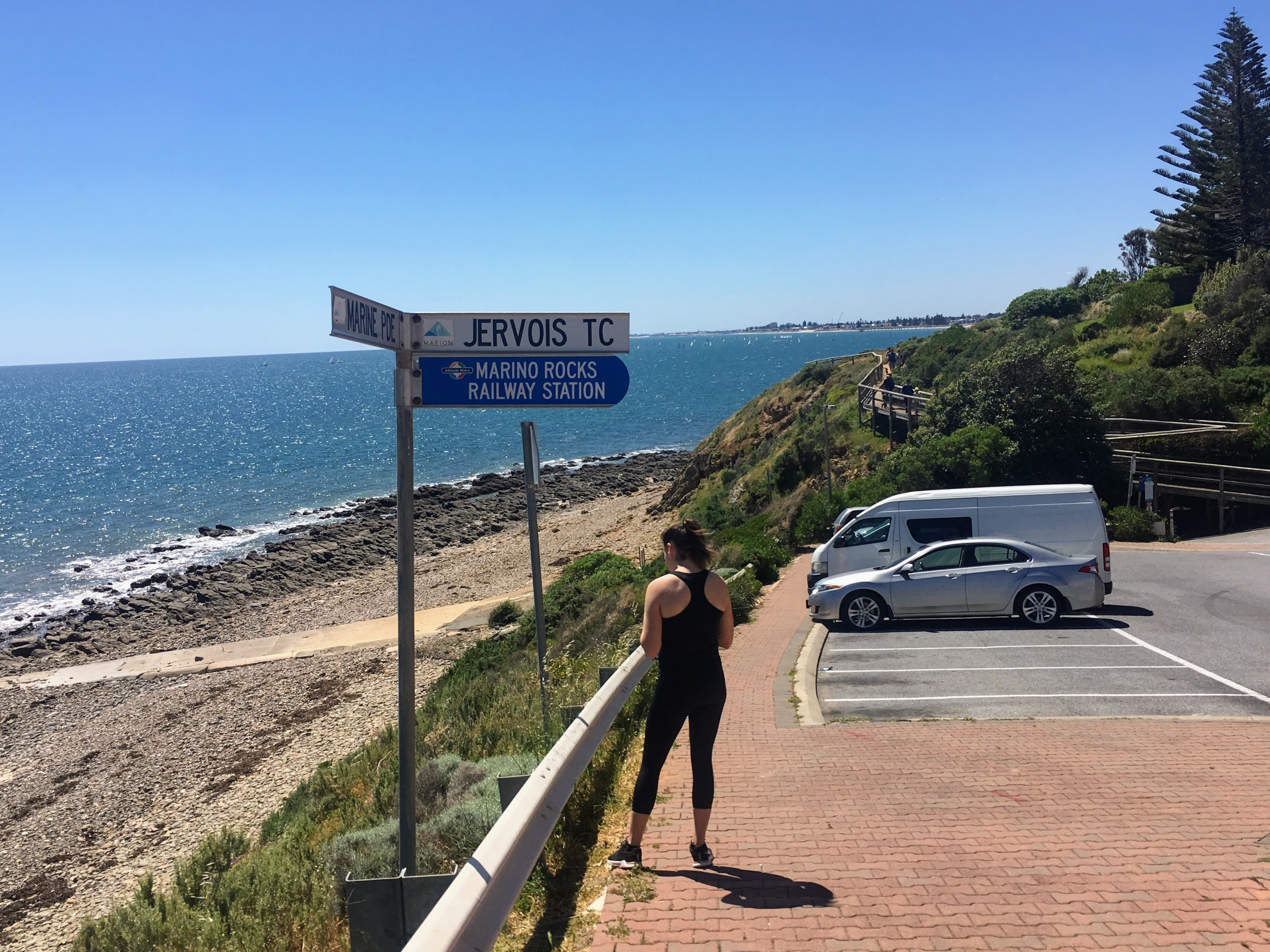
The coastline at Marino Rocks includes a beach with boat ramp, car parking and several walking trails.

At the northern end of the beach, the public artwork Contemplation can be viewed, by artist Marijana Tadic. Launched in 2006, the artwork takes the form of a rocked boat.

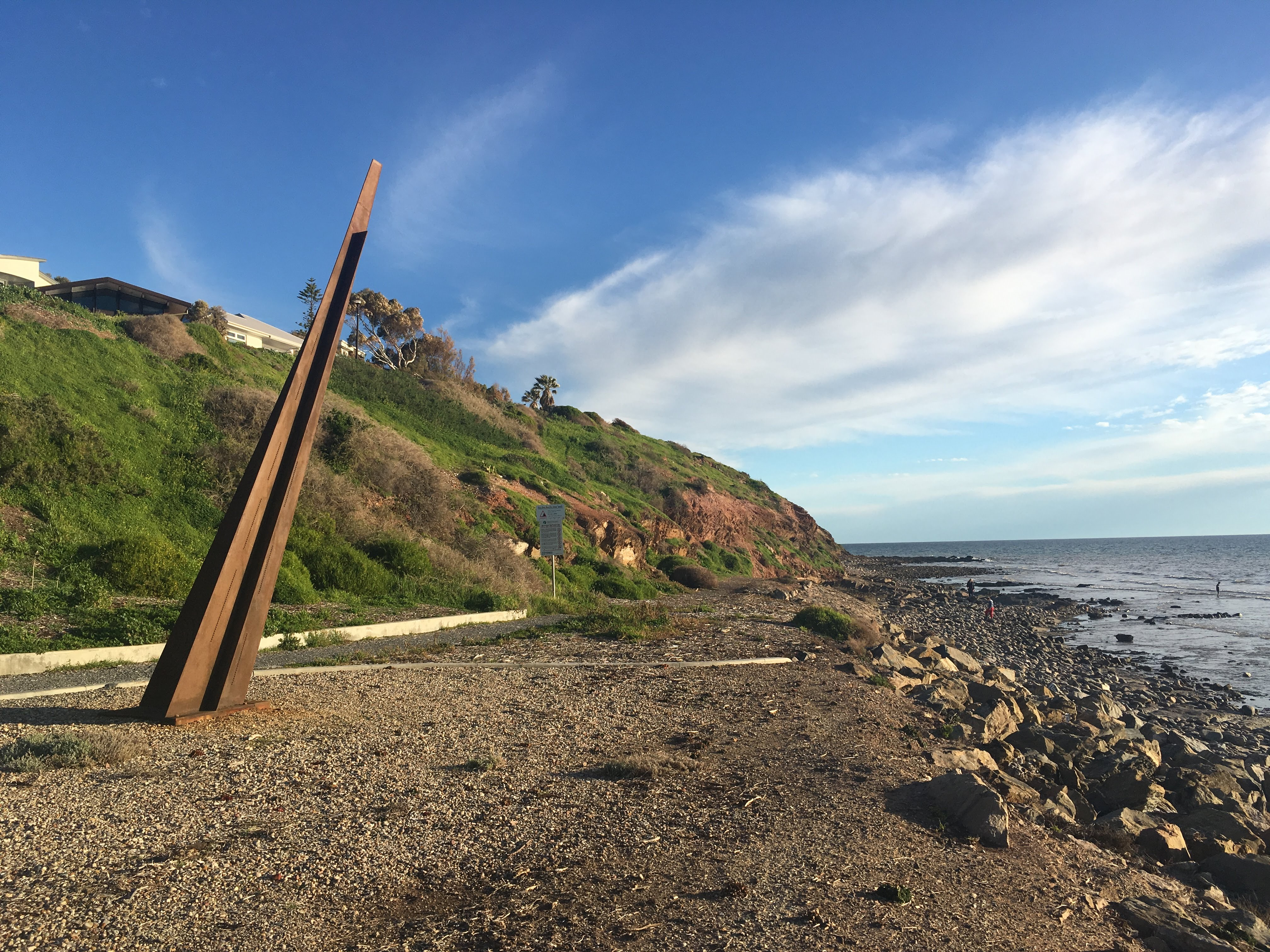
The Contemplation artwork sits right on the shoreline of Marino Rocks beach.

The artwork looks out over the ocean and marks the change from the rocky shoreline at Marino Rocks to the sandy beaches of neighbouring Seacliff.

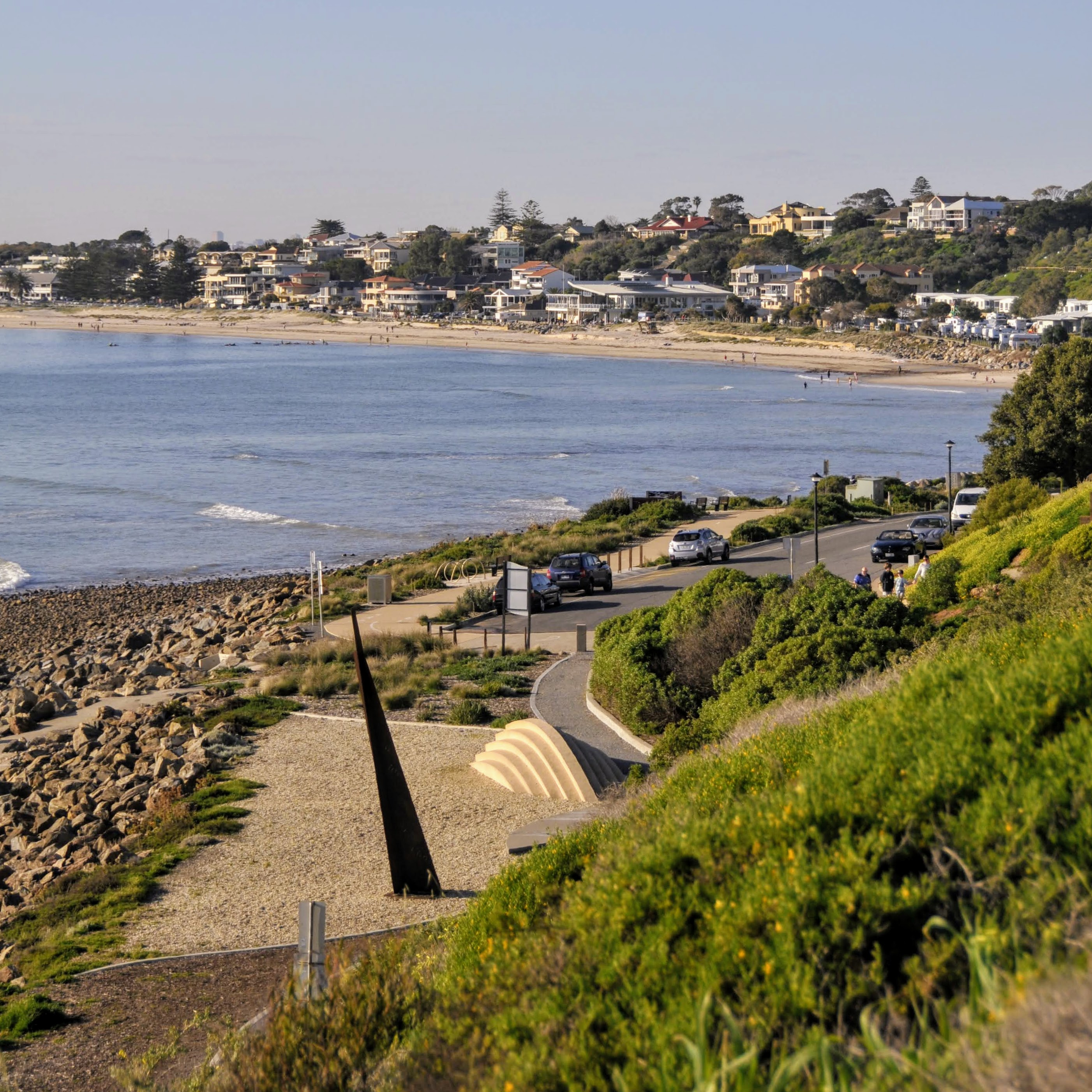
The Contemplation Artwork sits at one end of Marino Rocks beach looking towards the rest of Holdfast Bay.

Also as of 2006, at the access point to the beach, there is a mosaic artwork designed and constructed by South Australian artist Michael Tye. Michael worked with local artists and community members in the design and construction of the mosaic artwork along the nearby retaining wall.

The main Seaford railway line into Adelaide CBD passes through the suburb, and there are two railway stations: Marino, and the newly improved Marino Rocks that is looked after by community volunteers as part of the Government's Rail Care scheme. In 2020 Marino Rocks railway station benefited from new seats, community artwork, City of Marion way-finding signage to local attractions and extensive Government-funded landscaping. In 2025, the Government committed 2 million dollars to a safety upgrade to the Marino station.

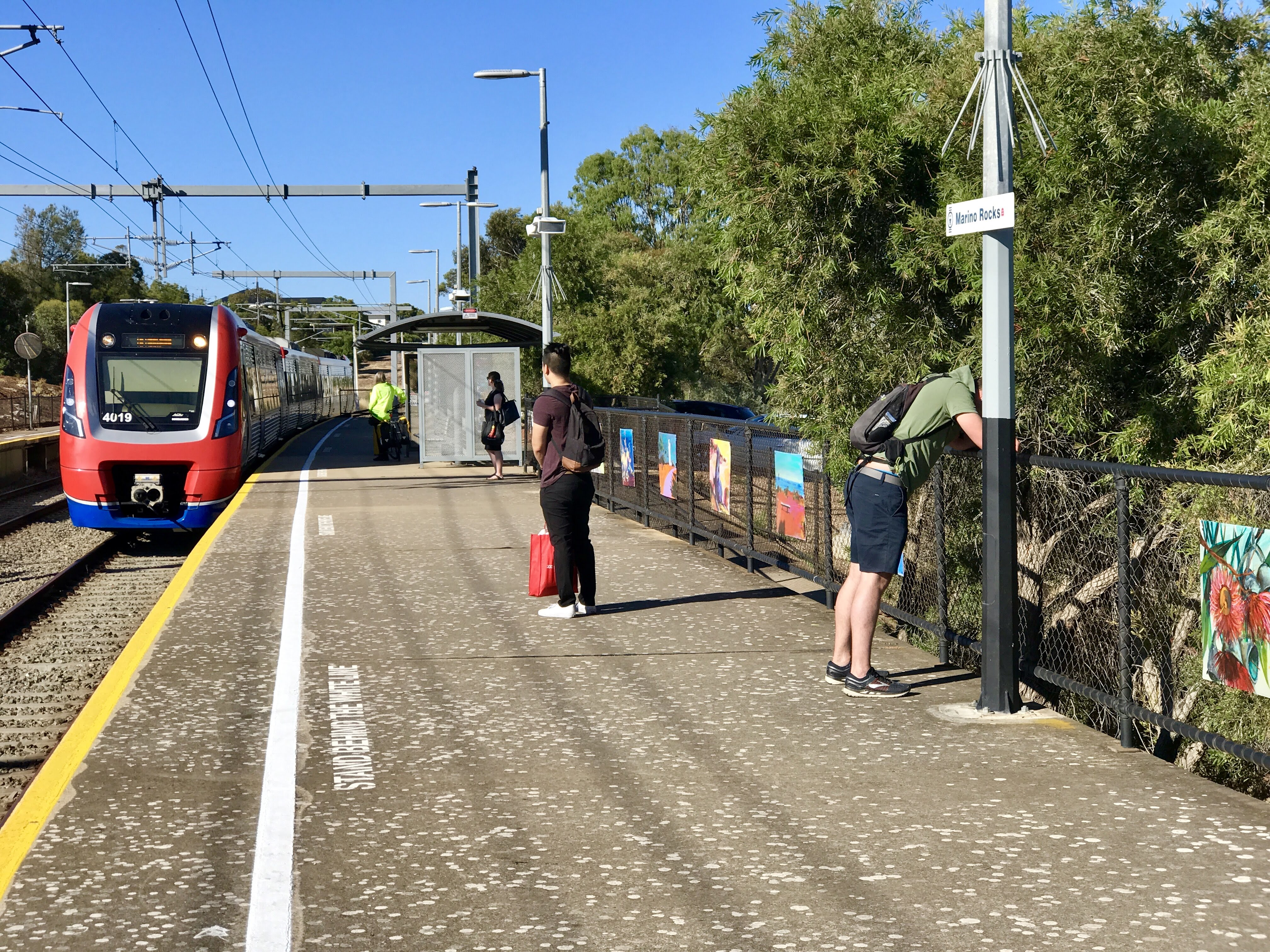
The upgraded Marino Rocks Railway station with artwork organised and created by the local community.

A number of walking trails are available throughout Marino, including the clifftop Marino to Hallett Cove Boardwalk and the Adelaide Coast Park that has an uninterrupted path along all of Adelaide's metropolitan beaches and beyond.

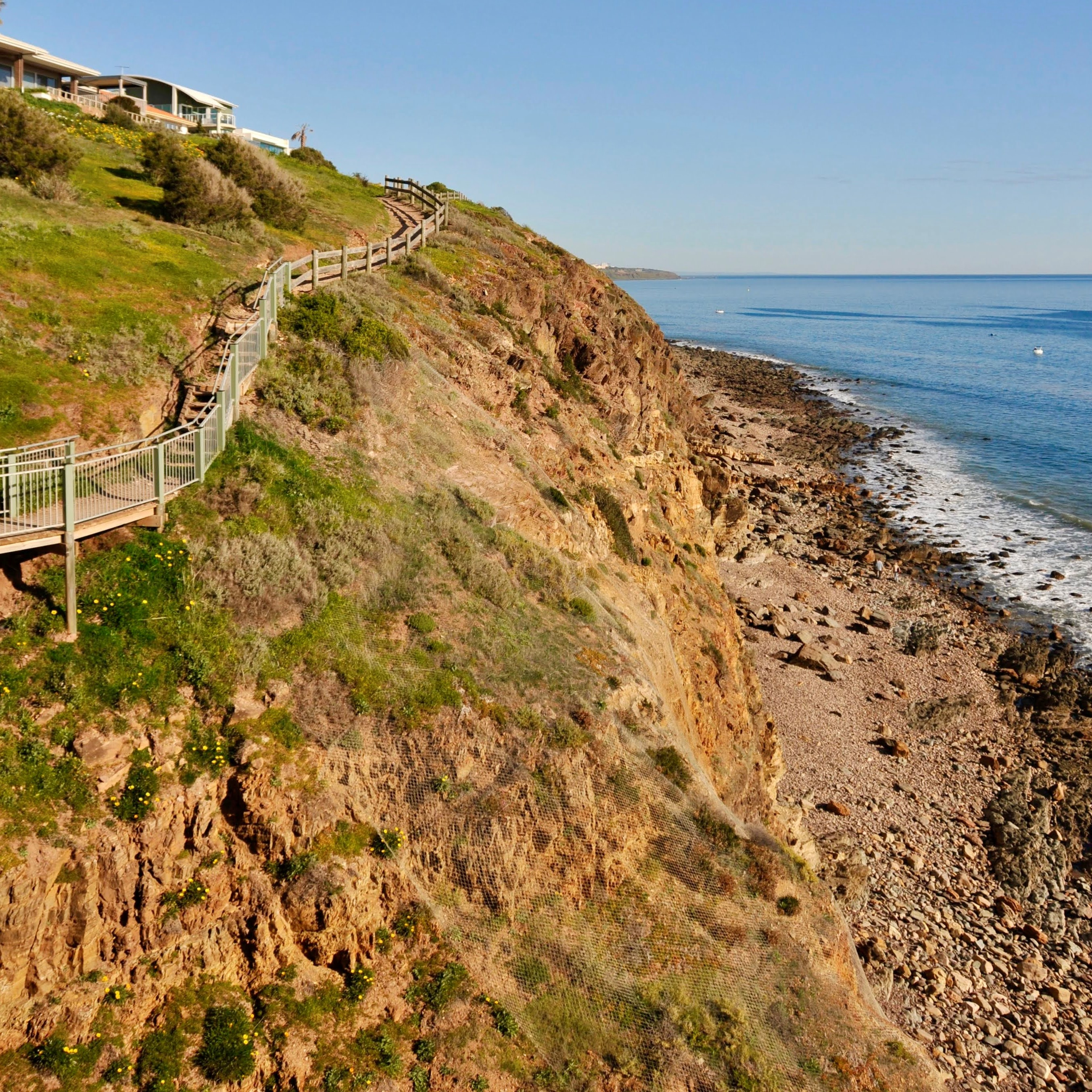
The Marino to Hallett Cove Boardwalk offers a spectacular walking trail right along the edge of the clifftops.

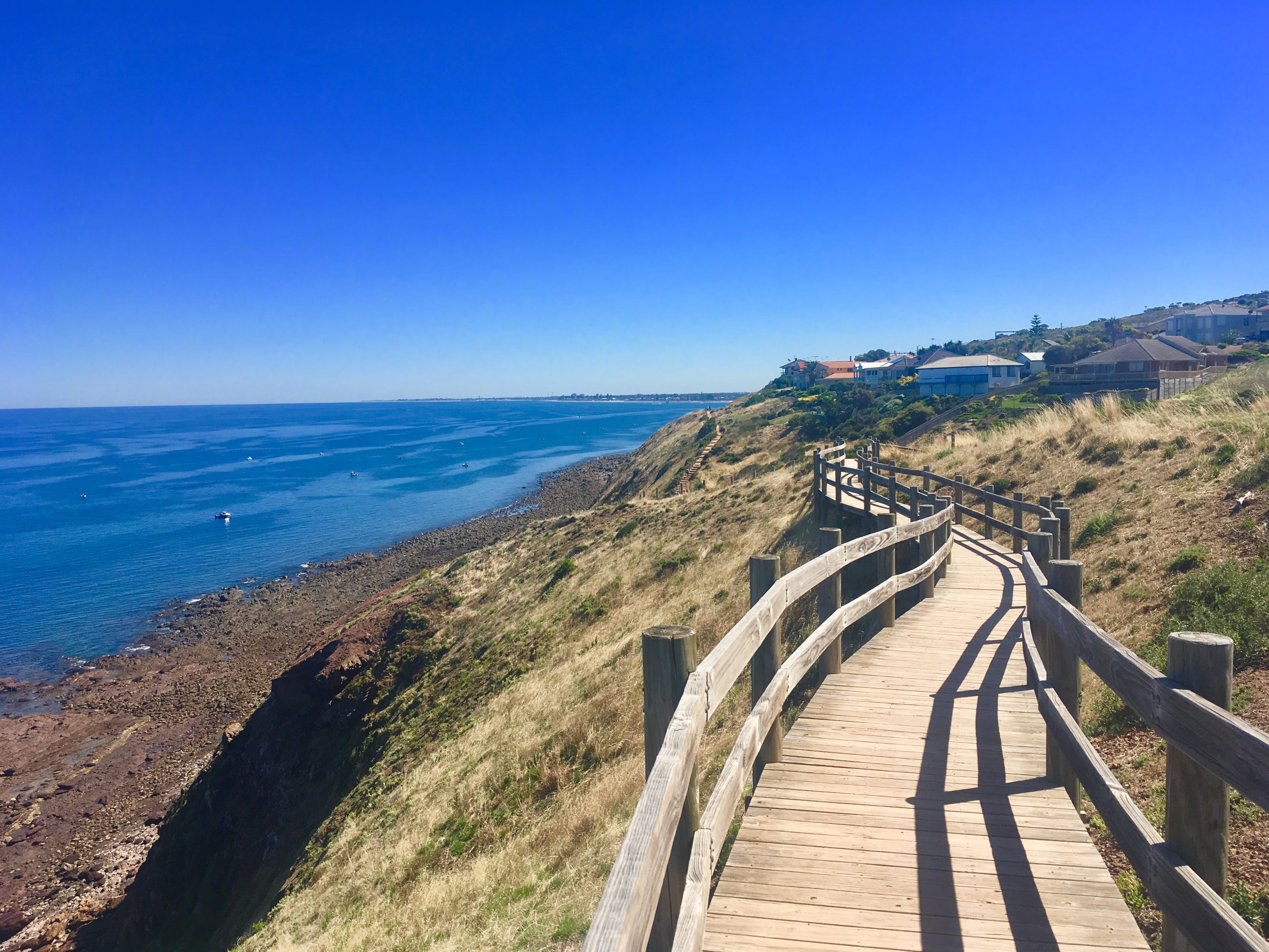
The famous Marino to Hallett Cove Boardwalk looking towards Marino and Adelaide's metropolitan beaches.

Bikeways include the Marino Rocks Greenway all the way into Adelaide CBD, the Coast to Vines rail trail that runs through to the beautiful McLaren Vale wine region and a signposted route to the nearby cafes and bars in Seacliff, Brighton and Glenelg.

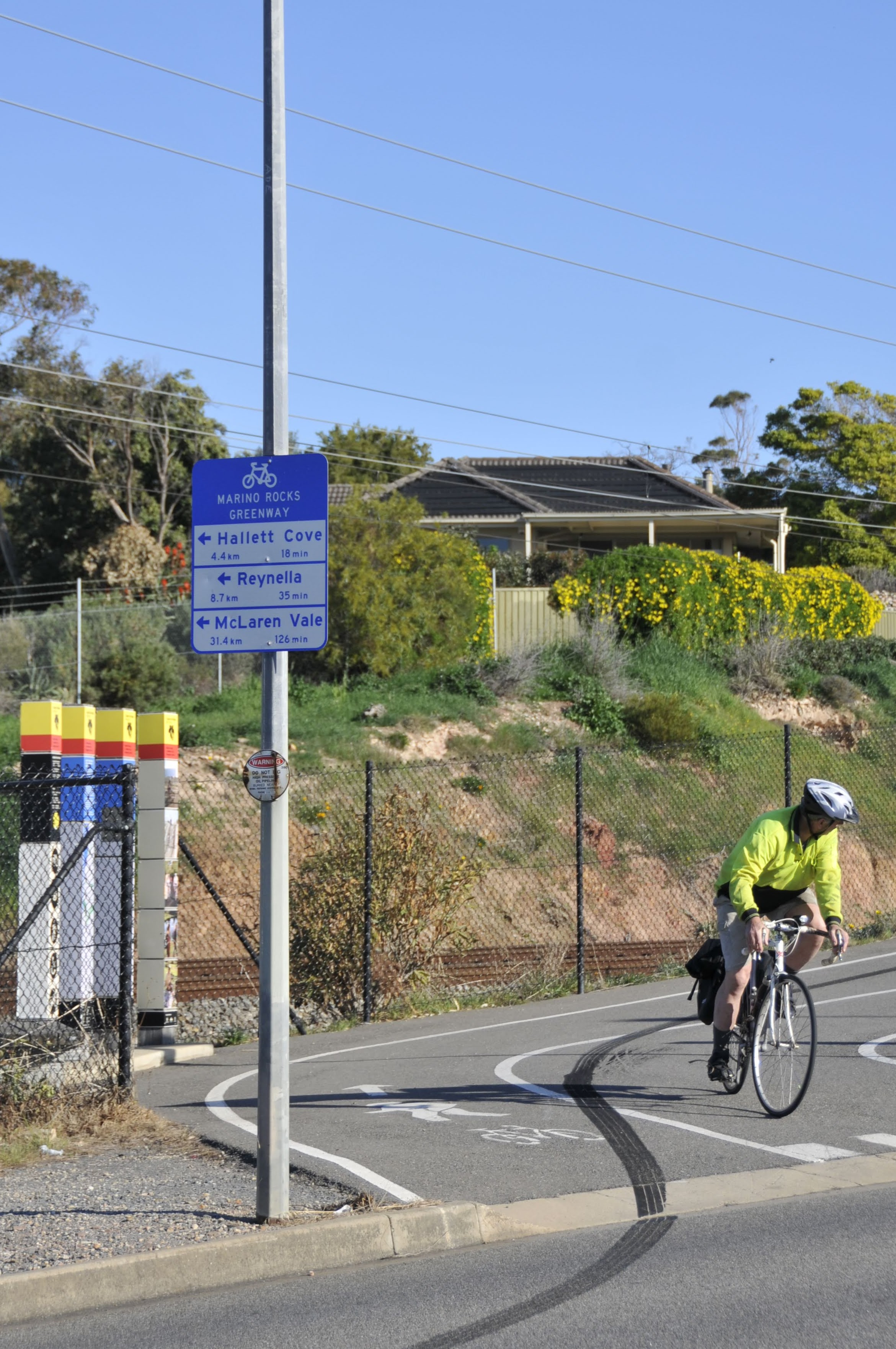
The start of the Coast to Vines Rail Trail at Marino Rocks, Adelaide.

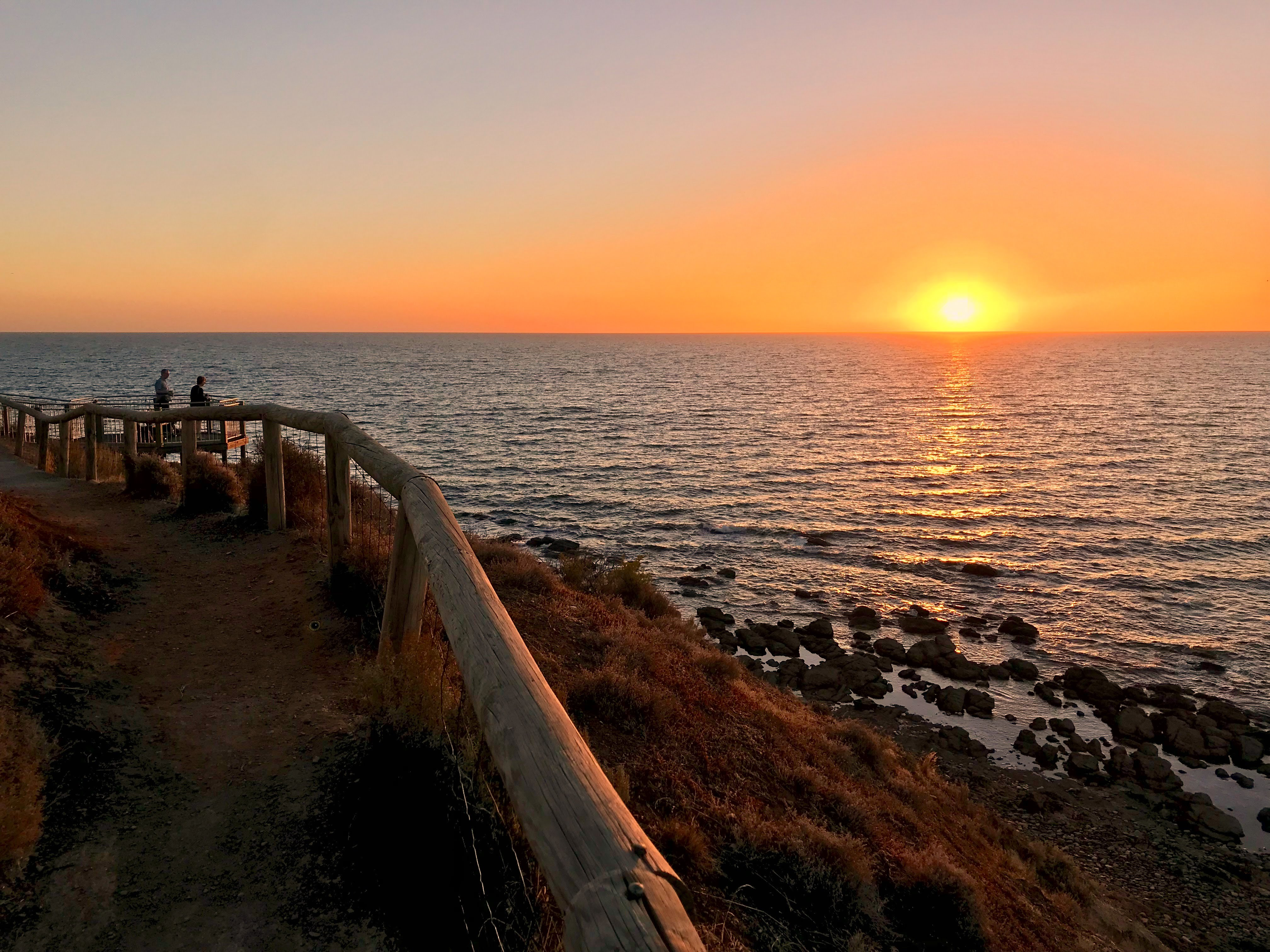
The sun sets right over the ocean at Marino Rocks beach.

Marino is home to the Marino Rocks Lighthouse within the Marino Conservation Park, now part of the newly created Glenthorne National Park–Ityamaiitpinna Yarta.

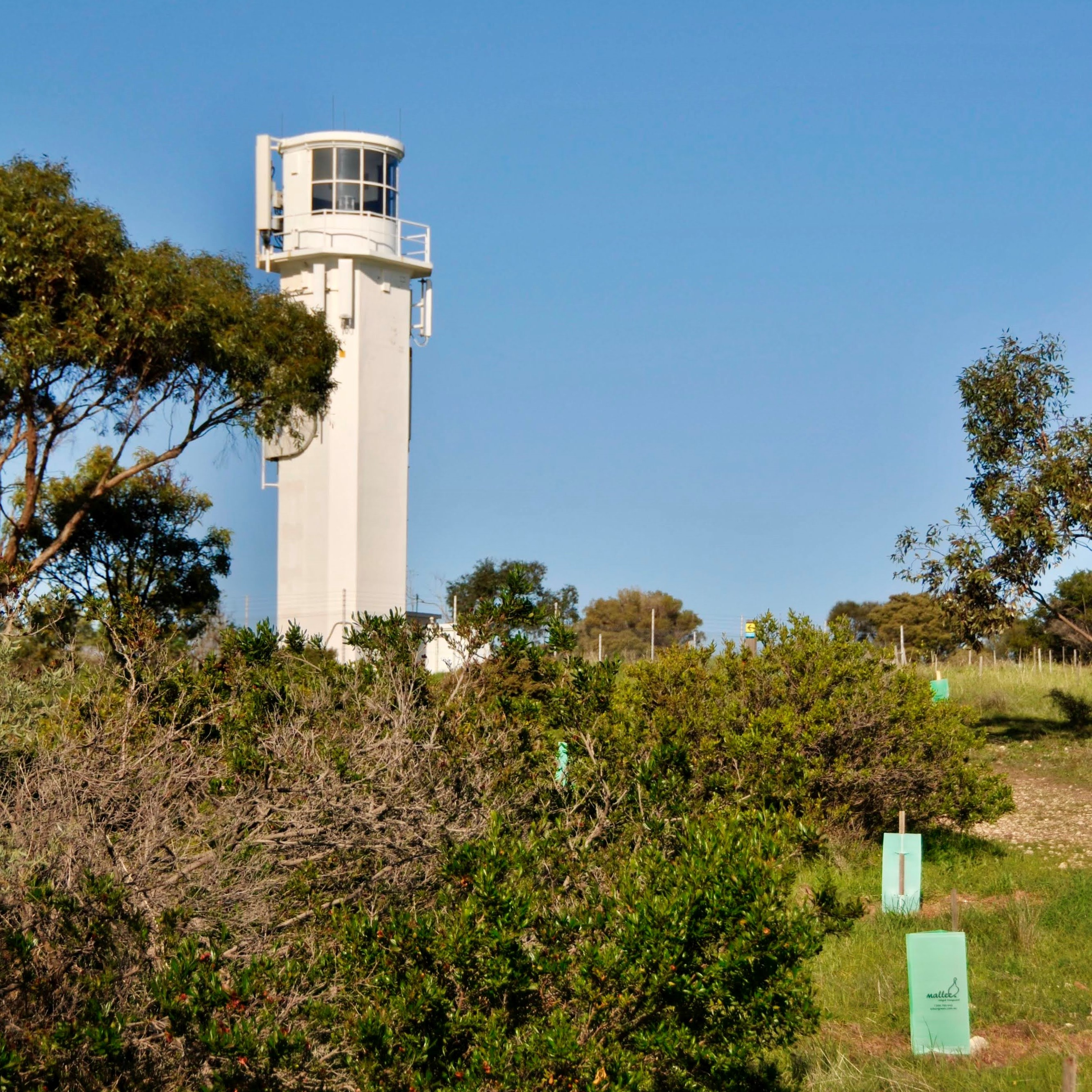
At the end of a walking trail within the beautiful Marino Conservation Park sits Marino Rocks lighthouse.

Guided walking trails lead up to the lighthouse within the conservation park.

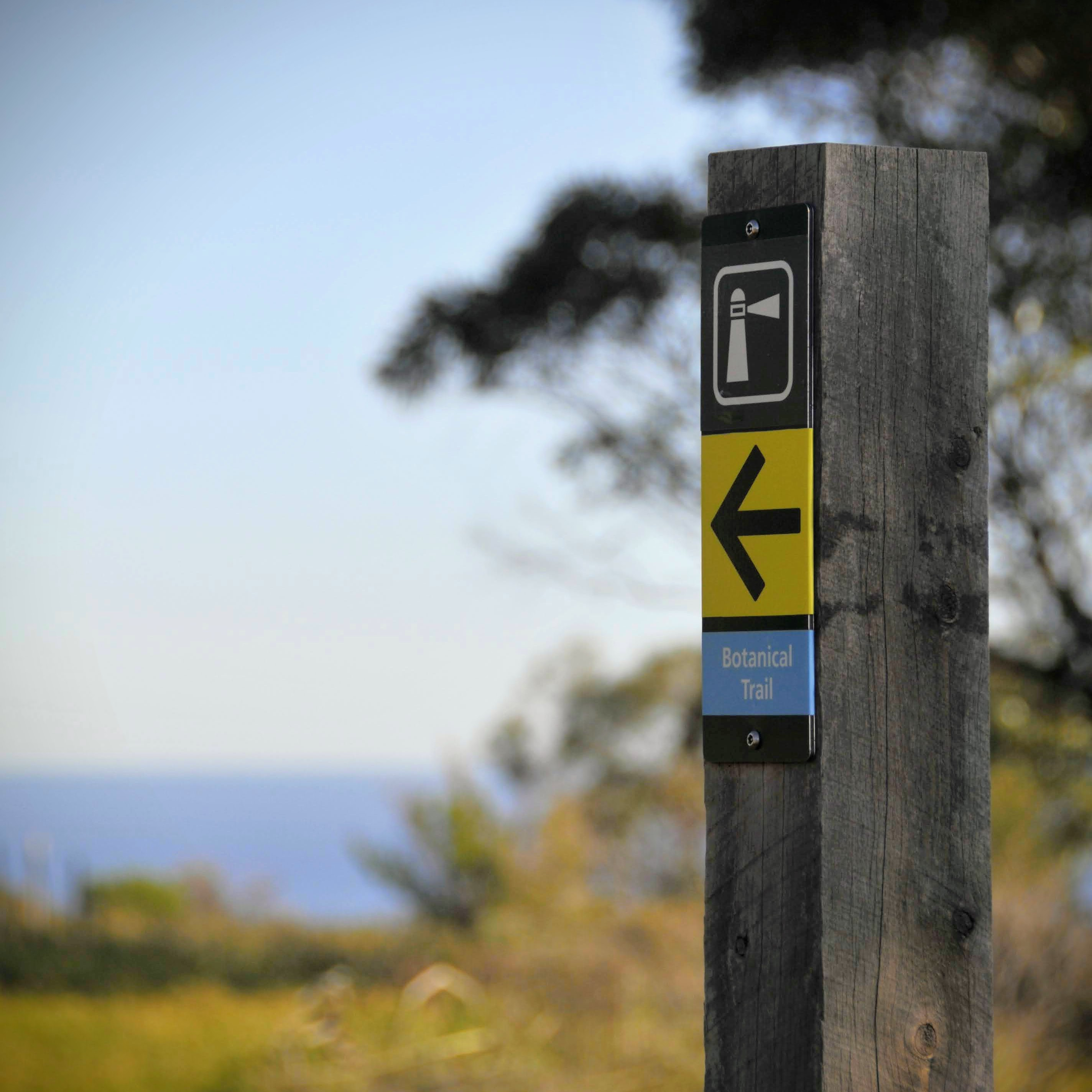
Botanical Trail signs to the lighthouse within Marino Conservation Park.

Community ties in Marino are strong with an active 5049 Coastal Community Residents Association, the Marino Community Garden, several parks that often host neighbourhood get-togethers.

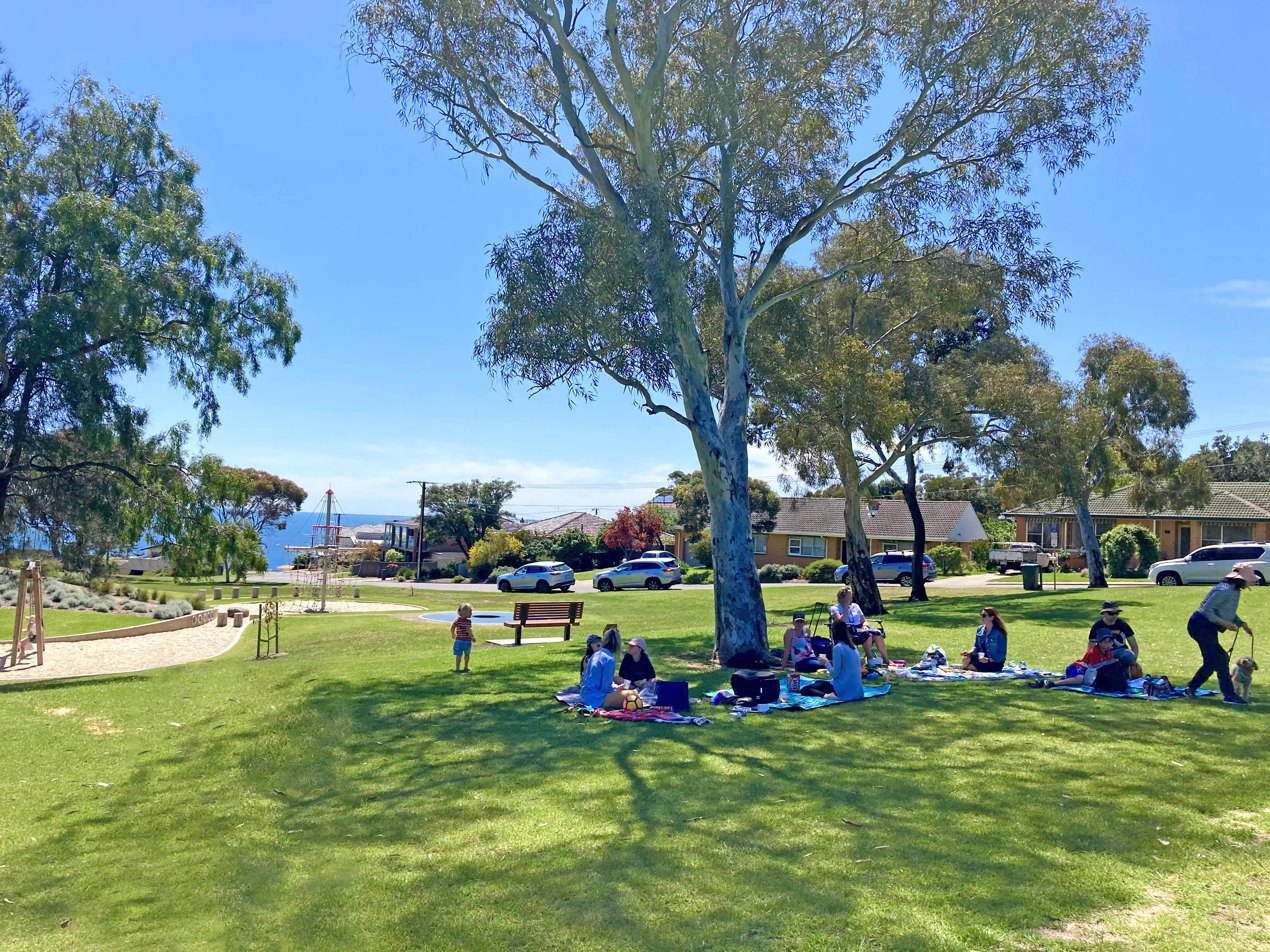
Local families gather within the upgraded Bandon Terrace Reserve, Marino.

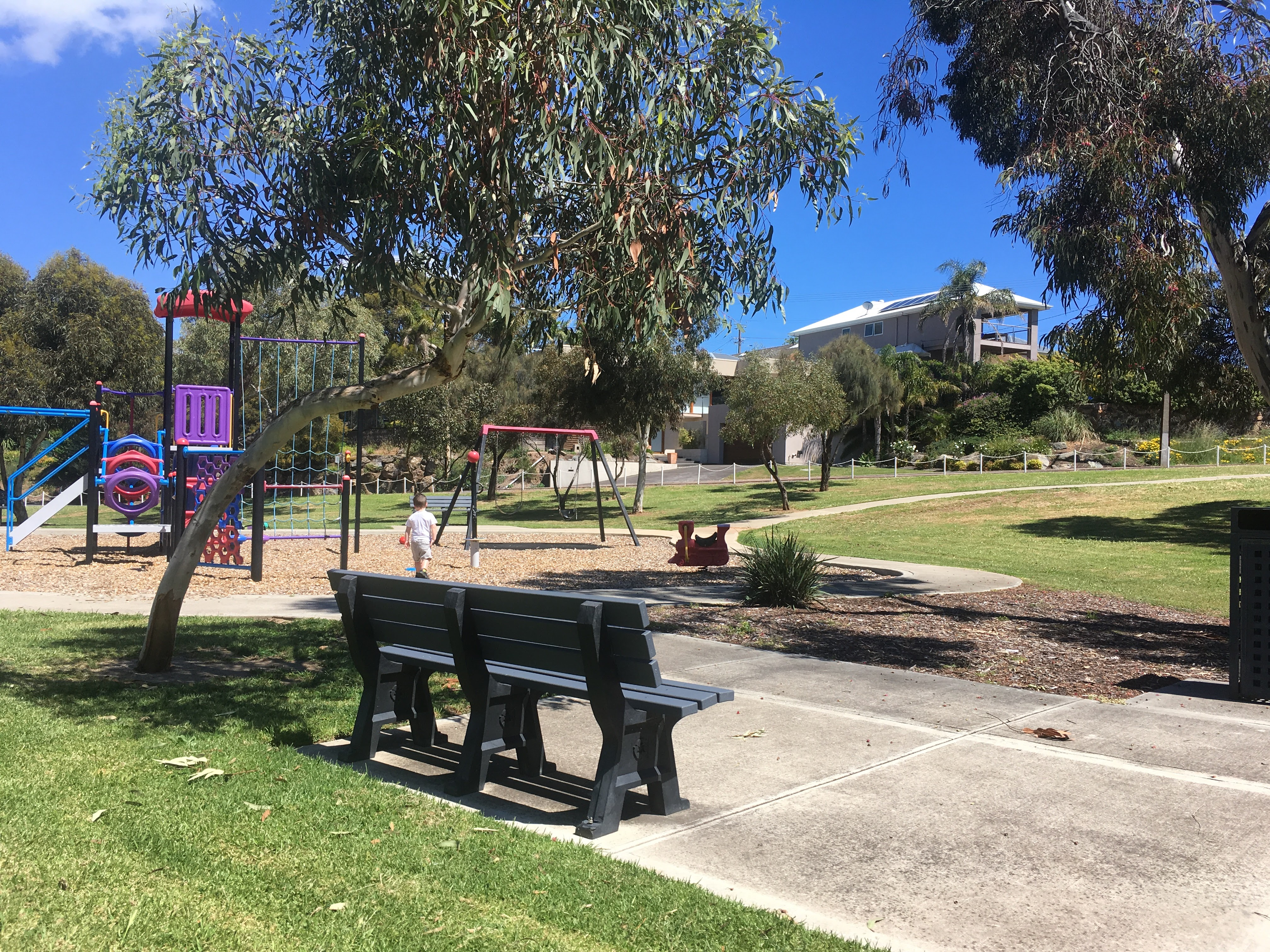
The park within Nimboya Road Reserve in Marino.

== History ==
A team, under the leadership of J.W. McLaren, completed the survey of the coastal strip of Brighton in December 1838. Land grants for sections 206 (now Somerton) and 234 – 246 (now Brighton – Marino) were allotted in March and April 1839. Section 244 was known as Marino, and granted to George S. Kingston who built what is now one of the oldest buildings in South Australia as his occasional residence.

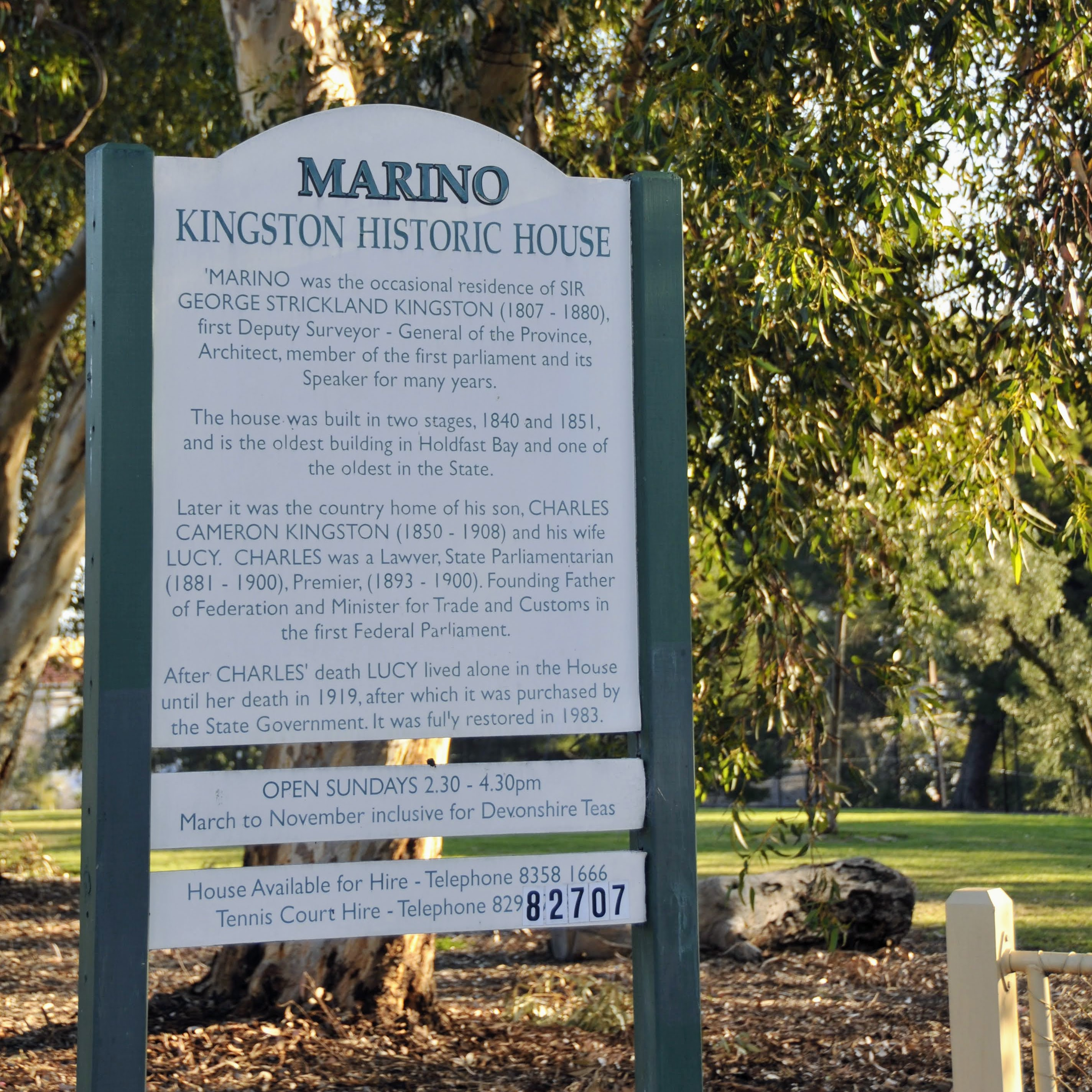
Marino - Kingston Historic House is one of the oldest in South Australia

This is now mostly Kingston Park. Sections 245 and 246 were originally known as the New Brighton Country Lands and were granted to Matthew Smith.

Smith divided the New Brighton Country Lands into 40 blocks of 4 acres (16,000 m^{2}) each. It was considered poor pastoral land, due to the exposed salt air and strong winds. By August 1842, Smith had sold only 15 blocks, mainly to notable business people who had little intention of living in the New Brighton Country Lands, but bought properties as a speculative proposition for future sales to fishing families or workers in the nearby quarry. Henry Hickling purchased 6 blocks. In 1884 John Roberts bought some of the remaining unsold blocks and 20 or so years later sold this land to George S. Kingston.

Local government in the area was formed in 1853, the 18th District Council constituted in South Australia. Its name was the District Council of Brighton (as distinct from the Corporation of Brighton which formed some 5 years later, mainly as a result of the determination of local residents to improve roads in the area). The first chairman of this new district was Thomas O'Halloran. The first meetings were held in the Thatched House Tavern, which, if still standing, would be on the corner of Brighton and Sturt roads. According to the 1876 Census, the District Council of Brighton totalled 328 schoolchildren of which 192 were able to read and write. In 1886 the council, less the now small coastal Corporation of Brighton, was renamed the District Council of Marion.

In 1875, a proposal was put forward to build an outer harbour at Marino. The proposal was furthered in 1880 in a report by Captain H.S. Stanley, R.N. In 1901 a Marino Outer Harbour League was formed. However the construction of the Outer Harbour near Port Adelaide, in 1908, finally laid these plans to rest.

In 1883, the Glenelg, Brighton and Marino Tramway Company began a horse-drawn tram service. The tram made its last run along Brighton Road to Glenelg in February 1914.

The shore from Holdfast Bay to Marino, was generally well visited by townspeople, who would take the hours ride from Adelaide to enjoy the beach and fresh sea breeze. Sundays in particular were popular, especially in fine weather. In Easter, holiday-makers could buy cool drinks, hot water and fruit from a tent set up on the beach, the proprietor paying a guinea fee to the council to conduct business. In the 1920s an old railway carriage found its way onto the foreshore of Marino Rocks, still a popular holiday destination. In the 1930s, reports from council stated no renovations or building of shacks should disturb the Sunday peace of Marino residents.

Marino, also known as Folkestone for a while, was further subdivided in 1912, along with Morphettville Park, Woodlands Park and Hallett Cove Model Estate.

The suburb now has a mix of old and new property, often on large blocks and with panoramic views.

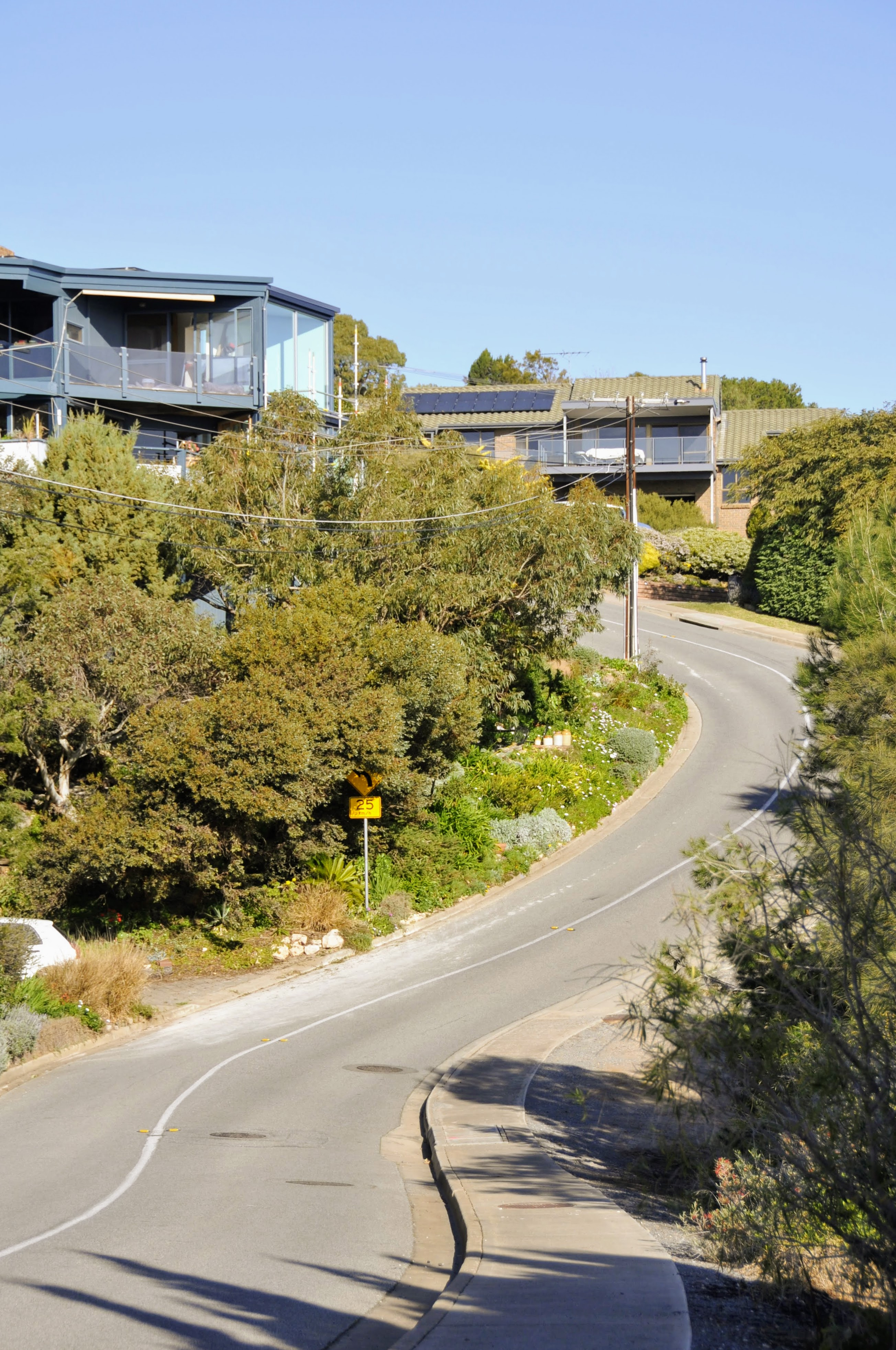
Homes in Marino often sit on steep winding streets, with spectacular views of the city, local conservation park and ocean.

== Industry ==
Early in the history of European settlement of South Australia, limestone, sand, quartzite and gypsum have been quarried in the Marino area.

The South Australian Company quarried building and paving stone. A pier was built at Marino Rocks beach in 1840 to transport this stone to building sites in Port Adelaide and Adelaide. The ridges of the pier, extending out to a marker buoy, are still visible today, at low tide.

In 1882, a limestone quarry supported the first cement manufactured in South Australia by Brighton Hydraulic Cement Works, competing with Portland cement, which was imported in great quantities. Horses played a significant part in the Brighton Cement Works especially on the steep and difficult climb from Marino to the quarries further south, on what was then, and still is, known as Cement Hill. The Brighton Cement works moved to Angaston in the 1950s. Brighton Cement merged with Adelaide Cement to become Adelaide Brighton Cement in first months of 1971.

Linwood Quarries bought into the area in 1933 and further expanded into the previous Brighton Cement Works when they moved out in 1952. In 1973, rehabilitation of the site was being discussed and in 1979 the Marion Golf Park was opened on former quarry land. The cost of the rehabilitation was shared between Quarry Industries, City of Marion and various state and federal government departments. The project marked the first council to avail themselves of funds available through the Extractive Areas Rehabilitation Fund, a 10% state government levy on each ton of extractive minerals sold.

Boral have been operating a small asphalt plant, under a federal mining licence, in Marino, at the Lindwood Quarry since the 1980s.

== Walking and cycling trails ==
The 7.2 km coastal boardwalk starts at the Marino Esplanade and finishes at the Hallett Cove Headland Reserve. A part of the Adelaide Coast Park, the walk is unique in the metropolitan area with its rugged cliffs, small coves and rocky coast. The cliffs at Hallett Cove feature significant geological formations with evidence of glacial movements 600 million years ago. The coastline features prominently in the Tjilbruke legend of the Kaurna people. Coastal and marine interpretive signage has been installed along the coastal walking trail and consists of 33 large art signs in the shape of dolphins, fish, crabs and traditional Kaurna shields. Community artist, Barbary O'Brien worked with local schools, resident groups and members of the Kaurna Aboriginal community to develop the signs.

The 34 km Coast to Vines rail trail is a mostly sealed walking and cycling trail starting at Marino and travelling south through Adelaide's southern suburbs along the old railway line. It travels through the McLaren Vale wine region, finishing in the country town of Willunga.

A bike path along secondary roads is also available for cyclists to ride north from Marino to Glenelg, and even further to Semaphore and Outer Harbour.

== See also ==
- List of Adelaide suburbs
