= Michael Tye =

Michael Tye may refer to:

- Michael Tye (artist), Australian mosaic artist
- Michael Tye (philosopher), British philosopher
