= Marino Conservation Park =

Protected area in South Australia

- IUCN category III (natural monument or feature)
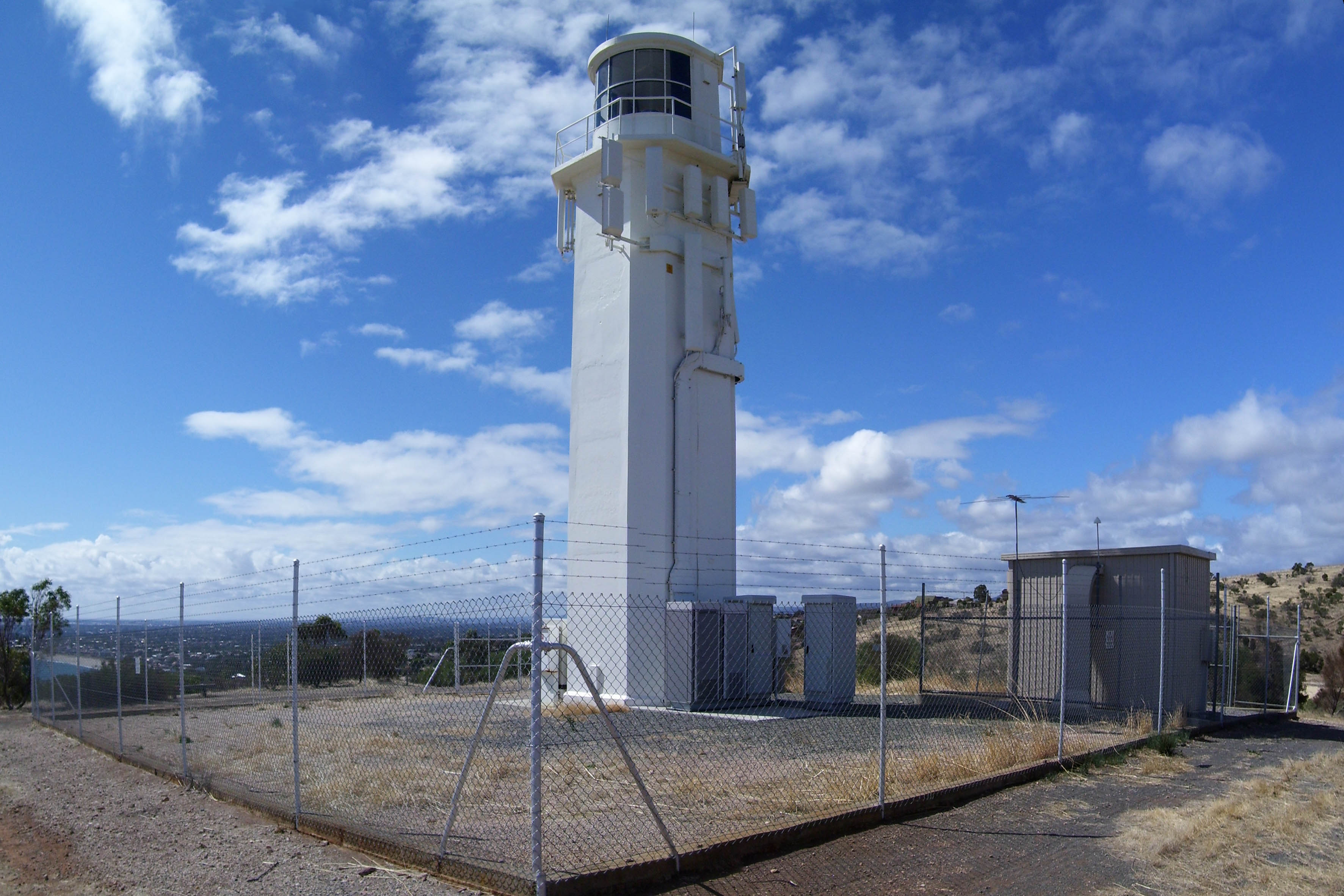
- Marino Lighthouse

- Location within South Australia
- Location: South Australia
- Nearest city: Marino
- Coordinates: 35°03′10″S 138°30′32″E
- Area: 30 ha (74 acres)
- Established: 2 November 1989
- Governing body: Department for Environment and Water
- Website: Official website

Marino Conservation Park is a protected area in the Australian state of South Australia located in the Adelaide suburb of Marino, overlooking both parts of the Adelaide metropolitan area and the coastline with Gulf St Vincent.

Situated on the lands of the Aboriginal Kaurna people, the Marino Conservation Park and surrounding areas are part of the Tjilbruke dreamtime.

Proclaimed in 1989 as a conservation park, it aims to protect flora such as the ground cover desert saw sedge (Gahnia lanigera) and twiggy daisy bush (Olearia ramulosa) and native grass species of genera such as Danthonia and Stipa, and groundcovers that dominate the central and eastern portions of the conservation park. The elegant wattle (Acacia victoriae) can also be seen in the conservation park.

The steep west-facing hillside above the railway line contains a very significant remnant area of coastal heath vegetation, including rare plants such as lemon beauty heads Calocephalus citreus, shiny ground berry (Acrotiche patula) and native apricot (Pittosporum phylliraecoides).

Past land-use practices and introduced exotic plants severely depleted the habitat available for native wildlife. Twenty-nine species of bird including owls, falcons, honeyeaters and rosellas frequent the conservation park. The eastern brown snake and insects also find sanctuary in the remnant vegetation and open space area.

It is accessible via the Marino Rocks railway station, which is nearby. A 1.5 km self-guided botanical trail starts from the car park with two gentle hills to climb. The trail from the car park to the Heath viewing area is suitable for wheelchairs. There are no picnic, toilet or other facilities in the conservation park. Camping is prohibited.

The conservation park has an active Friends of Parks group, mostly locals, who meet regularly on the first and third Thursdays and the last Sunday of each month.

The conservation park is classified as an IUCN Category III protected area.

After the creation of the Glenthorne National Park–Ityamaiitpinna Yarta in 2020, Marino Park Conservation Park became part of the Glenthorne Precinct, along with Hallett Cove Conservation Park, areas of the Field River valley and Happy Valley Reservoir.

== Marino Rocks Lighthouse ==
The Marino Rocks Lighthouse, or Marino Lighthouse as it is otherwise known, is situated within the conservation park. It is a white, square concrete tower with semicircular lantern. This operational lighthouse was established in 1962 and in 2005 the two reflectors and 1000W lamps were replaced by a low voltage system. It is managed by the Australian Maritime Safety Authority

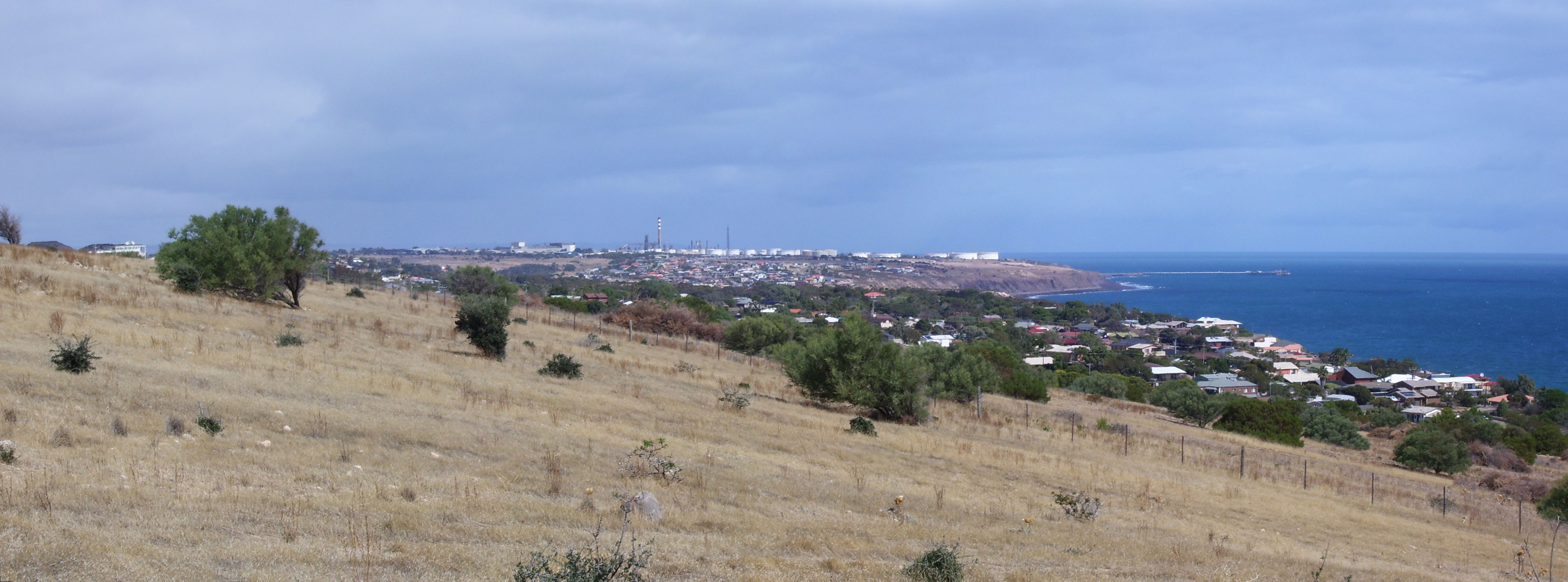
View of Hallett Cove and Port Stanvac

== Bushfires ==
A bushfire in November 2011 blackened a large part of the park. More, recently on the night of 4 December 2020, a fire started in the conservation park, which ended up taking 75 firefighters to bring it under control within an hour and several hours to extinguish completely. The Seaford railway line, which runs next to the park, had to be closed for a short while. A significant part of the park was damaged, and an investigation into the cause of the fire followed. Many of the plants affected by the fire have already started to regrow.

== See also ==
- List of protected areas in Adelaide
