= Hallett Cove Conservation Park =

Protected area in South Australia

- IUCN category III (natural monument or feature)
- Location within South Australia
- Location: South Australia
- Nearest city: Adelaide
- Coordinates: 35°04′25″S 138°29′57″E
- Area: 51 ha (130 acres)
- Established: 1 July 1976
- Governing body: Department for Environment and Water
- Website: Official website

Hallett Cove Conservation Park is a protected area in the Australian state of South Australia located in the suburb of Hallett Cove on the coast of Gulf St Vincent about 22 kilometres (14 miles) south of the centre of the state capital of Adelaide.

Hallett Cove is one of the best known geological sites in Australia and is known for its international significance. The area has been declared a Geological Monument by the Geological Society of Australia and placed on the South Australian Heritage Register for its educational and scientific significance. It is also a site of great archaeological significance, with evidence of some of the earliest Aboriginal settlement documented in Australia, dated at 40,000 years ago.

Some of the features in the park are Waterfall Creek, Black Cliff and the Amphitheatre. A freshwater spring near Waterfall Creek is one of the features of the Tjilbruke Dreaming Track. As of 2021 the park is included in the Glenthorne Precinct of protected areas.

== History ==
=== Aboriginal occupation ===
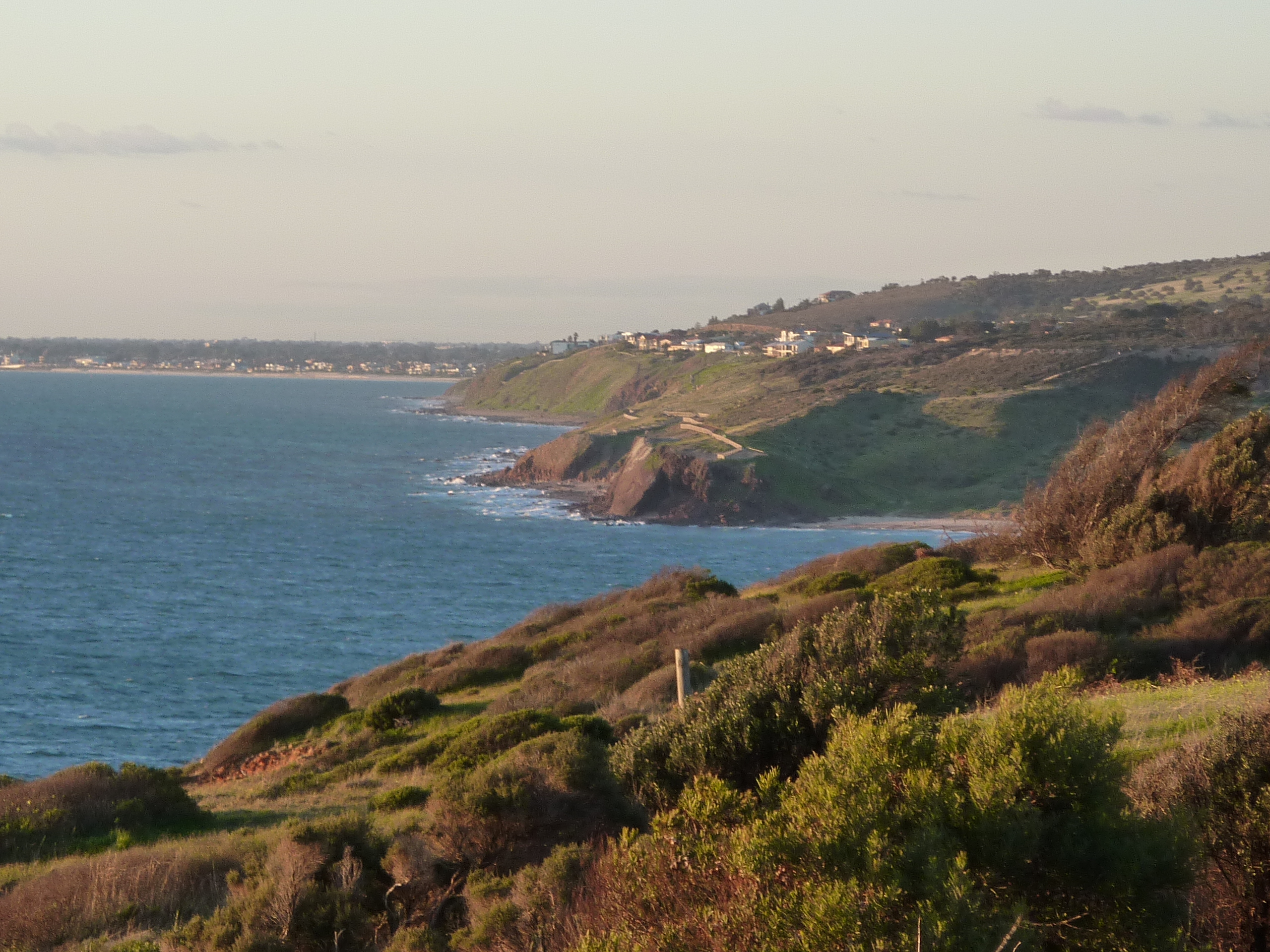
Looking north. From the right: Hallett Cove beach, Black Cliff, Sandison Park. Waterfall Creek runs to the beach through a gully alongside the housing. Aboriginal campsites were located along the creek to the railway line (the scrub to the right of the housing).

Aboriginal settlement of the Hallett Cove area is among the earliest documented in Australia. Archaeological evidence in the form of more than 1700 large stone tools near the coast and at a campsite at Waterfall Creek, north of Black Cliff, shows the presence of the Kartan people of Kangaroo Island, shows a settlement dating back to 40,000 years BP. The first tools were discovered in 1934 by Harold Cooper of the South Australian Museum, with the rest discovered over a period of 36 years. The majority are heavily weathered Kartan stone tools weighing up to 5.5 kilograms (12 lb), with over 400 found around the large camp, indicating late Pleistocene occupation with various smaller tools gradually replacing them over time.

Although Kartan tools are traditionally made of quartzite, often sourced from great distances, all of the finds at Hallett Cove were made of siltstone despite large amounts of suitable quartzite being available on the beach. During the late Pleistocene, the sea level was around 90 metres (300 ft) lower than today. From 85,000 to around 15,000 years ago, the present Gulf St Vincent was a deep river valley to the west while the nearest site of exposed quartzite was likely near the coast, which during that time lay some 350 kilometres (220 mi) to the south. It has been suggested that a debris slope may have stretched far into the gulf, covering the local quartzite which had likely eroded out only after the present coastline was established around 6,000 years ago. The finds include a number of very well made quartzite tools of the type in use when Adelaide was settled.

More recently, the Kaurna people lived on two campsites dating back 2,000 years, and their middens contain shellfish remains and the otoliths (earstones) of Mulloway. Smaller camps have been found on the cliff edge which are believed to have been used by watchers waiting for migrating shoals of Mulloway.

Hallett Cove is a place of significance to the Kaurna people because of its association with the Dreaming of Tjilbruke, their creator ancestor. The Tjilbruke Dreaming story refers to seven freshwater springs south of Adelaide and down the Fleurieu Peninsula, with one most likely one that is located near the mouth of Waterfall Creek. This spring is surrounded by a number of campsites, both very ancient (Kartan) and more recent. There are commemorative plaques marking a significant point of the Dreaming track at the reserve on Keerab Way, and at the site of the first spring said to be created by Tjilbruke's tears, on the foreshore at Heron Way.

The spring, and Hallett Cove more broadly, has in the past mistakenly been ascribed the place name Krildhung (by Albert Karlowan) or Ka`reildung (Norman Tindale); however, this word is derived from a verb in the Ngarrindjeri language, but this has been found to be the result of mistaken location. A Kaurna version of the meaning of this word ("crying place") was created in 2008 as Murrkangga, and applied to the Amphitheatre.

=== European occupation ===
After the British colonisation of South Australia, Hallett Cove was named for John Hallett, who travelled into the area while searching for lost stock in 1837. In the 1840s the cove was used by smugglers to land goods at night which were then taken to Adelaide by dray. In 1847, the Worthing Mining Company purchased 800 acres (320 ha) from the Hallett family and built a copper mine on the northern side of Hallett's creek, now known as the Field River. However, the ground proved to be too hard and water kept flooding the diggings. In 1852 the miners left for the Victorian gold rush and the mine was finally abandoned in 1857. Farming began in what is now the eastern section of the park in the 1850s. In the late 1880s the cove was used for naval exercises and the southern area of beach was cleared of rocks to allow landings.

Walter Howchin at an outcrop south of Hallett Cove, c. 1920

Professor Ralph Tate realised that South Australia had been subjected to an ice age when in 1877 he discovered the area's smoothed and striated glacial pavement. In 1893, "the largest scientific excursion ever held in the Southern Hemisphere" explored the area with Prof. Walter Howchin later demonstrating that the deposits were of Permian age and that Australia was closer to the south pole than today while part of the Gondwanan supercontinent. During that time the south-western two-thirds of Australia, including much of South Australia was covered by an ice sheet. The first detailed description of the geology of the area was published in 1943.

In 1957 Professor A.R. Alderman from the University of Adelaide wrote to the National Trust of South Australia recommending that the glacial pavements along the coastal cliff tops of Hallett Cove be preserved. In 1960, local farmer George Sandison died and the beneficiaries of his estate donated 3.25 acres (1.32 ha) of land, a narrow strip along the cliff tops, to the National Trust of South Australia which was followed not long after by another 8.75 acres (3.54 ha) for an access road. In 1965 the donated land was proclaimed The Sandison Reserve.

In 1965 subdivision of the adjacent land for housing was announced. For the next 11 years conservationists fought against developments. In late 1969, the State Planning Authority declared 51 acres (21 ha) of Hallett Cove a site of scientific interest which prohibited landowners from developing the land in any way that would destroy its scientific value. In 1970 it was announced that the surrounding land would be subdivided and a large private marina built in the cove. The government received tens of thousands of letters of protest and significant public debate ensued. Premier Dunstan guaranteed to protect the area and the government later acquired the cove and a further 67 acres (27 ha) of land.

=== Conservation park ===
In 1976, the park was declared a Conservation Park dedicated for the protection of features of geological and historic interest.

After the creation of the Glenthorne National Park–Ityamaiitpinna Yarta in 2020, Hallett Cove Conservation Park became part of the Glenthorne Precinct, along with Marino Conservation Park, areas of the Field River valley and Happy Valley Reservoir.

== Geology of the park ==
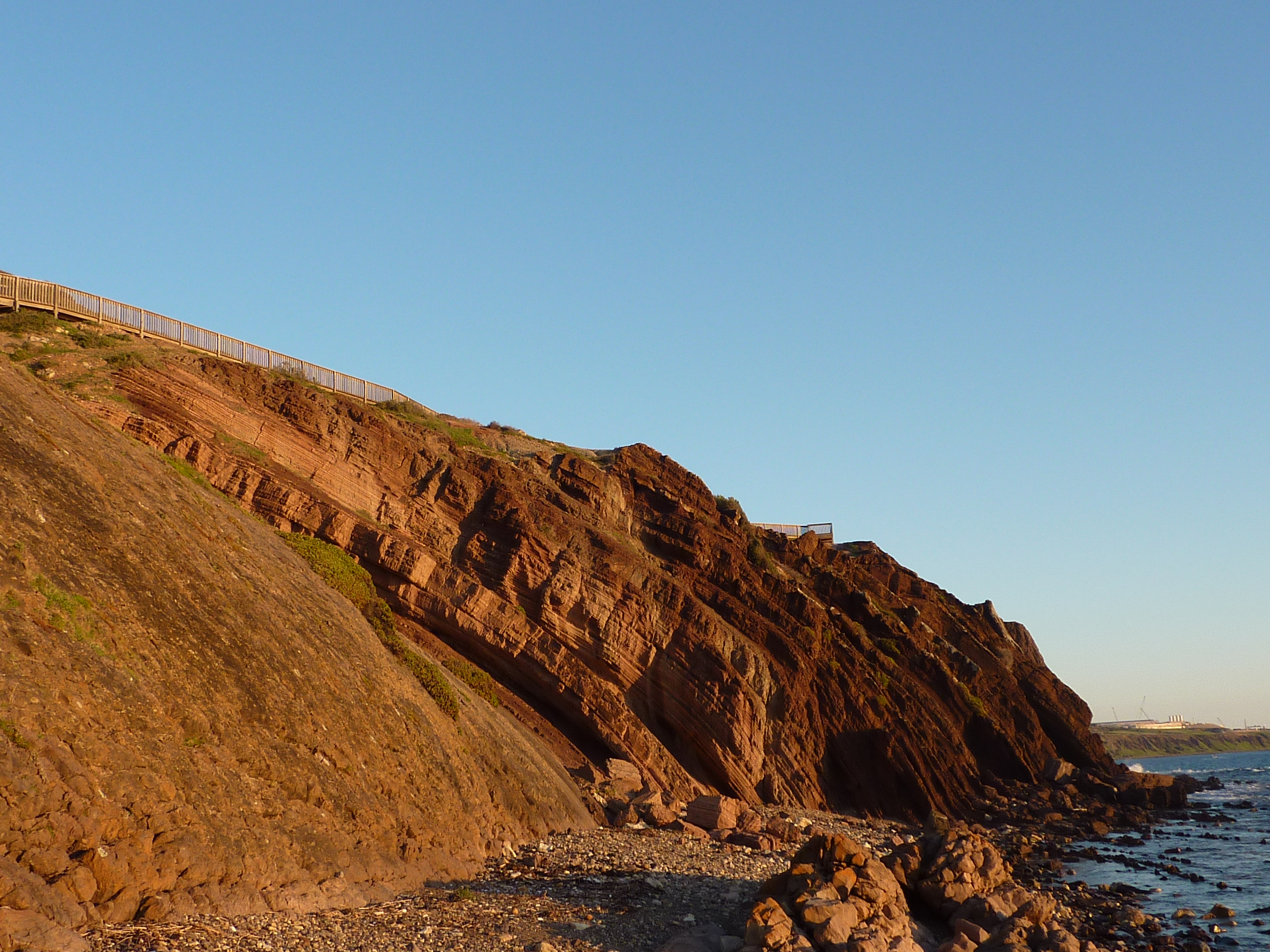
The 600 million year old (Precambrian) rock folds of Black Cliff, looking south. The 270-million-year-old Permian glacial pavement lies at the cliff top.

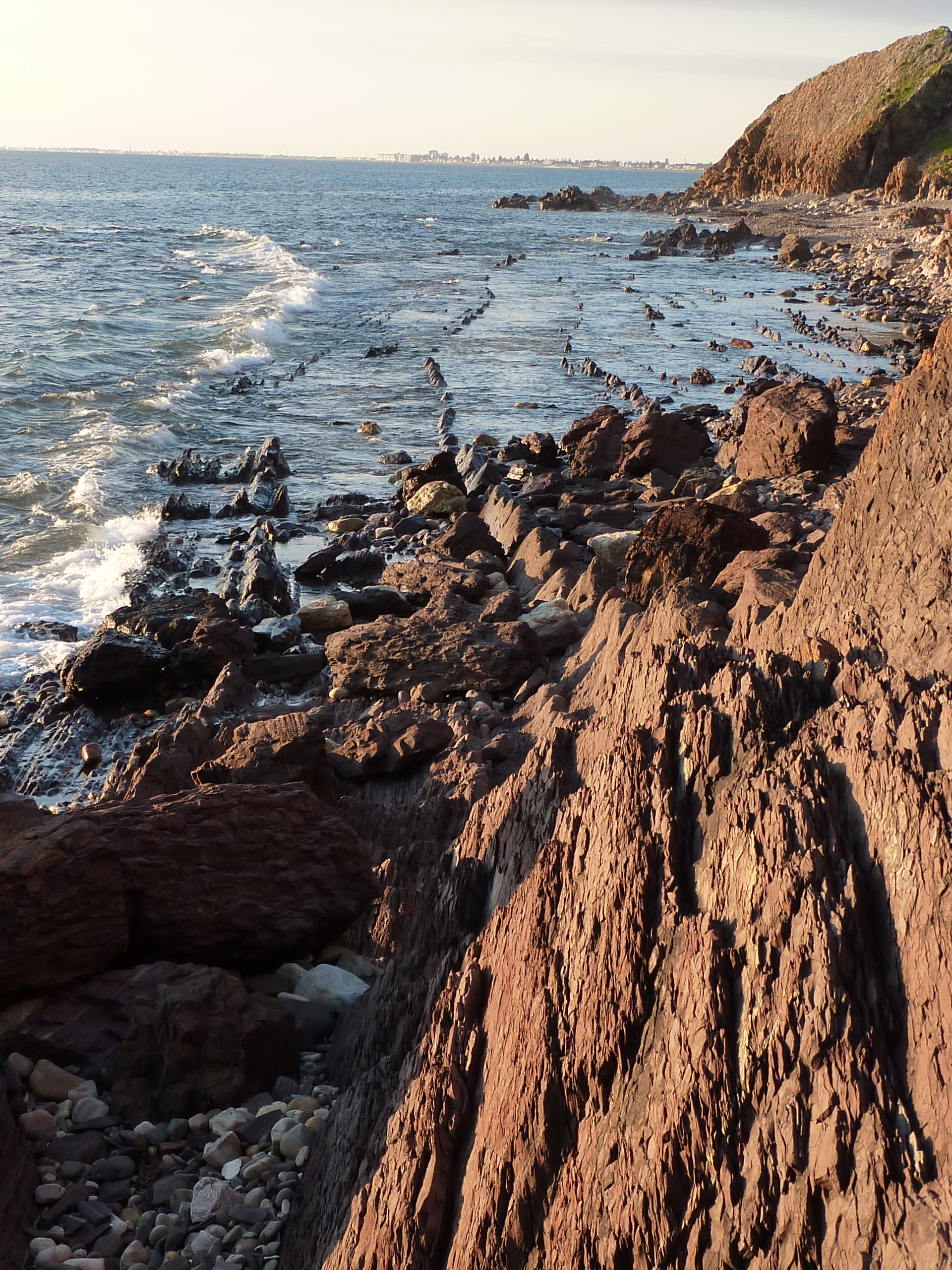
Resistant rock strata exposed on the wave-cut platform below Black Cliff, looking north.

=== Late Precambrian ===
Ripple marks in the oldest Hallett Cove rocks indicate that the sediments that formed them originated on a tidal plain during the upper Precambrian. The plain was part of a shallow sea that bordered an ancient stable landmass to the west while to the east lay ocean as the eastern half of Australia had yet to form. The shallow sea extended around 700 kilometres (430 mi), from the northernmost Flinders Ranges to Kangaroo Island and lay above an unstable depression called the Adelaide Geosyncline which slowly sank as sediments built up, keeping pace so that the water remained shallow from about 870 Ma (the middle Neoproterozoic) to ~500 Ma (the end of the Cambrian). Sediments sinking to the sea floor accumulated, reached a depth of 8 kilometres (5.0 mi) locally to 10 kilometres (6.2 mi) in depth in the Flinders Ranges.

From around 550 Ma the beds of the Geosyncline began a series of intraplate extensional and contractional events. The beds began to buckle, fold, uplift and block fault, creating a range of mountains called the Delamerian Highlands, possibly up to 8 kilometres (5.0 mi) in height. Almost immediately the mountain range began eroding heavily and this process continued for another 200 Ma. The Precambrian rock of Black Cliff and the wave cut platform at Hallett Cove are all that remains of the base of the mountain range in this area and clearly shows complicated folding with several small faults visible. Erosion has removed rock dated less than 570 Ma, but younger overlaying rock (570 - 500Ma) is exposed further south between Sellicks Hill to Normanville. Cambrian fossils have been found in these younger rocks while no fossils have been found in those remaining at Hallett Cove.

Today, the remains of the southern section of the Cambrian mountain range are known as the Mount Lofty Ranges which have eroded down to below 730 metres (2,400 ft).

=== Permian ===
The 600 Ma Precambrian rocks at Hallet cove are separated from the 270 Ma Permian deposits by an unconformity. If there were periods of deposition between the two periods, erosion has removed all trace.

The formation of Pangaea resulted in extensive glaciation over much of Australia during the Carboniferous and Permian. It is believed that by 270 Ma Australia was part of a supercontinent called Gondwanaland. Crescent shaped cracks in the glaciated pavements at Hallett Cove show that the ice flowed N/NW towards what is now the center of Australia. The ice thus originated in the uplands of land to the south. If current theories of continental drift are correct, this land was Antarctica. The Permian record at Hallett Cove not only records the passage of glaciers but their retreat.

Hallett Cove at this time was part of a river valley orientated with the mountain range to the NE. Ice had scoured a basin and meltwater from the retreating glacier formed a lake which deposited the sediments that can be seen today along the clifftops. Although no fossils have been found in these sediments, arthropod trails have been found in similar sediments further south. Dropstones and erratics, rocks carried by glaciers which drop when they melt, litter the beach where the Permian sediments that once held them have long since been eroded away. Smaller ones can be found still embedded in the sediments. Most of the dropstones, some bigger than cars, originated from sites hundreds of km to the south, however, several consist of rock not found in South Australia and their origin has yet to be determined. One erratic currently eroding out at the top of Black Cliff is dated 400 Million years older than the oldest Hallett Cove rocks. Made of Tillite, it is the earliest evidence of glaciation ever recorded.

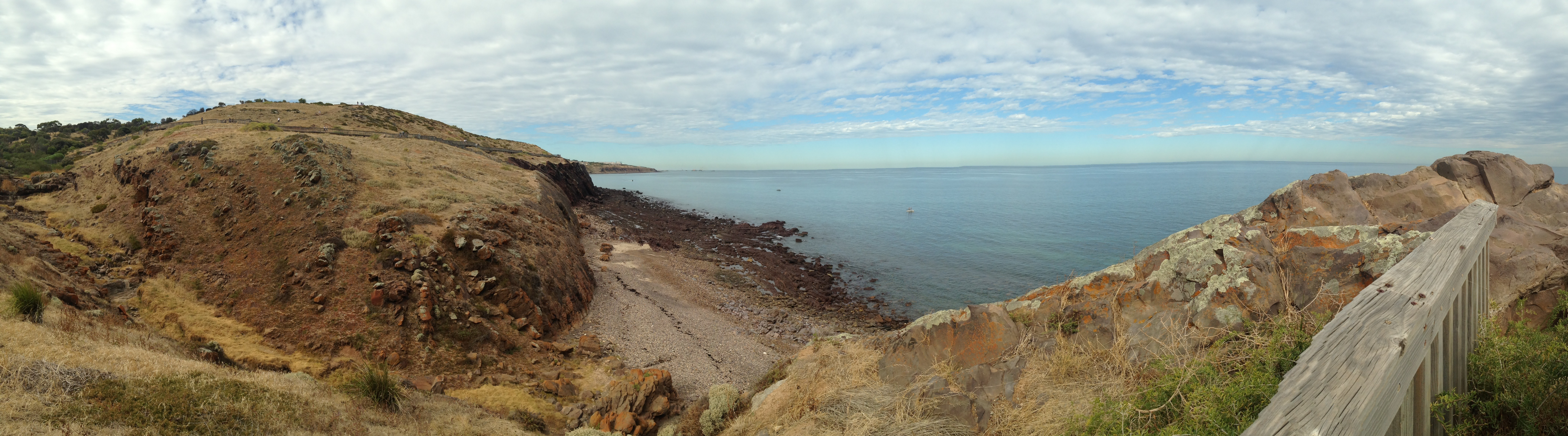
Black Cliff viewed from the north

=== Pliocene ===
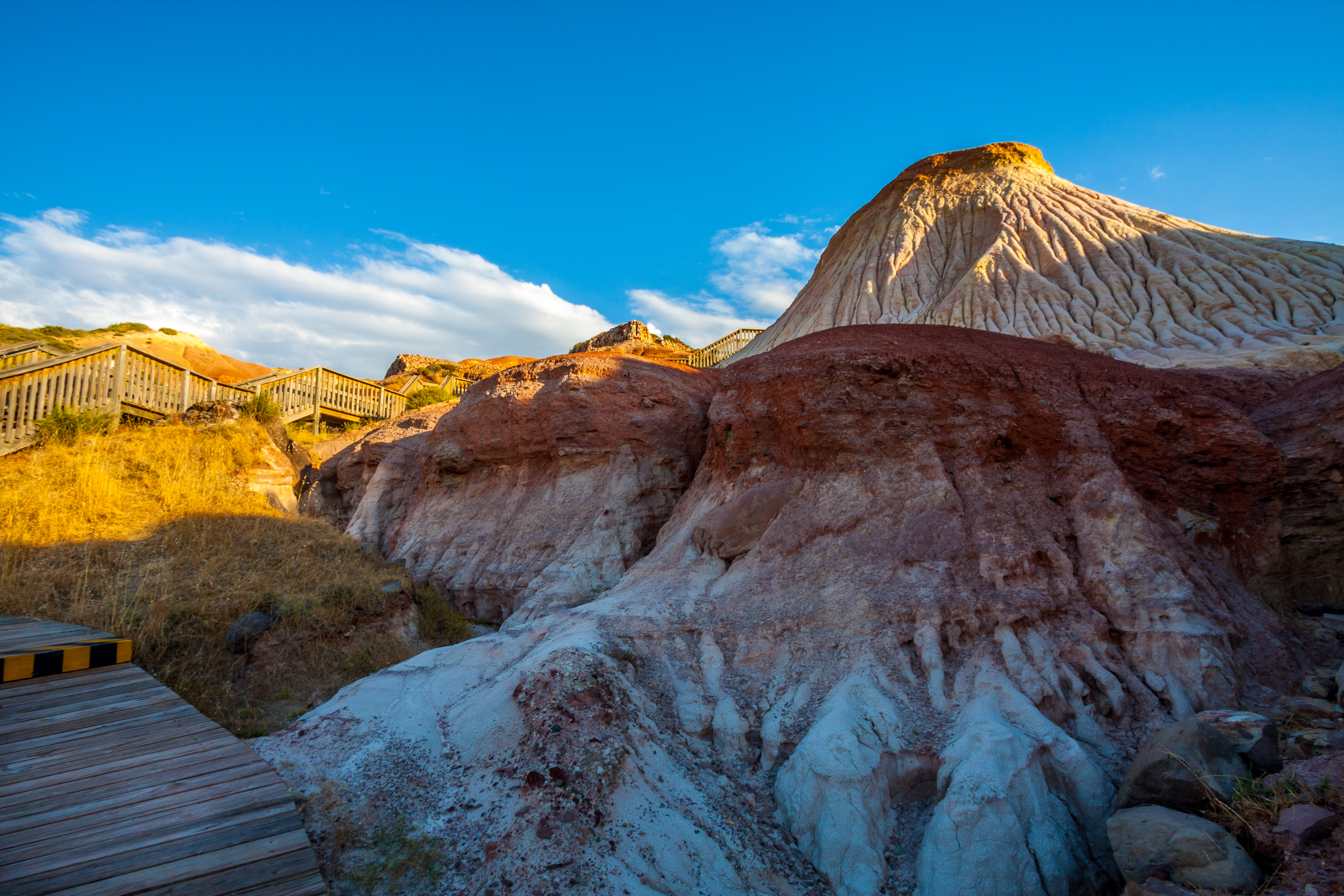
The Sugarloaf

A second period of erosion began around 250Ma which removed most of the Permian sediments in the region with the exception of some that were protected by the Hallett cove basin. This forms the second unconformity that separates the Permian from the Pliocene deposits.

By the Cenozoic, the Mt Lofty Ranges had worn down to sea level. A period of faulting commenced which uplifted the ranges and downthrust the plains which, beginning 50Ma was flooded by the sea. By 20Ma the land west of the ranges was a shallow sea. Hallett Cove has no sediments from this period indicating it may have been above sea level, an island in a shallow sea.

Further faulting raised the Mt Lofty Ranges to a little higher than their current elevation and submerged Hallet Cove. Dated at 5Ma to 3Ma, a band of sandstone that had been laid down on a sea floor can be found overlaying the Permian deposits. This layer contains fossil shells and limy sands. Overlaying the sandstone is a considerable thickness of mottled clays with patches of sand and gravel, the sediments washed down from the slopes of the Mt Lofty Ranges from 3Ma to 1Ma when the area was a river flood plain.

=== Pleistocene ===
The Pleistocene climate was marked by repeated glacial cycles. During the early pleistocene the rapid accumulation of clays indicates a much wetter climate than today. Following the end of the last glaciation 15,000 years ago, the climate appears to have dried out somewhat as a layer of calcrete overlays the clay deposits. The Gulf St Vincent was an alluvial plain drained by an ancient river when Aboriginals first settled on the Hallett Cove clifftops and their tools have been found in the sand that lies above the calcrete.

=== Recent ===
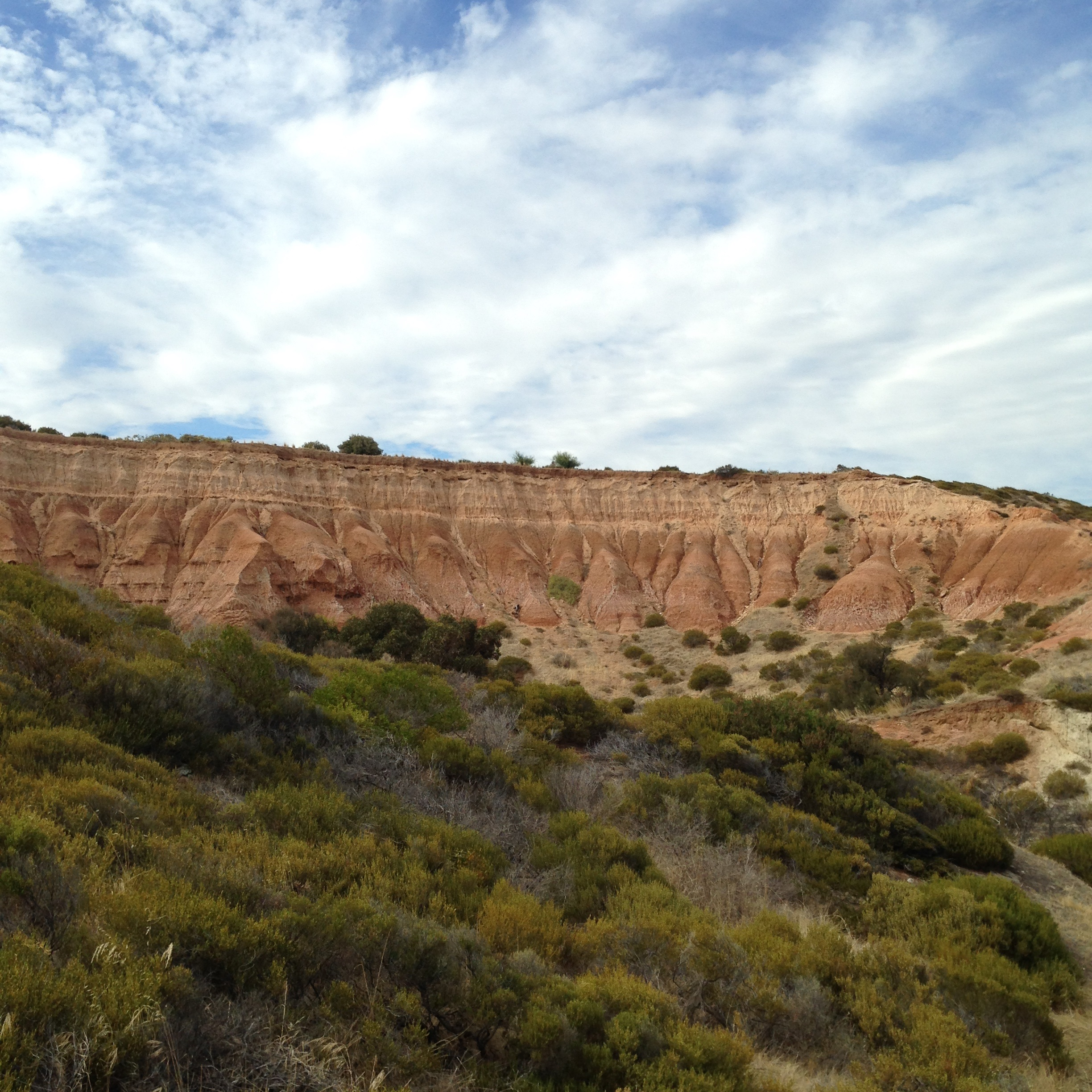
The Amphitheatre rock formation

As the glaciers retreated in the Northern Hemisphere, the sea levels rose worldwide. The current sea level stabilised around 6,000 years ago and began to erode the Hallett Cove cliffs. As the folds in the cliff face are almost vertical, the cliff face retreats as the sea breaches the quartzite layers that protect the softer siltstone layers between them forming the zigzag pattern we see today. As the cliff retreats it leaves a wave cut platform behind.

The Amphitheatre is a feature of the park where the Precambrian rocks are below sea level. Without their protection erosion is rapidly cutting through the soft Permian, Pliocene and Pleistocene deposits resulting in a badlands terrain. As the silts are eroded erratics are released which roll down to the base platform and beach.

An interpretative walking trail describes the park's cultural and geological heritage.

== See also ==
- List of protected areas in Adelaide
- Adelaide Rift Complex
