= Hallett Cove, South Australia =

Hallett Cove
- Suburb
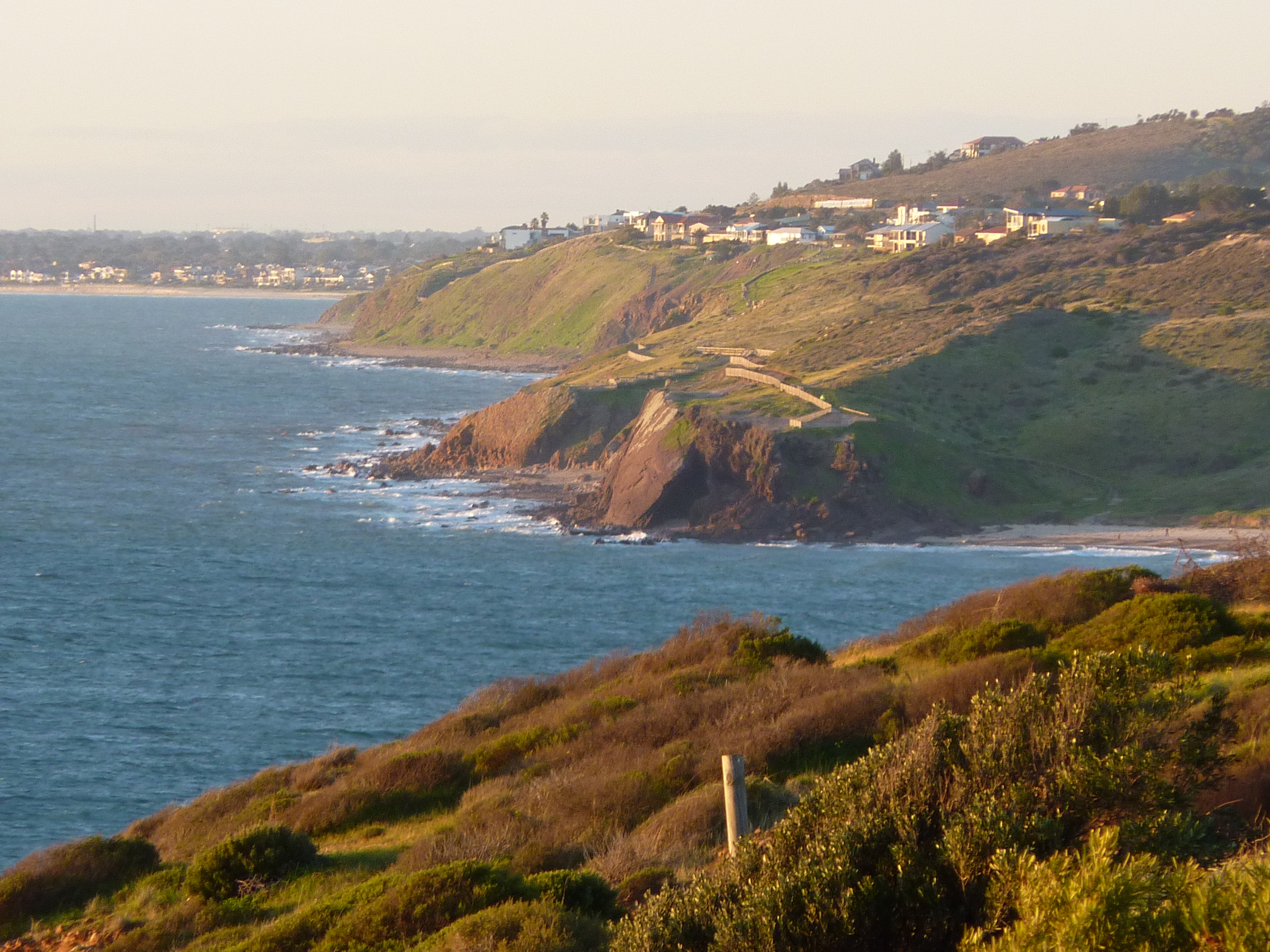

- Coordinates: 35.077°S 138.502°E
- Country: Australia
- State: South Australia
- City: Adelaide
- LGA: City of Marion
- Location: 21 km (13 mi) from Adelaide

Government
  - State electorate: Black
  - Federal division: Kingston

Area
  - Total: 10.1 km^{2} (3.9 sq mi)

Population
  - Total: 12,512 (SAL 2021)
- Postcode: 5158
Suburbs around Hallett Cove
Marino	Marino	O'Halloran Hill
Gulf St Vincent	Hallett Cove	Sheidow Park
Lonsdale	Lonsdale	Reynella

Hallett Cove is a coastal suburb of Adelaide, South Australia located in the City of Marion 21 kilometres (13 miles) south of the Adelaide city centre. It has a population of more than 12,000 people. Adjoining suburbs are Marino to the north, Trott Park and Sheidow Park to the east and Lonsdale to the south.

The name Kareildung has been mistakenly ascribed to Hallett Cove as an Indigenous name. The Kaurna name of Murrkangga was derived from the meaning of Kareildung and applied specifically to the Amphitheatre in the Hallett Cove Conservation Park.

Sites within the conservation park are of great geological and archaeological significance, as well as containing sites of great cultural significance to the Kaurna people, including a significant site on the Tjilbruke Dreaming Track. The park features Aboriginal artefacts used by the Kaurna people about 2,000 and the Kartan people up to 40,000 years ago. Geological features include glacial striations on the clifftop which form part of the evidence for the Permian glaciation of southern Australia, then part of Gondwana.

Hallett Cove itself is a small rocky beach, named after John Hallett, who came across it in 1837 whilst searching for missing stock. The Field River runs out to sea at the southern end. The cliffs to the north are part of the conservation park.

== History ==
Aboriginal settlement of the Hallett Cove area is among the earliest documented in Australia. Archaeological evidence in the form of more than 1700 large stone tools near the coast and at a campsite at Waterfall Creek, north of Black Cliff, shows the presence of the Kartan people of Kangaroo Island, shows a settlement dating back to 40,000 years BP.

More recently, the Kaurna people lived on two campsites dating back 2,000 years. The site of a freshwater spring said to be created by the tears of Tjilbruke, the creator being, is of particular significance.

The spring, and Hallett Cove more broadly, has in the past mistakenly been ascribed the place name Krildhung (by Albert Karlowan) or Ka`reildung (Norman Tindale); however, this word is derived from a verb in the Ngarrindjeri language, and found to be the result of mistaken location. A Kaurna version of the meaning of this word ("crying place") was created in 2008 as Murrkangga, and applied to the Amphitheatre.

The small rocky beach was named Hallett Cove after John Hallett, who came across it in 1837 whilst searching for missing stock.

== Geology ==
Geological features include glacial striations on the clifftop discovered by Professor Ralph Tate in 1877, which along with similar striations found earlier at Selwyn's Rock at Inman Valley, 40 km (25 mi) to the south in 1859, provide evidence for the Permian glaciation of southern Australia, then part of Gondwana. There are also a number of large glacial erratics on the beach.

== Facilities ==
The Hallett Cove Shopping Centre (now named the Hallett Cove Pavilion) is the suburb's largest shopping centre, and includes underground parking, a food court, a Big W department store, and Woolworths and Drake's supermarkets.

The suburb has three schools. Hallett Cove School was established in 1987 and is situated in the middle of the suburb. Hallett Cove East Primary School is in the Karrara estate on the northern side of the suburb. The Hallett Cove South School is the oldest school in the suburb and is situated near the Hallett Cove School.

The Catholic Church in the suburb is dedicated to Saint Martin de Porres.

== Transport ==
Hallett Cove Railway Station is on top of the cliffs to the north of the beach, and services the greater Hallett Cove area. Originally the line ran inland from there to Reynella and ultimately to Willunga but the section from Hallett Cove onwards was closed in 1969 and the track past Hallet Cove was lifted in 1972. The Coast to Vines rail trail is a cycle and pedestrian path that now follows the old line. A new railway extension was built south along the coast to Noarlunga; Hallett Cove Beach is the first station on this line. Both stations underwent a refurbishment in 2011, giving them a more modern look.

Bus routes serviced by the Adelaide Metro run through Hallett Cove, terminating at the Hallett Cove Shopping Centre and Hallett Cove Beach Station.

== See also ==
- List of Adelaide suburbs

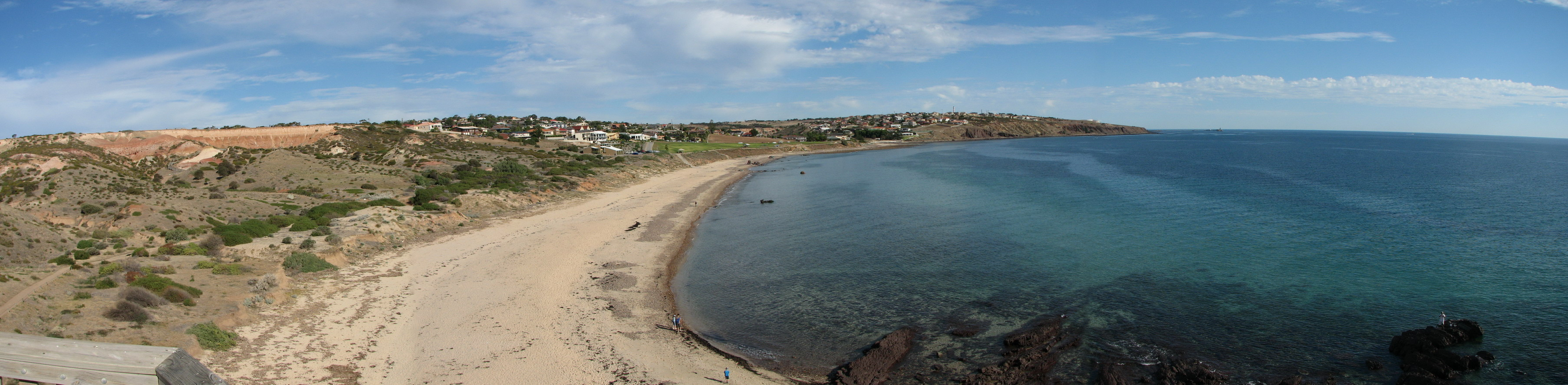
Panoramic photo of Hallett Cove including Hallett Cove beach and the conservation park
