= Happy Valley Dam =

Dam and reservoir in Adelaide, South Australia

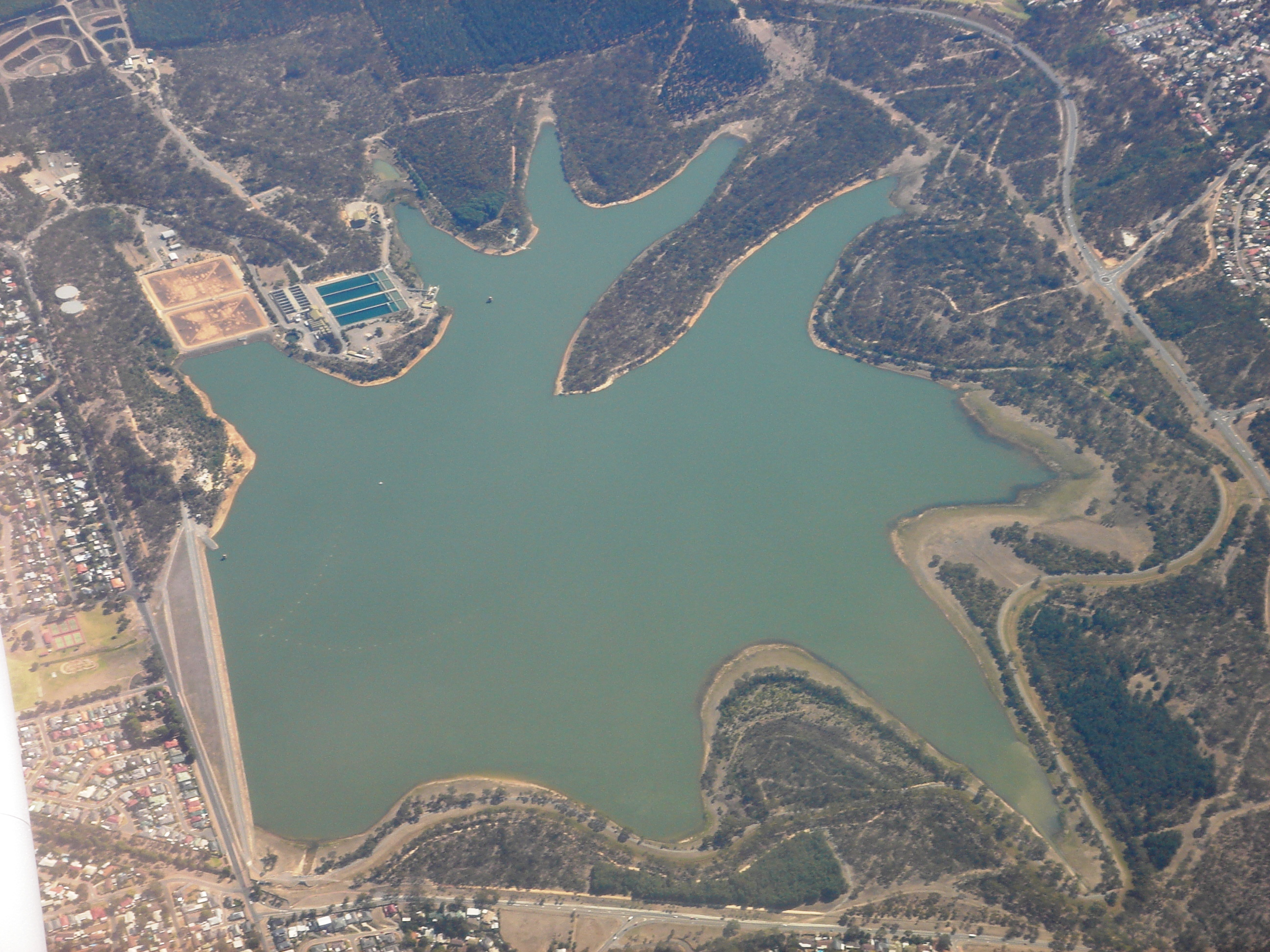
- Aerial view of the reservoir, in 2007. The earthen embankment is pictured at left.

- Location of the dam in Adelaide
- Interactive map of Happy Valley Dam
- Country: Australia
- Location: Happy Valley, South Australia
- Coordinates: 35°04′30″S 138°33′51″E
- Purpose: Water supply
- Status: Operational
- Construction began: 1892
- Opening date: 1897 (original); 2004 (wall raised)
- Construction cost: A$1.8 million
- Owner: Government of South Australia
- Operator: SA Water

Dam and spillways
- Type of dam: Earth fill dam
- Impounds: Off-stream
- Height: 34 m (112 ft)
- Length: 806 m (2,644 ft)
- Dam volume: 547×10^{3} m^{3} (19.3×10^{6} cu ft)
- Spillway type: Uncontrolled
- Spillway capacity: 79 m^{3}/s (2,800 cu ft/s)

Reservoir
- Creates: Happy Valley Reservoir
- Total capacity: 14.53 GL (11,780 acre⋅ft)
- Active capacity: 11.5 GL (9,300 acre⋅ft)
- Catchment area: 20 km^{2} (7.7 sq mi)
- Surface area: 193 ha (480 acres)
- Normal elevation: 146 m (479 ft) AHD

South Australian Heritage Register
- Official name: Happy Valley Reservoir - Dam Walls and Towers
- Type: Utilities - Reservoir
- Designated: 8 November 1984
- Reference no.: 12710

The Happy Valley Dam is an off-stream earth-filled embankment dam, located in Happy Valley, a southern suburb of Adelaide, in South Australia. Constructed in 1897, the resultant reservoir, the Happy Valley Reservoir was built to supply potable water to Adelaide when the total population of city was 315,200. (Note: According to the city's 1893 census.) In 2005, the reservoir supplied over half a million people, from Adelaide's southern extent to the city centre.

The dam and reservoir were added to the South Australian Heritage Register on 8 November 1984.

== Overview and construction ==
Built between 1892 and 1897 at a cost of A$1.8 million it was the third dam constructed in South Australia as a supplement to the Thorndon Park Reservoir (built 1860) and the Hope Valley Reservoir (built 1872).

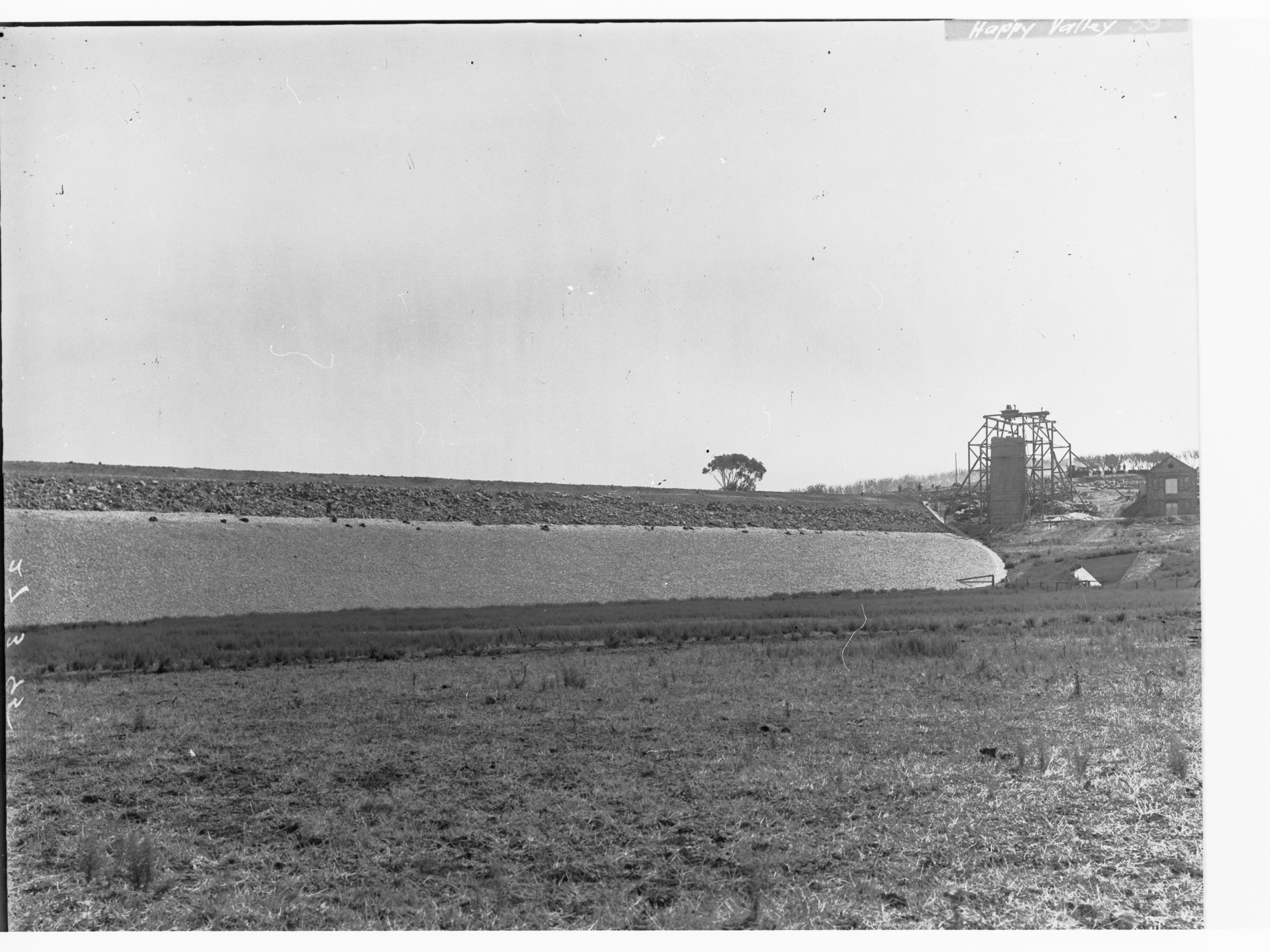
The dam under construction, September 1897

The original Happy Valley township, school and cemetery were completely flooded by the impounded reservoir, requiring their relocation. The township was moved to the east while the cemetery, which is still in use today, was moved to the west and relocated alongside the base of the dam wall. The school, originally located on Candy road, was relocated south to zero point eight one hectares (two acres) on Red Hill Road (later renamed Education road) which was donated by local farmer, Harry Mason. While some students attended O'Halloran Hill or Clarendon schools for the 18 months that the Happy Valley school was closed, some did not attend any school until it was re-opened on 26 September 1898. The school closed in December 1979 and re-opened on a new site on the other side of the road directly opposite.

The earth-filled dam wall is 34 metres (112 ft) high and 806 metres (2,644 ft) long. When full, the reservoir has capacity of 14.53 gigalitres (11,780 acre⋅ft) and covers a surface area of 193 hectares (480 acres), drawn from a catchment area of 20 square kilometres (7.7 sq mi). The uncontrolled spillway has a flow capacity of 79 cubic metres per second (2,800 cu ft/s).

The reservoir acts as a 'holding pond' for water directed to it from the Clarendon Weir via a 5-kilometre-long (3.1 mi) tunnel. The 1.8-metre (5.9 ft) diameter tunnel was bored simultaneously from both ends and when meeting had a deviation of 25 millimetres (0.98 in). The tunnel's deepest point underground is 122 metres (400 ft) where it passes through a hill. On 7 August 1896 the tunnel's inlet valve was opened by the Governor of South Australia, Sir Thomas Fowell Buxton and the reservoir began filling.

=== Continuing use ===
Located 15 kilometres (9.3 mi) from the Adelaide central business district, the reservoir is now largely enveloped by the city's southern suburbs, of which the relocated Happy Valley village is now one. Although the reservoir is relatively small in capacity; holding only 11.5 gigalitres (9,300 acre⋅ft) and is dwarfed by Mount Bold Reservoir which is at least four times larger, it is the site of the biggest water treatment plant in Adelaide and is responsible for providing more than 40% of the city's water.

Water from the dam was originally supplied to Adelaide through a tunnel under Black Road. In the early 1960s, the original intake tunnel from the Clarendon Weir was increased in size to allow access by maintenance vehicles, and a second outlet tunnel was constructed under South Road. In 1986 this new tunnel became the sole outlet for the reservoir when the original outlet was abandoned. At the same time the Thorndon Park Reservoir was decommissioned and reestablished as a recreational park.

=== Upgrades ===
Between 2002 and 2004, the reservoir underwent a major renovation as part of an A$22 million rehabilitation project aimed at enhancing the reservoir to meet guidelines of best practice for dam management at both international and national levels. The reservoir's earth wall was particularly susceptible to piping failure (a small leak, called a pipe, gets larger until the dam collapses) and the renovations lowered the risk of dam wall failure from 1 in 1,200 to an estimated 1 in 100,000. Part of this project included an upgrade of the dam wall designed to also increase flood storage capacity by 165% and reduce the risk of damage in the event of an earthquake.

With the lowering of the water level during renovations exposing the original Happy Valley township for the first time, archaeologists took the opportunity to excavate the site. Despite the township being entirely intact and undamaged when flooded in 1896, very little was found apart from scattered bricks and the foundations of several buildings, of which only the post office was identified.

In 2020, a further major renovation occurred, when the majority of the remaining pine plantations were cleared to allow the construction of a 13-megawatt (17,000 hp) ground-mounted solar panel array, designed to supply the water treatment facility entirely with green energy, reducing operating costs.

== Recreational use ==
The reservoir was opened to the public on 11 December 2021 for the first time in more than 120 years, after a network of trails and other facilities were built by the South Australian government. The dam and its surrounding grounds are part of the Glenthorne Precinct, along with Marino Conservation Park, areas of the Field River valley, Hallett Cove Conservation Park and the Glenthorne National Park–Ityamaiitpinna Yarta, which was opened in 2020.

The natural "bush" of the reservoir's enclosed catchments are home to kangaroos, echidnas and koalas. Several areas have also been planted with managed pine plantations to reduce soil erosion and provide an income from harvesting. As a result of the plantations being located within what are now inner city suburbs they have become almost iconic. In the early 2000s, plans to harvest the mature pines were blocked following public protests over the visual impact the clearance and replanting would have on the surrounding suburbs.

== See also ==
- List of reservoirs and dams in South Australia
