= Kartan industry =

Kartan industry is the archaeological production, probably more than 10,000 years ago, of a large quantity of exceptionally large stone tools that were found on Karta, known since 1802 as Kangaroo Island, South Australia.

== Archaeology of Karta ==
=== An island mystery ===
Kartan culture archaeology presents a puzzle, according to historian Rebe Taylor, who quotes the archaeologist Ronald Lampert: "The problem had all the characteristics of a classic mystery story: a large offshore island without people [today], separated .. nearly 10,000 years ago, yet with abundant evidence of human population." Indeed, Lampert called his book The great Kartan mystery.

=== Heavy stone tools ===
James Kohen, in his book Aboriginal Environmental Impacts, describes the Aboriginal stone tool assemblage of Karta as "heavy core tools and pebble choppers". Such Kartan tools are also, writes Kohen, found on the South Australian coast, the Flinders Ranges, and at Lime Springs in New South Wales.

According to Kohen, "the Kartan industry consists almost exclusively of large core tools, unifacially flaked pebble tools and hammerstones". The tools are very heavy, averaging around 900 grams, "perhaps ten times the average of any other assemblage".

Some of the Kartan tools are "horsehoof" cores, defined by Josephine Flood as having a "flat base, an overhanging, step-flaked edge, and a high, domed shape like a horse's hoof"; their function is unexplained, and while they might have been used as choppers, they could simply be waste cores from the production of flake tools.

Over 120 Kartan sites have been found, yielding thousands of pebble choppers and hundreds of hammerstones. Most of the Kartan tools from Kangaroo island itself are composed of Quartzite brought into the sites from as far as 35 kilometres away.

=== Use of large game animals ===
Few Kartan flakes have been found, but Kohen reports one find by Draper on Kangaroo Island, in a site dated to 7000 years ago, "a chopper which may well have been used to butcher sea lions"; sea lion bones were found with the pebble tool. However, Kohen cautions, the possible link between Kartan industry and "butchering of large game" does not prove that large animals "were actively hunted".

=== Likely age ===
Josephine Flood, writing in her Archaeology of the Dreamtime, suggests that "the Kartan choppers are the earliest tools in Australia", most likely more than 16000 years old.

== See also ==
- Hallett Cove Conservation Park

== Bibliography ==
- James L. Kohen. Aboriginal Environmental Impacts. University of New South Wales Press, 1995. ISBN 978-0-86840-301-4 Google books
- R. V. S. Wright. Stone Tools as Cultural Markers: change, evolution, and complexity. Australian Institute of Aboriginal Studies, 1977. ISBN 978-0-391-00835-9 Google books
- Derek John Mulvaney and Johan Kamminga. Prehistory of Australia. Smithsonian Institution Press, 1999. ISBN 978-1-56098-804-5 Google books
- Josephine Flood. Archaeology of the Dreamtime. University of Hawaii Press/Angus and Robertson. 2nd Edition, 1995. ISBN 978-0-207-18448-2 Google books
- Ronald John Lampert. The great Kartan mystery. Books Australia, 1981. ISBN 978-0-909596-62-0 Google books
- Rebe Taylor. Unearthed: The Aboriginal Tasmanians of Kangaroo Island. Wakefield Press. Illustrated edition, 2002. ISBN 978-1-86254-552-6 Google books
