= Glenthorne National Park–Ityamaiitpinna Yarta =

Park in Australia

Coordinates: 35°03′11″S 138°32′42″E

Glenthorne National Park–Ityamaiitpinna Yarta is a South Australian national park in the southern Adelaide suburb of O'Halloran Hill, 16 km (9.9 mi) south of the city centre.

The park opened to the public in November 2020, and as of 2021 O'Halloran Hill Recreation Park is in the process of transitioning to become part of it. It includes the nearby Glenthorne Estate, and will connect with other parks and parcels of land in Adelaide's south to form the Glenthorne Precinct. These include Hallett Cove Conservation Park, Marino Conservation Park, areas of the Field River Valley and the Happy Valley Reservoir.

The Kaurna people are the traditional owners of the greater Adelaide region, including this area, and still maintain a deep relationship with Country, which they have done for tens of thousands of years through their customs and Tjukurpa. Tjukurpa.

The park includes important grey box grassy woodland, and more than 90 species of birds have been spotted within its boundaries, including:

- Adelaide rosella - Platycercus elegans adelaidae
- Grey fantail - Rhipidura albiscapa
- Kookaburra - Dacelo novaeguineae
- Willie wagtail - Rhipidura leucophrys
- Yellow-tailed black cockatoo - Calyptorhynchus funereus
- Yellow-faced honeyeater - Lichenostomus chrysops
