= Michael Tye (artist) =

Australian artist

Michael Tye (born 1960) is a mosaic artist specialising in the design, fabrication and installation of unique mosaic and decorative tilings. He also works as a community artist and has worked on community mosaic projects throughout South Australia.

Starting out as a graphic designer, Michael spent a few years in the printing and advertising industry before moving onto ceramic design. From 1990 to 1996 he ran a pottery studio, making a range of wheelthrown and sculptural ceramic objects, including functional tableware. In 1993 he created a unique ceramic artwork for the entrance to St. Andrew's Hospital, Adelaide, South Australia.

In 2004 Michael received the most outstanding project award from the Australian Tile Council for the mosaic artwork at the entrance of the Unley Civic Centre Library.

Since 1999 Michael has worked regularly with Carclew Youth Arts on public art projects. In these projects he mentors young artists in the creation of mosaic artworks. These artworks can be found throughout the Adelaide metropolitan area and in regional areas of South Australia.

Michael continues to work with communities across South Australia and enjoys helping them create mosaic artworks to enhance their local environment and to recognise significant events or features of their area. He also continues to explore and improve his own skills as an artist with self-directed work.
