= Field River =

Field
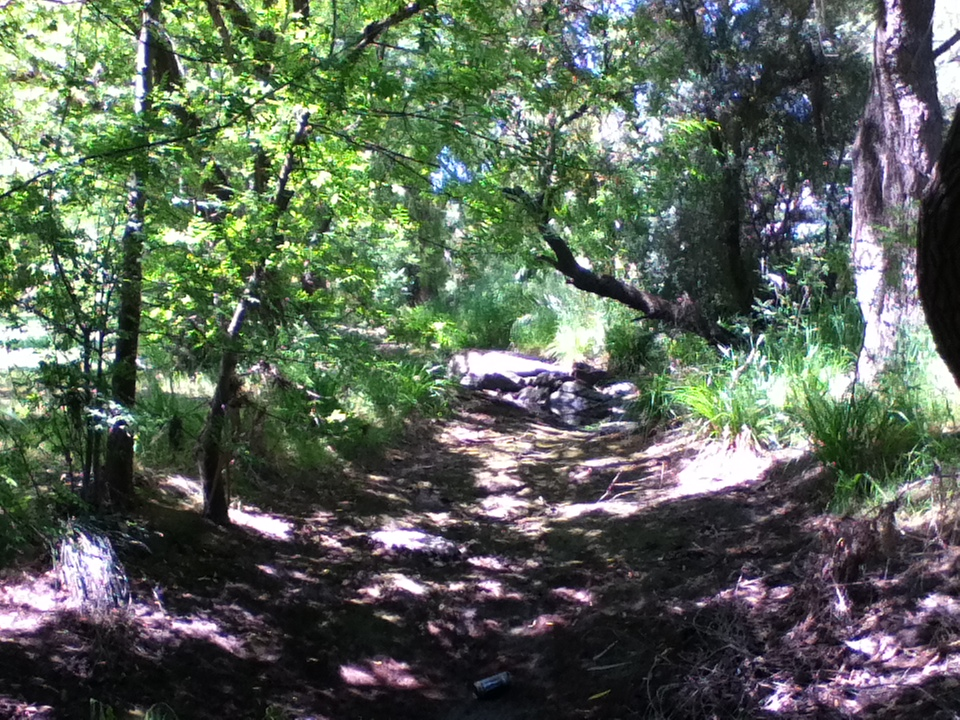
- Field River in summer 2012 near Happy Valley

- Location of the river mouth in South Australia
- Etymology: Lieutenant W. G. Field, RN

Location
- Country: Australia
- State: South Australia
- Region: Adelaide

Physical characteristics
- Source: Mount Lofty Ranges
- Mouth: Gulf St Vincent
  - location: south of Hallett Cove
  - coordinates: 35°05′02″S 138°29′37″E
- Basin size: 55.3 km^{2} (21.4 sq mi)

Basin features
- River system: Onkaparinga River

The Field River is an urban watercourse in the southern suburbs of Adelaide in the Australian state of South Australia.

== Course and features ==
Part of the Onkaparinga River catchment that drains the western slopes of the Mount Lofty Ranges, the Field River has a total area of 55.3 square kilometres (21.4 square miles) and drains the Happy Valley Reservoir, part of Main South Road and the Southern Expressway. Suburbs bordering the river include Hallett Cove, Reynella, Shiedow Park, Trott Park, Happy Valley and Woodcroft.

The stream flow of the Field River is highly seasonal and variable with an average annual runoff of 5,100 million litres (1.1×10^{9} imperial gallons; 1.3×10^{9} US gallons). The majority of the stream can dry out completely during summer, staying that way well into autumn. The final portion of the river is spring fed and flows into the Gulf St Vincent all year round.

The Field River flows through or is bordered by the City of Marion and City of Onkaparinga. The lower reaches of the river ran through private property owned by the Sheidow family until 1993 when the land was sold for housing development and became Cove Point in the suburb of Hallett Cove The stretch of the river further inland on the south eastern side of Lonsdale Road is presently in private ownership. This parcel of land has been identified as being an important part of the proposed "Great Southern Urban Forest" of Adelaide.

As of 2021 part of the Field River valley is being connected with Glenthorne National Park–Ityamaiitpinna Yarta as part of the new Glenthorne Precinct.

A number of primary schools, including Braeview, Reynella East and Hallett Cove South, have projects underway which involve revegetation and other environmental studies of the Field River.

== History ==
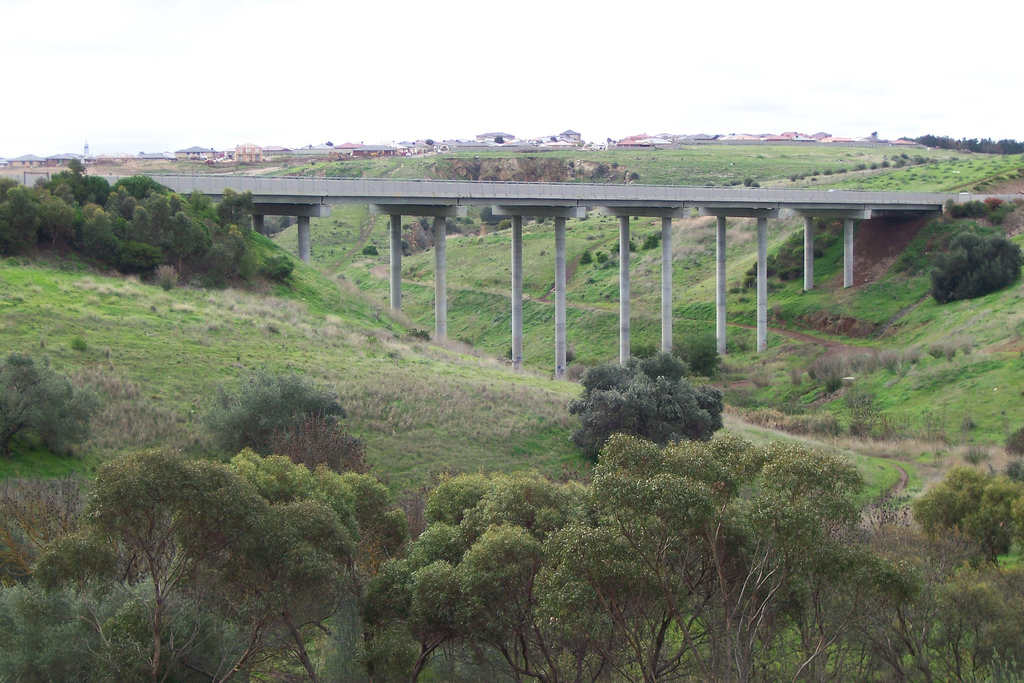
Southern Expressway bridge over the Field River in Reynella

In the 1840s the mouth of the Field River was used to land contraband goods for market in Adelaide. In 1850 a State Government Commission examining locations for secure anchorage suggested that the mouth of the river was a suitable site for a harbour.

The discovery of copper in the 1840s at the Worthing Mine (on the south eastern side of Lonsdale Road) promoted interest in using the Field River as a means of transporting the copper ore from the mine to the sea. By 1856 mining had ceased due to the lack of further investment money. The majority of the Field River runs along steeply inclined undeveloped land which was quarried during the early 20th century.

The importance of the coastline to the Kaurna people, the indigenous inhabitants of the region, is clearly demonstrated with large quantities of cultural material collected from areas adjacent to the outflow of the Field River.

In 1992 the fossil remains of the world's largest marsupial, the Diprotodon, were discovered on the bank of the river by Trevor Westlake. The fossil, which is at least 70,000 years old, is now in the care of the South Australian Museum.

== Etymology ==
The river was named after Lieutenant W. G. Field, RN, who served under Colonel Light on his journey to South Australia in 1836 aboard the brig Rapid. Light visited the river in 1837 while surveying the area.

After initially being named the Field River the name was changed to Hallett Creek due to the Onkaparinga River also being known as Fields River. It was subsequently renamed Field River during the 20th century, however, in 1990 consideration was given to changing the name to Serpentine Creek.

== See also ==
- List of rivers of Australia § South Australia
