= South Road =

Road in Adelaide, South Australia

South Road Main South Road South Australia
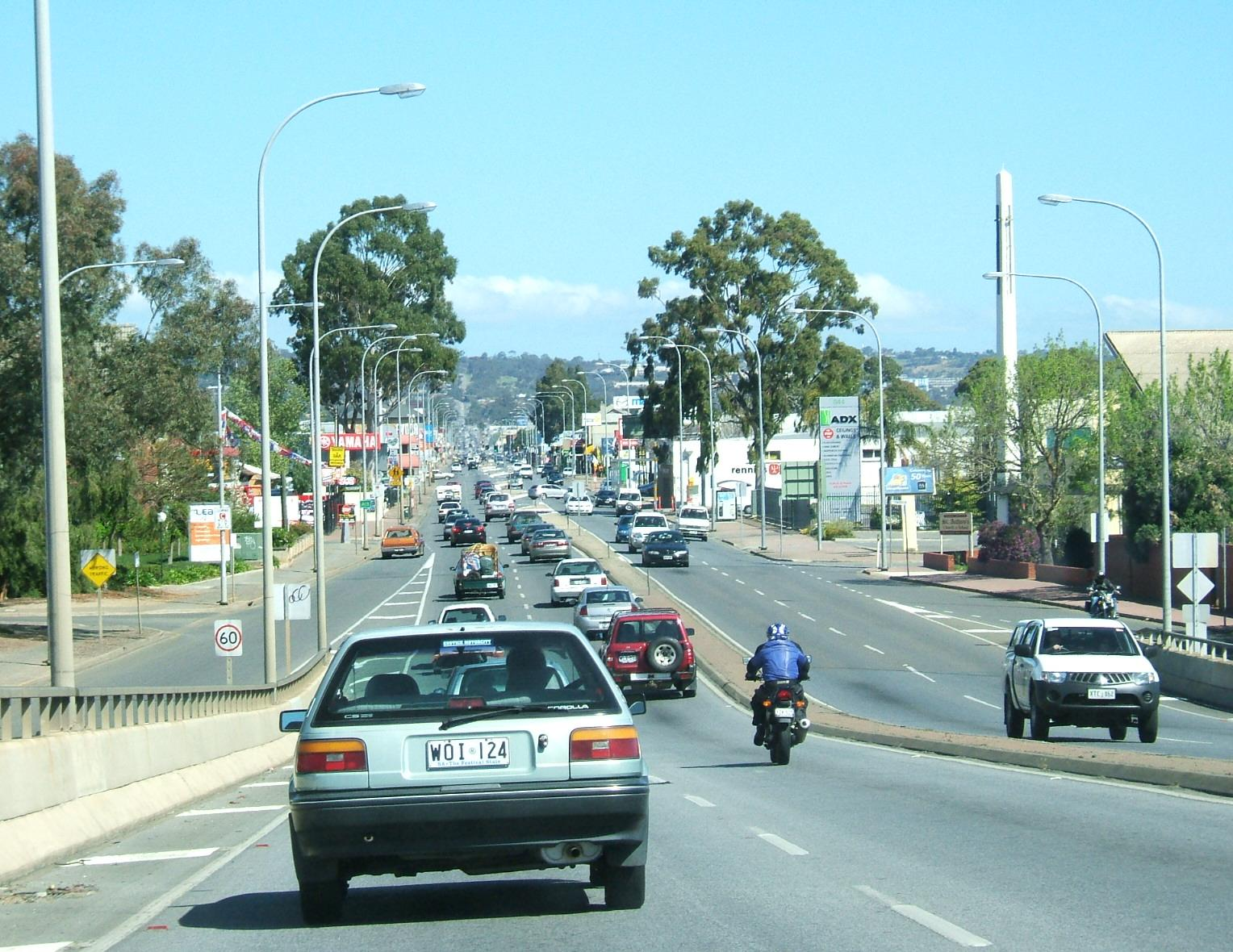
- South Road near Edwardstown
- Coordinates: 34.832856°S 138.562539°E (North end); 35.606187°S 138.094712°E (South end)

General information
- Type: Road
- Length: 117 km (73 mi)
- Route number(s): A2 (2017–present) (Wingfield–Darlington); A13 (1998–present) (Darlington–Old Noarlunga); B23 (1998–present) (Old Noarlunga–Cape Jervis); Concurrencies: R1 (2017–present) (through Mile End South)
- Former route number: National Highway A13 (1998–2017) (through Wingfield); A13 (1998–2017) (Wingfield–Darlington)

Major junctions
- North end: Salisbury Highway; Port River Expressway; Wingfield, Adelaide
- Grand Junction Road; Port Road; Sir Donald Bradman Drive; Anzac Highway; Cross Road; Southern Expressway; Victor Harbor Road; Range Road
- South end: Flinders Drive; Cape Jervis, South Australia

Location(s)
- Region: Western Adelaide, Southern Adelaide, Fleurieu and Kangaroo Island
- Major suburbs: Croydon, Mile End, Reynella, Morphett Vale, Old Noarlunga, Aldinga, Sellicks Hill, Yankalilla

South Road (and its southern section as Main South Road outside of Adelaide) is a major north–south conduit connecting Adelaide and the Fleurieu Peninsula, in South Australia. It is one of Adelaide's most important arterial and bypass roads. As South Road, it is designated part of route A2 within suburban Adelaide. As Main South Road, it is designated part of routes A13 and B23.

The northern part of South Road contributes the central component of the North–South Corridor, a series of road projects under construction or planning that will eventually provide a continuous expressway between Old Noarlunga and Gawler.

== Route ==
South Road starts at the intersection of the Port River Expressway and the Salisbury Highway in Wingfield. It runs directly south, through much of Adelaide's inner western suburbs, close to the Adelaide city centre. It is complimented by, and in some instances, subsumed into the North-South Motorway. It either runs directly underneath it at ground level with the motorway above it on elevated carriageways, or straddles it on each side with the motorway lowered into a trench.

The motorway currently ends in Hindmarsh just south of the intersections with Port Road and Grange Road. South Road then becomes the main traffic route southwards.

South Road continues south through Mile End and Edwardstown until St Marys, where the Southern Expressway starts in a lowered trench. South Road straddles it on each side, until it reaches the intersection of Ayliffes and Shepherds Hill Roads at Tonsley, where its name changes to Main South Road. It continues through Old Noarlunga (where Victor Harbor Road branches off) and runs parallel to the coastline of Gulf St Vincent. At Normanville, it is known as Willis Drive for 2 km, then continues to Cape Jervis at its southern tip.

The Southern Expressway runs roughly parallel to Main South Road for 18 km between Darlington and Noarlunga and serves to reduce traffic congestion. Main South Road and the Southern Expressway have 3 different intersections along the length of the roads.

== History ==
The first reference to South Road was made in 1842. The South Australian Government Gazette referred to sheep stations near the corner of South Road and Sturt Road, in what is now Bedford Park.

South Road of today was until the 1970s known by a string of names: Shillabeer Avenue (from what was then its northern terminus at Regency Road to Torrens Road); Government Road (between Torrens and Port Roads); John Street (Port to Grange Roads); Taylors Road (between Grange and Henley Beach Roads); Fisher Terrace (Henley Beach Road to Anzac Highway), and South Road from Anzac Highway southwards.

The town of Old Reynella was bypassed in 1964. Old Noarlunga was bypassed in 1972.

The South Road Extension was built at Dry Creek in the early 1990s, connecting South Road and the Salisbury Highway, between Grand Junction Road and Port Wakefield Road. This was superseded by the Port River Expressway, which opened in 2005.

== Congestion and upgrades ==
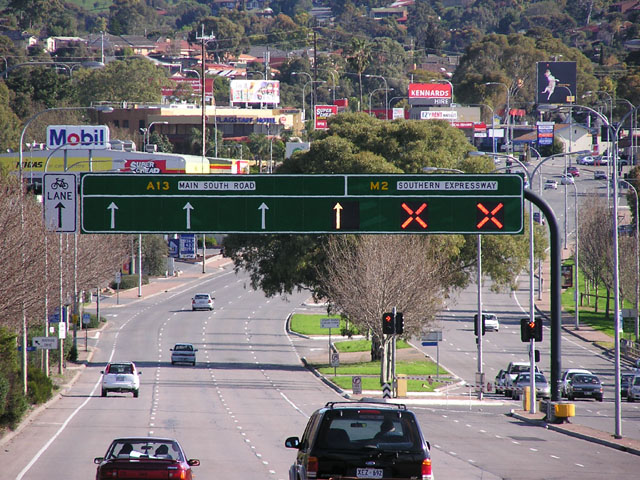
Main South Road approaching a junction with the Southern Expressway in 2005, with previous reversible carriageway signage before reconstruction in 2014

South Road suffers from traffic congestion due to its importance as one of Adelaide's main arterial roads and bypasses.

Between 1982 and 1984, an overpass was built at Emerson Crossing, taking South Road over Cross Road and the Seaford railway line. For a long time, this was the only grade separation on South Road, and one of very few in South Australia, removing congestion with Cross Road traffic and the railway line. However, increasing frequency of commuter trains results in vehicle bottlenecks that are anticipated to worsen. Queues on the exit ramps to Cross Road can extend into the through lanes on South Road. The rail crossing can be closed for up to 20 minutes in the peak hour.

In November 2005, the Royal Automobile Association (RAA) released its recommendations to the South Australian government in regards to the road network. South Road was found to be the poorest road in the state, registering a 2/10 on the RAA's scale. The recommendations given included $6 billion of funds to upgrade the roads of South Australia – with $1.5–2 billion to be spent on South Road alone. The RAA's plan for the road included a 6 km tunnel from Port Road all the way to the Anzac Highway underpass. The plan called for over/underpasses at six other major intersections and two rail crossings.

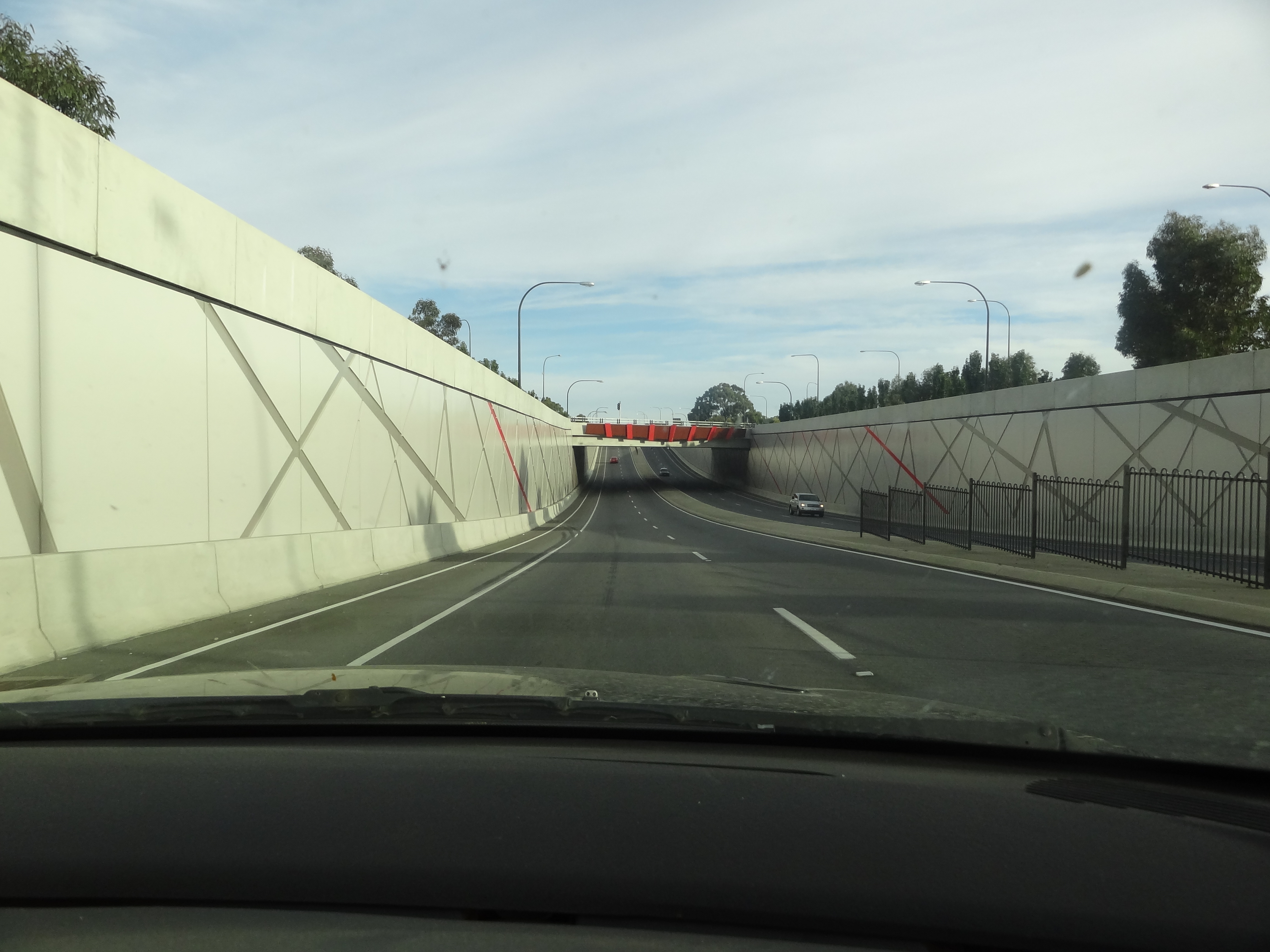
Going under the Anzac Highway Gallipoli Underpass, heading south, April 2012

In 2005, along with the decision to make a free flowing South Road, a decision was made to build an underpass for South Road to go under Anzac Highway. Named the Gallipoli Underpass in line with the ANZAC theme, construction started in 2007. The underpass opened in March 2009. To cut down on delays due to construction, an overpass was built at the same time for the Glenelg tram line just half a kilometre to the south, which opened in 2009, significantly removing delays from the area.

In August 2007, Prime Minister John Howard announced that South Road was to be included in the AusLink National Road Network, and pledged $1 billion in funding for the project between 2007 and 2020.

=== North–South Motorway ===
The North–South Motorway is an incomplete motorway intended to replace South Road as Adelaide's primary north–south roadway. Running along the same road corridor as South Road and extending further north, the motorway has been progressively constructed in stages. As of November 2020, approximately 22 km of the total 35 km length has been completed.

The first section of the motorway, known as the South Road Superway, was announced in October 2009. It is 3–4 km of elevated motorway running from the Port River Expressway to the intersection with Regency Road. The project started in 2010 and was completed in early 2014.

Following the 2013 Australian federal election, the section of South Road between Torrens Road and the River Torrens was identified and funded for an upgrade. 4 km of lowered motorway was built between the northbound and southbound lanes of South Road. The Torrens to Torrens lowered motorway started construction in 2015 and opened to traffic in 2018. The project included replacing a level crossing of the Outer Harbor railway line, with a new bridge in 2017.

The Darlington Upgrade, an extension of the Southern Expressway through Bedford Park by use of a similar lowered motorway concept, was also identified at this time. Both of these upgrades involved land acquisition to widen the road corridor, surface grade local carriage ways on the edges, and a lowered central roadway carrying the free-flow traffic below the crossing routes. The Darlington Upgrade began construction in 2016 and was opened in 2020.

An upgrade of Regency Road to Pym Street, the gap between the elevated South Road Superway and the (then) almost-completed Torrens to Torrens lowered motorway, was announced in May 2018, to be jointly funded by the state and federal governments. Main construction began in late 2019. The overpass opened at reduced speeds in March 2021.

Preliminary plans for the final section stretching from the River Torrens to Darlington (T2D), which would use a combination of deep-bored tunnels, lowered motorway and surface-level motorway, were announced in late 2020. As of 2025 T2D is under construction.

== Major intersections ==
| LGA | Location | km | mi | Destinations | Notes |
|---|---|---|---|---|---|
| Port Adelaide Enfield | Wingfield | 0.0 | 0.0 | Port River Expressway (A9 west) – Port Adelaide; Salisbury Highway (A9 east) – Salisbury | Northern terminus of South Road |
| Port Adelaide Enfield | Wingfield | 0.7 | 0.43 | Dry Creek-Port Adelaide railway line | |
| Port Adelaide Enfield | Wingfield | 0.8 | 0.50 | Cormack Road – Wingfield, Dry Creek | |
| Port Adelaide Enfield | Wingfield–Angle Park–Regency Park tripoint | 1.9 | 1.2 | Grand Junction Road (A16) – Port Adelaide, Gepps Cross, Northfield, Hope Valley | |
| Port Adelaide Enfield | Regency Park | 2.8 | 1.7 | Days Road – Ferryden Park | |
| Port Adelaide Enfield | Regency Park–Croydon Park boundary | 4.8 | 3.0 | Regency Road – Kilkenny, Sefton Park | |
| Charles Sturt | Renown Park–Croydon–Ridleyton tripoint | 6.3 | 3.9 | Torrens Road – Rosewater, Ovingham | |
| Charles Sturt | Croydon–Ridleyton–Hindmarsh tripoint | 7.6 | 4.7 | Outer Harbor railway line | |
| Charles Sturt | Croydon–Hindmarsh–West Hindmarsh tripoint | 7.8 | 4.8 | Port Road (A7) – Port Adelaide, Woodville, Hindmarsh | |
| Charles Sturt | Hindmarsh–West Hindmarsh boundary | 8.1 | 5.0 | Grange Road (west) – Allenby Gardens, Grange; Manton Street (east) – Hindmarsh | |
| Charles Sturt | Hindmarsh–West Hindmarsh boundary | 8.3 | 5.2 | North–South Motorway (M2) – Wingfield, Waterloo Corner | Northbound entry and southbound exit only Northern terminus of route A2, route M2 continues north along North-South Motorway |
| River Torrens | | 9.1 | 5.7 | Bridge over the river (historically "Taylor's bridge") | |
| West Torrens | Mile End–Torrensville boundary | 10.4 | 6.5 | Henley Beach Road – Fulham, Mile End | |
| West Torrens | Mile End–Mile End South–Hilton tripoint | 11.3 | 7.0 | Sir Donald Bradman Drive (A6) – Mile End South, Adelaide Airport | |
| West Torrens | Richmond–Mile End South boundary | 11.9 | 7.4 | James Congdon Drive (R1 northeast) – Thebarton; Deacon Avenue (southwest) – Richmond Oval | Concurrency with route R1 |
| West Torrens | Mile End South–Keswick–Richmond–Marleston quadripoint | 12.4 | 7.7 | Richmond Road (R1) – West Richmond, Keswick | Concurrency with route R1 |
| West Torrens–Unley boundary | Ashford–Kurralta Park–Everard Park–Glandore quadripoint | 13.7 | 8.5 | Anzac Highway (A5) – Keswick, Plympton, Glenelg | Diamond interchange under intersection |
| West Torrens–Marion–Unley tripoint | Everard Park–Black Forest–Kurralta Park–Glandore quadripoint | 14.3 | 8.9 | Glenelg tram line | |
| Mitcham–Marion–Unley tripoint | Black Forest–Clarence Park–Clarence Gardens–Edwardstown–Glandore meeting point | 15.3 | 9.5 | Cross Road (A3) – South Plympton, Glen Osmond | Diamond interchange over intersection with railway line |
| Mitcham–Marion–Unley tripoint | Black Forest–Clarence Park–Clarence Gardens–Edwardstown–Glandore meeting point | 15.3 | 9.5 | Seaford railway line (Emerson Crossing) | |
| Mitcham–Marion boundary | Melrose Park–St Marys–Edwardstown–Clovelly Park quadripoint | 18.7 | 11.6 | Daws Road – Park Holme, Clapham | |
| Mitcham–Marion boundary | Tonsley–St Marys boundary | 20.2 | 12.6 | Southern Expressway (M2 south) – Reynella, Old Noarlunga | Southbound entry and northbound exit only Southern terminus of route A2, route M2 continues south along Southern Expressway |
| Mitcham–Marion boundary | St Marys–Bedford Park–Clovelly Park tripoint | 20.7 | 12.9 | Ayliffes Road (east) – Pasadena, Goodwood; Shepherds Hill Road (south) – Blackwood | No right turn northbound from Ayliffes Road westbound Northbound entry to and southbound exit from Shepherds Hill Road only Name change: South Road (north), Main South Road (southwest) |
| Mitcham–Marion boundary | Bedford Park–Clovelly Park boundary | 21.0 | 13.0 | Sturt Road – Brighton, Flinders University | |
| Mitcham–Marion boundary | Bedford Park | 21.4 | 13.3 | Flinders Drive – Bedford Park, Flinders Medical Centre | |
| Mitcham–Marion boundary | Bedford Park | 21.8 | 13.5 | Southern Expressway (M2 north) – St Marys | Northbound entry and southbound exit only Northern terminus of route A13 |
| Sturt River | | 22.0 | 13.7 | Bridge over the river (bridge name unknown) | |
| Marion–Onkaparinga boundary | Darlington–Bedford Park–Sturt tripoint | 22.4 | 13.9 | Marion Road (A14 north) – Brooklyn Park, Plympton, Park Holme; Flagstaff Road (south) – Flagstaff Hill | |
| Marion–Onkaparinga boundary | O'Halloran Hill | 25.8 | 16.0 | Majors Road – Seaview Downs | |
| Marion–Onkaparinga boundary | O'Halloran Hill–Happy Valley boundary | 26.1 | 16.2 | Black Road – Flagstaff Hill | |
| Marion–Onkaparinga boundary | Happy Valley–O'Halloran Hill boundary | 26.5 | 16.5 | Chandlers Hill Road – Chandlers Hill | |
| Marion–Onkaparinga boundary | Happy Valley–O'Halloran Hill–Trott Park tripoint | 29.2 | 18.1 | Southern Expressway (M2 north) – Darlington, St Marys | Northbound entrance and southbound exit only |
| Marion–Onkaparinga boundary | Happy Valley–O'Halloran Hill–Trott Park tripoint | 29.2 | 18.1 | Panalatinga Road (south) – Onkaparinga Hills | |
| Onkaparinga | Old Reynella–Morphett Vale–Reynella tripoint | 32.5 | 20.2 | Sherriffs Road (west) – Lonsdale; Pimpala Road (east) – Woodcroft | |
| Onkaparinga | Morphett Vale | 33.9 | 21.1 | O'Sullivan Beach Road (west) – Lonsdale; Bains Road (east) – Morphett Vale | |
| Onkaparinga | Morphett Vale | 35.0 | 21.7 | Flaxmill Road (west) – Christie Downs; Wheatsheaf Road (east) – Morphett Vale | |
| Onkaparinga | Morphett Vale–Hackham–Hackham West tripoint | 36.2 | 22.5 | Beach Road (west) – Noarlunga Centre; Doctors Road (east) – Onkaparinga Hills | |
| Onkaparinga | Hackham–Hackham West–Huntfield Heights tripoint | 37.2 | 23.1 | Honeypot Road – Noarlunga Downs | |
| Onkaparinga | Hackham–Huntfield Heights boundary | 37.4 | 23.2 | Pennys Hill Road – Hackham | |
| Onkaparinga | Hackham–Huntfield Heights–Noarlunga Downs tripoint | 40.0 | 24.9 | Southern Expressway (M2 north) – Reynella, St Marys | Northbound entrance and southbound exit only |
| Onkaparinga River | | 41.4 | 25.7 | D.V. Fleming Bridge | |
| Onkaparinga | Old Noarlunga | 42.3 | 26.3 | Victor Harbor Road (A13) – McLaren Vale, Mount Compass, Victor Harbor | No right turn northbound into Victor Harbor Road southbound Northern terminus of route B23, route A13 continues south along Victor Harbor Road |
| Onkaparinga | Maslin Beach | 46.8 | 29.1 | Maslin Beach Road (A15 west) – Maslin Beach; Tatachilla Road (east) – McLaren Vale | |
| Onkaparinga | Aldinga | 52.4 | 32.6 | Old Coach Road – Aldinga, Maslin Beach | |
| Yankalilla | Myponga | 68 | 42 | Pages Flat Road (B34) – Mount Compass | |
| Yankalilla | Yankalilla | 82 | 51 | Inman Valley Road – Inman Valley, Victor Harbor | |
| Yankalilla | Delamere | 105 | 65 | Range Road (B37) – Parawa, Victor Harbor | |
| Yankalilla | Cape Jervis | 117 | 73 | Flinders Drive – Cape Jervis | Route B23 continues west over Backstairs Passage to Hog Bay Road on Kangaroo Island |
Concurrency terminus; Incomplete access; Route transition

== Tram stop ==
South Road is also the location of a stop on the Glenelg tram line.

| Preceding station | Adelaide Metro | Following station |
|---|---|---|
| Black Forest towards Royal Adelaide Hospital, Adelaide Entertainment Centre or Festival Plaza | Glenelg tram line | Glandore towards Moseley Square |

== Gallery ==
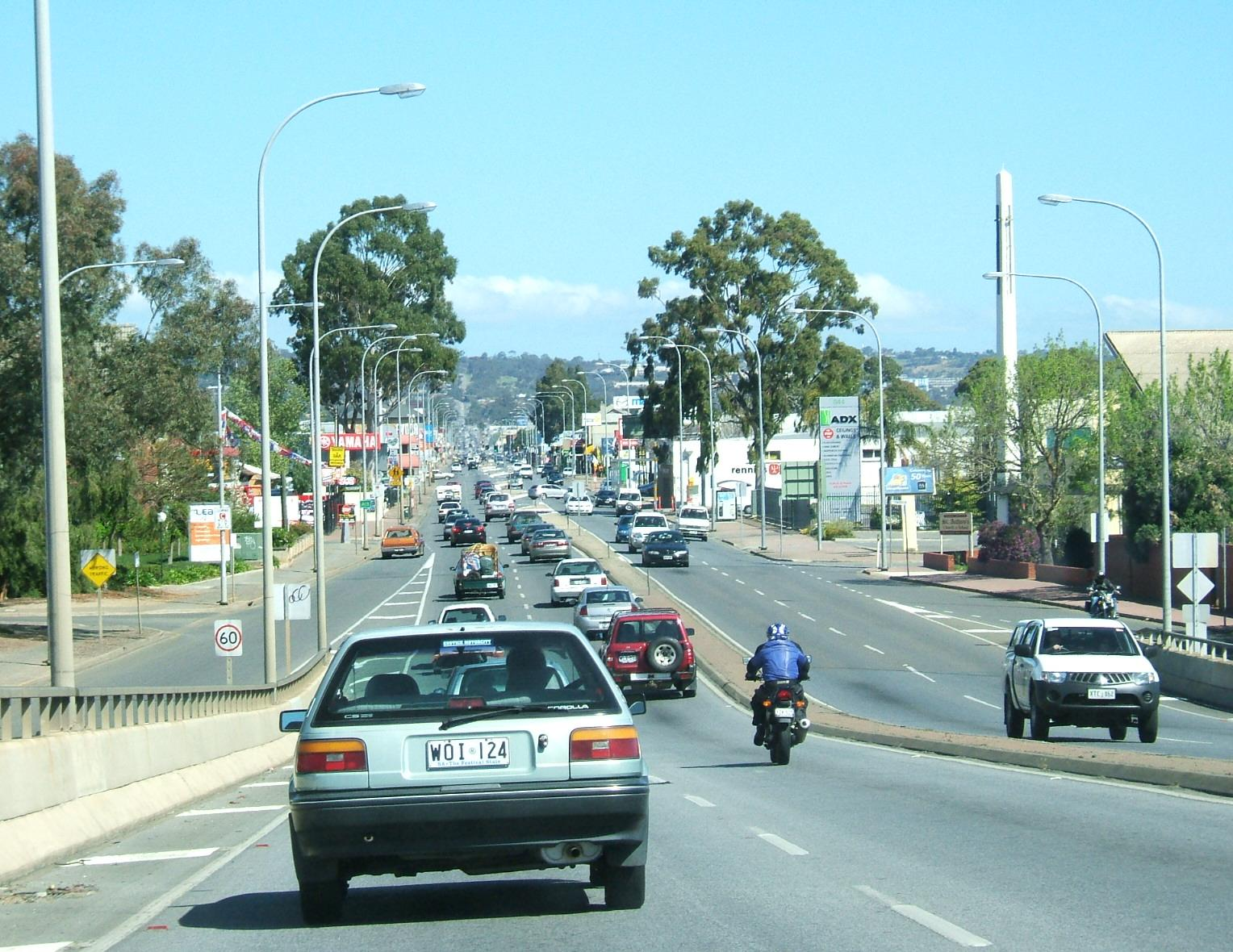
Looking south from the Cross Road Overpass, Edwardstown.

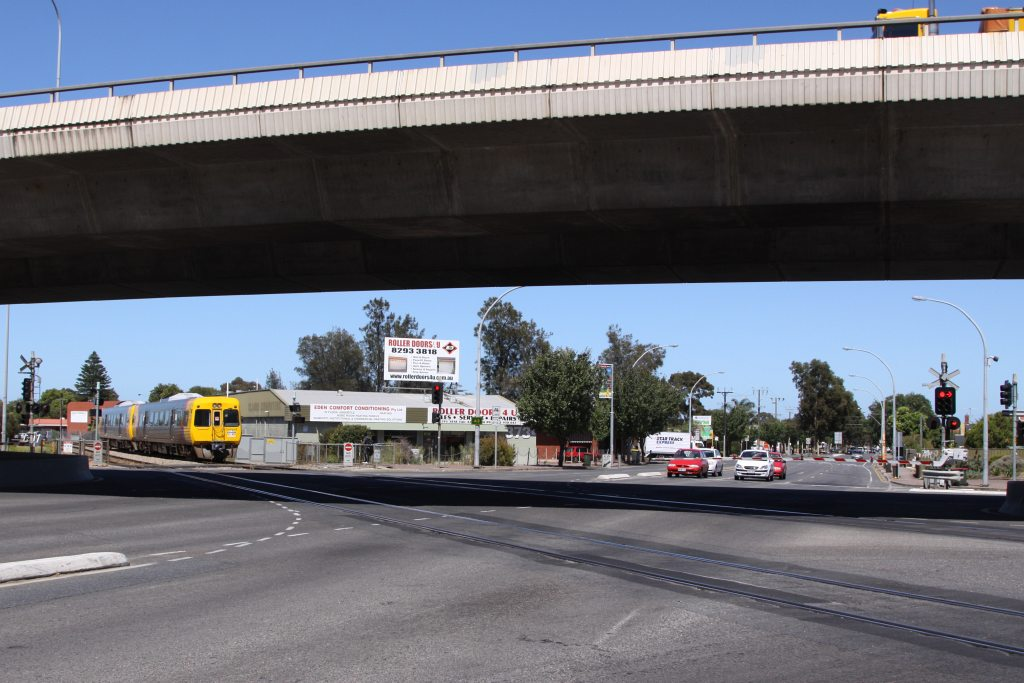
The South Road overpass at Cross Road / Emerson Station.

== See also ==
- Highways in Australia
- List of highways in South Australia
- Metropolitan Adelaide Transport Study
