= Electoral district of Baudin =

Former state electoral district of South Australia

Coordinates: 35°13′44″S 138°28′12″E

Baudin South Australia—House of Assembly
- State: South Australia
- Created: 1977
- Abolished: 1993
- Namesake: Nicolas Baudin
- Demographic: Metropolitan

Baudin was an electoral district of the House of Assembly in the Australian state of South Australia from 1977 to 1993. It was in the southern suburbs of Adelaide. In 1977, the polling places were: Christie Downs, Christies Beach, Hackham, Hackham East, Hallett Cove, Moana, Noarlunga, O'Sullivan Beach, Port Noarlunga and Seaford.

Most of the suburbs went to the newly created seat of Kaurna at the 1993 election.

== Member ==
Member	Party	Term
Don Hopgood	Labor	1977–1993
