= Seaford railway station, Adelaide =

Railway station in Adelaide, South Australia

Seaford
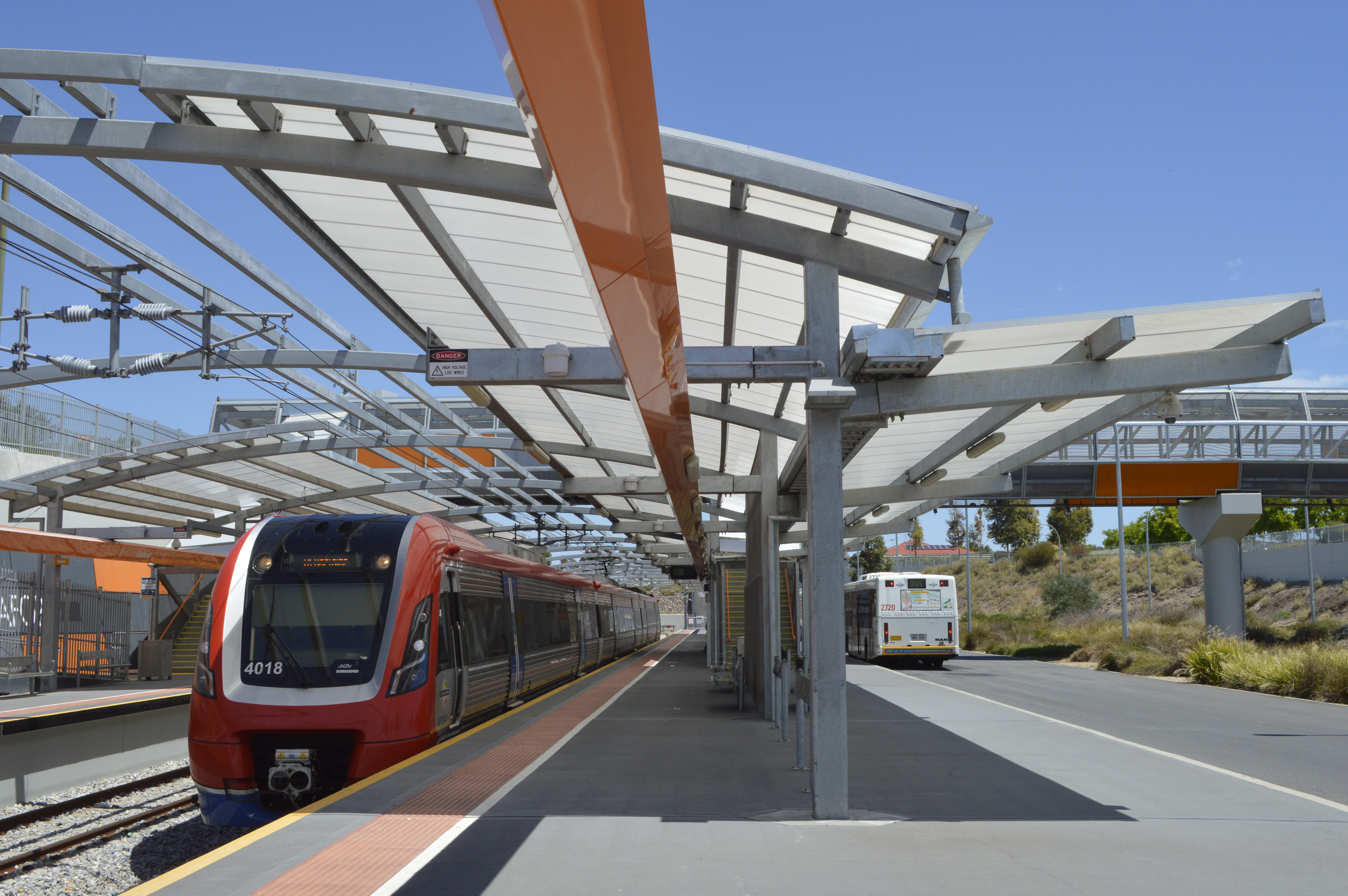
- Southbound view from Platform 1, January 2018

General information
- Location: Lynton Terrace; Seaford
- Coordinates: 35°11′20″S 138°29′00″E
- System: Railway station and bus interchange
- Owner: Department for Infrastructure & Transport
- Operator: Adelaide Metro
- Line: Seaford
- Distance: 35.9 km from Adelaide
- Platforms: 2
- Tracks: 2
- Connections: Bus; Regional Coach

Construction
- Structure type: Open cut
- Parking: Yes
- Cycle facilities: Yes
- Accessible: Yes

Other information
- Station code: 18680 (to City)
- Website: Adelaide Metro

History
- Opened: 23 February 2014

Services
Preceding station	Adelaide Metro	Following station
Seaford Meadows towards Adelaide	Seaford line	Terminus
Location

Seaford railway station is the terminus of the Seaford line in South Australia. Situated in the southern Adelaide suburb of Seaford, it is 35.9 kilometres from Adelaide station.

== History ==
Seaford station opened on 23 February 2014 as part of the extension of the line from Noarlunga Centre. The line between Seaford Road and Griffiths Drive follows a similar alignment to the former Willunga railway line, and Seaford station is located approximately 300m from the site of the former Moana railway station, which is now housing.

The station is located between Griffiths Drive and Lynton Terrace and has two side platforms connected by an overhead walkway. It also functions as a bus interchange for the majority of bus services in this area, as well as providing a park & ride facility for approximately 450 vehicles and a kiss & ride area.

== Services by platform ==
Platform	Destination	Notes
1	Adelaide	Terminus
2	Adelaide	Not in regular use

== Transport links ==
Bus transfers: Stop Stand A (Seaford Interchange)
Route no.	Destination & route details
750	Sellicks Beach via Aldinga Shopping Centre
751	Aldinga Shopping Centre via McLaren Vale & Willunga
756	Port Willunga via McLaren Vale & Willunga

Bus transfers: Stop Stand B (Seaford Interchange)
Route no.	Destination & route details
741	Colonnades Shopping Centre via Port Noarlunga & Noarlunga Centre
741	Maslin Beach via Moana
745	Seaford Circuit anti-clockwise
747	Seaford Circuit clockwise
1252	Goolwa via Victor Harbor
1253	Goolwa via Victor Harbor
