= Port Noarlunga South, South Australia =

Port Noarlunga South
- Suburb
- Coordinates: 35.163490°S 138.4762°E
- Country: Australia
- State: South Australia
- Region: Southern Adelaide
- City: Adelaide
- LGA: City of Onkaparinga
- Location: 30 km (19 mi) from Adelaide
- Established: 1923

Government
  - State electorate: Kaurna
  - Federal division: Kingston

Population
  - Total: 3,058 (SAL 2021)
- Postcode: 5167
- County: Adelaide
- Mean max temp: 21.7 °C (71.1 °F)
- Mean min temp: 12.8 °C (55.0 °F)
- Annual rainfall: 448.7 mm (17.67 in)
Suburbs around Port Noarlunga South
Gulf St Vincent	Port Noarlunga	Noarlunga Downs
Gulf St Vincent	Port Noarlunga South	Noarlunga Downs; Seaford Meadows
Gulf St Vincent	Seaford	Seaford Meadows
- Adjoining suburbs Climate; Coordinates; Location

Port Noarlunga South is a suburb in the Australian state of South Australia located in the Adelaide metropolitan area on the coastline of Gulf St Vincent about 30 kilometres (19 miles) south of the state capital of Adelaide.

Port Noarlunga South started as a private sub-division in 1923 with portions gazetted with the names Paringa and Port Onkaparinga. A portion of land was added to the suburb in 1960 from an area known as Onkaparinga and was subsequently removed in 1995 to create the suburb of Seaford Meadows. In April 2001, the South Port Surf Life Saving Club submitted a proposal to rename parts of both the suburbs of Port Noarlunga and Port Noarlunga South as South Port. However, this proposal was withdrawn in August 2001 following discussions with the City of Onkaparinga regarding "locational identification issues " and replace with a request to "investigate the naming of South Port Beach."

Port Noarlunga South is bounded by the centre of the channel of the Onkaparinga River to the north, the coastline with Gulf St Vincent to the west, Aldam Road to the South and to the east by Commercial Road in part in the south, the centre of the Onkaparinga River in part and a line connecting both parts. Land use within the suburb consists of residential on its west side and 'open space' for land located within the Onkaparinga River Recreation Park on its east side.

Port Noarlunga South is located within the federal Division of Kingston, the state electoral district of Kaurna and the local government area of the City of Onkaparinga.

== Onkaparinga Community Playground ==
At the northern end of the suburb, there is a large community playground located on land bounded by Saltfeet Street to the west and the River Onkaparinga in the east. This is a community built playground and as such is unique to South Australia. The sum of A$250 000 was raised from community sponsorship before the playground was built using community labour over the period of 18–23 June 2002. This project began after research by "Living Neighbourhood" in the suburb of Christies Beach. There was a public meeting, after which a non-profit incorporated body was formed for the project. As of 2013, the City of Onkaparinga had not decided on an official name with the result that the following names are in use – Jubilee Park and A E Young Reserve names by the South Australian government and Adventure Playground in use by the local community.

== See also ==
- Noarlunga (disambiguation)
- History of Adelaide
- European settlement of South Australia
