= Seaford Heights, South Australia =

Seaford Heights
- Suburb
- Coordinates: 35.198°S 138.497°E
- Country: Australia
- State: South Australia
- Region: Southern Adelaide
- City: Adelaide
- LGA: City of Onkaparinga

Government
  - State electorate: Kaurna
  - Federal division: Kingston

Population
  - Total: 1,079 (SAL 2021)
- Postcode: 5169
- County: Adelaide
Suburbs around Seaford Heights
| Seaford | Old Noarlunga |
| Seaford Rise | Seaford Heights |
| | | McLaren Vale |

Seaford Heights is a metropolitan suburb of Adelaide, South Australia. It lies within the City of Onkaparinga and has postcode 5169. Its boundaries are formed by Robinson Road on the north, Main South Road on the west, Victor Harbor Road & Ostrich Farm Road on the east, and The Southern Waste Depot on the south. It covers 77 hectares.

Infrastructure development of Seaford Heights began in early 2014. The first permanent buildings (including an Aldi supermarket) were completed in late 2015. The Aldi supermarket opened in February 2016.

The development of Seaford Heights has gained considerable opposition. It is argued that the suburb represents unacceptable urban sprawl, infringing on The McLaren Vale wine region.

The Fairmont Group, an Australian property-development company, was given the tender in December 2008 to develop the property, and planned to start in late 2009. However, local opposition to the development stalled development for several years. Original plans called for 1,300 allotments and an approximate population of 4,500.

Some concerns have been raised with City of Onkaparinga council that the residential area will be sandwiched between two of Southern Adelaide's busiest arterial roads (Main South Road, Victor Harbor Road) and a dump (The Southern Waste Depot). Local opposition has also questioned placing a "strip mall" next to Adelaide's extensive grape fields.

== See also ==
- History of Adelaide
- European settlement of South Australia
