= Old Noarlunga, South Australia =

Old Noarlunga
- Suburb
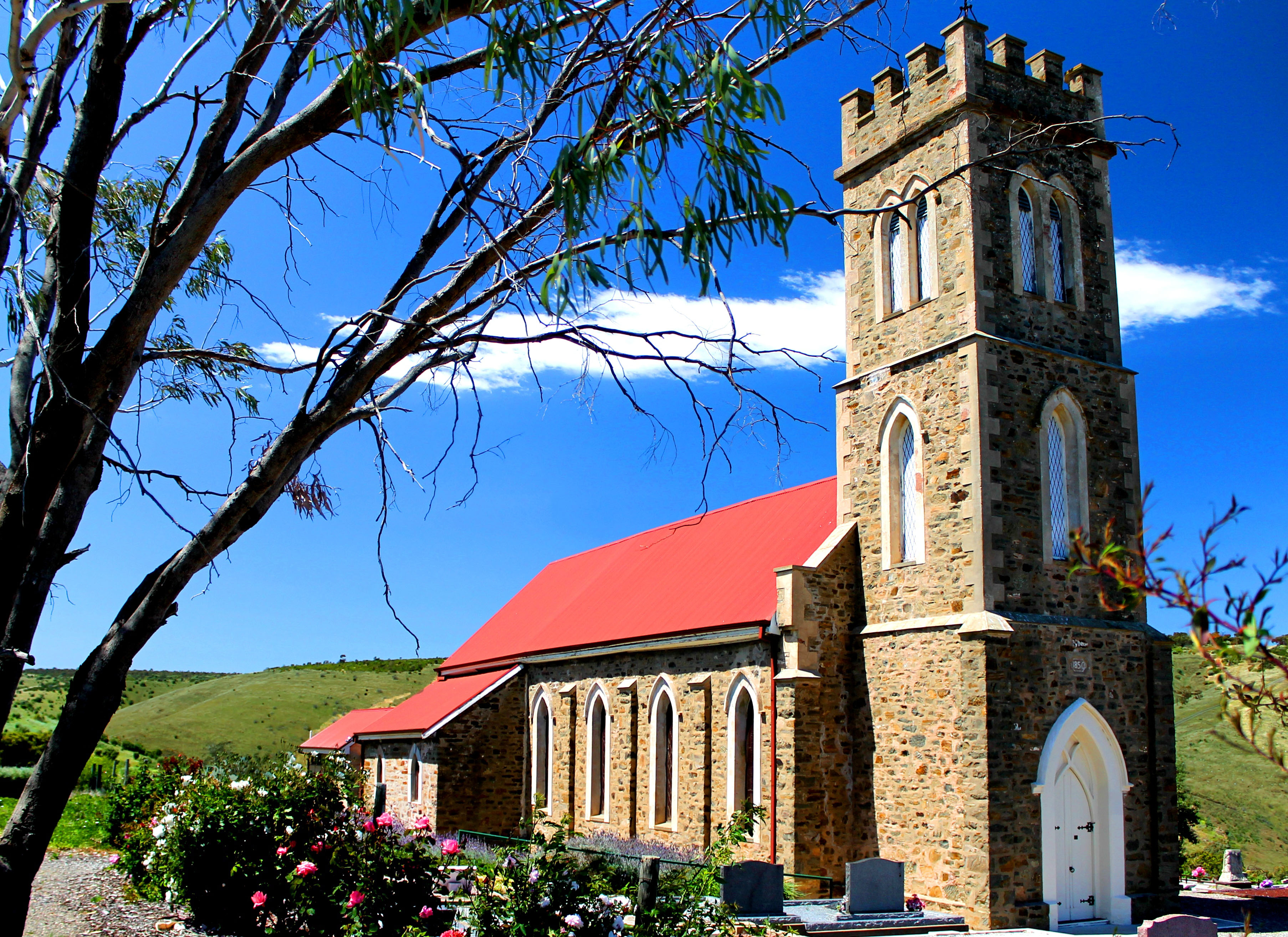
- Old Noarlunga Church

- Coordinates: 35.182480°S 138.501470°E
- Country: Australia
- State: South Australia
- Region: Southern Adelaide
- City: Adelaide
- LGA: City of Onkaparinga
- Location: 30 km (19 mi) from Adelaide
- Established: 1840

Government
  - State electorate: Kaurna
  - Federal divisions: Kingston; Mayo

Population
  - Total: 1,531 (SAL 2021)
- County: Adelaide
Suburbs around Old Noarlunga
Seaford Meadows	Seaford Meadows; Noarlunga Downs; Hackham	Onkaparinga Hills
Seaford	Old Noarlunga	Onkaparinga Hills; McLaren Vale
Seaford Rise	Seaford Heights; McLaren Vale	McLaren Vale
- Location; Coordinates; Adjoining suburbs

Old Noarlunga (formerly Noarlunga) is a suburb in the Australian state of South Australia located about 30 kilometres (19 mi) south of the state capital of Adelaide. Originally settled around 1840, the town retains its village atmosphere in spite of encroaching suburbia.

== Etymology ==
Contemporary Australian linguists believe the name 'Noarlunga' is derived from the Kaurna nurlo (corner/curve/bend) + ngga (place).

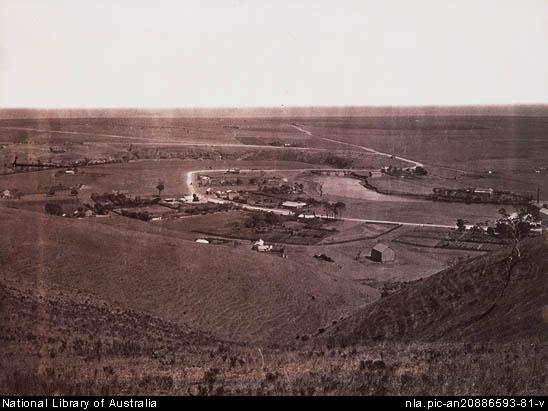
The Horseshoe, Old Noarlunga. Around 1869.

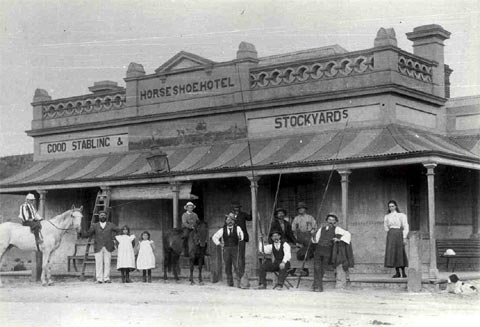
Horseshoe Inn, Old Noarlunga. 1865.

== History ==
In the early years of settlement, the surrounding area was cleared for wheat farming, and a flour mill was built in the town in 1843 along with wharves used to transport produce down the Onkaparinga River to Port Noarlunga via barge. The town still has a stone bridge across the Onkaparinga, making the town a focal point for travel further down the coast.

In 1846, the Hundred of Noarlunga land division was proclaimed, extending along the coast from the Sturt River to Onkaparinga, but named after the indigenous term nurlo (curve) for the horse-shoe bend of the Onkaparinga.

In 1850 the South Australia Company laid out the 'No-orlunga Township' at the 'Horseshoe', Onkaparinga River. 1856 saw the formation of the District Council of Noarlunga following residents on either side of the Onkaparinga. The new council was formed by excision of parts of both the District of Morphett Vale on the north bank and District Council of Willunga on the south bank.

By the 1860s the town had a post office, a council chamber, two churches, a public pound, two hotels, a mill, a brewery and a brickworks.

Old Noarlunga became a well known sporting venue, visited by cycling clubs and throughout the 20th century the town was a popular stopping point for tourists on the way to beaches in the region.

1972 saw Main South Road bypass the town and in 1978, by council resolution it became Old Noarlunga. Many local residents at the time were not in favour of the townships name change.

== See also ==
- Noarlunga (disambiguation)
