= Electoral district of Kaurna =

South Australian state electoral district

Kaurna South Australia—House of Assembly
- Interactive map of electoral district boundaries
- State: South Australia
- Created: 1993
- MP: Chris Picton
- Party: Labor
- Namesake: Kaurna people
- Electors: 26,254 (2018)
- Area: 44.69 km^{2} (17.3 sq mi)
- Demographic: Metropolitan
- Coordinates: 35°13′44″S 138°28′12″E
Electorates around Kaurna:
Gulf St Vincent	Reynell	Hurtle Vale
Gulf St Vincent	Kaurna	Hurtle Vale Mawson
Gulf St Vincent	Mawson	Mawson

Footnotes
- Electoral District map

Kaurna is a single-member electoral district for the South Australian House of Assembly. Named after the Kaurna aboriginal tribe which originally inhabited the Adelaide plains, it is a 44.7 km² semi-urban electorate on Adelaide's far-southern beaches, taking in the suburbs of Hackham, Huntfield Heights, Maslin Beach, Moana, Noarlunga Downs, Old Noarlunga, Port Noarlunga South, Seaford, Seaford Heights, Seaford Meadows and Seaford Rise, as well as part of Onkaparinga Hills. It is one of two state districts named after South Australia's indigenous people (the other being the electoral district of Narungga).

== History ==
Replacing the abolished seat of Baudin, Kaurna was created in the 1991 electoral distribution as a marginal Labor seat. It was first contested at the 1993 election, where it was won by Liberal candidate Lorraine Rosenberg as part of a large swing throughout the state. However, she was swept away at the 1997 election, with John Hill reclaiming the seat for Labor. For most of the time since then, it has been a fairly safe to safe Labor seat, as its predecessor Baudin had been for most of its existence.

John Hill resigned from parliament at the 2014 election, replaced by Labor's Chris Picton.

== Members for Kaurna ==
Member	Party	Term
Lorraine Rosenberg	Liberal	1993–1997
John Hill	Labor	1997–2014
Chris Picton	Labor	2014–present

== Election results ==
2026 South Australian state election: Kaurna
Party	Candidate	Votes	%	±%
Labor	Chris Picton	8,470	46.1	−9.8
One Nation	Zoe Jones	4,853	26.4	+18.4
Greens	Sean Weatherly	2,153	11.7	+0.8
Liberal	Shane Carter	1,461	8.0	−13.1
Family First	Amanda Brohier	479	2.6	−1.4
Legalise Cannabis	Gary Haddrell	431	2.4	+2.4
Real Change	Anastasios Manolakis	427	2.3	+2.3
Australian Family	Patrick Amadio	91	0.5	+0.5
Total formal votes		18,365	95.7	
Informal votes		835	4.3	
Turnout		19,200		
Two-party-preferred result
Labor	Chris Picton	11,530	62.8	−7.0
One Nation	Zoe Jones	6,835	37.2	+37.2
Labor hold		Swing	−7.0	

Results are not final. Last updated on 22 March at 12:35am ACDT.
