= Hackham West, South Australia =

Hackham West
- Suburb
- Country: Australia
- State: South Australia
- Region: Southern Adelaide
- City: Adelaide
- LGA: City of Onkaparinga
- Location: 25 km (16 mi) S of Adelaide city centre

Government
  - State electorate: Reynell
  - Federal division: Kingston (2011)

Population
  - Total: 3,620 (SAL 2021)
- Postcode: 5163
- County: Adelaide
Suburbs around Hackham West
Christie Downs	Morphett Vale	Morphett Vale
Noarlunga Centre, Noarlunga Downs	Hackham West	Hackham
Noarlunga Downs	Huntfield Heights	Hackham

Hackham West is an outer southern suburb of Adelaide, South Australia. It is located in the City of Onkaparinga.

== History ==
The suburb has existed for about thirty years. Prior to this, the area was rural with vineyards and farms.

On 4 January 1983 10-year-old Louise Bell, disappeared from her bedroom in Hackham West. On 11 November 2016, 68-year-old Dieter Pfennig was found guilty of murdering her. He was already serving a life sentence for murdering a boy in 1989 and the abduction and rape of another boy. Bells' body has not been located

== Geography ==
Hackham West lies between the Southern Expressway and Main South Road to the west and east, respectively. To the north, the suburb is bounded by Beach Road and Honeypot Road forms its southern boundary.

== Politics ==
=== Local government ===
Hackham West is part of Mid South Coast Ward in the City of Onkaparinga local government area, being represented in that council by William Jamieson, Chris Knight and Kym Richardson.

=== State and federal ===
Hackham West lies in the state electoral district of Reynell and the federal electoral division of Kingston.

== Community ==
The local newspaper is the Southern Times Messenger. Other regional and national newspapers such as The Advertiser and The Australian are also available.

=== Schools ===
Hackham West Primary School is located on Glynville Drive.

=== Community Centre ===
The Hackham West Community Centre been operating since 1982. The building itself is owned by the City of Onkaparinga, but the day-to-day management and activities of the centre are run by the residents of Hackham West. It is located on the corner of Majorca Road and Warsaw Crescent.

== Facilities and attractions ==
=== 1st Hackham Scout Group ===
Located on Roberts Road, 1st Hackham Scout Group has been running continuously since 1978. Through the years many children have been led by some great Joey, Cub and Scout Leaders. Many of these children have been represented at various Scout Jamborees around the country, and some have achieved the highest award of Queen Scout.

=== Parks ===
Several parks and other greenspaces intersperse the suburb. The largest reserve lies between Warsaw Crescent, Oslo Crescent and Amsterdam Road. There is a long, thin, park that runs from Beach Road to Honeypot Road broken only by Warsaw Road halfway along. Running from Amsterdam Road to Honepot Road is another park that is also connected by Olympia Crescent and Lieden Court. There is also a good size open space that can be accessed by Oslo Crescent, Bodo Court, and Hamar Court. Several of the parks are equipped with playground equipment and some offer picnic facilities.

== Transportation ==
=== Roads ===
Hackham West is serviced by Main South Road, connecting the suburb to the north and south of metropolitan Adelaide, and by Beach and Honeypot roads, which form its northern and southern boundaries respectively.

=== Public transport ===
Hackham West is serviced by a privately run bus company South Link which is publicly funded. The bus following services, 743 that runs seven days a week and 744 which runs a little over a handful of runs on Monday to Friday. It is part of the public transport system run by the Adelaide Metro. Hackham West was serviced by Hackham railway station on the old Willunga railway line. The station had a raised passenger platform during the passenger transport days of this line. However, the stop is now completely disused, the entire line having been dismantled in 1972 from Hallett Cove to Willunga.

=== Bicycle routes ===
A bicycle path extends north–south through the centre of the suburb, following the old railway line. There is also a bicycle path running beside the Southern Expressway.

== See also ==
- List of Adelaide suburbs
