= Seaford Meadows, South Australia =

Seaford Meadows
- Suburb
- Coordinates: 35.171590°S 138.487170°E
- Country: Australia
- State: South Australia
- City: Adelaide
- LGA: City of Onkaparinga
- Location: 30 km (19 mi) from Adelaide city centre
- Established: 1995

Government
  - State electorate: Kaurna
  - Federal division: Kingston

Population
  - Total: 5,102 (SAL 2021)
- Postcode: 5169
- Mean max temp: 21.7 °C (71.1 °F)
- Mean min temp: 12.8 °C (55.0 °F)
- Annual rainfall: 448.7 mm (17.67 in)
Suburbs around Seaford Meadows
Port Noarlunga South	Port Noarlunga South; Noarlunga Downs	Noarlunga Downs
Port Noarlunga South; Seaford	Seaford Meadows	Noarlunga Downs; Old Noarlunga
Seaford	Seaford; Old Noarlunga	Old Noarlunga
- coordinates Location; Climate; Adjoining suburbs

Seaford Meadows is a metropolitan suburb of Adelaide, South Australia. It lies within the City of Onkaparinga and has postcode 5169. A shopping centre with a Woolworths was opened in March 2014.

Seaford Meadows is located within the federal Division of Kingston, the state electoral district of Kaurna and the local government area of the City of Onkaparinga.

The Seaford railway line opened through Seaford Meadows in 2014. It is served by the Seaford Meadows railway station and is a major home to the Seaford Train Depot which is used to stable Adelaide Metro's 4000 class trains.

== See also ==
- Onkaparinga River Recreation Park
- History of Adelaide
- European settlement of South Australia
