= John F. Davis (artist) =

John Davis
- Born: John Francis Davis; 28 July 1958 (age 68); Adelaide, Australia
- Known for: Painting
- Spouse: Evelyn Roth (m. 2000)
- Website: johnsartmaslinbeach.com

John (Francis) Davis (born 28 July 1958) is an artist, who lives at Maslin Beach in South Australia. Davis is best known for his paintings of the Fleurieu Peninsula coastline. He is a caretaker of Maslin Beach for the Kaurna People.

== Biography ==
John Davis was born on July 28, 1958, in Adelaide, South Australia, of Indigenous Australian, Welsh, Spanish and German ancestry. He got his interest in art at very young age and sold his first painting at the age of 15 to a high school teacher (in 1973). Once he left school, painting was put onto the background, as he was working full-time. In 1998 John Davis decided he needed a new focus on life, and became a full-time painter. He married Evelyn Roth in 2000 in North America, near Vancouver, British Columbia. Evelyn is also an artist, worldwide known for her inflatables, wearable art and story telling events for children, and who has always been a great help in guidance and support for John.

John Davis lives at Maslin Beach in the City of Onkaparinga with his wife Evelyn.

== Influences ==
John Davis is a self-taught painter, not particularly influenced by any style, but with a deep interest in surrealism, abstract art, and native art from around the world.

== Environment ==
John Davis is involved in environmental projects, locally e.g. with the Red Ochre at the City of Onkaparinga coast line near Maslin Beach, and globally e.g. with global warming and the effects on ice caps and wildlife.

In 2008, Gregory Hemmings, environmentalist, writer and movie maker, organised a sailing ship expedition Around North America, to highlight the environmental issues. John Davis was asked to be the ship's on board artist, but he declined as he did not feel like a sailing person. As an alternative some of John's work featuring polar bears and one of Evelyn Roth's inflatable salmons were part of that journey. It was meant to be a 2-year voyage starting at Tromsø in Norway, sailing down the West coast of North America, through the Panama Canal then up the east coast, and ending back in Tromsø. The expedition ended after 12 months, taking half of the planned time for the trip.
