= William Henry Shephard =

William Henry Shephard (c. 1812 – 29 June 1848) was an early colonist of South Australia.

The son of a lawyer, Shephard arrived at Port Adelaide on the privately chartered Tam o' Shanter (which rather ignominiously got stuck on the mud flats) in 1836. Thomas Maslin (for whom Maslins Beach is named) was a fellow emigrant and later his brother-in-law.

He opened the "Adelaide Tavern" on Franklin Street, near the present Rosetta Terrace, with a theatre upstairs capable of holding 400 people. It was at this inn that a reception was held for Colonel Light on 6 June 1838 with 250 invited guests.

He sold the Tavern in March 1839, when it became the "Adelaide and Port Lincoln Hotel", and was later that same year renamed "Allen's Hotel". He settled on his property "Windsor Farm" at Sturt Hills (possibly now Eden Hills?).

He died of tuberculosis at the age of 36.

His son William Thomas Shephard worked the land for his mother, and (using Thomas Maslin as a "dummy" or proxy because of his age) bought land "Brush Yards" near Woodside. His other son William Henry jun., founded a sheep station at Waikerie, South Australia and a wheelwright's shop near Darlington.

== Recognition ==
Shephard's Hill Road (now Shepherds Hill Road) was named for him.

== Family ==
He married Ann Garrett at Holy Trinity Church on 4 June 1838. They had three surviving children:

- William Thomas Shephard (c. 1842 – 27 Nov 1912) married Elizabeth Ann Hopkins (c. 1845 – 14 April 1880), died in childbirth.
- William Henry Shephard jun. (29 Aug 1847 – 28 May 1894)
- Ann Elizabeth Shephard (26 Dec 1839 – 14 May 1927) married Thomas Richards on 19 March 1862
