= McLaren Vale, South Australia =

McLaren Vale
- Town
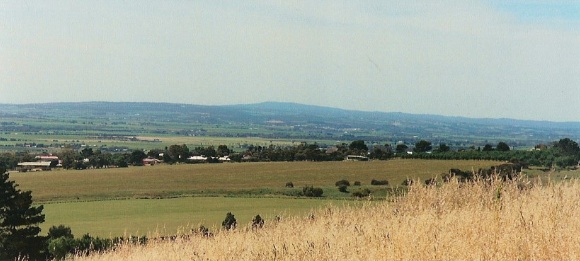

- Coordinates: 35°13′11″S 138°32′28″E
- Country: Australia
- State: South Australia
- Region: Southern Adelaide
- LGA: City of Onkaparinga
- Location: 33 km (21 mi) S of Adelaide; 9 km (5.6 mi) S of Noarlunga Centre
- Established: 1838; 13 July 1995 (locality)

Government
  - State electorate: Mawson
  - Federal division: Mayo

Area
  - Total: 3.9 km^{2} (1.5 sq mi)

Population
  - Total: 3,277 (UCL 2021)
- Time zone: UTC+9:30 (ACST)
  - Summer (DST): UTC+10:30 (ACST)
- Postcode: 5171
- County: Adelaide
- Mean max temp: 21.7 °C (71.1 °F)
- Mean min temp: 12.8 °C (55.0 °F)
- Annual rainfall: 448.4 mm (17.65 in)
Localities around McLaren Vale
Old Noarlunga	Onkaparinga Hills	Onkaparinga Hills
Old Noarlunga; Seaford Heights; Seaford Rise; Maslin Beach	McLaren Vale	Blewitt Springs; McLaren Flat; The Range; Tatachilla
Whites Valley	Willunga	Willunga
- Locations; Adjoining localities

McLaren Vale is a town and locality in the Australian state of South Australia located about 33 kilometres (21 mi) south of the Adelaide city centre and about 9 kilometres (5.6 mi) south of the municipal seat at Noarlunga Centre. The town and its locality are located within the McLaren Vale wine region.

== History ==
The township was formed in 1923 from a merging of the two original villages of Gloucester and Bellevue, which were established in the 1840s. Boundaries for the locality were defined on 13 July 1995 for the portion within the former City of Noarlunga with the portion in the former District Council of Willunga being added on 28 January 1999. Land within the former locality of Landcross Farm was added on 16 March 2000.

The source of the name has been attributed by several writers to either David McLaren of the South Australian Company or John McLaren of the colonial government's Land Office. Geoff Manning, a South Australian historian, investigated this matter and found that the latter person is the namesake.

South of Noarlunga the country along the coast (Aldinga Plains) is more thinly settled chiefly in consequence of a want of water. At two miles from the township, however, the traveller enters upon the extensive and rich valley of McLaren, named from Mr McLaren, Land Office, who surveyed it and most of the southern districts.

— The Country in South Australia, The South Australian, 7 October 1845

The name is linked to the motor racing world via Ben Howie, a former resident who decided to change his surname to that of his hometown when relocating to New Zealand; his descendents included Bruce McLaren, founder of the successful McLaren team in Formula 1.

== Geography and demographics ==
McLaren Vale is located within the federal division of Mayo, the state electoral district of Mawson and the local government area of the City of Onkaparinga.

At the 2016 census, the locality of McLaren Vale had a population of 3,842 and a median age of 52 of which 3,096 lived in its town centre.

Rural Junction Active Warning Systems (RJAWS) have been implemented in McLaren Vale.
