= Reynella, South Australia =

Reynella
- Suburb
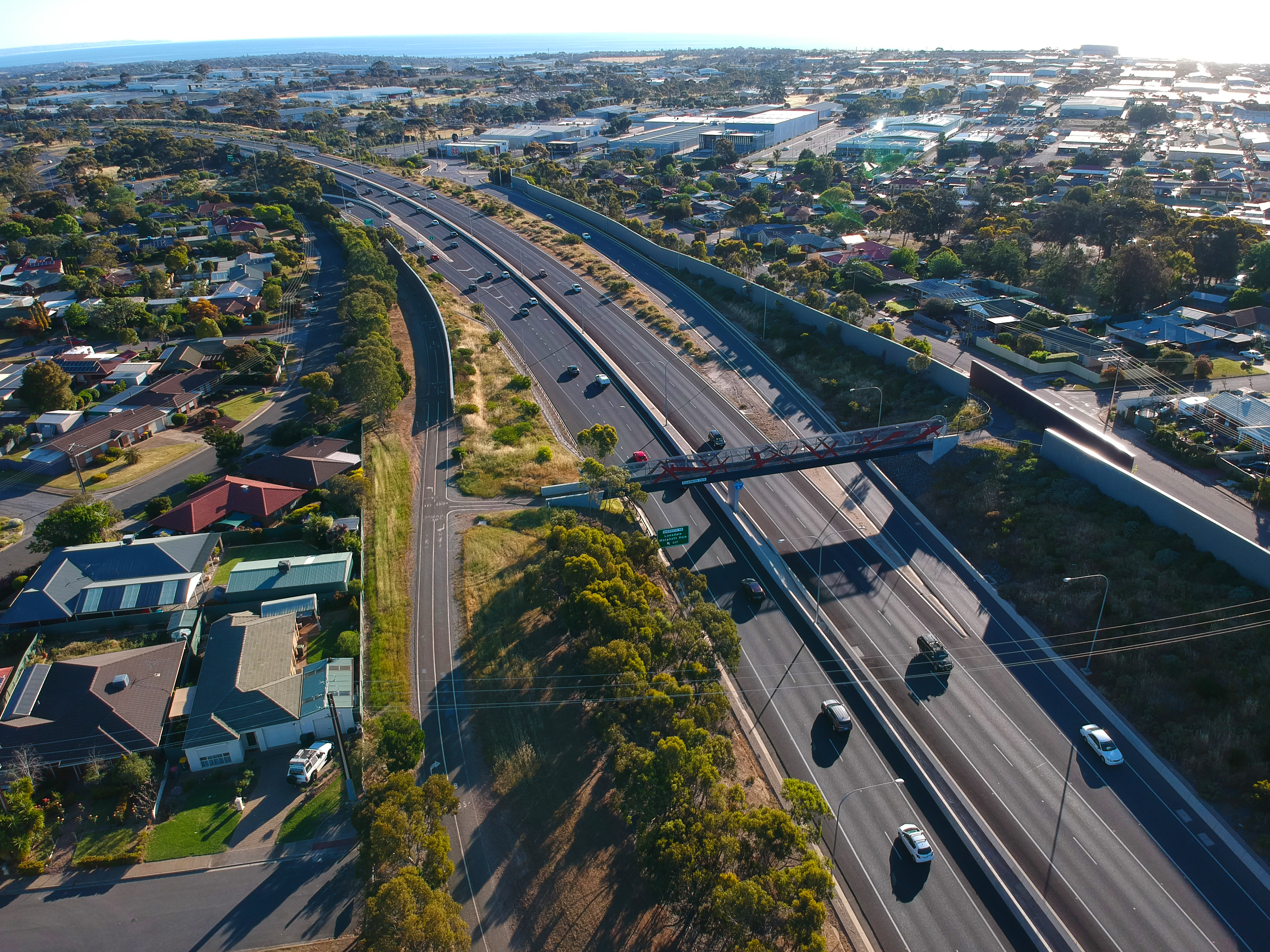
- Moore Road Park, Reynella aerial, 2019

- Country: Australia
- State: South Australia
- Region: Southern Adelaide
- City: Adelaide
- LGA: City of Onkaparinga
- Established: 1840

Government
  - State electorate: Reynell
  - Federal division: Kingston

Population
  - Total: 4,836 (SAL 2021)
- Postcode: 5161
- County: Adelaide
Suburbs around Reynella
Hallett Cove	Sheidow Park	Trott Park
	Reynella	Old Reynella
Lonsdale	Morphett Vale

Reynella is a metropolitan suburb of Adelaide, South Australia.

It is located 20 km south of the Central Business District of Adelaide in the north of the City of Onkaparinga. It is bordered to the east by Main South Road, to the south by Sherriffs Road, and to the north by Field River.

Reynella was divided into three smaller suburbs: Reynella, Old Reynella (the historical centre of the district) and Reynella East.

Reynella is in the South Australian districts of Mawson and Mitchell.

== History ==
Reynella Post Office opened on 5 September 1856. A Reynella South office opened in 1963 and closed in 1969.

== Transport ==
Reynella is primary serviced by buses on the Adelaide Metro network.

It is serviced primarily by South Road, Sheriffs Road exits on the Southern Expressway and Young Street.

== Landmarks ==
An unusual landmark in Reynella is what has become known colloquially as Junk Food Junction or Junk Food Corner. At a time when the fast food market was less saturated, the intersection of South Road, Adelaide and Pimpala Road had all four major fast food outlets.

== Shopping ==
Reynella is situated close to a small shopping precinct in Southgate Plaza. Westfield Marion and Centro Colonnades are the larger shopping complexes servicing the area.

== Notable people ==
Notable people from or who lived in Reynella include:

- Ann Woolcock, physician and asthma expert
- James Gilbert Woolcock, metallurgist, mining consultant, mining engineer
