= Huntfield Heights, South Australia =

Huntfield Heights
- Suburb
- Country: Australia
- State: South Australia
- Region: Southern Adelaide
- City: Adelaide
- LGA: City of Onkaparinga

Government
  - State electorate: Kaurna
  - Federal division: Kingston

Population
  - Total: 4,199 (SAL 2021)
- Postcode: 5163
- County: Adelaide
Suburbs around Huntfield Heights
Noarlunga Downs	Hackham West	Hackham
Noarlunga Downs	Huntfield Heights	Hackham
Noarlunga Downs	Hackham	Hackham

Huntfield Heights is a metropolitan suburb of Adelaide, South Australia. It lies within the City of Onkaparinga and has postcode 5163. The borders of this suburb are Honeypot Road to the north, Main South Road marks the eastern and the southern border, and the Southern Expressway marks the most westerly border. Huntfield Heights used to be the southern half of Hackham West. In the late 1990s it was renamed, after former Noarlunga mayor Walter Morris Hunt.

== See also ==
- History of Adelaide
- European settlement of South Australia
