= Rural Junction Active Warning System =

Road safety system in South Australia

The Rural Junction Active Warning System (RJAWS) is a road safety technology developed and deployed in South Australia to enhance safety at high-speed rural intersections. It uses vehicle detection sensors to activate warning signs, alerting drivers on the main road to the presence of approaching vehicles from side roads, thereby reducing the risk of collisions. The system is particularly aimed at intersections with limited visibility or high crash histories, aligning with the Safe System approach to road safety.

RJAWS was developed through collaboration between the South Australian Department for Infrastructure and Transport (DIT) and the Centre for Automotive Safety Research (CASR) at the University of Adelaide. It has been trialled and implemented at various rural sites, with evaluations indicating reductions in vehicle speeds and crash severity.

== History and development ==
The development of RJAWS began in response to the high incidence of fatal and serious injury crashes at rural intersections in South Australia, where side-road vehicles often intersect with high-speed main roads. Initial trials were funded by DIT's Annual Program, with a $500,000 investment announced in 2018.

The system evolved from earlier concepts, incorporating radar or inductive loop sensors for vehicle detection. A lower-cost variant, RJAWS Lite, was introduced to suit regional and remote areas, utilizing solar power, mobile network communications, and radar detection to minimize installation costs and complexity. RJAWS Lite includes features like flashing advisory signs on the main road and run-through avoidance alerts on minor roads.

By 2022, preliminary evaluations had been conducted, showing potential for crash reduction.

== Design and operation ==
RJAWS operates by detecting vehicles approaching from minor roads using radar or embedded sensors. Upon detection, it activates electronic signs on the main road approaches, which may display flashing warnings, reduced speed limits (e.g., from 100 km/h to 80 km/h), or advisory messages like "Slow Down."

The RJAWS Lite version emphasizes affordability, with off-grid solar power and wireless communications, making it suitable for remote installations. It provides two main functions: main road speed advisories via flashing lights and minor road alerts to prevent overshooting the intersection.

The system is designed to improve safe intersection sight distance (SISD) and reduce reaction times, thereby lowering crash likelihood and severity.

== Installations ==
RJAWS has been installed at several high-risk rural intersections in South Australia. Initial trials in 2018 included sites such as the junctions of Cudlee Creek Road and Fox Creek Road, McLaren Flat Road and Baker Gully Road, Bull Creek Road and Paris Creek Road, and Horrocks Highway and Stradbrooke Road.

=== McLaren Vale example ===
In McLaren Vale, RJAWS was deployed as part of a broader $4.98 million project to upgrade 21 intersections, funded by the South Australian Government and managed by the City of Onkaparinga. A notable installation occurred at the intersection of Chalk Hill Road, Olivers Road, and Field Street in October 2022. The system used radar-activated flashing warning lights to alert main road drivers to side-road vehicles, addressing a history of overshooting incidents.

By 2024, additional RJAWS units were installed at intersections like Communication Road and Bayliss Road as part of the ongoing upgrades. The Chalk Hill Road site was later decommissioned to make way for a roundabout, with the equipment relocated to another location.

== Effectiveness ==
Evaluations by CASR have demonstrated that RJAWS reduces approach speeds on main roads by up to 10-15 km/h when activated, leading to lower crash risks. A 2021 study found potential reductions in casualty crashes at treated sites. Trials across four rural intersections showed remarkable results, including decreased fatal and serious injuries.

The system's alignment with IoT technology has been noted for its role in improving rural road safety.

== Similar systems internationally ==
RJAWS shares similarities with systems in other countries. In New Zealand, the Rural Intersection Active Warning System (RIAWS) uses variable speed limits and has shown up to 71% crash reductions at trial sites.

In the United States, the Rural Intersection Conflict Warning System (RICWS) has been deployed in states like Minnesota, providing real-time warnings at thru-STOP intersections. Evaluations have shown mixed results, with some sites experiencing limited crash reductions.
