= Emerson Crossing =

Coordinates: 34°58′2.2″S 138°34′22.6″E

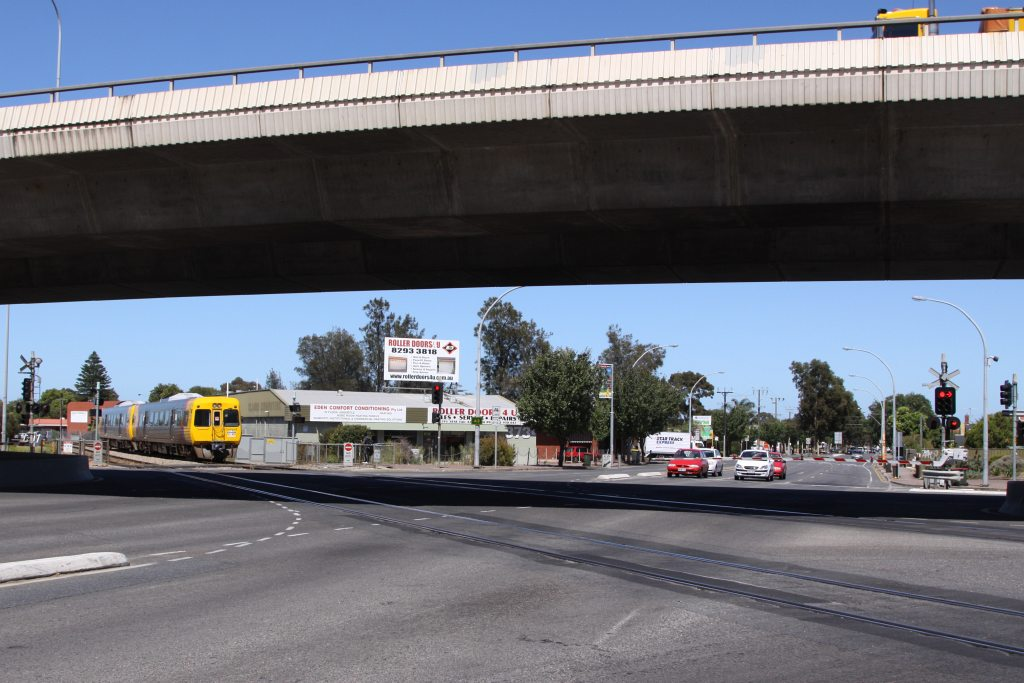
Looking west on Cross Road as a 3000 class railcar proceeds through the level crossing in 2011. The South Road Overpass is overhead.

Emerson Crossing, also known as the South Road Overpass (or simply the Overpass) are the informal names given to the intersection of South Road, Cross Road and the Seaford railway line in Adelaide, South Australia. South Road crosses north–south over both Cross Road and the diagonal railway via a large bridge built in the early 1980s. This was done in an attempt to cater for the ever increasing amount of traffic which went through the intersection and was constantly congested during peak hour times. Emerson railway station is located in the north eastern corner of the crossing. The station and crossing are both named after Emerson Street, a small dead end road just north of the intersection along South Road, in the suburb of Black Forest.

The grade separation at Emerson Crossing is by a 3-span bridge. The centre span is 40 metres (130 ft), with a 31.2 metres (102 ft) span each end. The abutments and embankments were constructed using the reinforced earth system and completed in 1983. The main bridge work was awarded to Baulderstone. It was commenced in January 1984 and was completed in 13 months.

The overpass was designed by the Highways Department of South Australia. It incorporates Texas U-turn facilities. It was officially opened jointly by John Bannon (the Premier of South Australia) and Peter Morris (the Federal Minister of Transport) on 14 March 1985.
