= Noarlunga Downs, South Australia =

Noarlunga Downs
- Suburb
- Coordinates: 35.1562°S 138.499270°E
- Country: Australia
- State: South Australia
- Region: Southern Adelaide
- LGA: City of Onkaparinga
- Established: 1978

Government
  - State electorate: Kaurna
  - Federal division: Kingston

Population
  - Total: 4,031 (SAL 2021)
- Postcode: 5168
- County: Adelaide
Suburbs around Noarlunga Downs
Christies Beach	Christie Downs	Morphett Vale
Port Noarlunga	Noarlunga Downs	Hackham West
Seaford Meadows	Old Noarlunga	Huntfield Heights
- Coordinates; Adjoining suburbs

Noarlunga Downs is a metropolitan suburb of Adelaide, South Australia. It lies within the City of Onkaparinga and has postcode 5168.

== Facilities ==
The suburb is the home of Magain Stadium, the home ground of the South Adelaide Football Club, who play in the South Australian National Football League (SANFL). The oval was officially opened as Noarlunga Oval in 1995. It has a spectator capacity of 12,000 and includes television standard lights for night games. The Panthers Club also houses entertainment, bar, gaming and restaurant facilities.

The Catholic Church in the suburb is dedicated to Saint Luke.

== See also ==
- Noarlunga (disambiguation)
- European settlement of South Australia
- History of Adelaide
- Onkaparinga River Recreation Park
