= Blewitt Springs, South Australia =

Blewitt Springs
- Suburb
- Country: Australia
- State: South Australia
- Region: Southern Adelaide
- City: Adelaide
- LGA: City of Onkaparinga

Government
  - State electorate: Heysen
  - Federal division: Mayo

Population
  - Total: 346 (SAL 2021)
- Postcode: 5171
- County: Adelaide
Suburbs around Blewitt Springs
Onkaparinga Hills	Clarendon
McLaren Vale	Blewitt Springs	Kangarilla
	McLaren Flat

Blewitt Springs is a semi-rural suburb of Adelaide, South Australia. It is within the City of Onkaparinga.

== See also ==
- European settlement of South Australia
