= City of Onkaparinga =

Coordinates: 34°55′S 138°38′E

- Local government area
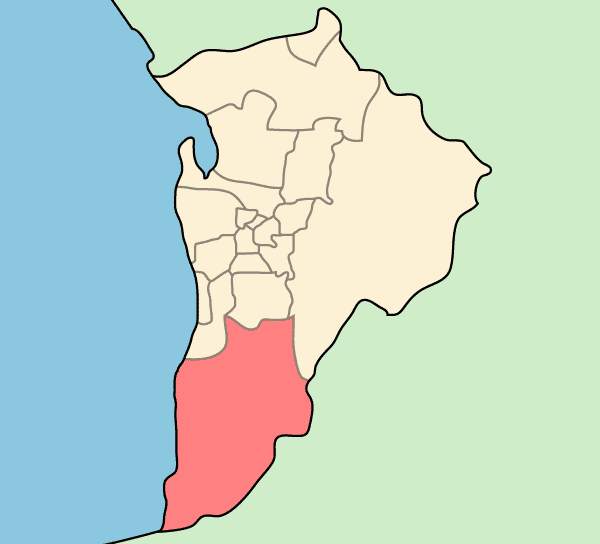

- Interactive map of City of Onkaparinga
- Country: Australia
- State: South Australia
- Region: Southern Adelaide
- Established: 6 March 1997
- Council seat: Noarlunga Centre

Government
  - Mayor: Moira Were AM
  - State electorate: Davenport, Finniss, Fisher, Heysen, Kaurna, Mawson, Mitchell, Reynell
  - Federal division: Kingston, Mayo

Area
  - Total: 518.4 km^{2} (200.2 sq mi)

Population
  - Total: 175,204 (LGA 2021)
  - Density: 338/km^{2} (880/sq mi)
- County: Adelaide
- Website: City of Onkaparinga
LGAs around City of Onkaparinga
City of Marion	City of Mitcham	Adelaide Hills Council
	City of Onkaparinga	District Council of Mount Barker
District Council of Yankalilla	District Council of Yankalilla	Alexandrina Council

The City of Onkaparinga (/ˌɒŋkəpəˈrɪŋɡə/) is a local government area (LGA) located on the southern fringe of Adelaide, South Australia. It is named after the Onkaparinga River, whose name comes from Ngangkiparinga, a Kaurna word meaning women's river. It is the largest LGA in South Australia, with a population of over 170,000 people in both urban and rural communities and is also geographically expansive, encompassing an area of 518.3 km^{2}. The council is headquartered in the Noarlunga Centre with area offices situated in Aberfoyle Park, Woodcroft and Willunga.

== History ==
The council was formed on 1 July 1997 as the City of Happy Valley, Noarlunga and Willunga from the amalgamation of the former City of Happy Valley and City of Noarlunga with part of the District Council of Willunga. It adopted the City of Onkaparinga name from 22 December 1997.

=== Mayors ===
- 1997–2006: Ray Gilbert
- 2006–2018: Lorraine Rosenberg
- 2018–2022: Erin Thompson
- 2022 (acting): Simon McMahon
- 2022–present: Moira Were

== Culture ==
The South Australian Writers' Centre and the City of Onkaparinga co-hosted the biennial South Australian Writers' Festival (2001–2011), renamed the South Australian Readers' and Writers' Festival from 2013 to 2015.

== Demographics ==
Selected historical census data for Onkaparinga local government area
Census year		2001	2006	2011	2016
Population	Estimated residents on census night	143,143	144,407	159,576	166,766
Population	LGA rank in terms of size within South Australia		1st	1st	1st
Population	% of South Australia population	9.81%	▼9.54%	▲10.00%	▼9.95%
Population	% of Australian population	0.76%	▼0.73%	▲0.74%	▼0.71%
Cultural and language diversity					
Ancestry, top responses	English			35.4%	▼34.9%
Ancestry, top responses	Australian			28.9%	▼27.4%
Ancestry, top responses	Scottish			6.8%	▲7.0%
Ancestry, top responses	Irish			5.8%	▲6.3%
Ancestry, top responses	German			5.3%	5.3%
Language, top responses (other than English)	Polish	0.7%	▼0.5%	▼0.4%	0.4%
Language, top responses (other than English)	German	0.7%	▼0.6%	▼0.5%	0.5%
Language, top responses (other than English)	Italian	0.6%	▼0.5%	0.5%	▼0.4%
Language, top responses (other than English)	Greek	0.5%	0.5%	▼0.4%	0.4%
Language, top responses (other than English)	Dutch	0.43%	▼0.3%		
Language, top responses (other than English)	Arabic			0.3%	
Language, top responses (other than English)	Mandarin				0.5%
Religious affiliation					
Religious affiliation, top responses	No religion	25.5%	▲29.6%	▲34.5%	▲43.1%
Religious affiliation, top responses	Anglican	17.6%	▼15.9%	▼15.0%	▼11.6%
Religious affiliation, top responses	Catholic	16.2%	▼15.6%	▼15.5%	▼13.9%
Religious affiliation, top responses	Uniting	10.3%	▼9.2%	▼8.4%	▼6.5%
Religious affiliation, top responses	Lutheran	3.1%	▼3.0%		
Median weekly incomes					
Personal income	Median weekly personal income		A$439	A$542	A$593
Personal income	% of Australian median income		98.4%	93.9%	95.3%
Family income	Median weekly family income		A$1088	A$1311	A$1448
Family income	% of Australian median income		92.9%	88.5%	83.5%
Household income	Median weekly household income		A$922	A$1080	A$1194
Household income	% of Australian median income		89.8%	87.5%	83.0%

== Governance ==
Diagram of Onkaparinga's council: Independent: 10 seats Independent Labor: 1 seat Independent Liberal: 1 seat

Map of Onkaparinga by wards: Southern Vales ward Thalassa ward Pimpala ward South Coast ward Mid Coast ward Knox ward

Results of the 2022 South Australian local elections in Onkaparinga: Independents (10) Independent Labor (1) Independent Liberal (1)

The council meets at the chambers in Noarlunga Centre on Hannah Road once a month on a Tuesday at 6.30pm.

The City of Onkaparinga has 13 elected members (including the mayor). The city is divided into six electoral wards, with two councillors representing each. The mayor is elected at large by all electors.

The current council was elected in 2022 for a four-year term.

Ward	Party	Councillor	Notes
Mayor	Labor	Moira Were AM	
Knox	Independent	Cr Heidi Greaves	
Knox	Independent	Cr Colt Stafford	
Mid Coast	Independent	Cr Dan Platten (Deputy Mayor)	
Mid Coast	Independent	Cr Gretel Wilkes	
Pimpala	Independent	Cr Kim Davis	
Pimpala	Independent	Cr Michael Fisher	
South Coast	Independent	Cr Lauren Jew	
South Coast	Independent	Cr Paul Yeomans	
Southern Vales Coast	Labor	Cr Marisa Bell	
Southern Vales Coast	Independent	Cr Jordan Pritchard	
Thalassa	Independent	Cr Geoff Eaton	
Thalassa	Liberal	Cr Marion Themeliotis	

== Suburbs ==
- Aberfoyle Park - 5159
- Aldinga - 5173
- Aldinga Beach – 5173
- Blewitt Springs - 5171
- Chandlers Hill - 5159
- Cherry Gardens - 5157
- Christie Downs - 5164
- Christies Beach - 5165
- Clarendon – 5157
- Coromandel East - 5157
- Coromandel Valley - 5051
- Darlington - 5047
- Dorset Vale - 5157
- Flagstaff Hill - 5159
- Hackham - 5163
- Hackham West - 5163
- Happy Valley - 5159
- Huntfield Heights - 5163
- Ironbank - 5153
- Kangarilla - 5157
- Kuitpo (part) - 5201
- Lonsdale - 5160
- Maslin Beach - 5170
- McLaren Flat - 5171
- McLaren Vale - 5171
- Moana - 5169
- Morphett Vale – 5162
- Noarlunga Centre - 5168
- Noarlunga Downs - 5168
- O'Halloran Hill - 5158
- O'Sullivan Beach - 5166
- Old Noarlunga - 5168
- Old Reynella - 5161
- Onkaparinga Heights - 5163
- Onkaparinga Hills - 5163
- Port Noarlunga – 5167
- Port Noarlunga South - 5167
- Port Willunga - 5173
- Reynella - 5161
- Reynella East - 5161
- Seaford - 5169
- Seaford Heights - 5169
- Seaford Meadows - 5169
- Seaford Rise - 5169
- Sellicks Beach - 5174
- Sellicks Hill - 5174
- Tatachilla - 5171
- The Range - 5172
- Whites Valley - 5172
- Willunga - 5172
- Willunga South - 5172
- Woodcroft – 5162

That is, postcodes 5047, 5051, 5153, and 5157–74 (inclusive).

== Freedom of the City ==
The Freedom of the City is reserved for military units which have, through their command, a significant attachment to the City of Onkaparinga. Freedom of the City is the highest honour the City can confer on a military unit.

=== Recipients ===
Three military units have been awarded Freedom of the City:

- 1998 - 40th Regional Cadet Unit Noarlunga
- 2004 - Squadron 605 Australian Air Force Cadets and Australian Navy Cadets TS Noarlunga
- 2016 - 619 Squadron, Australian Air Force Cadets

== Key to the City ==
The Key to the City recognises exceptional, outstanding achievement and is Council’s most prestigious award. The award acknowledges the outstanding contribution of an individual or organisation in furthering the ideals of the city or to recognise outstanding achievement.

=== Recipients ===
- 1998 - Dr Andrew "Andy" Sydney Withiel Thomas AO
- 2006 - Mayor Ray Gilbert OAM JP & Edith Gilbert JP
- 2019 - Richard "Richie" Julian Porte

== See also ==
- Local Government Areas of South Australia
- List of Adelaide suburbs
- List of Adelaide parks and gardens
