= Seaford, South Australia =

Seaford
- Suburb
- Coordinates: 35.186710°S 138.476210°E
- Country: Australia
- State: South Australia
- Region: Southern Adelaide
- LGA: City of Onkaparinga
- Location: 32 km (20 mi) from Adelaide
- Established: 1960

Government
  - State electorate: Kaurna
  - Federal division: Kingston

Population
  - Total: 4,493 (SAL 2021)
- Postcode: 5169
- County: Adelaide
- Mean max temp: 21.7 °C (71.1 °F)
- Mean min temp: 12.8 °C (55.0 °F)
- Annual rainfall: 448.7 mm (17.67 in)
Suburbs around Seaford
Gulf St Vincent	Port Noarlunga South	Seaford Meadows
Gulf St Vincent	Seaford	Old Noarlunga
Gulf St Vincent	Moana; Seaford Rise	Seaford Heights
- Location; Climate; Adjoining suburbs

Seaford is a metropolitan suburb of Adelaide, South Australia. It lies within the City of Onkaparinga. Seaford railway station is the southern terminus of the Seaford railway line from Adelaide railway station.

Seaford is a popular surfing beach due to its accessibility from Adelaide and on public transport via the train line. Seaford Shopping Centre, between the train and beach, is the retail and commercial hub for the area. Facilities elsewhere including schools, medical clinics, bakeries, recreation, sports and community centres, parks and playgrounds make it a walkable coastal neighbourhood that attracts many families.

As the population of the suburb has expanded, the Seaford Boardriders club has grown in prominence and success, winning various titles, with older surfers long associated with the area sharing knowledge with emerging generations.

== History ==
Seaford, a coastal suburb to the near south of Port Noarlunga, was set out on Sections 334 and 340, Hundred of Noarlunga, in 1954 by the Wakefield Land Company Pty Ltd. To the west of the horseshoe in the Onkaparinga River at Noarlunga, the land was first settled in the farming boom of the 1810s and 1820s.

Seaford was also the site, in the nineteenth century, of the Southern Race Course. The pursuit of horse racing and other sports, like hunting and ploughing matches, was an important part of the local social life.

During the mid-twentieth century, numerous land developments resulted from the movement of suburban population to the south of Adelaide and the rise of tourism along the beaches.

Seaford Post Office opened on 9 June 1992 replacing the nearby Moana office.
