= Seaford Rise, South Australia =

Coordinates: 35°12′07″S 138°29′17″E

Seaford Rise
- Suburb
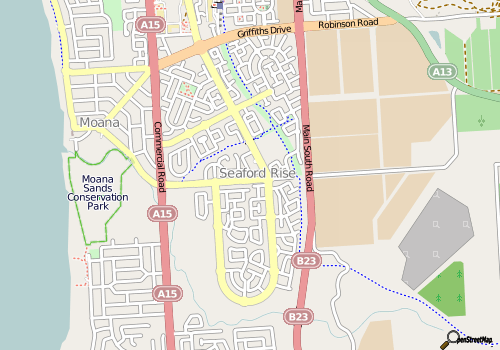
- Country: Australia
- State: South Australia
- Region: Southern Adelaide
- City: Adelaide
- LGA: City of Onkaparinga

Population
  - Total: 6,105 (SAL 2021)
- Postcode: 5169
- County: Adelaide
Suburbs around Seaford Rise
| Seaford | Seaford | Old Noarlunga |
| Moana | Seaford Rise | Seaford Heights |
| Maslin Beach | Maslin Beach | Tatachilla |

Seaford Rise is a metropolitan suburb of Adelaide, South Australia. It lies within the City of Onkaparinga. Its boundaries are formed by Griffiths Drive in the north, Commercial Road in the west, Main South Road in the east, and by an arbitrary border with Maslin Beach in the south.

== History ==
Situated on former farming land it is south-west of the horseshoe in the Onkaparinga River at Noarlunga – land first settled in the farming boom of the 1840s and 1850s.

At first, agriculture prospered and early European settlers quickly cleared native vegetation and planted cereal crops. Initially, wheat was the mainstay of the area. The success of the first two decades of farming was mirrored in the construction of a flour mill at nearby Old Noarlunga and of the growth of that town.

Those who farmed the land now contained at and near Seaford Rise included the Teakle, Robinson, Jared, Oliver and Martin families. These people, and others like them, learned that reliance on wheat alone was fraught with danger – by the late 1860s, land was worn out from constant cropping and yields had dropped to low levels. The system of farming, therefore, altered to a mixed form including sheep, poultry, small dairies and a diversity of cereal crops. The pattern proved to be profitable enough for farmers to survive on relatively small parcels of land – at least for a time.

While this form of farming continued for nearly one hundred years, by the mid-twentieth century, there were numerous land developments. This resulted from the movement of suburban population to the south of Adelaide and the rise of tourism along the beaches.

Agriculture dropped by the wayside as Government and private developers set aside land for urban expansion.
