= Maslin Beach, South Australia =

Southern coastal suburb of Adelaide, South Australia

Maslin Beach
- Suburb
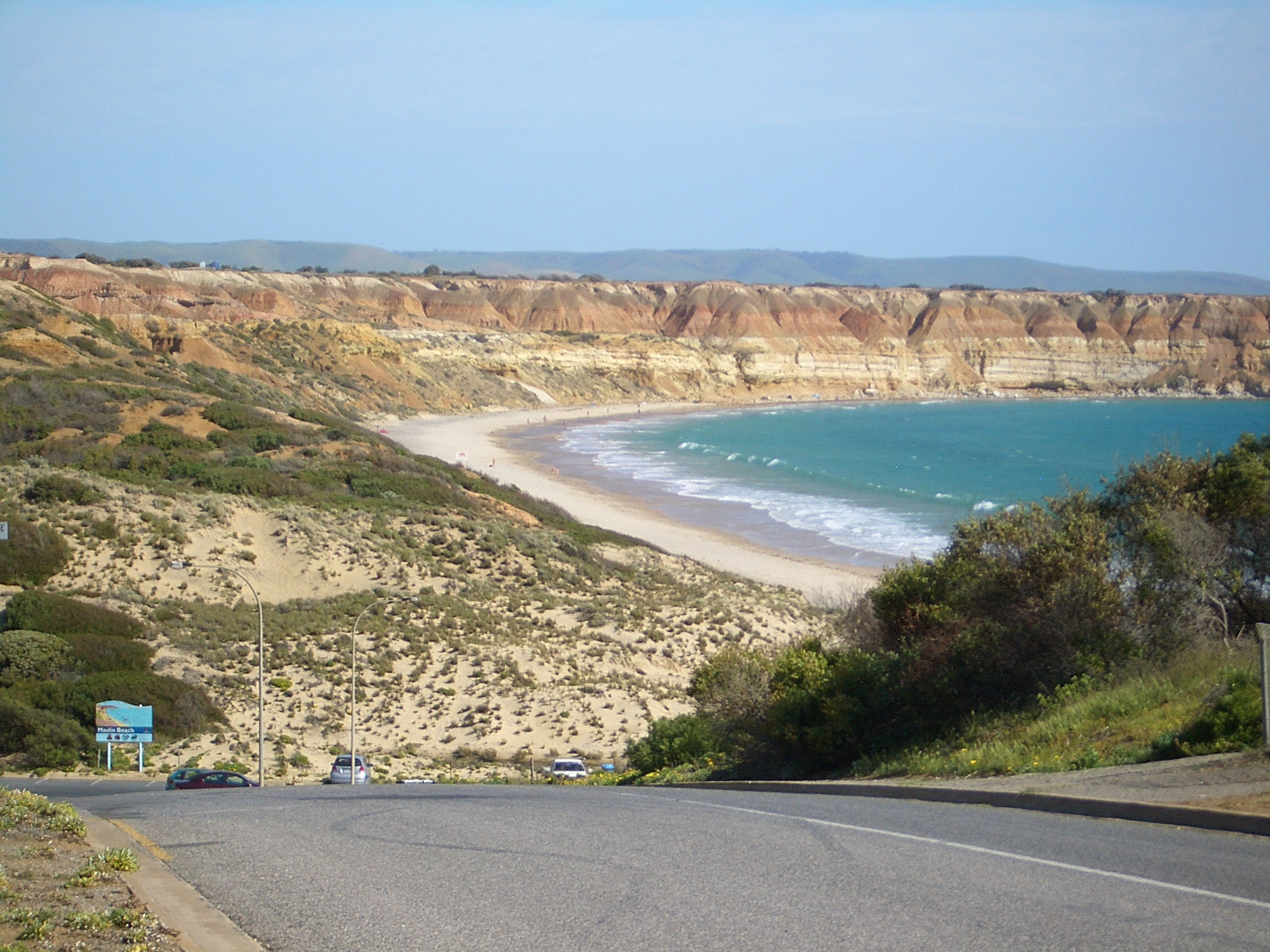
- Maslin Beach recreation reserve, viewed from the north, from the outskirts of the town of the same name

- Coordinates: 35.223°S 138.480°E
- Country: Australia
- State: South Australia
- Region: Southern Adelaide
- City: Adelaide
- LGA: City of Onkaparinga
- Location: 35 km (22 mi) SW of Adelaide city centre

Government
  - State electorate: Kaurna (2011)
  - Federal division: Kingston (2011)

Population
  - Total: 1,213 (SAL 2021)
- Postcode: 5170
- County: Adelaide
Suburbs around Maslin Beach
Gulf St Vincent	Moana; Seaford Rise	McLaren Vale
Gulf St Vincent	Maslin Beach	McLaren Vale; Tatachilla
Gulf St Vincent	Port Willunga; Aldinga	Tatachilla

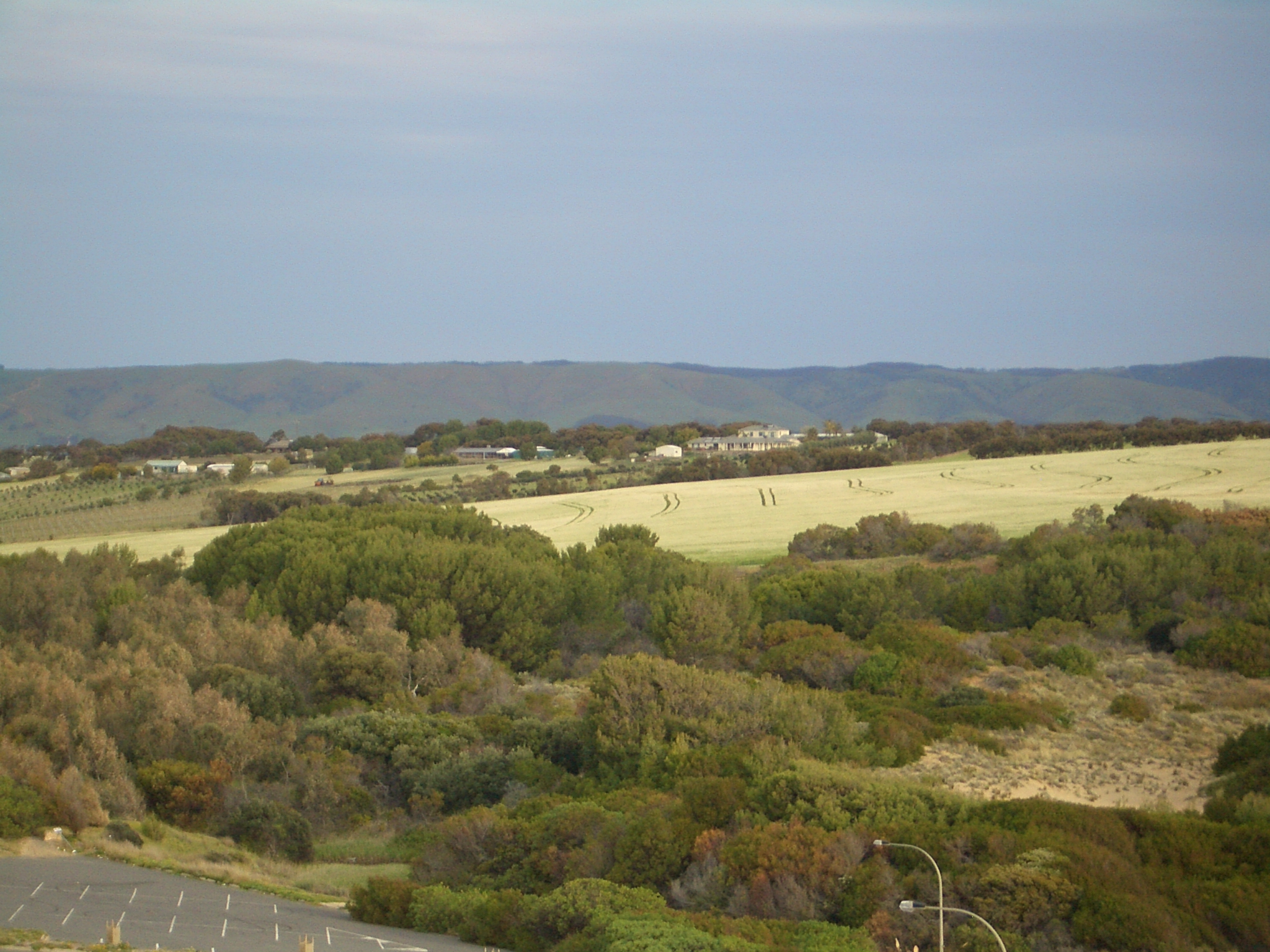
Agricultural area in Maslin Beach

Maslin Beach is a southern coastal suburb of Adelaide, South Australia. It is located in the City of Onkaparinga.

The name refers to the town of Maslin Beach, the beach after which it was named and the suburb which contains both. In this article, the name refers to the suburb, unless stated otherwise.

Red Ochre Cove lies south of Ochre Point, which separates Maslin Beach from Moana Beach to the north.

== Geography ==
Maslin Beach is located between South Road, which forms the suburbs eastern boundary, and Gulf St Vincent.

== Demographics ==
The 2021 Census by the Australian Bureau of Statistics counted 1,213 persons in Maslin Beach on census night. Of these, 49.5% were male and 50.5% were female.

The majority of residents (70.2%) are of Australian birth, with other common census responses being England (16.5%) and New Zealand (1.5%).

The age distribution of Maslin Beach residents in the 2021 census reported the median age was 46 years with 26.6% of the population being below the age of 25 and 73.6% being above the age of 25

== Community ==
Local newspapers include The Times and On The Coast.

On 18 April 2012, a 14-year-old boy from Aldinga died after falling 50 metres off a cliff at Maslin Beach

== Facilities and attractions ==
=== The beach ===
The most well-known attraction in the suburb is the beach at Maslin Beach. Also known as Maslin's Beach or, simply, Maslin's, the beach is the site of a cliff-lined recreation reserve stretching from Maslin Beach town in the north to Blanche Point in the south.

In 1975, the southern half of the beach was declared Australia's first official nude beach. The beach is almost 3 kilometres (1.9 miles) long, so the area reserved for nude bathing is away from other beach users.

The Maslin Beach Nude Olympics are held annually, consisting of informal competitions such as three-legged races and the judging of "best bum". This is now called the Pilwarren Maslin Beach Nude Games.

=== Parks ===
There are three parks in Maslin Beach. One is at the top of the stairs, one is on Beachway Avenue and one is on Parkway Avenue located next to the town hall.

== Development ==
The development of Maslins Beach and adjacent lands for prospective tourism and recreational facilities has been a subject of controversy. In 2014, the Onkaparinga Council rejected the prospect of rezoning lands for the potential development of a marina following objections from residents. The proponent lobbying for rezoning was Nobletech, represented by John Hunt. The Development Assessment Commission's agenda of 14 November 2013 noted that Nobletech wished to develop "a regional tourism hub to promote the natural environment and greater use of Maslin Beach."

== Transportation ==
=== Roads ===
Maslin Beach is serviced by Main South Road, connecting the suburb to both Adelaide city centre and the Fleurieu Peninsula.

=== Public transport ===
Maslin Beach is serviced by public transport run by the Adelaide Metro.

== Notable residents ==
- John F. Davis, artist

== See also ==
- List of Adelaide suburbs
- Maslin Beach (film)
