= Lonsdale, South Australia =

Lonsdale
- Suburb
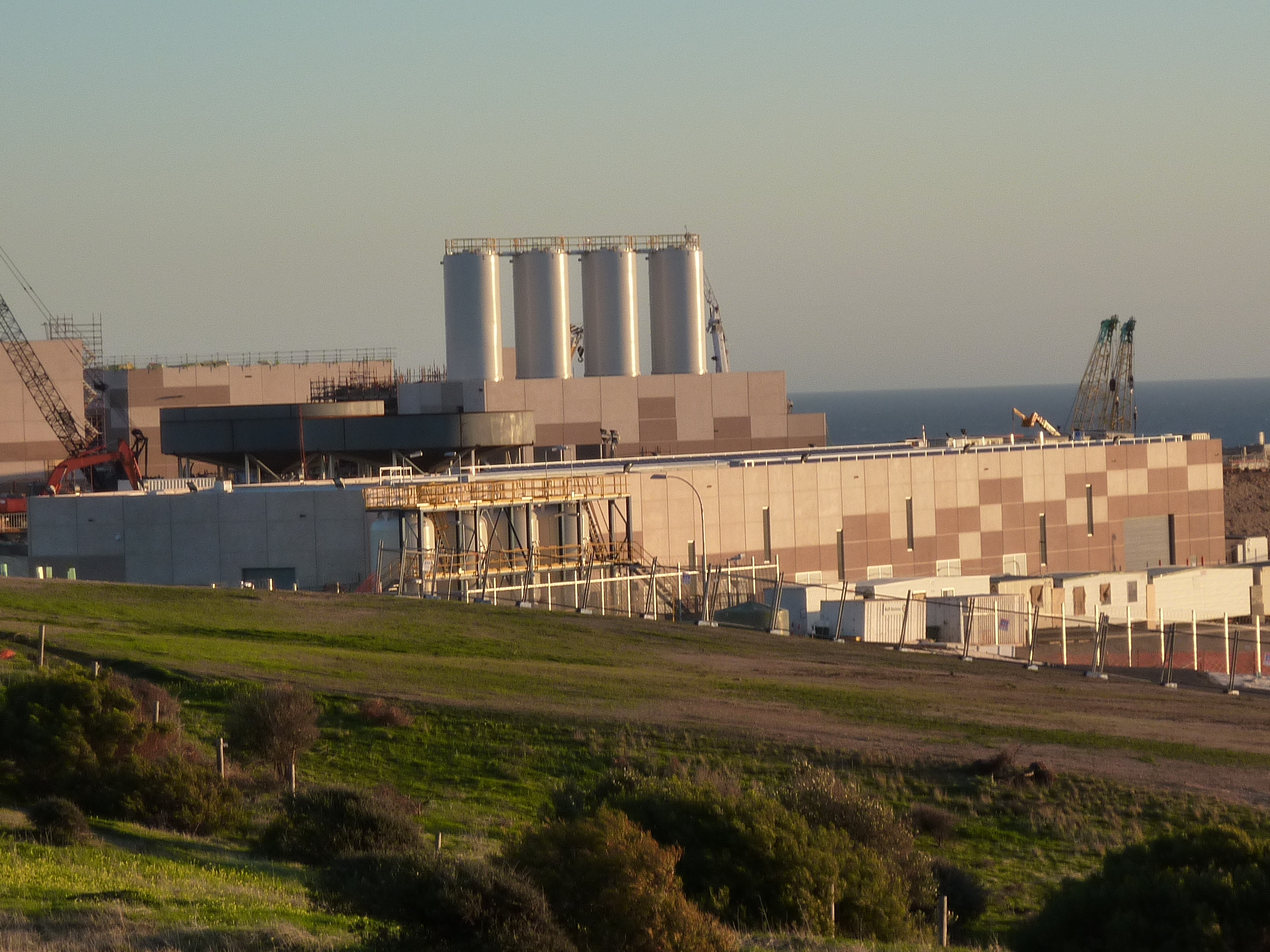
- Port Stanvac Desalination Plant, Lonsdale

- Coordinates: 35°06′54″S 138°30′04″E
- Country: Australia
- State: South Australia
- Region: Southern Adelaide
- City: Adelaide
- LGA: City of Onkaparinga

Government
  - State electorate: Reynell
  - Federal division: Kingston

Population
  - Total: 23 (SAL 2021)
- Postcode: 5160
- County: Adelaide
- Mean max temp: 21.7 °C (71.1 °F)
- Mean min temp: 12.8 °C (55.0 °F)
- Annual rainfall: 448.7 mm (17.67 in)
Suburbs around Lonsdale
Gulf St Vincent	Hallett Cove	Reynella
Gulf St Vincent	Lonsdale	Morphett Vale
O'Sullivan Beach; Christies Beach	Christie Downs	Morphett Vale
- Climate; Adjoining suburbs

Lonsdale is an industrial suburb south of Adelaide, South Australia, within the City of Onkaparinga.

Lonsdale was farmed from shortly after European settlement until the 1950s, when the South Australian Housing Trust acquired much of the land for industrial use. Mobil's Port Stanvac Refinery and Chrysler's engine foundry were followed by many other manufacturing and service industries. Subsequent suburban development of surrounding areas has driven demand for a wide range of service-oriented businesses in the area.

Port Stanvac Refinery and the Mitsubishi (formerly Chrysler) engine plant closed in 2004, with both sites remaining unused as of 2007. The South Australian Government announced plans to build a seawater desalination plant at the site in 2007, to provide fresh water for Adelaide. The Adelaide Desalination Plant opened in 2013.

Lonsdale is served by Lonsdale railway station. Lonsdale has SouthLink's largest southern bus depot.

== History ==
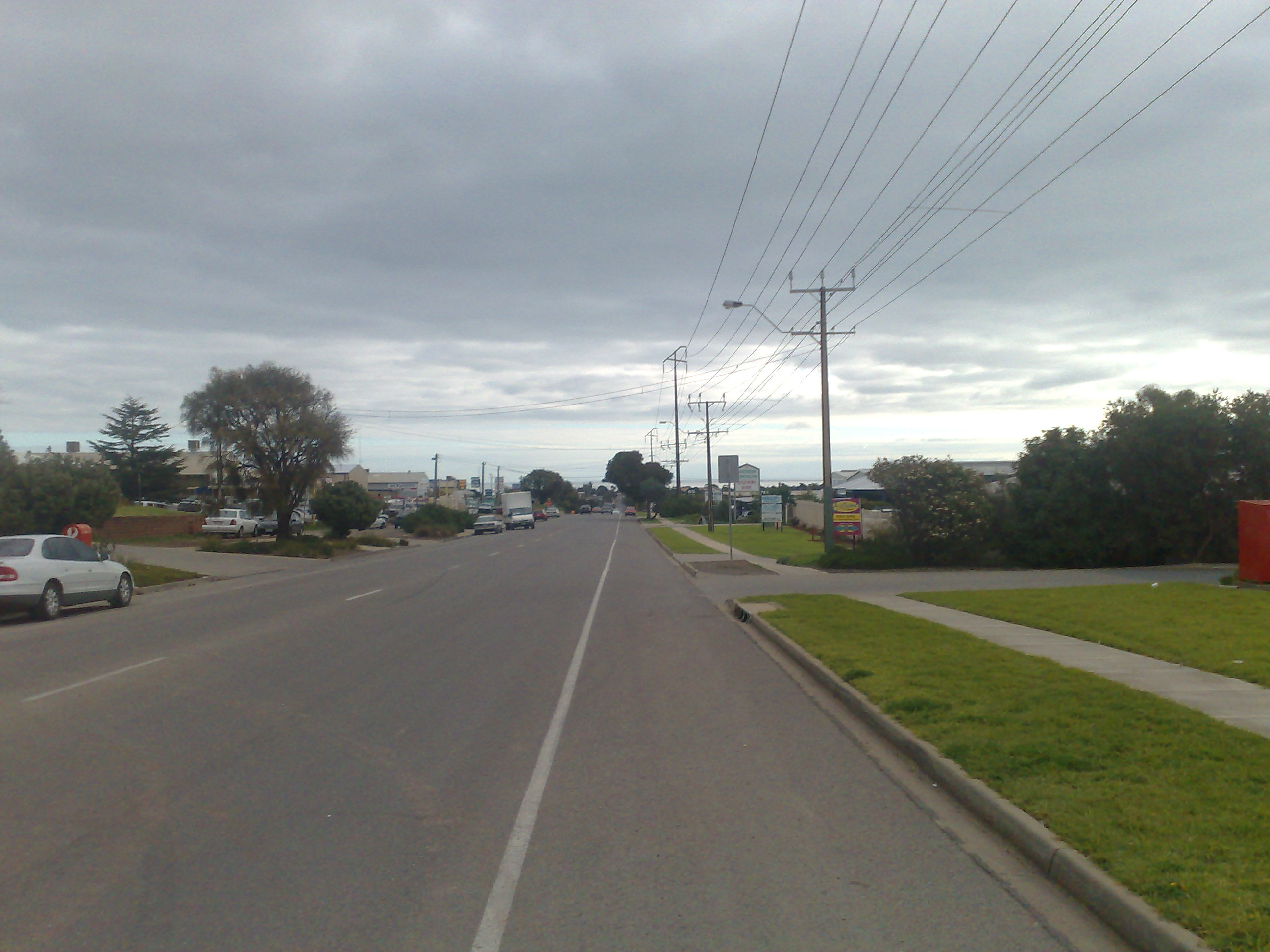
O'Sullivan Beach Road

Lonsdale was settled in the early 1840s in the movement of colonists into the Morphett Vale Region. One of its settlers had come from the English town of Kirkby Lonsdale. A local farmer gave the name Lonsdale to his property and in time this name was given to a local rail siding and eventually the suburb.

Farming continued in the area until the 1970s. The housing trust had purchased a large amount of land in the vicinity and portions of this were set aside for industrial use, with large firms like Chrysler and Sola Optical as well as the Port Stanvac Oil refinery moving in. Farming in the area had become unprofitable by the 1980s.

The suburb was also known for being the origin of the name of the Lonsdale automobile marque of the Colt Car Company in the United Kingdom, the marque sold a badge engineered version of the Adelaide-assembled Mitsubishi Sigma

== Industry ==
In October 1979 the State Transport Authority opened a bus depot on the corner of Sheriffs Road and Kaworri Street. Today it is operated by Busways.

== See also ==
- Rail Car Depot Relocation project - 30 railcars with scope for future expansion.
