= Onkaparinga Hills, South Australia =

Onkaparinga Hills
- Suburb
- Spriggs Road

- Country: Australia
- State: South Australia
- Region: Southern Adelaide
- LGA: City of Onkaparinga
- Location: 33.5 km (20.8 mi) from Adelaide
- Established: 1840s

Government
  - State electorates: Heysen; Kaurna
  - Federal division: Kingston

Population
  - Total: 2,610 (SAL 2021)
- Postcode: 5163
- County: Adelaide
Suburbs around Onkaparinga Hills
Morphett Vale	Woodcroft	Happy Valley
Hackham	Onkaparinga Hills	Clarendon
McLaren Vale	McLaren Vale	Blewitt Springs

Onkaparinga Hills is a southern suburb of Adelaide, in the City of Onkaparinga, South Australia. It covers an area of approximately 22 square kilometres (8.5 square miles). It has a population of 2534 people (2011 Census). It is a leafy suburb that includes parts of the Onkaparinga River National Park.

Nearly 60% of families in the area are couples with children, compared to an Australian average of 45.3%. The median rent in 2006 was $230. The current median cost of a home in the area is $390 000. 93.5% of people speak English only at home (Australian average 78.5%) and 91% are Australian citizens compared to the Australian average of 86.1%. The Onkaparinga Hills are examples of folding.

== History ==
Prior to European colonisation, the area was inhabited by the Kaurna people. The name Onkaparinga is derived from the Kaurna word ngankiparrinnga, meaning 'The Women's River'.

European settlement dates from the 1840s. Most of the settlers were initially farmers, with vineyards later being established. After the war there was significant development and again in the early 1990s. The population is now relatively stable. There are still sections of the area used for vineyards, farming and grazing.
