= Hackham, South Australia =

Hackham
- Suburb
- Country: Australia
- State: South Australia
- Region: Southern Adelaide
- City: Adelaide
- LGA: City of Onkaparinga
- Location: 25 km (16 mi) from Adelaide

Government
  - State electorate: Kaurna
  - Federal division: Kingston

Population
  - Total: 4,491 (SAL 2021)
- Postcode: 5163
- County: Adelaide
Suburbs around Hackham
Hackham West	Morphett Vale	Onkaparinga Hills
Huntfield Heights Hackham West	Hackham	Onkaparinga Hills
Huntfield Heights	Onkaparinga Heights Onkaparinga Views	Onkaparinga Hills

Hackham is an outer metropolitan suburb of Adelaide, South Australia. It lies within the City of Onkaparinga.

The Coast to Vines rail trail passes through the suburb. The post code within the Hackham suburb is "5163".

== History ==
The township of Hackham was surveyed for Edward Castle on Section 25 Hundred of Noarlunga in 1856. Castle had arrived in South Australia in 1839 and it is thought named the new settlement after his former home in Gloucestershire. Another version of the naming of the place states that J.B. Hack, an early colonist, lent his name to it and yet another has it that James Kingdon, the first owner of the section prior to Castle, named it.

One contemporary account stated that town of Hackham was 'peculiarly adapted for its purpose, being in the centre of a large agricultural district. The land is sloping and dry in winter'.

By 1866, Hackham was linked by a daily coach to Adelaide and it contained a post office, licensed school, and a hotel, the Golden Pheasant. The town did not flourish however and during the 1880s dwindled to virtually nothing more than gardens, farms and wattle plantations. One of those gardens, a plant nursery maintained by F.W. Hutchinson, became well known for its seed production.

The Craig, Collins, Hutchinson, Holly, Humphris, Forsyth and Sparrow families were just some of those that pioneered the place. It was predominantly a farming region, specialising in cereal production until the 1960s and 1970s when the encroachment of suburban subdivisions changed land use.

== Walking and cycling trails ==
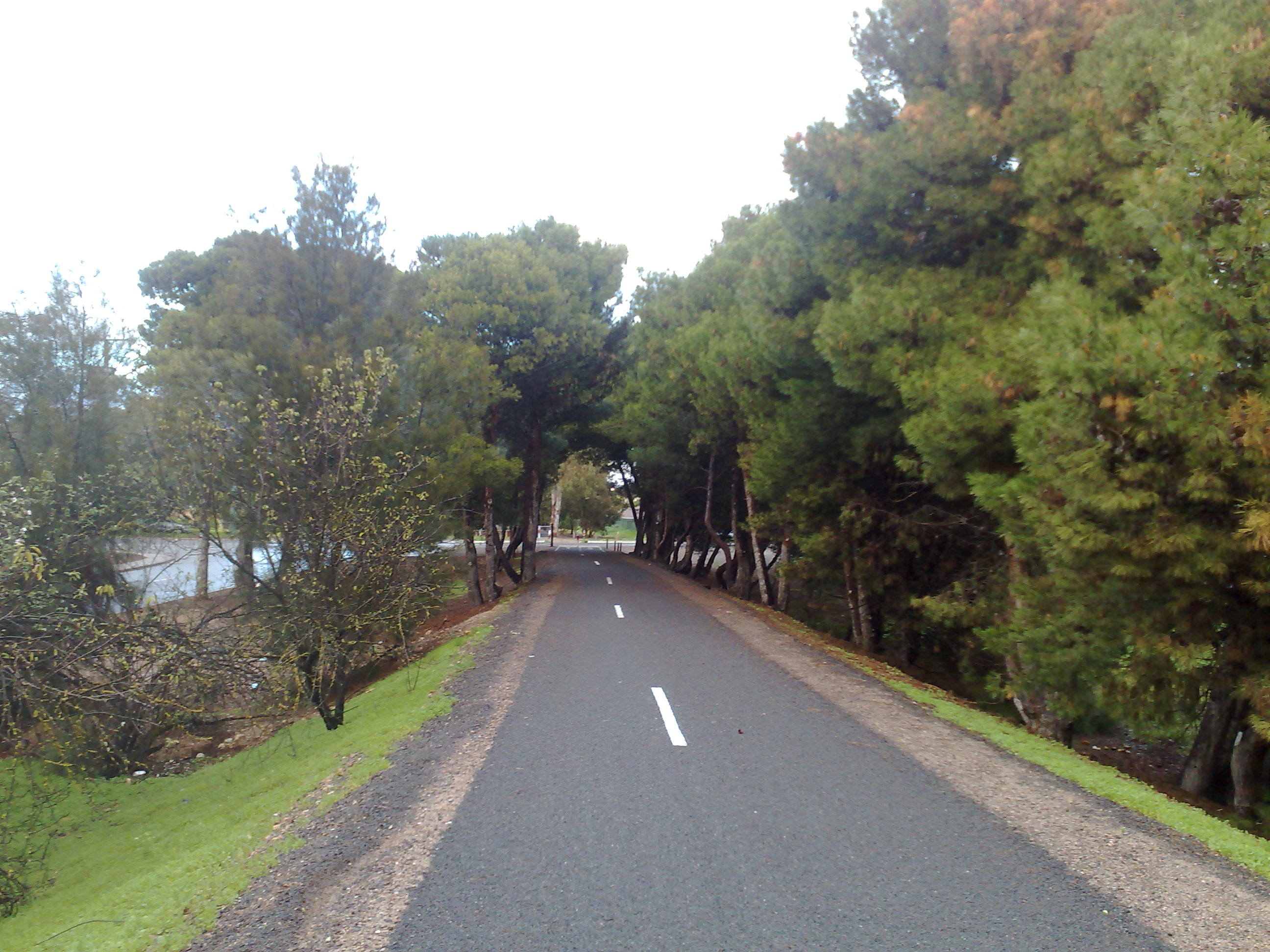
The Coast to Vines rail trail

The Coast to Vines rail trail passes through the suburb. Heading north the trail finishes at Marino and heading south the trail finishes at Willunga.

== Amenities ==
- Huntfield Heights Primary School C.P.C - 7 Primary School
- Hackham West R-7 School
- Hackham East Junior & Primary School
- Holly reserve
- Forsyth reserve

== Notes ==
1. Hackham - European History and Heritage
