= Division of Kingston =

Australian federal electoral division

Coordinates: 35.201°S 138.535°E

Kingston Australian House of Representatives Division
- Interactive map of boundaries since the 2019 federal election
- Created: 1949
- MP: Amanda Rishworth
- Party: Labor
- Namesake: Charles Kingston
- Electors: 127,943 (2025)
- Area: 165 km^{2} (63.7 sq mi)
- Demographic: Outer metropolitan

The Division of Kingston is an Australian Electoral Division in South Australia covering the outer southern suburbs of Adelaide. The 165 km^{2} (64 sq mi) seat stretches from Hallett Cove and O'Halloran Hill in the north to Maslin Beach in the south, including the suburbs of Aberfoyle Park, Christie Downs, Christies Beach, Flagstaff Hill, Hackham, Hallett Cove, Huntfield Heights, Lonsdale, Maslin Beach, Moana, Morphett Vale, Old Noarlunga, Onkaparinga Hills, Port Noarlunga, Reynella, Seaford, Sheidow Park, Port Willunga, Trott Park, Woodcroft, and parts of Happy Valley and McLaren Flat.

== History ==
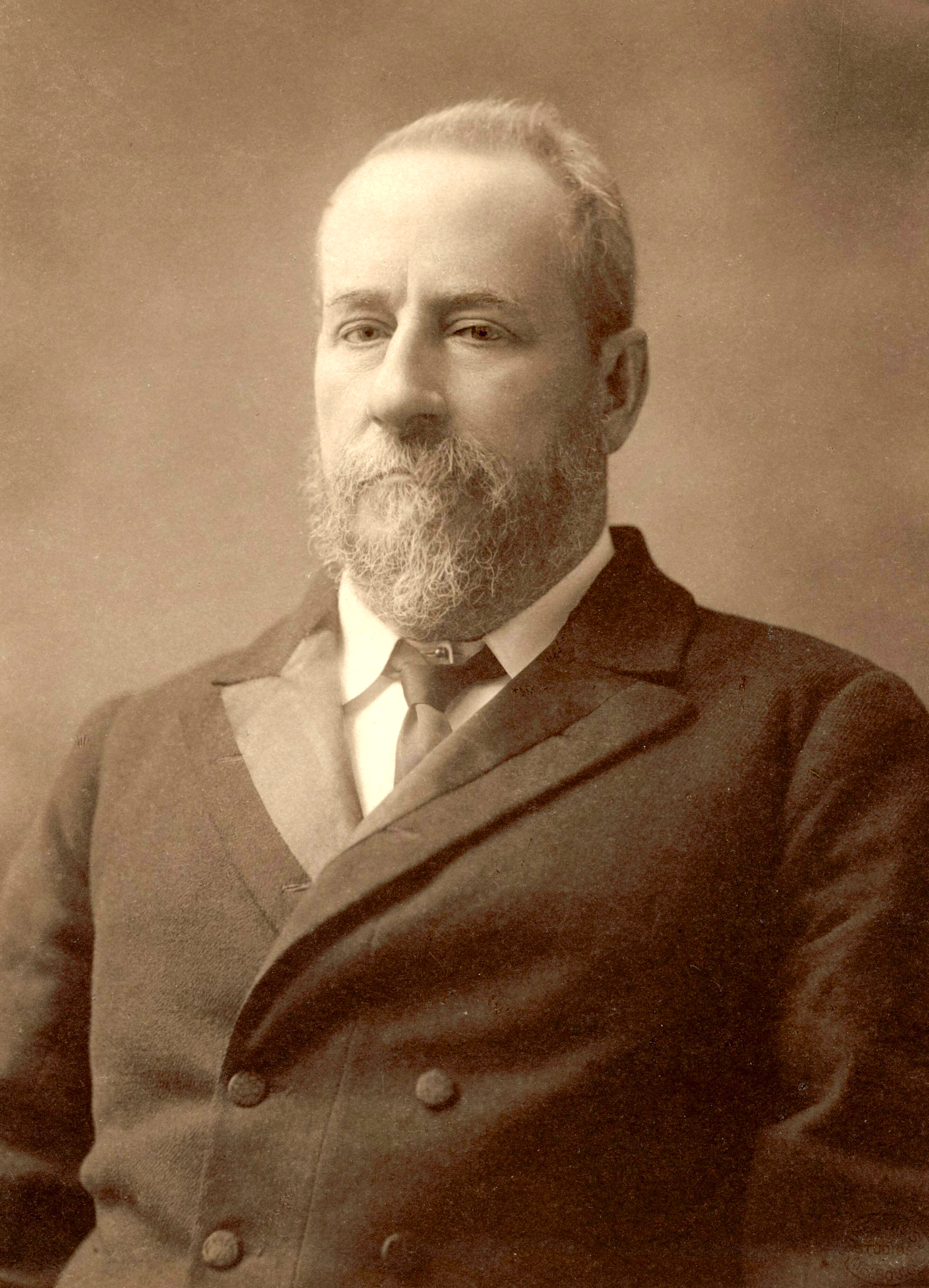
Charles Kingston, the division's namesake

The division was named after Charles Kingston, Premier of South Australia (1893–1899), elected to the first House of Representatives in 1901 and the first Federal member of the Division of Adelaide in 1903. Kingston was first based on the Holdfast Bay area to the north of the current boundaries from the 1949 election as a notionally marginal to fairly safe Labor seat. However, it fell to the Liberals in that election, only to have Labor win it at the 1951 election. This started a tradition of Labor and the Liberals alternating for long spells in a seat that has slowly moved south over the decades. It has now moved almost clear of its original boundaries; Hallett Cove is the only suburb within the seat's current borders that was part of the seat in 1949.

It has tended to elect an MP from the governing party of the day, having elected only four opposition MPs. Notably, every sitting member in the electorate's history has been defeated at the polls—none have retired or resigned.

Kingston has been represented by Labor MP Amanda Rishworth since the 2007 election where she won with a 54.4 percent two-party vote from a 4.5 percent swing. Going into the 2010 election, it was the most marginal Labor seat in South Australia. However, Rishworth consolidated her hold on the seat in 2010 by winning a 64 percent two-party vote from a 9.5 percent swing. At the 2013 election, Rishworth suffered a 4.9 percent swing to finish on a 59.7 percent two-party vote, but was still the second largest vote of any party in Kingston's history. In 2016, Rishworth further strengthened her hold on Kingston by boosting her majority to 67.1 percent on a swing of 7.7 percent, the strongest result in the seat's history. It is now Labor's second-safest seat in South Australia, behind only Port Adelaide, on two-party terms, however on the primary vote Kingston polled one percent higher at over 49 percent, the highest primary vote of South Australia's 11 seats. Though Labor picked up a two-party swing in all eleven seats, the presence of Nick Xenophon Team candidates in all eleven seats produced, apart from a suppressed major party primary vote, a result where Rishworth was the only major party candidate in the state to pick up a primary vote swing.

== Redistributions ==
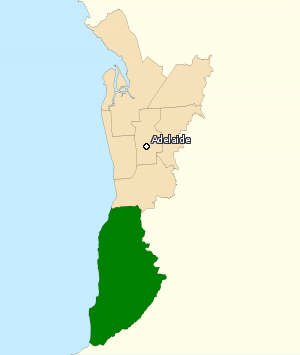
The larger 2004–13 incarnation

Kingston began to move south from 1969 when the Holdfast Bay area was transferred to the newly created seat of Hawker. Successive redistributions saw Hawker continue to push Kingston south over time, and by 1984 the seat had moved to roughly its current position, though without the current southern coastal strip.

Since 1984, federal electoral division boundaries in Australia have been determined at redistributions by a redistribution committee appointed by the Australian Electoral Commission. Redistributions occur for the boundaries of divisions in a particular state, and they occur every seven years, or sooner if a state's representation entitlement changes or when divisions of a state are malapportioned.

The redistribution before the 2013 election removed Kingston's rural areas with the transfer of around 6,500 voters in McLaren Vale and Willunga to Mayo, increasing Labor's Kingston margin by half a percent. This substantially reduced the area covered by the electorate, down from 377 to 171 square kilometres (146 to 66 sq mi), almost the same as the 2001 to 2004 boundaries. The previous larger boundaries were used from 2004 to 2013 and loosely from 1993 to 1998.

== Members ==
Image	Member	Party	Term	Notes
	Jim Handby (1903–1991)	Liberal	10 December 1949 – 28 April 1951	Lost seat
	Pat Galvin (1911–1980)	Labor	28 April 1951 – 26 November 1966	Lost seat
	Kay Brownbill (1914–2002)	Liberal	26 November 1966 – 25 October 1969	Lost seat
	Richard Gun (1936–)	Labor	25 October 1969 – 13 December 1975	Lost seat
	Grant Chapman (1949–)	Liberal	13 December 1975 – 5 March 1983	Lost seat. Later elected to the Senate in 1987
	Gordon Bilney (1939–2012)	Labor	5 March 1983 – 2 March 1996	Served as minister under Hawke and Keating. Lost seat
	Susan Jeanes (1958–)	Liberal	2 March 1996 – 3 October 1998	Lost seat
	David Cox (1954–)	Labor	3 October 1998 – 9 October 2004	Lost seat
	Kym Richardson (1958–)	Liberal	9 October 2004 – 24 November 2007	Lost seat
	Amanda Rishworth (1978–)	Labor	24 November 2007 – present	Incumbent. Currently a minister under Albanese

== Election results ==
2025 Australian federal election: Kingston
Party	Candidate	Votes	%	±%
Labor	Amanda Rishworth	59,758	53.03	+3.83
Liberal	Jim Rishworth	20,994	18.63	−7.22
Greens	John Photakis	15,149	13.44	+1.00
One Nation	Nathan Skrlj	7,018	6.23	+1.37
Trumpet of Patriots	Russell Jackson	4,165	3.70	+2.71
Family First	Steven Price	3,560	3.16	+3.16
Animal Justice	Bin Liu	2,051	1.82	+1.82
Total formal votes		112,695	95.79	−0.40
Informal votes		4,959	4.21	+0.40
Turnout		117,654	91.98	+0.61
Two-party-preferred result
Labor	Amanda Rishworth	79,721	70.74	+4.39
Liberal	Jim Rishworth	32,974	29.26	−4.39
Labor hold		Swing	+4.39	

== See also ==
- 2016 Australian federal election
- Results of the Australian federal election, 2016 (South Australia)
