= Tatachilla, South Australia =

Tatachilla
- Suburb
- Country: Australia
- State: South Australia
- Region: Southern Adelaide
- City: Adelaide

Government
  - State electorate: Mawson

Population
  - Total: 231 (SAL 2021)
- Postcode: 5171
- County: Adelaide

Tatachilla is a semi-rural suburb of Adelaide, South Australia. It lies within the City of Onkaparinga. It is the location of the Tatachilla Lutheran College.
