= Moana, South Australia =

Moana
- Suburb
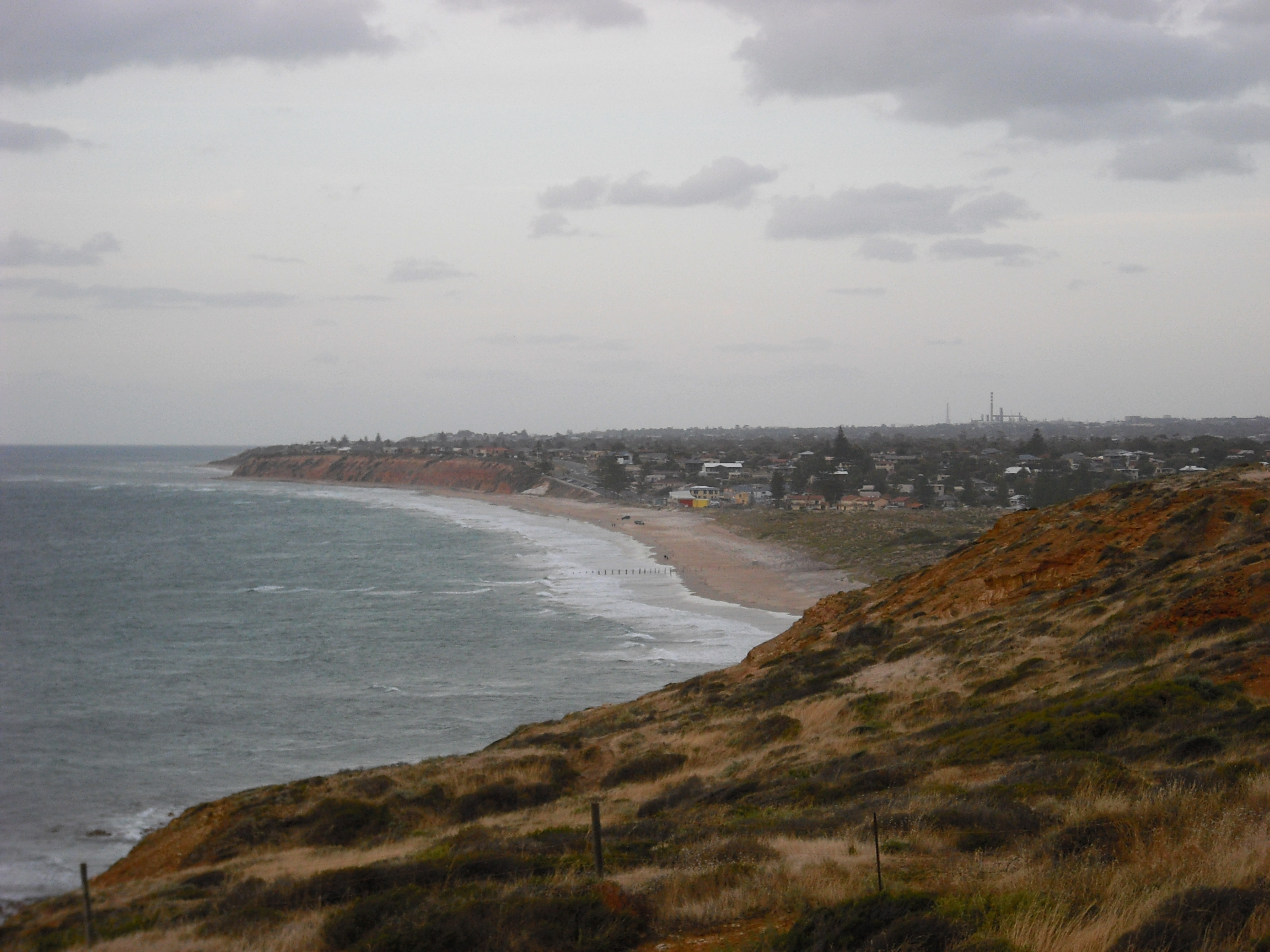
- A view of Moana from the south

- Coordinates: 35.198°S 138.473°E
- Country: Australia
- State: South Australia
- Region: Southern Adelaide
- City: Adelaide
- LGA: City of Onkaparinga

Population
  - Total: 3,316 (SAL 2021)
- Postcode: 5169
- County: Adelaide
Suburbs around Moana
Gulf St Vincent	Seaford	Seaford
Gulf St Vincent	Moana	Seaford Rise
Gulf St Vincent	Maslin Beach	Maslin Beach

Moana is an outer coastal suburb in the south of Adelaide, South Australia. The suburb is approximately 36.4 km from the Adelaide city centre. It lies within the City of Onkaparinga local government area, and neighbours the suburbs Seaford, Maslin Beach, Seaford Rise and Port Noarlunga It is divided into two by Pedler Creek and the associated sand dune reserve. The beach is often referred to as Moana Beach.

Ochre Point lies between Moana and Maslin Beach. Ochre Cove, or Red Ochre Cove, lies just south of the point. There is a large deposit of red ochre near the cove, which was used as a source by the traditional owners, the Kaurna people. The cove was known as Potartang, also spelt Putatang, or Mulgali (the latter the Ngarrindjeri word for ochre), is a site of significance and part of the Tjilbruke Dreaming Trail.

== History ==
Moana is located on the traditional lands of the Kaurna people. Red Ochre Cove (Tindale's Ochre Cove) was a source of ochre for use in ceremonies and as body paint. There is a commemorative plaque marking the site of the third freshwater spring said to be created by the Kaurna ancestor creator Tjilbruke, as part of the Tjilbruke Dreaming Track created in 1986.

After British colonisation of South Australia, settlers started farming the area, from about 1841. In the 1850s a local landowner lent his name to the beach and it became known as Dodd's Beach. In 1855, when shipping was the primary means of cargo transport in the area, Nashwauk was wrecked on the beach near the Pedler Creek outlet.

Due to an increased interest in tourism in the area, in 1927 the land was subdivided by Lake Beach Estate Ltd who held a competition to name the new town. Mr C.H. Cave won the competition with "Moana", which is a Polynesian languages term meaning "ocean". The land was divided into blocks of land suitable for holiday homes and wide streets were planned and laid out, but due to the Great Depression in 1929 development of the area was slow.

In the 1950s Moana experienced renewed interest from tourism as the residents of Adelaide enjoyed the freedom and mobility of car ownership – Moana was a pleasant 40-minute drive from Adelaide.

One of the landmarks of the area was the Moana Roundhouse, which was demolished in 2006.

== Beach front ==
The Gulf St Vincent beach front at Moana is a combination of low cliffs, sand dunes, and hard compacted sand. The beach at Moana is accessible by normal passenger vehicles and is one of the few beaches where cars are allowed to drive onto the beach.

== Geography ==
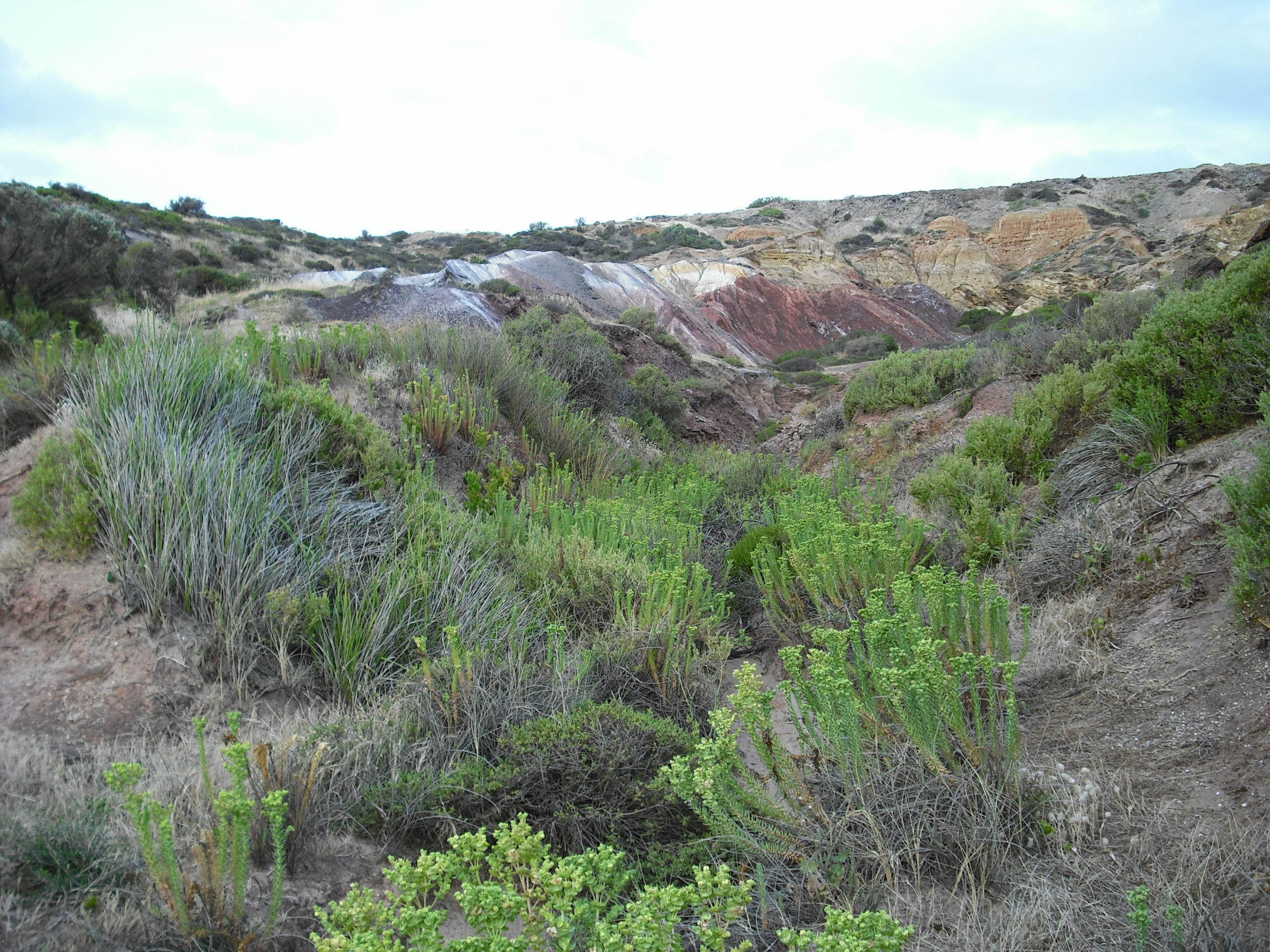
In the Ochre Point reserve area south of town

Moana is a seaside suburb. It is divided into two by Pedler Creek and the associated sand dune reserve. The northern part of the Moana is referred to as the "old survey Moana" and the southern housing development as the "new survey".

There is a large deposit of red ochre near Red Ochre Cove, sometimes referred to as Serpent's Tongue.

The Coast to Vines rail trail passes through Moana. There was a station at Moana on the former Marino-Willunga rail line that it follows.

== Transport ==
Moana is serviced by the 741, 745, 747, 749 and 750 bus routes which terminate at the Colonnades Shopping Centre and Noarlunga Centre railway station.

== Attractions ==
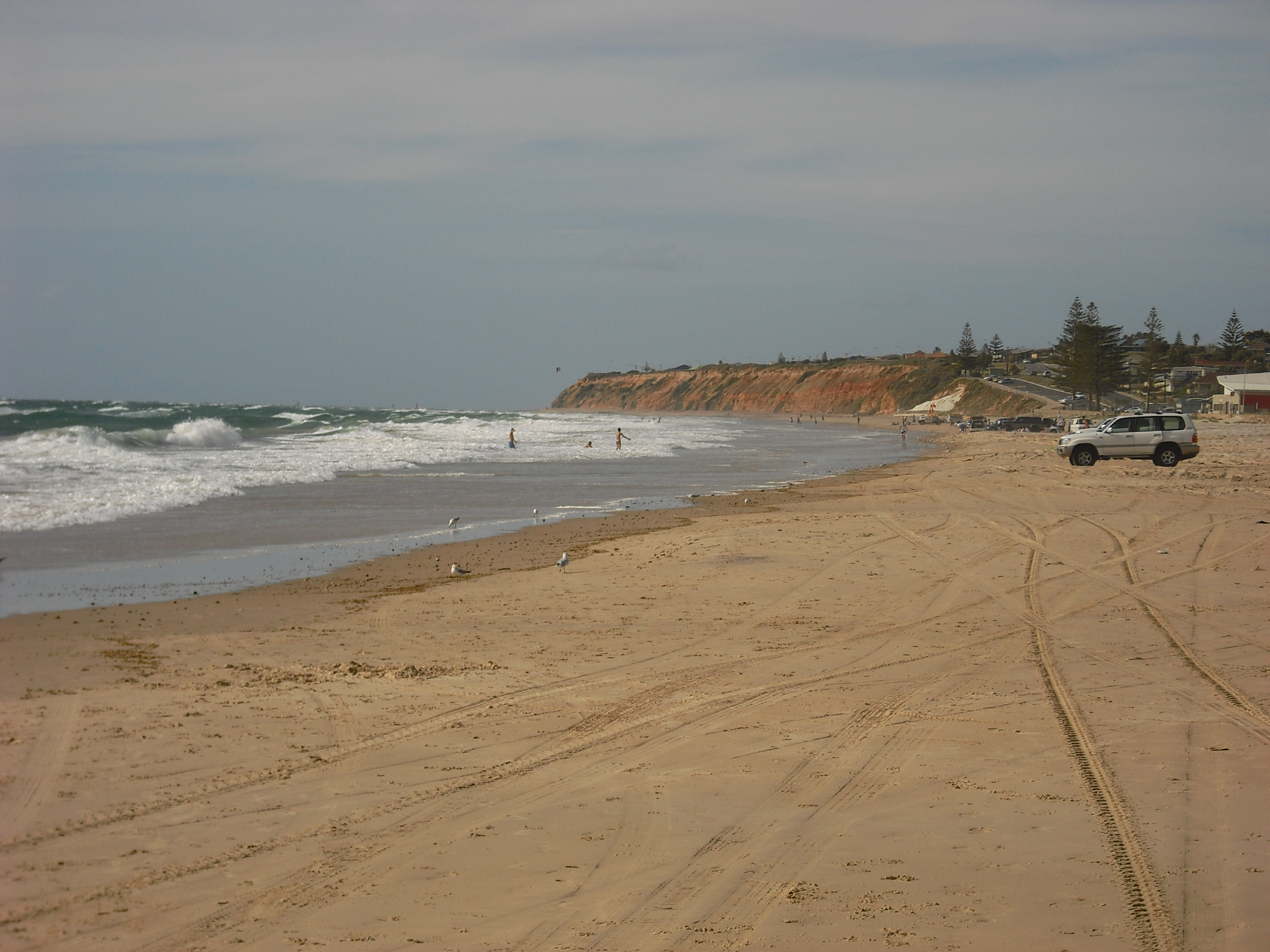
Moana beach

Moana has a sandy beach with beginner surfing waves, so is popular with families. Moana Surf Life Saving Club patrols the beach in summer and has a beachfront cafe called Duke's, named after the Hawaiian surfer who visited Australia and helped popularize the sport.

Moana is one of the last beaches in Adelaide where a vehicle can be driven onto the beach and parked legally, so becomes a popular tourist destination in good weather. Takeaway food options make it a destination on summer nights. A monthly market is held at the Pioneer's Memorial Hall, which has an anchor from the Nashwauk shipwreck in front.

In 2008 the foreshore area of "old survey" Moana has undergone redevelopment by the local council, with improvements to the road, walkway, and sea wall. A new toilet block and shaded "gazebo", the latter shaped in the form of a seagull, have been added to the foreshore area. On warm nights this foreshore area can become a site where buskers perform for passers by, or people draw chalk mandalas.

A sloping ramp at the north end of the foreshore that originally provided access to the beach was damaged by erosion of the cliffs during storm activity in 2007. Several ramps and a staircase provided beach access along the cliff and esplanade. Access infrastructure to the beach continues to be impacted by storm surges increasing in frequency due to climate change, requiring council maintenance and repair.

The Willunga Basin Trail now extends to Moana Beach along Pedler Creek, catering to walkers and hikers. Threatened species such as the hooded plover nest in the dunes, attracting bird watchers, though chicks' survival is threatened by dog walking and vehicles driving near the dunes.

== See also ==
- List of Adelaide suburbs
- Moana Sands Conservation Park
