= Christie Downs, South Australia =

Christie Downs
- Suburb
- Country: Australia
- State: South Australia
- Region: Southern Adelaide
- City: Adelaide
- LGA: City of Onkaparinga

Government
  - State electorate: Reynell

Population
  - Total: 5,239 (SAL 2021)
- Postcode: 5164
- County: Adelaide
Suburbs around Christie Downs
Lonsdale	Lonsdale	Morphett Vale
Christies Beach	Christie Downs	Morphett Vale
Christies Beach	Noarlunga Centre	Hackham West

Christie Downs is a suburb in southern Metropolitan Adelaide within the city of Onkaparinga, South Australia. It has a unique postcode of 5164, and is adjacent to the suburbs of Christies Beach to the west, Noarlunga Centre to the south, Morphett Vale to the east and Lonsdale to the north.

The area was named after Lambert Christie, who was one of the original European settlers in the area. The area continued to be mainly farming land until the late 1950s when large portions were purchased by the South Australian Housing Trust. Since then the suburb has steadily grown to have almost 2500 households.

The suburb is served by Christie Downs railway station on the Seaford railway line.
