= Noarlunga Centre railway station =

Railway station and bus interchange in Adelaide, South Australia

Noarlunga Centre
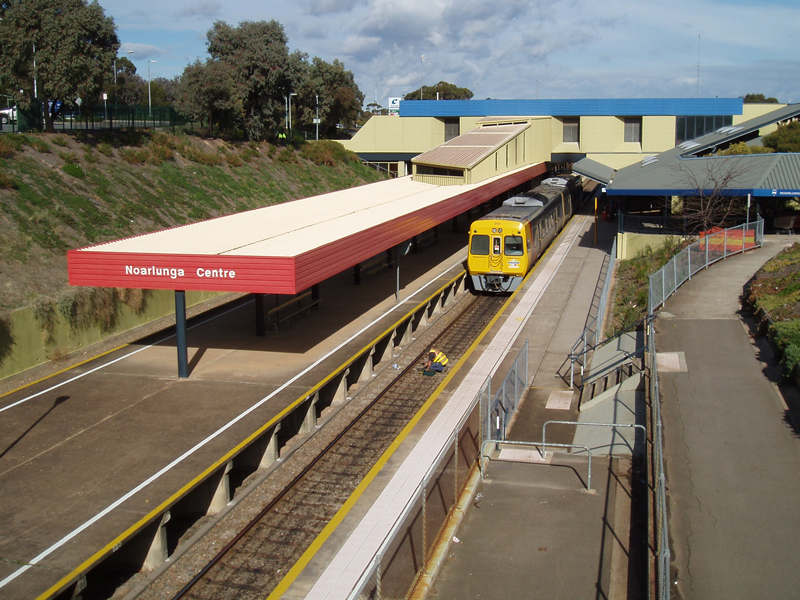
- Southbound view of Platform 1, with a 3000 class railcar at the station, June 2006

General information
- Location: Burgess Drive, Noarlunga Centre
- Coordinates: 35°08′24″S 138°29′33″E
- System: Railway station and bus interchange
- Owner: Department for Infrastructure & Transport
- Operator: Adelaide Metro
- Line: Seaford
- Distance: 30.2 km from Adelaide
- Platforms: 3
- Tracks: 2
- Bus routes: 721, T721, 721X, 722, T722, 722X, 723X, 733, 733G, 734, 741, 741A, 743, 744, 745, 745A, 745C, 747, 747A, 747B, 750A, 750B, 750C, 751, 751A, 751H, 751R, 751W, 756, 770, 774, 777, 778, 782

Construction
- Structure type: At grade, below ground level; island platform
- Parking: Yes
- Cycle facilities: Yes

History
- Opened: 2 April 1978
- Rebuilt: 2004

Services
Preceding station	Adelaide Metro	Following station
Christie Downs towards Adelaide	Seaford line	Seaford Meadows towards Seaford
Location

Noarlunga Centre railway station is a railway station on the Seaford line, and for almost 36 years (April 2, 1978 - February 23, 2014) it was the terminus of the line. Situated in the southern Adelaide suburb of Noarlunga Centre, it is 30.2 kilometres from Adelaide station. The station has a bus interchange directly alongside and is adjacent to a large commuter park & ride facility.

== History ==
Prior to the railway line being extended in the mid-1970s, most local trains from Adelaide terminated at either Marino or Hallett Cove, a station on the closed line to Willunga. Noarlunga Centre opened on 2 April 1978 as the terminus of the line when it was extended from Christie Downs. It was built as an island platform between the two rail tracks and the ticket office on the bridge above. Passengers accessed the platforms via escalators or a ramp and typically had a long walk between trains and buses.

In 1996, a third platform face was added alongside the western track, and the ticket office relocated onto the platform level. The project was completed in March 2004 and until the Seaford rail extension most trains used this western track, giving passengers safer and more direct access to connecting buses. Prior to the Seaford rail extension, Platform 1 had been mostly disused. There are no storage facilities for trains at Noarlunga Centre. However a number of the extra railcars needed for peak-hour services on the line are stabled overnight in secure sidings at Port Stanvac, around four kilometres north, just beyond Lonsdale station.

Since the 1990s, there has been significant residential development at Seaford and Aldinga, south of Noarlunga Centre with several proposals to extend the rail line southwards from Noarlunga Interchange to serve the Seaford district. A corridor of land had been reserved. In 2009, construction of the extension to Seaford commenced, and was opened on 23 February 2014. Ticket gates have been installed for the station to combat against fare evasion, similar to those at Adelaide railway station and Salisbury.

== Services by platform ==
Platform	Destination/s
1	Seaford
2	Adelaide
3	Adelaide
