= South Brighton railway station, Adelaide =

Former railway station in South Australia, Australia

Coordinates: 35°01′30″S 138°31′15″E

South Brighton railway station is a former station on the Seaford line in Adelaide, South Australia. It was opened in 1934, and was located about 15.8 kilometres from Adelaide station. After the extension of the line to Christie Downs in 1976, the station was closed, and was demolished shortly after. The rebuilt Brighton railway station, 200 metres to the south, was opened in the same year.

A subway under the old station remained in use until the early 1990s, but was then filled in and replaced with a ground-level passenger walkway. Adjacent to the old station is a disused delicatessen, now a residential building, that served the station's passengers, and then the local population until the early 1990s.
