= Marino Rocks Greenway =

Cycle route in Adelaide, Australia

The Marino Rocks Greenway is a 15 kilometres (9.3 mi) cycling route in Adelaide, South Australia. It follows the Seaford railway line from the southwestern corner of the Adelaide city centre to Marino Rocks railway station. The route leads into the Coast to Vines Rail Trail which continues along the alignment of the former Willunga railway line.

The Greenway uses a combination of Shared use paths and low-traffic local streets. The northern end connects to the shared paths in the West Parklands by providing an underpass beneath Anzac Highway and Greenhill Road adjacent to Adelaide Showground railway station.
