= Stanvac =

Stanvac may refer to:

- Port Stanvac, South Australia
- Standard Vacuum Oil Company
