= Marino Rocks railway station =

Railway station in Adelaide, South Australia

Marino Rocks
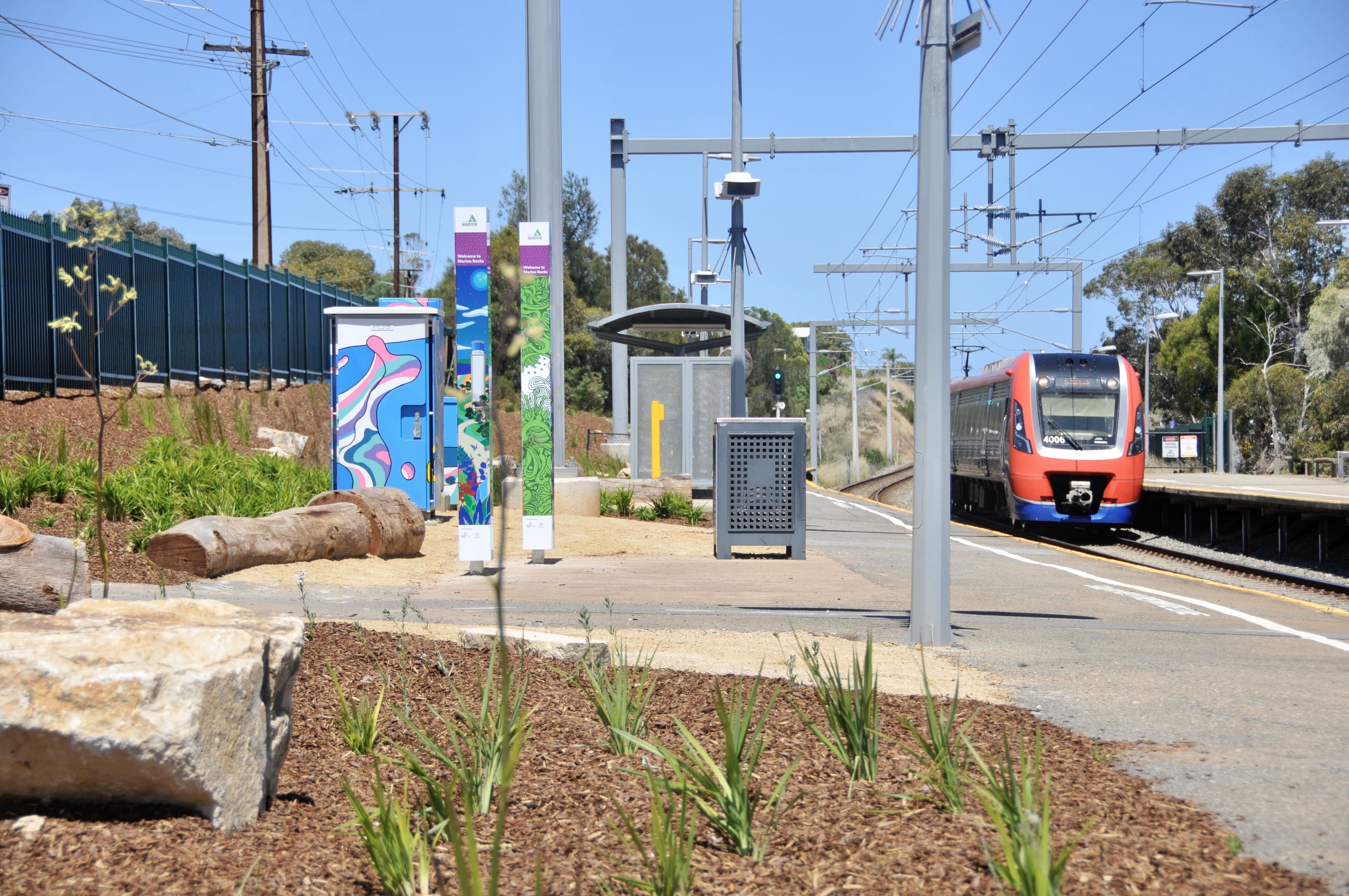
- South-west bound view from Platform 2, showing the platforms landscaping and a Adelaide Metro 4000 class, November 2019

General information
- Location: The Cove Road, Marino
- Coordinates: 35°02′46″S 138°30′46″E
- Owner: Department for Infrastructure & Transport
- Operator: Adelaide Metro
- Line: Seaford
- Distance: 10.2 km from Adelaide
- Platforms: 2
- Tracks: 2

Construction
- Structure type: Ground
- Parking: Yes

History
- Opened: 6 April 1914
- Rebuilt: March 1974

Services
Preceding station	Adelaide Metro	Following station
Marino towards Adelaide	Seaford line	Hallett Cove towards Seaford
Location

Marino Rocks railway station is located on the Seaford line. Situated in the southern Adelaide suburb of Marino, it is 18.9 kilometres from Adelaide station and leads directly into Nimboya Road Reserve and park.

== History ==
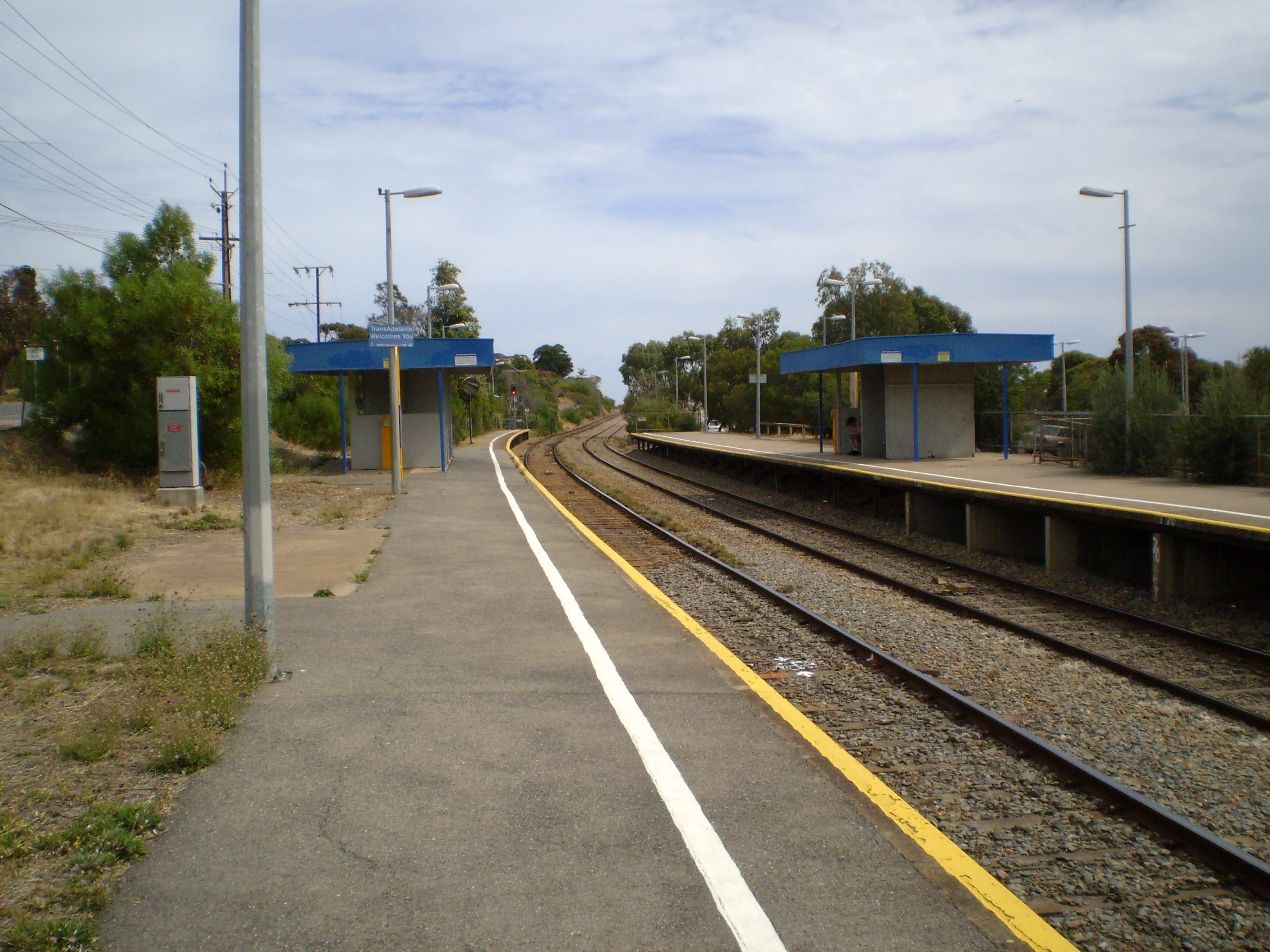
Marino Rocks station (1970–2011) in March 2008

The station is one of the most historic on the line and was initially opened as part of the Willunga railway extension to the Brighton line in 1915, allowing people from inner-Adelaide to visit the surrounding clifftop coastline and beach.

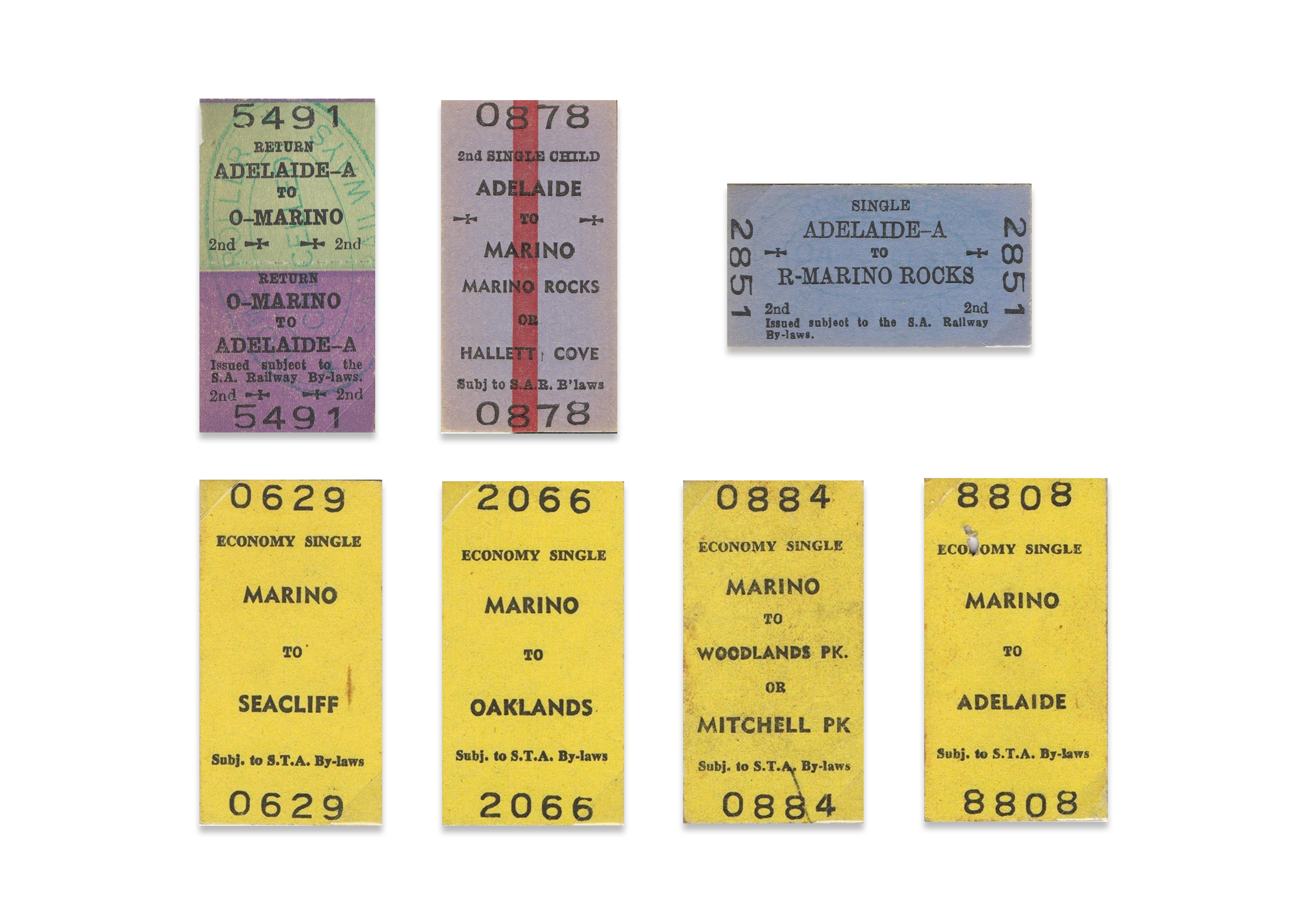
Collection of Marino Rocks train tickets .

The station was rebuilt in 1970 and received a minor upgrade in February 2011 when the line was closed for six months to allow for upgrade works between Oaklands and Noarlunga.

On 2 January 2013, the station was closed again with the whole Seaford line, to allow for its electrification and extension, with trains being replaced by bus services. Rail services resumed at Marino Rocks on 1 December 2013 with electric trains entering service at the station for the first time.

=== Renewal ===
In October and November 2019, the Seaford bound platform at Marino Rocks station underwent extensive landscaping initiated by the Department for Infrastructure and Transport which increased visibility, safety and security of the station from the adjacent streets, as well as improving its appearance. Further improvements were made over the course of 2020 to the city-bound platform with new planting and irrigation, along with new seating installed in November 2020 along various points of the platform.

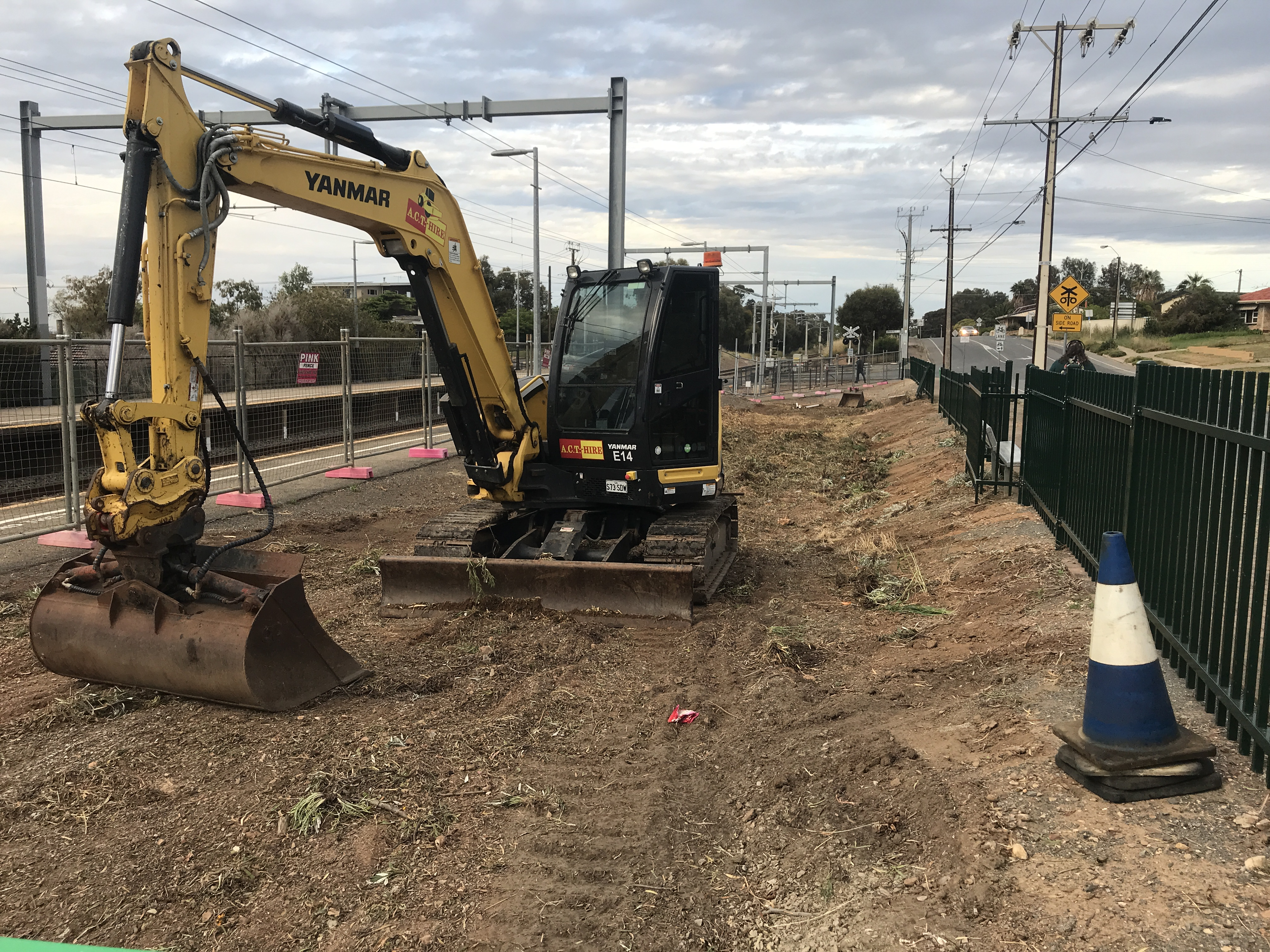
Landscaping and earthworks at Marino Rocks station

The station is now described as “the prettiest station in South Australia” by the Environment Minister during a visit with the Transport Minister.

== Rail Care Community Volunteers ==
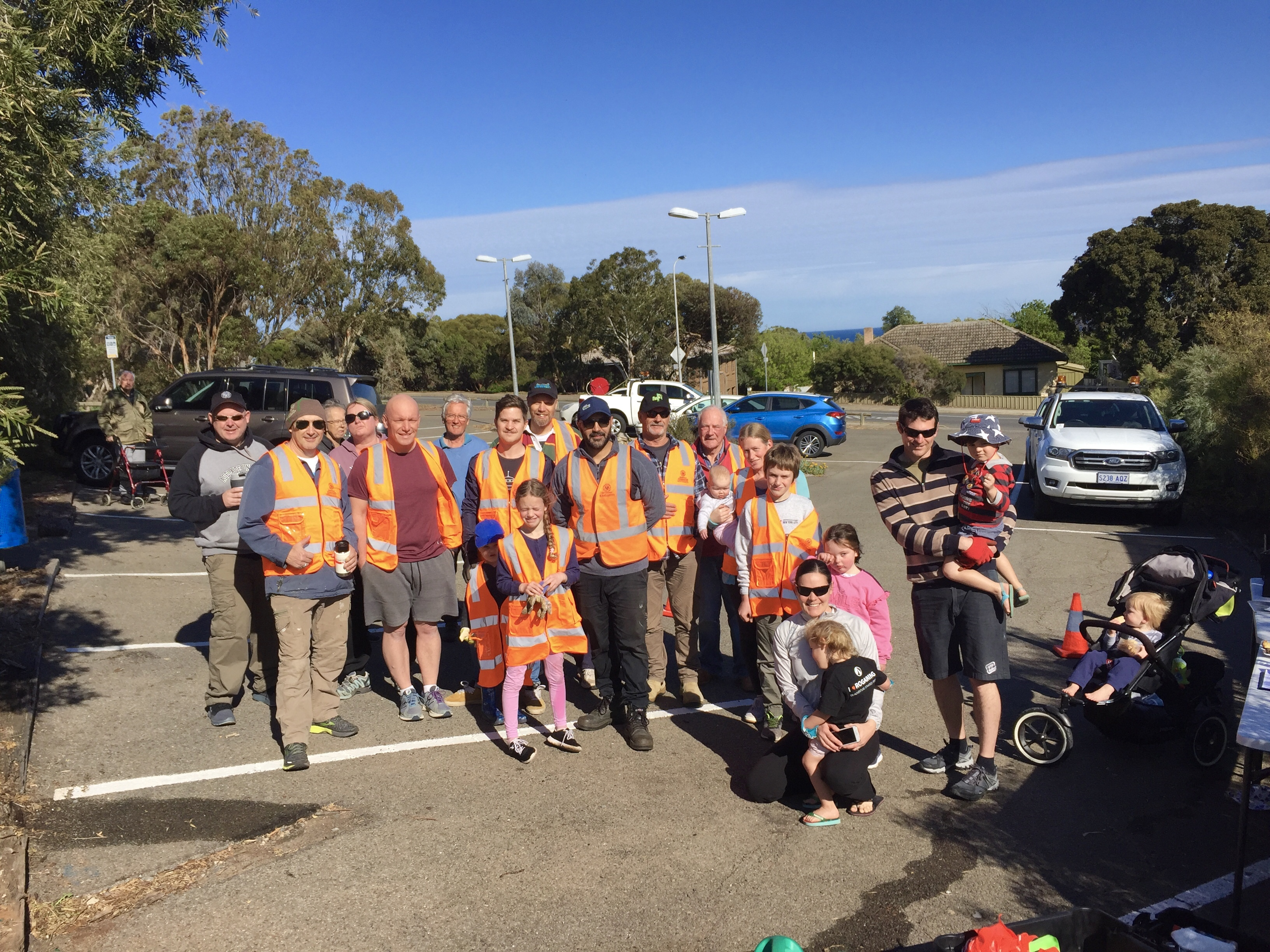
Marino Rocks Rail Care volunteers

The station is cared for by dozens of local volunteers in Marino Rocks, as part of the South Australian Government's Rail Care Program.

Working bees are held at the Marino Rocks with participation from the Marino community, supported by state and local government.

== Neighbouring attractions ==
This station is used by visitors to the Marino Conservation Park and Lighthouse with sea and city views, Marino Rocks beach, the refurbished playground and sporting facilities at Bandon Reserve, the famous cliff top Marino to Hallett Cove Boardwalk and the extended Adelaide Coast Park coastal walk between Marino Rocks and Seacliff. The station is well used by cyclists, with the Coast to Vines Rail Trail starting at the station then following the former Willunga railway alignment south to McLaren Vale wine region. The Marino Rocks Greenway also starts at Marino Rocks station and provides a cycling route near the inward-bound railway line into the heart of Adelaide.

To further support the numerous visitors who get off at Marino Rocks station, DPTI and Marion Council signage was installed on each platform in November 2019, featuring station history, map of attractions, photos and local community artwork. When visitors are exploring the area, official Adelaide Metro signage can be found with directions back to Marino Rocks train station e.g. from the Conservation Park, Coast to Vines trail and Marino Rocks beach etc.

== Station artwork ==
In December 2019, the Marino community worked with Splashout Art Studios in Marino Rocks, to create the first ever station art gallery. Artwork featured local attractions and was hung to be highly visible to commuters on the train.

Marino Rocks station art gallery has since grown to over 20 pieces of artwork created by local artists, children and their families. The latest batch of artwork was hung in March 2021 by the school children of Seacliff Primary School.

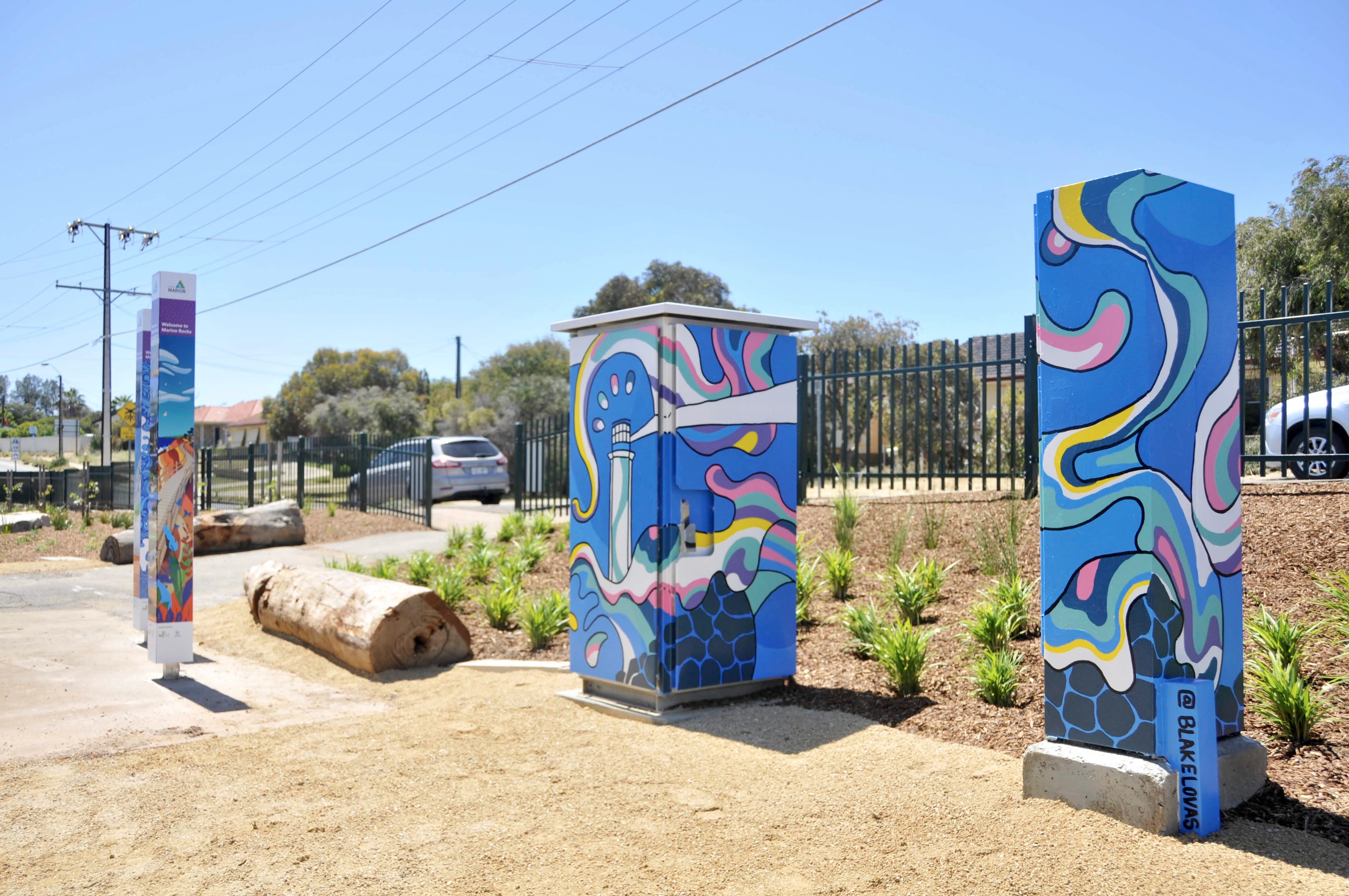
Marino Rocks station artwork by Blake Lovas

In July 2019, artwork by Adelaide artist Blake Lovas was completed at the station as part of the stations Rail Care community volunteer program. Further artworks were created by Seacliff Primary school children in March 2021 following a school presentation on the Marino Rocks Rail Care program and to help promote the school value of "Community".

== Services by platform ==
Platform	Destination
1	Seaford
2	Adelaide

== Gallery ==
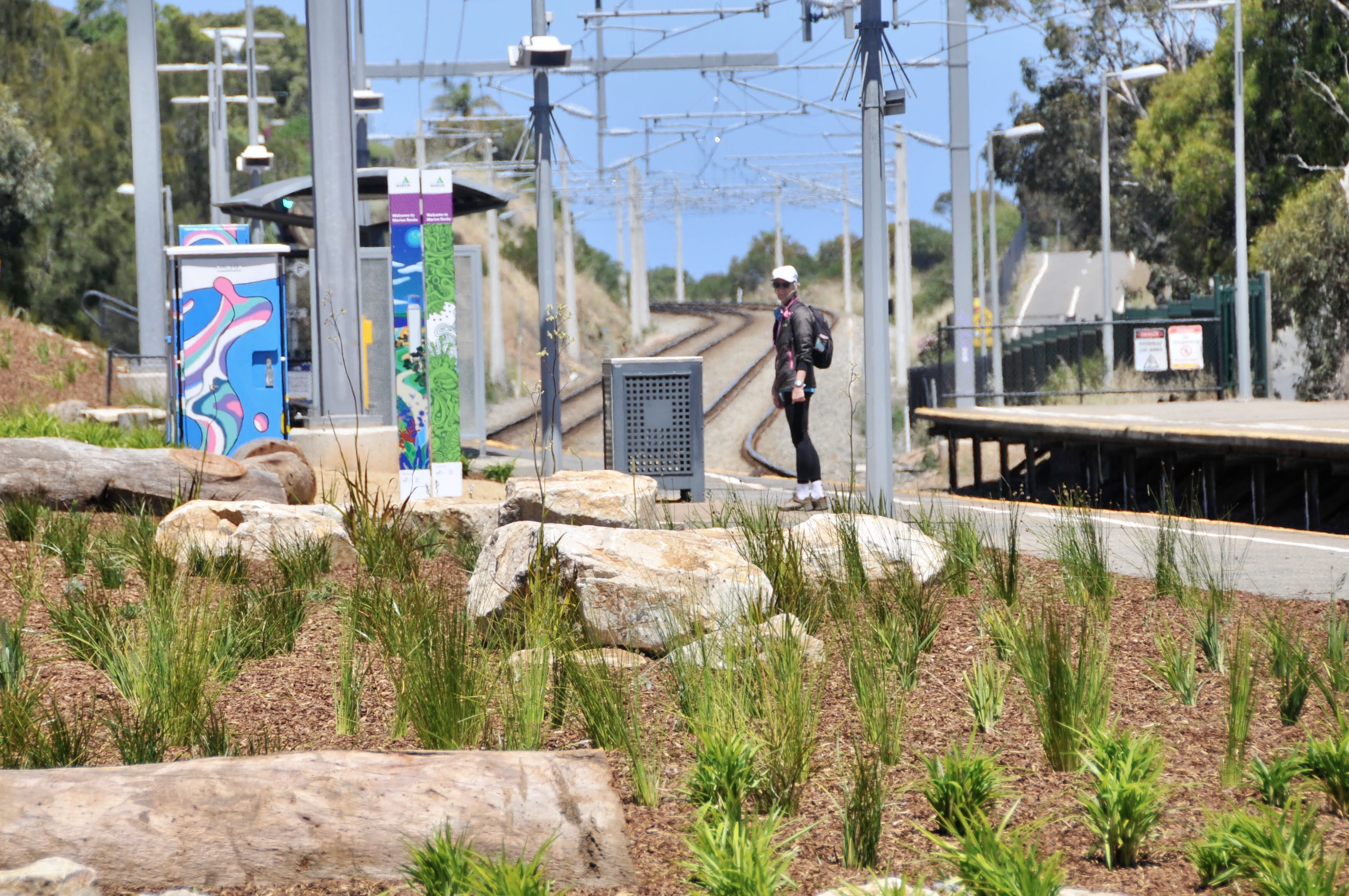
General view of Marino Rocks station

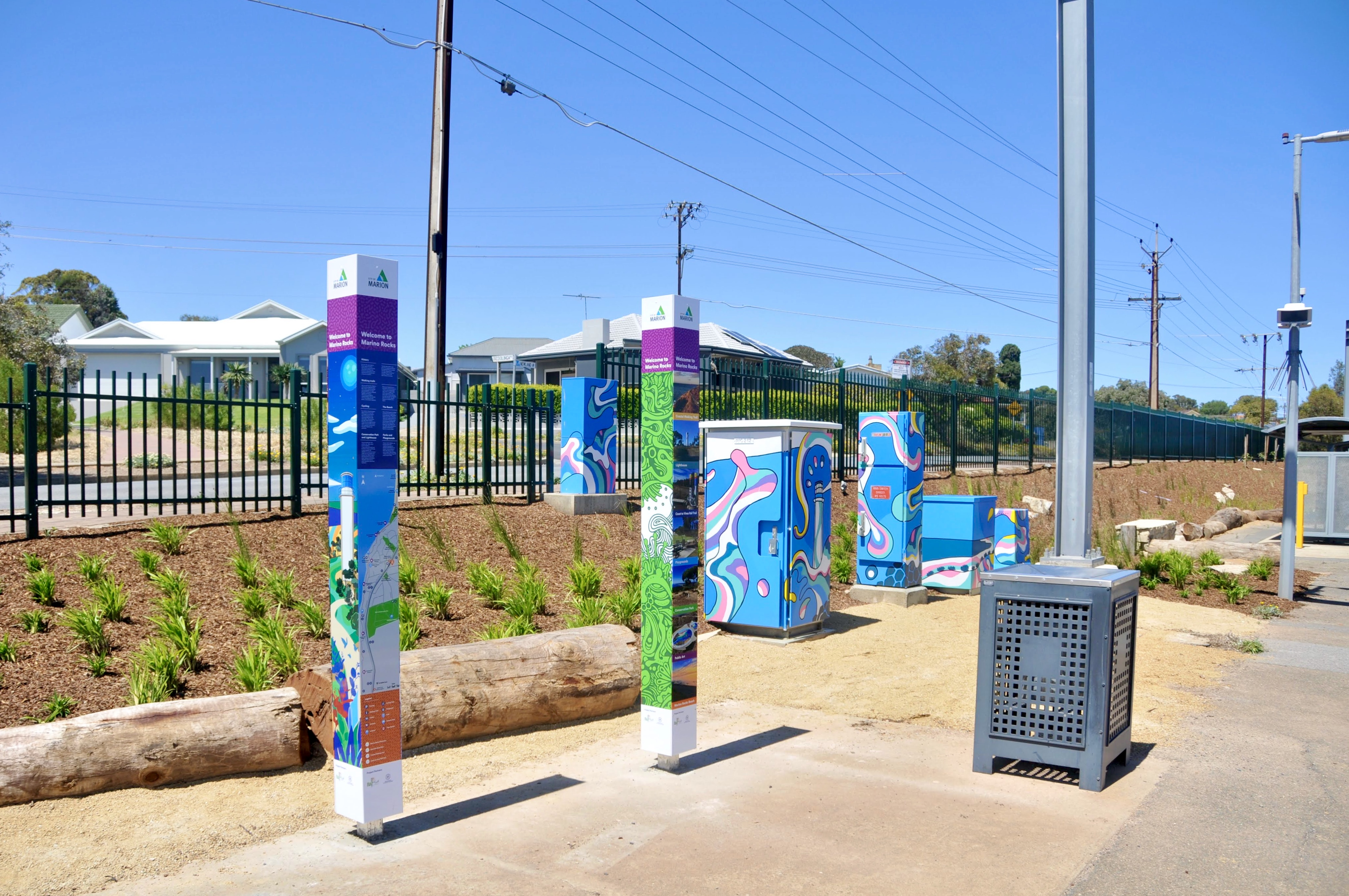
Marino Rocks visitor signage

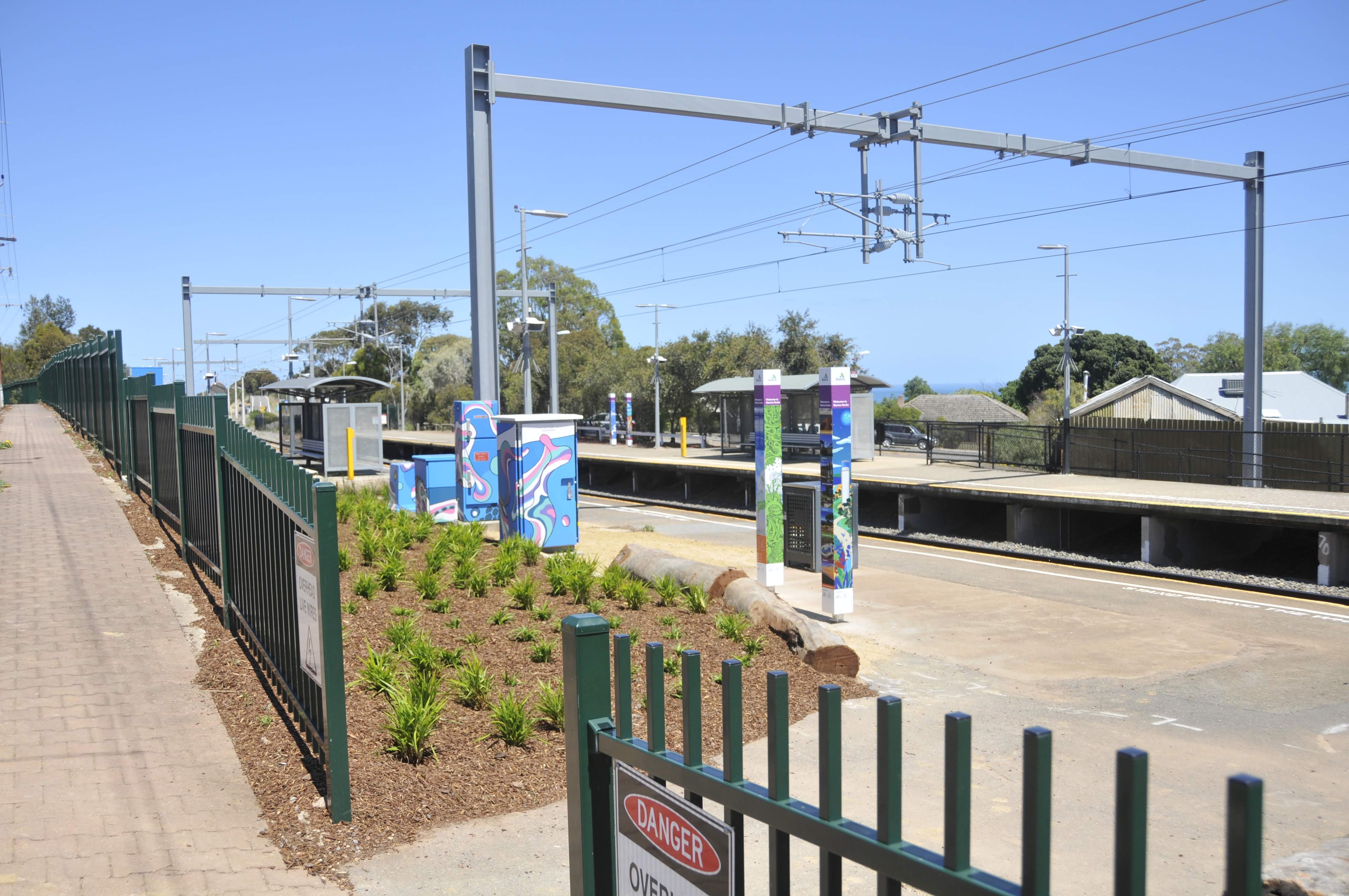
Main entrance into Marino Rocks station

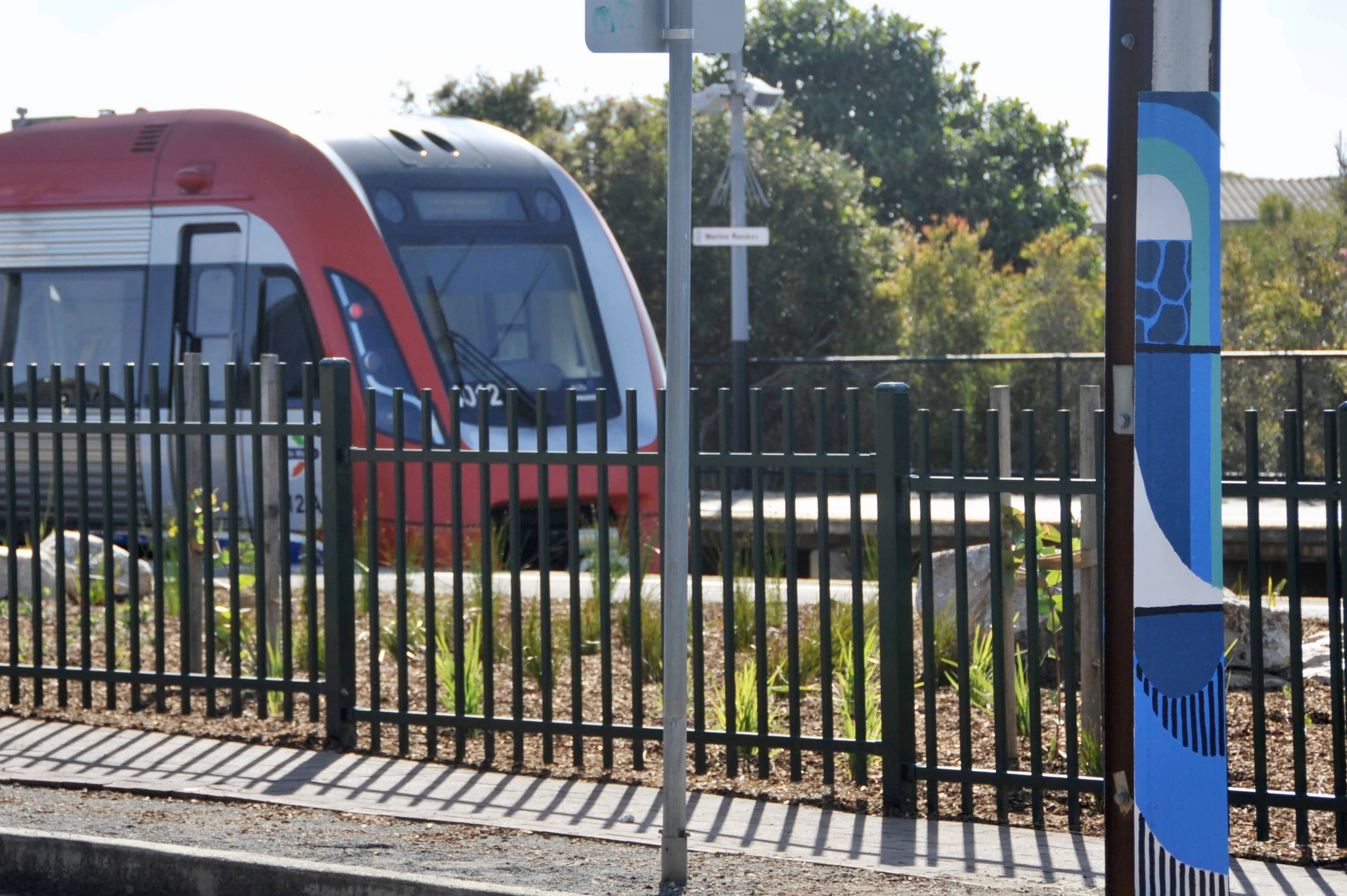
Artwork paid for and organised by the Marino community, outside Marino Rocks station.

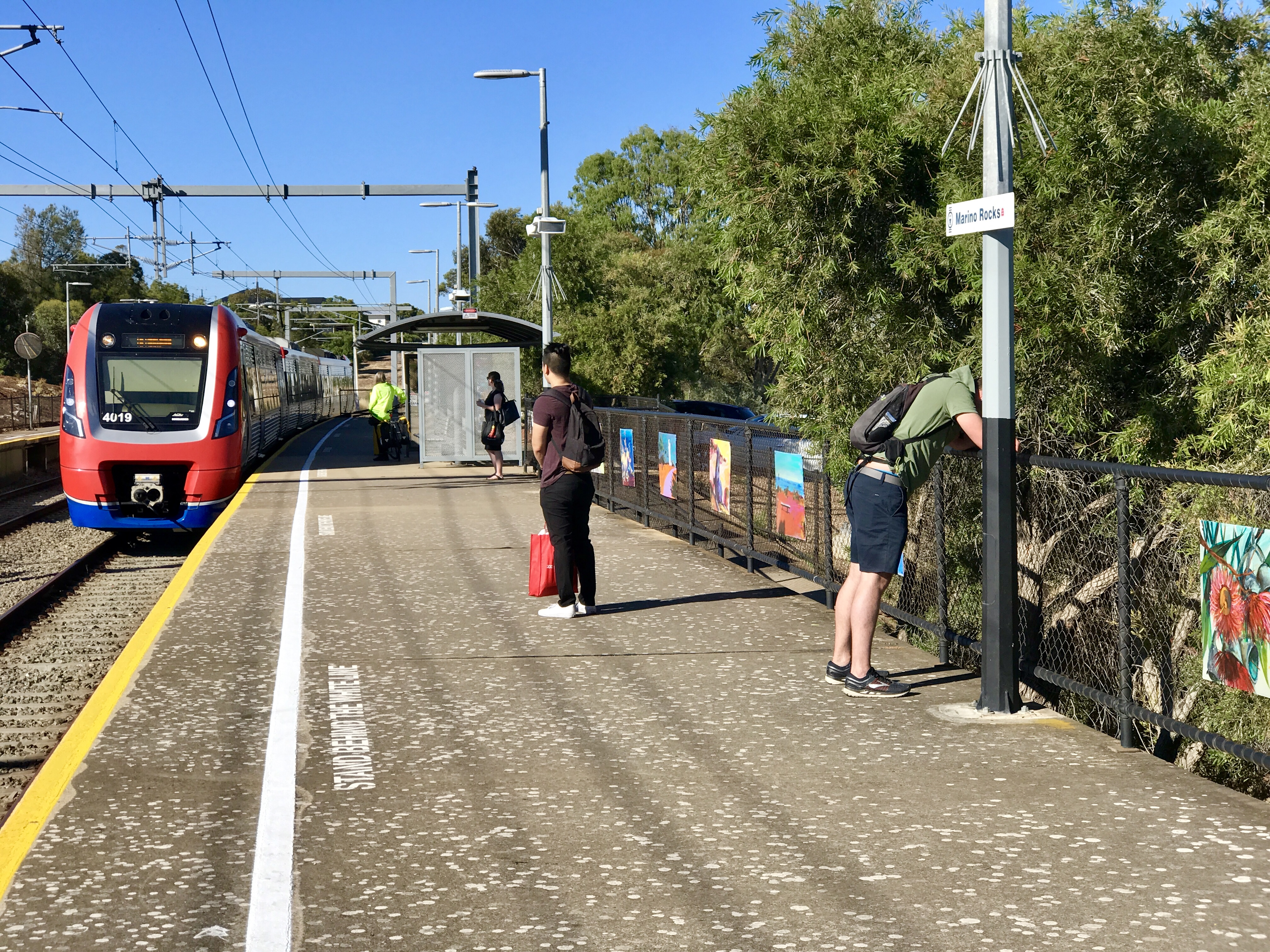
Splashout Art Studio artwork on display at Marino Rocks station.

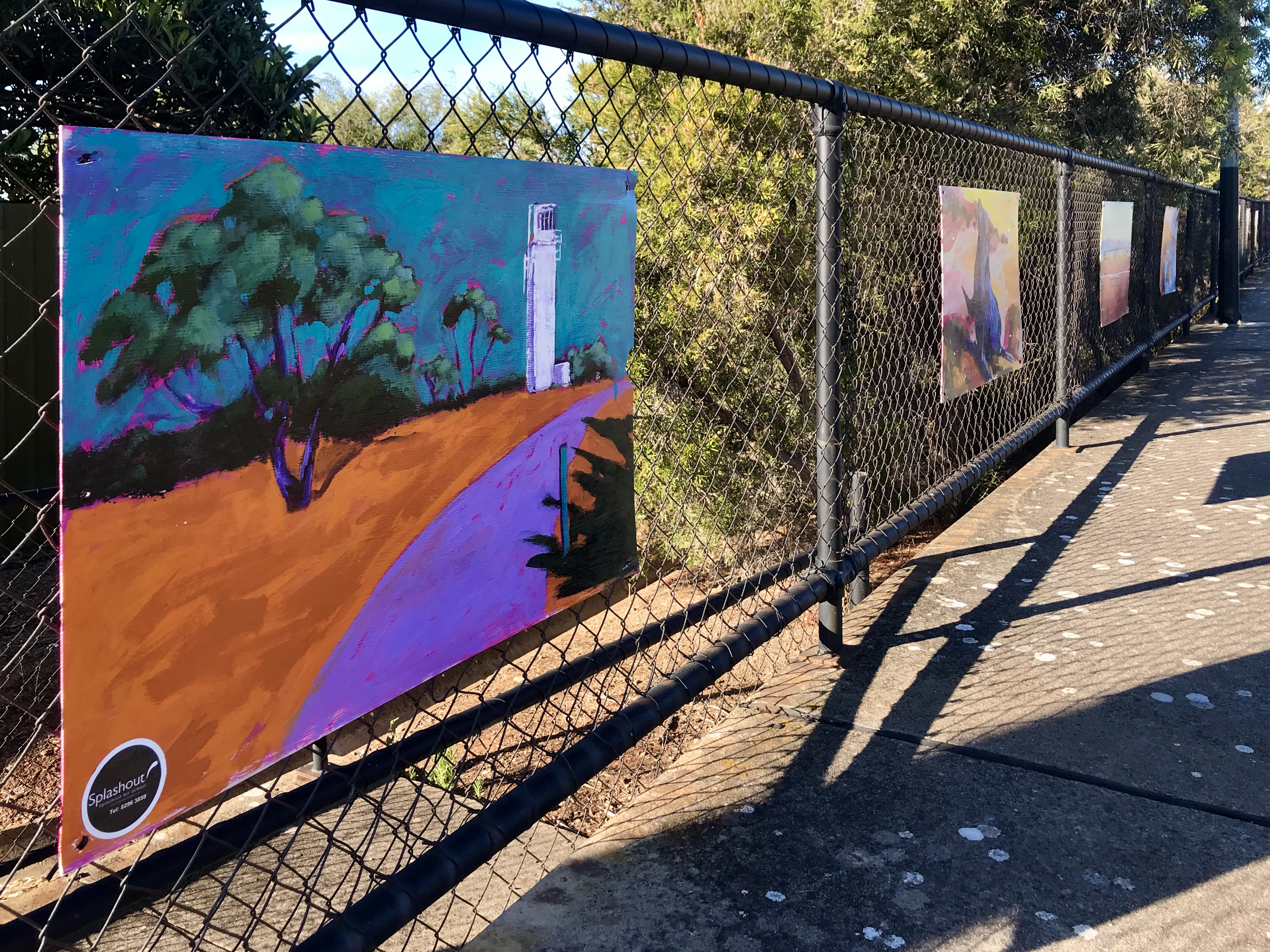
Splashout Art Studio artwork on display at Marino Rocks station.

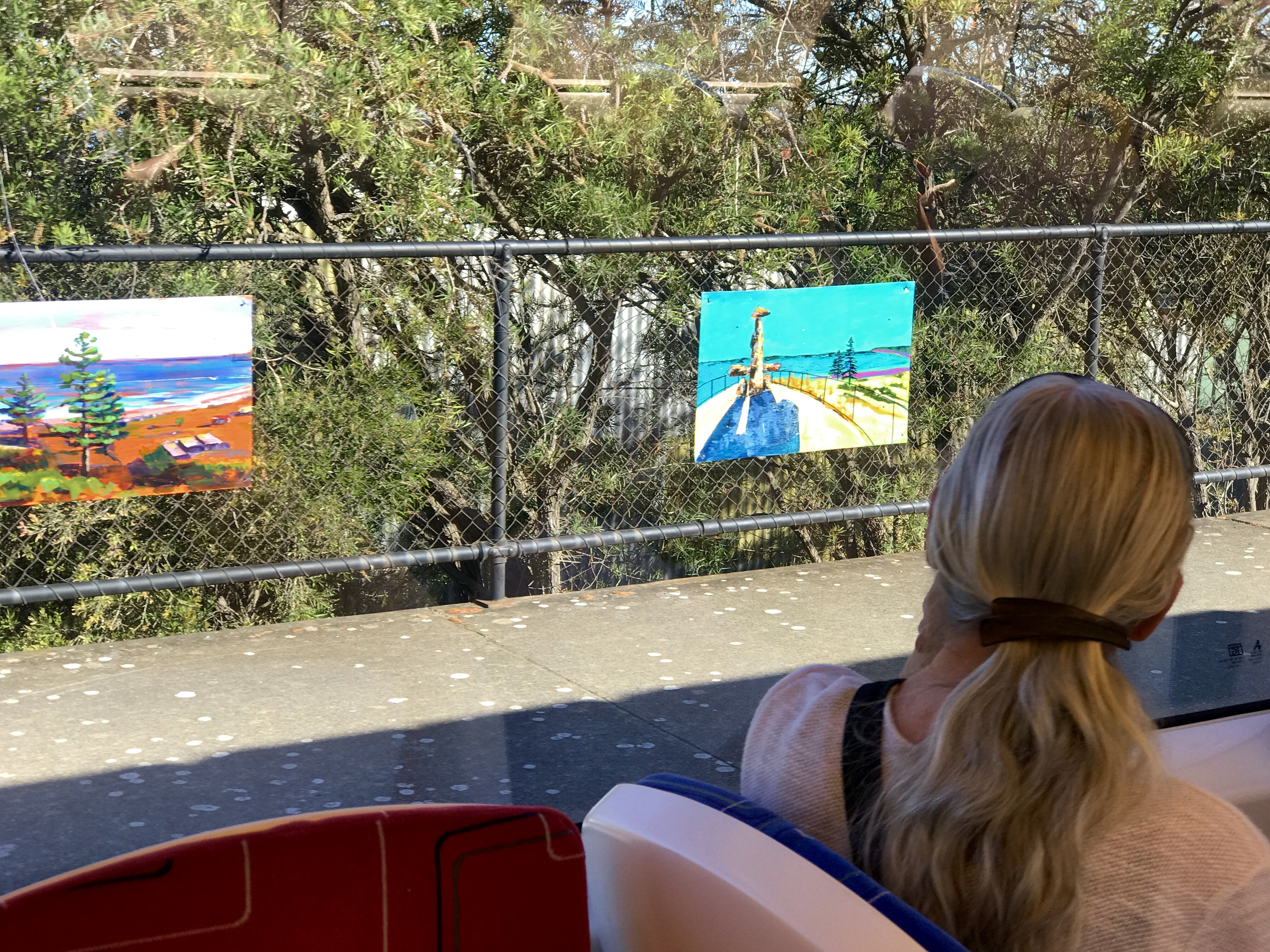
Splashout Art Studio artwork visible from the train at Marino Rocks station.
