= Seacliff railway station =

Railway station in Adelaide, South Australia

Seacliff
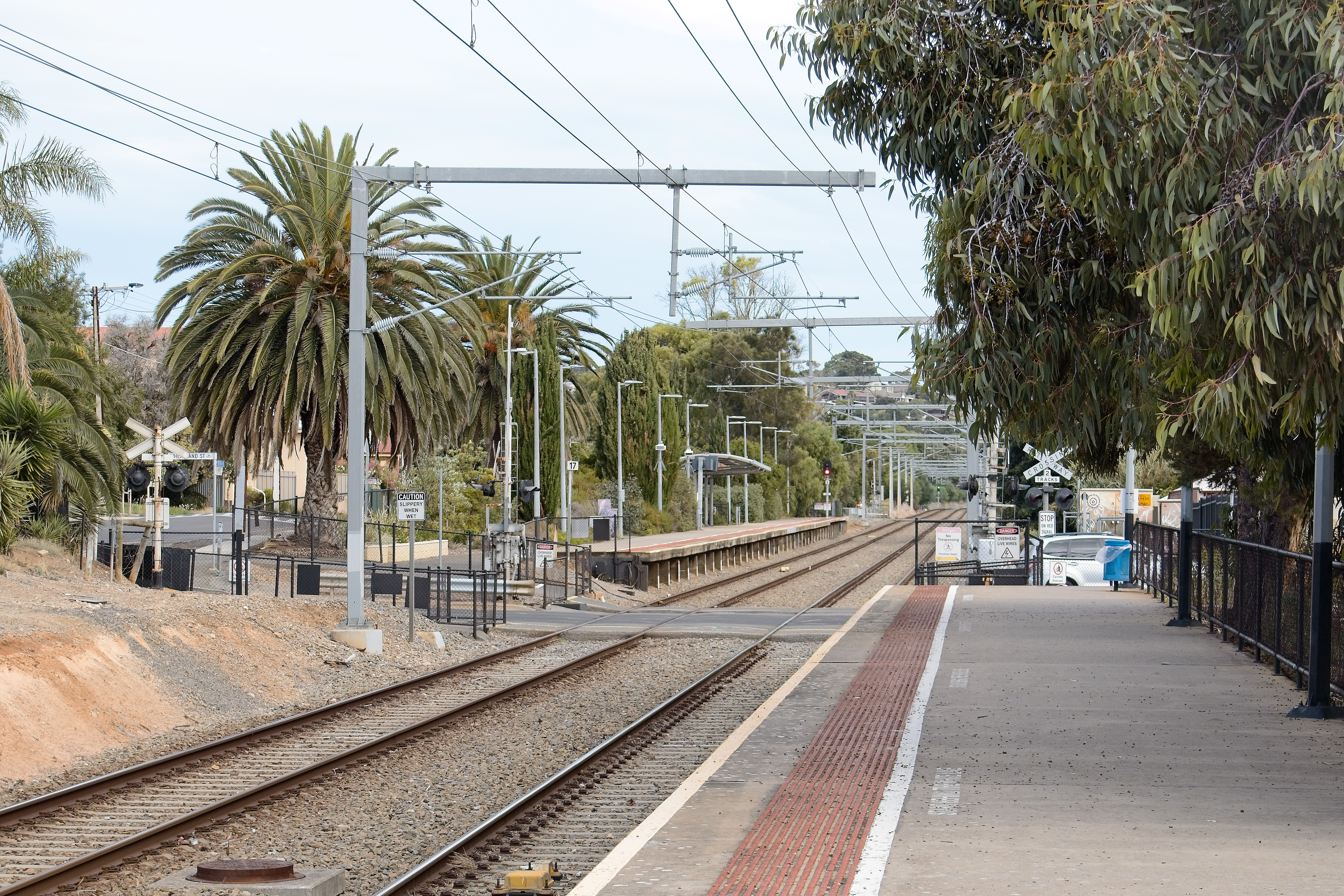
- Northbound view from Platform 1, April 2026

General information
- Location: Wheatland Street, Seacliff
- Coordinates: 35°01′51″S 138°31′17″E
- Line: Seaford
- Distance: 17.0 km from Adelaide
- Platforms: 2
- Tracks: 2
- Bus routes: 265 & 957

Construction
- Structure type: Ground
- Parking: Yes
- Cycle facilities: Yes

History
- Opened: 1915
- Rebuilt: 1976

Services
Preceding station	Adelaide Metro	Following station
Brighton towards Adelaide	Seaford line	Marino towards Seaford
Location

Seacliff railway station is located on the Seaford line. Situated in the southwestern Adelaide suburb of Seacliff, it is 17 kilometres from Adelaide station.

== History ==
Seacliff was opened in 1915. The station originally only had one platform until a second opened in 1976 when the Seaford line was extended to Christie Downs.

The platforms are divided, being located on opposite sides of Wheatland Street to minimise the amount of time the level crossing boom gates have to be down.

== Services by platform ==
Platform	Destination/s
1	Seaford
2	Adelaide

== Buses ==
Buses: 265 via Seacliff Station to Marion.
