= Seaford Meadows railway station =

Railway station in Adelaide, South Australia

Seaford Meadows
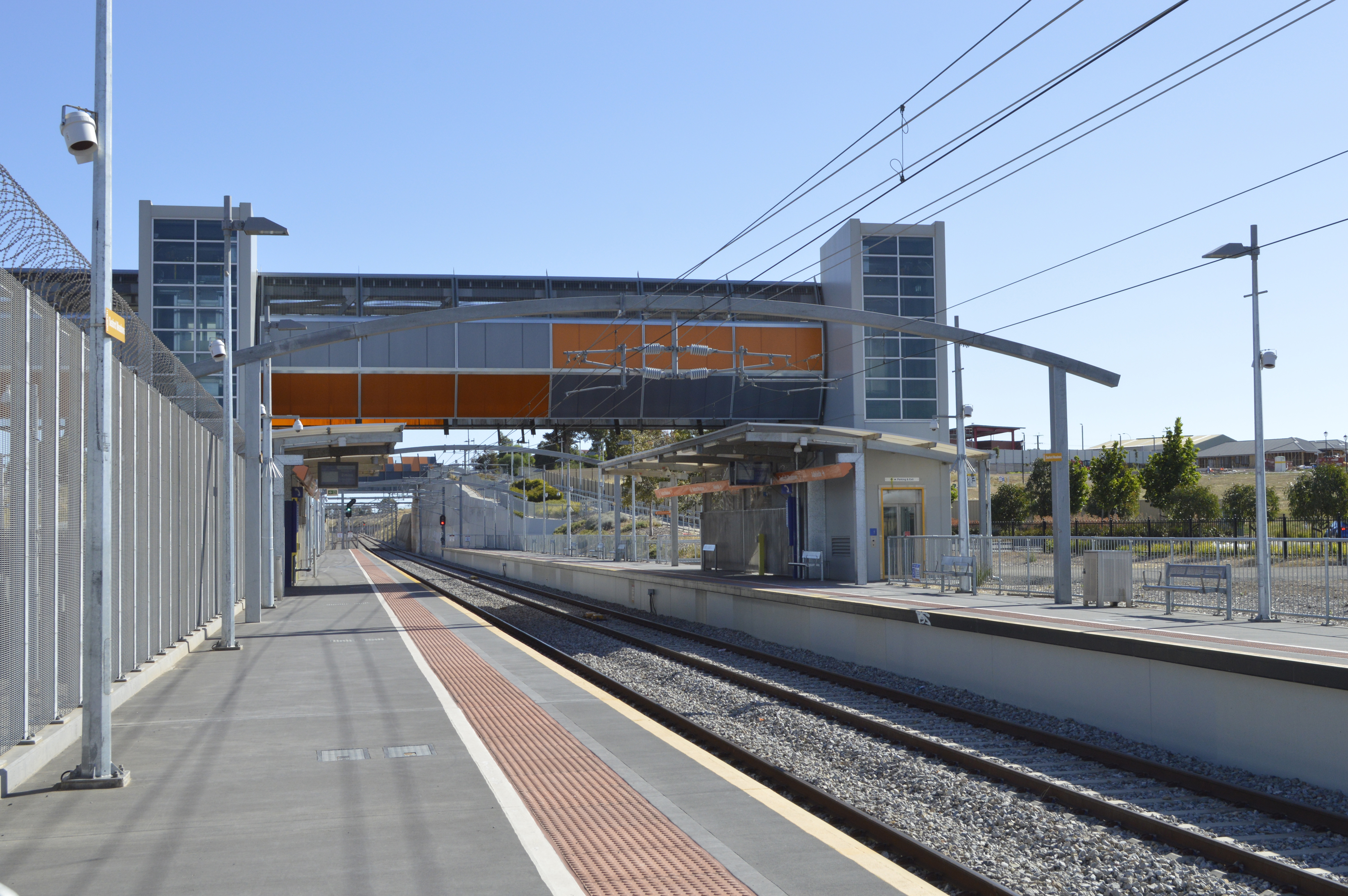
- Southbound view from Platform 2, January 2018

General information
- Location: Teakle Road, Seaford Meadows
- Coordinates: 35°10′44″S 138°29′15″E
- Owner: Department for Infrastructure & Transport
- Operator: Adelaide Metro
- Line: Seaford
- Distance: 34.7 km from Adelaide
- Platforms: 2

Construction
- Structure type: Ground
- Parking: Yes
- Cycle facilities: Yes

History
- Opened: 23 February 2014

Services
Preceding station	Adelaide Metro	Following station
Noarlunga Centre towards Adelaide	Seaford line	Seaford Terminus
Location

Seaford Meadows railway station is located on the Seaford line in South Australia. Situated in the southern Adelaide suburb of Seaford Meadows, it is 34.7 kilometres from Adelaide station.

== History ==
Seaford Meadows station opened on 23 February 2014 as part of the extension of the line from Noarlunga Centre to Seaford. It is located in a triangular section of land between Seaford and Dungeys Roads. The rail line between Seaford Road and Griffiths Drive follows a similar alignment to the former Willunga railway line (now the Coast to Vines Rail Trail) and Seaford Meadows station is located approximately 800m from the site of the former Noarlunga railway station, which is marked by a rest point on the trail.

The station has two side platforms connected via an overhead walkway. Lifts and stairs enable passengers to move between the walkway and the platforms. A 550 space park & ride area is provided, as well as a kiss & ride facility. A train stabling depot and maintenance facility has been provided adjacent to the station.

== Services by platform ==
Platform	Destination/s
1	Seaford
2	Adelaide
