= Seaford line =

Railway line in Adelaide, South Australia

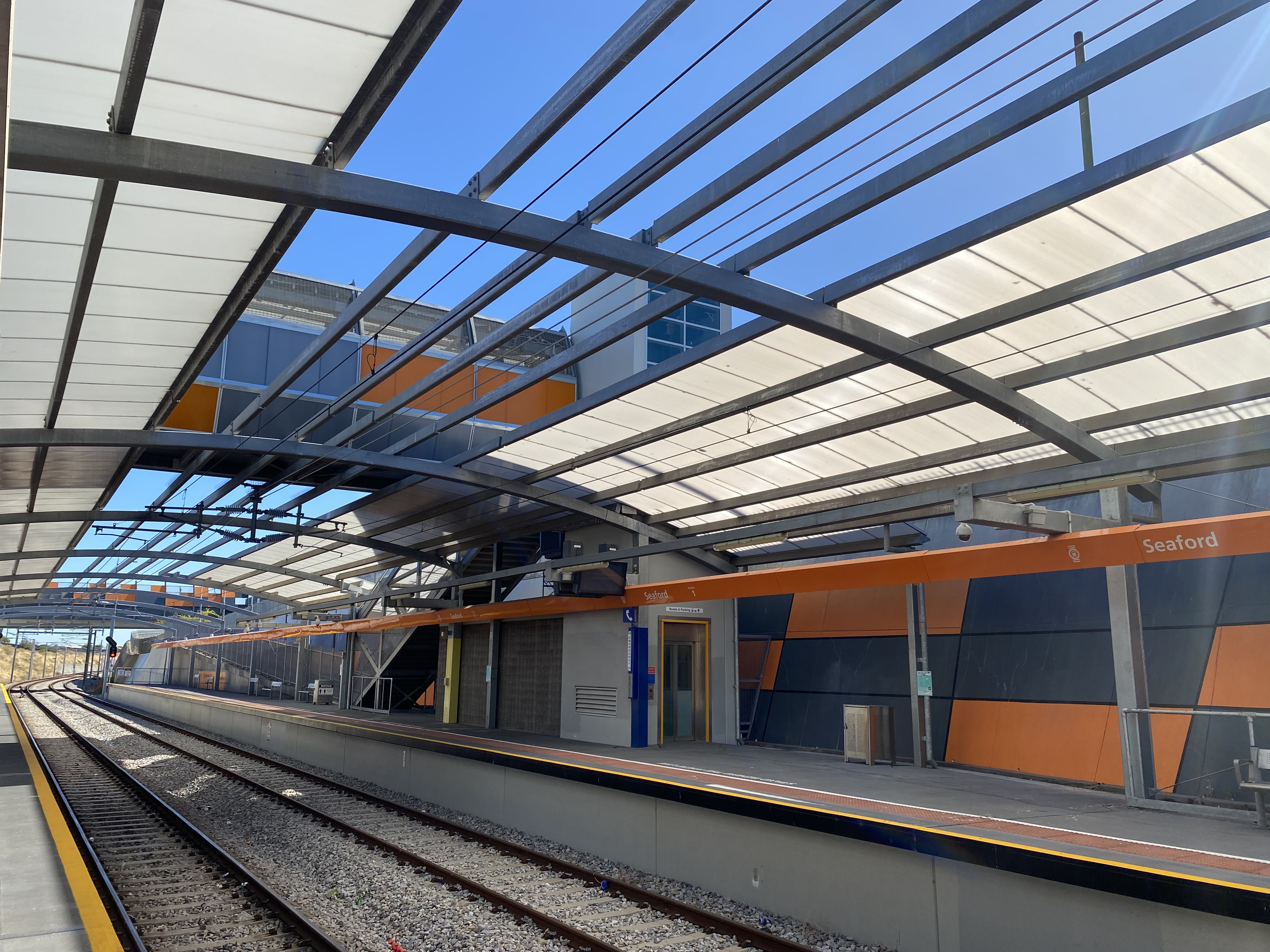
- Seaford railway station, the terminus of the line, January 2023

Overview
- Locale: Adelaide, South Australia
- Termini: Adelaide; Seaford
- Stations: 24

Service
- Type: Commuter rail
- Route number: NOAR, SEAFRD
- Operator: Adelaide Metro
- Rolling stock: 3000/3100; 4000

History
- Opened: 1913 (to Marino); 1974 (to Hallett Cove Beach); 1976 (to Christie Downs); 1978 (to Noarlunga Centre); 2014 (to Seaford)
- Re-sleepered (concrete): 2009–2011
- Electrified: January 2013–14

Technical
- Line length: 35.9 km (22.3 mi)
- Num of tracks: 2
- Track gauge: 1,600 mm (5 ft 3 in)
- Electrification: 25 kV 50 Hz AC from overhead catenary
- Operating speed: Up to 110 kilometres per hour (68 mph)

The Seaford line is a commuter railway line in the city of Adelaide, South Australia. It is the city's second longest metropolitan railway line at 35.9 kilometres (22.3 mi).

== History ==
Before the extension of the line to Noarlunga Centre in 1978, the Willunga line ran from Hallett Cove station on a different route through Reynella, Morphett Vale and Hackham to Willunga (south-east of Noarlunga). It closed in 1969 and in September 1972 a track-removal train removed the tracks, and for six years Noarlunga had no train service.

The South Australian Railways and its successor, the State Transport Authority, extended the current railway southwards in stages from Hallett Cove to cater for increasing residential development in the southern area. Opening dates for passenger services were: Hallett Cove Beach on 30 June 1974; Christie Downs on 25 January 1976 (This was a temporary terminus just north of Beach Road and adjacent to Hyacinth Crescent, and was in a different location to the current Christie Downs station, which opened in November 1981.); and Noarlunga Centre on 2 April 1978.

Prior to 2014, most trains were operated by 3000 class railcars augmented at times by 2000 class railcars. Since the electrification of the line, the latter are no longer authorised to operate on the line. Most services are now operated by 4000 class electric multiple units. A number of railcars needed for peak-hour services are now stabled overnight in secure sidings at Port Stanvac, north of Lonsdale station, and at a much bigger facility adjacent to Seaford Meadows. The last freight trains on the line, to and from Port Stanvac Refinery, ceased in the late 1990s.

=== Re-sleepering and electrification ===
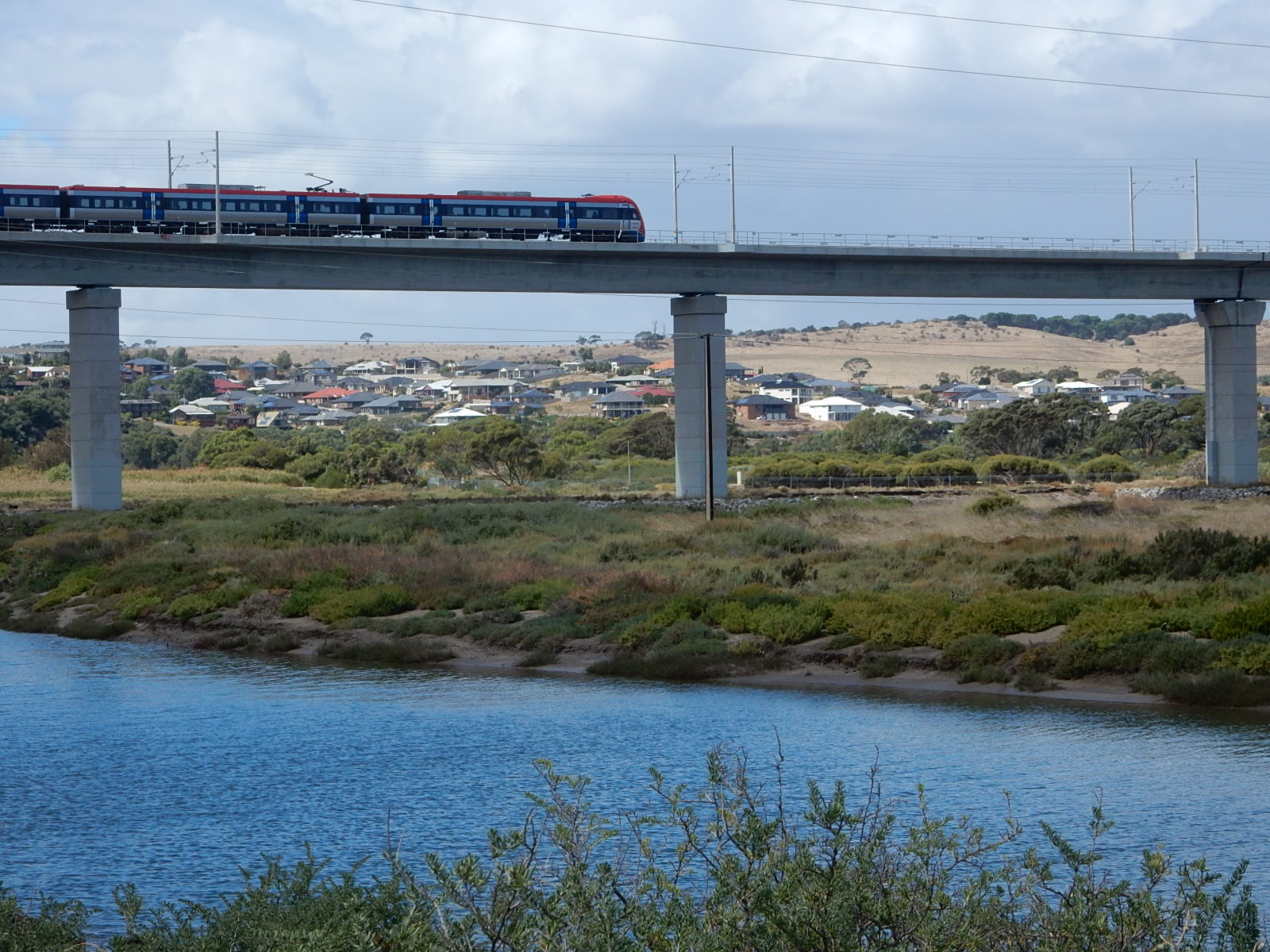
A train from the Seaford railway line travels over a viaduct spanning the Onkaparinga River in March 2017

In 2008, the State Government announced a plan to upgrade and electrify the Seaford line with the Federal Government also to provide funding. In December 2009, Stage 1 of the Noarlunga line upgrade was completed between Adelaide and Brighton. This work saw the track removed, with the track bed and track renewed. Dual gauge sleepers were laid to allow for the line to be converted to standard gauge at a future date. Stage 2 commenced in February 2011 with the line closed for six months and continued the upgrade works between Oaklands and Noarlunga. Most stations (Brighton, Seacliff, Marino, Marino Rocks and Lonsdale) received a minor upgrade due to the presence of asbestos in many station shelters, necessitating their replacement.

On 2 January 2013, the line closed to allow for its electrification and extension, with trains being replaced by bus services. Rail services resumed on 1 December 2013. The completed project was opened by the South Australian Transport and Infrastructure Minister Tom Koutsantonis on 18 January 2014. Electric train services commenced in February 2014 after testing was completed on the line. At the time, only four 4000 class electric multiple units had entered service, so most services continued to be operated by 3000 class railcars.

=== Seaford extension ===
In 2005, the State Government announced the line would be extended 5.5 kilometres (3.4 mi) to the southern suburb of Seaford. The plan was cancelled in December 2007 after a study concluded that the extension could not be justified. The government announced that it would retain the corridor to Aldinga for a possible extension further south in the future. In July 2008, a feasibility study was commissioned by the government into extending the line. This extension was given approval after the federal government announced a $291 million investment in the project as part of the 2009/10 Federal Budget.

Construction started in 2011 with the extension opening on 23 February 2014. The extension included a new 1.2-kilometre (0.75 mi) elevated rail bridge over the Onkaparinga River, a rail bridge over Old Honeypot Drive, and new railway stations at Seaford Meadows and Seaford. New road bridges were also constructed over the extension at Goldsmith Drive, Seaford Road and Lynton Terrace.

=== Future extension ===
On 16 March 2025, South Australian Premier Peter Malinauskas announced that a corridor of land has been reserved for a possible future extension of the Seaford line to Sellicks Beach.

== Route ==
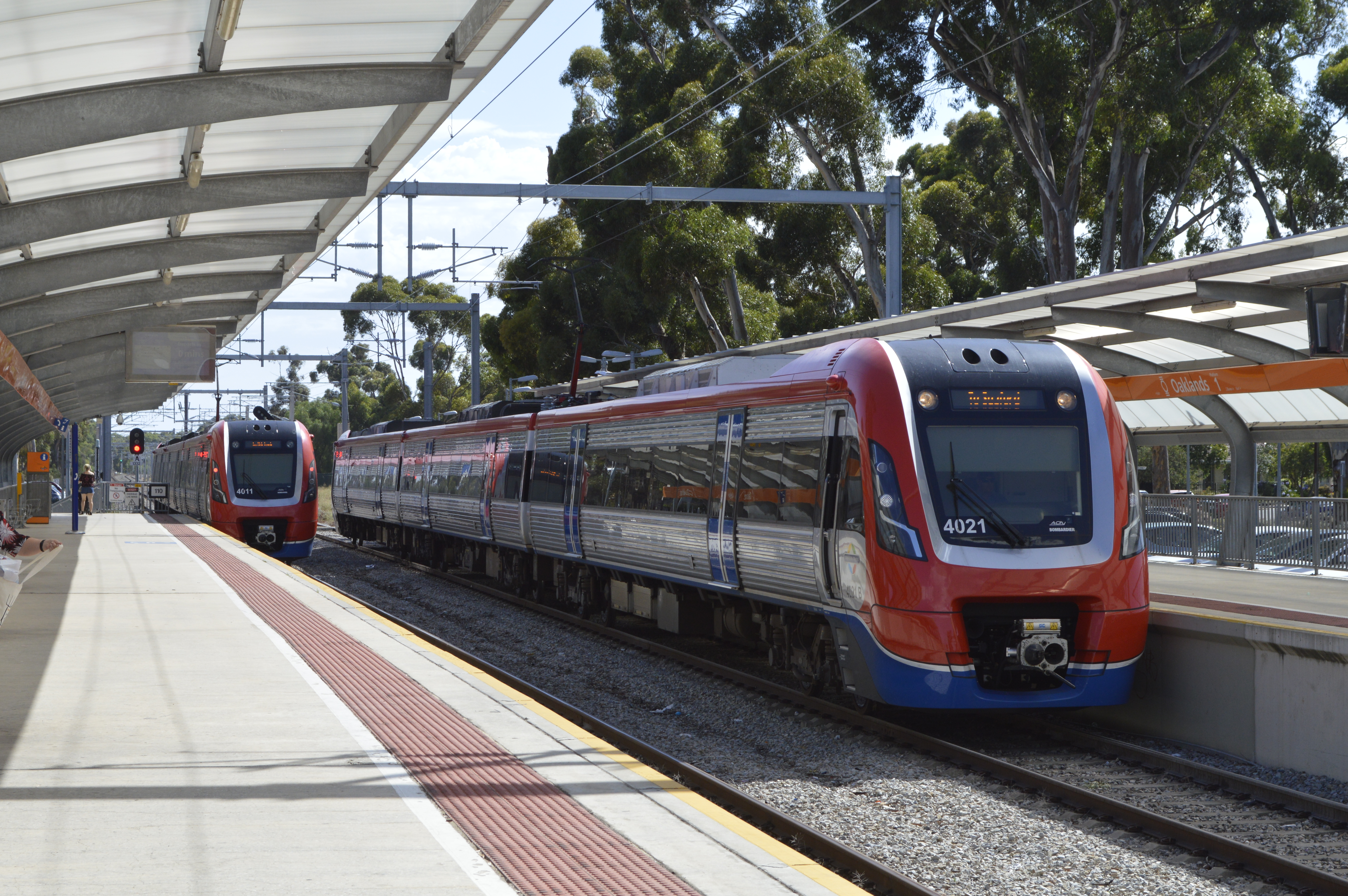
Two Adelaide Metro 4000 Class EMU's at the old Oaklands station in January 2018, prior to grade separation

The line runs south from Adelaide station paralleling the Belair line as far as Goodwood. It then branches off in a south-west direction through the suburbs of Edwardstown, Oaklands Park and Marion to the coast at Brighton, where it turns south towards Noarlunga Centre in the southern suburbs. The line was known as the Marino and Hallett Cove line when it finished at Hallett Cove. Most trains terminated at Marino, with only about a quarter going to Hallett Cove.

Like the rest of the Adelaide network, the line is broad gauge. Dual gauge sleepers have been laid to allow for the line to be converted to standard gauge at a future date. The line is 35.9 kilometres (22.3 mi) long and is the second longest of the Adelaide suburban railway lines. The line is double track throughout. The Australian Rail Track Corporation standard-gauge main line passes over the line just south of Goodwood station, and the Flinders line branches off south of Woodlands Park.

=== Line guide ===
Seaford Line
| Name | Distance from Adelaide | Year opened | Serving suburbs | Connections |
|---|---|---|---|---|
| Adelaide | 0.0 km | 1856 | Adelaide | Gawler Grange; Outer Harbor Port Dock Bus Tram |
| Mile End | 2.0 km | 1898 | Mile End | |
| Adelaide Showground | 4.0 km | 2014 | Keswick, Wayville | |
| Goodwood | 5.0 km | 1883 | Forestville, Goodwood | Belair |
| Clarence Park | 6.3 km | 1913 | Black Forest, Clarence Park | Bus |
| Emerson | 7.1 km | 1928 | Black Forest, Clarence Park | |
| Edwardstown | 7.9 km | 1913 | Edwardstown | |
| Woodlands Park | 9.1 km | 1925 | Ascot Park, Edwardstown | Flinders Bus |
| Ascot Park | 10.2 km | 1914 | Ascot Park | |
| Marion | 11.4 km | 1954 | Marion | |
| Oaklands | 12.9 km | 1913 | Oaklands Park, Warradale | Bus |
| Warradale | 13.7 km | 1956 | Warradale | |
| Hove | 14.6 km | 1914 | Hove | |
| Brighton | 16.0 km | 1913 | Brighton | Bus |
| Seacliff | 17.0 km | 1915 | Seacliff | Bus |
| Marino | 18.3 km | 1913 | Kingston Park, Marino | Bus |
| Marino Rocks | 18.9 km | 1915 | Marino | |
| Hallett Cove | 21.4 km | 1915 | Hallett Cove | Bus |
| Hallett Cove Beach | 22.9 km | 1974 | Hallett Cove | Bus |
| Lonsdale | 26.7 km | 1976 | Lonsdale | |
| Christie Downs | 28.9 km | 1976 | Christie Downs | |
| Noarlunga Centre | 30.2 km | 1978 | Noarlunga Centre | Bus Regional Coach |
| Seaford Meadows | 34.7 km | 2014 | Seaford Meadows | |
| Seaford | 36.0 km | 2014 | Seaford | Bus Regional Coach |

=== Former stations ===
- Keswick – opened 1913, closed 2013.
- Mile End Goods – closed 1994.
- Showground Central – opened 2005 for seasonal use, closed 2013.
- South Brighton – closed 1976.

== Services ==
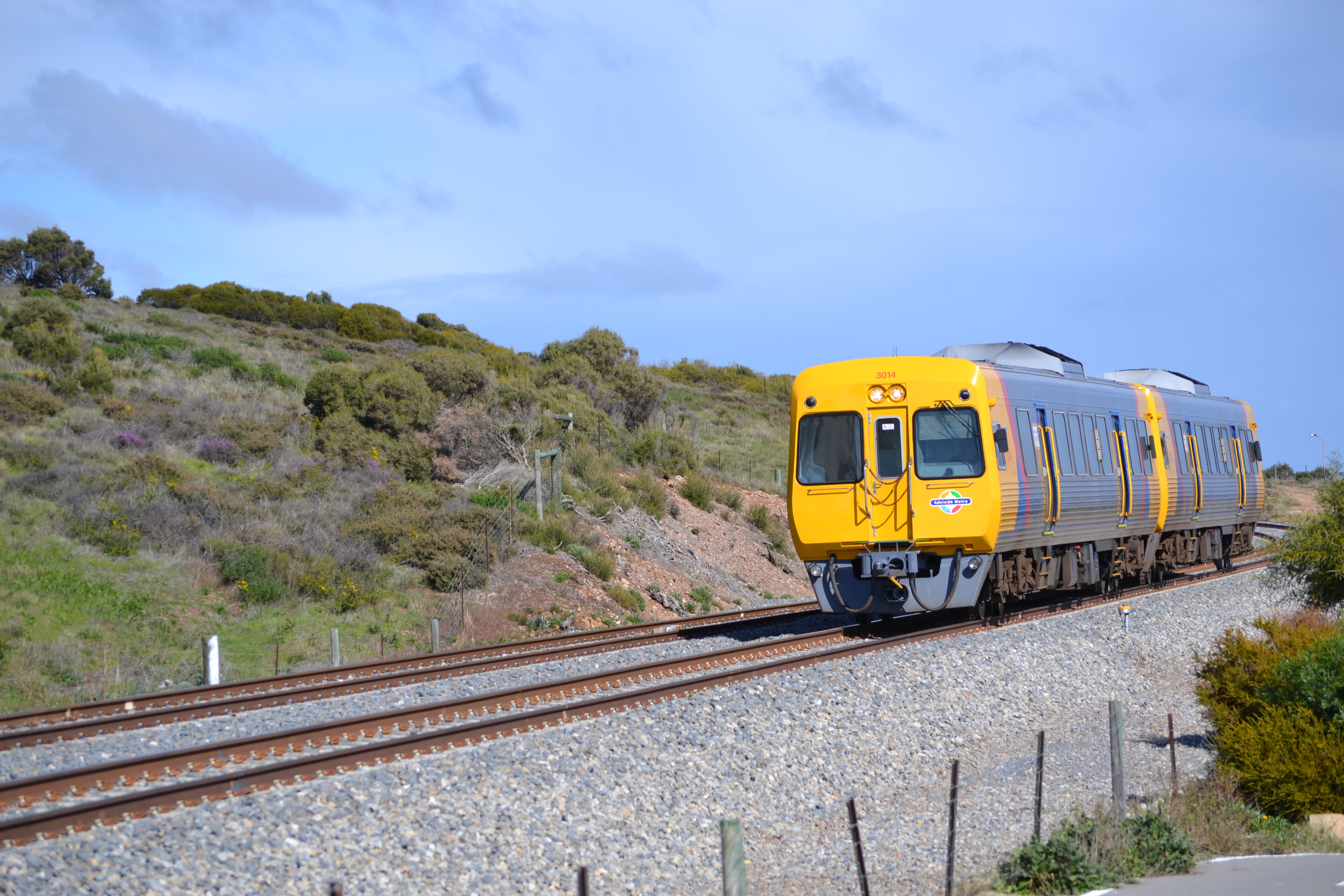
3000 class railcar on the Seaford line before it was electrified, 2011

Trains to and from Adelaide operate every 5–10 minutes during the weekday peak periods, every 10–20 minutes off-peak on weekdays, and every 30 minutes on weekends plus in the late evening. Previously, some stations were also serviced by trains from Brighton and from the Flinders branch line on weekdays.

== Gallery ==
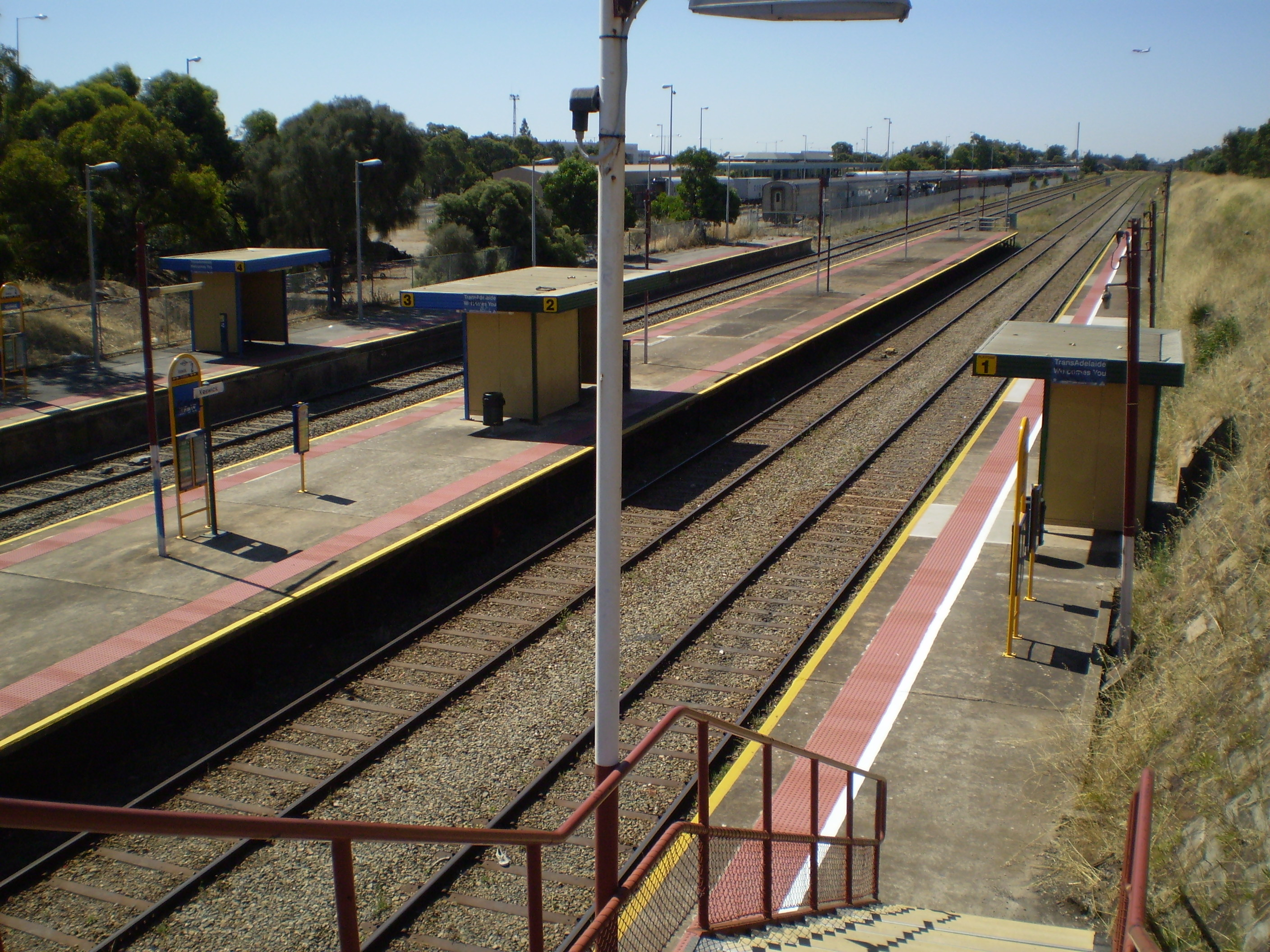
The now demolished Keswick station, with Adelaide Parklands Terminal in the background, 2007

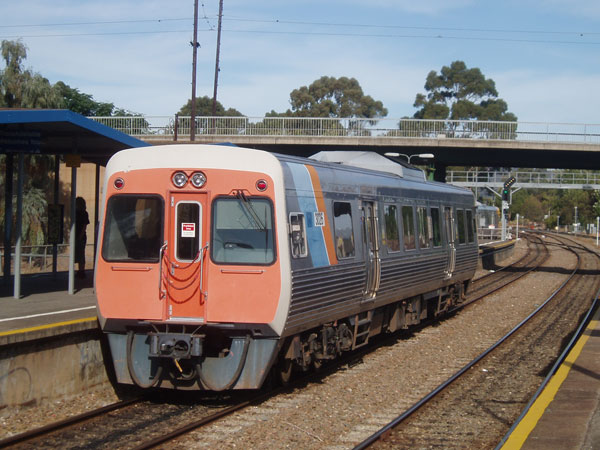
Goodwood station in 2005, with the Goodwood Overpass in the background

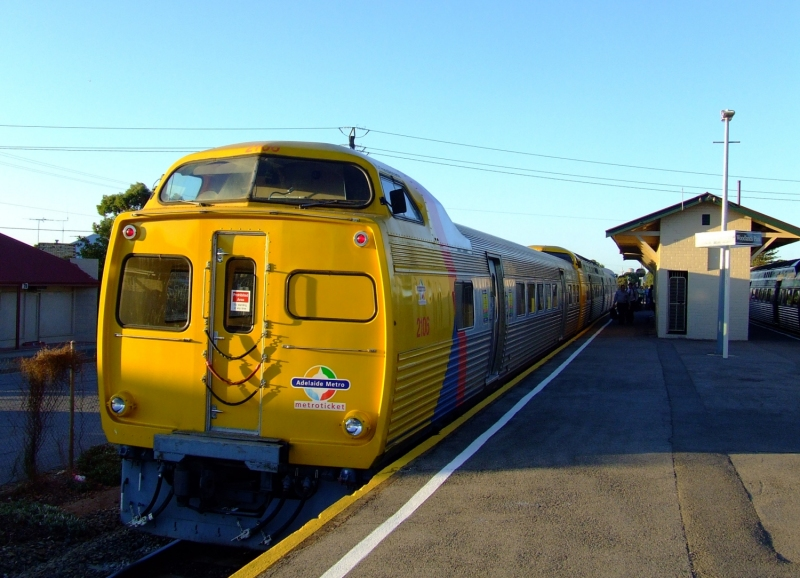
Woodlands Park station, 2007

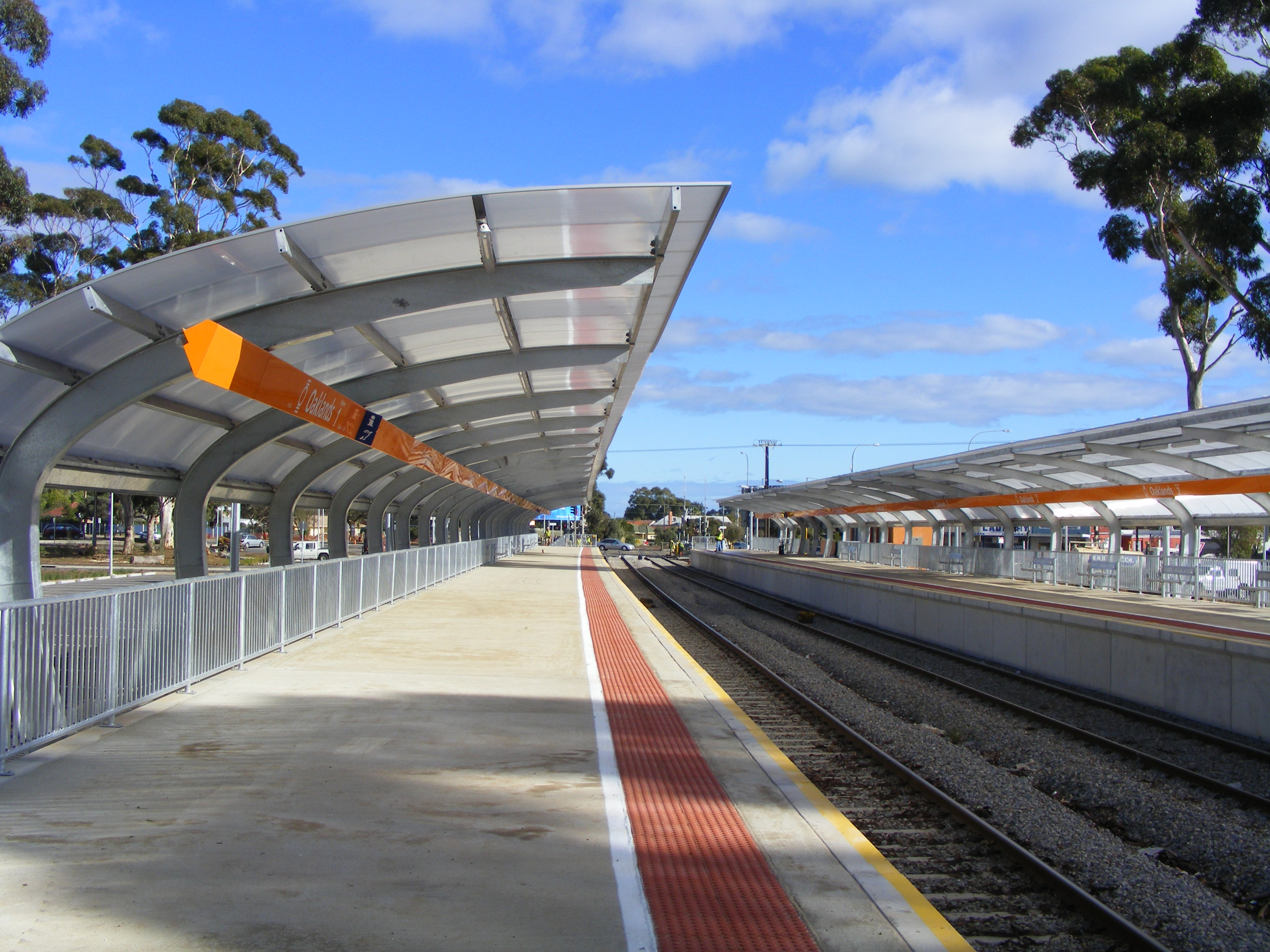
Oaklands station between 2008 and 2019

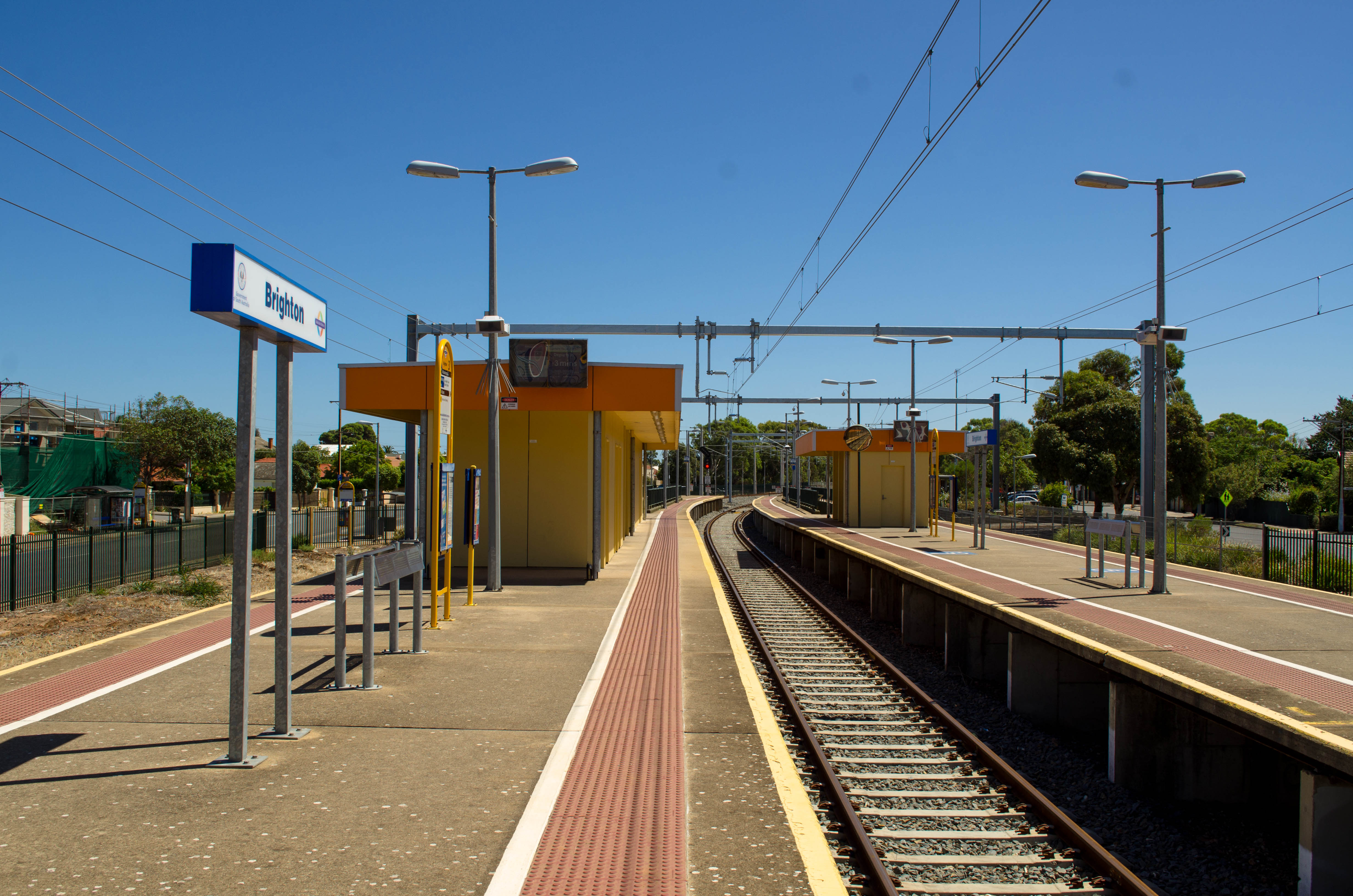
Brighton station, 2014

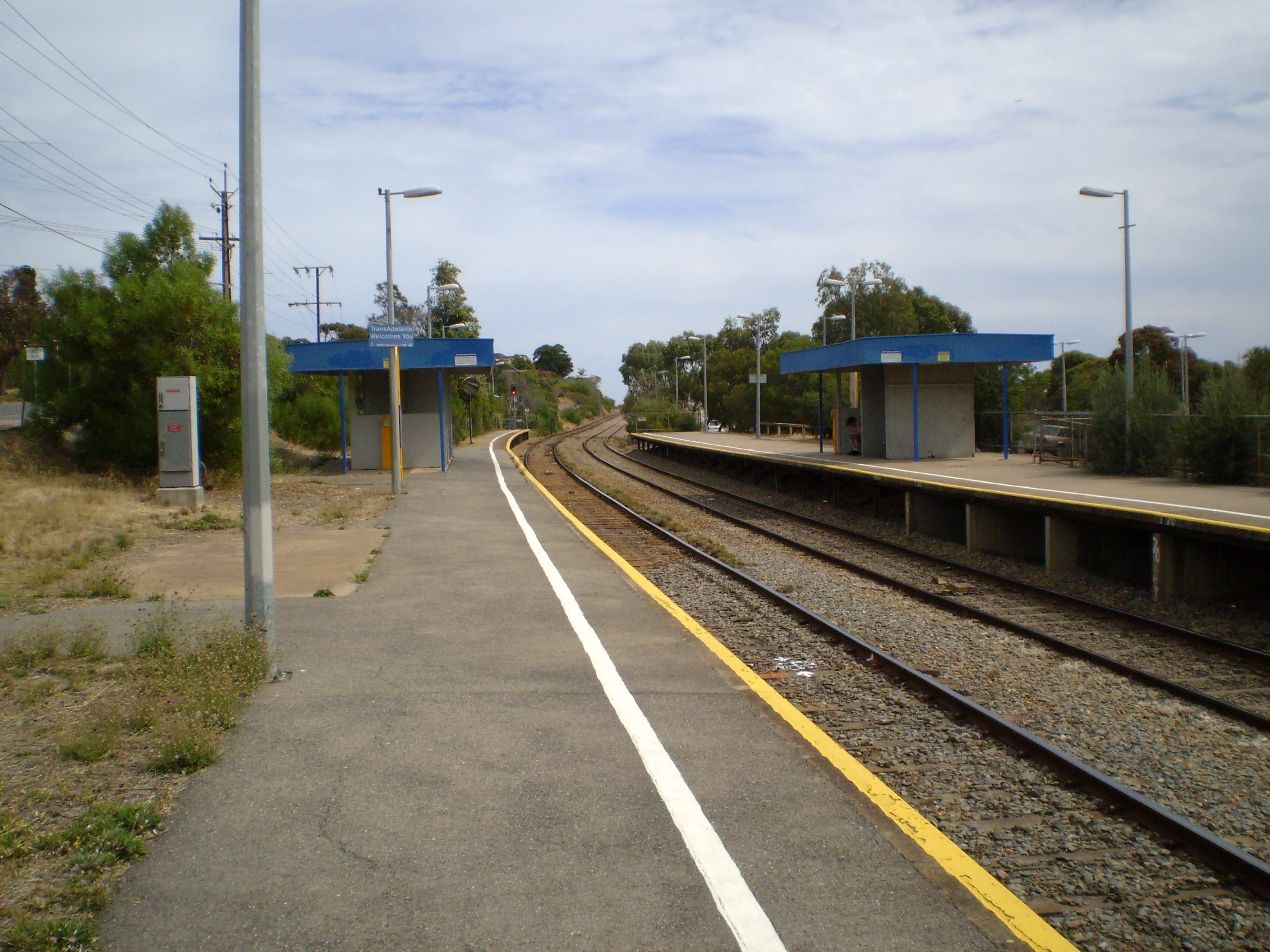
Marino Rocks station, 2008

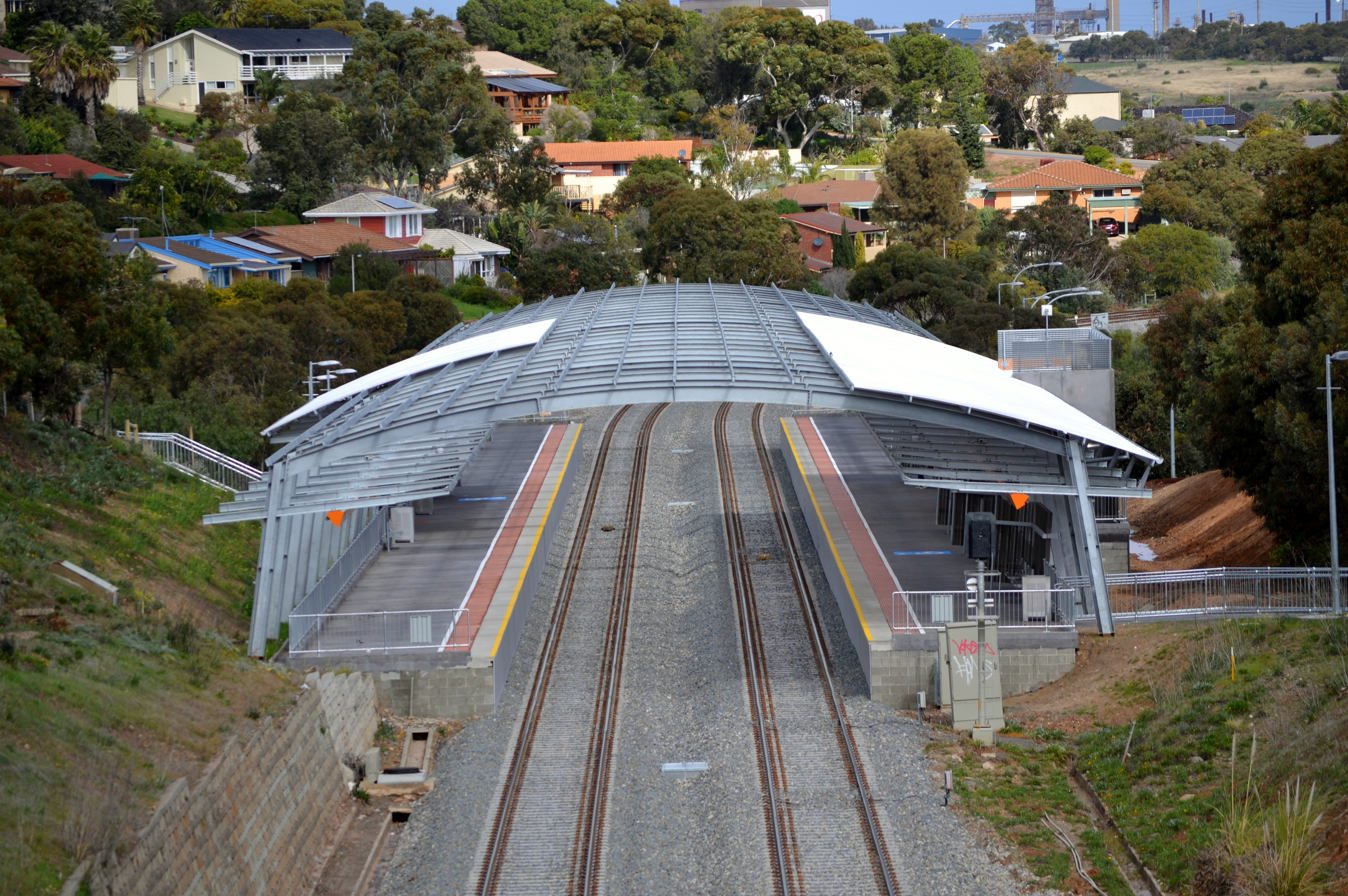
Hallett Cove Beach station, 2011

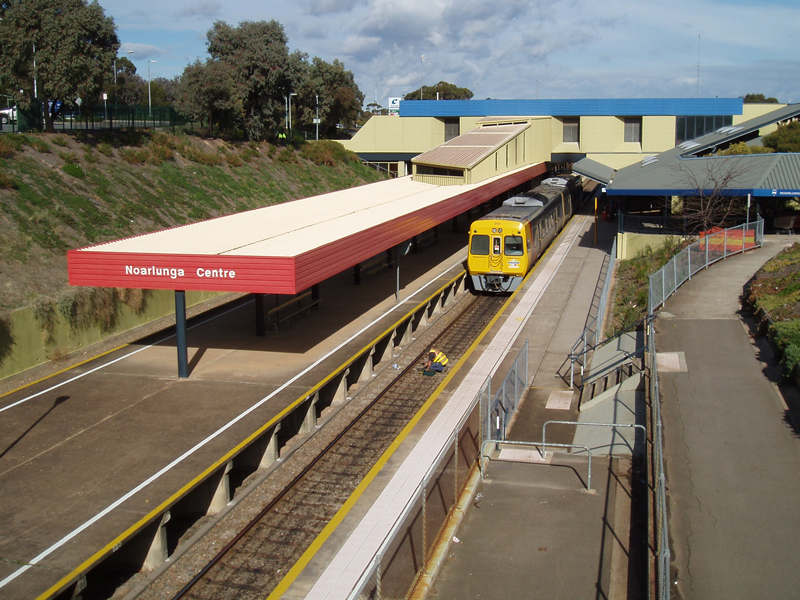
Noarlunga Centre, prior to 2014
