= Hallett Cove Beach railway station =

Railway station in Adelaide, South Australia

Hallett Cove Beach
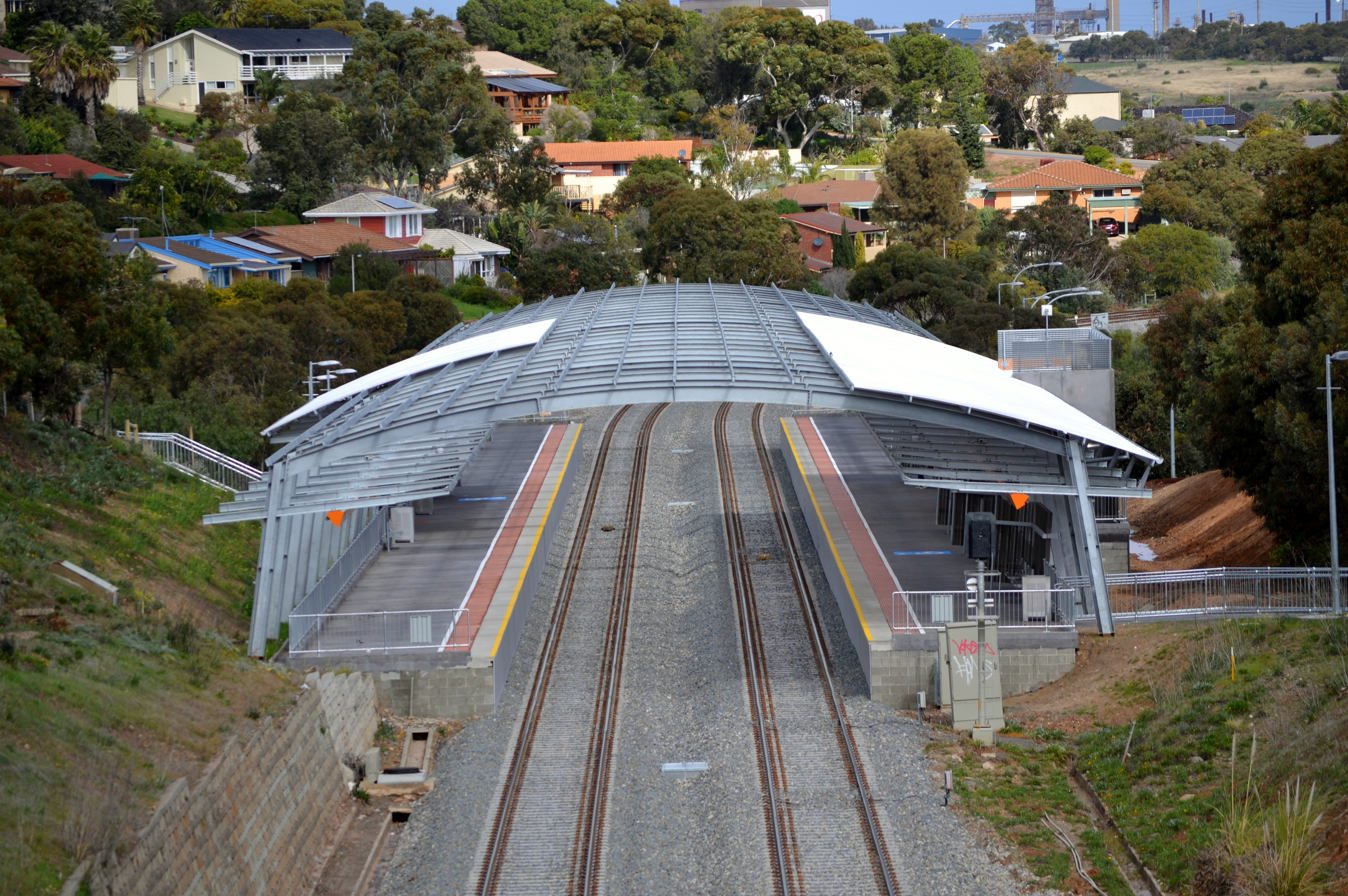
- Southbound view of the station platforms, viewed from The Cove Road overpass, March 2008

General information
- Location: Reliance Road, Hallett Cove
- Coordinates: 35°04′46″S 138°30′07″E
- Owner: Department for Infrastructure & Transport
- Operator: Adelaide Metro
- Line: Seaford
- Distance: 22.9 km from Adelaide
- Platforms: 2
- Tracks: 2
- Bus routes: 681 to Hallett Cove North; 682 to Sheidow Park; 683 to Hallett Cove South

Construction
- Structure type: Ground
- Parking: Yes
- Cycle facilities: Yes

History
- Opened: 30 June 1974
- Rebuilt: 1990s & July 2011

Services
| Preceding station | Adelaide Metro | Following station |
|---|---|---|
| Hallett Cove towards Adelaide | Seaford line | Lonsdale towards Seaford |
Location

Hallett Cove Beach railway station is located on the Seaford line. Situated in the southern Adelaide suburb of Hallett Cove, it is 22.9 kilometres from Adelaide station.

== History ==
Hallett Cove Beach station opened on 30 June 1974 when the line was extended from Hallett Cove. At the time, few services terminated at Hallett Cove Beach with most services terminating at Marino or Hallett Cove. Regular services commenced on 25 January 1976 when services were extended to Christie Downs.

The station closed on 29 August 2010 for an 11-month rebuild which included building a canopy over the station.

== Services by platform ==
| Platform | Destination/s |
|---|---|
| 1 | Seaford |
| 2 | Adelaide |
