= ABB Grain =

Australian agribusiness

ABB Grain Limited
- Type: Public
- Traded as: ASX: ABB
- Industry: Agribusiness
- Founded: 1939
- Defunct: 2009
- Headquarters: Adelaide, Australia
- Key people: Perry Gunner (Chairman); Michael Iwaniw (Managing Director)
- Products: Grain, malt, wool, fertiliser, chemicals, storage and handling services
- Revenue: $2.2 billion (2008)
- Net income: $49 million (2008)
- Number of employees: 1,100 (2008)
- Website: www.abb.com.au

ABB Grain was Australia's largest agribusiness. Founded in 1939, the company was listed on the Australian Securities Exchange until its takeover by Viterra in 2009. For most of its history, the company focused solely on grain accumulation and marketing, but it eventually expanded its focus to other activities, such as grain receival and storage, malting and fertilisers. The company, which traded in all grain commodities, bought grain from all growing regions in Australia.

== History ==
ABB traced its origins to the former Australian Barley Board. Due to the company's expanded operations into different areas, it demutualised to become ABB Grain on 1 July 1999. In 2004, the company merged with the South Australian storage and handling company AusBulk and United Grower Holdings. This brought about the control of the two major grain handlers, along with several of AusBulk's divisions.

After its merger with AusBulk, ABB's supply chain involved operations in storage and handling and logistics, including a significant network of silos and export shipping terminals in South Australia and the eastern states of Australia, and incorporating joint ownership of Australian Bulk Alliance, or ABA, with Japanese trading company Sumitomo.

The company also provided rural services including fertiliser and agrichemical supply and wool and livestock activities. The latter were supported by the acquisitions of the Adelaide Wool Company, Wardle Co and Stawool in 2007.

ABB had significant operations in New Zealand focused on the trading and distribution of grains and proteins. In 2007, the company established a joint venture in Ukraine with French malting company Soufflet to accumulate grain, manage supply chain activities and market grain.

In April 2009, Viterra launched a takeover offer. Combined, the two companies together were responsible for 37 per cent of the world's exports of wheat, canola and barley. Shareholders approved the merger on 9 September. ABB was delisted from the Australian Securities Exchange on 25 September 2009.
