= Lonsdale railway station =

Railway station in Adelaide, South Australia

Coordinates: 35°06′34″S 138°29′30″E

Lonsdale
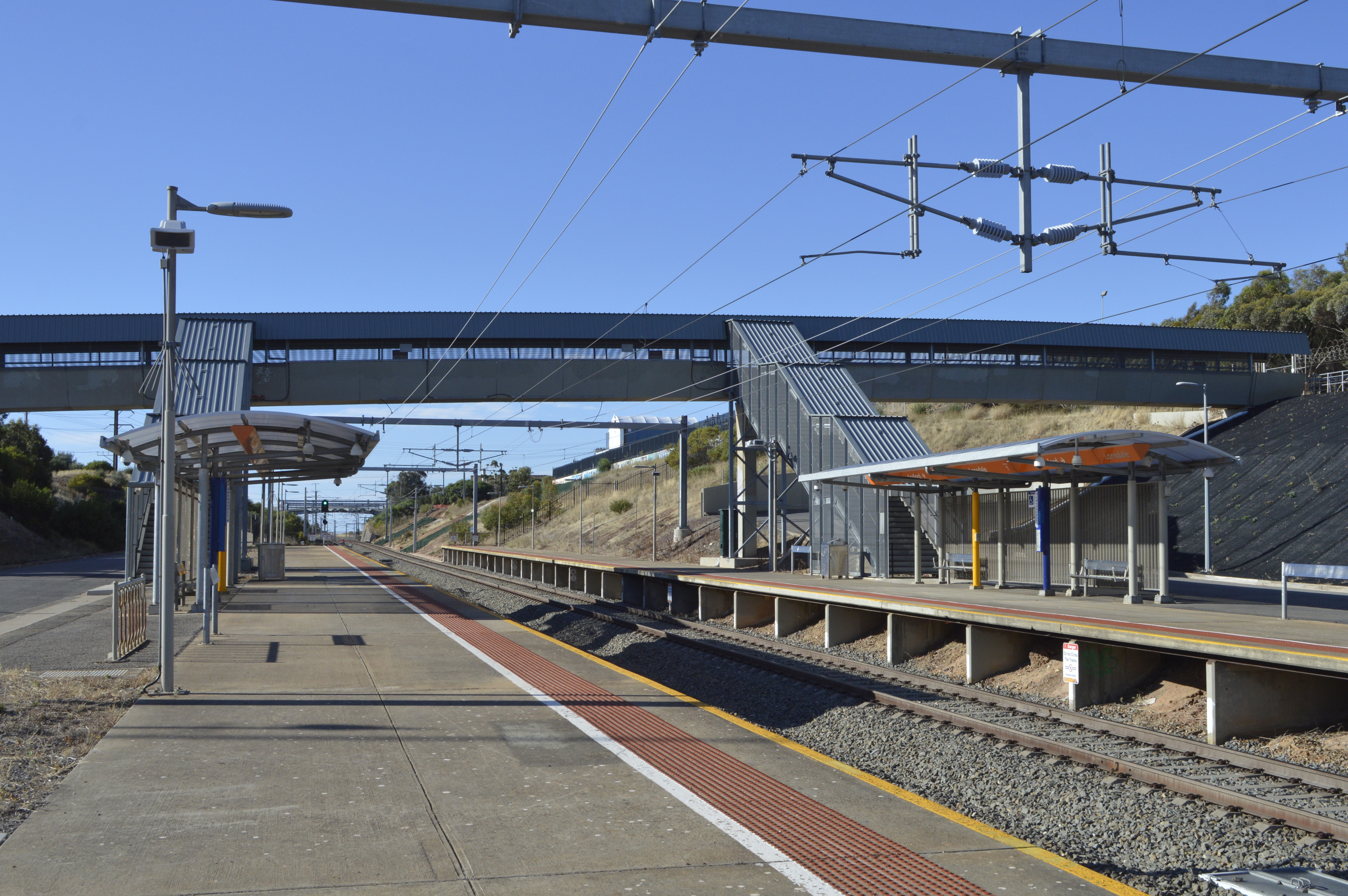
- Northbound view from Platform 1, January 2018. After the 2011 upgrade works and electrification

General information
- Location: Refinery Road, Lonsdale
- Owner: Department for Infrastructure & Transport
- Operator: Adelaide Metro
- Line: Seaford
- Distance: 26.7 km from Adelaide
- Platforms: 2
- Tracks: 2

Construction
- Structure type: Ground
- Parking: Yes

Services
| Preceding station | Adelaide Metro | Following station |
|---|---|---|
| Hallett Cove Beach towards Adelaide | Seaford line | Christie Downs towards Seaford |
Location

Lonsdale railway station is located on the Seaford line. Situated in the southern Adelaide suburb of Lonsdale, it is 26.7 kilometres from Adelaide station.

== History ==
Lonsdale station opened in 1976 as a part of the extension of the line from Marino. The station was staffed in the early days of the station but the building part of the platform has since been demolished, and there is no evidence of the building left. The original 1976 shelters remained until 2011.

=== Collision incident ===
On the evening of August 27, 2018, an unoccupied KIA sedan was pushed onto the tracks by two men who had been vandalizing cars at the station. An express train bound for Seaford collided with the car moments later, destroying the car and causing $100,000 of damage to the train. There were no fatalities or injuries in the collision. Both perpetrators were arrested for the following day. One was handed down a three year, six month jail term. The other was handed down a two year, five month term in October 2019.

== Services by platform ==
| Platform | Destination/s |
|---|---|
| 1 | Seaford |
| 2 | Adelaide |
