= Brighton railway station, Adelaide =

Railway station in Adelaide, South Australia

Brighton
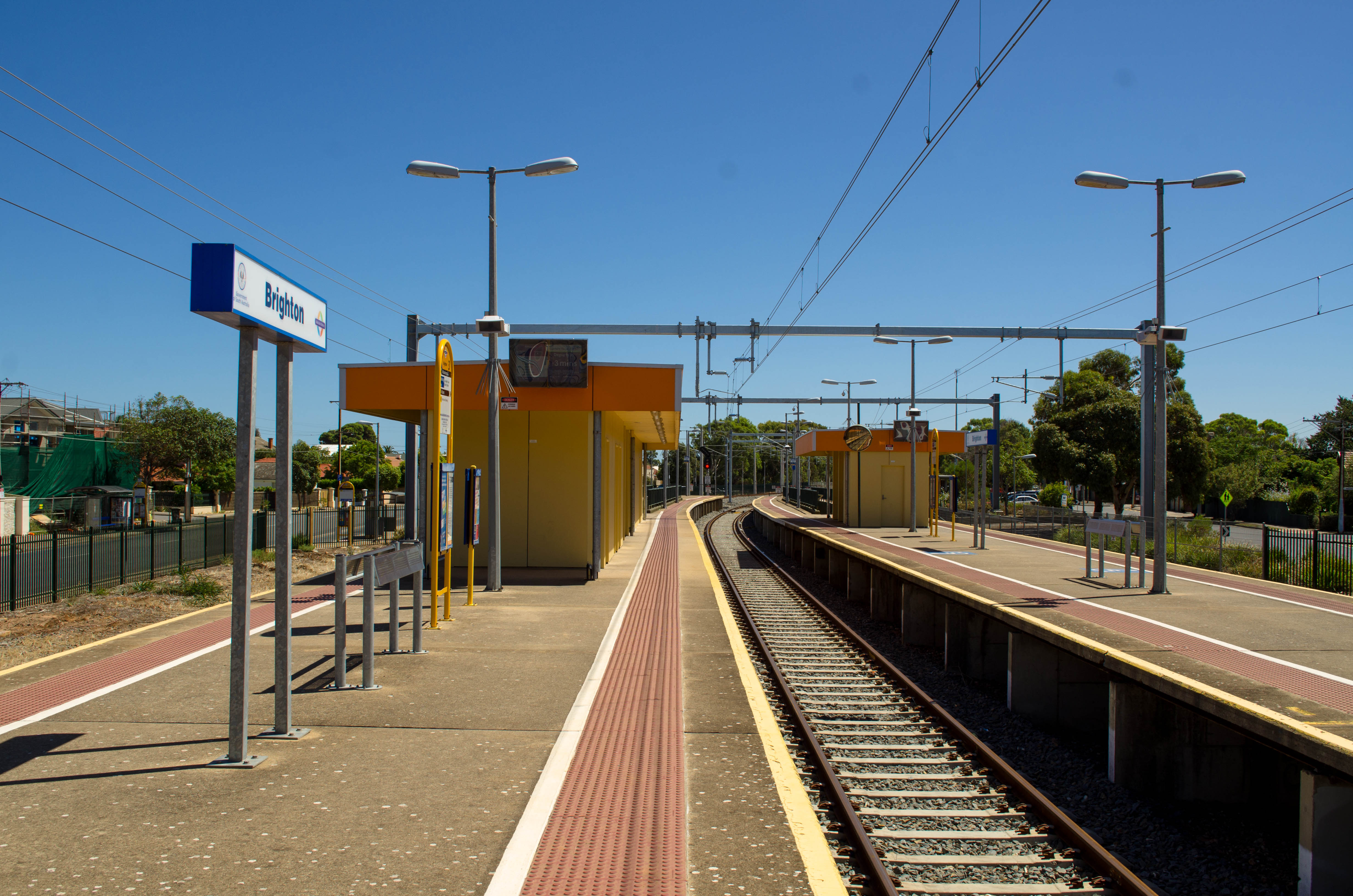
- Northbound view from platform 2 (2014)

General information
- Location: Commercial Road, Brighton
- Coordinates: 35°01′17″S 138°31′09″E
- Owner: Department for Infrastructure & Transport
- Operator: Adelaide Metro
- Line: Seaford
- Distance: 16.0 km from Adelaide
- Platforms: 4
- Tracks: 3
- Bus routes: 265 to City & Westfield Marion

Construction
- Structure type: Ground
- Parking: Yes
- Cycle facilities: Yes

History
- Opened: 1913
- Rebuilt: 25 January 1976

Services
Preceding station	Adelaide Metro	Following station
Hove towards Adelaide	Seaford line	Seacliff towards Seaford
Location

Brighton railway station is located on the Seaford line. Situated in the south-western Adelaide suburb of Brighton, it is 16 kilometres from Adelaide station.

== History ==
The original station was adjacent to Beach Road, 15.8 kilometres from Adelaide station, and opened on 24 November 1913 on the opening of the line from Goodwood.

A rebuilt station was opened on 25 January 1976, coinciding with the Seaford line's extension to Christie Downs.

== Services by platform ==
Platform	Destination/s	Notes
1	Seaford	
2	no booked services	occasional use for terminating services
3	no booked services	occasional use for terminating services
4	Adelaide	
