= Port Stanvac, South Australia =

Decommissioned Australian Oil Port

Coordinates: 35°05′51″S 138°26′48″E

Location of the former Port Stanvac in South Australia

Port Stanvac is a former port and oil refinery in the suburb of Lonsdale south of Adelaide city centre in South Australia. It was operated by ExxonMobil between 1963 and 2003. The site was decommissioned and undeveloped for 20 years following the closure of the refinery. In 2024, the South Australian government announced plans to remediate the area and construct residential housing and park lands with an anticipated completion date of 2028.

== Oil refinery ==
It was announced in 1958 that a refinery with a designed capacity of 3.3 million tons per annum and owned by ExxonMobil would be built at Port Stanvac. The refinery first processed crude oil there in 1963. Its closure in 2003 resulted in the loss more than 400 jobs. Decommissioning and remediation of the 239-hectare (590-acre) site is ongoing and is expected to continue until 2019. Once the site has been decommissioned, the land is expected to be sold in phases. Demolition of the refinery was completed in 2014.

== Port Stanvac jetty ==
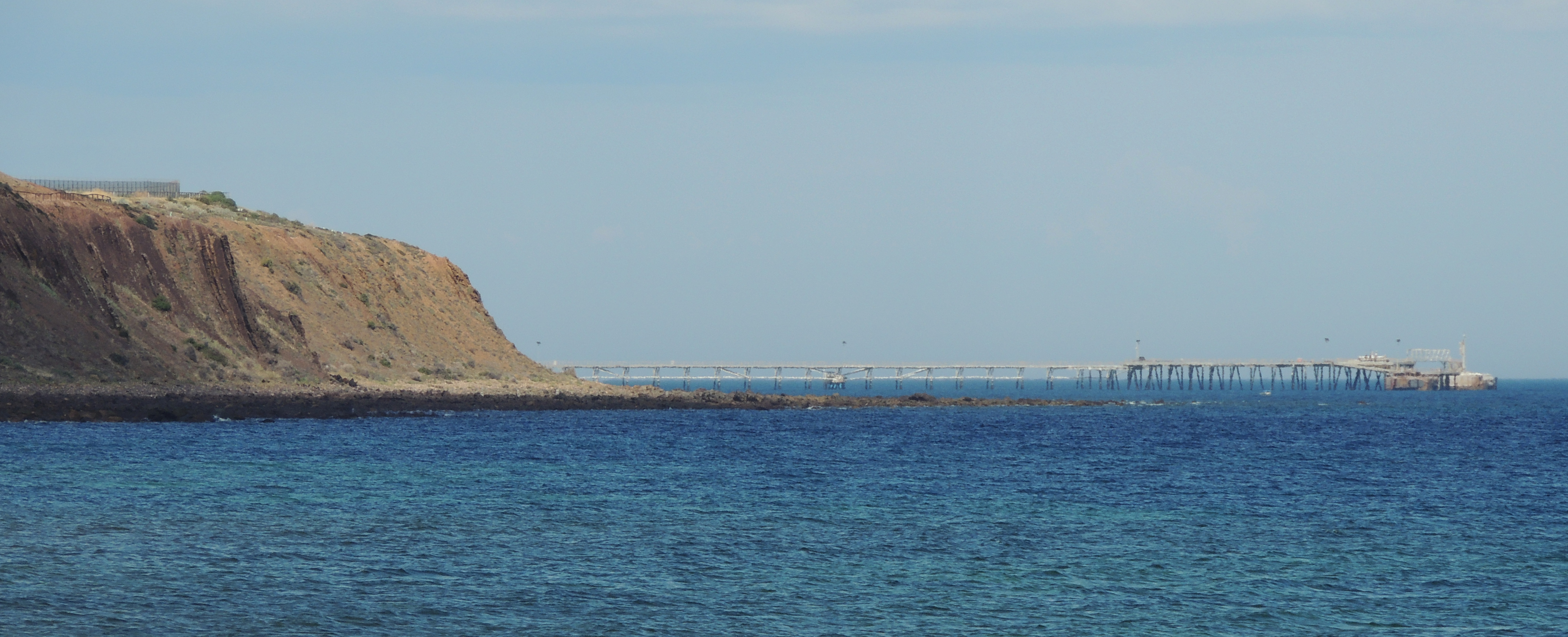
Port Stanvac jetty during decommissioning, March 2016

The Port Stanvac jetty is 670 metres long, and since the refinery's closure in 2003 remains with an exclusion zone for the purposes of public safety. The structure terminates in waters 12 to 15 metres deep.

In October 2015, the South Australian government committed to retaining the existing 215 metre rock groyne adjoining the jetty, but according to ExxonMobil "had not identified a viable alternate use for the defunct structure." Mobil agreed to fund upgrade works estimated to cost $5.7 million to ensure that the groyne would be safe prior to opening it for public access. Has been demolished and proposed maps of future development for the area include a shorter jetty intended primarily for recreational use.

== Oil spills ==
A number of oil spill events occurred at or near Port Stanvac during the refinery's operating life.

- One such incident occurred on 20 July 1978 when oil was discharged from the vessel Aphrodite into Gulf St Vincent.
- On 22 January 1982, oil was spilled from the tanker Esso Gippsland during unloading at the Port Stanvac jetty. The slick was sprayed with chemical dispersant, applied from the air. Oil later washed ashore at Seaford and Aldinga Beach.
- On 28 June 1999, approximately 230 tonnes of oil was discharged from an offshore loading connection to the refinery. The discharge occurred 2 nautical miles offshore. The oil spill response in 1999 involved aerial spraying of 26.1 cubic metres of chemical dispersant and the employment of approximately 150 people in beach cleanups at beaches at Sellicks Beach and Aldinga Beach.

== Grain terminal ==
The construction of a grain export terminal was proposed by the Australian Wheat Board and Australian Barley Board in 2002. The proposal did not progress, due to the progression of the Outer Harbor AusBulk grain terminal in the existing port precinct area. This was due to the additional infrastructure costs, and impacts on the community of additional freight movements in residential areas.

== New Life for Port Stanvac in Mixed Use Development ==
In 2024, the Government of South Australia announced redevelopment of the former ExxonMobil site. The 230 hectare master plan will include approximately 3600 dwellings including a minimum of 15% affordable housing. Approximately 40 hectares of coast land will be protected with public beach access included. Other features will include porting fields, neighborhood scale shopping, entertainment and recreation facilities. The mixed-use development will also include a range of industrial, logistical, warehousing, storage, research, and training land uses, with accessibility to the Lonsdale Railway Station.
