= Hallett Cove railway station =

Railway station in Adelaide, South Australia

Hallett Cove
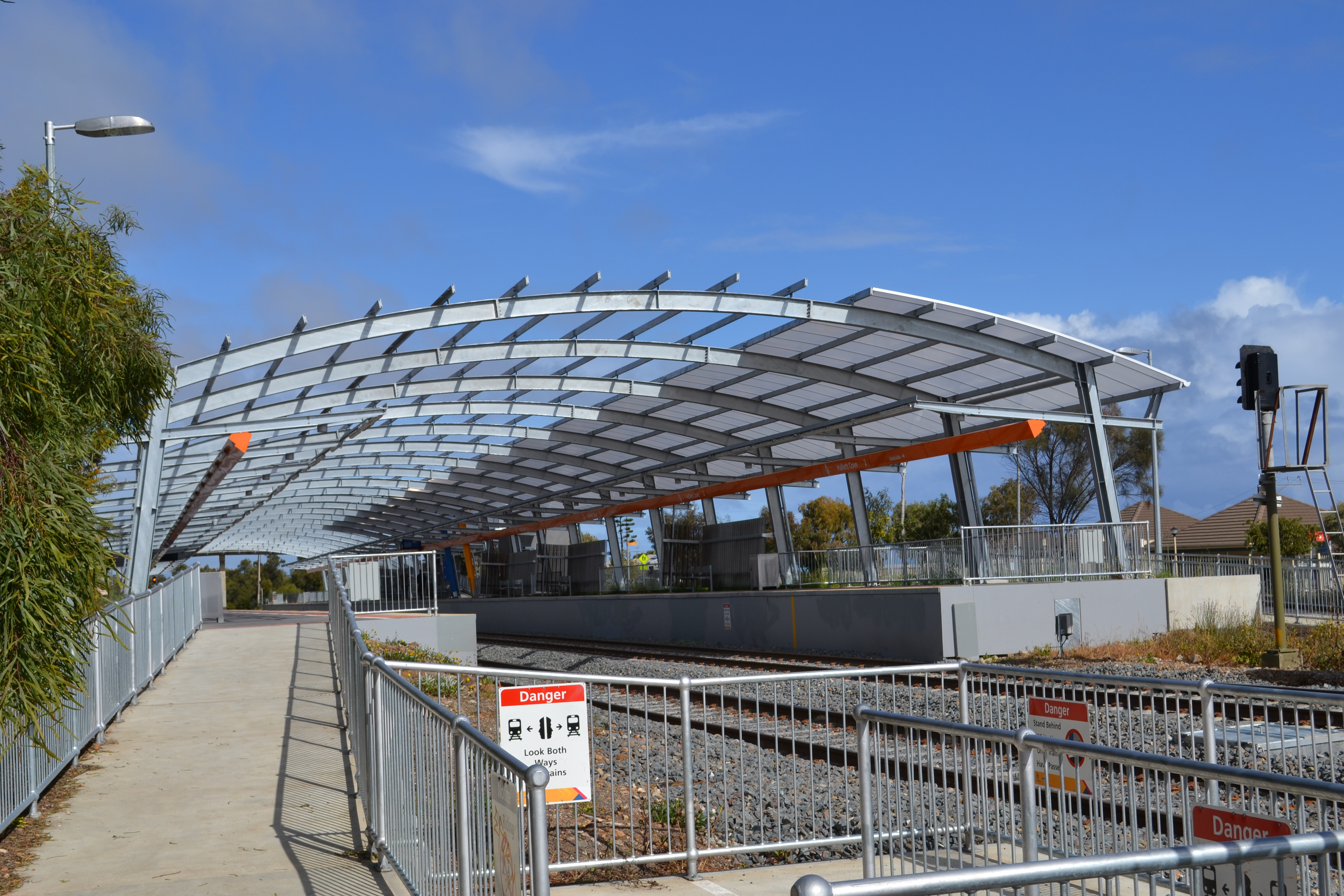
- Southbound view of the station platforms, March 2008

General information
- Location: The Cove Road, Hallett Cove
- Coordinates: 35°03′58″S 138°30′20″E
- Owner: Department for Infrastructure & Transport
- Operator: Adelaide Metro
- Line: Seaford
- Distance: 21.4 km from Adelaide
- Platforms: 2
- Tracks: 2

Construction
- Structure type: Ground
- Parking: Yes
- Cycle facilities: Yes

History
- Opened: 1915
- Rebuilt: 1970s, 1990s and August 2010

Services
Preceding station	Adelaide Metro	Following station
Marino Rocks towards Adelaide	Seaford line	Hallett Cove Beach towards Seaford
Location

Hallett Cove Railway Station is a railway station located on the Seaford line. Situated in the southern Adelaide suburb of Hallett Cove, it is 21.4 kilometres from Adelaide station.

== History ==
A station opened in 1915 as Hallett's Cove as part of the former Willunga line. In the early years of the line, it had a stone-loading plant, traces of which may still be seen. That station was about a kilometre east of the present Hallett Cove station.

In 1959, a branch was approved to make Hallett Cove a junction with a branch from near the station to the Port Stanvac Refinery, which was opened on 14 May 1963. The Willunga railway line was cut back to Hallett Cove in 1969, and the Port Stanvac branch became the main line of the Christie Downs (later Noarlunga Centre, now Seaford) line in 1974. Once it became the main line, there was a siding on the western side of Lonsdale for the refinery, and a siding on the eastern side for the Chrysler (later Mitsubishi) engine factory which opened in 1967 and closed in 1983. Both of these sidings were closed by the 1990s. More recently, the station was closed on 18 January 2010 for an eight-month rebuild which included building a canopy over the station.

== Services by platform ==
Platform	Destination/s
1	Seaford
2	Adelaide
