= Marino railway station, Adelaide =

Railway station in Adelaide, South Australia

Marino
- South-west view from Platform 1

General information
- Location: Bandon Terrace, Marino
- Coordinates: 35°02′32″S 138°31′02″E
- Line: Seaford
- Distance: 18.3 km from Adelaide
- Platforms: 2
- Tracks: 2
- Bus routes: 640 to Westfield Marion

Construction
- Structure type: Ground
- Parking: Yes
- Cycle facilities: No

History
- Opened: 1913
- Rebuilt: 1970s

Services
Preceding station	Adelaide Metro	Following station
Seacliff towards Adelaide	Seaford line	Marino Rocks towards Seaford
Location

Marino railway station is located on the Seaford line. Situated in the southern Adelaide suburb of Marino, it is 18.3 kilometres from Adelaide station.

In addition to serving the hillside Marino community, the station provides the rest of Adelaide with public transport access to a host of local amenities such as the Marino Community Hall (20M) and the Historic Kingston House (500M). The sporting clubs Seacliff Hockey Club & Seacliff Tennis Club are also within walking distance from the station (800M). Brighton Caravan Park (750M) is a popular beachside Caravan and Campground within 10 minutes walk from the Station.

== History ==
Marino was opened in 1913 as the terminus of the Seaford line, until it was extended further south.

The 1974-built station building was erected during the duplication of the line between Oaklands and Hallett Cove Beach in 1975. The station did have a ticket office but it had closed by the 1990s, and was replaced by a bus-type shelter in 2011. Plans for an upgrade were announced in 2024.

== Services by platform ==
Platform	Destination/s
1	Seaford
2	Adelaide
