= Christie Downs railway station =

Railway station in Adelaide, South Australia

Coordinates: 35°07′45″S 138°29′47″E

Christie Downs
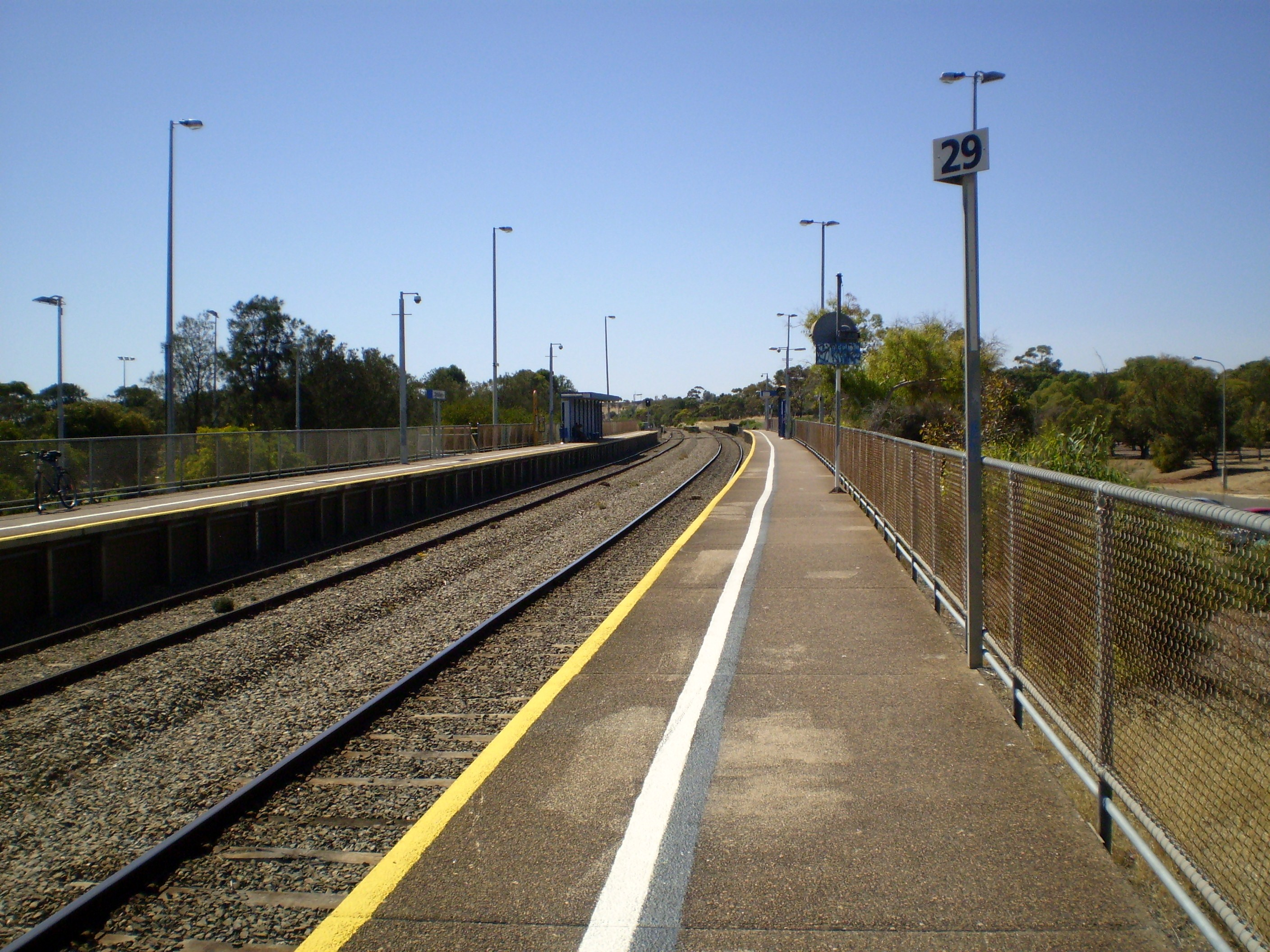
- Northbound view from Platform 2, March 2008

General information
- Location: Justin Crescent, Christie Downs
- Owner: Department for Infrastructure & Transport
- Operator: Adelaide Metro
- Line: Seaford
- Distance: 28.9 km from Adelaide
- Platforms: 2
- Tracks: 2
- Bus routes: 702 Southern Circuit; 715 to Reynella & Noarlunga; 723 & 725 to City & Noarlunga; 733 to Westfield Marion & Noarlunga

Construction
- Structure type: Elevated
- Parking: Yes

History
- Opened: 25 January 1976
- Rebuilt: November 1981, 2017

Services
Preceding station	Adelaide Metro	Following station
Lonsdale towards Adelaide	Seaford line	Noarlunga Centre towards Seaford
Location

Christie Downs railway station is located on the Seaford line. Situated in the southern Adelaide suburb of Christie Downs, it is 28.9 kilometres from Adelaide station.

== History ==
The original Christie Downs station opened on 25 January 1976 when the line was extended from Hallett Cove Beach station. At the same time a new timetable was introduced which had trains stopping at all stations to Brighton, backed up by semi-fast trains that continued to Christie Downs. It was approximately 29.7 kilometres from Adelaide station and consisted of a platform adjacent to what is now the Adelaide bound track. In April 1978, the line was extended to Noarlunga Centre.

The current Christie Downs station opened in November 1981, with the original Christie Downs station closed and later demolished (although the footpath leading to it can still be seen). A $500,000 upgrade proposal, including levelling the ramp, installing new lighting and a bike cage, and painting artworks to deter graffiti, was completed in 2017.

== Services by platform ==
Platform	Destination/s
1	Seaford
2	Adelaide
