= List of railway stations in Adelaide =

This is a list of the 89 currently operating suburban railway stations in Adelaide, South Australia, in addition to active proposals. The network comprises six lines, all originating from the terminus at Adelaide railway station.

== List of current stations ==
Station	Served by	Distance from Adelaide	Date opened	Previous name(s)	Transport connections	Platform Patronage p.a. (2025 estimate)
Adelaide	Belair; Flinders; Gawler; Grange; Outer Harbor; Port Dock; Seaford	0.00 km (0 mi)	19 April 1856		Major Interchange; Bus; Tram	
Adelaide Showground	Belair; Flinders; Seaford	4.00 km (2.49 mi)	17 February 2014			185,000
Albert Park	Grange	9.10 km (5.65 mi)	1882		Bus	82,000
Alberton	Outer Harbor; Port Dock	10.20 km (6.34 mi)	1856			136,000
Ascot Park	Seaford	10.20 km (6.34 mi)	1914			144,000
Belair	Belair	21.50 km (13.36 mi)	1883			194,000
Blackwood	Belair	18.10 km (11.25 mi)	1883		Bus	134,000
Bowden	Grange; Outer Harbor; Port Dock	2.70 km (1.68 mi)	1856 (original site); 15 January 2018 (present site)		Bus; Tram	73,000
Brighton	Seaford	16.00 km (9.94 mi)	1913 (original site); 25 January 1976 (present site)		Bus	280,000
Broadmeadows	Gawler	28.20 km (17.52 mi)	c. 1950	Elizabeth North (c.1950–1961)		86,000
Cheltenham	Outer Harbor; Port Dock	9.20 km (5.72 mi)	1959			58,000
Chidda	Gawler	18.60 km (11.56 mi)	n.d.			74,000
Christie Downs	Seaford	28.90 km (17.96 mi)	25 January 1976 (original site); November 1981 (present site)		Bus	114,000
Clarence Park	Flinders; Seaford	6.30 km (3.91 mi)	1913		Bus	94,000
Coromandel	Belair	17.20 km (10.69 mi)	1883			154,000
Croydon	Grange; Outer Harbor; Port Dock	4.20 km (2.61 mi)	1888			101,000
Draper	Outer Harbor	17.20 km (10.69 mi)	n.d.		Bus	56,000
Dry Creek	Gawler	10.60 km (6.59 mi)	1856			57,000
Dudley Park	Gawler	4.90 km (3.04 mi)	1915			72,000
East Grange	Grange	12.00 km (7.46 mi)	n.d.			64,000
Eden Hills	Belair	14.20 km (8.82 mi)	1 April 1912			80,000
Edwardstown	Flinders; Seaford	7.90 km (4.91 mi)	n.d.			124,000
Elizabeth	Gawler	25.80 km (16.03 mi)	1960		Major Interchange; Bus	400,000
Elizabeth South	Gawler	24.00 km (14.91 mi)	n.d.			79,000
Emerson	Flinders; Seaford	7.10 km (4.41 mi)	16 July 1928			88,000
Ethelton	Outer Harbor	13.10 km (8.14 mi)	1916			78,000
Evanston	Gawler	38.30 km (23.80 mi)	n.d.			46,000
Flinders	Flinders	13.65 km (8.48 mi)	29 December 2020		Bus	414,000
Gawler	Gawler	39.80 km (24.73 mi)	1857		Bus Regional Coach	586,000
Gawler Central	Gawler	42.20 km (26.22 mi)	May 1911	Willaston (May–Sept 1911); North Gawler (1911–1984)		540,000
Gawler Oval	Gawler	41.40 km (25.72 mi)	n.d.			45,000
Gawler Racecourse (limited services)	Gawler	39.30 km (24.42 mi)	1913			
Glanville	Outer Harbor	13.80 km (8.57 mi)	1878		Bus	145,000
Glenalta	Belair	19.30 km (11.99 mi)	n.d.	Belair Road (n.d.)		56,000
Goodwood	Belair; Flinders; Seaford	5.00 km (3.11 mi)	5 March 1883			126,000
Grange	Grange	13.00 km (8.08 mi)	1882 (original site); 9 March 1986 (present site)		Bus	232,000
Greenfields	Gawler	15.50 km (9.63 mi)	1969	Green Fields (n.d.)		60,000
Hallett Cove	Seaford	21.40 km (13.30 mi)	1915 (original site) c. 1970 (present site)	Hallett's Cove (1911–1969)	Bus	204,000
Hallett Cove Beach	Seaford	22.90 km (14.23 mi)	30 June 1974		Bus	280,000
Hove	Seaford	14.60 km (9.07 mi)	12 January 1914	North Brighton (Jan–Apr 1914); Middle Brighton (1914–1920)		128,000
Islington	Gawler	6.00 km (3.73 mi)	n.d.			137,000
Kilburn	Gawler	7.70 km (4.78 mi)	1915			56,000
Kilkenny	Grange; Outer Harbor; Port Dock	6.00 km (3.73 mi)	1881		Bus	88,000
Kudla	Gawler	34.10 km (21.19 mi)	1959			19,000
Largs	Outer Harbor	15.50 km (9.63 mi)	1907		Bus	74,000
Largs North	Outer Harbor	16.40 km (10.19 mi)	21 August 1916	Swansea (1916–1945)	Bus	28,000
Lonsdale	Seaford	26.70 km (16.59 mi)	1976			60,000
Lynton	Belair	10.70 km (6.65 mi)	c. 1950			62,000
Marino	Seaford	18.30 km (11.37 mi)	1913		Bus	44,000
Marino Rocks	Seaford	18.90 km (11.74 mi)	1915			54,000
Marion	Seaford	11.40 km (7.08 mi)	26 May 1954			132,000
Mawson Interchange	Gawler	14.30 km (8.89 mi)	26 February 2006		Major Interchange; Bus	672,000
Midlunga	Outer Harbor	18.80 km (11.68 mi)	1921		Bus	40,000
Mile End	Belair; Flinders; Seaford	2.00 km (1.24 mi)	1898			120,000
Millswood	Belair	5.90 km (3.67 mi)	c. 1910; 28 April 1995 (closed); 12 October 2014 (re-opened)			38,000
Mitcham	Belair	8.50 km (5.28 mi)	March 1883		Bus	274,000
Mitchell Park	Flinders	11.50 km (7.15 mi)	1 July 1966			106,000
Munno Para	Gawler	32.00 km (19.88 mi)	1978 (original site); March 2012 (present site)		Bus	64,000
Noarlunga Centre	Seaford	30.20 km (18.77 mi)	2 April 1978		Major Interchange; Bus	574,000
North Adelaide	Gawler	2.50 km (1.55 mi)	1857			15,000
North Haven	Outer Harbor	20.50 km (12.74 mi)	13 September 1981			46,000
Nurlutta	Gawler	21.50 km (13.36 mi)	1950			34,000
Oaklands	Seaford	13.00 km (8.08 mi)	1913 (original site); 10 June 2008 (present site)		Bus	515,000
Osborne	Outer Harbor	19.60 km (12.18 mi)	30 November 1908		Bus	98,000
Outer Harbor	Outer Harbor	21.90 km (13.61 mi)	1907 (original site); 1926 (present site)		Bus	180,000
Ovingham	Gawler	3.60 km (2.24 mi)	c. 1880		Bus	71,000
Parafield	Gawler	17.70 km (11.00 mi)	1928			220,000
Parafield Gardens	Gawler	16.60 km (10.31 mi)	1 May 1968			59,000
Peterhead	Outer Harbor	14.60 km (9.07 mi)	1911			90,000
Pinera	Belair	20.20 km (12.55 mi)	c. 1920	Overway Bridge (c.1920–c.1950)	Bus	32,000
Port Adelaide	Outer Harbor	11.70 km (7.27 mi)	1916	Commercial Road (1916–1981)	Bus	150,000
Port Dock	Port Dock	12.00 km (7.46 mi)	April 1856; 13 September 1981 (closed); 25 August 2024 (re-opening)	Port Adelaide (1856–1916)	Major Interchange; Bus	128,000
Salisbury	Gawler	20.20 km (12.55 mi)	June 1857		Major Interchange; Bus	605,000
Seacliff	Seaford	17.00 km (10.56 mi)	1915		Bus	118,000
Seaford	Seaford	35.90 km (22.31 mi)	23 February 2014		Major Interchange; Bus Regional Coach	896,000
Seaford Meadows	Seaford	34.70 km (21.56 mi)	23 February 2014		Bus	360,000
Seaton Park	Grange	10.30 km (6.40 mi)	n.d.		Bus	69,000
Smithfield	Gawler	30.20 km (18.77 mi)	1857		Major Interchange; Bus	408,000
St Clair	Outer Harbor; Port Dock	8.60 km (5.34 mi)	23 February 2014		Bus	145,000
Tambelin	Gawler	37.40 km (23.24 mi)	n.d. (original site); 1986 (present site)			90,000
Taperoo	Outer Harbor	18.20 km (11.31 mi)	n.d.	Silicate Siding (n.d.–1920)		63,000
Torrens Park	Belair	9.30 km (5.78 mi)	n.d.	Blythwood (n.d.–1921)	Bus	68,000
Tonsley	Flinders	12.20 km (7.58 mi)	1 July 1966 (original site); 29 December 2020 (present site)			173,000
Unley Park	Belair	7.00 km (4.35 mi)	c. 1910		Bus	62,000
Warradale	Seaford	13.70 km (8.51 mi)	1956			112,000
West Croydon	Grange; Outer Harbor; Port Dock	5.10 km (3.17 mi)	21 December 1915			103,000
Womma	Gawler	27.30 km (16.96 mi)	c. 1950		Bus	62,000
Woodlands Park	Flinders; Seaford	9.10 km (5.65 mi)	1925		Bus	312,000
Woodville	Grange; Outer Harbor; Port Dock	7.50 km (4.66 mi)	April 1856		Bus	234,000
Woodville Park	Grange; Outer Harbor; Port Dock	6.80 km (4.23 mi)	December 1936			154,000

== See also ==
- List of closed Adelaide railway stations
- List of suburban and commuter rail systems
- Railways in Adelaide
- Rail transport in South Australia
