= Railways in Adelaide =

Rail network in South Australia

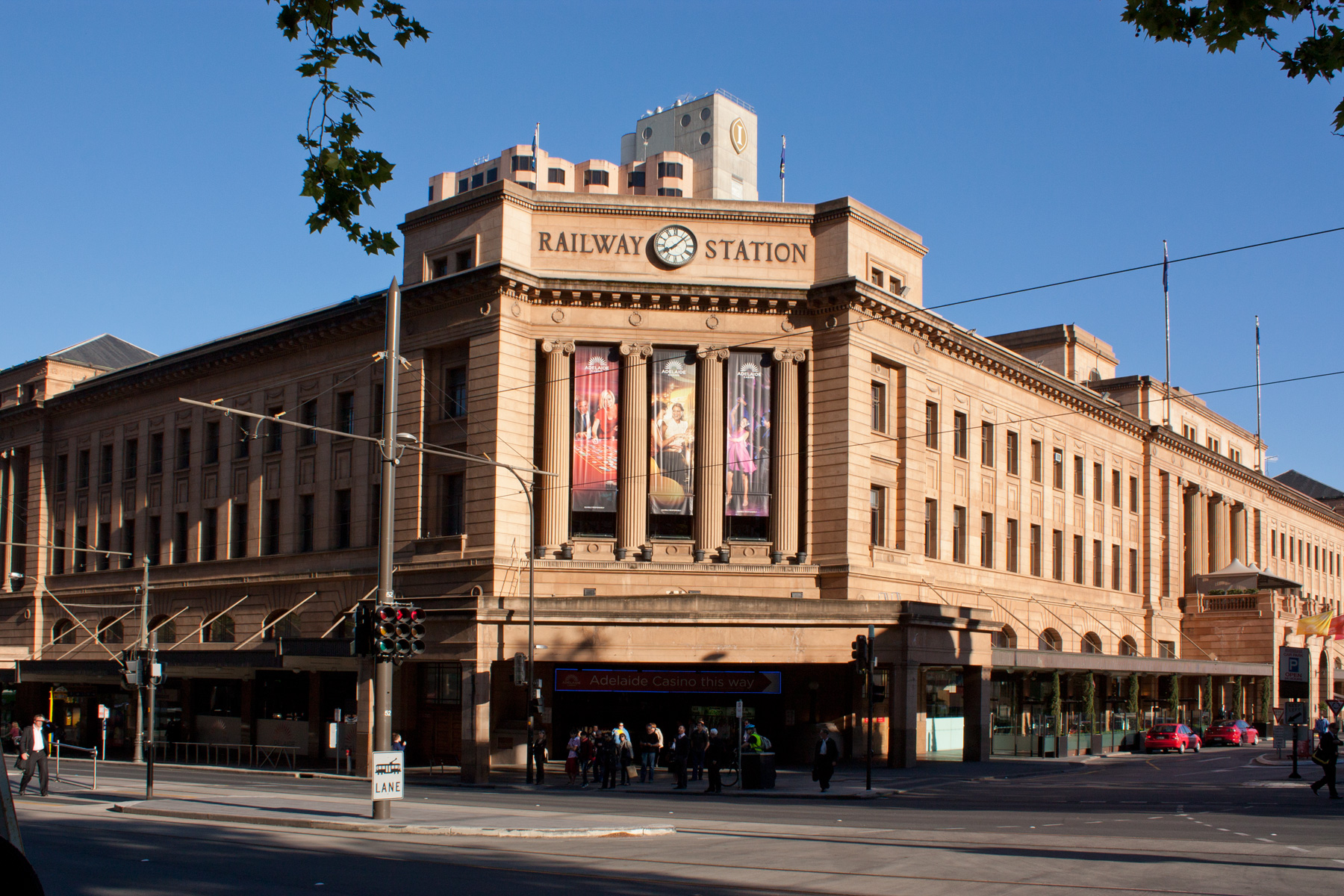
- Adelaide railway station, October 2010

Overview
- Owner: South Australian Railways (1854–1975); State Transport Authority (1975–1994); TransAdelaide (1994–2010); Office of the Rail Commissioner (since 2010)
- Locale: Adelaide, South Australia
- Transit type: Commuter rail
- Number of lines: 7
- Number of stations: 89

Operation
- Began operation: 1856
- Operator: Adelaide Metro
- Character: At-grade with elevated and underground sections
- Rolling stock: 3000 class 4000 class
- Train length: 2, Sometimes 3 (3000/3100); 3 (4000)

Technical
- Track gauge: 1,600 mm (5 ft 3 in) South Australian broad gauge
- Electrification: 25 kV 50 Hz AC overhead (Seaford/Flinders & Gawler only)

The Adelaide rail network is a metropolitan suburban rail system serving the city of Adelaide, South Australia. Operated by Adelaide Metro, it consists of 89 railway stations across 7 lines, which served a patronage of 15.6 million people over the year 2018–19.

The metropolitan network is a suburban rail system designed to transport passengers from Adelaide's suburbs into the Adelaide central business district (CBD) and associated with the main hub at Adelaide station. The Adelaide Parklands Terminal is the main hub for interstate trains services heading north–south and east–west. The first steam train in Adelaide commenced in 1856 between the city and Port Adelaide. Gradually, a network of lines spread out from Adelaide. These were initially built to carry ore, particularly copper, then later freight from the Murray River, and grain from the broadacre lands. In the first half of the 20th century, most of these lines carried passengers as well as freight. By the later half of the 20th century, many of these lines and branches were closed effectively shrinking Adelaide's rail system into a sparse size.

The railway network is primarily at ground level, with some underground and elevated sections. There are 123 at-grade level crossings of the road and rail network in Adelaide. There are no heritage railways that are located in the city of Adelaide area. In addition to the primary commuter network, Adelaide also has a small suburban tram network.

== Operators ==
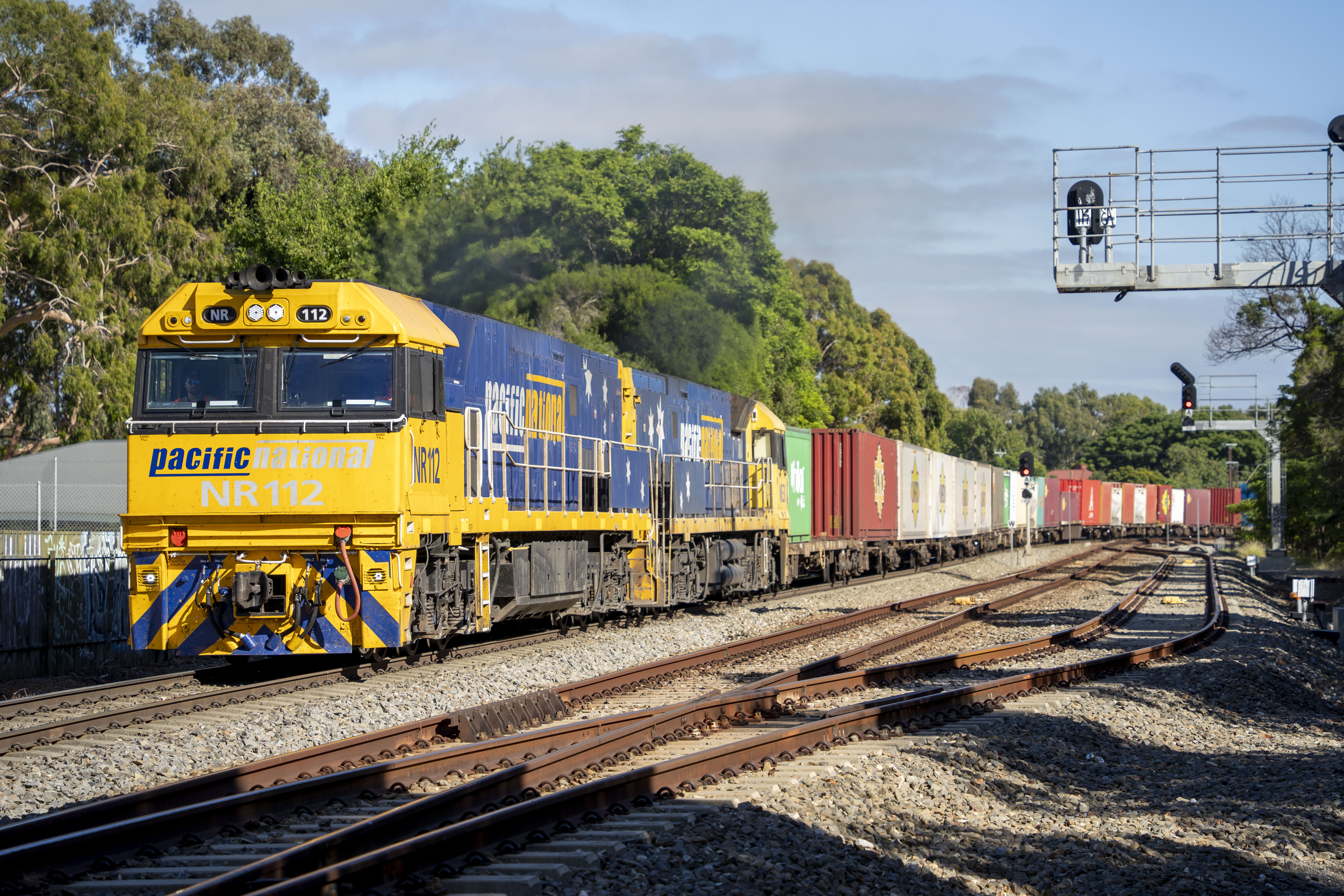
Pacific National Adelaide to Melbourne freight train passing through Millswood parallel to the Belair Line in February 2024

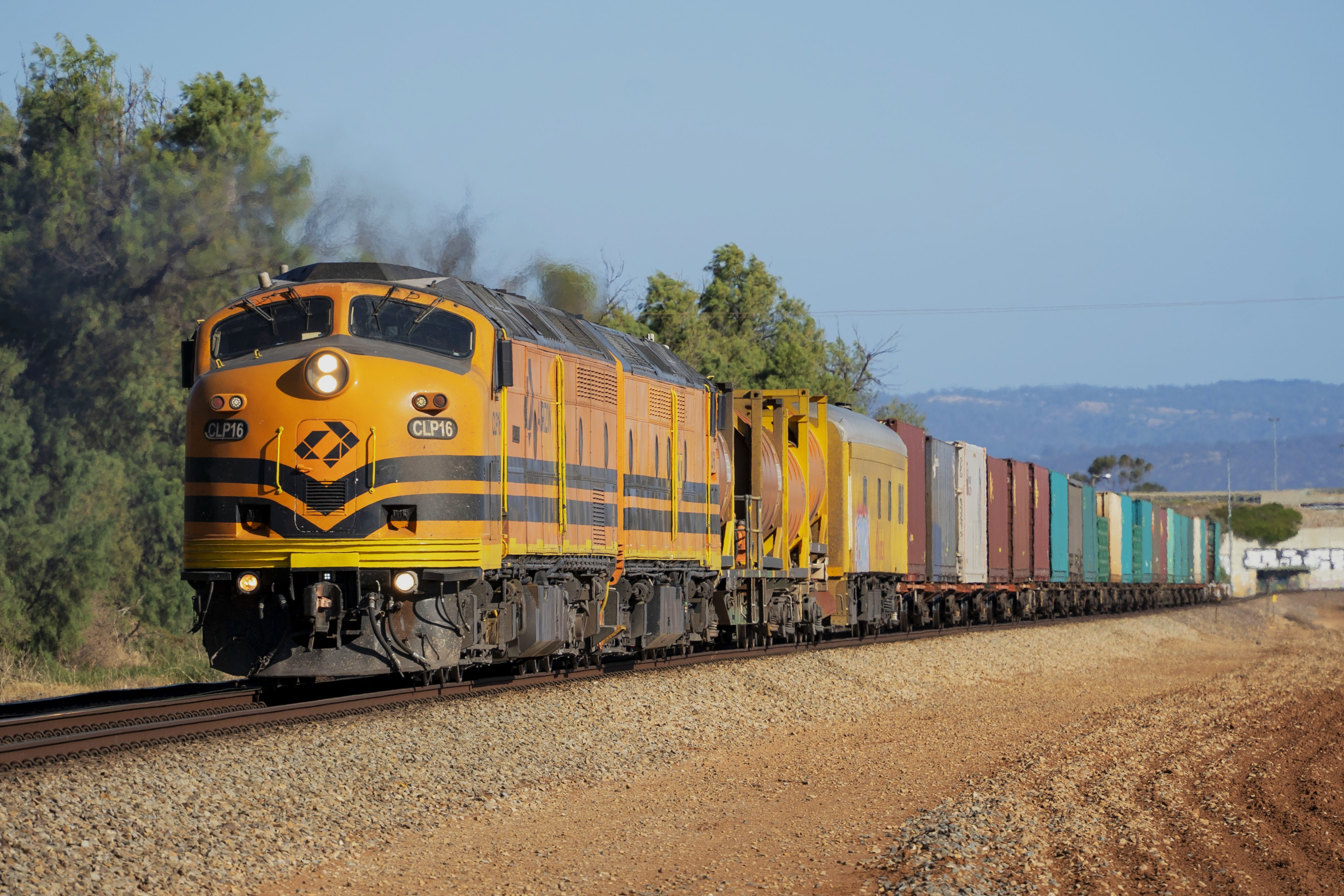
Aurizon freight train from Adelaide to Port Pirie passing Virginia on the ARTC line in December 2024

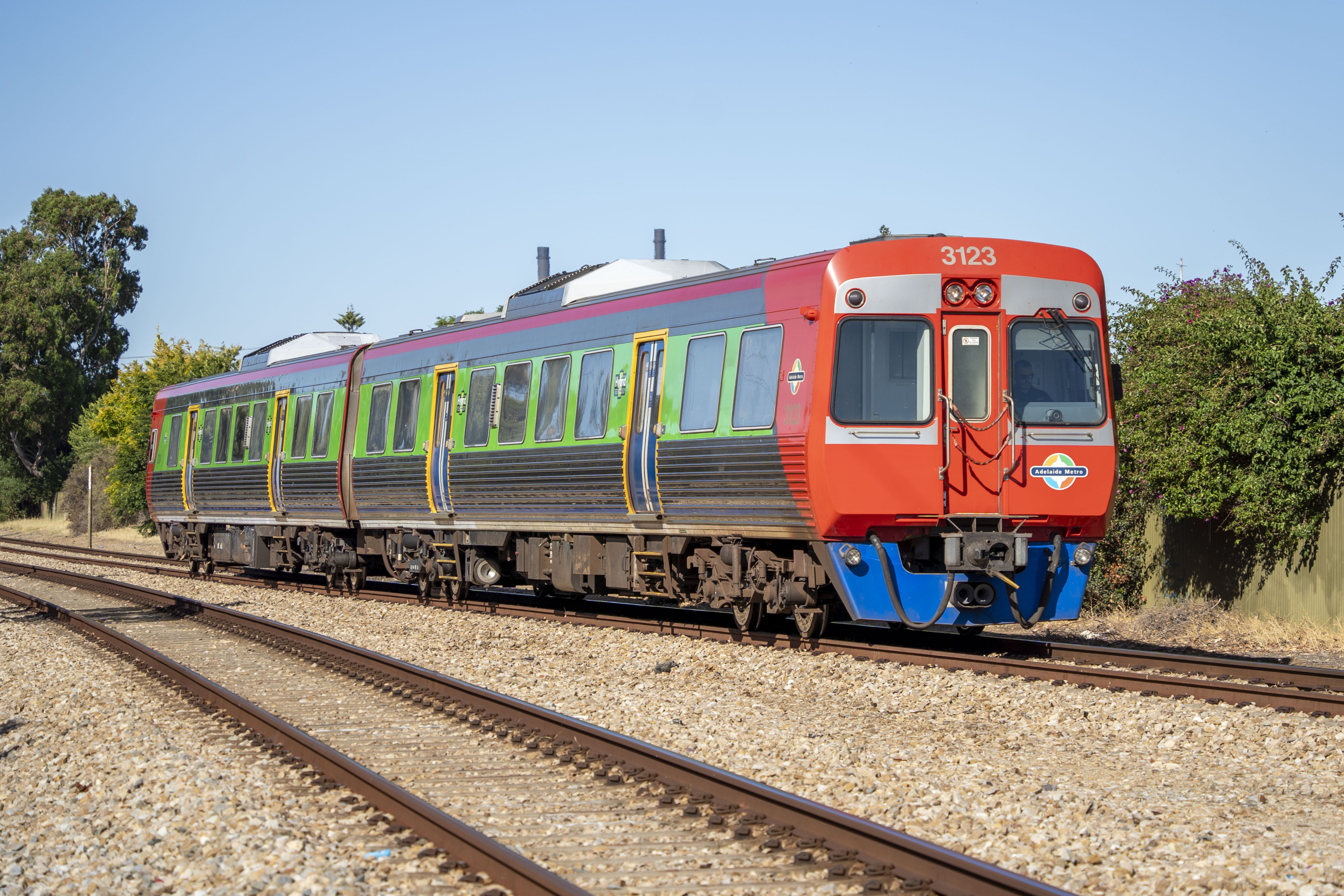
Adelaide Metro 3100 class railcars arriving at Largs North on an Outer Harbor service in December 2024

Rail services around Adelaide are provided by a mixture of private and government-owned organisations.

The Department for Infrastructure & Transport (DIT) owns the suburban passenger rail network, comprising seven lines originating from Adelaide railway station on North Terrace in the CBD. Between 31 January 2021 and 2 February 2025, operation of the network had been contracted to Keolis Downer. Keolis Downer (later Keolis Australia) continues to provide maintenance, customer and security services until 2027.

The Australian Rail Track Corporation (ARTC), an agency of the federal government, owns standard gauge interstate lines heading north and south, together with the dual gauge freight-only branch from Dry Creek to Port Adelaide and Pelican Point. The ARTC lines bypass the city to the west and do not enter the CBD. The ARTC network extends from Adelaide towards Melbourne, Sydney, Perth and Darwin and is used by substantial interstate freight traffic.

Freight trains are operated by a number of private operators, which have access agreements with rail network owners such as the ARTC. The largest of these is Pacific National, which handles the majority of interstate traffic and has the largest locomotive fleet. Other logistics companies also operate freight trains to and from interstate destinations and within South Australia.

Aurizon owns the remaining broad-gauge lines beyond the Adelaide suburban network. They were a handful of lines that were used mainly to move bulk grain and stone from the Barossa Valley and mid-north region of the state to the Port Adelaide area.

Journey Beyond is a private company operating long-distance interstate passenger trains on the ARTC's standard gauge lines, and run from the Adelaide Parklands Terminal, just west of the CBD. Journey Beyond's trains are the Indian Pacific to Sydney and Perth, The Ghan to Alice Springs and Darwin, The Overland to Melbourne and the seasonal Great Southern to Brisbane. Regional intrastate passenger services in South Australia were withdrawn in 1990.

There are presently two heritage railways in South Australia run by volunteers, but none of these are in the Adelaide area. SteamRanger is based at Mount Barker and runs services through to Victor Harbor. The Pichi Richi Railway is considerably more distant from Adelaide, based at Quorn, and runs services through to Port Augusta.

== History ==
=== Early days ===
In 1856, the first steam train ran between Adelaide and Port Adelaide, stopping at Bowden, Woodville and Alberton. Soon after, a 40 km (25 mi) line was built from the Gawler to Adelaide to cater for the agricultural and mining industries.

The South Line, through the Adelaide Hills, opened to Aldgate, then Nairne in 1883, and extended to Bordertown in 1886. The first through train between Adelaide and Melbourne – The Intercolonial Express – ran on 19 January 1887, and was the first intercapital rail journey in Australia without changing trains at a break-of-gauge station.

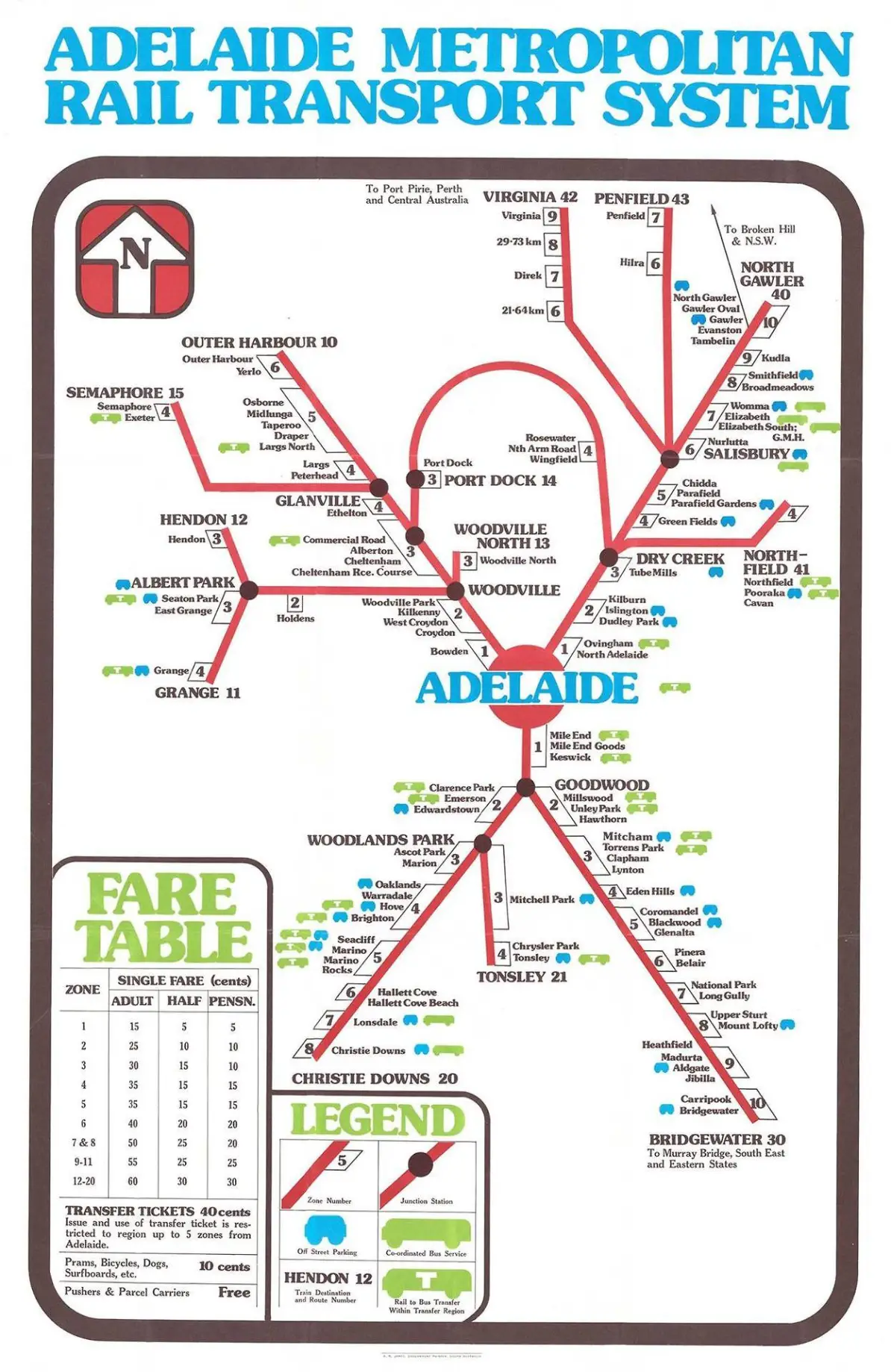
A map of Adelaide's rail lines c.1970s

Most of the lines around Adelaide were built before 1900.

=== Early private companies ===
The Adelaide, Glenelg & Suburban Railway Company opened Adelaide's fifth railway on 2 August 1873, a 5 ft 3 in (1,600 mm) broad gauge, commencing at the Angas Street corner of King William Street and followed that thoroughfare to South Terrace, then ran through the South Parklands and the south-western suburbs on its own right of way to Brighton Road, Glenelg where street running recommenced, using Jetty Road to terminate outside the Pier Hotel on Moseley Square. Steam trains ceased on 2 April 1929 and the line was closed to be rebuilt as a double track standard gauge, electrified at 600 V DC and converted to tramway operation. The Goodwood Overpass was constructed at this time, separating the new tram tracks from the conventional railway. The line was reopened on 14 December 1929 with the city terminus reverting to Victoria Square.

The Holdfast Bay Railway Company built its own railway from Victoria Square, the geographic centre of the City of Adelaide, to the Glenelg seafront at Moseley Square. It was designed to compete with the existing Glenelg railway line.

The Grange Railway and Investment Company opened a railway line from Woodville to Grange in September 1882.

=== The Webb Era ===
Despite the earlier geographic expansion, by 1920 the infrastructure and rolling stock of South Australian Railways (SAR) had become run down, inadequate and outdated. Many of the operating practices, such as train control and signalling, were backward by the standards of the time.

However the 1920s saw substantial and expensive improvements in most facets of the SAR's operations under the leadership of Railways Commissioner William Webb. Webb was an American who had substantial operational experience with US railroads, and served as Commissioner between 1922 and 1930.

During his reign, track, bridges, railway workshops, rolling stock and especially steam locomotives were all modernised and upgraded along essentially American lines. Adelaide station was rebuilt with a handsome sandstone building as a showpiece of the city on North Terrace. The building still stands; the lower level remains as the railway station, but the upper levels have been converted into a casino.

=== The war lines ===
A railway line opened in September 1940 and departed from the main Port Line at Woodville station. It headed in a northerly direction and serviced a wartime munitions works at Cheltenham Park (Actil Station) and a Government Supply Depot at Finsbury station. It was built primarily to service wartime industrial plants. Following the conclusion of the war, the industrial activity in Athol Park was maintained for a period, before declining to an extent that the Finsbury line was regarded as unnecessary, leading to its removal.

A railway opened in 1940 to serve nearby factories at Hendon during World War II. After the war, rail traffic declined and passenger services at Hendon were reduced to morning and afternoon peak-hours only, providing services to residents and workers of factories established in the old munitions factories, including Philips Electrical Industries and the South Australian Brush Company.

A line opened in 1941 to serve various World War II armaments factories at what was then known as Penfield. Because it was built for industrial purposes, sidings branched off both the up and down tracks at many locations. The largest siding went into what is now RAAF Base Edinburgh, the approximate location of the Salisbury Explosives Factory, built between November 1940 and November 1941. During the war years, the line was used by passenger trains carrying workers to the munitions factories in the area, which manufactured components for the Small Arms Ammunition Factories, as well as freight trains carrying raw materials in and armaments out. Passenger trains were necessary because Salisbury was a semi-rural community at the time and most of the workforce had to be brought in from other districts. A more limited peak-hour passenger service to Penfield continued after the war, serving staff at the government Weapons Research Establishment, later to become the Defence Science and Technology Organisation (DSTO).

=== SAR, STA, and AN ===
From early colonial days up until 1978, the SAR had built and operated most of the railway system within the state.

The Commonwealth Railways (CR), owned by the Federal Government, also had a significant role in the northern part of SA, with lines from Port Augusta across the Nullarbor Plain to Kalgoorlie, and to Marree and Alice Springs. None of its lines came close to Adelaide.

During the early 1970s, the Whitlam Federal Government proposed a strategy to nationalise and standardise the various state rail systems around Australia. South Australia and Tasmania were the only states to participate in this initiative and negotiations were long and drawn out. The result was that in March 1978 the SAR became defunct and South Australia's railways were split between Commonwealth and State Government ownership.

A new Commonwealth Government organisation, Australian National Railways Commission (ANR), took over all the former SAR and CR track in South Australia outside the metropolitan area. Other rail facilities such as property and workshops were also transferred to ANR. ANR become Australian National (AN) as it refined its corporate identity.

The State Government retained ownership and control of tracks and trains in the Adelaide suburban area under the auspices of the State Transport Authority (STA). The STA had been created in 1974 to co-ordinate all public transport in South Australia.

In 1994, the STA was abolished and reformed as the government-owned corporate body TransAdelaide as a prelude to competitive tendering for operation of bus and rail services in metropolitan Adelaide. TransAdelaide subsequently lost all its bus services to private operators, but has retained the contracts to operate train and tram services.

In November 1997, AN was broken up and sold as part of a Federal Government privatisation agenda. Track, workshops, depots and passenger and freight operations were sold to various private organisations, which has led to today's operational structure described in an earlier section.

== Electrification and modernisation ==
By the 2000s Adelaide's rail system was in need of major investment and upgrades. In 2008 the South Australian government announced, in collaboration with the Federal government, a plan to upgrade and electrify the Noarlunga line (now Seaford line) and Tonsley line (now Flinders line); the Belair line was also partially electrified as far as Goodwood to allow for electric train movements. Work on electrification began in January 2013 with the Belair line completed in mid-July 2013, and electric train services beginning in February 2014 on the recently extended Seaford Line. The ageing fleet of 2000 class railcars were all retired by 2015.

Previously cancelled in 2013, electrification of the Gawler line was announced in 2018. Though Stage 1 electrification as far as Salisbury was initially planned, a $220 million grant from the Federal Government also allowed for Stage 2 electrification on the remainder of the line to proceed. Works commenced in November 2019, and after many delays electric train services began on 12 June 2022. The Outer Harbor railway line was rebuilt in preparation for its electrification but the project was cancelled in June 2012.

In 2017, $16.4 million was allocated in the state budget for a new station to be built next to Baker Street, near the original site. It was to be at the end of a new 1.0 km (1100 yard) spur line off the existing Outer Harbor rail line, using the existing corridor beside the National Railway Museum that connects to the Outer Harbor line. However, in June 2019 when some museum track had already been dismantled, the development was "put on hold" while a North West Planning Study was conducted; a forecast cost increase to $40 million was cited. (Note: For a double mainline connection and signalling, a 300-metre loop, about 700 metres of new line, a level crossing and basic station.) On-ground preparatory work was reversed in January 2020, with sleepers bought for the project being reallocated to other lines. In 2022, the state government committed $51 million for the construction of the new Port Dock Railway Line with a new station and bus interchange at Baker Street, adjacent to the National Railway Museum. A short platform face was also constructed for Railway Museum heritage services running along a parallel stretch of track. Site preparation works began for the new railway line in June 2023; the tracks were completed in April 2024, and a 3000 class railcar (3123-3124) made a test run on 2 June. The station and interchange officially open on 25 August 2024.

== Future projects ==
=== Seaford line extension to Aldinga Beach ===
In 2019, Renewal SA delivered a Draft Structure Plan of a 94 hectare area of land in Aldinga which is set to include a new school and a railway station as an extension of the Seaford line.

=== Underground city centre link ===
In 2019, Infrastructure SA intended to complete electrification of the Gawler line, and analyse the feasibility of an underground rail link in the CBD between the northern and southern railway lines.

=== Belair line extension to Mount Barker ===
The SA government has allocated $10 million to explore extending Adelaide's rail line further north and south of the city including an extension of services from Belair to Mount Barker. The cost has been estimated to reach $5 billion but has the acknowledgement that the city of Mount Barker will need better transport.

== Lines ==
Line	First service	Image	Length	Stations	Electrification	Rolling stock	Map
Belair line	1883		21.5 km (13.36 mi)	15	between Adelaide and Goodwood, no electric services	3000 class	
Gawler line	1857		42.2 km (26.22 mi)	27	Yes	4000 class	
Grange line	1882		Branch: 5.5 km (3.42 mi). Including service to Adelaide: 13.0 km (8.08 mi)	Branch: 4. Including service to Adelaide: 11.	—	3000 class	
Outer Harbor line	1856		21.9 km (13.61 mi)	22	—	3000 class	
Port Dock line	2024		Branch: 1.0 km (0.62 mi). Including service to Adelaide: 12.0 km (7.46 mi).	Branch: 1. Including service to Adelaide: 11.	—	3000 class	
Seaford line	1913		35.9 km (22.31 mi)	24	Yes	4000 class	
Flinders line	1966		Branch: 4.5 km (2.80 mi); Total: 13.0 km (8.08 mi)	Branch: 3 Total: 11	Yes	4000 class	

=== Closed lines ===
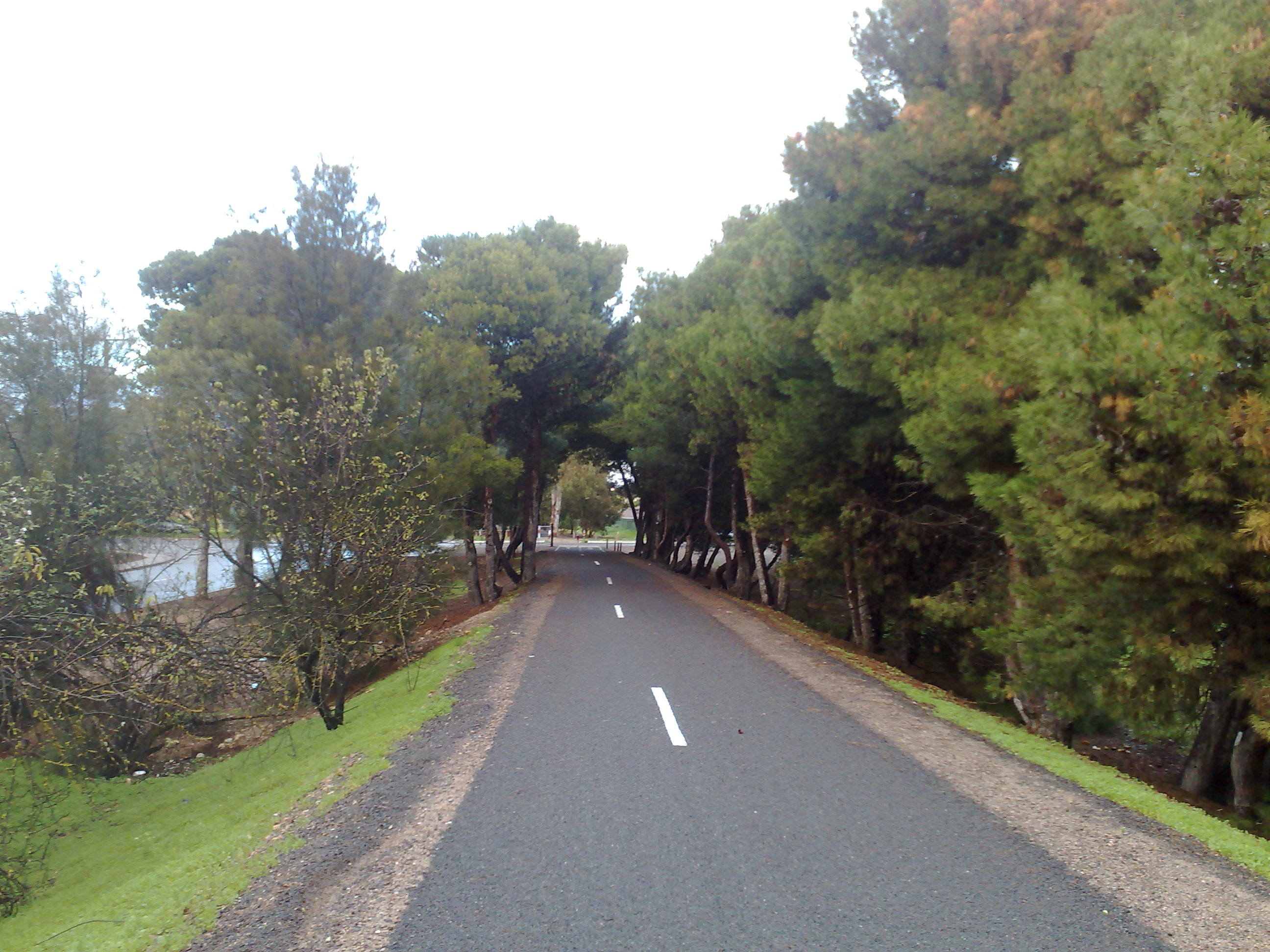
The Coast to Vines Rail Trail, built on the route of the former Willunga line.

Adelaide's passenger rail network decreased in size during the later half of the 20th century, with the closure of several lines and branches, including:

- Dry Creek–Port Adelaide line: opened 1868 (last passenger service in 1988; now freight only)
- Finsbury line: Woodville to Gillman Junction, 1940–1978
- Northfield line: Dry Creek to Northfield, 1857–1987
- Penfield line: Salisbury to Penfield 3, 1941–1991
- Semaphore line: Port Adelaide to Semaphore, 1878–1978
- Willunga line: Hallett Cove to Willunga, 1915–1969 (now the Coast to Vines Rail Trail)
- Henley Beach railway line: Grange to Henley Beach, 1894–1957
- Bridgewater railway line: Belair to Bridgewater, 1883–1987
- Hendon railway line: Albert Park to Hendon, 1940–1980

Many of these were industrial branch lines which were intended mainly for freight, but were also provided with passenger trains at peak hours.

== Rolling stock ==
Class	Image	Type	Top speed (km/h)	Builders	Built	Number	Lines Served	Notes
3000		DMU	130	Comeng; Clyde Engineering	1988–1996	30	Belair; Grange; Outer Harbor; Port Dock	Interiors refurbished 2011 and 2021–22. Mechanically refurbished 2018–19.
3100	3124 and 3123 at Midlunga.	DMU	130	Comeng; Clyde Engineering	1988–1996	40 2-car sets	Belair; Grange; Outer Harbor; Port Dock	Interiors refurbished 2011 and 2021–22. Mechanically refurbished 2018–19.
4000 (A-City)		EMU	110	Bombardier; Alstom (Note: Bombardier Transportation was acquired by Alstom on 29 January 2021, during construction of the second batch of A-City trains. All of this batch were delivered by Alstom.)	2013–2015, 2019–2023	34 3-car sets	Gawler; Seaford; Flinders	

== See also ==
- List of Adelaide railway stations
- List of closed Adelaide railway stations
- List of public transport routes in Adelaide
- Trams in Adelaide
- Transport in Adelaide
