= Woodville railway station =

Woodville railway station could refer to one of several similarly named railway stations:

- Woodville railway station, Adelaide
- Woodville railway station, Manawatu-Wanganui, New Zealand
- Woodville railway station (England), a closed British railway station

== See also ==
- Woodville Park railway station, Adelaide
