= Hendon railway line =

Former railway line in Adelaide, South Australia

Hendon

Overview
- Status: Closed and removed
- Locale: Adelaide, South Australia
- Coordinates: 34.8797°S 138.5146°E
- Termini: Albert Park; Hendon

History
- Opened: 1940
- Closed: 1980

Technical
- Line length: 1.1 km (0.68 mi)
- Number of tracks: 1

The Hendon railway line was a railway in western Adelaide that was used mainly for industrial purposes in the mid 20th century. The line branched from Albert Park station on the Grange line, and ran for 1.1 kilometres to Hendon station. There is no evidence of the track left. The eastern end of West Lakes Boulevard now covers most of the path of the track.

== History ==
The line opened in 1940 to serve nearby factories at Hendon during World War II. After the war, rail traffic declined and passenger services at Hendon were reduced to morning and afternoon peak-hours only, providing services to residents and workers of factories established in the old munitions factories, including Philips Electrical Industries and the South Australian Brush Company. Hendon station and the line closed on 1 February 1980 and the track has since been removed.

Trains to and from Hendon invariably ran through to Woodville or Adelaide, and after the end of World War II, the Hendon trains only operated at industrial shift-change times. In spite of low passenger numbers the service continued operation until 1 February 1980, after which the line was closed and removed. There is no evidence of the station or track left, and the trackbed of the Hendon branch now forms part of the eastern end of West Lakes Boulevard, a main approach road to the suburb of West Lakes and the Westfield West Lakes shopping mall.
