= Seaton Park railway station =

Railway station in Adelaide, South Australia

Coordinates: 34.8904°S 138.515°E

Seaton Park
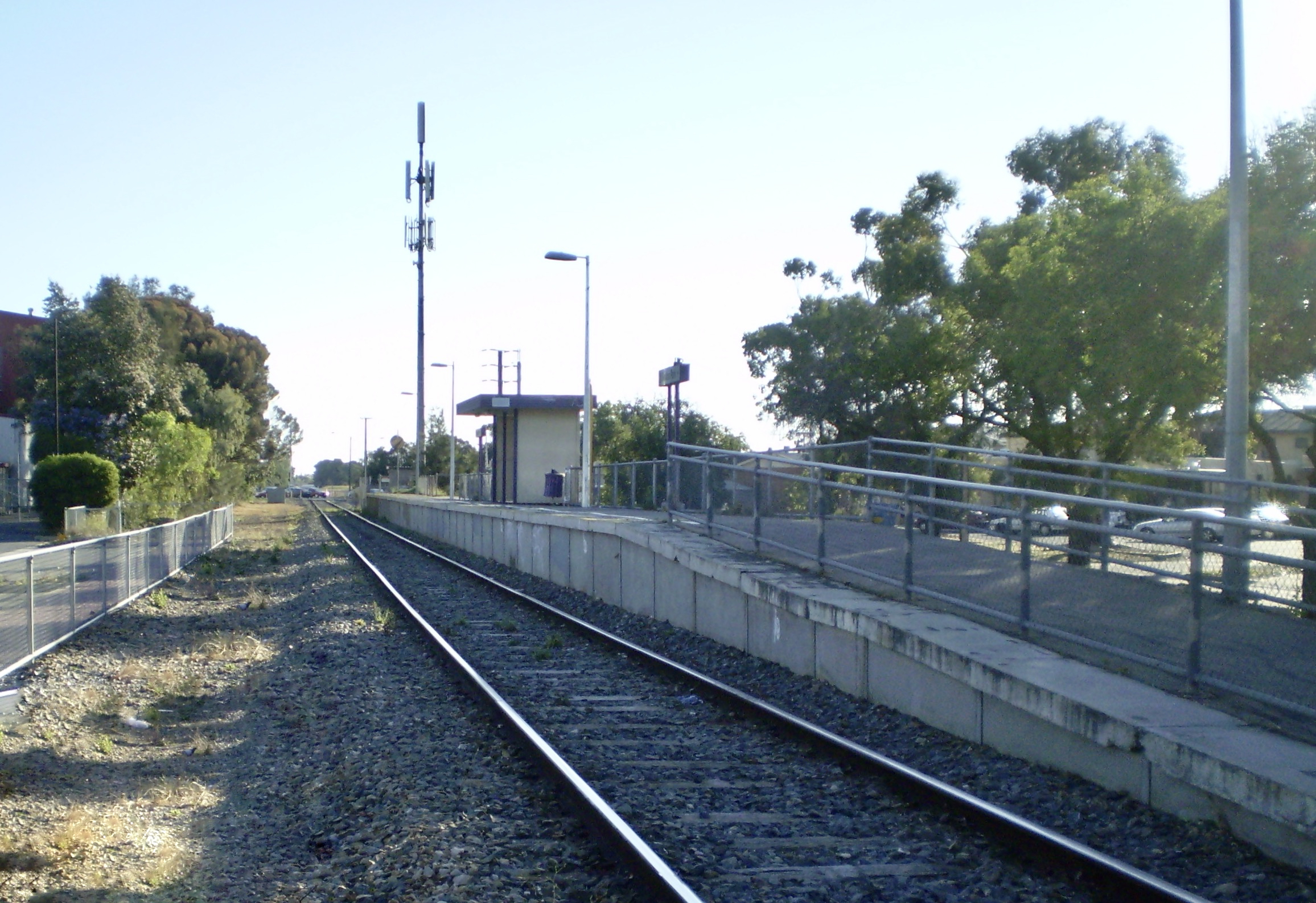

General information
- Location: Clark Terrace, Seaton
- Owner: Department for Infrastructure & Transport
- Operator: Adelaide Metro
- Line: Grange
- Distance: 2.9 km (1.8 mi) from Woodville station (start of Grange branch line), 10.3 km (6.4 mi) from Adelaide
- Platforms: 1
- Tracks: 1
- Bus routes: 371 and 372
- Connections: Bus

Construction
- Structure type: Ground, side platform
- Parking: Yes
- Cycle facilities: No
- Accessible: Yes

Other information
- Fare zone: 18457 (to Grange); 16560 (to City)
- Website: Adelaide Metro

Services
Preceding station	Adelaide Metro	Following station
Albert Park towards Adelaide	Grange line	East Grange towards Grange
Location

Seaton Park railway station is located on the Grange railway line in the western Adelaide suburb of Seaton. It is 2.9 kilometres (1.8 miles) from the junction at the eastern end of the Grange line, Woodville, which in turn is 7.5 kilometres (4.7 miles) from Adelaide station. It is mainly used by local commuters travelling to and from the city centre.

== History ==
The station lies between Albert Park and East Grange stations. The origin of the name is obscure, but Seaton is a very common place name in England. The Grange line was opened in 1882 from Woodville to Grange. It was extended to Henley Beach from 1894 to 1957, when it was retracted again to Grange, its present terminus.

The station has been re-named and relocated short distances on several occasions. Originally it was a stopping place named Cross Roads, just west of Simpson Street (now Tapleys Hill Road). In 1911 it was re-named Grangeville and moved a very short distance to south of Trimmer Parade. In 1918 it was again re-named Seaton Park. In 1923 a new station was opened on the eastern side of Tapleys Hill Road, north of Trimmer Parade; its platform was lengthened during 1943.

In the History of Woodville, it was recorded that gravel deposits of an ancient river were quarried at Findon from about 1917 to the 1930s. The gravel pits lay west of Findon Road, between Grange Road and Angley Avenue. Sixteen single-horse scoops dumped the gravel on a grid taken by elevator to load the rail trucks. A steam locomotive, which took one load per day, ran on a branch line which joined the Grange railway line at Seaton Park.

== Services by platform ==
Platform	Lines	Destinations
1	Grange	All stops services to Grange & Adelaide
