= East Grange railway station =

Railway station in Adelaide, South Australia

East Grange
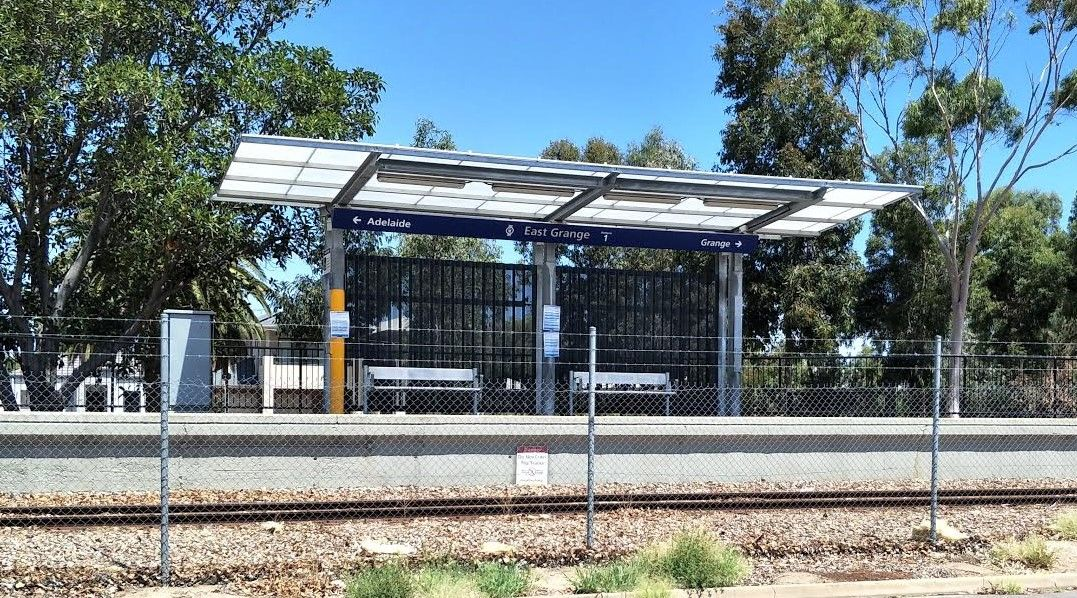
- The single platform at East Grange in 2020

General information
- Location: Nash Street, Grange
- Coordinates: 34°53′57″S 138°30′06″E
- Owner: Department for Infrastructure & Transport
- Operator: Adelaide Metro
- Line: Grange
- Distance: 12 km from Adelaide
- Platforms: 1
- Tracks: 1
- Connections: None

Construction
- Structure type: Ground, side platform
- Parking: Yes
- Cycle facilities: No
- Accessible: Yes

Other information
- Station code: 16509 (to City); 18459 (to Grange)
- Website: Adelaide Metro

Services
Preceding station	Adelaide Metro	Following station
Seaton Park towards Adelaide	Grange line	Grange Terminus
Location

East Grange railway station is located on the Grange line. Situated in the western Adelaide suburb of Grange, it is 12 kilometres from Adelaide station.

== History ==
It is unclear when this station was opened.

The railway line between Woodville and Grange opened in September 1882 as a private railway, constructed by the Grange Railway and Investment Company. East Grange is a single platform station on a single track branch line.

A new shelter was constructed at the station in 2017 along with new seating and fencing.

On March 1, 2023, a 74-year-old woman was struck by a train at the station, and later died in hospital, renewing calls for upgrades to vehicle and pedestrian crossings on the Outer Harbor and Grange lines.

== Services by platform ==
Platform	Lines	Destinations	Notes
1	Grange	All stops services to Grange & Adelaide	
