= Kilkenny railway station, Adelaide =

Railway station in Adelaide, South Australia

Kilkenny
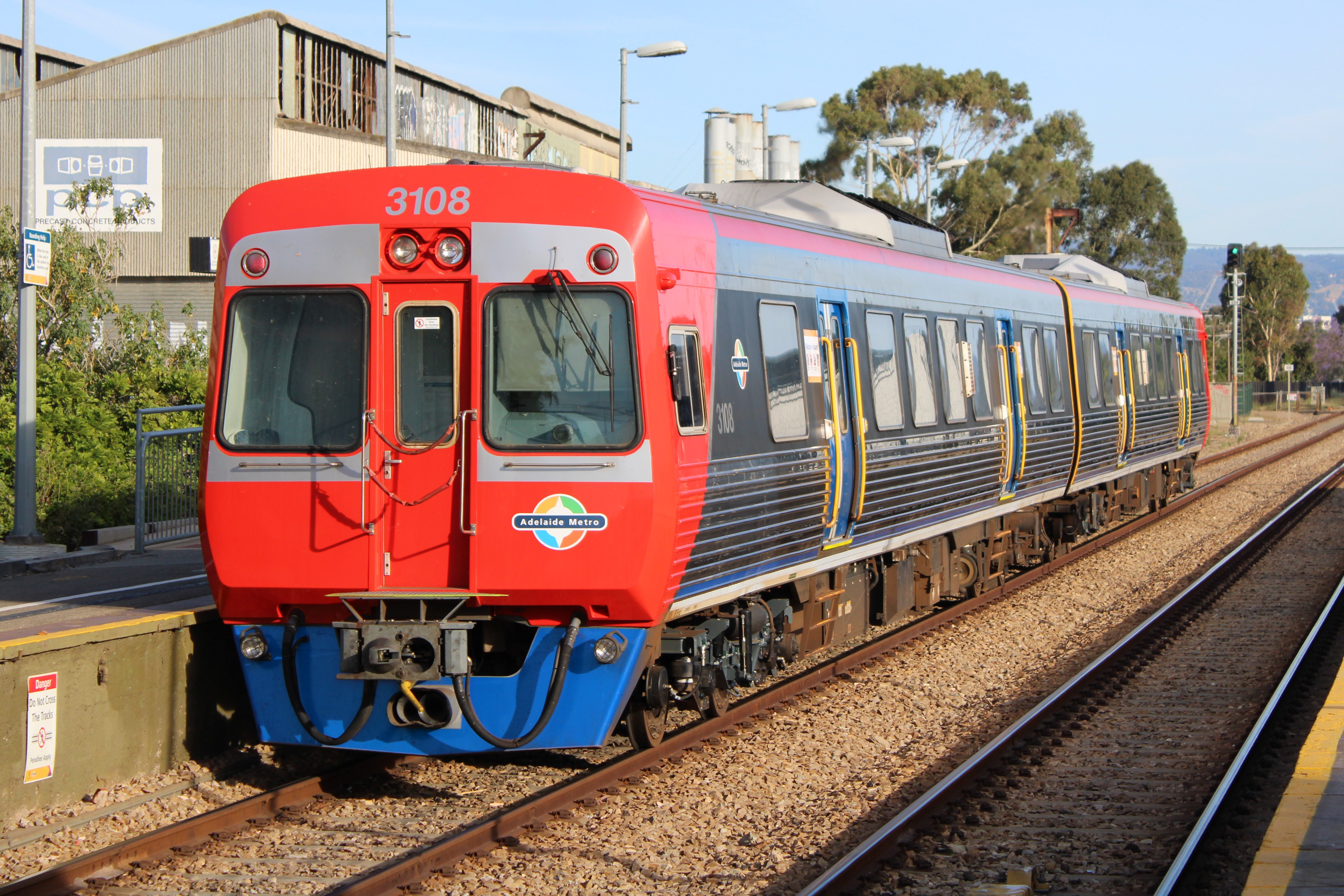
- Railcar 3108 at Kilkenny station, November 2019

General information
- Location: Kilkenny Road, Kilkenny
- Coordinates: 34°53′10″S 138°32′59″E
- Owner: Department for Infrastructure & Transport
- Operator: Adelaide Metro
- Line: Grange Outer Harbor Port Dock
- Distance: 6 km from Adelaide
- Platforms: 2
- Tracks: 2
- Bus routes: J8 (Kilkenny Road); 150, 155, 157 (Port Road)
- Connections: Bus

Construction
- Structure type: Side platform
- Parking: No
- Cycle facilities: No
- Accessible: Yes

Other information
- Station code: 16531 (to City); 18448 (to Outer Harbor, Port Dock & Grange)
- Website: Adelaide Metro

History
- Opened: c. 1881

Services
Preceding station	Adelaide Metro	Following station
West Croydon towards Adelaide	Grange line	Woodville Park towards Grange
West Croydon towards Adelaide	Outer Harbor line	Woodville Park towards Osborne or Outer Harbor
West Croydon towards Adelaide	Port Dock line	Woodville Park towards Port Dock
Location

Kilkenny railway station is located on the Grange, Outer Harbor and Port Dock lines. Situated in the western Adelaide suburb of Kilkenny, it is six kilometres from Adelaide station.

== History ==
The railway line from Adelaide to Port Adelaide opened in April 1856, but for the first 25 years, there was no station at Kilkenny. Kilkenny station was built when the single track Port Adelaide railway was duplicated in 1881. Later, a network of goods sidings was subsequently installed on both sides of the main line to serve various factories which were established in the vicinity. By the early years of the 20th century, there were two signal cabins at Kilkenny – one at the Adelaide end of the station controlling access to sidings, the other at the Woodville Park end controlling the level crossing across David Terrace. In 1930, three-aspect colour-light signalling was installed on this section of the Port line in an effort to accommodate the close headways necessary with the heavy traffic of that era.

Kilkenny was busy with both passengers and goods by virtue of the industrial activity in the area. However, as heavy industries declined in the 1960s and 1970s, so did traffic to and from the station. The goods sidings were closed in September 1977 and were subsequently removed, along with the signal cabin. The nearby industrial factories were demolished in November 2018.

== Services by platform ==
Platform	Lines	Destinations	Notes
1	Grange	all stops services to Grange	
1	Outer Harbor	limited stops services to Outer Harbor	
1	Port Dock	all stops services to Port Dock	
2	Grange	all stops services to Adelaide	
2	Outer Harbor	limited stops services to Adelaide	
2	Port Dock	all stops services to Adelaide	

== Transport links ==
Bus transfers: Stop 15 (Kilkenny Road)
Route no.	Destination & route details
J8	Marion via West Lakes, Arndale, Adelaide Airport & Marion Rd
J8	West Lakes via Marion Interchange, Marion Rd, Adelaide Airport & Arndale
