= Hendon railway station, Adelaide =

Former railway station in South Australia, Australia

Hendon

General information
- Location: West Lakes Boulevard; Hendon
- Coordinates: 34.8797°S 138.5146°E
- Line: Hendon
- Distance: 10.2 km from Adelaide

History
- Opened: 1940
- Closed: 1980

Services
Preceding station	TransAdelaide	Following station
Albert Park towards Adelaide	Grange line	Terminus
Location

Hendon railway station was the only station on the Hendon branch line in the western Adelaide suburb of Hendon. Used mainly for industrial purposes in the mid-20th century, the line diverged from Albert Park station and ran for 1.1 kilometres.

== History ==
The station opened in November 1940 to serve Small Arms Ammunition Factories Nos. 3 and 4 at Hendon during World War II. The station was located east of Tapleys Hill Road and was an island platform with sidings but the track was single for the entire length. After the war, rail traffic declined and passenger services at Hendon were reduced to morning and afternoon peak hours only, providing services to residents and workers of factories established in the old munitions factories, including Philips Electrical Industries and the South Australian Brush Company. Ownership was transferred from the Commonwealth Government to South Australian Railways in 1951.

Passenger trains to and from Hendon ran through to Woodville or Adelaide, and after the end of World War II, the Hendon trains only operated at industrial shift-change times. In spite of low passenger numbers, the service continued operation until 1 February 1980, after which the line was closed and removed. There is no evidence of the station or track left, and the trackbed of the Hendon branch now forms part of the eastern end of West Lakes Boulevard, a main approach road to the suburb of West Lakes and the Westfield West Lakes shopping mall.
