= Military road =

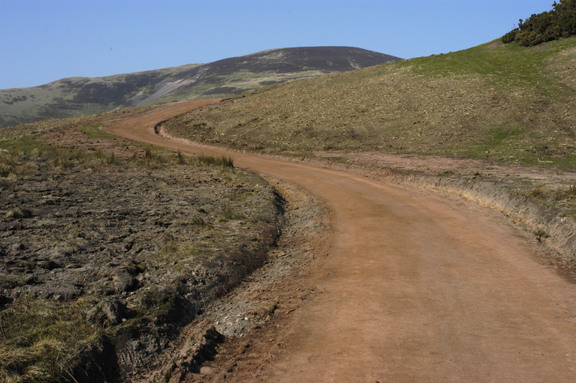
18th-century military road in Castlelaw, Scotland

A military road is a type of road built by an armed force of a country, which is usually responsible for its access, control, and maintenance.

It is used mostly by soldiers, government officials, and sometimes the public. Most military roads are not accessible by public vehicles. However, some are designated and maintained as state highways. Some military roads are known as government access roads since the military is a part of the government. Anyone who is not a government official who drives on such a private road is usually summoned or prosecuted.

Military roads played a significant role in wars of the 1700s. They linked important cities during wars, as well as vital links for commercial and telegraph use. Swamps and streams were large obstacles during the building of military roads in various locations in the United States.

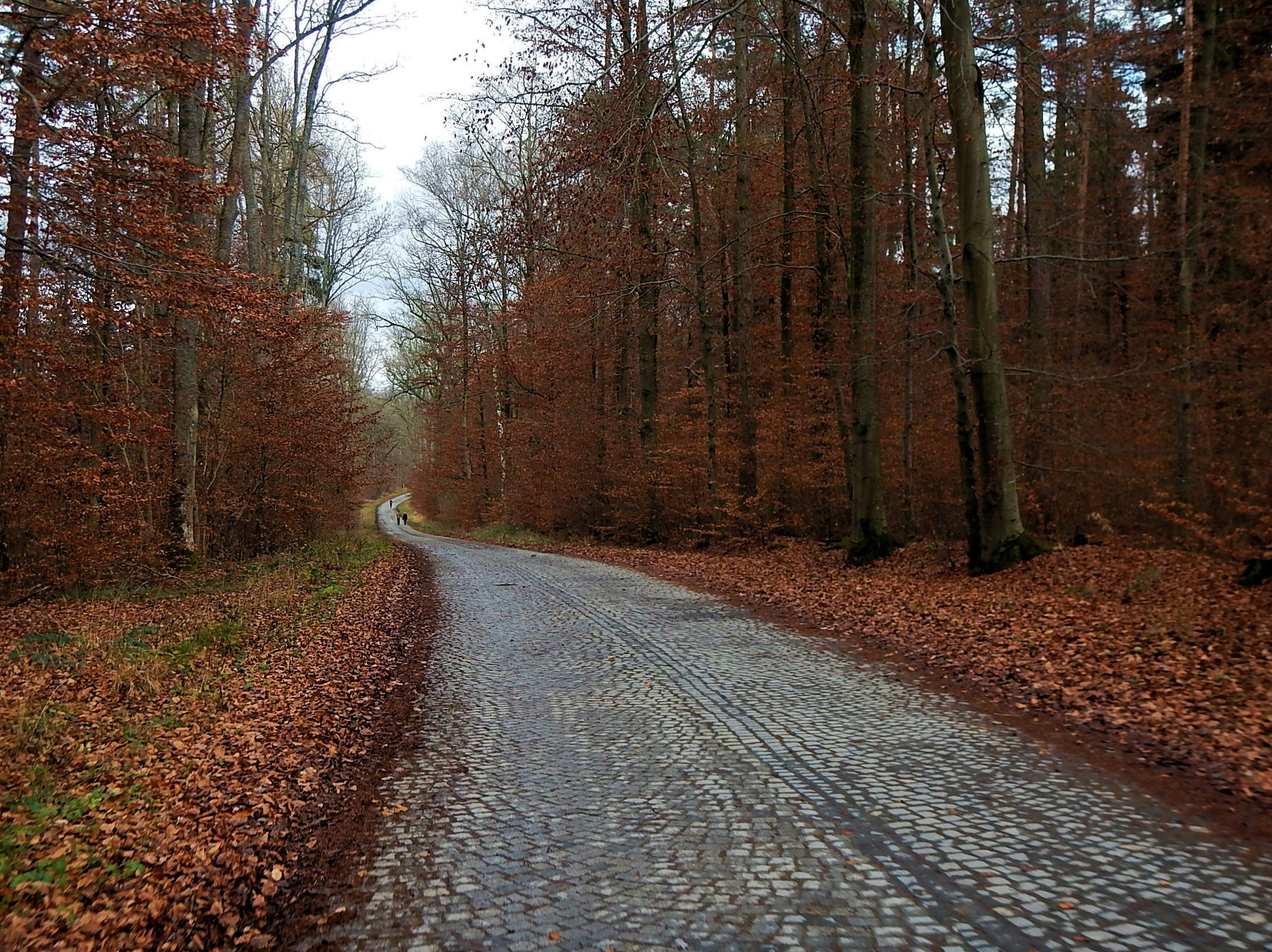
Tank trail built ca. 1938 in Germany, connecting today's Patch Barracks and Panzer Kaserne

== See also ==
- List of established military terms
- List of military roads
