= Croydon railway station, Adelaide =

Railway station in Adelaide, South Australia

Croydon
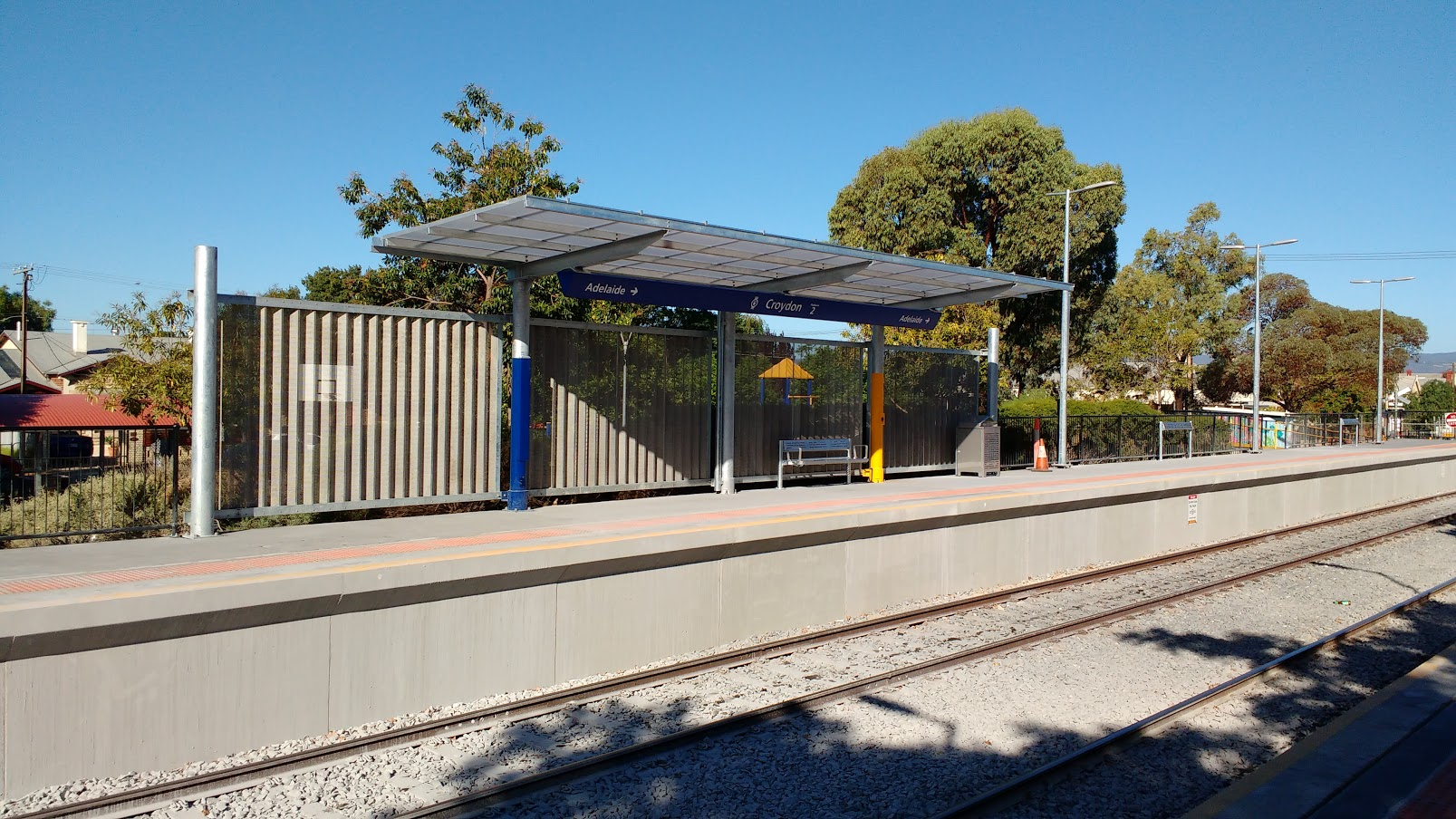
- Station shelter on Platform 1, March 2018

General information
- Location: Euston Terrace, Croydon
- Coordinates: 34°53′50″S 138°33′50″E
- Owner: Department for Infrastructure & Transport
- Operator: Adelaide Metro
- Line: Grange Outer Harbor Port Dock
- Distance: 4.2 km from Adelaide
- Platforms: 2
- Tracks: 2
- Bus routes: 150, 155, 157 (Port Road)
- Connections: Bus

Construction
- Structure type: Ground
- Parking: No
- Cycle facilities: No
- Accessible: Yes → level boarding

Other information
- Station code: 16505 (to City); 18444 (to Outer Harbor, Port Dock & Grange)
- Website: Adelaide Metro

History
- Opened: 1888
- Rebuilt: 2018

Services
Preceding station	Adelaide Metro	Following station
Bowden towards Adelaide	Grange line	West Croydon towards Grange
Bowden towards Adelaide	Outer Harbor line	West Croydon towards Osborne or Outer Harbor
Bowden towards Adelaide	Port Dock line	West Croydon towards Port Dock
Location

Croydon railway station is located on the Grange, Outer Harbor and Port Dock lines. Situated in the western Adelaide suburb of Croydon, it is 4.2 kilometres from Adelaide station.

== History ==
Croydon station opened in 1888, with the station buildings and platforms transferred from the former Torrens Bridge station. The station has been unattended by staff since 1981. The provides easy access to the popular Queen Street/Elizabeth Street cafe and retro shop strip, as well as a children's park. Wheelchair access ramps and sheltered seating areas are located on both platforms.

Lights displaying the warning 'Caution More Than One Train' were present at pedestrian crossings near the station between 2009 and 2017 as part of an Adelaide-wide crossing safety upgrade program. These lights are illuminated when more than one train is due to warn pedestrians waiting to cross the line that another train will be following quickly after the first has passed. They were removed in 2018 when the pedestrian crossings were upgraded to active protection.

Whilst it had been previously proposed that as part of an upgrade to South Road, the station would be elevated and potentially relocated to the east as part of a grade separation project, the final design adopted a shorter rail overpass option allowing the station to remain in its current location.

== Upgrade ==
In October 2017, it was announced that the station would be demolished in its entirety to remove a speed restriction on passing trains due to the relatively narrow width of the rail corridor in between the platforms. The rebuilt station features completely new platforms that are the same height as the train floor, as well as new shelters, seating and lighting. The pedestrian crossing points at the adjacent level crossing was also upgraded to 'active crossings' meaning that gates will open and close automatically to prevent pedestrians from entering the rail corridor whilst trains are passing. Construction was originally expected to be completed by the reopening of the train line in January 2018, however, works continued until May with the platforms remaining open for train passengers during most of this time.

== Services by platform ==
Platform	Lines	Destinations
1	Grange	all stops services to Grange
1	Outer Harbor	limited stops services to Outer Harbor
1	Port Dock	all stops services to Port Dock
2	Grange	all stops services to Adelaide
2	Outer Harbor	limited stops services to Adelaide
2	Port Dock	all stops services to Adelaide
