= Woodville Park railway station =

Railway station in Adelaide, South Australia

Woodville Park
- View of the station with an 3000 class railcar at the station, January 2008

General information
- Location: Belmore Terrace, Woodville Park
- Coordinates: 34.8814°S 138.5435°E
- Owner: Department for Infrastructure & Transport
- Operator: Adelaide Metro
- Line: Grange Outer Harbor Port Dock
- Distance: 6.8 km from Adelaide
- Platforms: 2
- Tracks: 2
- Connections: None

Construction
- Structure type: Island platform
- Parking: Yes
- Cycle facilities: No
- Accessible: Yes

Other information
- Station code: 16572 (to City); 18450 (to Outer Harbor, Port Dock & Grange)
- Website: Adelaide Metro

History
- Opened: 1936

Services
Preceding station	Adelaide Metro	Following station
Kilkenny towards Adelaide	Grange line	Woodville towards Grange
Kilkenny towards Adelaide	Outer Harbor line	Woodville towards Osborne or Outer Harbor
Kilkenny towards Adelaide	Port Dock line	Woodville towards Port Dock
Location

Woodville Park railway station is located on the Grange, Outer Harbor and Port Dock lines. Situated in the western Adelaide suburb of Woodville Park, it is 6.8 kilometres from Adelaide station.

== History ==
This station was built in 1936.

Although the surrounding suburb was built in the 1870s, a station was not provided until December 1936. It was the first station on the line to have an island platform. The station has been unattended since 1980.

== Services by platform ==
Platform	Lines	Destinations	Notes
1	Grange	all stops services to Grange	
1	Outer Harbor	limited stops services to Outer Harbor	
1	Port Dock	all stops services to Port Dock	
2	Grange	all stops services to Adelaide	
2	Outer Harbor	limited stops services to Adelaide	
2	Port Dock	all stops services to Adelaide	
