= Bowden railway station =

Railway station in Adelaide, South Australia

Bowden
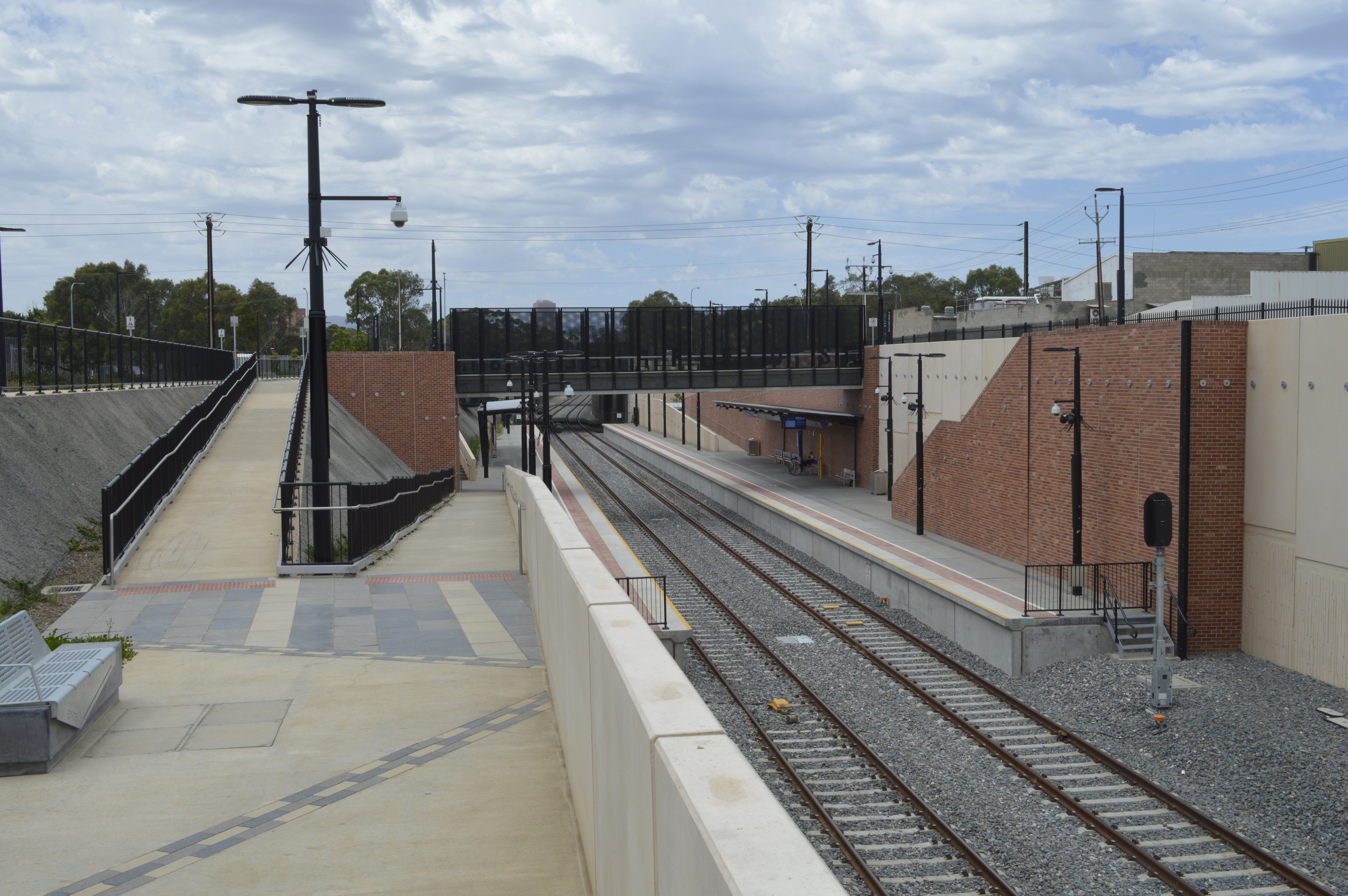
- Newly built Bowden station platforms in December 2018, looking south-east towards Adelaide's city centre

General information
- Location: Gibson Street, Bowden
- Coordinates: 34°54′22″S 138°34′33″E
- Owner: Department for Infrastructure & Transport
- Operator: Adelaide Metro
- Line: Grange Outer Harbor Port Dock
- Distance: 2.5 km (1.6 mi) 2.7 km by rail from Adelaide railway station
- Platforms: 2
- Tracks: 2
- Connections: Bus; Tram

Construction
- Structure type: Ground
- Parking: No
- Cycle facilities: Yes
- Accessible: Yes → level boarding

Other information
- Station code: 16496 (to City); 18442 (to Outer Harbor, Port Dock & Grange)
- Website: Adelaide Metro

History
- Opened: 1856
- Rebuilt: 2018

Services
| Preceding station | Adelaide Metro | Following station |
|---|---|---|
| Adelaide Terminus | Grange line | Croydon towards Grange |
| Adelaide Terminus | Outer Harbor line | Croydon towards Osborne or Outer Harbor |
| Adelaide Terminus | Port Dock line | Croydon towards Port Dock |
Location

Bowden railway station is located on the Adelaide suburban railway line leading to the Grange, Outer Harbor and Port Dock lines, commonly known as the Port line. Situated in the inner Adelaide suburb of Bowden, it is 2.5 kilometres (1.6 miles) from Adelaide station. Originally opened in 1856, it was extensively rebuilt as part of a flying junction in 2017 and reopened in 2018.

== History ==
Bowden was one of the original stations on the Adelaide to Port Adelaide railway when the line opened in April 1856. Heritage-listed, it is one of the oldest in Australia. In 1871, sidings were constructed at the Woodville end of the station for delivery of coal from Port Adelaide to the adjacent gasworks. With increasing traffic, the single track Adelaide to Port Adelaide line was duplicated in 1881, and the sidings at Bowden were extended as the gasworks expanded. Two signal cabins were in operation at Bowden between 1884 and 1930: one at East Street (at the Woodville end), the second at Gibson Street (at the Adelaide end). The East Street cabin was closed when colour-light signalling was introduced on the Port line in the 1930s.

The SA Gas Company sidings were closed in 1973 and Bowden's goods yard was closed completely from 1977 along with the Gibson Street signal cabin. The site of the gasworks sidings is still visible on the north side of the line near the Chief Street underpass. With falling passenger numbers, the station was unattended after 1979 – in marked contrast to the middle years of the 20th century, when patronage justified staffed ticket offices on both platforms. In 2016, the station was ranked as one of the better stations in the western suburbs based on five criteria.

=== Redevelopment ===
Bowden station was significantly redeveloped as a part of the Torrens Rail Junction Project, which lowered the station's tracks as part of grade separation for a flying junction to enable the Outer Harbor and Grange lines to pass under the Adelaide-Port Augusta line and Gawler line. The original south-side (outbound) platform was closed in April 2017 and demolished shortly afterwards, retaining a section of the platform and the original station's 1856 brick and stone station building located on it. The north-side (city-bound) platform was closed in September, along with the entire Outer Harbor and Grange lines, to facilitate construction of the rail junction.

The Loose Caboose café, which had opened in 2012 in the otherwise unused station building on the south-side platform, continued to operate; the platform is now in use as a pedestrian walkway.

The new Bowden station was opened in January 2018 together with the Outer Harbor and Grange lines.

== Services by platform ==
| Platform | Lines | Destinations |
|---|---|---|
| 1 | Grange | all stops services to Grange |
| 1 | Outer Harbor | limited stops services to Outer Harbor |
| 1 | Port Dock | all stops services to Port Dock |
| 2 | Grange | all stops services to Adelaide |
| 2 | Outer Harbor | limited stops services to Adelaide |
| 2 | Port Dock | all stops services to Adelaide |

== Transport Connections ==
The closest bus stop to Bowden station is Stop 6 on Port Road:
150 City – Osborne
155 City – Westfield West Lakes
157 City – Largs Bay

Bowden station is also near the Entertainment Centre tram station:

Glenelg Entertainment Centre – Moseley Square (peak hour only)
Glenelg Entertainment Centre – Botanic Garden
