= Holdens railway station =

Defunct railway station in Adelaide, Australia

Coordinates: 34°52′32″S 138°32′00″E

Holdens railway station Woodville, South Australia

General information
- Location: Rowley Terrace; Woodville
- Line: Grange Line
- Distance: 7.8 km (4.8 mi) from Adelaide
- Platforms: 3 (island plus single platform for Holden's employees)
- Tracks: 3

Construction
- Structure type: 2 small shelters

History
- Opened: 1928
- Closed: 1992
Location

Holdens railway station (originally Holden's) was opened in 1928 on the Henley Beach railway line (now shortened as the Grange line) in the western Adelaide suburb of Woodville, 7.8 kilometres (4.8 miles) from Adelaide station. Only 200 metres (220 yards) from the junction on to the Henley Beach line, it served the site on which General Motors-Holden's Ltd manufactured motor vehicles. The factory and station closed in 1992, and the site was subsequently redeveloped, mainly with large retail outlets.

== History ==
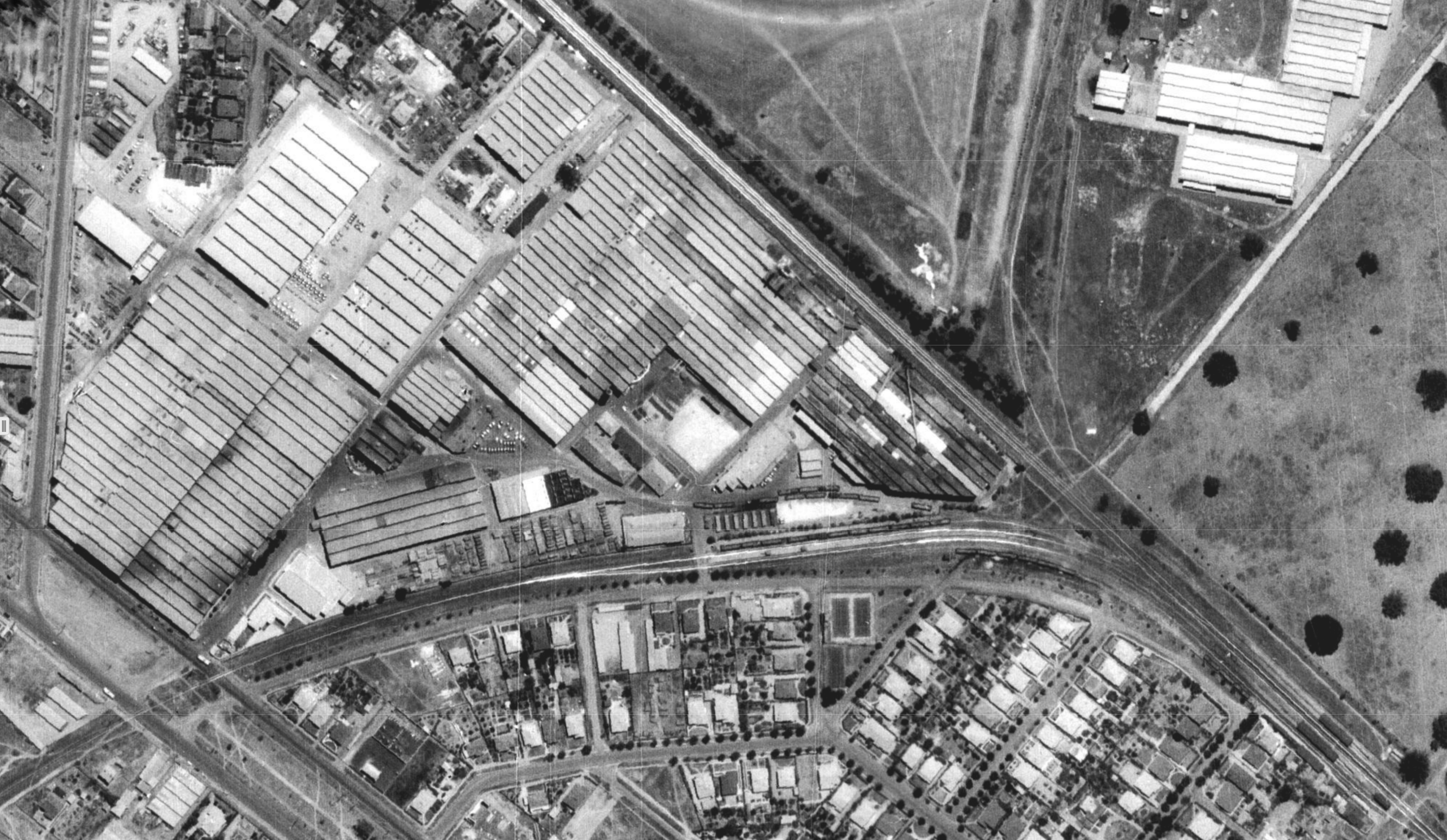
The General Motors–Holden's Woodville site in 1949. Holden's railway station is just outside the company's southern boundary; the sidings are visible within the property. Woodville station is at bottom right.

Holden's Motor Body Builders Ltd had operated since 1917 from 400 King William Street, at the southern end of Adelaide's central business district. Expanding business prompted the company to build a new site at Woodville in 1923. Occupying 16 hectares (40 acres), it was bounded by the Port railway line and the 7.8-kilometre (4.8-mile) Henley Beach branch line. A 600-metre (660-yard) siding within the works joined the branch line near two passenger platforms; trains conveyed sheet steel in and automotive bodies out. From 1924, the factory's output increased further when it began supplying car bodies for the US General Motors in Australia, and later providing bodies to fit on to imported chassis. In 1931, General Motors–Holden's Ltd (GMH) was incorporated to run a then very successful business. In turn, this provided substantial railway traffic.

Before 1955, when double-ended railcars operated the passenger services, a locomotive-hauled train would proceed past Holden's to Albert Park or Hendon, further along the branch line. There the locomotive would run around the train via a passing loop before returning to Holden's. In earlier times some trains from Adelaide ran only as far as Holden's, before reversing to Woodville to continue along the Port line to Semaphore.

With the outbreak of war in 1939, manufacturing production throughout Australia increased greatly by mobilising resources and manpower, materials and productive capacity. Manufacturing capacity at Holden's was expanded and redirected to the war effort. Reflecting the large increase in the workforce, a third platform was erected for commuting workers during the war. This configuration supplemented the existing island platform, which was straddled by two tracks that merged to single track a short distance beyond the station.

Freight and passenger traffic declined after the war. In 1955, out of 29 return weekday movements on the Henley Beach line, four were to Holden's at change-of-shift times.

In 1963, General Motors–Holden's opened a new plant at Elizabeth and as a consequence traffic to the Woodville factory was further reduced. In 1992, both factories closed; the station and siding were subsequently removed.

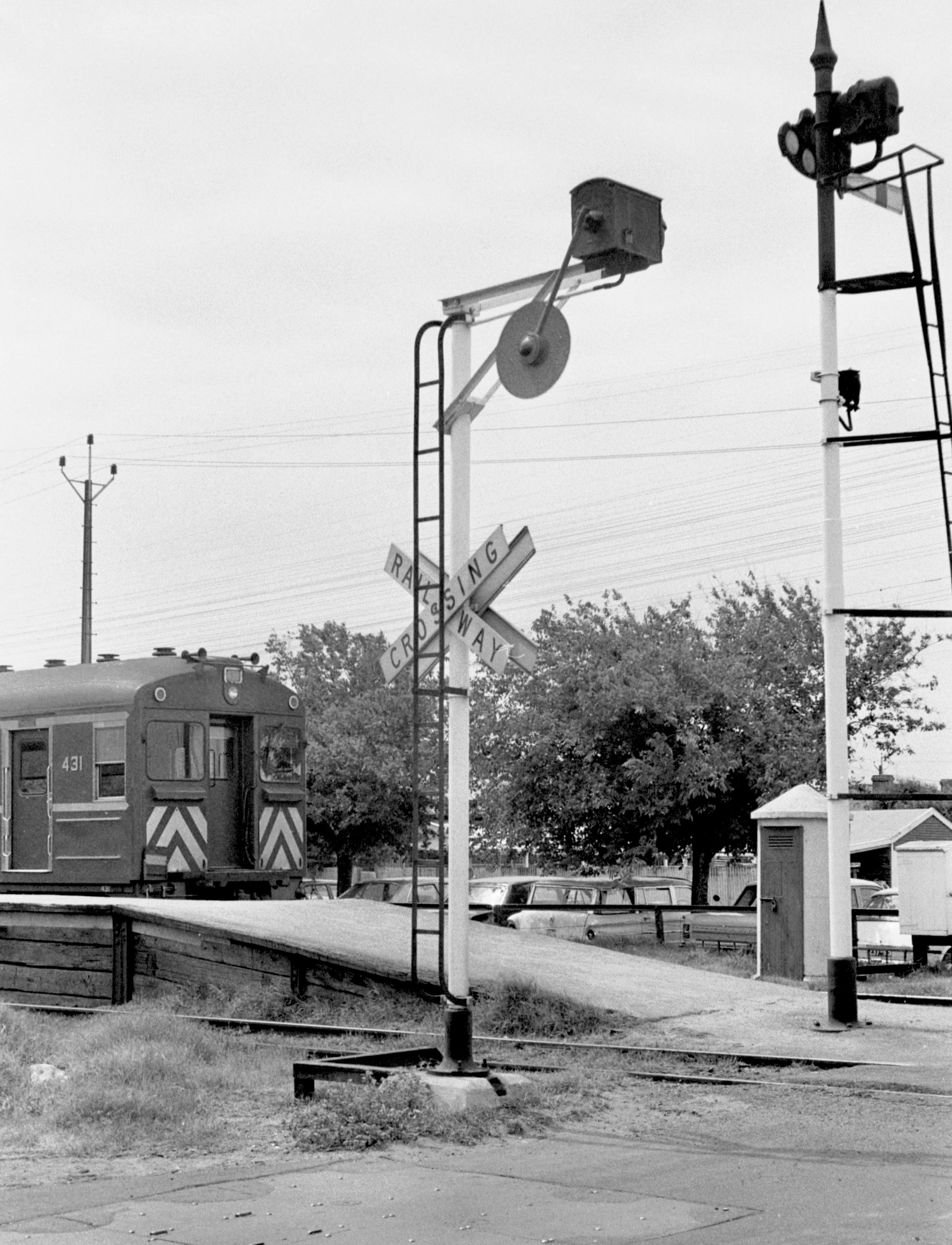
In 1972, "Red Hen" railcar no. 431 awaits the signal to depart Holdens station while the oscillating "wig-wag" warns traffic at the level crossing
