= List of military roads =

The following is a list of military roads worldwide.

== Australia ==
- Part of the A8 (Sydney) between Neutral Bay and Mosman
- Military Road, part of Route 39, Melbourne
- Military Road, off Wanneroo Road just north of Yanchep National Park, Western Australia
- Military Road, Adelaide, running parallel to the coast, between Fort Largs and Henley Beach South, and extending south of the River Torrens through West Beach to the Patawalonga

== Canada ==
- Macleod-Benton Trail

== Europe ==
Many mountain roads in the Alps

- Strada delle 52 Gallerie in Italy

== Georgia ==
- Georgian Military Road, between Tbilisi (Georgia) and Vladikavkaz (Russia), following the traditional route used by invaders and traders

== Indonesia ==
- The Great Post Road

== Ireland ==
- Military Road (R115), built in the wake of the 1798 Irish rebellion to give British forces access to the Wicklow Hills where many Irish rebels sought refuge.

== Roman Empire ==
- Many Roman military roads were built across the Roman Empire. They extended throughout much of Europe but also into the Near East and north Africa.

== United Kingdom ==
- The Roman Military Road built as part of Hadrian's Wall
- Any of numerous roads constructed throughout the Scottish Highlands by General Wade or Major William Caulfeild in the middle of the 18th century aimed at suppressing the Jacobite rebellion.
- A section of the A3055 road built as part of the regional fortification on the Isle of Wight in the late 19th century.
- Military Road (Northumberland), a local name for a portion of the B6318 road between Heddon-on-the-Wall to Greenhead.

== United States ==
- Fort Walla Walla–Fort Colville Military Road, built in 1859 route between Fort Walla Walla and Fort Colville by Pinkney City, Washington in Washington Territory.
- Jackson's Military Road, a route from Nashville, Tennessee to New Orleans, Louisiana. The route later became part of the Jackson Highway
- Hernández–Capron Trail, a military trail cut through Central Florida for the Second Seminole War by General Joseph Marion Hernández
- Hubbardton Military Road, an American Revolutionary War trail connecting fortifications on Lake Champlain with settlements
- Macleod-Benton Trail
- Memphis to Little Rock Road
- Military Ridge Road, a/k/a the Old Military Road, An 1830s road connecting Fort Howard in Green Bay, Fond du Lac, Fort Winnebago in Portage and Fort Crawford in Prairie du Chien Wisconsin.
- Military Road (Arlington, Virginia), an American Civil War road built in Arlington County, Virginia, in 1861 which is now a major north–south thoroughfare.
- Military Road (Michigan), which runs between U.S. Route 127 and Camp Grayling.
- Military Road (Michigan) near the city of Port Huron.
- Military Road (New Jersey), the route from Elizabeth, New Jersey to fortifications built in 1755-1756 along the Delaware River during the French and Indian War
- Mullan Road, built in 1859 to provide an overland route for troops and settlers from Fort Benton, Montana to Fort Walla Walla (Washington).
- New York State Route 265, the Military Road located in Erie County, New York and Niagara County, New York, built for the War of 1812.
- Military Road (Omaha), a segment of which is listed on the National Register of Historic Places
- Military Road (Washington, D.C.), an American Civil War road built in the northwest quadrant of the District of Columbia, and now a parkway.
- Point Douglas to Superior Military Road, Minnesota, built beginning in 1852 as a way to move troops north from Prescott, Wisconsin, to Superior, Wisconsin. It faded after the arrival of the railroads in 1870, but remains historically marked along MN 23 and TH 123 (MN).
