= Albert Park railway station, Adelaide =

Railway station in Adelaide, South Australia

Albert Park
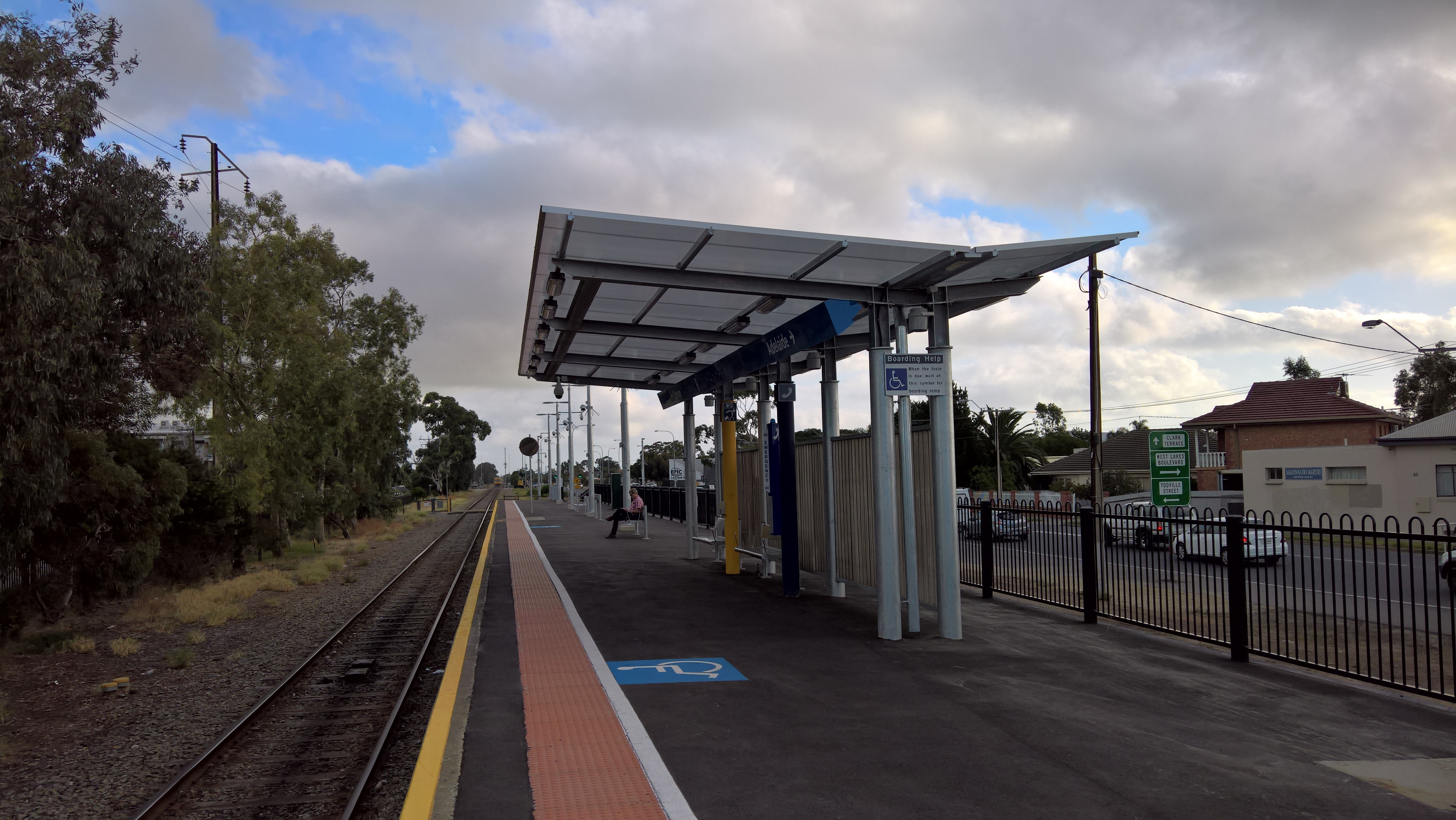
- Albert Park station in 2017

General information
- Location: West Lakes Boulevard, Albert Park
- Coordinates: 34°52′56″S 138°31′22″E
- Owner: Department for Infrastructure & Transport
- Operator: Adelaide Metro
- Line: Grange
- Distance: 9.1 km from Adelaide
- Platforms: 1
- Tracks: 1
- Bus routes: J7, J7M, 155,157
- Connections: Bus

Construction
- Structure type: Ground, side platform
- Parking: Yes
- Cycle facilities: No
- Accessible: Yes

Other information
- Station code: 16491 (to City); 18454 (to Grange)
- Website: Adelaide Metro

History
- Opened: 1882
- Rebuilt: 2017

Services
Preceding station	Adelaide Metro	Following station
Woodville towards Adelaide	Grange line	Seaton Park towards Grange
Location

Albert Park railway station is located on the Grange line. Situated in the western Adelaide suburb of Albert Park, it is 9.1 kilometres from Adelaide station.

== History ==
The railway line between Woodville and Grange opened in September 1882. It was a private railway, constructed by the Grange Railway and Investment Company, and Albert Park at this time was a simple request stop on the line. For most of its lifetime, Albert Park has been a single platform station on a single track branch line. Modifications to the track layout at Woodville station in 1909 enabled trains from the Grange branch to travel beyond Woodville into Adelaide.

In November 1940, a station at Hendon opened; the tracks diverged from the Grange line at Albert Park. It closed in 1980. In connection with this, Albert Park was rebuilt as a junction station with a crossing loop, an island platform, ticket office and signal cabin.

The ticket office and signal cabin at Albert Park were closed on 15 November 1981 and the crossing loop was taken out of service. The mechanically operated lower quadrant semaphore signals at Albert Park were the last such installation on the State Transport Authority suburban passenger system (although other lower-quadrant signals on Australian National track at Gillman Yard, Port Adelaide survived until the early 1990s). The layout at Albert Park was rationalised, resulting in the simple layout and basic facilities provided today. The station was rebuilt in early 2017 while the entire railway line was closed to allow for a railway bridge to be constructed over South Road.

== Services by platform ==
Platform	Lines	Destinations
1	Grange	All stops services to Grange & Adelaide
