= Grange line =

Railway line in South Australia

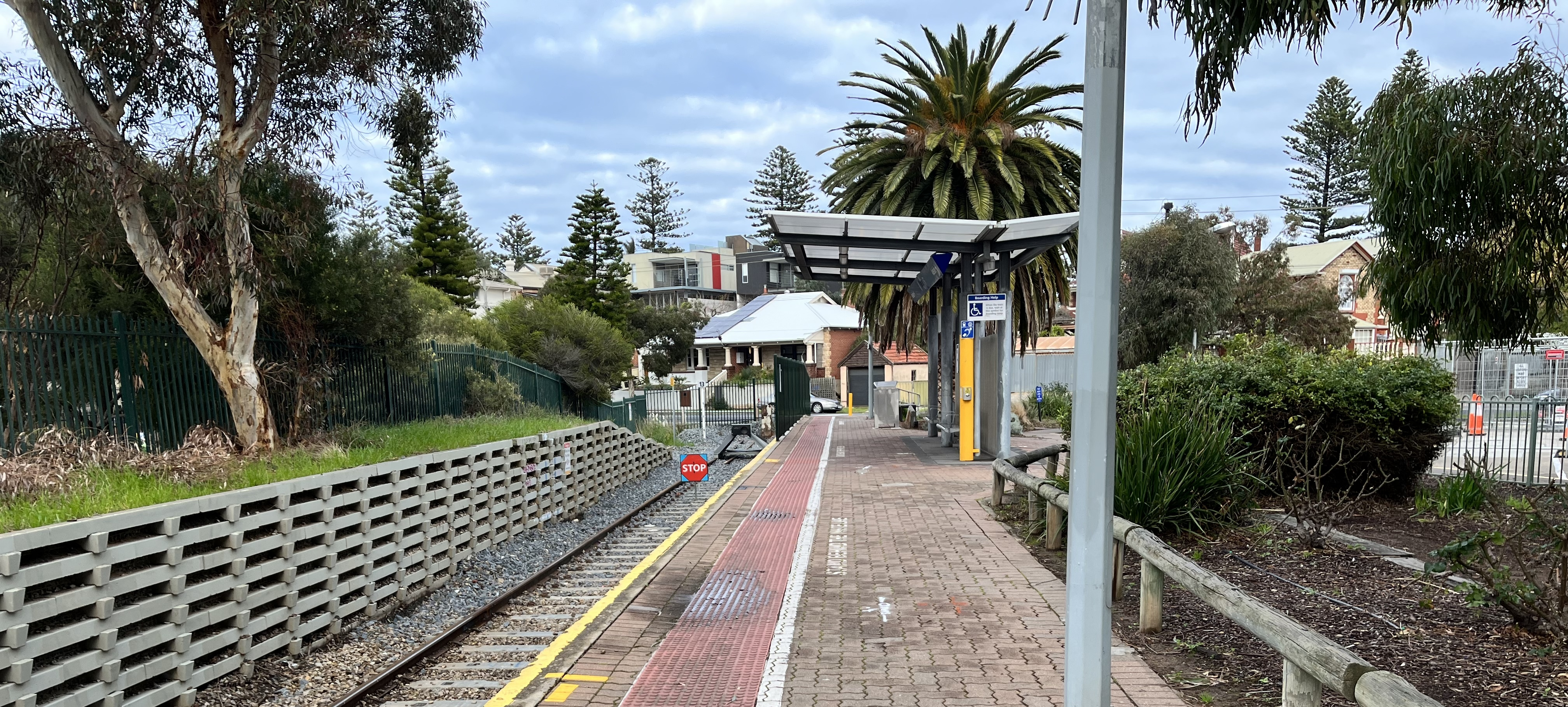
- The 3rd Grange railway station, opened in 1986

Overview
- Locale: Adelaide, South Australia
- Termini: Woodville (services extend to Adelaide); Grange
- Stations: 4

Service
- Type: Commuter rail
- Route number: GRNG
- Operator: Adelaide Metro
- Rolling stock: 3000/3100 class diesel-electric railcar

History
- Opened: September 1882
- Upgraded, including concrete sleepers: 2010

Technical
- Line length: 7.8 km (4.8 mi)
- Number of tracks: 1
- Track gauge: 1600 mm (5 ft 3 in)

The Grange line is a suburban railway branch line in the Adelaide conurbation, South Australia, which starts at Woodville railway station, 7.6 kilometres (4.7 miles) from Adelaide railway station on the Outer Harbor line, and ends at Grange railway station, 7.8 kilometres (4.8 miles) from Woodville. Services on the line continue beyond Woodville to and from Adelaide. The line was opened in 1882 by a land development company and was unprofitable almost from the start. The South Australian Railways operated it from 1891 and purchased it in 1894, when it was also extended 2.5 kilometres (1.6 miles) south from Grange to Henley Beach. After 73 years, the line was shortened to its original Grange terminus in 1957.

== History ==
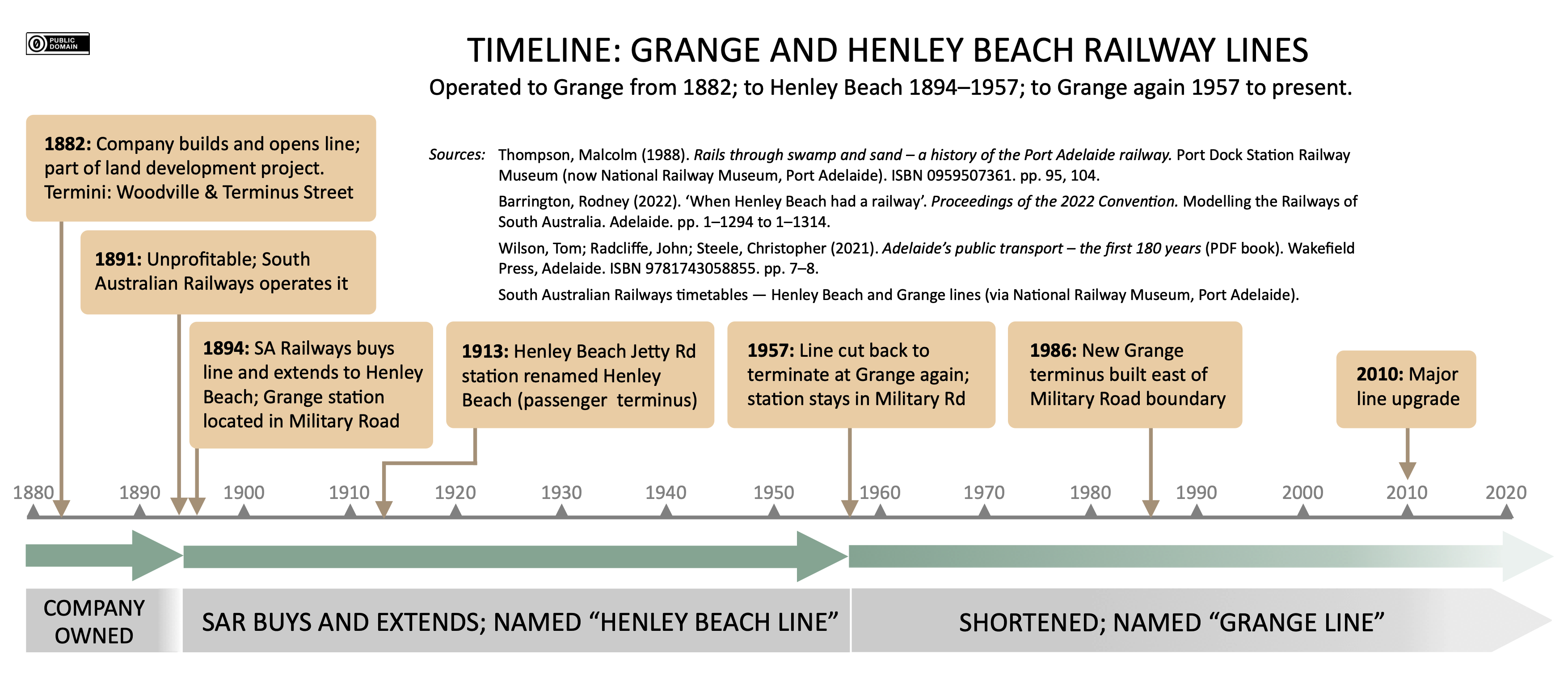
Key events in the operation of the Grange line and its extension, the Henley Beach line

Key events in the Grange and Henley Beach line are shown in the adjacent timeline.

=== Company operation ===
In September 1882, a line was opened on the present-day route from Woodville to Grange by the Grange Railway and Investment Company. Unlike the Adelaide to Port Adelaide route from which it branched, which was built and operated by the South Australian Government, the Grange line was operated by this private company to encourage sales at its beachside real estate development project. The new line started at a bay platform at Woodville. Although there was a connection to the main line there, differing couplers prevented Grange line trains from continuing to Adelaide.

=== Government take-over ===
The railway company, with its rolling stock of two locomotives and four carriages, was not a financial success and was forced to operate on a shoestring budget soon after the start. Following its collapse, the South Australian Railways (SAR) took over operation in 1891, using a Rowan steam tram in place of the more conventional locomotive and carriages. The state government finally directed the SAR to buy the company's assets in 1894, when it was also extended, as the Henley Beach railway line, from Grange southwards to Henley Beach along Military Road. Following modifications to the track layout at Woodville station in 1909, it became possible for trains from the Henley Beach and Grange branch lines to travel beyond Woodville to Adelaide.

=== Extensions ===
In addition to the 2.5 kilometres (1.6 miles) extension south to Henley Beach built in 1894, three other extensions were undertaken over the history of the line:

- From about 1917 to the 1930s, a branch line joined the Grange line at Seaton Park to convey gravel deposits quarried, west of Findon Road, between Grange Road and Angley Avenue, in the suburb of Findon. Sixteen single-horse scoops dumped the gravel on a grid, from where it was taken by elevator to load the rail trucks. A steam locomotive took one train per day.
- In 1928, a station, with sidings, was opened to service a new motor vehicle factory built by General Motors-Holden's Ltd. In 1935 it was named Holden's; the apostrophe was dropped, as with nearly all Australian place names, in the 1970s. Only 200 metres (220 yards) from the junction at Woodville on the Grange line (at that stage extended as the Henley Beach line). Long platforms on the line outside the works provided for large numbers of workers at shift-change times. The factory and station closed in 1992, and the site was subsequently redeveloped, mainly with large retail outlets.
- In 1940, a station was opened at the end of a 1.1-kilometre (0.68-mile) spur at Hendon. The line to the station diverged from the Grange line at Albert Park station, 1.6 kilometres (1.0 mile) from Woodville, and ran to the Hendon munition works. After World War II ended, Hendon trains operated only at shift-change times. In spite of low passenger numbers, the service continued operation until February 1980, when the station was closed and the rail corridor repurposed as the eastern end of West Lakes Boulevard.

The terminus at Grange was relocated in 1986 to the eastern side of Military Road to eliminate a level crossing. Between 1894 and 1957, the station was a stop on the Henley Beach line, a 2.5-kilometre (1.6-mile) extension of the Grange line which closed in 1957.

Until 1996, Grange line services previously operated as a shuttle from Woodville station at night and on weekends, connecting with Outer Harbor line services.

=== Renewal ===
The South Australian Government previously considered either electrifying the Outer Harbor line or converting it to light rail. A light rail conversion would have necessitated the conversion or closure of the Grange line.

A 2016 report evaluating potential light rail projects in Adelaide outlined four options for the Grange line:

- Option 1: Electrify the existing heavy rail line without further modifications.
- Option 2: Convert the Grange line to light rail and construct a new on-street branch from Albert Park station to West Lakes.
- Option 3: Implement the West Lakes extension and replace the remainder of the Grange line with a new light rail route along Grange Road.
- Option 4: Create a light rail corridor along Grange Road with a West Lakes spur branching from it, effectively replacing the entire existing railway.

These proposals were abandoned following the 2018 South Australian state election, when the incoming Marshall Government announced its intention to concentrate transit development within the city centre only.

From 2 to 23 January 2017, both the Outer Harbor and Grange lines were closed to allow for construction of an overpass at South Road. During this closure, track between Woodville station and Port Road was replaced, and Albert Park station was rebuilt.

Both lines were closed again – along with part of the Gawler line – for four months in 2017 for works related to the Torrens Rail Junction Project.

The entire line was again closed on 24 September 2017 and reopened on 15 January 2018.

== Route ==
The line runs from Woodville railway station to the seaside suburb of Grange; the service extends, additionally, from Adelaide railway station. Grange trains follow the alignment of the Outer Harbor and Port Dock lines as far as Woodville station, where it diverges south-west and crosses Port Road. The line then travels through Albert Park and bisects the Royal Adelaide Golf Club links between Seaton Park and East Grange stations. Apart from 550 metres (600 yards) of double track at the Woodville end, the line is single track throughout, with no passing loops. All stations on the line are unattended and have only basic passenger waiting facilities. The line, of 1600 mm (5 ft 3 in) broad gauge, is 5.5 kilometres (3.4 mi) long.

=== Line guide ===
Grange Line's Adelaide–Woodville service
Name	Distance from Adelaide	Year opened	Serving suburbs	Connections
Adelaide	0.0 km	1856	Adelaide	Belair Flinders Gawler; Seaford Bus Tram
Bowden	2.4 km	1856	Bowden	
Croydon	4.2 km	1888	Croydon	
West Croydon	5.1 km	1915	West Croydon	
Kilkenny	6.0 km	1881	Kilkenny, Woodville Park	
Woodville Park	6.8 km	1936	Woodville, Woodville Park	
Woodville	7.5 km	1856	St Clair, Woodville	Outer Harbor Port Dock Bus
Grange Line
Albert Park	9.1 km	1882	Albert Park, Woodville West	Bus
Seaton Park	10.3 km	1882	Seaton	
East Grange	12.0 km	1882	Grange	
Grange	12.0 km	1882	Grange	Bus

== Services ==
All services have been operated by 3000 class railcars since 2014. Between Adelaide and Woodville, services operate in tandem with Outer Harbor line trains. Weekday peak services run every 20–30 minutes, weekday off-peak services every 30 minutes, and hourly on weekends.

The line goes diagonally across the golf links of the Royal Adelaide Golf Club. When the club hosted the South Australian Open, services were cut back to Seaton Park for about two weeks so as not to interrupt the golf competition. Rail replacement buses were used to transport passengers for the remainder of the route. The tournaments ended in 2007.

== Gallery ==
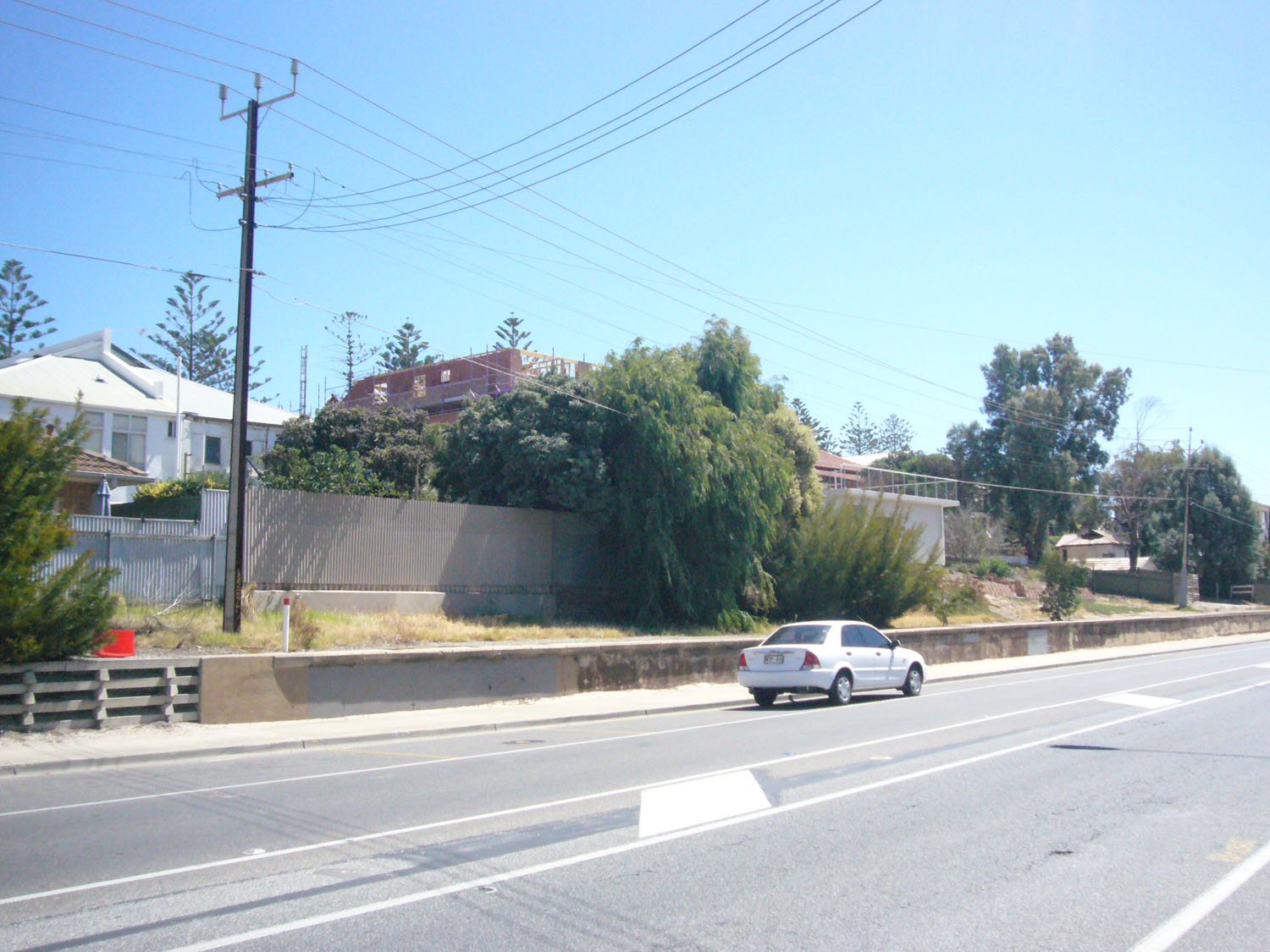
The old Grange station remnants in 2008. A fence has since been installed on the platform.

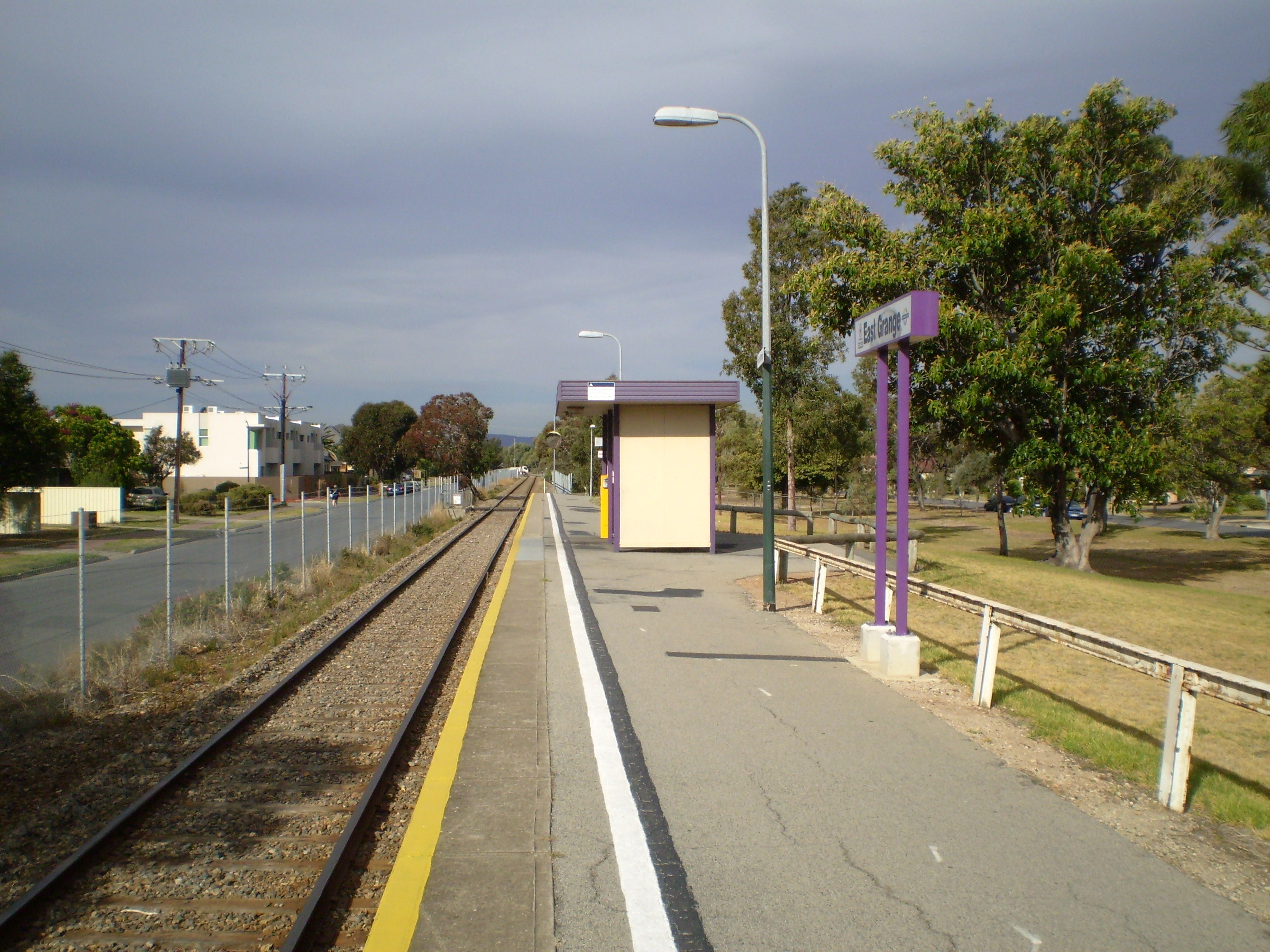
East Grange station

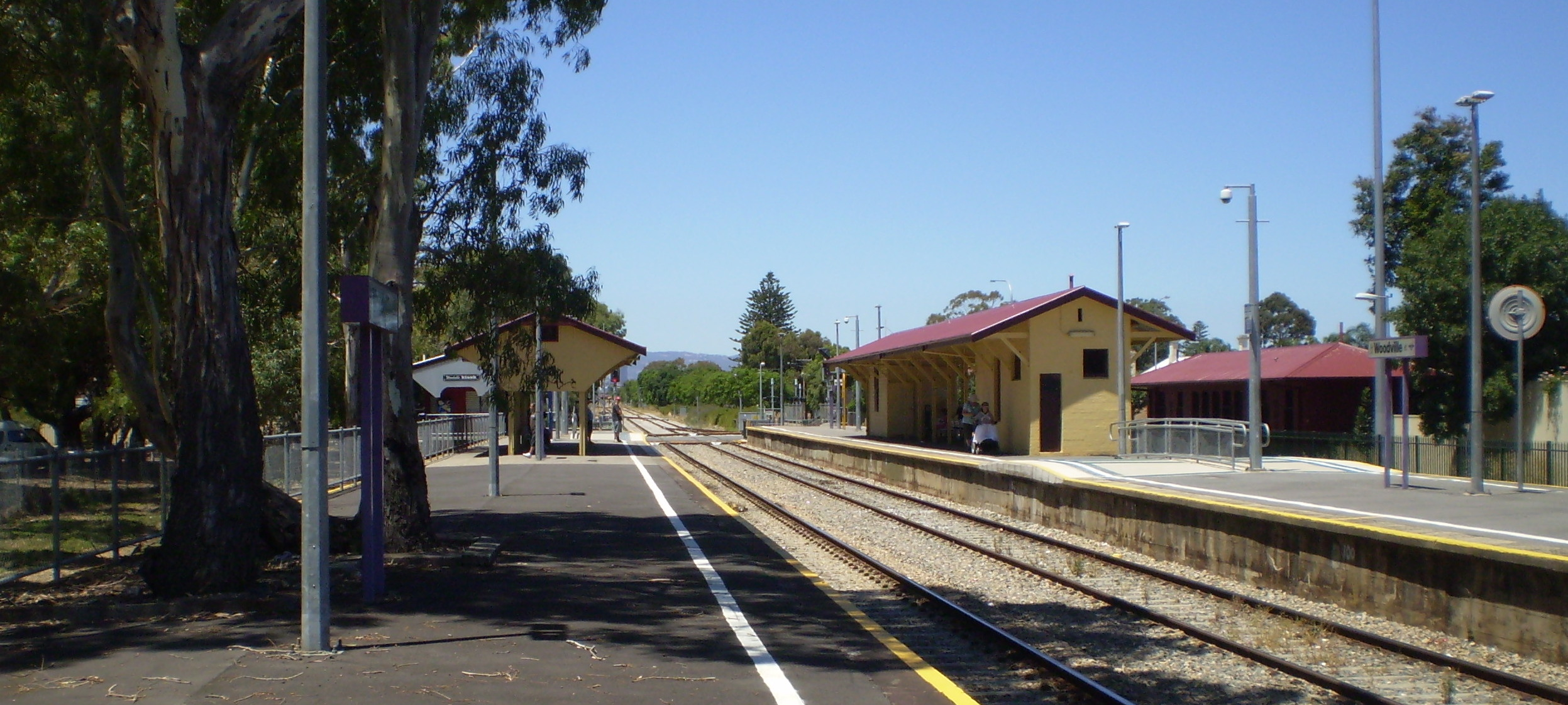
Woodville station
