= Woodville railway station, Adelaide =

Railway station in Adelaide, South Australia

Woodville
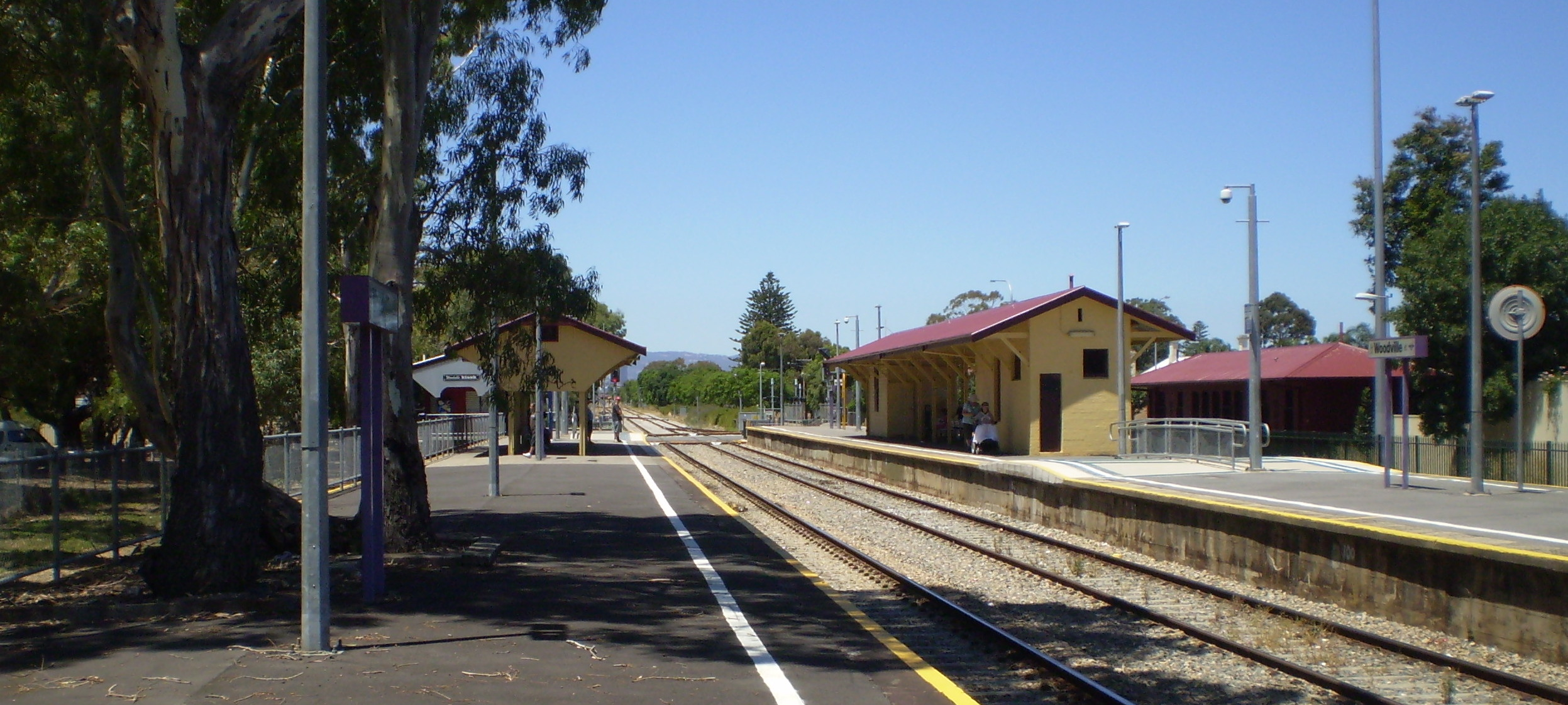
- View towards the south-east, towards Adelaide, from Platform 3, January 2008

General information
- Location: Woodville Road, Woodville
- Coordinates: 34°52′37″S 138°32′16″E
- Owner: Department for Infrastructure & Transport
- Operator: Adelaide Metro
- Line: Grange Outer Harbor Port Dock
- Distance: 7.5 km from Adelaide
- Platforms: 4 (1 disused)
- Tracks: 3
- Bus routes: 100, 300 (Woodville Road); 230, 232, J8 (Torrens Road); 150, 155, 157 (Port Road)
- Connections: Bus

Construction
- Structure type: Ground; 1 island platform 1 side platform
- Parking: Yes
- Cycle facilities: Yes
- Accessible: Yes

Other information
- Station code: 16571 (to City); 18452 (to Outer Harbor, Port Dock & Grange)
- Website: Adelaide Metro

History
- Opened: 1856

Services
Preceding station	Adelaide Metro	Following station
Woodville Park towards Adelaide	Grange line	Albert Park towards Grange
Woodville Park towards Adelaide	Outer Harbor line	St Clair towards Osborne or Outer Harbor
Adelaide Terminus	Outer Harbor line Express	St Clair towards Osborne or Outer Harbor
Woodville Park towards Adelaide	Port Dock line	St Clair towards Port Dock
Location

Woodville railway station, on Adelaide's Outer Harbor line, is a junction station for the Grange branch line. Situated in the western Adelaide suburb of Woodville, it is 7.5 kilometres (4.7 miles) from the Adelaide railway station.

== History ==
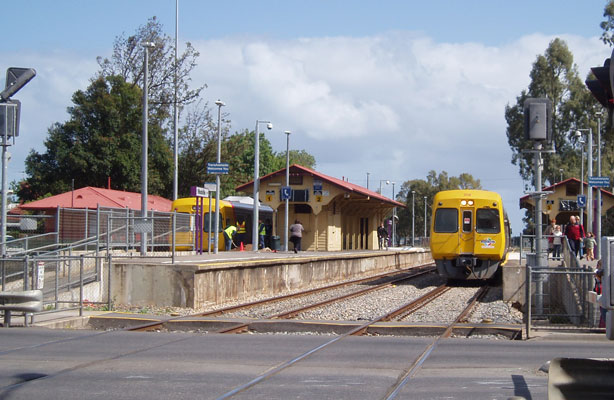
Northbound view in October 2005

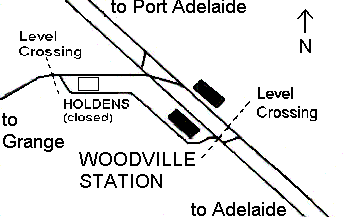
Track layout at Woodville station showing former Holdens station.

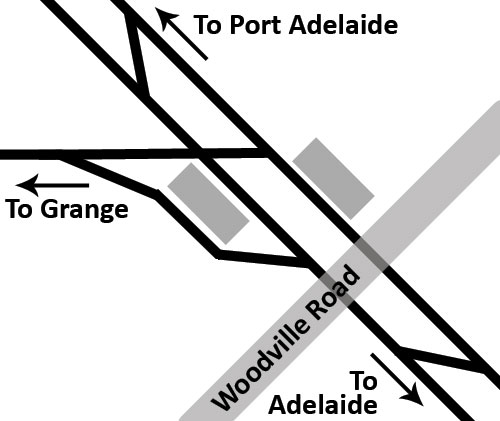
Track layout at Woodville station in 2005

Woodville station was one of the original stations on the Adelaide to Port Adelaide railway, which opened in April 1856. The only other intermediate stations on the new line were at Bowden and Alberton. In the early days, Adelaide to Port Adelaide was a single-track railway and a passing loop was provided at Woodville. As traffic on the line increased, the single track was duplicated throughout in 1881.

The 1920s and 1930s saw significant development of heavy industry in Woodville and the neighbouring areas. Holdens Motor Body Builders (later General Motors Holden) built a factory in the fork between the Grange line (at that stage the Henley Beach railway line) and the Outer Harbor line. Sidings were laid to service the factory and Holdens station was opened in 1928 about 500 metres (550 yards) along the Grange line. Motor cars were dispatched by rail from Holdens' sidings.

The Woodville signal cabin became obsolete after a resignalling project in the late 1980s and has been relocated to the National Railway Museum, Port Adelaide. In late 2016, the station was ranked as one of the best stations in the western suburbs based on 5 criteria.

=== Branch to Grange and Henley Beach ===
The railway line between Woodville and Grange opened in September 1882. It was a private railway built, mainly for passenger traffic, by the Grange Railway and Investment Company as part of a land development project. In 1894, with the railway continuing to be unprofitable, the South Australian Railways acquired it and extended it 2.2 kilometres (1.4 miles) southwards to Henley Beach railway station in response to community pressure.

=== Branch lines ===
In World War II several munitions and armaments factories were opened, which resulted in construction of two new industrial branch lines in the Woodville area. The Finsbury line was opened in September 1940 and departed from the main line at Woodville. It headed in a northerly direction and serviced a wartime munitions works at Cheltenham Park and a Government Supply Depot at Finsbury. The line continued through Pennington to join the Dry Creek-Port Adelaide railway at Gillman Junction. The layout at Woodville station was altered in 1942 when a new platform face was constructed on the north-east side of today's Platform 3 to serve Finsbury trains. The original 1856 station building on the Port Adelaide-bound platform was demolished and a new signal cabin was provided adjacent to the Woodville Road level crossing.

As an industrial spur, the Finsbury line had limited passenger services, mainly to cater for workers at factories in the vicinity. After the end of World War II there were no off-peak trains, or weekend services after Saturday lunchtime. The Finsbury line closed on 17 August 1979 and later dismantled and redeveloped. The Islamic Arabic Centre & Al-Khalil Mosque on Torrens Road, Woodville North stands where the extensive Woodville North station platform used to stand until the 1980s.

== Services by platform ==
For many years, the Grange line was operated by a shuttle service train at weekends and in the evenings. This terminated at Platform 1 and made connections with Outer Harbor line trains to and from Adelaide. However, since about 1996, all Grange trains have operated through to Adelaide.

Platform	Lines	Destinations	Notes
1	Grange	All stops services to Grange	
2	Outer Harbor	All stops services to Outer Harbor	Some peak hour services terminate at Osborne; Most trains bound for Outer Harbor do not stop at Cheltenham
2	Port Dock	All stops services to Port Dock	
3	Grange	All stops services to Adelaide	
3	Outer Harbor	All stops services to Adelaide	Most services run express from Woodville to Adelaide
3	Port Dock	All stops services to Adelaide	

== Transport links ==
Bus transfers: Stop 222 (Woodville Road)
Route no.	Destination & route details
100	Glen Osmond
101	Flinders University
300	Circle Line

Bus transfers: Stop 21 (Port Road)
Route no.	Destination & route details
J7	Adelaide Airport via Findon Road
150	Osborne via Port Road
155	West Lakes via West Lakes Boulevard
157	Largs Bay via West Lakes
