= Grange railway station =

Railway station in Adelaide, South Australia

Grange
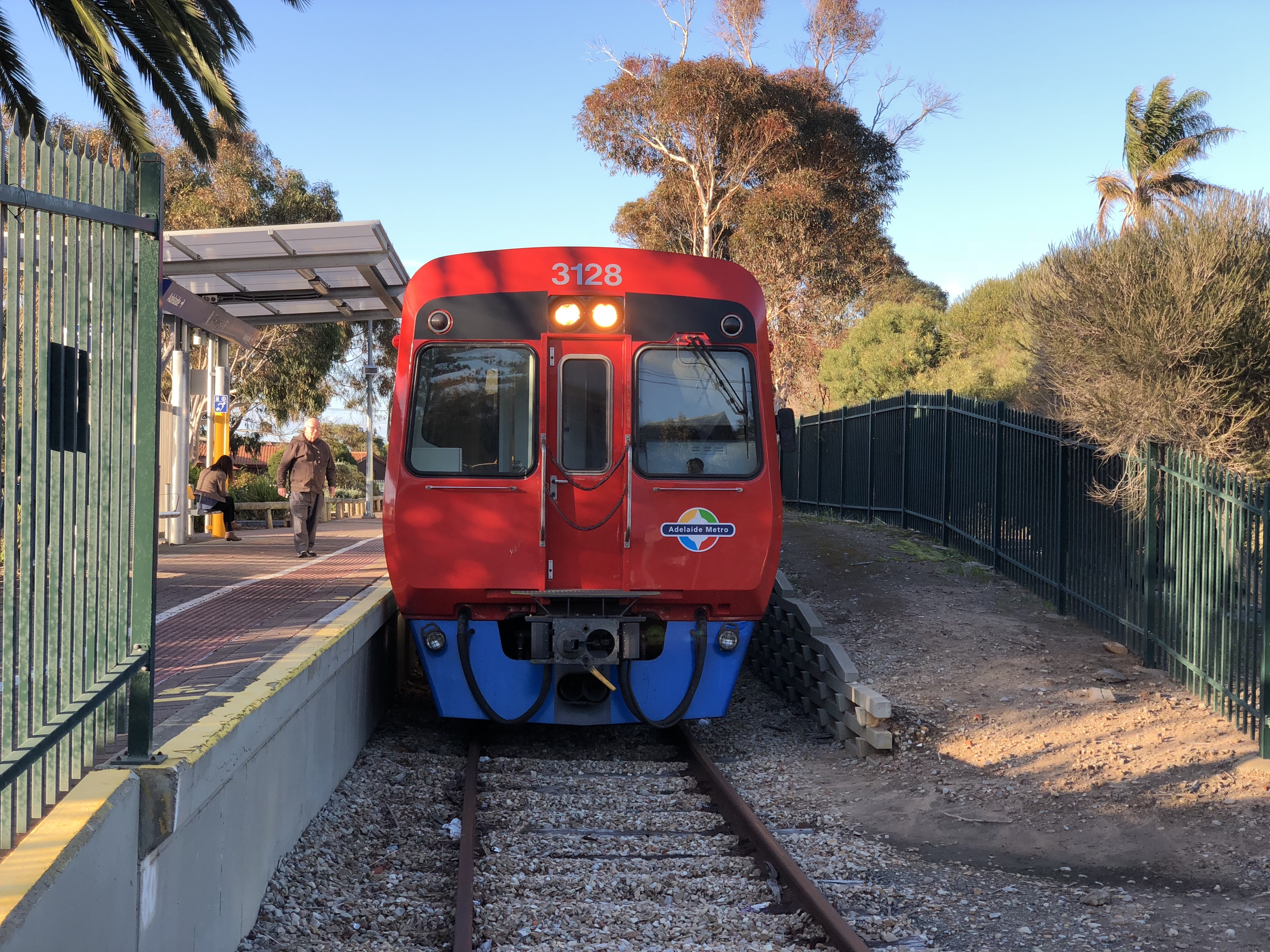
- 3000 class railcar (mid-refurb) at Grange station

General information
- Location: Terminus Street, Grange
- Coordinates: 34°54′01″S 138°29′27″E
- Owner: Department for Infrastructure & Transport
- Operator: Adelaide Metro
- Line: Grange
- Distance: 13 km from Adelaide
- Platforms: 1
- Tracks: 1
- Bus routes: H30
- Connections: Bus

Construction
- Structure type: Ground, side platform
- Parking: Yes
- Cycle facilities: Yes
- Accessible: Yes

Other information
- Station code: 16523 (to City)
- Website: Adelaide Metro

History
- Opened: 1882
- Rebuilt: 1986

Services
Preceding station	Adelaide Metro	Following station
East Grange towards Adelaide	Grange line	Terminus
Location

Grange railway station is the terminus station of the Grange line. Situated in the western Adelaide suburb of Grange, it is 13 kilometres from Adelaide station.

== History ==
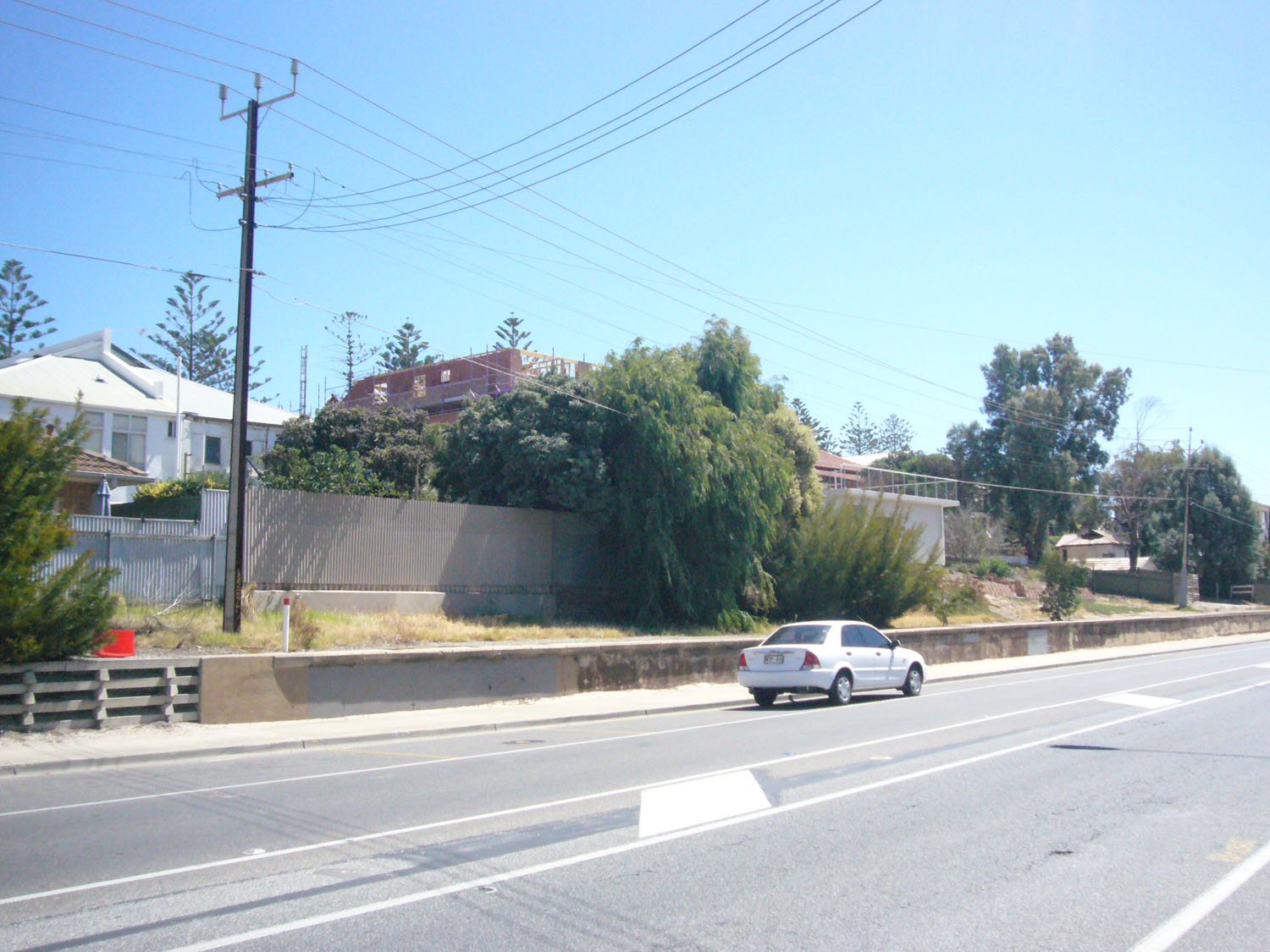
Original station platform remnants, 2008.

The original station, located 13.2 kilometres from Adelaide and on the western side of Military Road, was opened in September 1882 as the terminus of the Grange railway line. Initially operated by a private company, South Australian Railways took over the line in the 1890s, and extended it to Henley Beach station via the Henley Beach railway line. On 31 August 1957, however, the line was cut back to Grange.

On 9 March 1986, the current Grange station, on the eastern side of Military Road replaced the original station on the western side. The station was relocated to prevent traffic flow along Military Road from being interrupted by the arrival of trains. The ticket office and shelter of the original station were demolished shortly after, but the unused platform remains in place.

The station passenger shelter was replaced in 2017.

On 22 November 2022, a train derailed at the station by overshooting into the buffers. Nobody on the train was injured, and services resumed on the following day with trains terminating at the east end of the platform. The west end was subsequently fenced off.

== Services by platform ==
Platform	Lines	Destinations	Notes
1	Grange	All stops services to Adelaide	Terminus

== Transport links ==
Bus transfers: Stop 30A (Military Road)
Route no.	Destination & route details
136	City to Port Adelaide via Henley Beach Road, Westfield West Lakes & Frederick Road
137	City to Westfield West Lakes via Henley Beach Road & Turner Drive
139	City to Westfield West Lakes via Henley Beach Road, Military Road & West Lakes Boulevard
