= Kirkcaldy, Alberta =

Kirkcaldy
- Hamlet
- Location of Kirkcaldy Kirkcaldy (Canada)
- Coordinates: 50°20′06″N 113°14′16″W
- Country: Canada
- Province: Alberta
- Region: Southern Alberta
- Census division: 5
- Municipal district: Vulcan County

Government
  - Type: Unincorporated
  - Governing body: Vulcan County Council

Population (2007)
  - Total: 12
- Time zone: UTC−06:00 (Alberta Time)
- Area codes: 403, 587, 825

Kirkcaldy (/kərˈkɔːdi/) is a hamlet in southern Alberta, Canada within Vulcan County. It is located 0.3 km (0.19 mi) west of Highway 23, approximately 98 km (61 mi) southeast of Calgary.

== Etymology ==
According to the Government of Alberta, it is likely that Kirkcaldy was named after the Scottish town of Kirkcaldy. The settlement was founded in 1911 when the Canadian Pacific Railway (CPR) established a stop. At the time, a significant number of Scots worked for the CPR, and they commonly bestowed Scottish names upon new outposts in Canada.

== History ==
Kirkcaldy was founded in 1911 when the Canadian Pacific Railway established a stop in the area.

On January 15, 1915, Wallace E. McKenzie opened a general store that also contained a post office, serving as both postmaster and store owner. The presence of a railroad allowed for mail to be received in, and directly delivered from, Calgary. One notable postmaster in the years that followed was Lorena Mallory, wife of Grant Mallory, who ran the operation between December 1920 and July 1924. The operation closed in February 1970.

=== Military presence during the Second World War ===
During the Second World War, the Royal Canadian Air Force (RCAF) participated in the British Commonwealth Air Training project to train military aircrew. In 1942, the RCAF established RCAF Station Vulcan, which was geographically closer to Kirkcaldy than the town of Vulcan.

After the war ended in 1945, the site remained in use by the RCAF as a depot for cutting military aircraft down to scrap until the late 1950s. It briefly operated as an airport but lay mostly abandoned until 2011, when it was reopened as the Vulcan/Kirkcaldy Aerodrome.

=== Connection to the Ware family ===
Two daughters of pioneering ranchers Mildred and John Ware, Mildred Jr. and Janet Amanda "Nettie," moved to Kirkcaldy in 1921 to run a farm with their grandmother and uncle. They stayed in Kirkcaldy until relocating to Vulcan in 1960, though the sisters remained involved in Kirkcaldy's social events for the rest of their lives.

The sisters maintained a long friendship with Don Mallory, Kirkcaldy resident and descendant of Lorena and Grant Mallory, who had operated the post office in the 1920s. Mallory was also an amateur historian, and the sisters entrusted their family archives to him. In the early 2000s, journalist Cheryl Foggo worked with Don to research the Ware family for her 2020 documentary, John Ware Reclaimed. Some of the documentary was filmed in Kirkcaldy.

== Demographics ==
The Calgary Herald reported that Kirkcaldy had a population of 20 as of 1986. In 2007, as recorded by Vulcan County's municipal census in 2007, Kirkcaldy's population stood at 12. Vulcan County Council identified Kirkcaldy as containing 14 residential properties in 2017.

== Governance ==
Kirkcaldy falls within the municipal district of Vulcan County.

=== Water ===
Prior to 2017, Kirkcaldy residents did not have access to the municipal water supply network. In April 2017, Vulcan County Council greenlit funding to connect a total of 14 properties to a water line running from Vulcan to Carmangay.

=== Connectivity ===
In July 2023, the Government of Alberta and Government of Canada announced joint funding to implement high-speed internet access for a selection of rural and remote communities, including Kirkcaldy.

== Economy ==
Kirkcaldy's proximity to Vulcan, which flourished quickly into a town, hampered Kirkcaldy's commercial development early on in its existence. Aside from the combined store and post office, the longest-running businesses were several grain elevators and the railroad's section depot. Between 1911 and 1980, other businesses that operated in Kirkcaldy included a lumber yard, boarding house, pool room and dairy barn.

== See also ==
- List of communities in Alberta
- List of hamlets in Alberta
