= Kirkcaldy (disambiguation) =

Kirkcaldy is a town in Fife, Scotland. Kirkcaldy may also refer to:

- Kirkcaldy, Alberta, a hamlet in Alberta, Canada
- Vulcan/Kirkcaldy Aerodrome, an aerodrome in Alberta, Canada
- Kirkcaldy Beach, largely forgotten term for part of Grange, South Australia

== Entities associated with the town in Fife ==
- Kirkcaldy (district), local government district, 1975 to 1996
- Kirkcaldy (Parliament of Scotland constituency), prior to 1707
- Kirkcaldy (UK Parliament constituency), constituency, 1974 to 2005
- Kirkcaldy (Scottish Parliament constituency), established 1999
- Kirkcaldy railway station, railway station
- Kirkcaldy RFC, rugby union club established 1873
- Kirkcaldy United F.C., association football club established 1901
- Kirkcaldy YM F.C., association football club established 1969

== Geographical features ==
- Kirkcaldy railway station, Adelaide, a former railway station on the Henley Beach railway line

== People with name Kirkcaldy ==
- Sir James Kirkcaldy of Grange (died 1556), a Fife laird and treasurer of Scotland
- Sir William Kirkcaldy of Grange (1520–1573), a Scottish politician and soldier, son of James
- Henry Dalziel, 1st Baron Dalziel of Kirkcaldy (1868–1935), only holder of the title
- George Willis Kirkaldy, zoologist

== See also ==
- Kirkaldy Spur, landform in East Antarctica
- Kirkaldy (surname), easily confused spelling
