= Fred Whitfield (rodeo cowboy) =

American tie-down roper

Fred Whitfield (born August 5, 1967) is an American former professional rodeo cowboy who specialized in tie-down roping. He won eight Professional Rodeo Cowboys Association (PRCA) world championships and three National Finals Rodeo (NFR) aggregate titles. Seven of those titles were tie-down roping world championships and one was the all-around world championship. He is one of a few African-American professional rodeo cowboys and by far the most successful. He was inducted into the ProRodeo Hall of Fame in 2004.

== Early life ==
Fred Whitfield was born in Hockley, Texas, on August 5, 1967, to Willie and Marie Whitfield. He was raised in Cypress, Texas, just north of Houston, in a violent, extremely poor home. His mother bore five children, but two were placed for adoption because she could not afford to take care of them. Whitfield was raised with a brother and a younger sister. Their father was an alcoholic who regularly abused their mother. Twice, she shot him after he beat her. In the mid-1970s, Willie Whitfield was sent to prison for killing a man in a dispute over a woman. The younger Whitfield was relieved that his father was no longer in the house.

Marie Whitfield supported the family by cleaning the house of their white neighbors, Don and Joanne Moffitt. Their son Roy was seven years older than Whitfield. Despite the age difference, Roy Moffitt took Whitfield under his wing. When Whitfield was six, Moffitt taught him to rope. They often practiced on dogs, chickens, cats, and, occasionally, Whitfield's younger sister. The Moffitt family allowed Whitfield to use their horses and equipment to compete in youth rodeos, and often paid his entry fees. Whitfield specialized in tie-down roping. In this event, a 190–270-pound (86–122 kg) calf is released from a chute. After a short head start, a cowboy on horseback lassos the calf. The cowboy then dismounts, throws the calf to the ground, and ties any three of the calf's legs together. The competitor with the fastest time wins.

As a teenager, Whitfield worked as a horse-trainer for a local rancher and competed in amateur rodeos, including the Bill Pickett Invitational Rodeos (a rodeo circuit intended for African-American competitors). He graduated from high school in 1986.

== Rodeo career ==
Whitfield joined the Professional Rodeo Cowboys Association (PRCA) in 1990. This allowed him to compete in PRCA-sanctioned rodeos. His early years were difficult. The PRCA membership was overwhelmingly white; fewer than 5% of competitors were black. Cowboys were expected to provide their own equipment and have access to livestock. Few black men had those resources, limiting their ability to break into the sport. His peers - and the crowds - were not always receptive to the idea of a black cowboy. Others were disgusted that Whitfield often dated white women. Crowds sometimes yelled racist remarks when he competed. Some white cowboys tried to incite him to fight. He said that the disapproval "just fuels me. Any chance I get to kick their a– in competition, I'm going to do it."

Professional cowboys earn money when they are among the top finishers at a rodeo event. In many cases, a win will earn them no more than $1,000. Each dollar of prize money earned at PRCA-sanctioned events is counted towards qualification in the annual National Finals Rodeo (NFR). In his rookie year, Whitfield was one of the top-15 highest earners in calf roping, making him the second first-year competitor to ever qualify for the NFR. Whitfield won the NFR in 1991 in tie-down roping. He was the second black man to win an NFR title, and first to win a timed event title.

In 1989, Whitfield was jailed overnight for brawling with a black man at a bar near a Bill Pickett rodeo in California. His opponent sliced him across the left cheek; the cut required over 30 stitches to close. Whitfield responded by beating the man with a tire iron.

In 1996, Whitfield brawled with three white bull riders. When they taunted him with their supposed connections to organized crime, Whitfield hired bodyguards. They accompanied him to the NFR, where he again won the world championship.

The following year, Whitfield set an aggregate record in the NFR. He scored a combined 84 points in the ten rounds. In the ninth round, Whitfield became the second of three men to break the single-run world record. Blair Burk's run lasted only 7 seconds, beating the previous 7.1 second record. Whitfield competed minutes later and finished in 6.9 seconds. His record lasted only another few minutes, before Jeff Chapman finished a tenth of a second faster.

Whitfield won the all-around world championship in 1999.

He won the Houston Livestock Show and Rodeo for the first time in 2000. In conjunction with the 2002 Winter Olympics in Salt Lake City, Utah, a three-day Olympic Command Performance Rodeo was hosted to showcase Western culture. Both the United States and Canada brought five competitors in each event. The winners would receive both prize money and medals. Whitfield was one of the United States representatives.

In 2004, he was inducted into the ProRodeo Hall of Fame.

Whitfield won his eighth world championship in 2005 in tie-down roping.

Whitfield won the Calgary Stampede in 2007. After suffering an injury during the 2007 season, Whitfield missed making the NFR for the first time in his career. He did not qualify for the NFR in 2009 and 2011.

A young black Texas cowboy, Cory Solomon, joined the PRCA as a tie-down roper in 2009. Whitfield soon became Solomon's mentor.

In 2011, Whitfield won the year-end tie-down roping championship for the semi-professional Cowboys Professional Rodeo Association (CPRA).

As of 2013, Whitfield had earned more prize money in calf roping than any previous competitor. In July 2012, his combined earnings surpassed $3 million.

Whitfield began cutting down on his touring schedule, preferring to spend more time at home, where he trained other athletes. Through June 2015, he had competed in only 25 rodeos, winning about $10,000. Although he was not high in the PRCA standings, his reputation was enough to get him invited to some of the major non-PRCA rodeos, including the Calgary Stampede. There, he doubled his yearly earnings.

In 2015, a group of elite cowboys including Whitfield, disenchanted with the PRCA, formed the Elite Rodeo Athletes (ERA). This for-profit organization was collectively owned by its competitors. They planned to compete against each other at several rodeos around the country, culminating in a world championship at the end of their season. The PRCA promptly changed their bylaws to ban cowboys with financial interest in any other rodeo association, beginning with the 2016 season. ERA members would be disqualified from all PRCA rodeos, including the NFR. ERA shareholders could still compete at non-PRCA-sanctioned rodeos.

At the 2016 Calgary Stampede, Whitfield finished in second place, earning $25,000.

After the ERA shut down after its only competitive season, Whitfield did not to return to PRCA competition, and instead competed primarily in the semi-professional Cowboys Professional Rodeo Association (CPRA).

Whitfield was invited to compete at the 2019 Houston Livestock Show and Rodeo, which had once again become a PRCA rodeo after eight years of being unsanctioned. After his performances there, Whitfield officially retired from rodeo competition.

== Honors ==
- 2000 Rodeo Hall of Fame of the National Cowboy & Western Heritage Museum
- 2003 Texas Cowboy Hall of Fame
- 2004 ProRodeo Hall of Fame
- 2005 Cheyenne Frontier Days Hall of Fame
- 2005 Texas Rodeo Cowboy Hall of Fame
- 2012 National Multicultural Western Heritage Museum and Hall of Fame
- 2012 St. Paul Rodeo Hall of Fame
- 2026 All Cowboy & Arena Champions Hall of Fame

== Other ==
Whitfield married Cassie, in 2000. They have two daughters.

The Whitfields purchased a ranch in Hockley, Texas, near Houston, where Fred trained and sold horses for several years. Just before retiring from rodeo, he sold the ranch and his horses, and took a job in sales for a gas and oil company. He and his family now reside in Magnolia, Texas.

In 2013, Whitfield published his autobiography, Gold Buckles Don't Lie, written in conjunction with Terri Powers.

Whitfield portrayed the legendary black Albertan cowboy and rancher John Ware for dramatic sequences in the documentary John Ware Reclaimed. The film was released in 2020.
