= Kirkaldy (surname) =

Kirkaldy is a common misspelling of the Scottish town Kirkcaldy. It is also a surname of Scottish origin. Notable people with the surname include:

- Andrew Kirkaldy (golfer) (1860–1934), Scottish golfer
- Andrew Kirkaldy (racing driver) (born 1976), Scottish racing driver
- David Kirkaldy (1820–1897), Scottish engineer
- George Willis Kirkaldy (1873–1910), English entomologist
- Hugh Kirkaldy (1868–1897), Scottish golfer
- Irene Morgan Kirkaldy (1917–2007), also known as Irene Morgan, African-American civil rights activist
- Sir James Kirkcaldy of Grange (died 1556), treasurer of Scotland (also spelled Kirkcaldy)
- Jane Kirkaldy (1869–1932), contributed greatly to the education of the generation of English women scientists
- Sir William Kirkcaldy of Grange (c.1520 – 1573), Scottish politician and soldier (also spelled Kirkcaldy)

== See also ==
- Kirkcaldy (disambiguation)
