= Kirkcaldy railway station, Adelaide =

Former railway station in South Australia, Australia

Coordinates: 34°54′29″S 138°29′31″E

Kirkcaldy
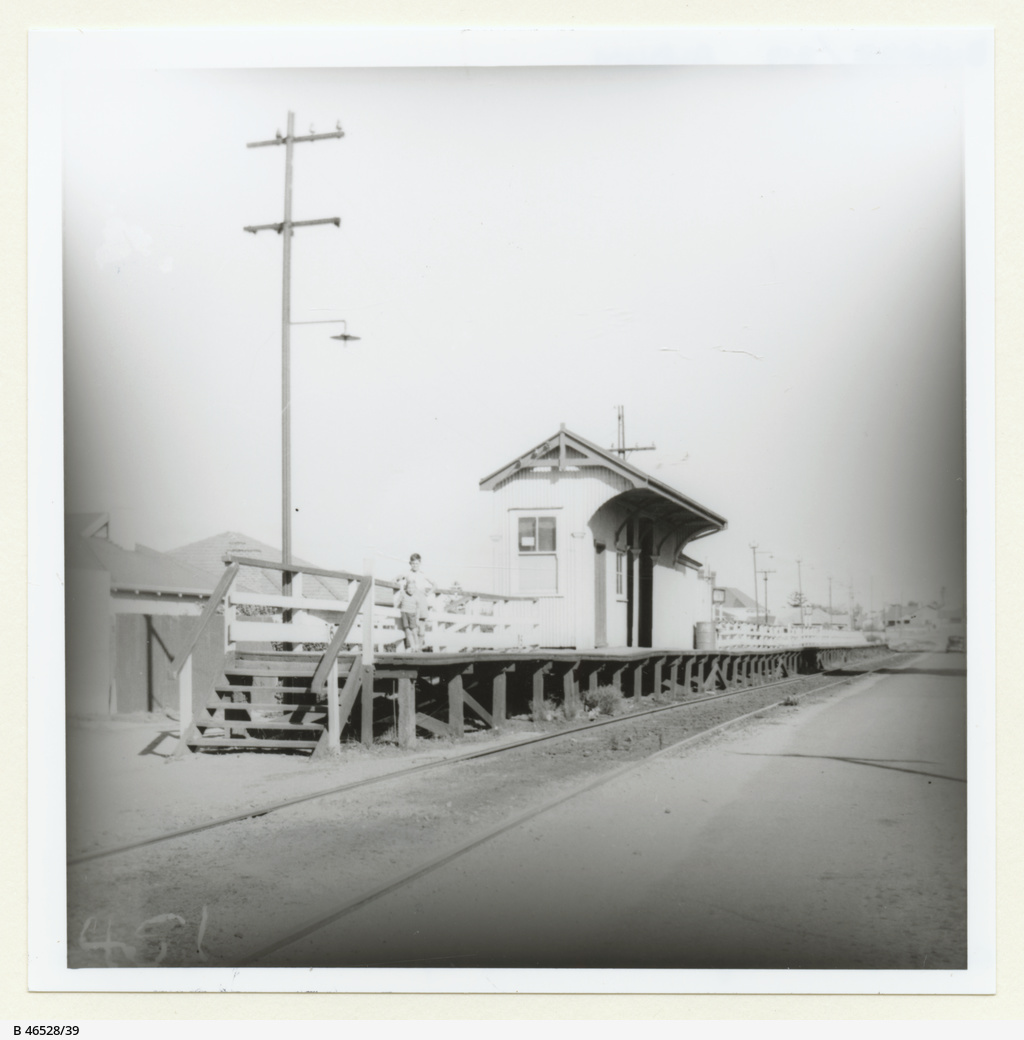
- Kirkcaldy railway station c1935

General information
- Location: Military Road and Grange Road; Henley Beach
- Line: Henley Beach Line

History
- Opened: 1894
- Closed: 31 August 1957

Services
Preceding station	Adelaide Metro	Following station
Grange towards Old Grange	Henley Beach line (closed)	Marlborough Street towards Henley Beach
Location

Kirkcaldy railway station is a former railway station in the western Adelaide suburb of Henley Beach.

== History ==
The station opened in 1894 on the former Henley Beach railway line and was located on Military Road, immediately south of Grange Road. Facilities consisted of a single platform and a shelter shed.

It was closed on 31 August 1957 due to safety concerns about Military Road and the railway line being close together. The station has since been demolished.

== See also ==
- List of closed Adelaide railway stations
