= Marlborough Street railway station =

Former railway station in South Australia, Australia

Marlborough Street

General information
- Location: Military Road and Marlborough Street; Henley Beach
- Line: Henley Beach Line

History
- Opened: 1894
- Closed: 31 August 1957

Services
Preceding station	Adelaide Metro	Following station
Kirkcaldy towards Old Grange	Henley Beach line (closed)	Henley Beach Terminus
Location

Marlborough Street railway station is a former railway station in the western Adelaide suburb of Henley Beach.

== History ==
The station opened in 1894, and was on the former Henley Beach railway. Facilities consisted of a single platform and probably a shelter shed.

It closed on 31 August 1957, and the station has since been demolished.

== See also ==
- List of closed Adelaide railway stations
