= Henley Beach railway line =

Former railway line in Adelaide, South Australia

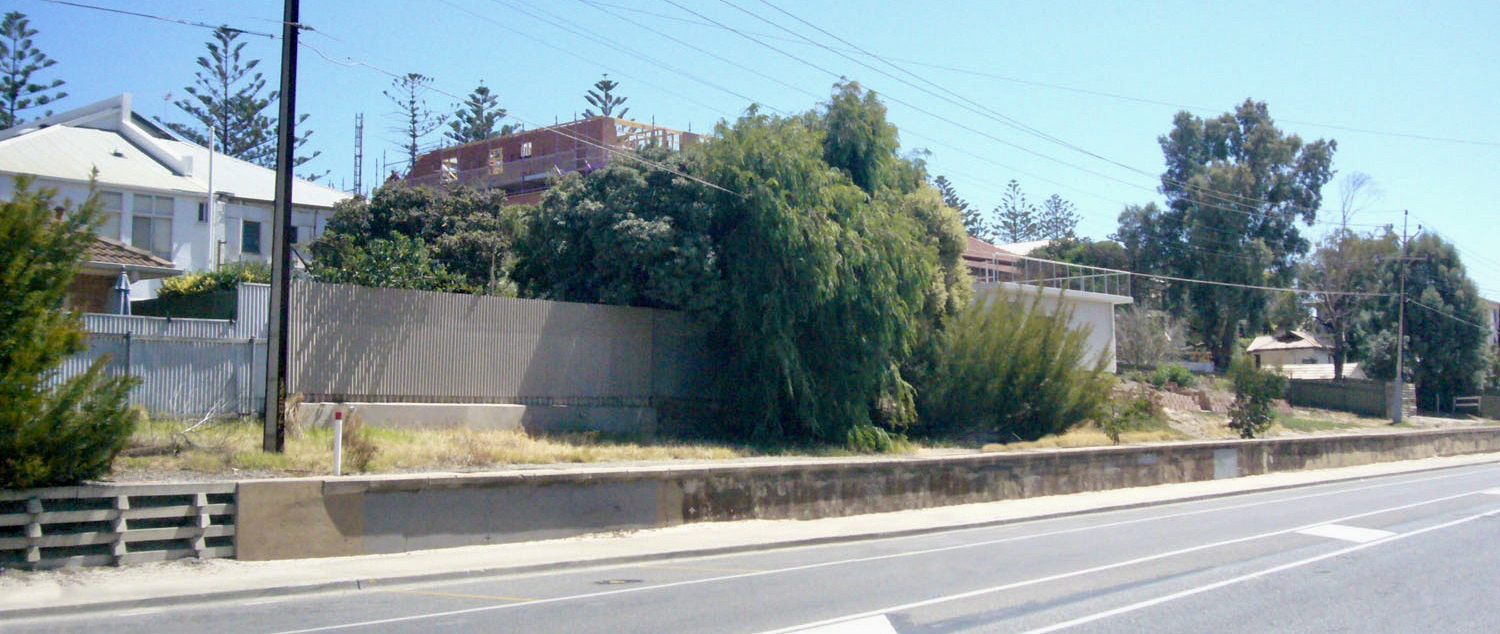
- The platform facing of the old Grange station on Military Road now serves as a retaining wall

Overview
- Status: Closed and removed between Henley Beach station and (old) Grange station; resultant line re-named Grange railway line
- Locale: Adelaide, South Australia
- Termini: Woodville; Henley Beach

History
- Opened: 1882 to Grange, 1894 to Henley Beach
- Closed: 1957 Henley Beach to Grange (old)

Technical
- Line length: 7.8 km (4.8 mi)
- Number of tracks: Single track

The Henley Beach railway line was a single-track branch line, 7.8 kilometres (4.8 miles) long, that ran through several coastal suburbs of Adelaide, the capital city of South Australia. It commenced at Woodville railway station, 7.5 kilometres (4.7 miles) from Adelaide railway station on the Outer Harbor railway line.

The inaugural line, opened in 1882 by a land development company, went as far as Grange. Twelve years later, it was acquired by the government-owned South Australian Railways, which extended it 2.2 kilometres (1.4 miles) to Henley Beach. Some industrial spur lines were built in the first half of the 20th century near its northern end. The Henley Beach–Grange section was closed in 1957; the resulting line, after being upgraded, was named the Grange railway line.

== History ==
The line as far as Grange was opened in 1882 as a private railway, mainly for passenger traffic, by the Grange Railway and Investment Company as part of a land development project. In 1891, with the railway continuing to be unprofitable, the South Australian Railways (SAR) took over its operation, before acquiring it in 1894. At the same time the SAR extended it 2.2 kilometres (1.4 miles) southwards to Henley Beach railway station in response to community pressure. It was re-named the Henley Beach railway line.

The line originally had five stations: Grange, Kirkcaldy, Marlborough Street, Henley Beach Jetty Road, and Henley Beach. At some stage between 1913 and 1940, the Henley Beach terminus station was closed and the Henley Beach Jetty Road station became the terminus, renamed as Henley Beach.

The line between Grange and Henley Beach stations, which shared the corridor with Military Road without protective fencing, was closed to traffic on 1 September 1957 and subsequently removed.

The Grange station platform and waiting shed were retained as the southern terminus of the line on the western side of Military Road. In 1986, however, the track was foreshortened by 150 metres (160 yards), removing it from Military Road. A new platform and shelter was built for the Grange railway station. The railway corridor was also refurbished, including by laying concrete sleepers. The concrete platform wall of the old station was retained on the side of Military Road as a retaining wall. At this time, the name of the line reverted to its namesake of 73 years beforehand, the Grange railway line.

== Line guide ==
Station	Image	Opened	Additional information
Henley Beach		1894	Southern terminus of Grange line from 1894; closed 31 August 1957
Marlborough Street		1894	Closed 31 August 1957
Kirkcaldy		1894	Closed 31 August 1957
Grange		1882	Active 1882 to 1894 and since September 1957; building demolished 1986
