= Cheryl Foggo =

Canadian journalist

Cheryl Foggo AOE
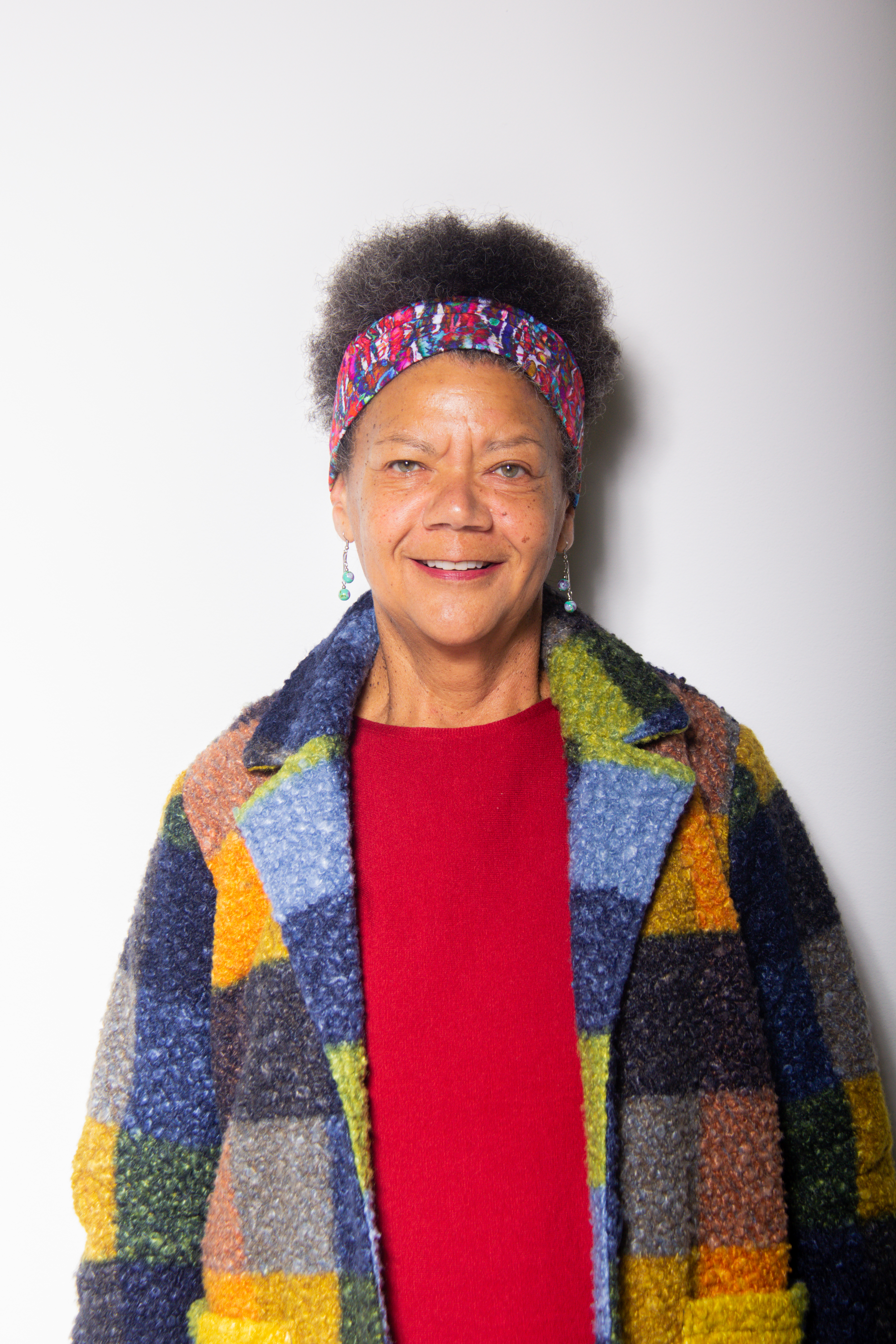
- Born: 1956 (age 69–70); Calgary, Alberta, Canada
- Occupations: Author; journalist; director; playwright; screenwriter
- Writing career
- Language: English
- Genres: Bildungsroman; realistic fiction; memoir

Cheryl Dawn Foggo is a Canadian author, documentary film director, screenwriter and playwright.

== Early and personal life ==
Born in Calgary, Alberta, in 1956, she is descended from Black Oklahomans who settled in Maidstone, Saskatchewan, in 1910. She also had ancestors who lived in Amber Valley and Campsie, Alberta. Foggo's mother's was close friends with Violet King Henry, the first Black woman lawyer in Canada.

== Advocacy ==
Her work focuses on Western Canadians of African descent. She is an advocate for writers and Black artists and is an active mentor and lecturer.

Foggo served on the advisory board for Black on the Prairies, a multi-platform archive and resource on CBC initiated and curated by journalist Omayra Issa and radio host Ify Chiwetelu. She has also had multiple presentations of her multi-media creations: Ranchers, Rebels and the Righteous, Creole, Travelling On, Five Voices and Unlocking Sacred Codes.

She has been profiled in Who's Who in Black Canada.

== Journalism ==
Foggo has written for Theatre Alberta, Reader's Digest Canada, Avenue, Alberta Views, Alberta Ventures, Calgary, Western Living, Sunday Magazine, Arts Bridge, Muse, Canadian Consumer, Calgary Herald, The Globe and Mail, and Legacy.

Her work has been anthologized in multiple collections, including The Black Prairie Archives: An Anthology, edited by Karina Vernon; Calgary Through the Eyes of Writers, edited by Shaun Hunter; Alberta Encore: People, Places, and Poetry from Legacy Magazine, edited by Barbara Dacks; One Step over the Line: Toward a History of Women in the North American Wests, edited by Elizabeth Jameson and Sheila McManus; Remembering Chinook Country; and Unsettled Pasts: Reconceiving the West Through Women's History, edited by Sarah Carter, Lesley Erickson, Patricia Roome, and Char Smith.

== Plays ==
Her play Turnaround, co-written with Clem Martini, was produced by Lunchbox Theatre Company in 1999.

Heaven was first produced by Lunchbox Theatre Company in 2001, which revived it in 2022. It also aired on CBC Radio's Sunday Showcase and Monday Night Playhouse in 2004.

In 2010, she created a stage adaptation of Chinua Achebe's Things Fall Apart, which received workshops and staged readings during Theatre Calgary's Fuse Festival and Afrikadey.

In August 2012, The Devil We Know, her play co-written with her husband Clem Martini, premiered at the Blyth Festival.

She began work on the play John Ware Reimagined hoping to bring attention to the Black Albertan cowboy and rancher John Ware in time for the centennial of the Calgary Stampede in 2012. An early version of the play had its first public reading in 2012. In August 2014, the play premiered in Calgary, produced by Ellipsis Tree Collective Theatre Company. The script won the Writers Guild of Alberta 2015 Gwen Pharis Ringwood Award for Drama. John Ware Reimagined had its second production at Workshop West Theatre Company in 2017.

Her play Heaven was produced at the Citadel Theatre in summer 2021.

Her short play The Sender was commissioned as part of Obsidian Theatre's 21 Black Futures, distributed on CBC Gem in 2021.

== Books ==
Her first book Pourin’ Down Rain: A Black Woman Claims Her Place in the Canadian West is a memoir about five generations of her family and talks about growing up Black on the Canadian Prairies. It was a finalist for the Alberta Culture Non-fiction Award in 1990. In 2020, Brush Education released the 30th anniversary edition. The audio version of the 30th anniversary edition is read by actor Karen Robinson.

Her three children's/young adult books – One Thing That's True (1998), I Have Been in Danger (2001), and Dear Baobab (2011) – offer positive representations of Black and mixed-race childhoods.

== Filmmaking ==
She was a consultant on several other films and was a member of the story team on the CBC drama North of 60 for two seasons.

In 2002, she wrote and directed the NFB documentary film The Journey of Lesra Martin, about lawyer Lesra Martin.

In 2019, she wrote and directed the short film Kicking Up a Fuss: The Charles Daniels Story, about civil rights activist Charles Daniels, which was a finalist for a Rosie Award in 2020.

Foggo made John Ware Reclaimed, a documentary film about Black cowboy John Ware, with the National Film Board of Canada (NFB). John Ware Reclaimed had its world premiere at the Calgary International Film Festival in 2020, where it received the CTV Alberta Feature Audience Choice Award.

== Filmography ==
Years	Title	Role	Ref.
1992	Carol's Mirror	Screenwriter	
1997–1998	North of 60	Screenwriter	
2002	The Journey of Lesra Martin	Screenwriter Director	
2019	Kicking Up a Fuss: The Charles Daniels Story	Screenwriter Director	
2020	John Ware Reclaimed	Screenwriter Director	

== Awards ==
Year	Nominated work	Award	Category	Result	Ref.
1997	One Thing That's True	Governor General's Award	English-language children's literature	Finalist	
2002	I Have Been in Danger	Alberta Literary Awards	R. Ross Annett Award for Children’s Literature	Finalist	
2003	I Have Been in Danger	Forest of Reading Awards	Silver Birch Award	Finalist	
2008	—	Harry Jerome Award	Arts	Winner	
2013	—	WGC Screenwriting Awards	Sondra Kelly Screenplay Award	Winner	
2015	John Ware Reimagined	Alberta Literary Awards	Gwen Pharis Ringwood Award for Drama	Winner	
2020	John Ware Reclaimed	Calgary International Film Festival Awards	CTV Alberta Feature Audience Choice Award	Winner	
2021	John Ware Reclaimed	Vues d'Afrique Awards	Grand Prix Regards d'Ici	Winner	
2021	—	Calgary Black Achievement Awards	Arts, Entertainment and Media Award	Winner	
2021	—	Lieutenant Governor of Alberta Distinguished Artist Award	—	Winner	
2022	—	Alberta Order of Excellence	—	Winner	
2022	—	Queen Elizabeth II Platinum Jubilee Medal#Alberta	—	Winner	
2025	—	King Charles III Coronation Medal	—	Winner	
