= Henley Beach railway station =

Former railway station in South Australia, Australia

Henley Beach

General information
- Location: Military Road and Main Road; Henley Beach
- Line: Henley Beach Line

History
- Opened: 1894
- Closed: 31 August 1957

Services
Preceding station	Adelaide Metro	Following station
Marlborough Street towards Old Grange	Henley Beach line (closed)	Terminus
Location

Henley Beach railway station was a railway station in the western Adelaide suburb of Henley Beach.

== History ==
The station opened in 1894 and served as the terminus of the Henley Beach railway line. Sometime prior to 1940 (perhaps as early as 31 October 1913), the terminus station on the line (Henley Beach station) was closed, with the "Jetty Road" station becoming the terminus and being renamed Henley Beach, resulting in 4 stations on the line. Facilities consisted of an island platform and shelter with a ticket office.

It was closed on 31 August 1957 due to the dangerous conditions caused by vehicles on Military Road, and the station structure was demolished entirely shortly after.

== See also ==
- List of closed Adelaide railway stations
