= Mildred Lewis Ware =

Canadian schoolteacher (c. 1871–1905)

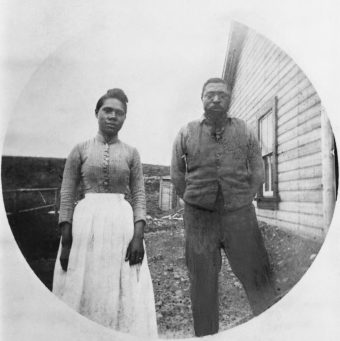
- John and Mildred Ware, Millarville, Alberta, 1892
- Born: March 21, 1871; York, Ontario
- Died: March 30, 1905 (aged 33–34)
- Occupations: Schoolteacher, bookkeeper
- Spouse: John Ware

Mildred Lewis Ware (c. 1871–1905) was a Black Canadian schoolteacher, and wife to Black cowboy, John Ware.

== Biography ==
Mildred Lewis Ware was born on March 21, 1871, in York, Ontario. She lived in the Toronto area until she moved with her family to Alberta in 1889. She married John Ware on Tuesday March 1, 1892, in Calgary, Alberta. Once married, Mildred helped John with his 200 head of cattle; however, Mildred never learned to ride a horse. In 1893, Mildred gave birth to their first daughter, Amanda Janet Nettie Ware. Mildred and John would go on to have four sons and two daughters until 1901, with five of them surviving until adulthood. In 1902, the Ware family moved to a new ranch in the Rosebud area; nevertheless, their home was destroyed by a flooding of the Red Deer River. Mildred and her family survived the flooding and prospered, increasing their head of cattle to 1000. As a previous schoolteacher, Mildred was able to read and write, whereas her husband John was unable to do either. These skills left Mildred in charge of the bookkeeping for the ranch. Additionally, she was able to teach her children to read and write. Their children attended school in Blairmore, living with Mildred’s family. In 1905, Mildred died of pneumonia at the age of 34. John died five months after Mildred, leaving their children to be raised by their grandmother.
