= John Ware Reclaimed =

2020 Canadian documentary film

- Directed by: Cheryl Foggo
- Written by: Cheryl Foggo
- Produced by: Bonnie Thompson
- Cinematography: Douglas Munro
- Edited by: Margot McMaster
- Music by: Miranda Martini; Corb Lund; Alec Harrison
- Production company: National Film Board of Canada
- Release date: September 24, 2020 (CIFF)
- Running time: 71 minutes
- Country: Canada
- Language: English

John Ware Reclaimed is a 2020 Canadian documentary film, directed by Cheryl Foggo. The film profiles John Ware, an African American man who moved to Alberta in the 1880s and became one of the province's first significant ranchers.

Made for the National Film Board of Canada, the film blends a portrait of her own contemporary investigation into Ware's history with animation, music and historical reenactments in which Ware is portrayed by cowboy and actor Fred Whitfield.

The film premiered at the Calgary International Film Festival on September 24, 2020, and was subsequently screened at the 2020 Vancouver International Film Festival.
