= Calgary International Film Festival =

Canadian film festival

Coordinates: 51.045°N 114.057°W

CIFF | Calgary International Film Festival
- Location: Calgary, Alberta, Canada
- Founded: September 2000
- Most recent: 2023
- Website: ciffcalgary.ca

The Calgary International Film Festival (CIFF) is a film festival held annually in Calgary, Alberta, in late September and early October.

CIFF is the largest international film festival in Alberta and the sixth largest in Canada.

In 2020, their festival screened 180 films including the world premiere of John Ware Reclaimed, by Cheryl Foggo from the NFB.

== Festival venues ==
As of September 2026, Calgary International Film Festival films have been screened at the following venues in Calgary. Most are located in the downtown core, with several others in nearby neighbourhoods:

- Globe Cinema
- The Plaza Theatre
- The GRAND
- Cineplex Chinook
- Jack Singer Concert Hall (former venue)
- National Music Centre (NMC) at Studio Bell (former venue)
- Telus SPARK (former venue)
- Eau Claire Market Cineplex (since demolished)

== History ==
The festival began in 2000 with a screening of the locally produced film Waydowntown, and brought in an attendance of 8000 people over six days. Growing steadily over the years, in 2016, the festival welcomed 36,693 people to 211 films, shorts, and other industry events.

In 2016, The Academy of Motion Pictures Arts and Sciences named the CIFF a qualifying festival for the Best Animated Short Film and Live Action Short Film awards. CIFF Executive Director Steve Schroeder stated that the status was a "testament to the strength of CIFF's short film section, and especially the talent of the filmmakers."

Since 2016, CIFF has made MovieMaker's annual list of "50 Film Festivals Worth the Entry Fee", following their place on the list in 2009. The annually complied list provides a guide for independent filmmakers to inform them which festivals they should submit to and attend.

For its 20th anniversary the festival showcased over 180 multi-genre films from Canada as well as 50 other countries and welcomed filmmakers, Ivan Reitman and Jason Reitman for an in-conversation appearance.

In 2020, their festival expanded to a hybrid model, offering in-cinema experiences and at-home streaming for audiences in Alberta, Saskatchewan, and Manitoba.

== Film sections ==
There are a number of different sections of films screened, with the films being grouped into series by genre or country of production. These are: Official Selection, Special Presentations, Alberta Spotlight, Generation Next, Emerging Canadian Narrative, Late Shift (horror/sci-fi/thrillers), International Narrative Competition, International Documentary, Canadian Documentary, and Short Films.

Since 2016, the festival is an Academy Award qualifier for short films. This means that the winner of the CIFF "Best of Shorts" award is eligible to be considered for an Academy Award.

The festival places strong importance on local Albertan filmmakers, and much of its content is curated from the province. New in 2016, the Alberta Scene series includes an event titled Showcase Alberta: in 2016, this was a screening of the 10th-season premiere of the CBC hit drama series Heartland. Hundreds of fans from all over the world visited Calgary for the event. In 2017, the festival did a Q&A with the cast and creator of the Alberta filmed show Wynonna Earp.

== Behind the Screen guests ==
As part of their Behind the Screen section, the Calgary International Film Festival holds Q&A sessions, as well as opportunities to meet the film creators, in addition to the regular film screenings.

== Awards ==
At the 2020 festival, CIFF distributed $24,500 in cash prizes to feature and short filmmakers.

- $10,000 CAD: RBC Emerging Canadian Artist Award
- $5,000 CAD: DGC Best Canadian Documentary Award
- $1,000 CAD: Best International Narrative Feature
- $1,000 CAD: Best International Documentary Feature
- $2,500 CAD: Grand Jury Prize for Best Narrative Short (Live-Action or Animated)
- $1,000 CAD: Best Live Action Short Film Award
- $1,000 CAD: Best Documentary Short Film Award
- $1,000 CAD: Best Animated Short Film Award
- $1,000 CAD: Best Alberta Short Film Award
- $1,000 CAD: Best Student Short Film Award

== Other events ==
In addition to hosting the Film Festival in the fall, CIFF hosts a monthly documentary series called Top Docs, a monthly international film series called Global Perspectives, and a monthly Music on Screen series.

== See also ==
- List of festivals in Calgary
- Festivals in Alberta
