= John Ware (cowboy) =

Black Canadian cowboy (1845–1905)

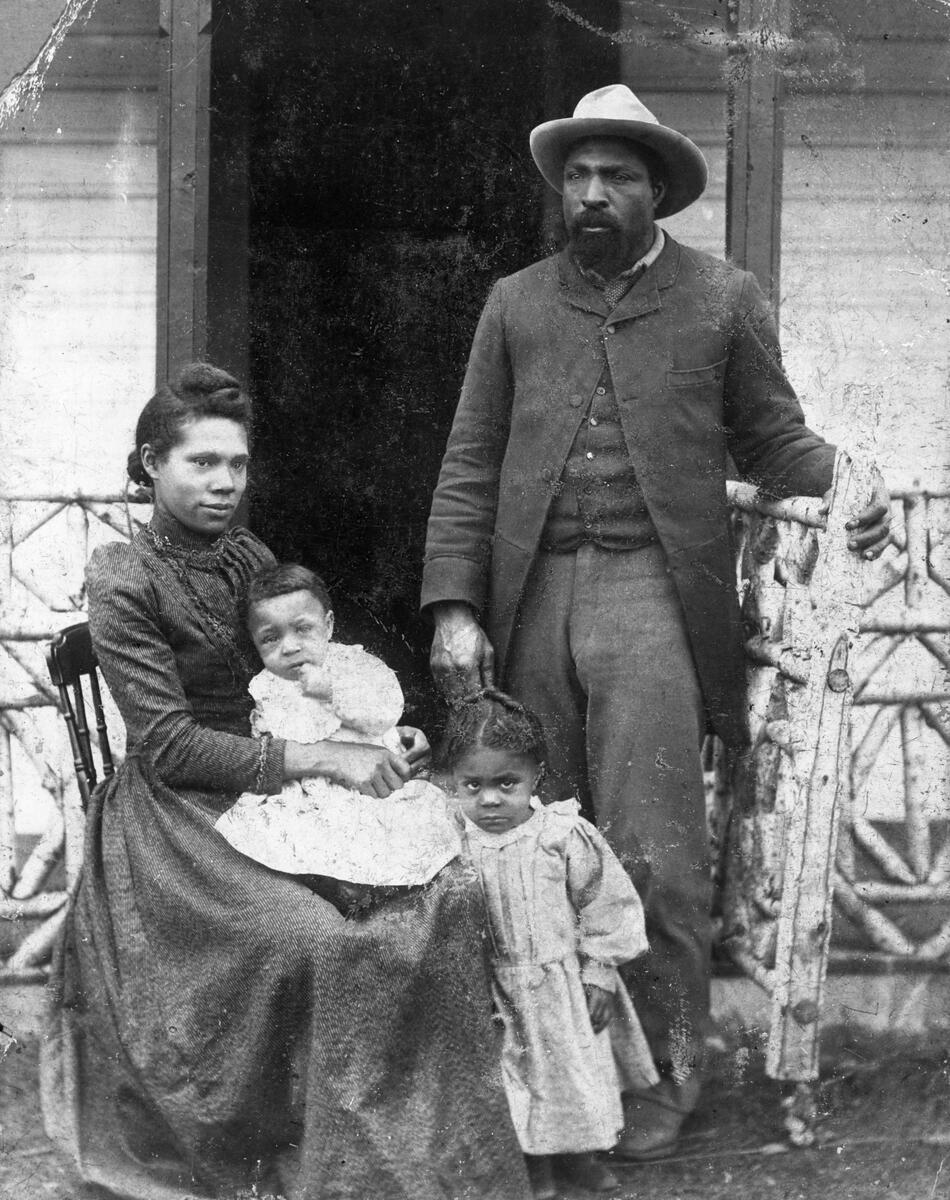
- John Ware and Family, c. 1897
- Born: c. 1845; Georgetown County, South Carolina, U.S. or Tennessee, U.S.
- Died: September 11, 1905 near Duchess, Alberta, Canada
- Occupations: Rancher, cowboy
- Years active: 1882–1905
- Spouse: Mildred Lewis

John Ware (c. 1845 – 11 September 1905) was a Canadian cowboy who was influential in the early years of the burgeoning ranching industry in southern Alberta. Remembered for his excellent horsemanship, he was among the first ranchers in Alberta, arriving in 1882 on a cattle drive from the United States and settling to ranch until his death in 1905.

== Biography ==
John Ware was born into slavery, and there are no records of his birth. The historian, J. W. Grant MacEwan, claimed he was born on a plantation near Georgetown, South Carolina. However, on his marriage certificate, Ware himself stated he was born in Tennessee. After the American Civil War, he left for Texas, where he learned the skills of a rancher and became a cowboy. Ware then worked his way north to Canada driving cattle from Texas to Montana. In 1882, he was hired to help bring 3,000 head of cattle from the United States to Sir Hugh Allan's North-West Cattle Co in Alberta. After delivering his charge near Calgary, he found work at the Bar U and Quorn ranches before starting his own ranch near the Red Deer River. By 1900, he and his wife, Mildred Lewis (1871–1905), had five children. He moved from the Calgary Region to an area northeast of the village of Duchess, Alberta. In 1902 his first home was destroyed by flooding during spring. He rebuilt his home on higher ground overlooking a stream, now called Ware Creek. In the spring of 1905, Mildred died of pneumonia, and despite being a master horseman, John was killed only months later when his horse tripped in a badger hole. The horse crushed him in the fall, breaking Ware's neck and killing him. His funeral was reported to be one of the largest held in the early days of Calgary. He was interred at Union Cemetery.

Like any other folk hero, there are several tales about his ability to eat, ride, and shoot, all of which contribute to the cowboy lore of the time. It is said that he was never tossed from a wild horse and that he popularized steer wrestling, which would then become a highlight of the Calgary Stampede. His story is that of a remarkable figure in history who helped to lay the foundations of the ranching industry in Western Canada and at the same time defied stereotypes. Ware became one of the most well-known and well-respected figures on the Albertan frontier and is still an important part of the history of Alberta.

== Legacy ==
Ware is the subject of a biography, John Ware's Cow Country by J. W. Grant MacEwan (Edmonton: Institute of Applied Art, 1960. Second edition, Saskatoon: Western Producer Prairie Books, 1973. Third edition, Vancouver: Greystone Books, 1995.)

The book, "High Rider" by Bill Gallaher features a fictionalized account of Ware's life and exploits. (Touchwood Editions. ISBN 978-1-77151-114-8).

A children's book, "Howdy, I'm John Ware" by Ayesha Clough, with illustrations by Hugh Rookwood, was published in 2020. Red Barn Books. ISBN 9781999108786.

Several geographical features near the Wares' ranch are named in their honour:

- John Ware Ridge (renamed from Nigger John Ridge in 1970)
- Mount Ware
- Ware Creek

Other namesakes include "John Ware Junior High School" in southwest Calgary, the John Ware building at Calgary's Southern Alberta Institute of Technology (SAIT), a polytechnic undergraduate college, and the John Ware 4-H Beef Club in Duchess, Alberta. In 1958 the modest log cabin that was the family home from 1900 to 1905 was relocated from its prairie setting near Millicent, Alberta, to the Red Deer River valley in Dinosaur Provincial Park, about 20 kilometres to the east. The cabin was restored and rededicated in 2002. Diamond Joe White, a musician from Alberta, has released a song titled "High Rider: The John Ware Story".

None of John and Mildred's five children who lived to adulthood had descendants. Their last surviving daughter, Nettie, died on her 96th birthday in March 1989 in Vulcan, Alberta. Their last son, Arthur, died in Burnaby, British Columbia, in May 1989; however, relatives of Mildred Ware still reside in New Jersey and British Columbia.

In 2006, a small fragment of wood from the cabin at Dinosaur Provincial Park was contributed to the Six String Nation project. The fragment now serves as the topmost element on the pick-guard assembly of Voyageur, the guitar at the heart of the project.

Canada Post issued a commemorative stamp featuring John Ware, to celebrate Black History Month in 2012.

He is the subject of Cheryl Foggo's 2020 documentary film John Ware Reclaimed. The John Ware Institute in Canada which was founded by Akolisa Ufodike is named after him.

In 2022, John Ware was designated as a person of National Historic Significance by the Government of Canada. A commemorative plaque was placed at Bar U Ranch National Historic Site, Longview, Alberta.
