= Parafield railway station =

Railway station in Adelaide, South Australia

Parafield
- Parafield Railway Station in 2026.

General information
- Location: Kings Road, Parafield
- Coordinates: 34°46′59″S 138°37′51″E
- Owner: Department for Infrastructure & Transport
- Operator: Adelaide Metro
- Line: Gawler
- Distance: 17.7 km from Adelaide
- Platforms: 2
- Tracks: 2
- Connections: None

Construction
- Structure type: Ground
- Parking: Yes
- Cycle facilities: Yes
- Accessible: Yes

Other information
- Station code: 16554 (to City); 18546 (to Gawler Central)
- Website: Adelaide Metro

History
- Opened: 1928
- Rebuilt: 1982 & 2008

Services
Preceding station	Adelaide Metro	Following station
Parafield Gardens towards Adelaide	Gawler line	Chidda towards Gawler Central
Location

Parafield railway station is located on the Gawler line. Situated in the northern Adelaide suburb of Parafield, it is 17.7 kilometres (11.0 mi) from Adelaide station.

== History ==
Parafield opened in 1928 to serve the then-under construction Parafield Airport, located adjacent to the line.

In 1982, the station was rebuilt at the same time as standardisation of the mainline from Adelaide to Port Pirie. In April 2008, the eastern platform was rebuilt, followed by the western platform in 2014. The project included the construction of a new park-and-ride facility on the eastern side of the station. To the west of the station lies the Australian Rail Track Corporation standard gauge line to Crystal Brook.

== Platforms and services ==
Parafield has two side platforms and is serviced by Adelaide Metro Gawler line services. It is a designated high-frequency station, with trains scheduled every 15 minutes on weekdays, between 7:30am and 6:30pm.

Platform	Destination
1	Gawler and Gawler Central
2	Adelaide
