= Chidda railway station =

Railway station in Adelaide, South Australia

Chidda
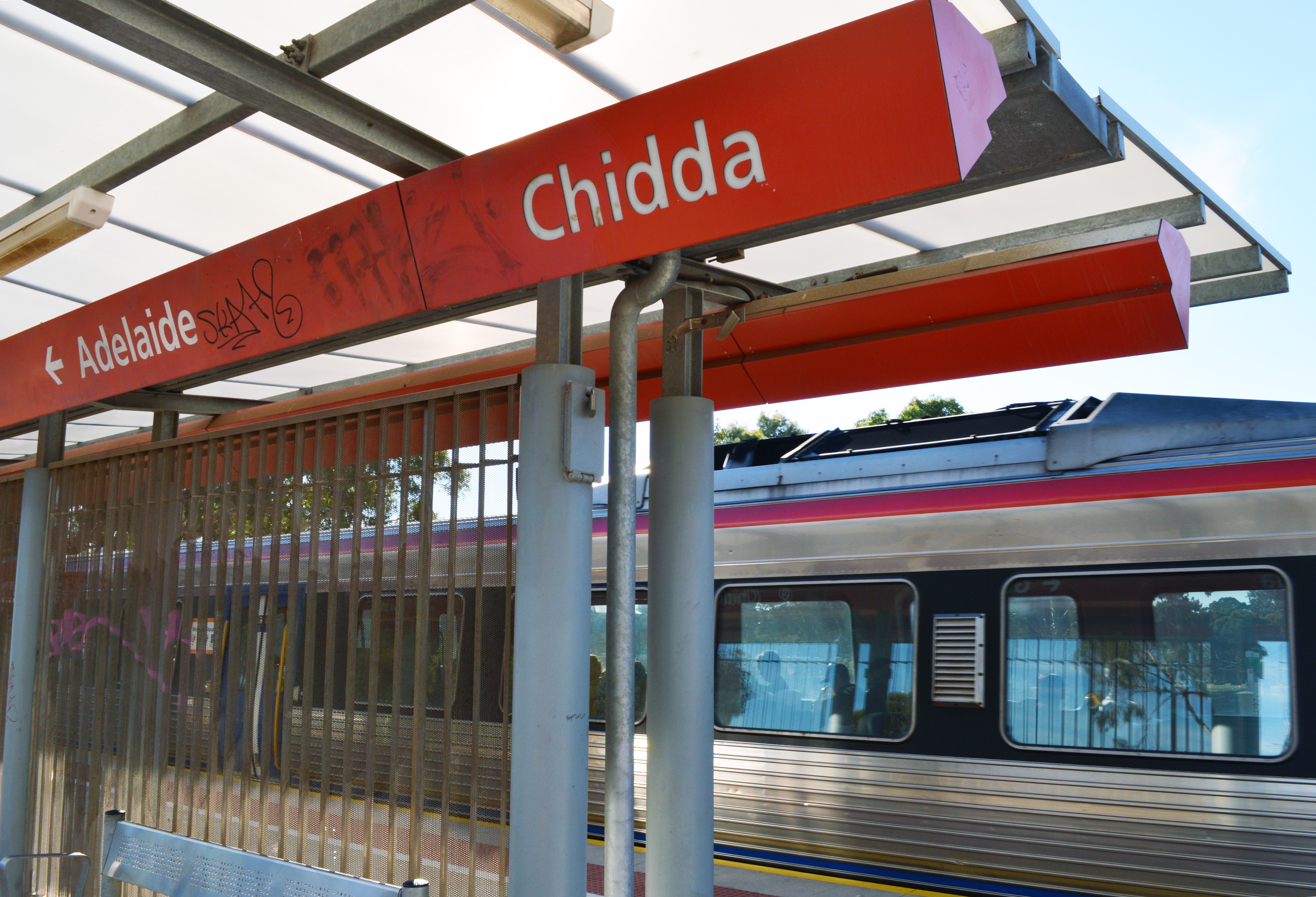
- Station shelter and platform signage, December 2019

General information
- Location: York Terrace, Salisbury
- Coordinates: 34°46′30″S 138°38′17″E
- Owner: Department for Infrastructure & Transport
- Operator: Adelaide Metro
- Line: Gawler
- Distance: 18.6 km from Adelaide
- Platforms: 2
- Tracks: 2
- Connections: None

Construction
- Structure type: Ground
- Parking: Yes
- Cycle facilities: No
- Accessible: Yes

Other information
- Station code: 16500 (to City); 18547 (to Gawler Central)
- Website: Adelaide Metro

History
- Rebuilt: 1974 & 2012

Services
Preceding station	Adelaide Metro	Following station
Parafield towards Adelaide	Gawler line	Salisbury towards Gawler Central
Location

Chidda railway station is located on the Gawler line. Situated in the northern Adelaide suburb of Salisbury, it is 18.6 kilometres (11.6 mi) from Adelaide station.

== History ==
The name "Chidda" is derived from Kaurna the local indigenous language, for the word "little bird" and the stopping place has also been known as the "Spains Road siding". It is unclear when this station opened, with a mention made in 1936 of "a landing place for passengers who join and alight from the Gawler rail car."

Chidda initially had step down platforms, where a length of 122 metres was provided. In the second half of 1974, they were replaced by the current island platform of the same length. To the west of the station lies the Australian Rail Track Corporation standard gauge line to Crystal Brook.

== Platforms and Services ==
Chidda has one island platform, that is serviced by Adelaide Metro trains. Trains are scheduled every 30 minutes, seven days a week.

Platform	Destination
1	Gawler and Gawler Central
2	Adelaide

Chidda is the closest station directly opposite Salisbury Memorial Park, a non-denominational cemetery.
