= Ovingham railway station =

Railway station in Adelaide, South Australia

Ovingham
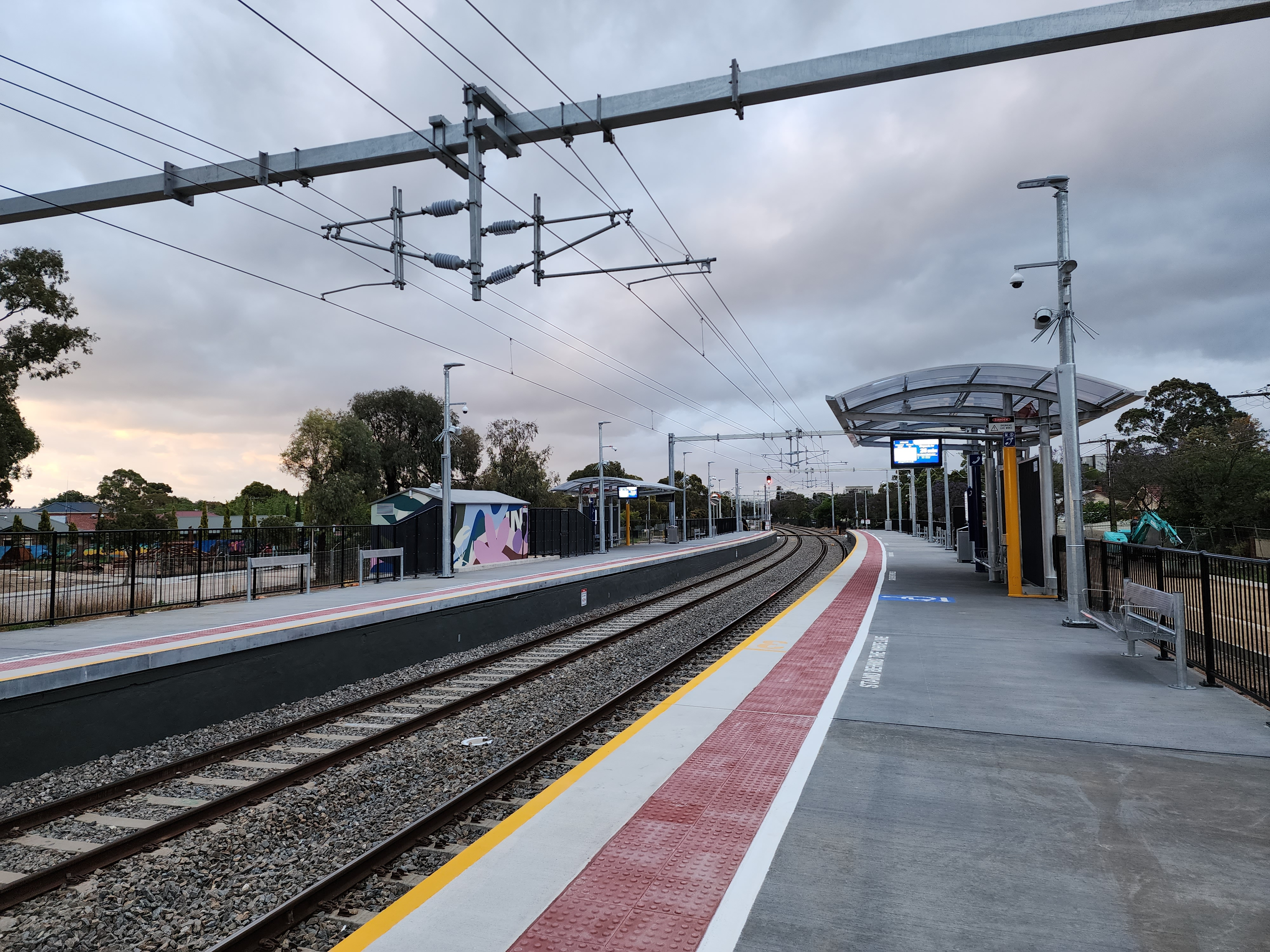
- Northbound view from Platform 2, November 2022

General information
- Location: Devonport Terrace, Ovingham
- Coordinates: 34°53′46″S 138°35′4″E
- Owner: Department for Infrastructure & Transport
- Operator: Adelaide Metro
- Line: Gawler
- Distance: 3.6 km from Adelaide
- Platforms: 2
- Connections: Bus

Construction
- Structure type: Ground
- Parking: No
- Cycle facilities: No
- Accessible: yes

Other information
- Station code: 16553 (to City); 18500 (to Gawler Central)
- Website: Adelaide Metro

History
- Opened: 1880s
- Closed: 2020
- Rebuilt: 7 November 2022

Services
| Preceding station | Adelaide Metro | Following station |
|---|---|---|
| North Adelaide towards Adelaide | Gawler line | Dudley Park towards Gawler Central |
Location

Ovingham railway station is located on the Gawler line. Situated in the inner northern Adelaide suburb of Ovingham, it is located 3.6 kilometres (2.2 mi) from Adelaide station.

== History ==
The station opened in the early 1880s.

It is one of the very few stations in the network with no dedicated passenger parking. The station is serviced by two tracks. The two side platforms are accessible by pedestrian crossings at either end. The standard gauge line behind the Gawler bound platform is only used for interstate passenger and freight services.

=== Grade separation ===
Funding for a grade separation of Torrens Road and the Gawler line was announced in the 2019/2020 state budget, with a combined contribution of $231 million from the Federal and State governments. The preferred design was revealed in June 2020 which would see an overpass built for Torrens Road to run over the Gawler line; the nearby intersection of Torrens and Churchill Roads would also be raised to meet the elevated height of Torrens Road. Major construction commenced in 2021 with anticipated completion in 2023. The station itself was partly demolished in March 2022 during construction works, and remained closed when the Gawler line reopened in June 2022. Ovingham station later reopened on 7 November 2022, complete with new platforms, lighting, signage and shelters.

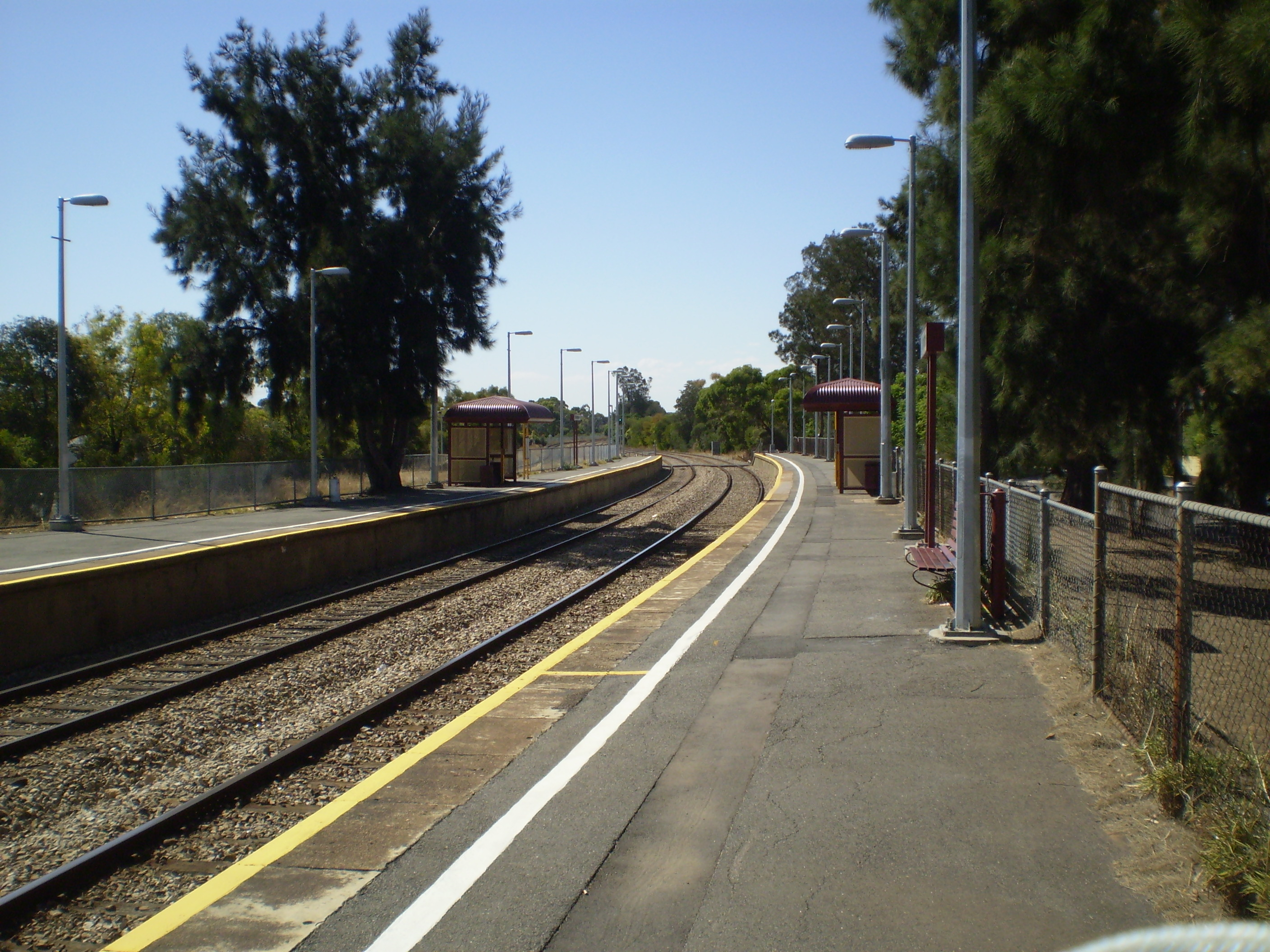
Ovingham station in March 2008, prior to its major upgrade in 2022

== Services by platform ==
| Platform | Destination |
|---|---|
| 1 | Gawler/Gawler Central |
| 2 | Adelaide |

== Transport Links ==
There are five bus routes near Ovingham station on nearby Churchill Road and Torrens Road.

Bus transfers: Stop Stop 8 Churchill Rd
| Route no. | Destination & route details |
| 235 | to Kilburn |
| 238 | to Mawson Lakes |
| 239 | to Arndale Central |

Bus transfers: Stop Stop 8 Torrens Rd
| Route no. | Destination & route details |
| 230 | to Port Adelaide |
| 232 | to Port Adelaide via Newcastle St |
