= Kilburn railway station, Adelaide =

Railway station in Adelaide, South Australia

Kilburn
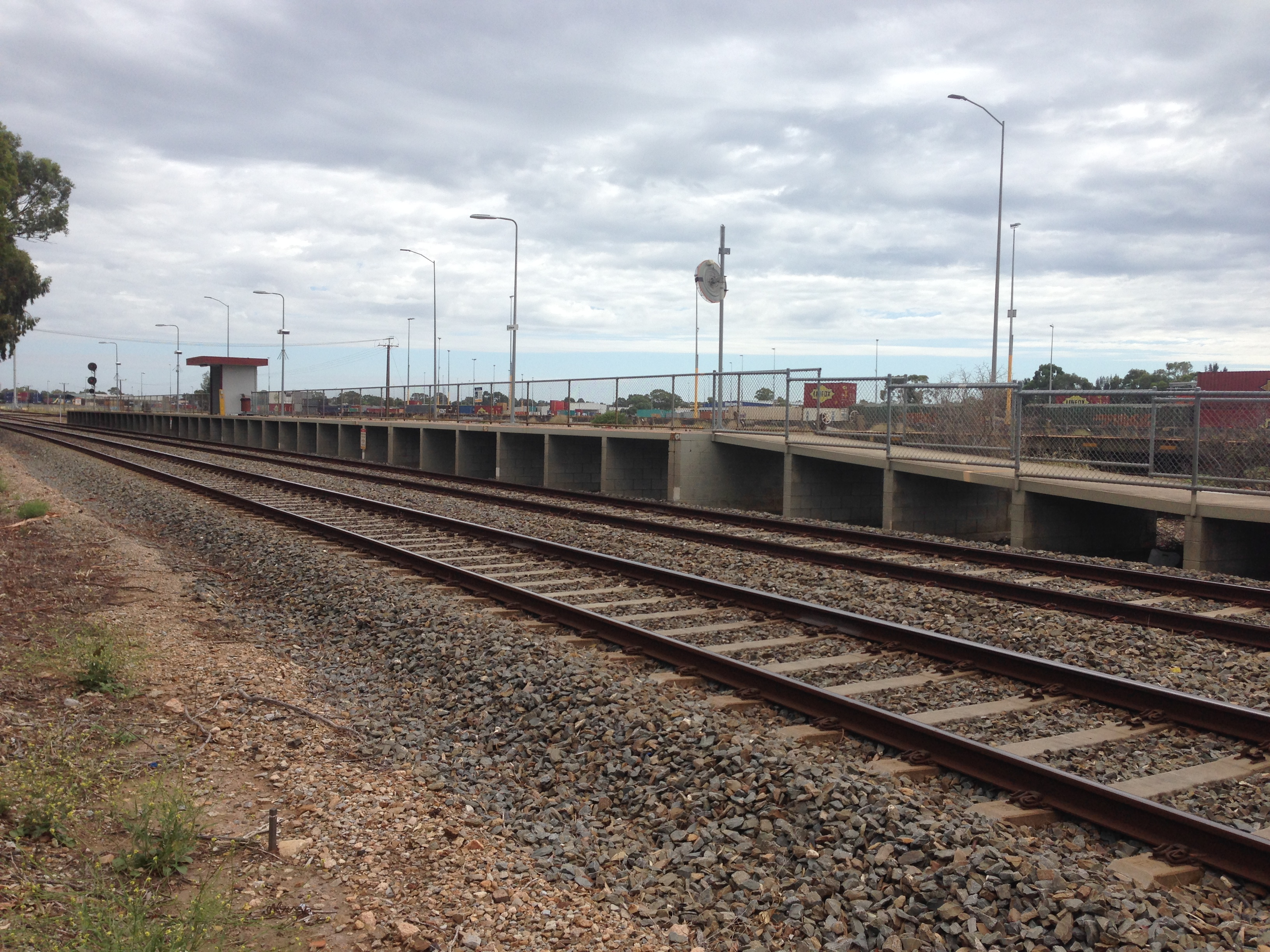
- Southbound view of Platform 1, January 2017

General information
- Location: Railway Terrace, Kilburn
- Coordinates: 34.8601568°S 138.5785832°E
- Owner: Department for Infrastructure & Transport
- Operator: Adelaide Metro
- Line: Gawler
- Distance: 7.7 km from Adelaide
- Platforms: 2
- Tracks: 2
- Connections: None

Construction
- Structure type: Ground
- Parking: Yes
- Cycle facilities: No
- Accessible: Yes

Other information
- Station code: 16530 (to City); 18541 (to Gawler Central)
- Website: Adelaide Metro

History
- Opened: 1915

Services
Preceding station	Adelaide Metro	Following station
Islington towards Adelaide	Gawler line	Dry Creek towards Gawler Central
Location

Kilburn railway station is located on the Gawler line. The station is situated in the inner northern Adelaide suburb of Kilburn, it is 7.7 kilometres (4.8 mi) from Adelaide station.

== History ==
The station opened in 1915, as "Chicago", to serve the previously existing Adelaide suburb of the same name. In the 1920s, the station and suburb were renamed Kilburn.

To the west of the station lies the Australian Rail Track Corporation standard gauge line to Crystal Brook.

== Platforms and Services ==
Kilburn has two staggered side platforms and is serviced by Adelaide Metro Gawler line services. Trains are scheduled every 30 minutes, and on weekdays most services terminate at Gawler Central only.

Platform	Destination
1	Gawler and Gawler Central
2	Adelaide
