= Salisbury railway station, Adelaide =

Railway station in Adelaide, South Australia

Salisbury
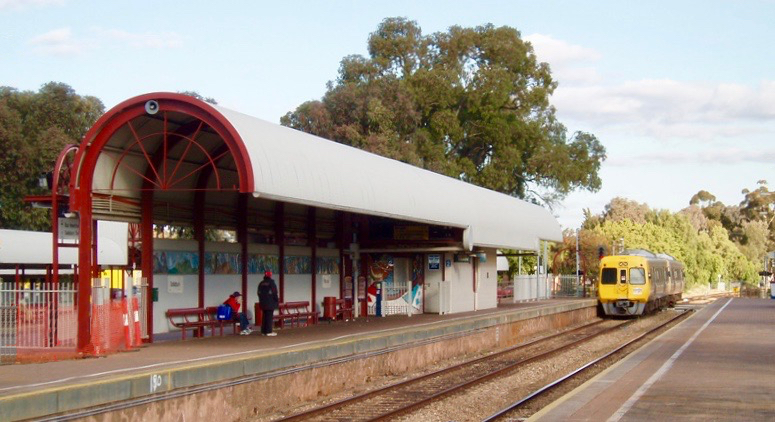
- Southbound view from Platform 1, June 2006

General information
- Location: Park Terrace, Salisbury
- Coordinates: 34°45′47″S 138°38′33″E
- System: Railway station and bus interchange
- Owner: Department for Infrastructure & Transport
- Operator: Adelaide Metro
- Line: Gawler
- Distance: 20.2 km from Adelaide
- Platforms: 2
- Tracks: 2
- Connections: Bus

Construction
- Structure type: Ground, side platforms
- Parking: Yes
- Cycle facilities: Yes
- Accessible: Yes

Other information
- Station code: 16558 (to City); 18548 (to Gawler Central)
- Website: Adelaide Metro

History
- Opened: 29 December 1856
- Rebuilt: 17 December 1985

Services
Preceding station	Adelaide Metro	Following station
Chidda towards Adelaide	Gawler line	Nurlutta towards Gawler Central
Mawson Lakes towards Adelaide	Gawler line Super Express	Elizabeth towards Gawler Central
Preceding station	Australian Rail Track Corporation	Following station
Chidda towards Adelaide	Adelaide–Port Augusta railway line	Direk towards Port Augusta
Peak Hours
Preceding station	Adelaide Metro	Following station
Mawson Lakes towards Adelaide	Salisbury Line	Terminus
Location

Salisbury railway station is a railway station and bus interchange in the northern Adelaide suburb of Salisbury. It is on the Gawler line, 20.2 kilometres (12.6 mi) from Adelaide station. Adjoining it is a large park & ride carpark, making it one of the busiest stations on the Adelaide suburban rail system.

== History ==
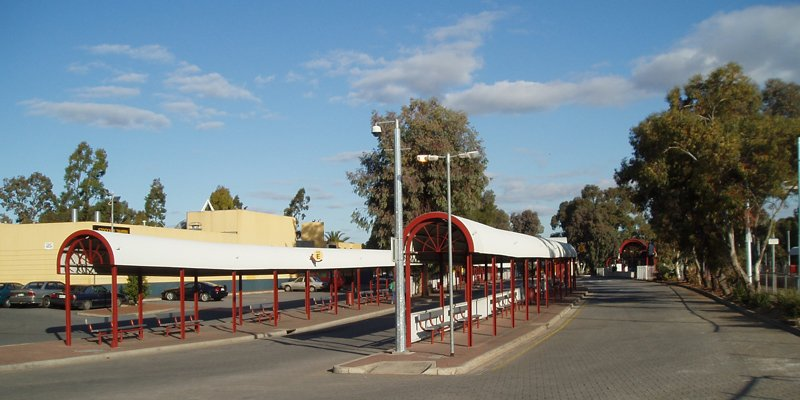
Bus interchange; railway station is to the right

Rail track layout at Salisbury Interchange in June 2006

The railway line to Salisbury opened on Monday 29th December 1856 before extending north to Smithfield in June 1857 and then Gawler in October 1857. The line was further extended to Kapunda in 1860 and Burra by 1870 to exploit the copper mining boom in those areas.

The line through Salisbury became the South Australian Railways' broad gauge Main North line, used by a variety of local and country trains, and also by passengers and freight travelling long distances to Broken Hill, Alice Springs and Kalgoorlie, (although all these interstate journeys involved changing trains at break-of-gauge stations).

In 1925, a junction was installed north of Salisbury when a new line was built to Redhill, in the state's mid-north. By 1937, this line was extended to Port Pirie and was used by the broad gauge East-West express, which connected with the Commonwealth Railways Trans-Australian service to Kalgoorlie.

In 1941, a second junction was installed north of Salisbury, from which a 6 kilometres (3.7 mi) branch line served a large, hurriedly built World War II munitions complex at Penfield, the area is now known as Edinburgh. During the war years, many hundreds of workers were conveyed to three stations on the central line of the branch since Salisbury was a largely rural community and most of the workforce had to be brought in from other districts. The central line terminated in a balloon loop to enable trains to return to Adelaide without locomotives having to "change ends" of their train. Several miles of sidings ran from the central line to munitions buildings, which were very widely separated for safety reasons. A more limited peak hour service to Penfield continued after the war, serving staff at the UK and Australian governments' Weapons Research Establishment, later to become the Defence Science and Technology Organisation. All trains were withdrawn in January 1991, due to low patronage and the need to fund an upgrade of the degraded track.

The final branch line in the area was a 700-metre access line into the Holden car plant at Elizabeth, opened in 1959. This left the Gawler line 2.4 kilometres (1.5 mi) north of Salisbury station and was used mainly by freight trains, but had passenger trains at shift change-over times. The last passenger train on the Holden branch ran in August 1992, and the remaining freight traffic stopped when the Melbourne to Adelaide line was converted to standard gauge in 1995.

In March 1978, all non-metropolitan railways in South Australia were sold to the federal government and placed under the control of Australian National (AN). Railways in the metropolitan area were retained by the State Government owned State Transport Authority (STA). The lines through Salisbury and on to Gawler remained with the STA, since they were part of the suburban system. AN had responsibility for the Port Pirie line from Salisbury Junction northwards, but needed to run its trains over STA tracks between Adelaide and Salisbury.

In 1982, AN converted the broad gauge Salisbury Junction to Port Pirie line to standard gauge (and diverted it to Crystal Brook at the northern end). A new standard gauge line was built through the Salisbury station area, completely separate from the broad gauge tracks and passing west of the Gawler line platforms. This was a single line, with no platform or any other infrastructure provided at Salisbury. This is still the situation at Salisbury today, although ownership and responsibilities have now transferred from AN to the Australian Rail Track Corporation and from the STA to Adelaide Metro.

On 17 December 1985, Salisbury station was opened as a major bus/rail interchange by State Premier John Bannon and Federal Minister for Transport Peter Morris. This was the second purpose-built transport interchange in the Adelaide metropolitan area (the first had been at Noarlunga Centre). The historic stone 1857 building on the down (west) platform, which also included a signal box, was demolished when the standard gauge line opened. The station retained a staffed ticket and information office until (circa 2005?) at which time it was closed.

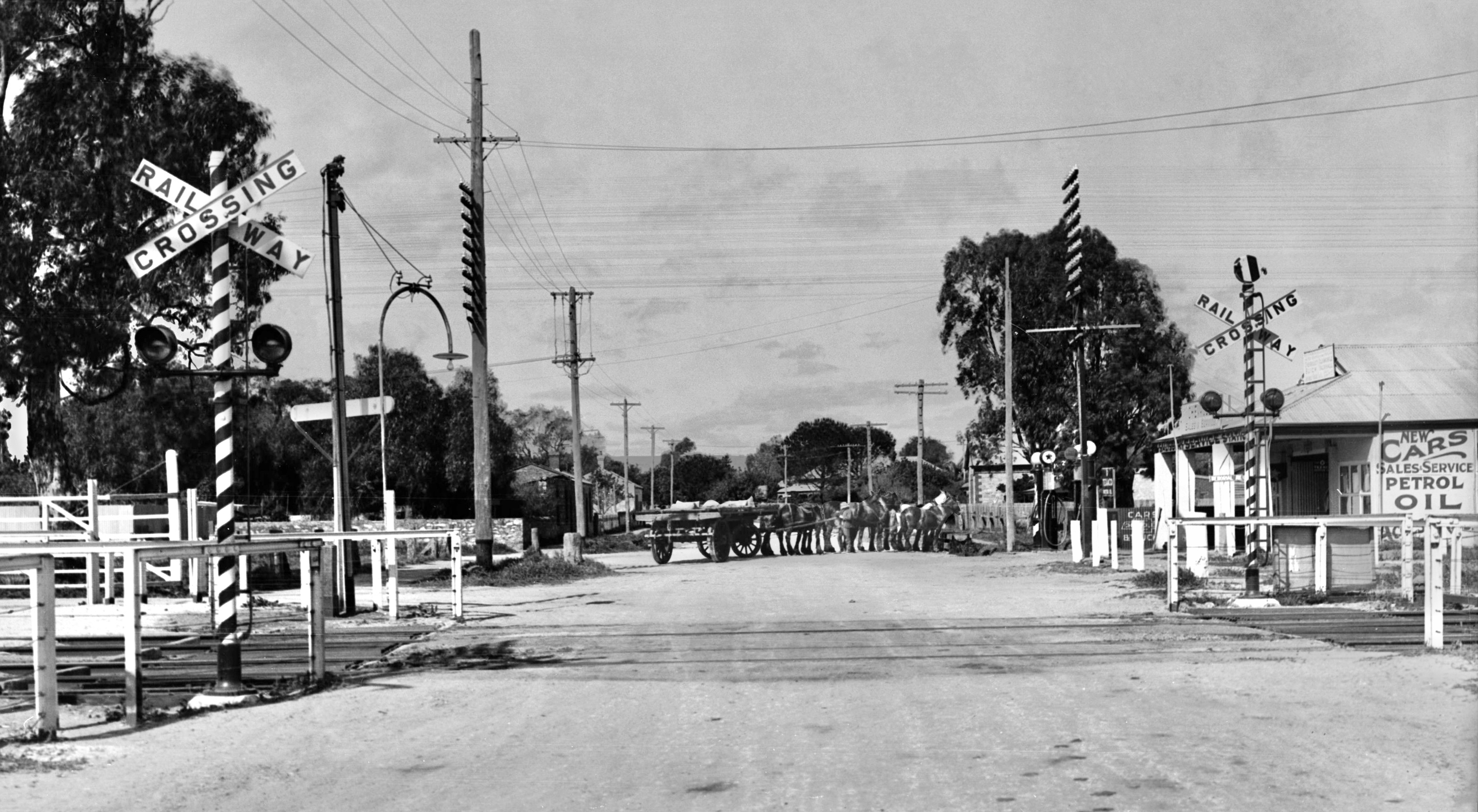
The Park Terrace level crossing in 1929

On 24 October 2002, the level crossing on Park Terrace, immediately south of the station platforms, was the scene of a fatal collision between The Ghan, several motor cars and a bus. Since then, buses to and from the bus interchange have been re-routed away from the level crossing and locking pedestrian gates have been installed. This is the first installation of this type of level crossing protection in South Australia.

In 2017, ticket validation gates were installed at the station to combat fare evasion, and were activated on September 11. Similar gates were installed some time ago at Adelaide station, and have been proposed for Noarlunga Centre.

== Services by platform ==
A number of suburban trains heading towards Gawler cross to the southbound track at Salisbury, and use Platform 2 rather than the usual northbound Platform 1. This gives passengers more convenient cross-platform access to the bus stops and eliminates the need for alighting passengers to cross the rail tracks. Trains revert to their normal track on departure.

A short siding north of the station was used to terminate and reverse several trains in the weekday peak-hours. From 27 April 2008, trains no longer terminate here with all services continuing to Gawler. It is the last remnant of the former branch line to Penfield. Currently, there is one service will terminate at Salisbury (07:51 from Adelaide, arriving Salisbury at 08:12), and using the short siding of branch line to Penfield and reverse back to Adelaide.

Platform	Destination/s	Notes
1	Gawler/Gawler Central	Used during Peak Hours and weekdays only
2	Adelaide/Gawler/Gawler Central	Used by northbound services during Non-Peak Hours and weekends

== Transport links ==
Adelaide Metro operate many bus routes via Salisbury Interchange:

Bus transfers: Stop Salisbury Interchange (Zones A-I)
Route no.	Destination & route details
404	to Paralowie anti-clockwise loop
404R	
405	to Paralowie clockwise loop
411	to Mawson Interchange and University of South Australia Mawson Lakes Campus via Paralowie & Parafield Gardens
411U	
411B	
400	to Salisbury North
401	to Paralowie
500	To City via Ingle Farm, Paradise Interchange & O-Bahn and Elizabeth Interchange
502	to City via Ingle Farm, Paradise Interchange & O-Bahn
502X	
225	to City via Para Hills, Mawson Lakes and Gepps Cross
225M	
225F	
415	to Greenwith & Golden Grove via Salisbury Heights
415H	
415V	
430	to Elizabeth Interchange via Hillbank
224	Elizabeth Interchange to City via Mawson Lakes
224F	
224X	
224M	
403	to Salisbury North
403	to Salisbury North
421	to RAAF Base Edinburgh
560	to Westfield Tea Tree Plaza & Elizabeth Interchange
560A	
560B	
560P	
402	to Riverlea Park via Waterloo Corner Road and Virginia
