= Gawler Oval railway station =

Railway station in Adelaide, South Australia

Gawler Oval
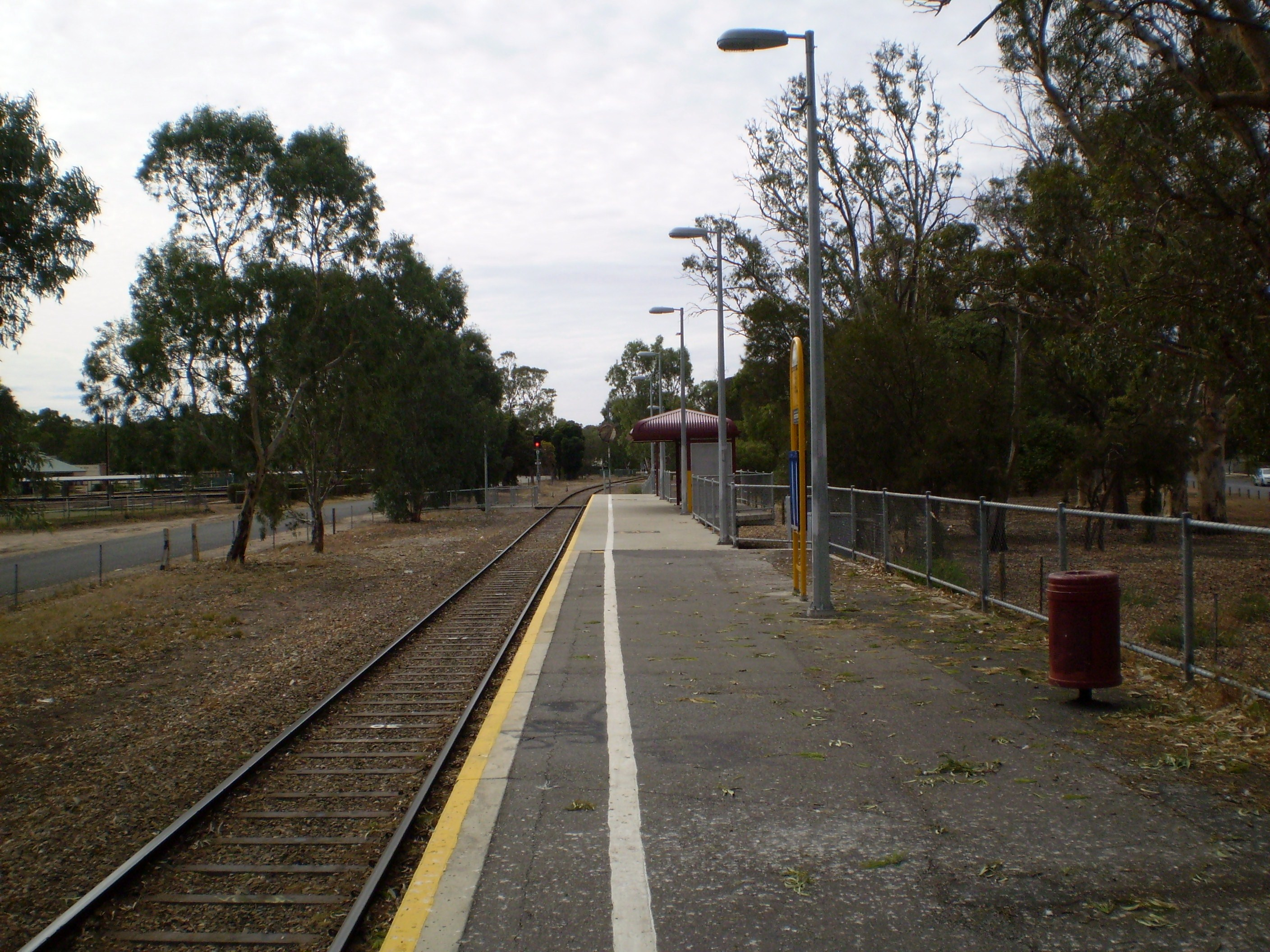
- Westbound view from the station platform, April 2008

General information
- Location: Thomas Terrace, Gawler
- Coordinates: 34°35′42″S 138°44′27″E
- Owner: Department for Infrastructure & Transport
- Operator: Adelaide Metro
- Line: Gawler
- Distance: 41.4 km from Adelaide
- Platforms: 1
- Tracks: 1
- Connections: None

Construction
- Structure type: Ground
- Parking: Yes
- Cycle facilities: No
- Accessible: Yes

Other information
- Station code: 16519 (to City); 18560 (to Gawler Central)
- Website: Adelaide Metro

History
- Opened: 1857
- Rebuilt: 2006

Services
| Preceding station | Adelaide Metro | Following station |
|---|---|---|
| Gawler towards Adelaide | Gawler line | Gawler Central Terminus |
Location

Gawler Oval railway station is located on the Gawler line. Situated in the South Australian town of Gawler, it is 41.4 kilometres (25.7 mi) from Adelaide station.

== History ==
It was opened on 1857.

During 2006, the platform at Gawler Oval was extended to accommodate three carriages and a new passenger shelter installed. Before the platform was lengthened, only two carriages could use the platforms.

== Platforms and Services ==
Gawler Oval is a single-track station with only one side platform, which accommodates Adelaide Metro services to both Gawler Central and Adelaide.

| Platform | Destination |
|---|---|
| 1 | Gawler Central/Adelaide |
