= North Adelaide railway station =

Railway station in Adelaide, South Australia

North Adelaide
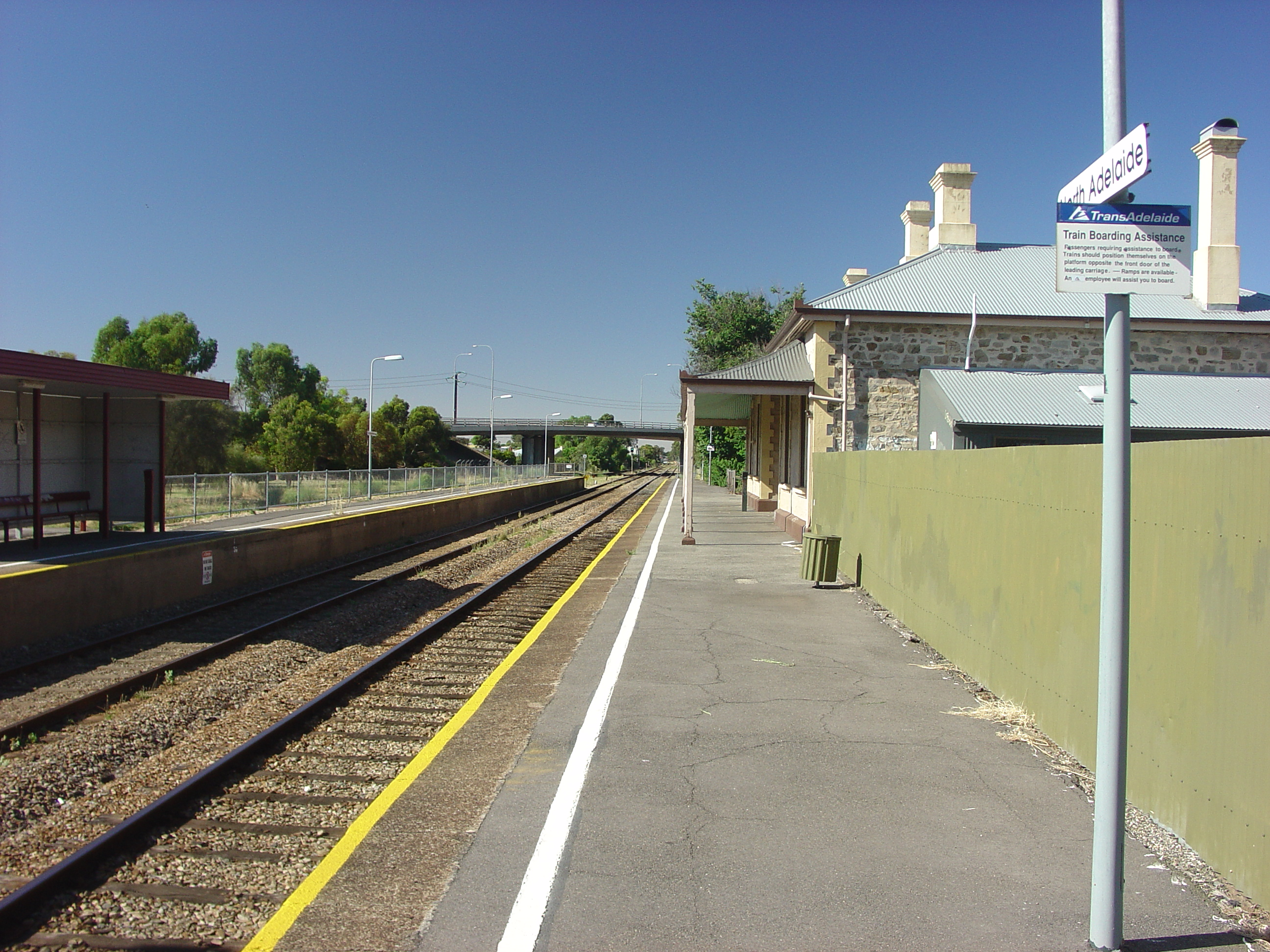
- Northbound view from Platform 2, December 2003

General information
- Location: War Memorial Drive, North Adelaide
- Coordinates: 34°54′22″S 138°34′54″E
- Owner: Department for Infrastructure & Transport
- Operator: Adelaide Metro
- Line: Gawler
- Distance: 2.5 km from Adelaide
- Platforms: 2
- Tracks: 2
- Connections: None

Construction
- Structure type: Ground, side platforms
- Parking: Yes
- Cycle facilities: No
- Accessible: Yes

Other information
- Station code: 16547 (to City); 18538 (to Gawler Central)
- Website: Adelaide Metro

History
- Opened: 1857

Services
Preceding station	Adelaide Metro	Following station
Adelaide Terminus	Gawler line	Ovingham towards Gawler Central
Location

North Adelaide railway station is a railway station located on the Gawler line in the inner northern Adelaide suburb of North Adelaide. It is 2.5 kilometres (1.6 mi) from Adelaide station. It is the least-used railway station in the Adelaide rail network in terms of patronage and number of trains that stop on scheduled services.

== History ==
North Adelaide station opened in 1857 with a station building (including a waiting room, ladies' waiting room, and ticket office), attached four-room residence, and garden, on the eastern (Adelaide-bound) platform. The building is of bluestone rubble, which was later painted. It is the oldest surviving building on the Gawler line. After Bowden, Alberton, and St Kilda railway station, Melbourne, it is the fourth-oldest railway station in Australia. In 1860, the line was extended to Kapunda.

The design is of architectural historic interest, as it somewhat unusually combines a typical mid-Victorian four-room cottage under the same roof as the business functions of the stations, presenting a symmetrical front across both sides. The Bowden and Alberton stations had no attached residences.

There is also an outbuilding to the north. In 1878 the windows, doors, and west-facing verandah over the platform were altered. In 1880 a signal box was erected south of the station building at the end of the platform, but this was demolished in the 1980s. In 1940, most trains stopped or could be requested to stop at North Adelaide.

In 1969, all trains except express trains stopped here every day. By 1982, the buildings were in a poor state of repair, and the garden derelict.

In the late 1980s, the Adelaide bound platform was shortened. Around 1990 the signal box was destroyed by fire. The station was closed for a brief period in the 1990s, having declined into a bad state of repair.

There were previously sidings and a wood yard selling firewood west of this platform where the standard gauge line to Darwin now runs.

In January 2013, North Adelaide station became the temporary terminus of the Gawler Central line while Adelaide station was closed for a month.

Special event trains for the annual Skyshow fireworks previously used this station as a terminus. When the Schützenfest was being held at the nearby Bonython Park in January each year, most trains stopped at this station.

== Location ==
The railway station is located on the western edge of the North Adelaide parklands, offering views of the parklands to the east and flat parkland and towards Bowden to the west.

== Heritage status ==
The buildings are classed as historic and listed on the Register of the National Estate. The enclosed garden still contains mature exotic trees including cotoneaster, phoenix palm, and orange. The building is the third-oldest surviving railway station in South Australia and distinct from the earlier 1856 Bowden and Alberton stations, having an attached residence.

The site was listed on the South Australian Heritage Register on 11 September 1986.

== Reuse of the station building ==
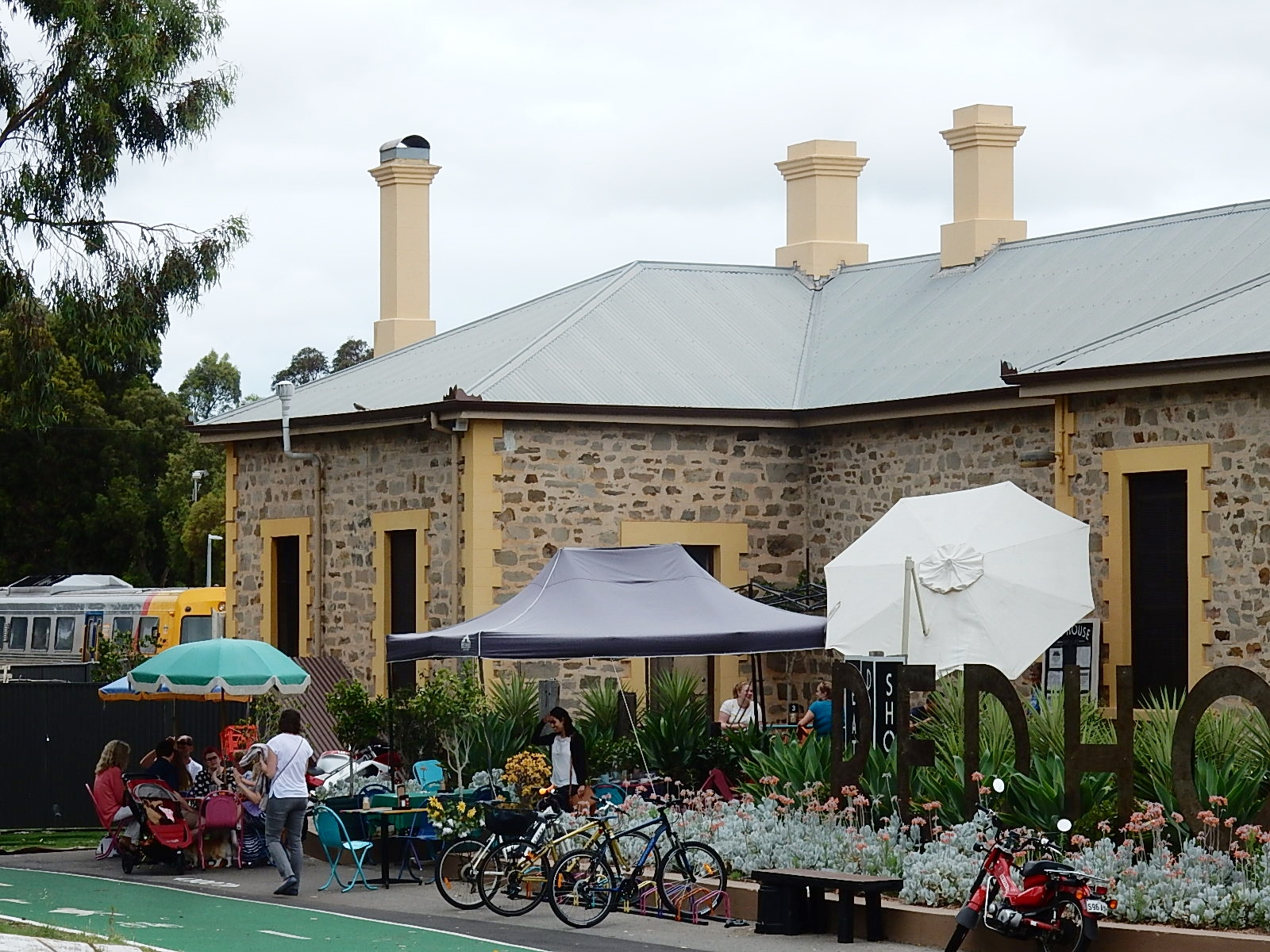
Front view (including cafe), December 2016

The station is no longer staffed, and the building is owned and managed by the City of Adelaide.

The station building has been used for a variety of uses since closure. Being listed as a state heritage building means that tenants are not allowed to modify the structure. After being vacant for around 20 years, Emily Pescod took up the lease to open café and vintage clothing retail store, moving goods from her Gilles Street Market stall. Red House occupied the premises until 2019, which then lay vacant for six years after its closure.

In September 2025, a group of artists collectively named Sharehouse, under the leadership of Alycia Bennett and Olivia Bellow, took up the lease of the building under the "Renew Adelaide" scheme. After opening in late September, it will be used as a gallery, studio, and retail space (for such items as artworks, tooth gems, and vintage clothing), along with a hairdressing and nail salon, and small cafe.

== Services by platform ==
As of September 2025, North Adelaide station is only served on weekdays.

Platform	Destination
1	Gawler and Gawler Central
2	Adelaide

== Gallery ==
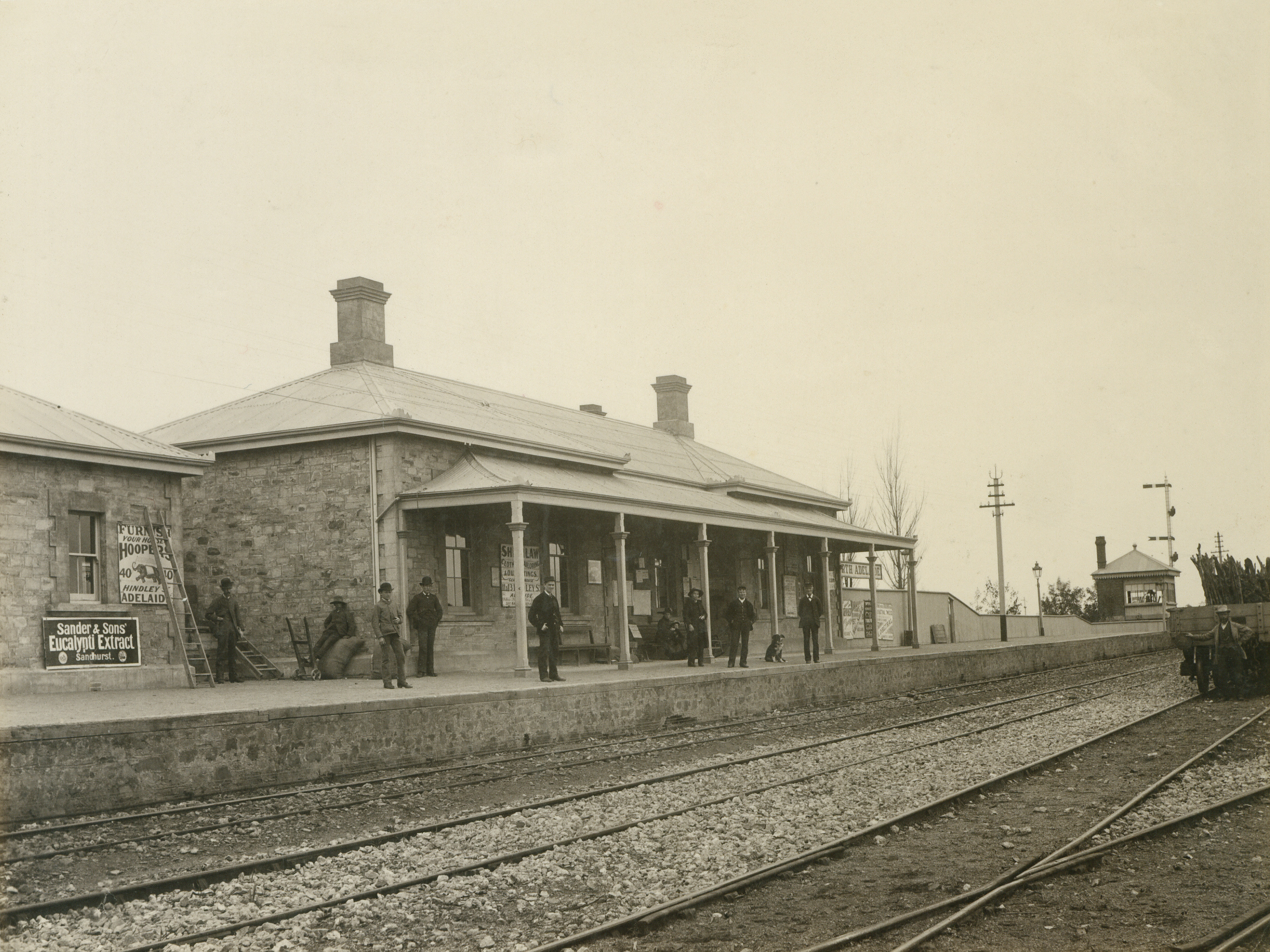
Station building with signal box in background, about 1880

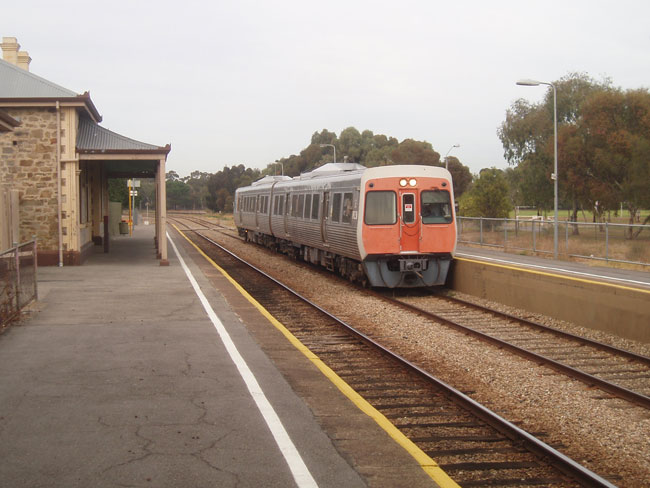
The station in 2005

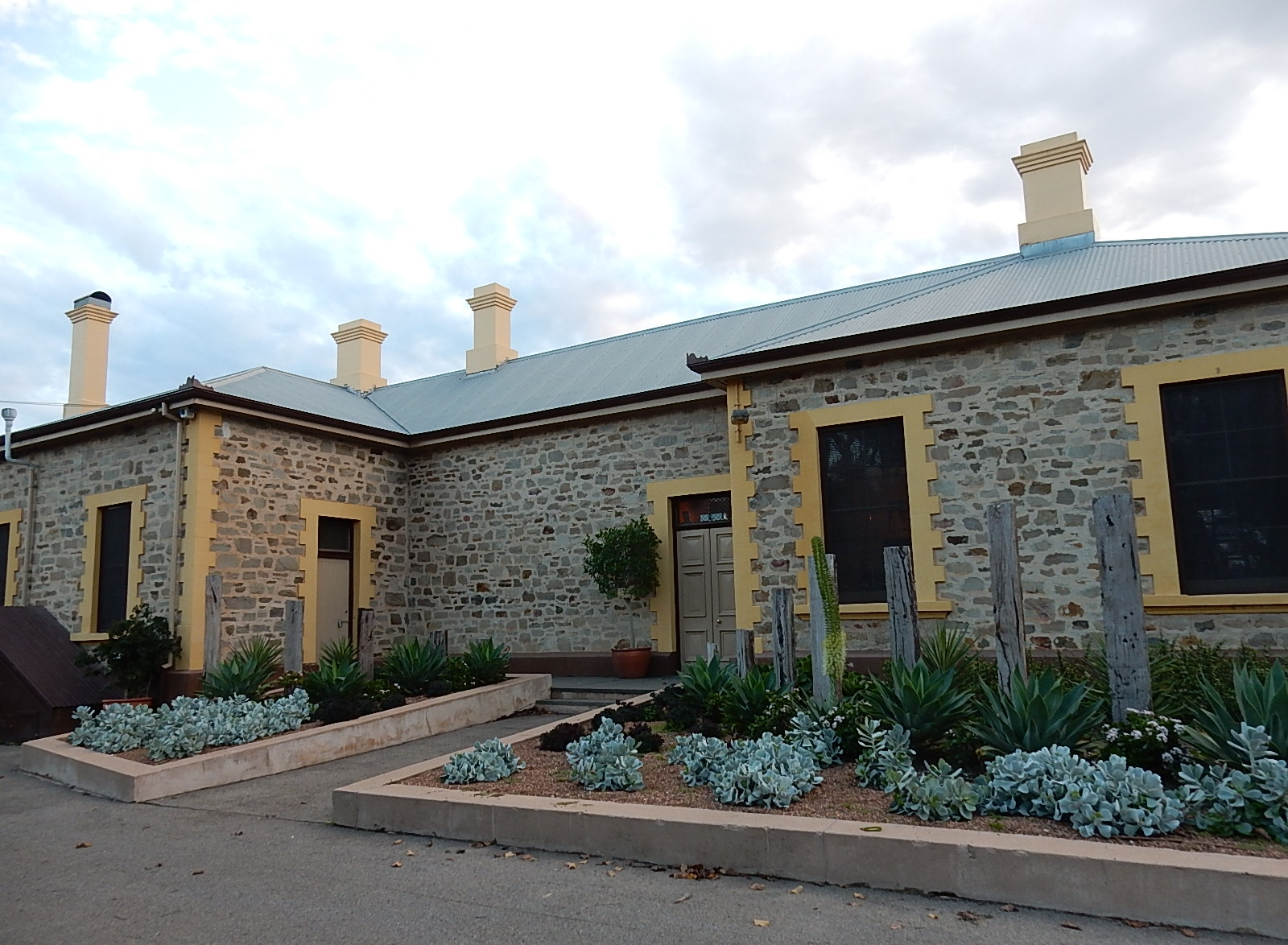
Front view, 2015
