= Mawson Lakes railway station =

Railway station in Adelaide, South Australia

Mawson Lakes
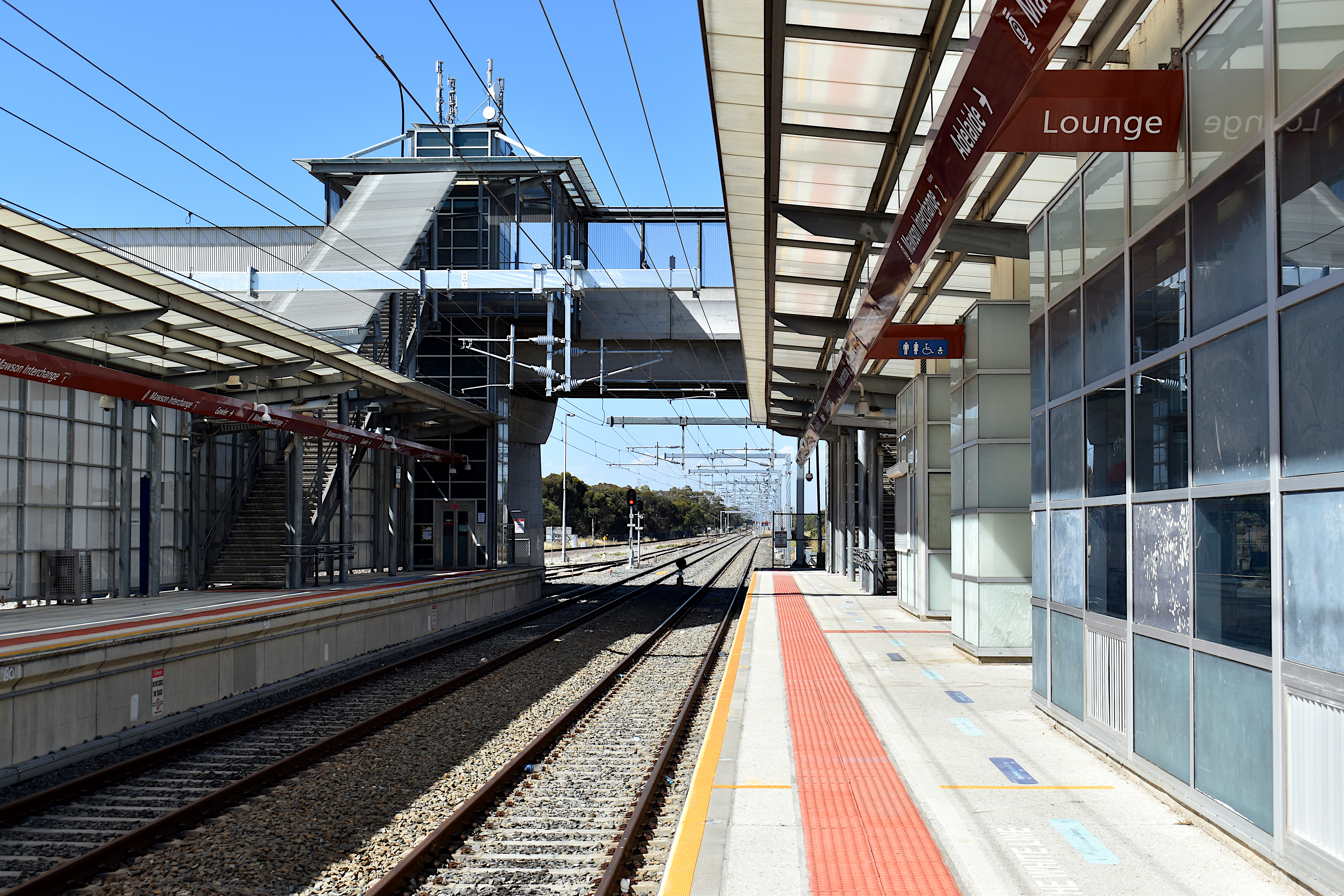
- North-east bound view from Platform 2, December 2021

General information
- Location: Mawson Connector, Mawson Lakes
- Coordinates: 34°48′13″S 138°36′45″E
- System: Railway station and bus interchange
- Owner: Department for Infrastructure & Transport
- Operator: Adelaide Metro
- Line: Gawler
- Distance: 14.3 km from Adelaide
- Platforms: 2
- Connections: Bus

Construction
- Structure type: Ground, 2 side platforms
- Parking: Yes

Other information
- Station code: 17533 (to City); 18543 (to Gawler Central)
- Website: Adelaide Metro

History
- Opened: 26 February 2006

Services
Preceding station	Adelaide Metro	Following station
Dry Creek towards Adelaide	Gawler line	Greenfields towards Gawler Central
Adelaide Terminus	Gawler line Super Express	Salisbury towards Gawler Central
Location

Mawson Lakes railway station, also signposted as Mawson Interchange, is a railway station and bus interchange in the Adelaide suburb of Mawson Lakes. It is located on the Gawler line, 14.3 kilometres (8.9 mi) north of Adelaide station. To the west of the station lies the Adelaide-Port Augusta railway line. The northern ends of the platforms are under the Elder Smith Road bridge with lifts and stairs from the footpath down to the platforms.

== History ==
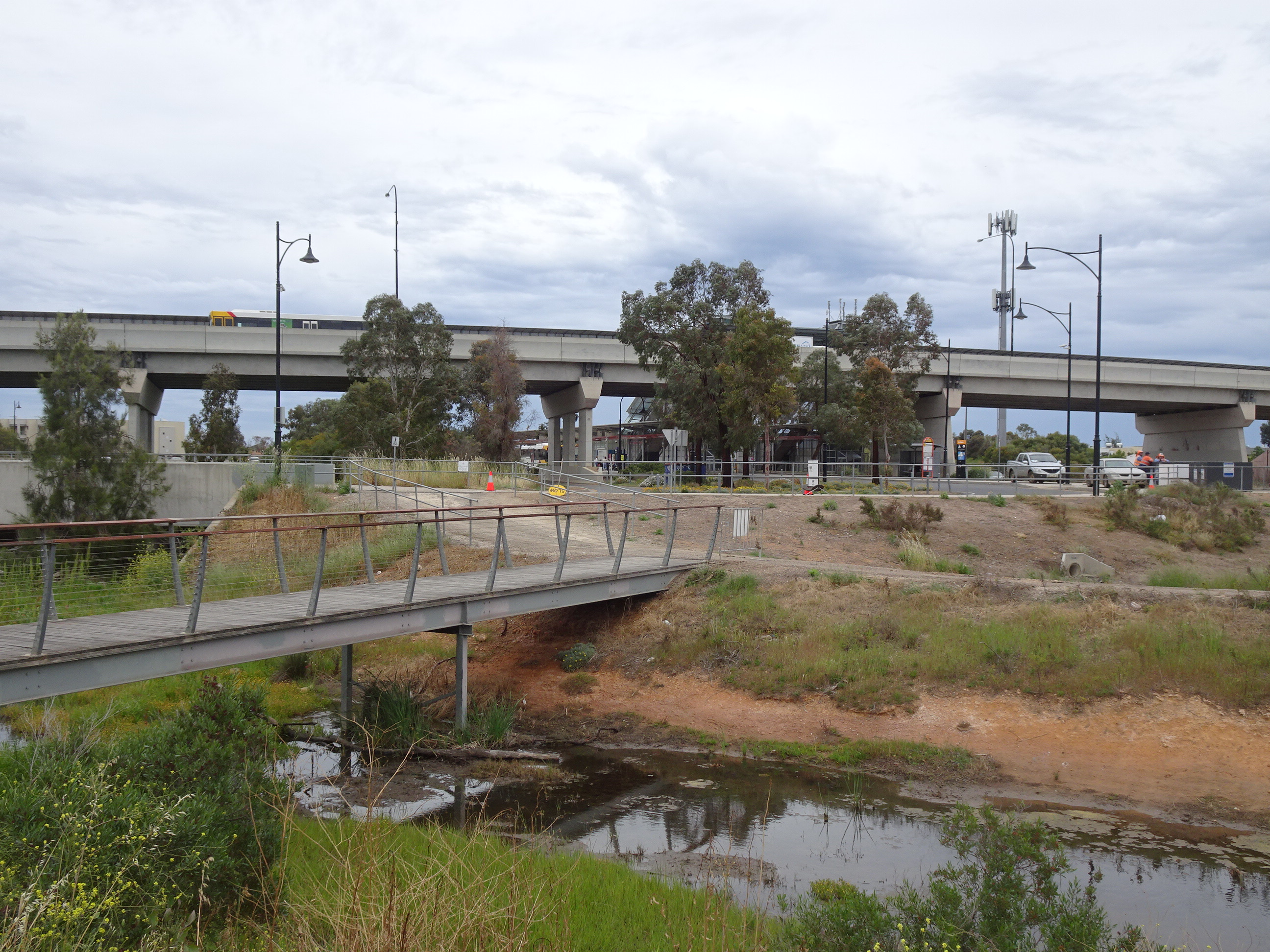
Elder Smith Road overpass over the station.

The station and bus interchange were constructed as part of the Mawson Connector project, which saw the construction of a new dual carriageway, now Elder Smith Road, through Mawson Lakes, and over the Gawler rail line. The $33 million Mawson Connector project was officially opened in March 2006, complete with approximately 100 carparks, a large bus interchange and a pedestrian overpass connected to the Elder Smith Road bridge. At the time, Mawson Lakes was the first new public transport interchange to be built in Adelaide in more than 15 years. In 2017, there were several calls for a multi-level carpark to be constructed on the site of the existing carpark, due to increasing passenger numbers, however, this never eventuated.

== Platforms and services ==
Mawson Lakes has two side platforms and is serviced by Adelaide Metro Gawler line services. It is a designated high-frequency station, with trains scheduled every 15 minutes on weekdays, between 7:30am and 6:30pm. Access to platform one for Gawler-bound services is via a pedestrian overpass on the Elder Smith Road bridge.

Platform	Destination
1	Gawler and Gawler Central
2	Adelaide

== Transport links ==
Bus transfers: Stop Mawson Interchange (Zone A)
Route no.	Destination & route details
501	to City via the O-Bahn
566	to Golden Grove Interchange

Bus transfers: Stop Mawson Interchange (Zone B)
Route no.	Destination & route details
224	Elizabeth Interchange to City
225	Salisbury Interchange to Gepps Cross

Bus transfers: Stop Mawson Interchange (Zone C)
Route no.	Destination & route details
411	to Ann Street, Salisbury
411B	to Salisbury Interchange
411U	to UniSA Mawson Lakes Campus

Bus transfers: Stop Mawson Interchange (Zone C)
Route no.	Destination & route details
222	to City
565	to Ingle Farm

== In popular culture ==
Mawson Interchange was featured in the 2022 A24 horror film, Talk to Me.
