= Gawler line =

Commuter railway line in Adelaide, South Australia

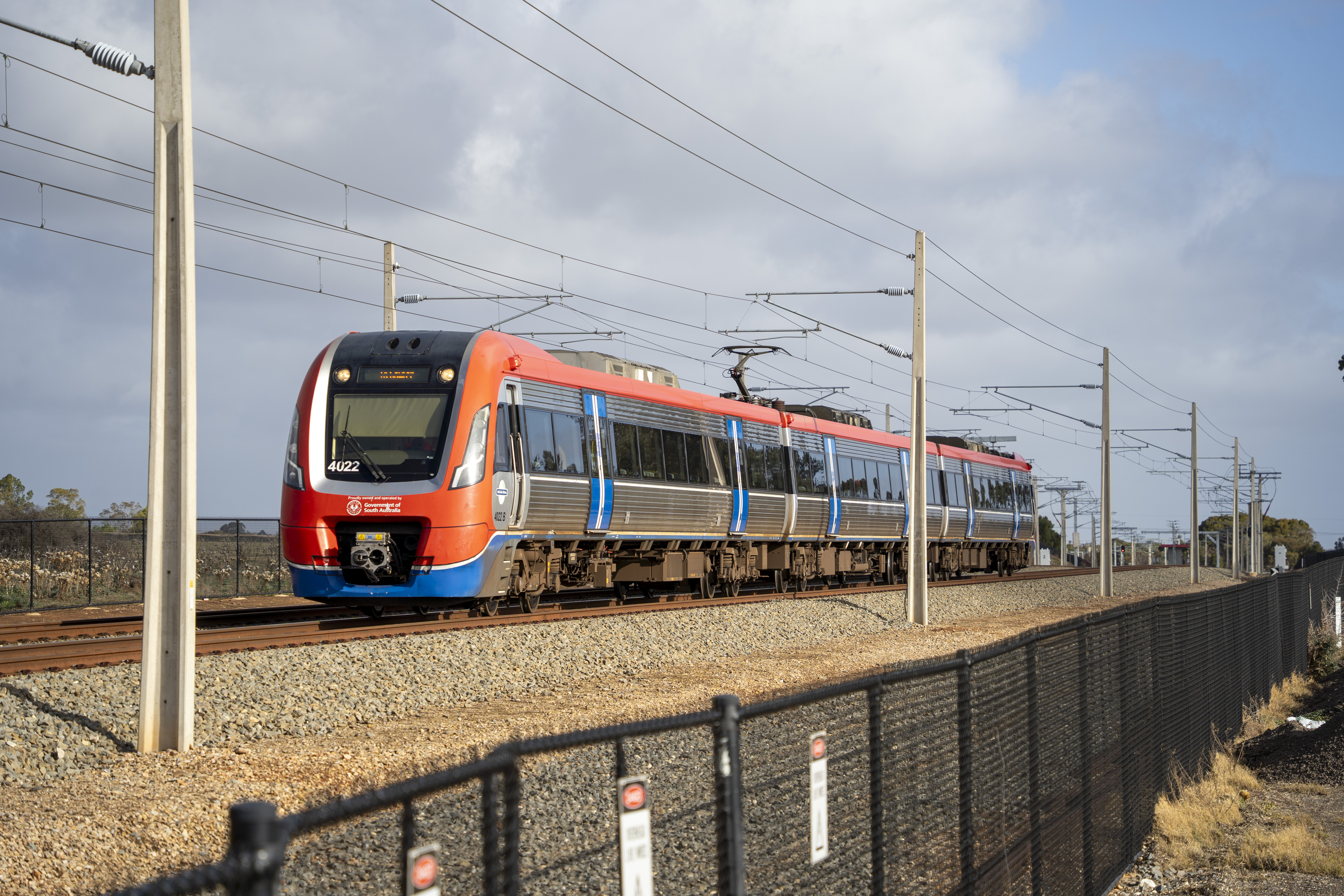
- Adelaide Metro 4000 class passing Kudla in June 2025

Overview
- Locale: Adelaide, South Australia
- Termini: Adelaide; Gawler Gawler Central
- Stations: 27

Service
- Type: Commuter rail
- Route number: GAW, GAWC, SALIS
- Operator: Adelaide Metro
- Rolling stock: 3000/3100 class (1987–2023); 4000 class (2022–)
- Daily ridership: 21,000

History
- Opened: 1857 (to Gawler); 1911 (to Gawler Central)
- Re-sleepered (concrete): June–September 2010 (to Mawson Interchange); September 2011 – March 2012 (to Gawler Central)
- Electrified: 2020–2022
- Closed: 24 December 2020
- Reopened: 12 June 2022

Technical
- Line length: 42.2 km (26.2 mi)
- Number of tracks: 2 (to Gawler); 1 (to Gawler Central)
- Track gauge: 1,600 mm (5 ft 3 in)
- Electrification: 25 kV 50 Hz AC from overhead catenary (2022–)
- Operating speed: Up to 110 kilometres per hour (68 mph)

The Gawler line (also known as the Gawler Central line) is a suburban commuter railway line in the city of Adelaide, South Australia. It is the most frequent and heavily-patronised line in the Adelaide rail network. It is also the only line to have no other interchange with another line, except for Adelaide station.

== History ==
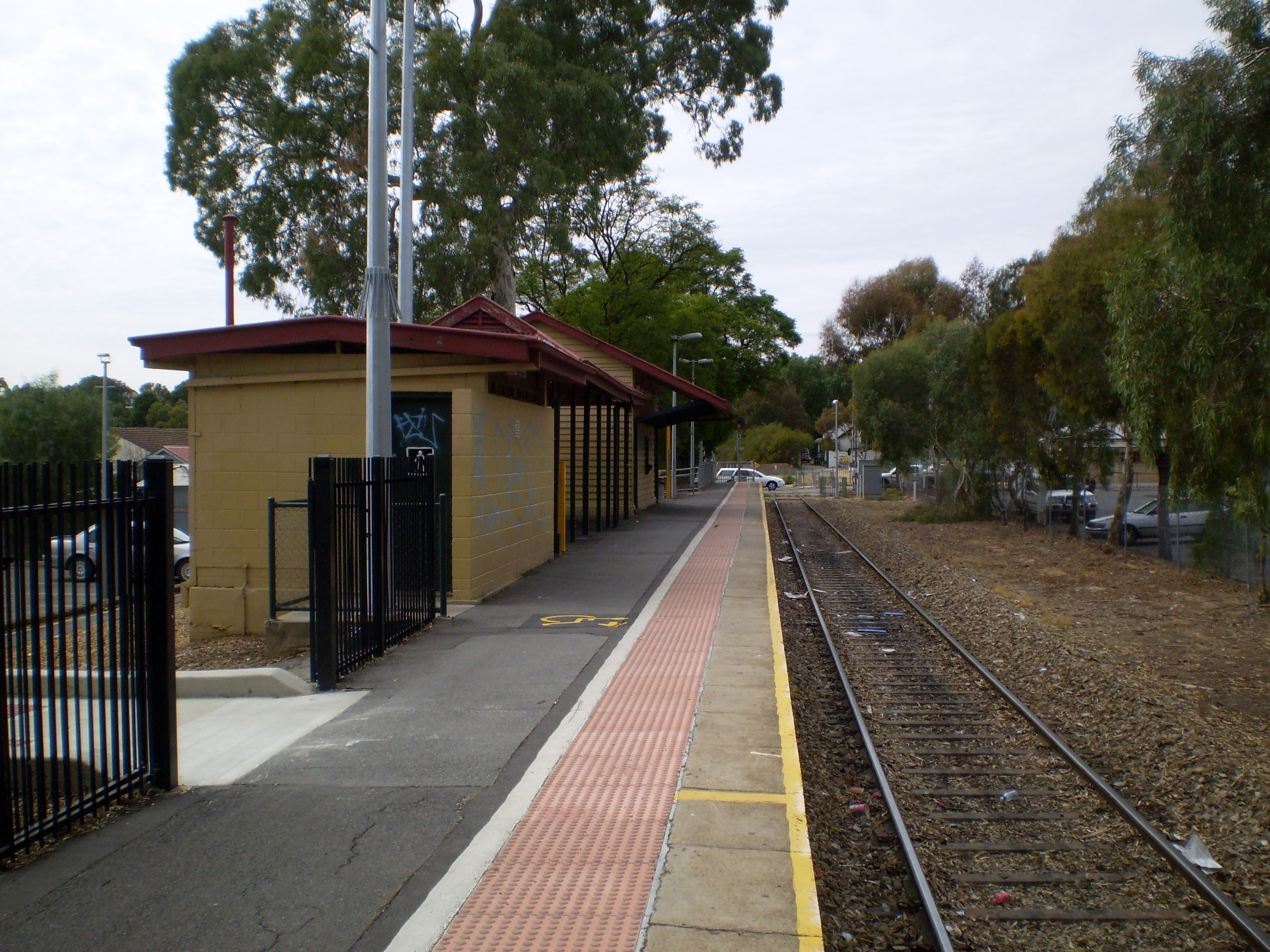
Gawler Central station, one of two terminus stations in the town of Gawler

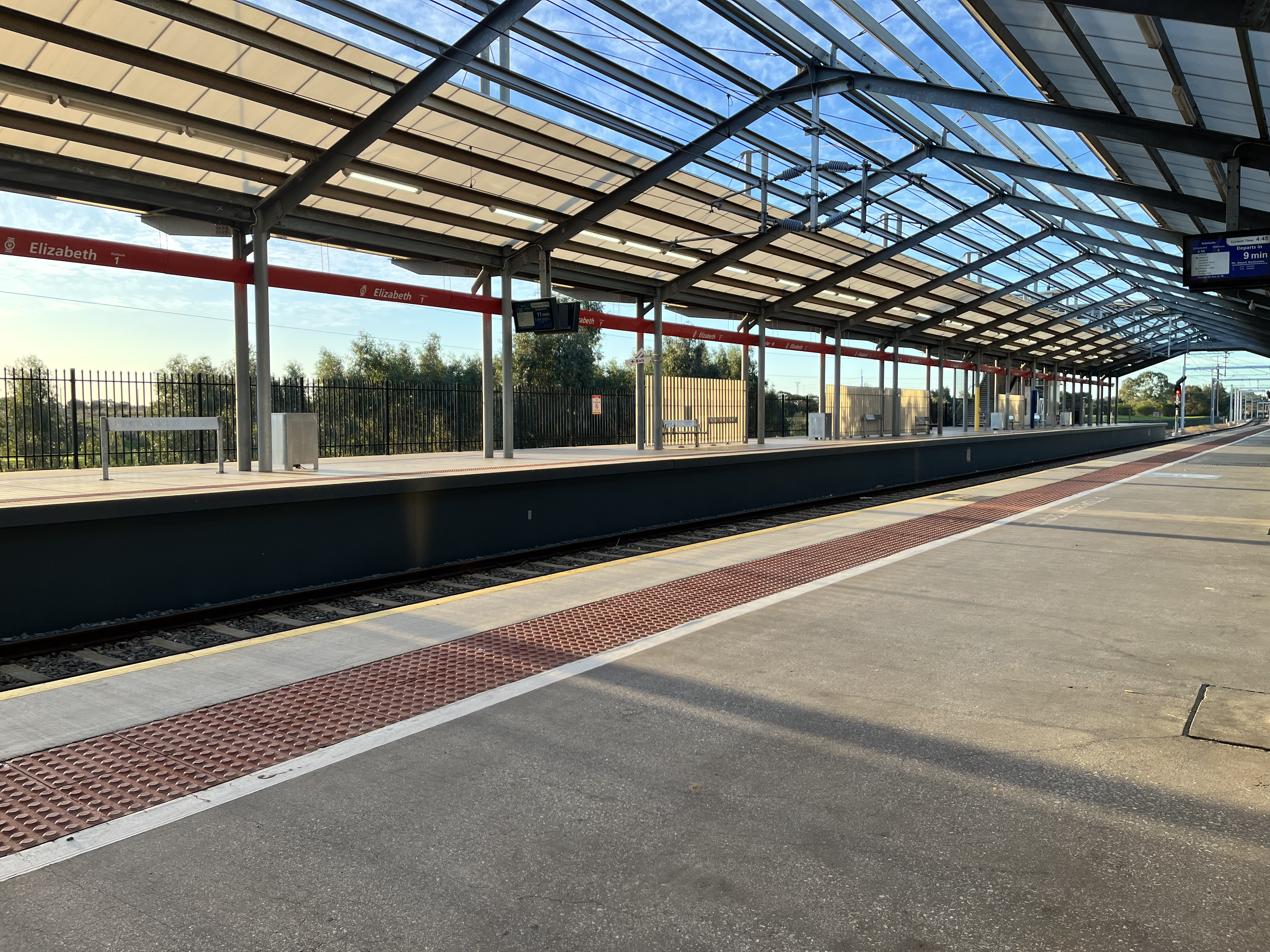
Elizabeth Interchange in 2023

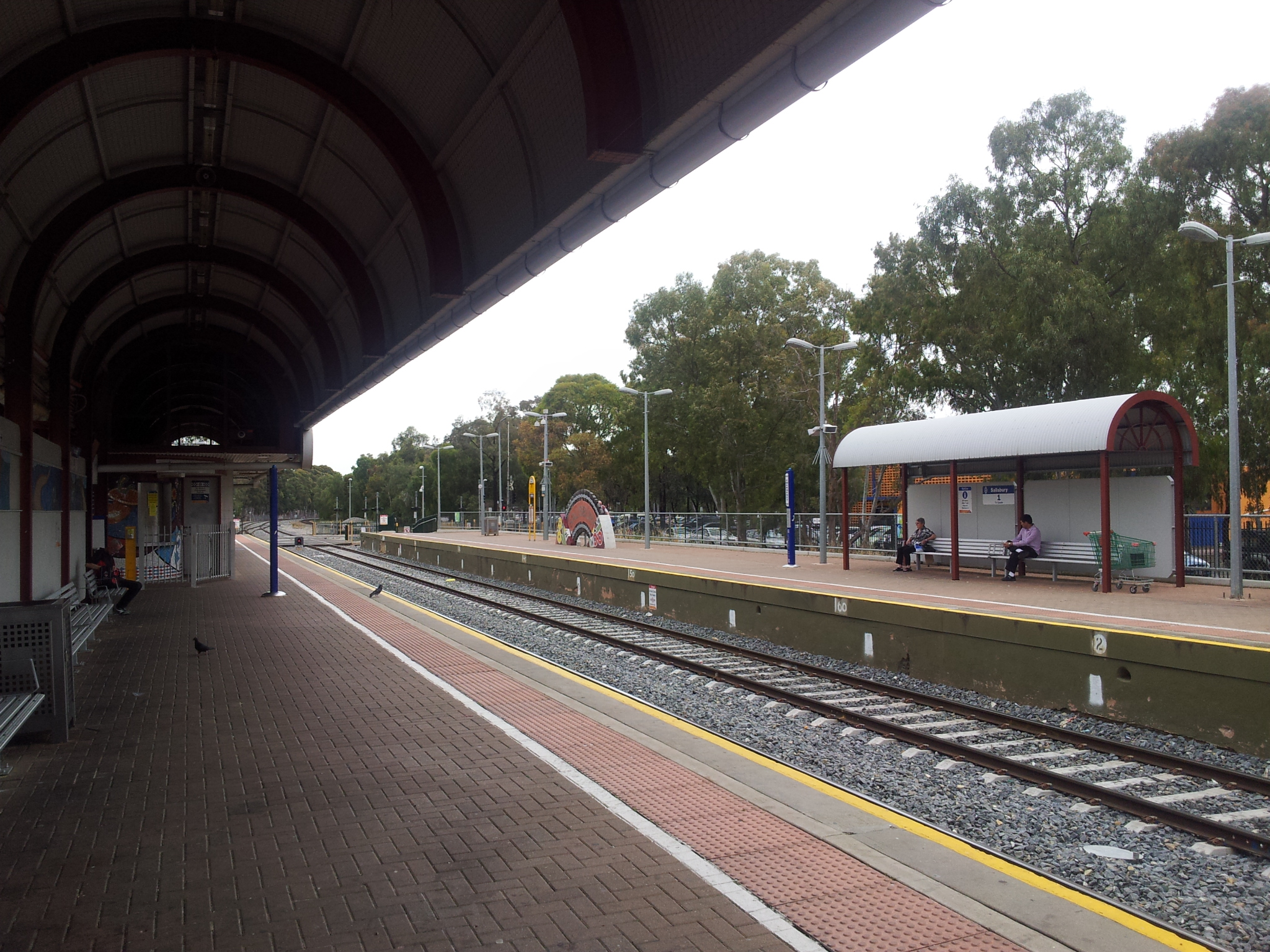
Salisbury Interchange in 2012

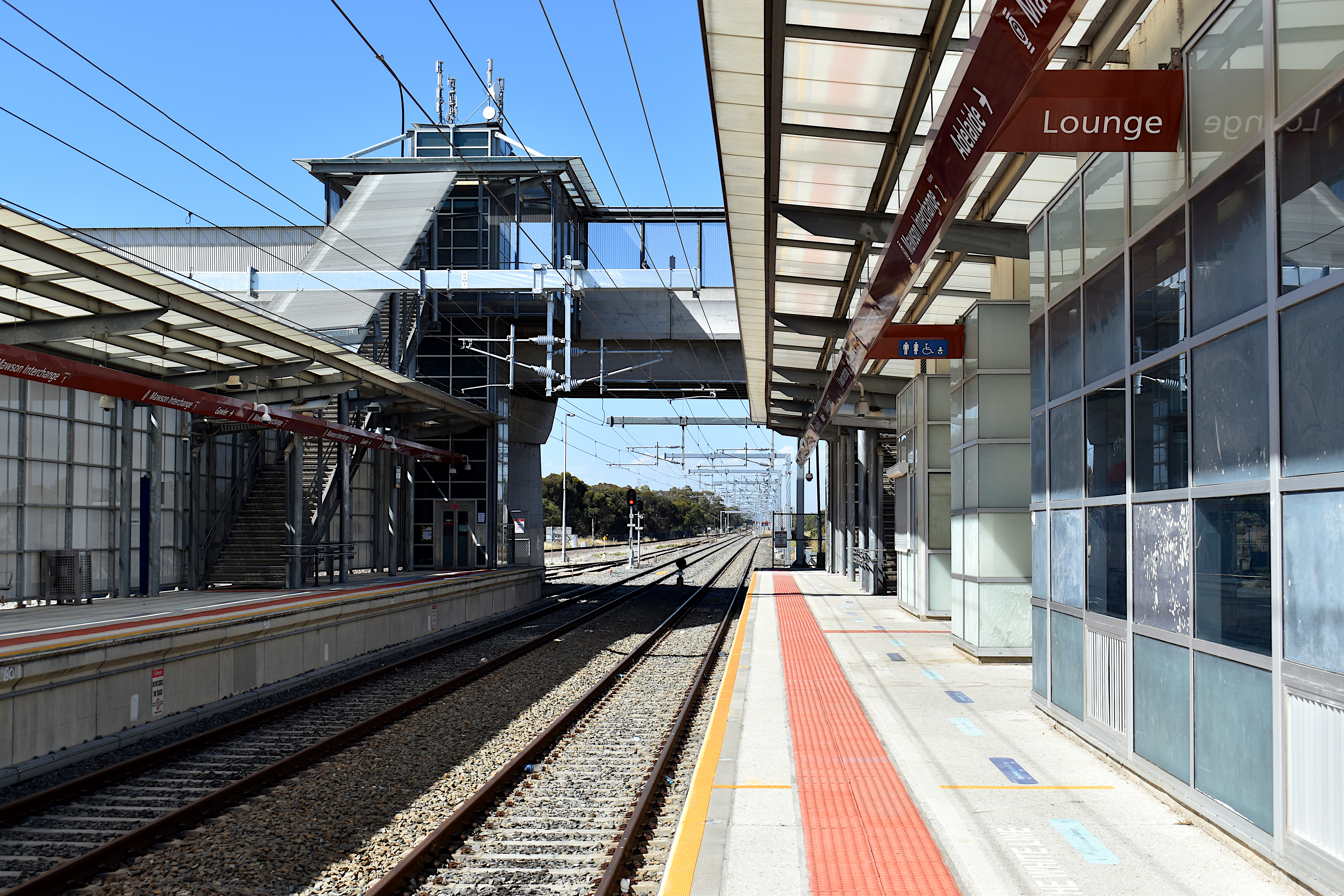
Mawson Interchange in 2021

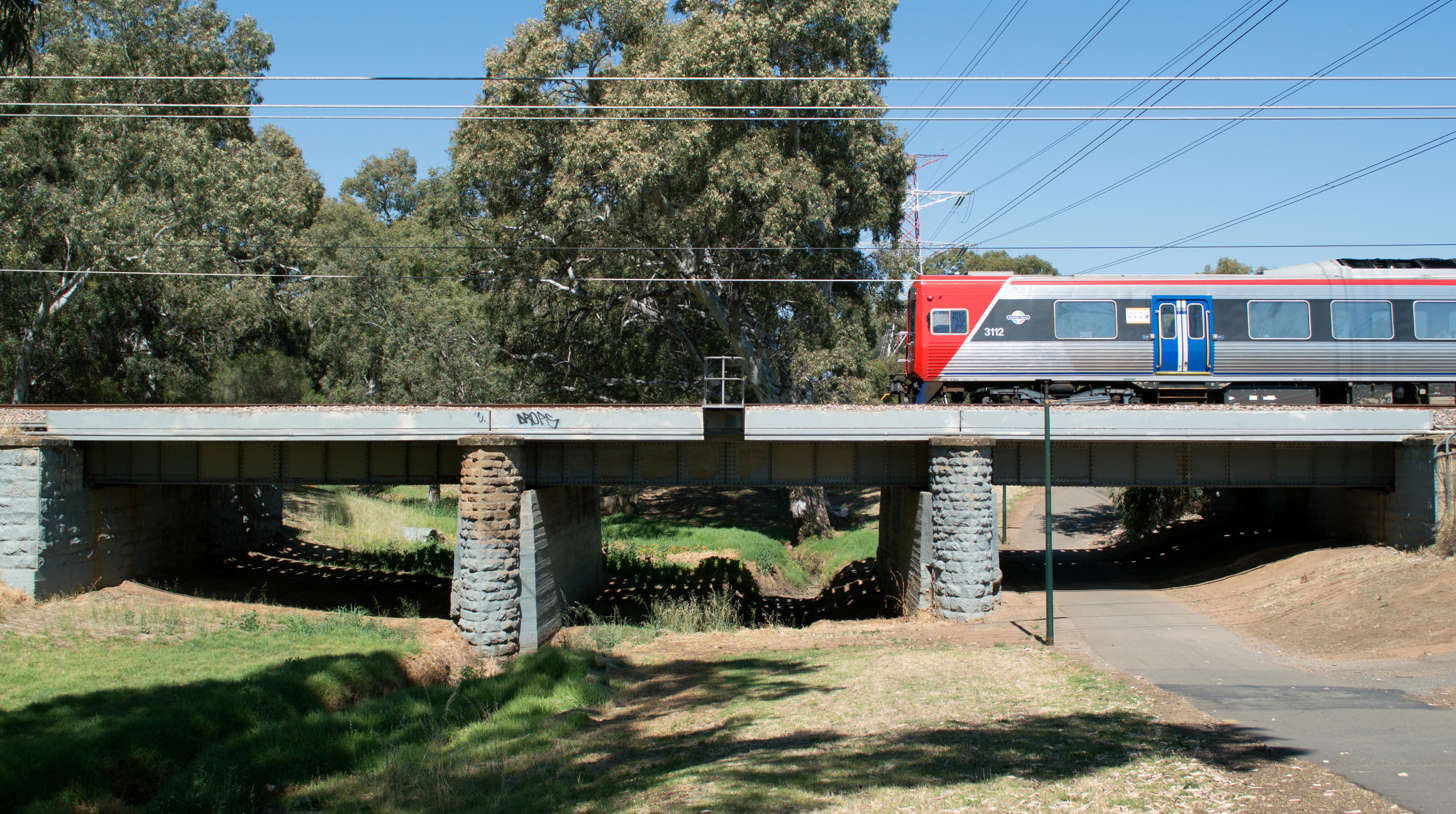
Rail Bridge over the Little Para River in Salisbury, built prior to 1889 and still in use

The line was opened in 1857 from Adelaide to Gawler. It was extended to Kapunda in 1860. Branches were later built from Gawler to termini in Angaston, Truro, Morgan, Robertstown, Peterborough, Spalding and Gladstone. Between Adelaide and Salisbury, the two broad gauge lines are paralleled by one standard gauge line on the Adelaide to Port Augusta line. A little north of Salisbury the standard gauge line heads north-west. From Salisbury to Gawler there are two broad gauge tracks, with a single broad gauge track north of Gawler.

=== Renewal and electrification ===
In 2008, the State Government announced a plan to rebuild the Gawler line, in preparation for the line to be electrified with the federal government also to provide funding. The track was removed, and the track bed, sleepers and track renewed. Dual gauge sleepers were laid to allow for the line to be converted to standard gauge at a future date. The line was closed between North Adelaide and Mawson Interchange for four months from June 2010 for this work to be performed, and between Mawson Interchange and Gawler Central stations for seven months from September 2011. Following the withdrawal of federal government funding by the then newly elected Abbott Liberal-National government, the electrification was postponed in October 2013.

In February 2011, a new Adelaide Metro railcar depot opened to the east of Dry Creek station, to replace the facility behind the new Royal Adelaide Hospital site and Adelaide station. The depot is the major maintenance and re-fuelling facility for the diesel train fleet, with capacity to store 70 railcars with over 11 kilometres of track. The depot has been designed to allow future conversion to support electric rolling stock.

To facilitate work on the Torrens Rail Junction in 2017, the Gawler line between Adelaide and Mawson Interchange was closed from 1–15 October and 18 November to 5 December.

Following a decade of on-again, off-again talks, electrification of the Gawler line was announced in 2018. The announcement only promised Stage 1 electrification as far as Salisbury with works anticipated to commence in 2018. A $220 million grant from the federal government allowed for Stage 2 electrification for the remainder of the line to proceed. Works began in November 2019 with completion anticipated in 2021. Contrary to the Seaford line electrification, which saw the line closed completely for 11 months, from October 2020 onward, main construction on the Gawler line was spread out across a rolling schedule of partial and full line closures across 12 months. Early works before October 2020 were spread across smaller closures, typically at nights and on weekends.

The entire line was closed in December 2020. It was intended to reopen in November 2021 but was delayed due to restrictions regarding the COVID-19 lockdown in July. The line was expected to reopen around 30 April 2022, but following the state election in March, the reopening was pushed back to the end of June.

The line was reopened on 12 June 2022. A majority of services on the line are now operated by 4000 class trains, however, 3000/3100 class trains continued to operate select services while the delivery of new 4000 class train sets continued until December 2023 when the last 4000 class set was delivered, effectively replacing the 3000 trains serving Adelaide's north.

==== Torrens Road Overpass ====
In 2021, the Australian and South Australian governments announced that the Torrens Road level crossing would be removed, at a cost of $196 million. The Torrens Road level crossing was previously identified as one of the most high risk crossings in Adelaide, in part due to it being both a passenger rail, and freight rail crossing. Earlier, in 2020, an investigation was launched after a freight train passed through the level crossing without activating the crossing boomgates.

In 2023, the Torrens Road overpass was officially opened. As part of the project, a new public park was constructed underneath the overpass, and the adjacent Ovingham railway station was rebuilt.

=== Possible extension ===
On 16 March 2025, South Australian Premier Peter Malinauskas announced that the corridor of the former Morgan railway line has been reserved for a possible future extension of the Gawler line to Roseworthy, along with a branch line to Concordia via the disused Barossa Valley railway line, which closed in 2014.

== Former branch lines ==
- Dry Creek-Port Adelaide railway line: opened 1868 (closed to passengers 1988, now freight only)
- Northfield railway line: opened 1857 (closed to passengers 1987, closed to remaining freight 1995)
- Port Pirie railway line: (closed to passengers 1991, now freight only)
- Penfield railway line: opened 1941 (closed 1991)
- GMH Elizabeth railway line: opened 1959 (closed 1992)

== Route ==
The line runs from Adelaide station north via Prospect, Mawson Lakes, Salisbury, Elizabeth and Smithfield to the town Gawler on the outer northern metropolitan fringe. The line is 42.2 kilometres (26.2 mi) in length and is the longest of the Adelaide suburban railway lines.

Like the rest of the Adelaide suburban passenger rail network, the line is 1,600 mm (5 ft 3 in) broad gauge for its entire length. The Australian Rail Track Corporation's standard gauge Adelaide to Port Augusta line runs parallel to the route from the Adelaide Gaol triangle to Salisbury, then turns north west towards Virginia.

=== Line guide ===
Gawler Line
Name	Distance from Adelaide	Year opened	Serving suburbs	Connections
Adelaide	0.0 km	1856	Adelaide	Belair Flinders Grange; Outer Harbor Port Dock Seaford Bus Tram
North Adelaide	2.5 km	1857	North Adelaide	
Ovingham	3.6 km	c. 1880	Ovingham, Renown Park	
Dudley Park	4.9 km	1915	Dudley Park, Prospect	
Islington	6.0 km	Unknown	Dudley Park, Prospect	
Kilburn	7.7 km	1915	Kilburn	
Dry Creek	10.6 km	1856	Dry Creek	
Mawson Interchange	14.3 km	2006	Mawson Lakes	Bus Interchange
Greenfields	15.1 km	1969	Parafield Gardens	
Parafield Gardens	16.6 km	1968	Parafield Gardens	
Parafield	17.7 km	1928	Parafield, Parafield Gardens	
Chidda	18.6 km	Unknown	Salisbury Downs, Salisbury South	
Salisbury	20.2 km	1856	Salisbury	Bus Interchange
Nurlutta	21.5 km	1950	Elizabeth South, Salisbury	
Elizabeth South	24.0 km	1955	Elizabeth South	
Elizabeth	25.8 km	1960	Elizabeth	Bus
Womma	27.3 km	1950	Edinburgh North, Elizabeth North	
Broadmeadows	28.2 km	c. 1950	Davoren Park, Elizabeth North	
Smithfield	30.2 km	1857	Smithfield	Bus Interchange
Munno Para	32.2 km	1978	Munno Para	Bus
Kudla	34.1 km	1959	Kudla	
Tambelin	37.4 km	1947	Evanston Gardens	
Evanston	38.3 km	Unknown	Evanston	
Gawler Racecourse	39.3 km	1913	Evanston	
Gawler	39.8 km	1857	Gawler South, Gawler West	Bus Regional Coach
Gawler Oval	41.4 km	Unknown	Gawler	
Gawler Central	42.2 km	1911	Gawler	

== Services ==
=== Commuter ===
All suburban rail passenger services are operated by Adelaide Metro. In April 2008, new timetables were introduced on the Gawler line in an effort to boost efficiency. Shorter secondary services that terminated at Dry Creek and Salisbury were withdrawn, new limited express services were introduced, and a new Hi-Frequency station policy adopted. Nearly all services either start or terminate their journey at Gawler or Gawler Central stations, apart from a morning peak express service that begins its journey at Salisbury.

Under this policy, the Hi-Frequency stations (Islington, Mawson Lakes, Parafield, Salisbury, Elizabeth, Smithfield, Tambelin and Gawler) have services every 15 minutes from Monday to Friday. All other stations have a 30-minute service, obtained by every other service skipping that station. This is in addition to several peak hour express services that stop only at selected Hi-Frequency stations.

On weekends and public holidays, services operate with a 30-minute frequency at all stations, with the exception of stations between Dry Creek and Adelaide, which are hourly instead.

Until April 2008, most services along the line were operated by 3000 class railcars. With the introduction of the new timetable, 2000 class railcars became more frequent, especially during peak hour. The 2000 class railcars were retired in August 2015.

=== Freight ===
Freight is a major factor along this transport corridor, with the Australian Rail Track Corporation's standard gauge Adelaide to Port Augusta line running parallel to the broad gauge track between Adelaide and Salisbury. Since 1984, this line has been standard gauge and had no interface with the suburban lines. Bowmans Rail, One Rail Australia, Pacific National, SCT Logistics, and Journey Beyond operate services via the line. Journey Beyond operates The Ghan and the Indian Pacific passenger trains along this section. Until 2007, grain trains operated from Roseworthy to Port Adelaide. The last freight service on the Gawler line was the Penrice Stone Train, which operated to Penrice until it ceased operating in June 2014.
