= Adelaide railway station =

Railway station in Adelaide, South Australia

Adelaide
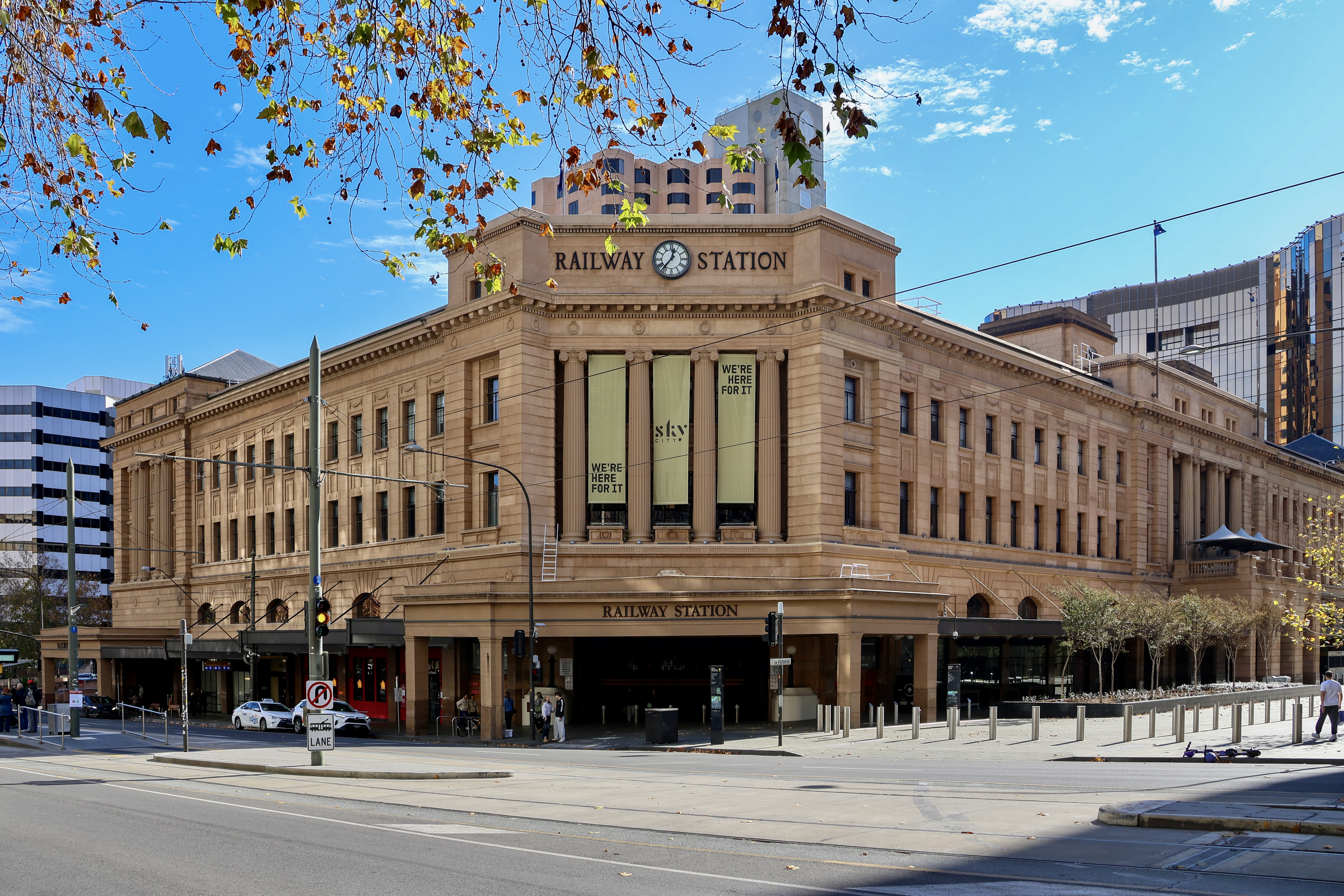
- Station's North Terrace building and entrance, June 2026

General information
- Location: North Terrace, Adelaide (Note: As per Google Maps and Williams (2014), many buildings on the northern side are not numbered. 121-125 are all on the southern side.)
- Coordinates: 34°55′16″S 138°35′47″E
- Owner: Department for Infrastructure & Transport
- Operator: Adelaide Metro
- Line: Belair Flinders Gawler Grange Outer Harbor Port Dock Seaford
- Platforms: 9 (4 island, 1 side)
- Tracks: 9
- Bus routes: G10, H1, INDB, ML2, T228, 98A, 98C, 190, 190B, 196, 222, 222R, 224F, 224X, 225F, 225X, 228, 228F, 228X, 229F, 229X, 251, 252, 254X, 263, 263A, 265, 265W, 281, 281K, 286, 286A, 287, 288, 288S
- Connections: Bus Tram

Construction
- Structure type: Underground
- Parking: Yes
- Accessible: Yes

Other information
- Station code: 16490
- Website: Adelaide Metro

History
- Opened: 19 April 1856
- Rebuilt: 1926-28; 1985-87

Services
Preceding station	Adelaide Metro	Following station
Terminus	Belair line	Mile End towards Belair
Terminus	Flinders line	Mile End towards Flinders
Terminus	Gawler line	North Adelaide or Ovingham towards Gawler Central
Terminus	Grange line	Bowden towards Grange
Terminus	Outer Harbor line	Bowden towards Osborne or Outer Harbor
Terminus	Port Dock line	Bowden towards Port Dock
Terminus	Seaford line	Mile End towards Seaford
Express services
Preceding station	Adelaide Metro	Following station
Terminus	Gawler line	Dry Creek towards Gawler Central
Terminus	Gawler line Super Express	Mawson Lakes towards Gawler Central
Terminus	Seaford line	Woodlands Park towards Seaford
Terminus	Outer Harbor line	Woodville towards Osborne or Outer Harbor
Services at adjacent tram station
Preceding station	Adelaide Metro	Following station
City West towards Royal Adelaide Hospital or Adelaide Entertainment Centre	Glenelg tram line	Rundle Mall towards Moseley Square
City West towards Royal Adelaide Hospital or Adelaide Entertainment Centre	Glenelg tram line	Art Gallery towards Botanic Gardens
Location

Adelaide railway station is the central terminus of the Adelaide Metro railway system. All lines approach the station from the west, and it is a terminal station with no through lines, with most of the traffic on the metropolitan network either departing or terminating here. It has nine below-ground platforms, all using broad gauge track. The station is located on the north side of North Terrace, west of Parliament House.

The Adelaide Casino occupies the majority of the station building, which no longer houses railway administrators. Adelaide station was also the terminus for regional and interstate passenger trains until their relocation to Keswick Terminal, now Adelaide Parklands Terminal, in 1984.

== History ==
=== Early growth ===
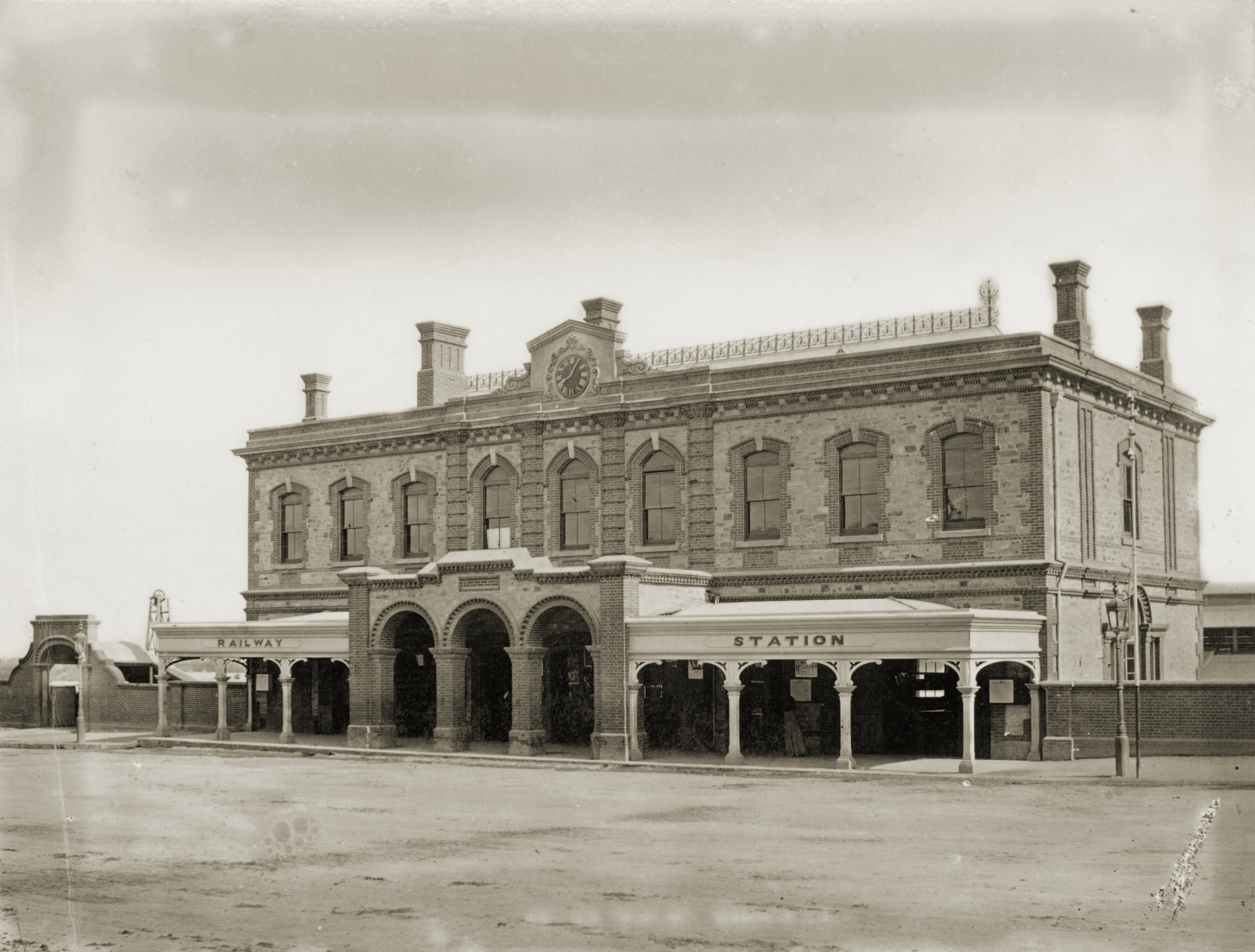
Adelaide railway station, built in 1856, after alterations made in 1878 when a second storey was added. It is a stone building with red brick dressings with a large arched portico and wide verandahs. A decorative wrought iron railing runs along the roof ridge.

Adelaide's first railway station opened on the current North Terrace site in 1856. It served the broad gauge line between Adelaide and Port Adelaide, which was the first government-owned and operated steam railway in the British Empire. The first passenger train departed from Adelaide station on 19 April 1856, carrying the Governor of South Australia and various dignitaries to a celebratory lunch at Port Adelaide. The original Adelaide station handled all passenger, freight and livestock traffic at the North Terrace site. Livestock was unloaded adjacent to the markets and abattoirs, which were opposite the Newmarket Hotel, on the corner of West Terrace. Workshops also occupied the site. By 1865, the station precinct had become crowded, covering an area of only 5.5 hectares (14 acres). In 1883, the workshops were replaced by new premises at Islington, 6 kilometres (3.7 miles) to the north.

The Port line opened for public service on 21 April 1856. It was single track, with intermediate stations at Bowden, Woodville and Alberton and terminated at the original Port Dock station (1856-1981). There were six trains per day in each direction, and two on Sundays. A second line opened to Smithfield (near Gawler) on 1 June 1857, the predecessor of today's Gawler line. This diverged from the Port line at a junction in the north parklands, and was extended to Kapunda in 1860, and Burra by 1870, both important copper mining towns in the early days of the colony.

The next line into the station was built by the Holdfast Bay Railway Company and opened on 24 May 1880. This branched off the main line where today's Belair and Seaford lines separate from the Outer Harbor and Gawler lines. It ran via Mile End and Plympton to Glenelg, and should not be confused with the other railway from South Terrace to Glenelg, which later became the Glenelg tram line. To cope with increasing traffic, interlocked signals and points were installed in 1875, and the Port line was upgraded to double track in 1881.

The South line through the Adelaide Hills was opened to Aldgate on 14 March 1883, and extended to Nairne (November 1883) and Bordertown (May 1886). The first through train between Adelaide and Melbourne, the Intercolonial Express, ran on 19 January 1887, and was the first intercapital rail journey in Australia without a change of trains at a break-of-gauge station.

=== Early 20th century ===
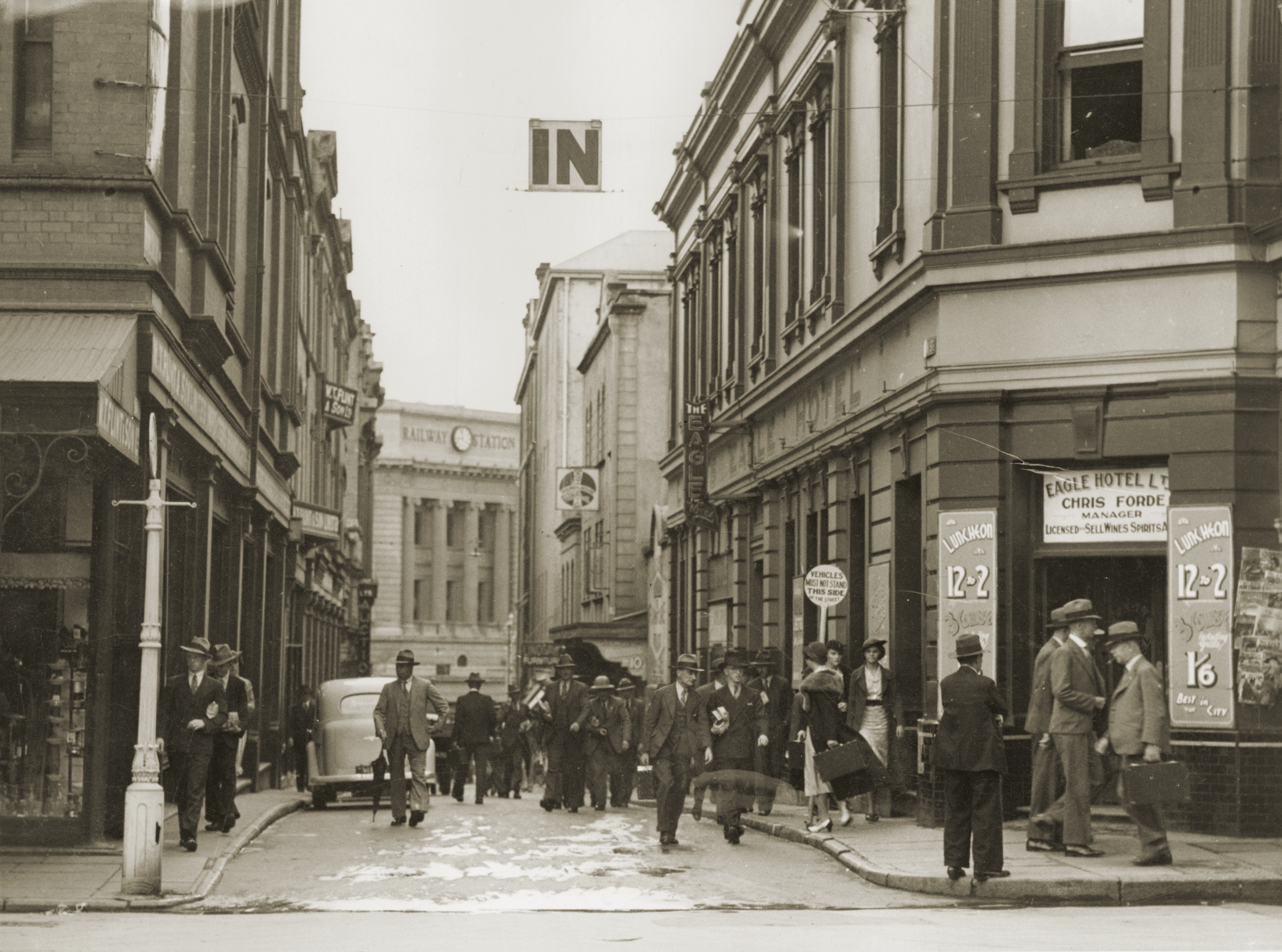
Looking down Bank Street towards the station main entrance from Hindley Street, 1937

With the basic framework of lines in place, the South Australian Railways continued building branch lines to promote settlement and agricultural development of the state's hinterland. Most of this expansion was complete by the early years of the 20th century and the resulting increase in traffic caused troublesome congestion in the vicinity of Adelaide station. In an attempt to cope with this, the original 1856 station buildings were demolished and replaced in 1900.

The South line was double tracked as far as Mitcham in 1908, and suburban trains ran to a new terminus at Clapham. The first section of the route that became the Seaford line opened from Goodwood Junction to Marino in 1913, and further extended to Willunga by 1918, this forming the Willunga line. On the north side of the city, a separate pair of tracks was built from the junction of the Port and North lines in the parklands through to Adelaide station yard, including a new bridge across the River Torrens.

In 1912, Mile End Goods Yard and engine sheds opened, and the Gaol Loop was built to allow freight trains to access the new yards at Mile End, bypassing Adelaide station. At the same time the livestock markets and abattoirs were relocated to Pooraka in the north of the metropolitan area, still countryside at the time. This allowed the area immediately around Adelaide station to concentrate on passenger and parcels traffic, and the old goods shed was then converted into a platform for Glenelg line trains. Adelaide station yard was also re-signalled in July 1915, using American-style three-position semaphore signals. This was the first installation of an electric signalling system in South Australia and was subsequently extended along the main lines of the South Australian Railways.

=== Webb era ===
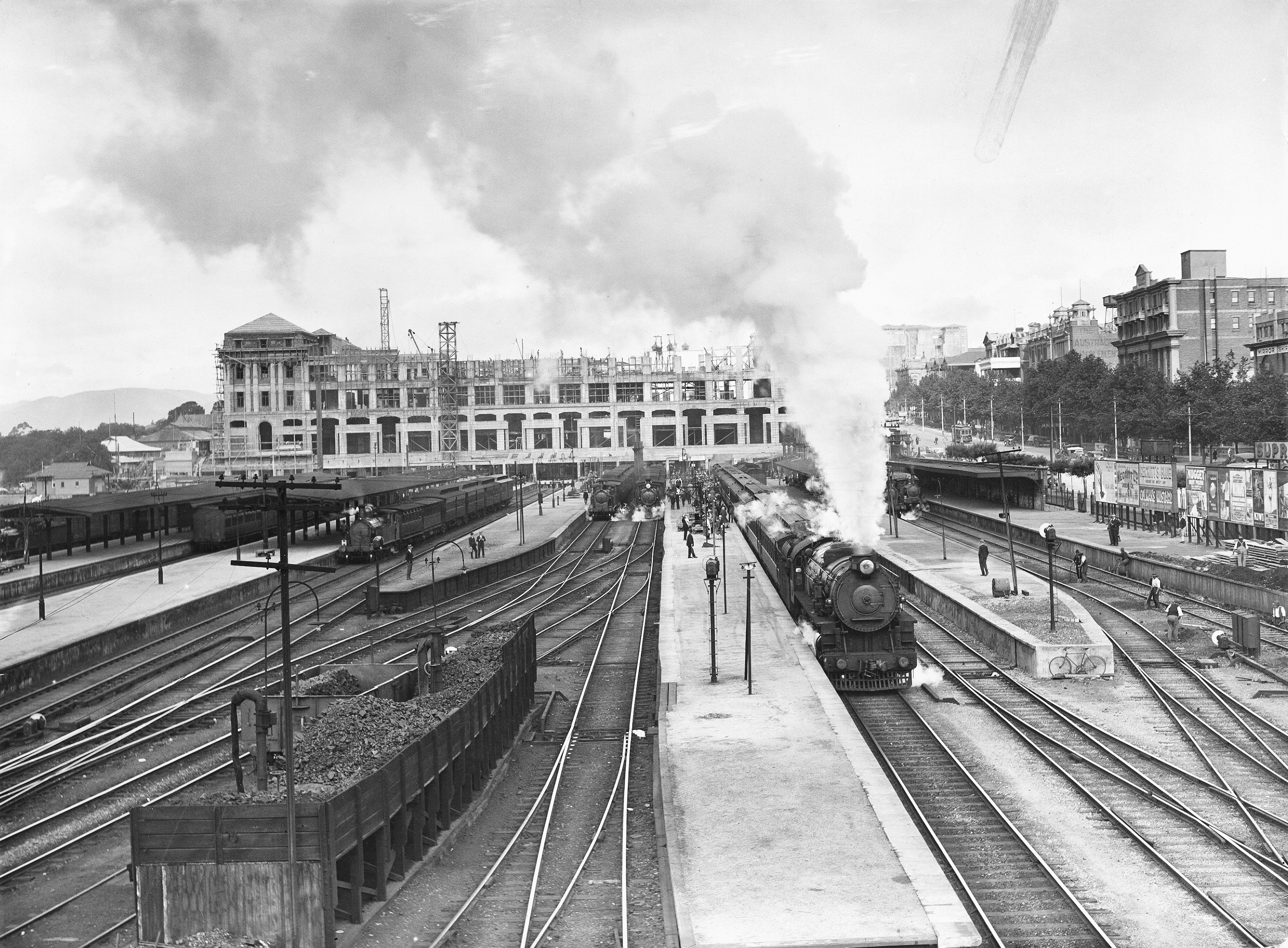
The new station during construction in 1927

The period from 1922 to 1930 was known as the Webb era on South Australian Railways. Under the leadership of a new Railways Commissioner, William Alfred Webb, South Australian Railways began a massive rehabilitation programme. Worn-out infrastructure, under-powered steam locomotives, undersized rolling stock and outdated operating systems were all modernised and upgraded along essentially American lines.

Among the many improvements that Webb championed, two of the best remembered are the introduction of new powerful steam locomotives and the rebuilding of Adelaide station. Nineteen designs were submitted and considered for the new station. The winner was a design proposed by local architecture firm Garlick & Jackson. The initial plan had forward-thinking provisions for extra platforms (which were never built) to serve Commonwealth Railways trains, on the assumption that its standard gauge line would be extended from Port Augusta and Port Pirie into Adelaide. The foundation stone of the new station building was laid on 24 August 1926, and the building was completed in 1928.

The new station comprised a massive sandstone building in neo-classical style. The upper three storeys housed the railways administration, which had previously been scattered in various buildings around the city. The concourse had many facilities to cater for long distance travellers as well as daily commuters - a dining room, hairdressers, and refreshment rooms. Of particular note was the enormous domed Marble Hall, which served as a grand and dignified main waiting room, and is now incorporated into the Adelaide Casino. The new station had 13 platforms, each covered by an individual canopy to alleviate the problems of smoke and fumes previously endured with an overall roof. The cost of the rebuilding greatly exceeded the original budget and the project became a source of great controversy within South Australia as the state came close to bankruptcy with the onset of the Great Depression.

=== Post World War II ===
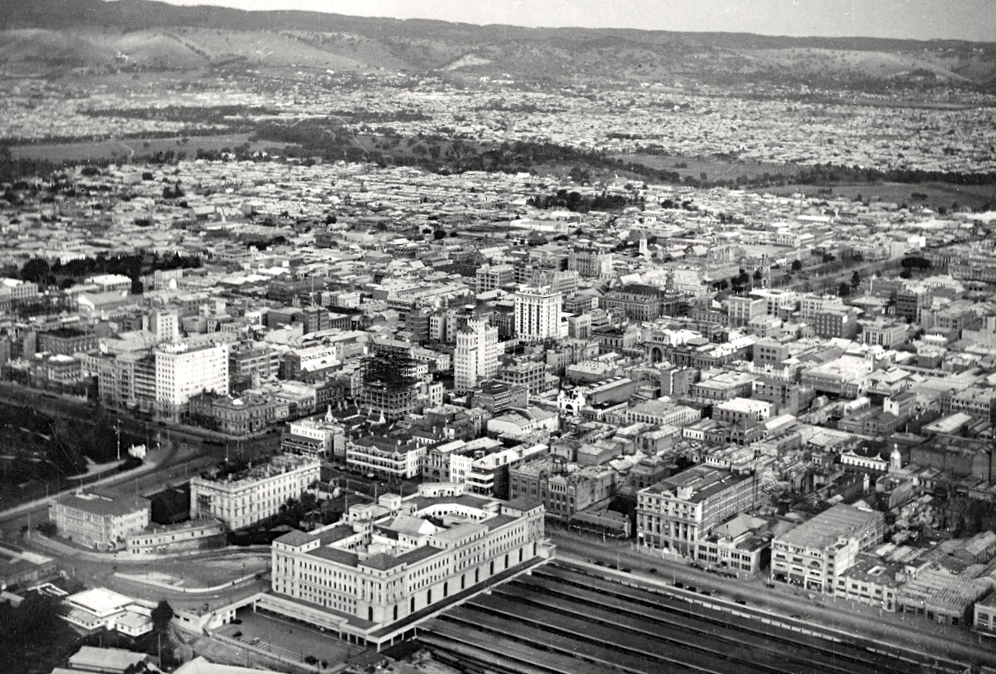
Adelaide railway station, the city centre, south-eastern suburbs and Adelaide Hills in 1935

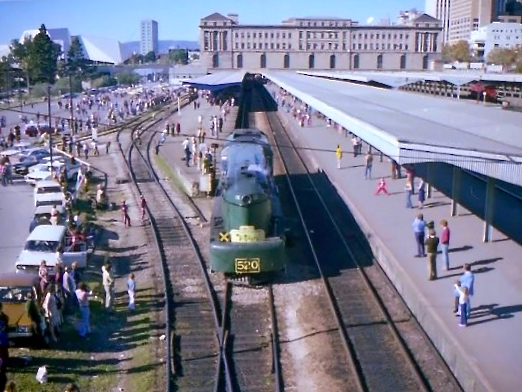
520 class steam locomotive Sir Malcolm Barclay-Harvey at Adelaide station on 21 May 1978

Patronage of country rail services declined through the 1950s and 60s as car ownership became more widespread. However, much of rural South Australia still retained daily passenger trains. Many of these services were operated by air-conditioned Bluebird Railcars, which had been introduced by the South Australian Railways from 1954 onwards. The following destinations were served from Adelaide in 1965:

- Bute / Kadina / Wallaroo / Moonta
- Port Pirie Junction (connection with Commonwealth Railways' Trans-Australian Railway line to Kalgoorlie)
- Hamley Bridge / Balaklava
- Blyth / Gladstone / Wilmington
- Riverton / Burra / Terowie (connection to Peterborough & Broken Hill)
- Kapunda / Eudunda / Robertstown
- Nuriootpa / Angaston / Truro
- Murray Bridge / Tailem Bend / Barmera / Loxton / Waikerie
- The Overland to Melbourne
- Naracoorte / Mount Gambier / Kingston SE
- Mount Barker / Strathalbyn / Victor Harbor / Milang
- Morphett Vale / McLaren Vale / Willunga

In March 1978, South Australia Railways was divided between two owners. The federal government owned Australian National (AN) took over ownership and operation of all country lines outside the Adelaide metropolitan area. The State Government owned State Transport Authority (STA) retained the suburban routes around Adelaide, including ownership and operation of Adelaide station. AN's longer distance trains continued to arrive and depart from Adelaide station for several years, paying an access charge to the STA, until AN's new Keswick Passenger Terminal (now known as Adelaide Parklands Terminal) opened on 18 May 1984, a kilometre or two west of the Adelaide city centre in an industrial suburb. Adelaide station is now served only by suburban trains.

=== Renewal ===
The years 1985 to 1987 saw the biggest change at Adelaide station since the rebuilding of the 1920s. The Adelaide Station and Environs Redevelopment (ASER) project involved:

- Refurbishment of much of the exterior of the heritage-listed station building and conversion of the interior to a casino (the main building had become underutilised as railway operations shrank and AN relocated its headquarters to Keswick).
- Construction of the Hyatt Regency hotel (now the InterContinental Adelaide) over the eastern part of the station site adjacent to the station building.
- Construction of the original Adelaide Convention Centre and the Riverside Centre office block over the central part of the station site.
- Construction of the Exhibition Hall (today Convention Centre Halls I, J, K) and basement carpark in place of the original Platforms 1-2.
- Partial relocation and reduction of platforms; Platforms 1-2 and 12-13 were demolished while 9 to 11 were rebuilt 80 metres (260 ft) shorter. The remaining Platforms 3 to 11 were renumbered, becoming Platforms 1 to 9.

The remaining platforms became partially underground and a special extraction system was needed to remove the exhaust fumes from the diesel railcars. Later expansion of the Adelaide Convention Centre fully enclosed the platforms beneath the centre's Central Building (opened 2001).

The track layout in the station yard was modified and resignalled in 1987/88, and operation of points and signals transferred to a new control centre overlooking the railcar depot and station. This resignalling resulted in closure of the two signal cabins that controlled movements in the station area; Adelaide Station Cabin (near Morphett Street bridge) was demolished, but the heritage-listed Wye Cabin today sits derelict at the divergence of the South and Port/North lines.

Adelaide's main railcar depot was located just outside the station at North Terrace. In 2008 it was announced that the depot would be moved to a new site at Dry Creek, freeing up the Adelaide site for the new Royal Adelaide Hospital. The Dry Creek depot opened in February 2011, and the City depot closed soon after. In January 2013, the station closed for a month-long shutdown in connection with the rail electrification of the Seaford railway line. A set of escalators was recently added to the southern entrance of the railway station and the adjoining staircase was refurbished, enabling the station to handle larger numbers of people. The train control centre was relocated to Dry Creek in 2018, from its former location adjacent to the old railcar depot.

On 28 February 2020, Renewal SA announced a revitalisation programme of the station building. In conjunction with the new northern entrance, the architectural features of the building would be restored and enhanced, the North Terrace frontage upgraded, and new food and retail tenancies added. Between August 2023 and January 2024, the pedestrian airbridge running over the concourse — constructed in the 1980s to provide a valet service between Adelaide Casino and the InterContinental, and obsolete since 2021 — was removed.

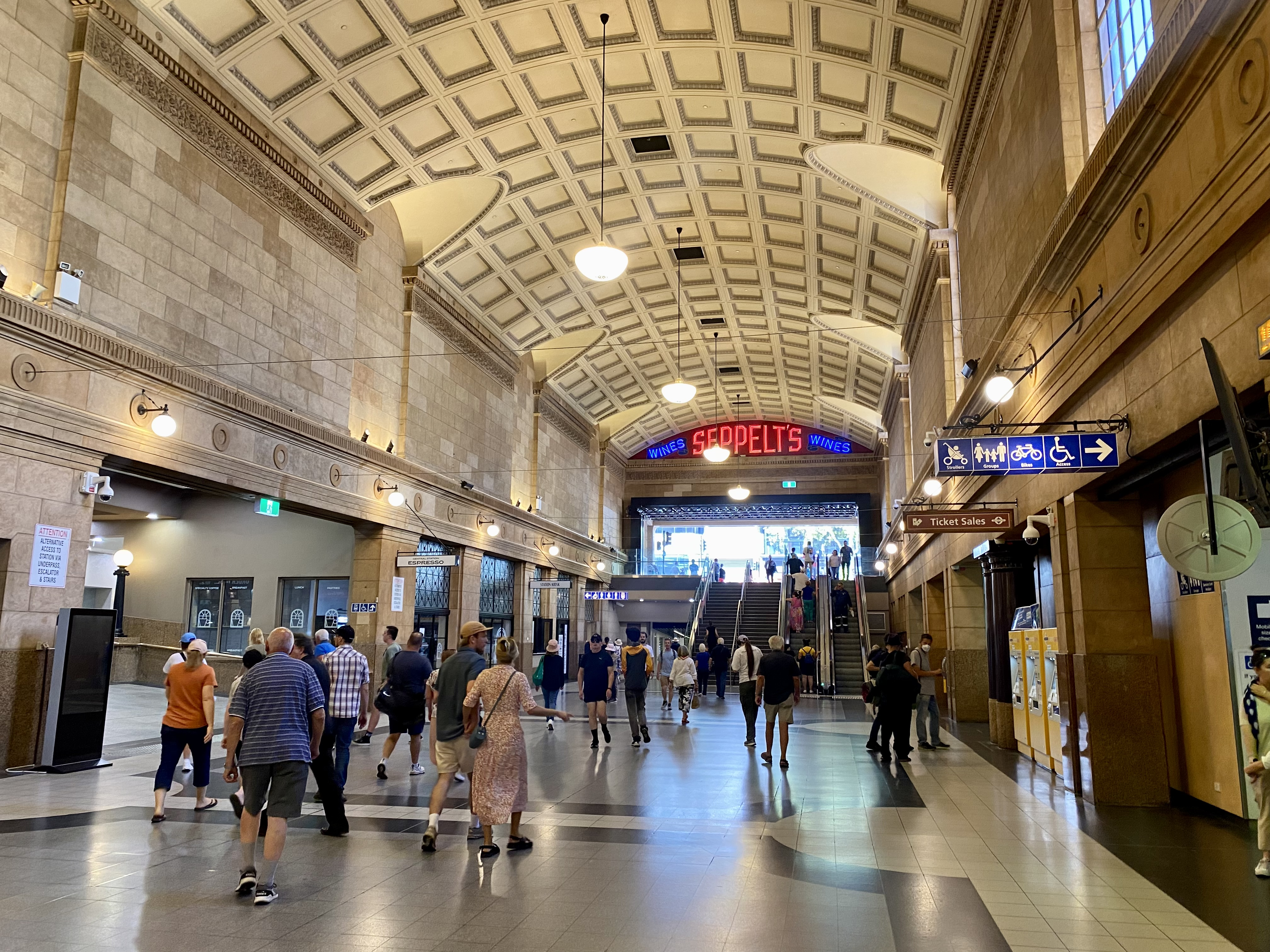
Adelaide railway station interior in 2023

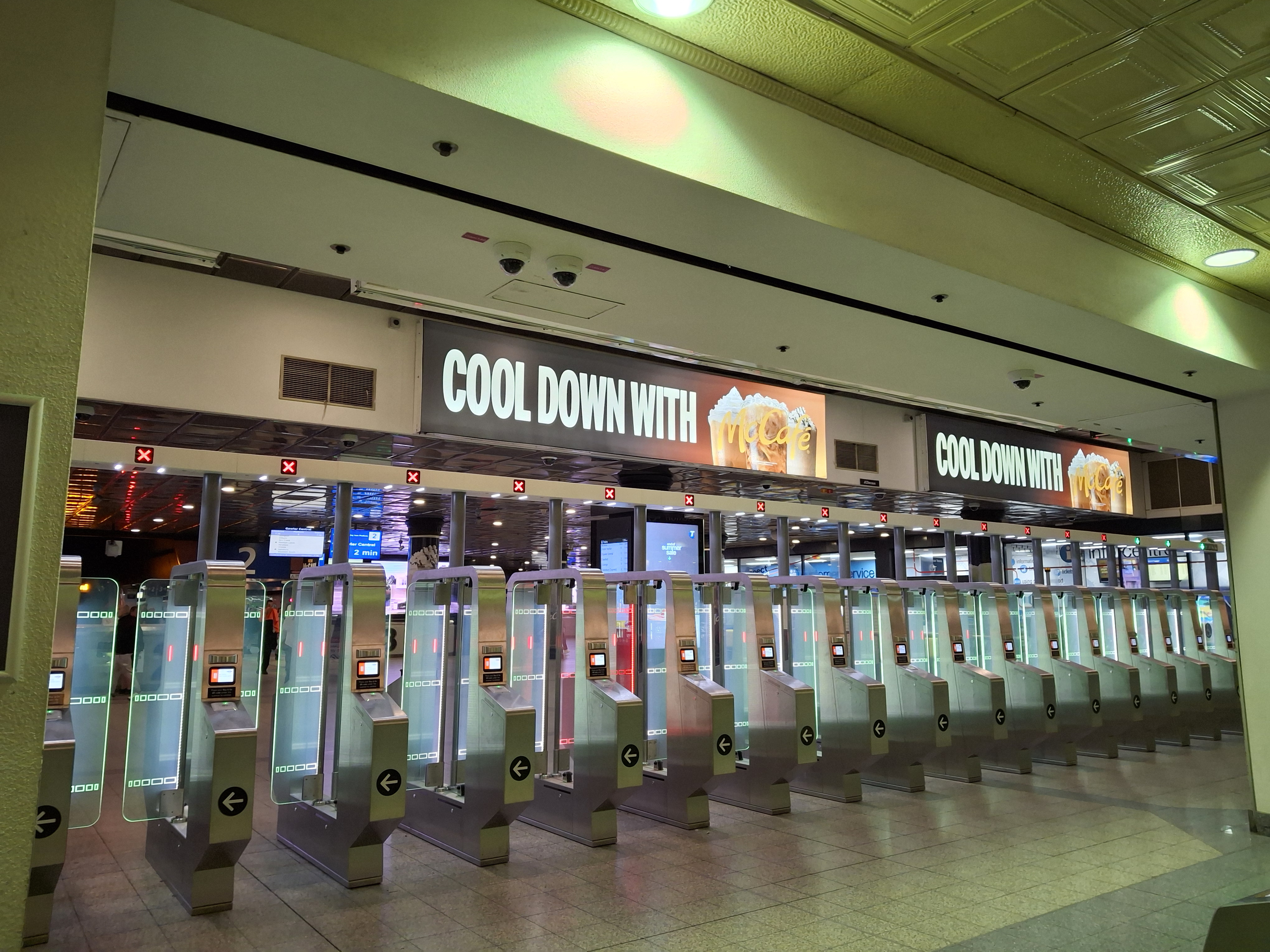
Ticket gates at Adelaide Railway Station

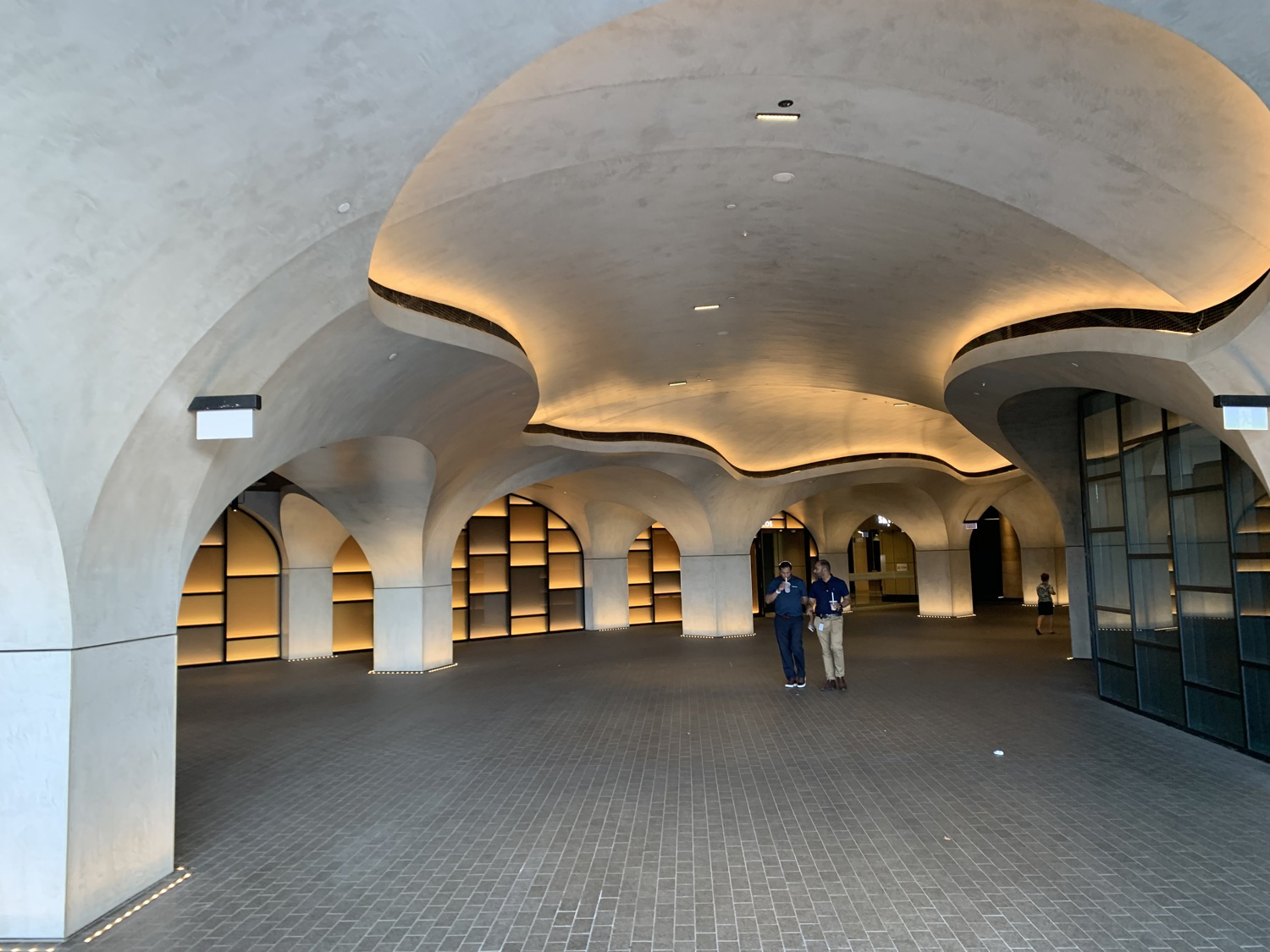
An entrance to Adelaide Railway Station

== Services by platform ==
Platform	Lines	Destinations	Via	Stopping patterns
1 to 3	Flinders	services to Noarlunga Centre and Flinders	Goodwood	All stations and limited express services.
1 to 3	Seaford	services to Seaford	Goodwood	All stations and limited express services.
4	Flinders	services to Noarlunga Centre and Flinders	Goodwood	All stations and limited express services.
4	Seaford	services to Seaford	Goodwood	All stations and limited express services.
4	Belair	services to Belair	Goodwood	All stations services.
5	Belair	services to Belair	Goodwood	All stations services.
5	Gawler	services to Gawler and Gawler Central	Salisbury	All stations and limited express services.
6 & 7	Gawler	services to Gawler and Gawler Central	Salisbury	All stations and limited express services.
8 & 9	Grange	services to Grange	Woodville	All stations services.
8 & 9	Outer Harbor	services to Osborne and Outer Harbor	Woodville	All stations and limited express services.
8 & 9	Port Dock	services to Port Dock	Woodville	All stations services.

Note: During peak times, trains are known to use alternate platforms.
