= Gawler Central railway station =

Railway station in Adelaide, South Australia

Gawler Central
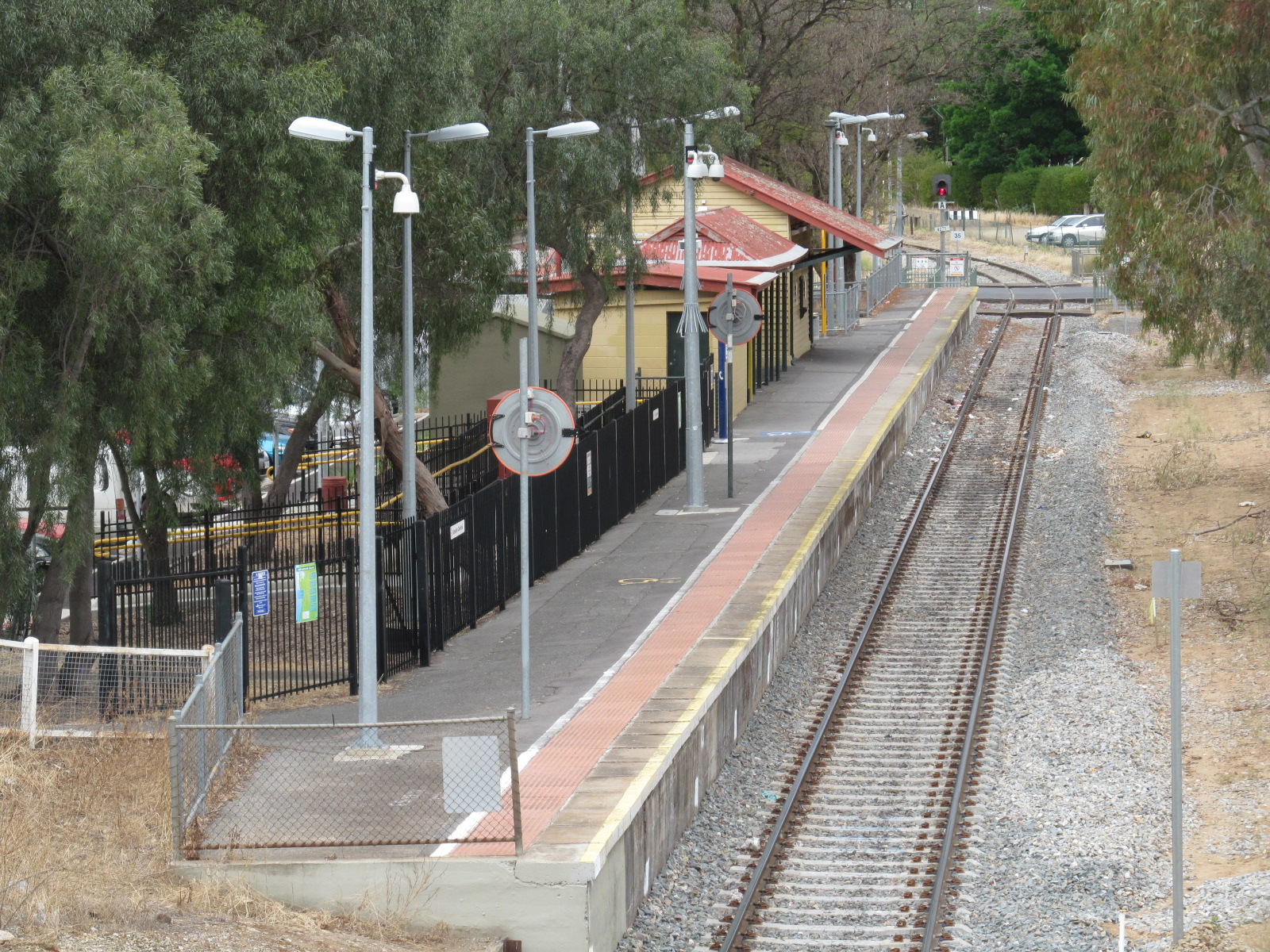
- Eastbound view of the station platform, viewed from the King Street overpass, October 2012

General information
- Location: Bridge Street North, Gawler
- Coordinates: 34°35′40″S 138°44′51″E
- Owner: Department for Infrastructure & Transport
- Operator: Adelaide Metro
- Line: Gawler Central
- Distance: 42.2 km from Adelaide
- Platforms: 1
- Tracks: 1
- Connections: Bus

Construction
- Structure type: Ground
- Parking: Yes
- Cycle facilities: Yes
- Accessible: Yes

Other information
- Station code: 16518 (to City)
- Website: Adelaide Metro

History
- Opened: 1911

Services
Preceding station	Adelaide Metro	Following station
Gawler Oval towards Adelaide	Gawler line	Terminus
Preceding station	Aurizon	Following station
Gawler Racecourse towards Adelaide	Angaston railway line	Kalbeeba towards Angaston
Location

Gawler Central railway station is the terminus station of the Gawler line. Situated in the South Australian town of Gawler, it is 42.2 kilometres (26.2 mi) from Adelaide station.

== History ==
The station opened in May 1911 as Willaston, being renamed North Gawler in September 1911, and Gawler Central on 12 February 1984. In the early 1920s, the South Australian Railways decided to extend suburban service to all stations within a 25-mile (40 km) radius of Adelaide station. North Gawler, which is located 26 miles 14 chains from Adelaide, was not included. From May 1911 until the 19th of June 1989, Willaston, Gawler North and eventually Gawler Central station had a station manager or staff member on site to sell tickets to passengers on the rail network.

Gawler Central is now the terminus of the line. It had previously continued as the Barossa Valley line. The last services on it were operated by Genesee & Wyoming Australia providing a daily Penrice Stone Train. This service ceased in June 2014.

On 25 December 2020, the station was closed along with the Gawler line for electrification. After many delays, electric train services began on 12 June 2022.<ref>Another Cost Blowout For Gawler Line Electrification</ref>

== Platforms and Services ==
Gawler Central features a single track and one side platform. Trains terminate and depart from Gawler Central every 30 minutes, seven days a week. On weekdays, this service is supported by additional trains terminating and departing from the nearby Gawler railway station, allowing for a 15 minute frequency at designated high-frequency stations along the Gawler line.

Platform	Destination
1	Adelaide

== Transport Links ==
Bus transfers: Stop 102 Murray St
Route no.	Destination & route details
491	Willaston & Hewett Loop via Gawler station, Murray St, Osprey Pde and Gawler Town Centre
