= Downer Group =

Integrated services company active in Australia and New Zealand

Downer EDI Limited
- Type: Public
- Traded as: ASX: DOW
- Industry: Civil engineering
- Founded: 1933
- Founder: Arnold Downer
- Headquarters: Sydney, Australia
- Key people: Peter Tompkins, CEO and Managing Director
- Services: Integrated services
- Operating income: $10.9 billion (June 2025)
- Number of employees: 26,000 (June 2025)
- Divisions: Transport and Infrastructure; Energy and Utilities; Spotless; New Zealand
- Subsidiaries: Downer Rail; Spotless Group Holdings (88%)
- Website: www.downergroup.com

Downer Group is an integrated services company active in Australia and New Zealand listed on the Australian Securities Exchange and New Zealand Stock Exchange

Downer Group employs approximately 26,000 people across more than 200 sites, primarily in Australia and New Zealand, but also in the Asia-Pacific region, South America and southern Africa.

== History ==
Downer's foundations were laid in the 19th century, when Walkers Limited and Clyde Engineering were founded in Australia, and the Public Works Department and Electrical Telegraph Department were founded in New Zealand. They merged in the 20th century to form parts of the Downer Group. The 20th century also saw the purchase of companies that now make up Downer's core divisions: railway manufacturer Evans Deakin & Company (EDI) and mining contractor Roche Brothers.

In 1933, the Downer Group was founded in New Zealand by Arnold Downer, as Downer & Co, focusing on providing engineering and construction services to the public and private infrastructure sectors in New Zealand, including the New Zealand Public Works Department. In 1954, Downer & Co merged with William Cable Holdings and, in 1964, with A&G Price, to form Cable Price Downer.

In 1994, Downer merged with Hong Kong-based Paul YITC. In 1996, the company purchased Works Corporation, the state-owned enterprise civil construction arm of the New Zealand Ministry of Works & Development. In 1997, mining contractor Roche Brothers was acquired. In 1998, Downer purchased major roads contractor Technic Group, and was first listed on the Australian Securities Exchange.

In 2000, road-sealing business Bitumix was acquired from BP. In 2001, Downer merged with Evans Deakin Industries to form Downer EDI. Between 2003 and 2008, Downer also acquired Stork, QCC, Snowden, Emoleum and Excell Corporation. In October 2014, the construction assets of Tenix were acquired.

In March 2017, Downer acquired Hawkins, one of New Zealand's largest builders, and in June 2017, took majority ownership of Spotless Group Holdings through a hostile takeover. It took full ownership of Spotless for $1.27 billion in October 2020. The Spotless acquisition was the largest in Downer's history.

== Major projects ==
Projects undertaken by the company have included:

- Homer Tunnel (1935–1940)
- Rimutaka Tunnel in partnership with Morrison-Knudsen (1951–1955)
- Cook Strait Ferry Terminal for passenger and freight operations (1960)
- Lower Nihotupu Reservoir (1948)
- Lower Wairarapa Valley flood prevention scheme (1964–1984)
- New Plymouth Power Station (1972)
- City Rail Link, Auckland (started 2016)
- Christmas Creek mine (2010–2016)
- Gorgon gas project (2014–2017)
- Wheatstone (2014–2017)
- Carrapateena mine
- Gruyere Gold Project
- Meandu Mine operations
- Ross River solar farm
- Clare solar farm
- Australia's National Broadband Network; FttC, FttN, HFC
- High Capacity Metro Trains (HCMT) with CRRC Changchun Railway Vehicles
- Sydney Growth Trains (SGT) with CRRC Changchun Railway Vehicles
- Maintenance of Sydney Trains' Millennium passenger fleet
- Newcastle Light Rail

== Operations ==
Downer reports its financial results under five service lines: Transport; Utilities; Facilities; Engineering, Construction and Maintenance (EC&M); and Mining.

=== Rail/Bus ===
Downer Rail was formed in March 2001 as EDI Rail following the purchase of Evans Deakin Industries by Downer Group. Evans Deakin operated the former Clyde Engineering plants at Kelso and Somerton and Walkers Limited, Maryborough plant. It reopened the former Cardiff Locomotive Workshops to build CityRail M sets. In July 2007 it was renamed Downer Rail.

In 2008 Locomotive Demand Power was established as a subsidiary to lease locomotives. In November 2009 Downer Rail became a tram operator through its 49% shareholding in Keolis Downer that operated the Yarra Trams franchise in Melbourne. In July 2014, Keolis Downer commenced operating the G:link light rail line on the Gold Coast.

In March 2015, Keolis Downer purchased bus operator Australian Transit Enterprises which operates the Hornibrook Bus Lines, LinkSA, Path Transit and SouthLink operations with 930 buses. In July 2017, Keolis Downer commenced operating bus and ferry services in Newcastle under the Newcastle Transport brand.

In July 2025, Keolis agreed terms to purchase Downer Group's 49% stake in Keolis Downer. It was completed in December 2025 with the joint venture rebranded to Keolis Australia.

=== Transport ===
Transport comprises Downer's road services, infrastructure projects, and rail & transit systems businesses. It conducts transport infrastructure services that include earthworks, civil construction, asset management, maintenance, surfacing and stabilisation, supply of bituminous products and logistics, open space and facilities management and rail track signalling and electrification works. In June 2023, Downer Group sold the transport projects business to Gamuda who rebranded it DT Infrastructure.

=== Utilities ===
The Utilities service line provides services to customers across the power and gas, water, communications and renewables sectors. Downer designs, builds, operates and maintains steel lattice transmission towers, electricity and gas networks, wastewater treatment plants, water assets, wind farms, solar farms and telecommunication networks such as the NBN.

=== Facilities ===
The Facilities services line operates in Australia and New Zealand delivering facilities services to customers across a range of industry sectors including: defence, education, health government and hospitality. Facilities businesses include Spotless, AE Smith, Alliance, Ensign, EPICURE, Mustard, Nuvo, Taylors and Envar.

=== Asset Services ===
Downer's Asset Services line includes its Oil and Gas, Power Generation and Industrial businesses and it works with customers in the public and private sectors delivering services including design, engineering, construction and maintenance of critical assets. In the oil and gas sector, Downer's capabilities cover the full range of services including maintenance, shutdown, turnaround and outage delivery, sustaining capital program delivery, project and commissioning services.

Downer also has a Defence business which offers professional and managed services, asset sustainment and estate upkeep services to the Australian and New Zealand defence forces.

=== Mining ===
On 1 February 2021, Downer completed the sale of its Open Cut Mining West business to MACA Limited. The remainder of the Downer Mining business was divested in December 2021 upon sale of its Open Cut Mining East division to Buma Australia Pty Ltd.

== Use of pseudoscience ==
In 2019 Downer admitted to using dowsing, in an attempt to find water pipes while contracting to the Wellington City Council. Dowsing is considered a pseudoscience and there is no scientific evidence that it is any more effective than random chance. Downer told New Zealand Skeptic's chair Craig Shearer that Downer has no concern about the public perception that ratepayer money is being spent on a technique considered pseudoscience. Downer's general manager of business excellence and reputation Brooke Dahlberg said "the method is safe, and it has no plan to ban staff from using it – the choice to use it was up to individual employees."

In December 2019, at the New Zealand Skeptics annual conference, the Downer Group was co-awarded the Bent Spoon by NZ Skeptics for "showing the most egregious gullibility in 2019" for the contractor's use of water divining to find underground pipes.

== Sponsorships ==
Downer Group was the naming rights sponsor of the NRL Auckland Nines in 2016 and 2017. It also sponsored the 2016 Anzac Test at the Newcastle International Sports Centre and the 2018 World Club Challenge. Downer will be the major sponsor of the Rugby League World Cup 9s.

In 2017, Downer signed on to be the major sponsor of the Sunshine Coast Lightning netball team.

In 2021, Downer joined mental health organisation Beyond Blue as its Major Partner.
