= Adelaide Metro =

Public transport system around Adelaide, Australia

- Parent: Government of South Australia (Department for Infrastructure and Transport)
- Founded: 23 April 2000
- Headquarters: Adelaide
- Service area: Adelaide
- Service type: Bus (Includes O-Bahn busway), tram and train
- Annual ridership: 69.6 million (2024–25)
- Operator: Torrens Transit; Busways; Keolis Downer (SouthLink)
- Website: adelaidemetro.com.au

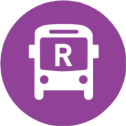
Adelaide Metro's public transport roundels. Left to right: train, bus, tram, regional bus and coach

Adelaide Metro is the brand under which the South Australian Department for Infrastructure and Transport manages the public transport system of Adelaide, the capital city of South Australia. It encompasses an intermodal system offering an integrated network of bus, tram, and train services throughout the metropolitan area.

Adelaide Metro was established in 2000 concurrently with the privatisation of existing government-operated bus routes. Services are now run by two private operators and united with common ticketing systems, marketing, liveries and signage under the supervision of the state government's Department for Infrastructure and Transport. The fleet has been progressively upgraded with electric trains and solar-powered buses–one of which, known as the Tindo electric bus, is 100% solar powered and the first of its kind in the world. Despite this, as of 2016, almost 80 percent of Adelaide's metropolitan buses still run on diesel fuel rather than biodiesel or batteries.

Currently, the Adelaide Metro encompasses seven different train lines, the sole Glenelg tram line, which is the only one of Adelaide's tramways to survive the 1950s and the only one to be integrated into the current system, with extensions added in the 2010s, and over 300 bus routes that extend as far as Strathalbyn.

== History ==
The Adelaide Metro is a brand introduced in April 2000, following the second round of tenders privatisation of formerly government-operated bus services.

The public transport system in Adelaide has previously been known under several names. The State Transport Authority was formed in 1974, combining the metropolitan rail operations of the former South Australian Railways Commission, and the bus and tram operations of the former Municipal Tramways Trust. Adelaide removed almost all tramlines from the 1930s to 1958 leaving only the Glenelg line. This tramline was extended in 2007 by the Department of Transport, Energy & Infrastructure (DTEI), and again to the Adelaide Entertainment Centre in 2010. In July 1994, the STA was abolished and government public transport services were transferred to TransAdelaide, a publicly owned corporation.

In 1995–96, there was a partial tendering of the bus services. TransAdelaide retained three contract regions, Serco won two contract regions, and Hills Transit a joint venture between Australian Transit Enterprises and TransAdelaide, one. Services were run and marketed under each operator's name, presenting a disjointed network to the public.

The 2000 round of tenders ended TransAdelaide's direct operation of bus services, while retaining the train and tram services. Serco won the north–south, Outer North, and Outer North-East contract areas. SouthLink won the Outer South contract area. Torrens Transit won the east–west contract area. City Free services and Transitplus, a joint venture between Australian Transit Enterprises and TransAdelaide, won the Hills contract area. The Adelaide Metro brand was applied across all transport operators, appearing to the public as a unified network, with common livery, timetable designs and a city Information Centre.

=== Environmental incentives ===
The State Government has pledged that the Adelaide Metro would use cleaner fuels like biodiesel and natural gas in an effort to make Adelaide a carbon neutral city. In 2016, nearly 80 percent of the Adelaide Metro buses ran on diesel, which is harmful for the environment due to the presence of sulfur. In 2023, the state government announced that a feasibility study was underway to replace Adelaide Metro's ageing diesel train fleet with zero-emission technology.

== Patronage ==
The network had an annual patronage of 69.6 million as of 30 June 2025, (Note: The Australian financial year is from 1 July to 30 June.) (a 13.5% increase in the decade from financial year 2014–15), of which 45.9 million journeys were by bus (10.9% rise), 14.6 million by train (33.9%), and 9.0 million by tram (1.1%).

2024–25 Adelaide Metro patronage by mode.
Mode	Patronage	% of total
Bus	45,930,664	66.00
Train	14,646,651	21.05
Tram	9,011,665	12.95
Total	69,588,980	100.00

== Services ==
=== Buses ===
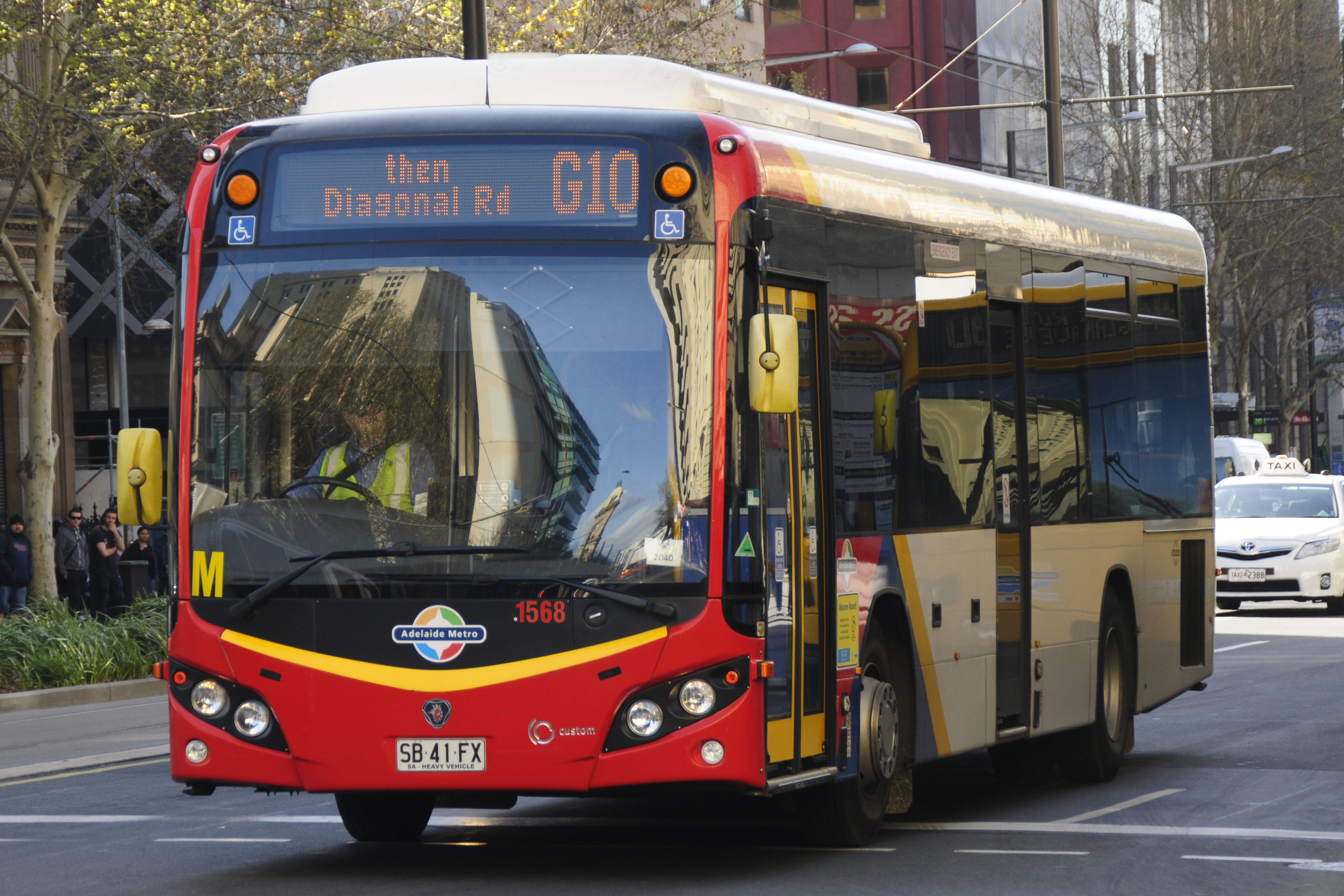
An Adelaide Metro Scania K280UB

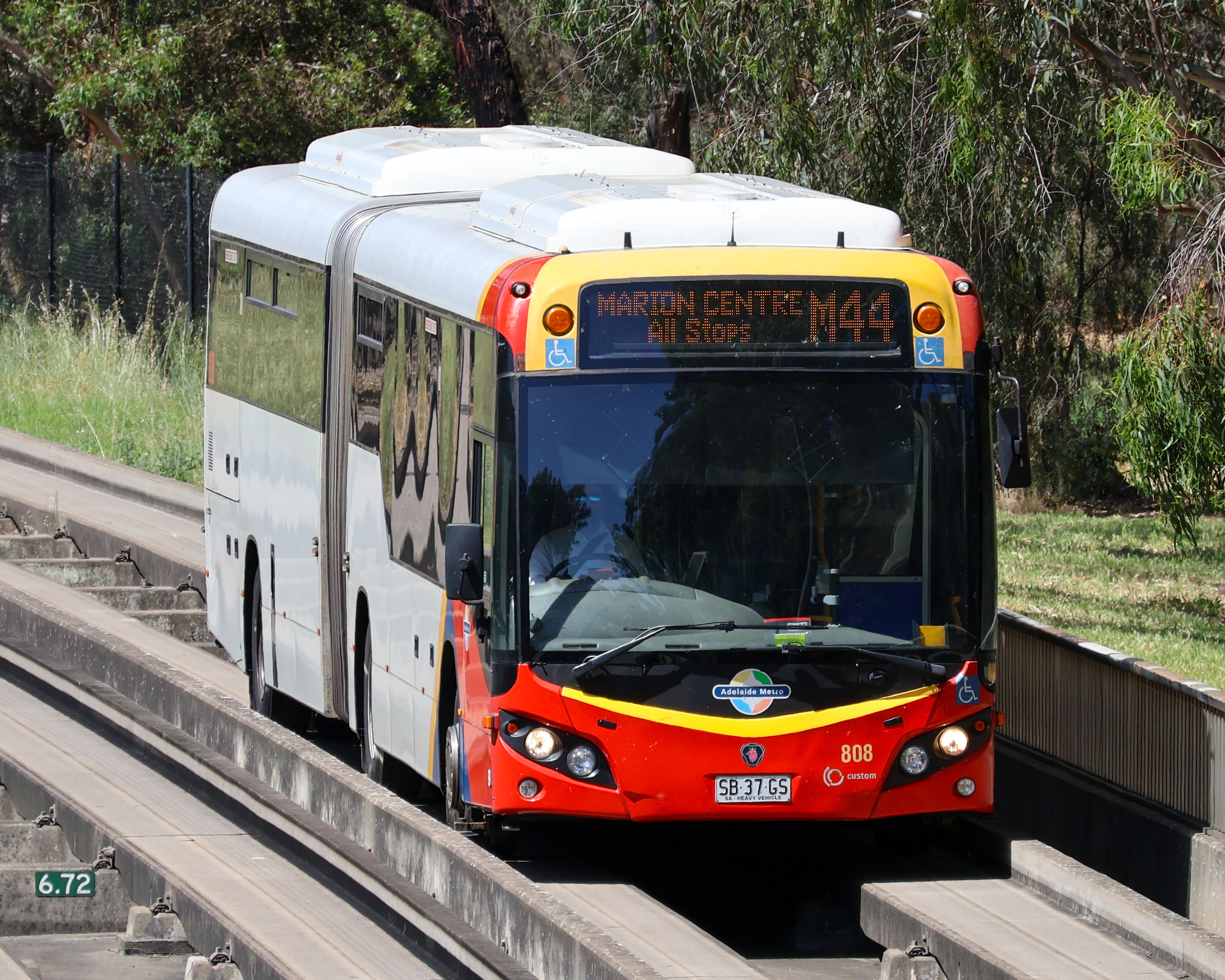
A bus on the O-Bahn Busway

The largest element of Adelaide's public transport system is a fleet of diesel, electric, hybrid and natural gas powered buses. The majority of services terminate in the Adelaide city centre, suburban railway stations or shopping centre interchanges. As contracts are revised for privatised bus operations, more cross suburban routes are added to the network. In the past, bus routes were largely focused on moving passengers from the suburbs to the CBD.

A major component of the Adelaide Metro bus service is the O-Bahn guided busway to Modbury, carrying around 9 million passengers a year. From its opening in 1986 until August 2011 it was the world's longest busway, with a length of 12 kilometres (7.5 mi). It remains the world's fastest busway with a maximum permitted speed of 100 km/h (62 mph). Away from the O-Bahn, whilst there have been dedicated bus lanes and bus-only signal phases at some traffic lights provided for a number of years, a major improvement to bus priority and reliability arrived with the delivery in July 2012 of the CBD Bus Lane project.

The City Connector buses are two circular bus routes which are free of charge. They operate seven days a week and run every 15 minutes. The 98A (anticlockwise) and 98C (clockwise) buses operate inside the city centre and North Adelaide, whereas the 99A and 99C buses operate within only the CBD.

Adelaide Metro buses are split up geographically into six contract regions, with services operated by Torrens Connect, Torrens Transit, SouthLink and Busways. The current contracts began in July 2020 for a period of eight years, with an option to extend for two years.

=== Trains ===
The Adelaide suburban railway network consists of seven lines. On 31 January 2021, operations were contracted to Keolis Downer. In 2023, the newly elected Labor state government announced that rail services would return to government operation in January 2025, fulfilling an election commitment by the party. Keolis Downer would then continue to provide maintenance, customer and security services until 2027. The handover of operations back to state government was completed on 2 February 2025.

Until 2014, the suburban network was the only one in Australia to operate solely with diesel railcars. Between 2013 and 2014, the full lengths of the Seaford and Tonsley lines were electrified, as well as the adjacent segment of the Belair line from Goodwood to its terminus at Adelaide. Electric trains have run on the Seaford and Tonsley lines since 2014. Although the original plans were to electrify the remaining three lines, they were abandoned in 2012. The Gawler line was electrified in 2022.

As at March 2025, the fleet consists of 50 3000/3100 class diesel railcars and 34 three-carriage 4000 class electric multiple units. All the remaining 2000/2100 class train cars were retired from service in August 2015.

Adelaide's rail lines all run into Adelaide railway station in the CBD. They are:

Line	Length	First service	Information	Electrified	Map
Belair	21.5 km (13.36 mi)	1883	Adelaide to Bridgewater opened 1883, Belair to Bridgewater closed 1987. The Adelaide to Melbourne main line via Belair and Bridgewater was converted to standard gauge in 1995, leaving one broad-gauge track from Goodwood to Belair.	Between Adelaide and Goodwood	
Gawler	42.2 km (26.22 mi)	1857	Adelaide to Gawler opened 1857, Gawler to Gawler Central opened 1911.	Yes	
Grange	5.5 km (3.42 mi)	1882	Woodville to Grange opened 1882. Grange to Henley Beach 1894–1957, now demolished. Services share use of the Outer Harbor line until branching at Woodville.	—	
Outer Harbor	10.2 km (6.34 mi)	1856	Adelaide to Port Dock opened 1856, Port Adelaide to Outer Harbor opened 1908.	—	
Port Dock	12.0 kilometres (7.5 miles)	1856	Adelaide to Port Dock opened 1856, Port Dock spur closed 1981, rebuilt 2024. Services share use of the Outer Harbor line until branching north of Alberton.	—	Not Available
Seaford	35.9 km (22.31 mi)	1913	Adelaide to Marino opened 1913, Marino to Hallett Cove opened 1915, Lonsdale to Christie Downs opened 1976, Christie Downs to Noarlunga Centre opened 1978, Noarlunga Centre to Seaford opened 2014.	Yes	
Flinders	4.5 km (2.80 mi)	1966	Woodlands Park to Tonsley opened 1966, Tonsley to Flinders opened 2020. Services share usage of the Seaford line until branching at Woodlands Park.	Yes	

==== Rolling stock ====
Class	Image	Type	Top speed (km/h)	Builders	Built	Number	Lines Served	Notes
3000		DMU	130	Comeng; Clyde Engineering	1988–1996	30	Belair; Grange; Outer Harbor; Port Dock	Interiors refurbished 2011 and 2021–22. Mechanically refurbished 2018–19.
3100	3000-3100 Class Railcars 3124 and 3123 at Midlunga railway station	DMU	130	Comeng; Clyde Engineering	1988–1996	40	Belair; Grange; Outer Harbor; Port Dock	Interiors refurbished 2011 and 2021–22. Mechanically refurbished 2018–19.
4000 (A-City)		EMU	110	Bombardier; Alstom (Note: Bombardier Transportation was acquired by Alstom on 29 January 2021, during construction of the second batch of A-City trains. All of this batch were delivered by Alstom.)	2013–2015, 2019–2023	34 3-car sets	Gawler; Seaford; Flinders	

=== Trams ===
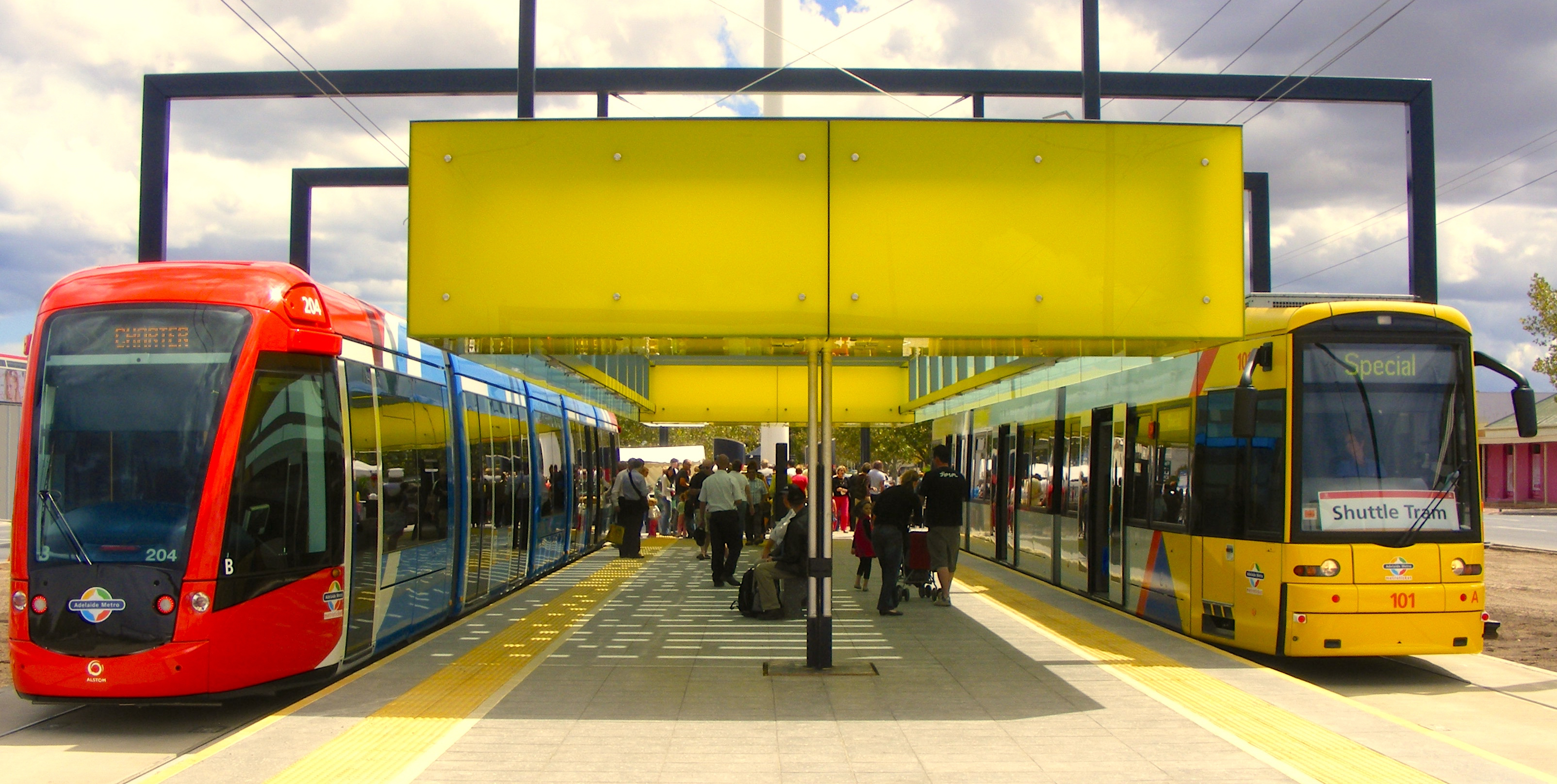
Alstom Citadis and Flexity Classic trams

Adelaide's once extensive tram network was dismantled in the middle of the 20th century, leaving only the Glenelg tram running 12 kilometres (7.5 mi) between Victoria Square in the city-centre and Moseley Square on the beachfront at Glenelg. The majority of the line is on a dedicated corridor though the western suburbs, and travels on roadway in the city from the terminus to South Terrace and along Jetty Road in Glenelg. There is also a free tram zone, covering the entire Entertainment Centre to Botanic Gardens line and the Glenelg line between Brighton Road and Moseley Square.

An extension of the line from Victoria Square down King William Street then along North Terrace opened in October 2007. A further extension along Port Road to the Adelaide Entertainment Centre opened in December 2009. The line has stops adjacent to key city points, including Rundle Mall, the Adelaide Railway Station and the City West campus of the University of South Australia.

A 2018 extension added stops adjacent to more key locations including the Festival Theatre, the Art Gallery, the University of Adelaide and the Adelaide Botanic Garden. Construction this new junction, branch lines along the eastern end of North Terrace and King William Road and four new stops began in July/August 2017 and opened in October 2018. There is no fare charged on certain sections of the line.

The line is operated from Glengowrie depot, with 15 Bombardier Flexity Classic trams built between 2005 and 2010 and nine Alstom Citadis trams that were built for, but were surplus to their needs of Metro Ligero, Madrid in 2009. The latter were modified by Yarra Trams' Preston Workshops before entering service. A further three unused former Madrid Citadis trams entered service in 2018.

In July 2019, the government announced the provision of tram services would be contracted out. Torrens Connect began operating the trams in July 2020. In 2023, the newly elected Labor state government announced that tram services would return to government operation in July 2025, fulfilling an election commitment by the party. The handover of operations back to state government was completed on 31 August 2025.

== Interchanges ==
According to Adelaide Metro, interchanges "provide convenient connections between buses and trains. Many also feature Park 'n' Ride services and bike storage."

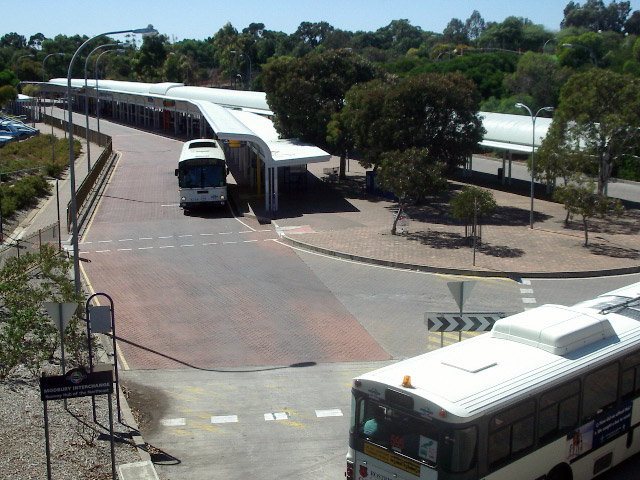
Tea Tree Plaza Interchange (2007)

- Aberfoyle Interchange – Located in the southern suburbs at the Aberfoyle Hub Shopping Centre with connections to Chandlers Hill, the City and Old Reynella
- Arndale Interchange – Located in the north western suburbs at the Armada Arndale Shopping Centre
- Blackwood Interchange – Located in the south eastern suburbs in the Adelaide Hills and provides train transfers from the Belair line with bus connections to Upper Sturt, Stirling, Crafers and Aldgate
- Crafers Park 'n' Ride Interchange – Located in the Adelaide Hills, connections available to Piccadilly, Stirling, Mount Barker and Blackwood
- Elizabeth Interchange – Located in Adelaide's northern suburbs and interconnects train services on the Gawler line with bus services to areas around metropolitan Adelaide including Salisbury North, Salisbury, Munno Para, and Smithfield
- Flinders University and Flinders Medical Centre – Located in the mid-southern suburbs, these two interchanges (located close together) connect to Marion Interchange, City, Glenelg and the Outer-South.
- Glanville Interchange – Located at the bottom of Semaphore Road and provides bus and train transfers from the Outer Harbor line to Port Adelaide, and Osborne
- Golden Grove Village – Located in the Outer North-East, may services from the O-Bahn continue to here and connect to Salisbury, Greenwith and Fairview Park
- Klemzig Interchange – Located in the inner north-eastern suburbs with bus connections to Oakden and the Circle Line. Intermediate station on the O-Bahn Busway
- Marion Interchange – Located in the Mid-South, one of Adelaide's biggest interchanges, connections to City, Glenelg, the Outer-South and Blackwood station
- Mawson Interchange – Located in Adelaide's northern suburbs and interconnects train services on the Gawler line and bus services to areas around metropolitan Adelaide including Adelaide, Mawson Lakes and Salisbury
- Mount Barker Dumas Street Park 'n' Ride – Located in the Adelaide Hills, connections are available to Strathalbyn (operated by non-metroticket service), Nairne, Murray Bridge (via non-metroticket service operated by LinkSA) and Lobethal via Hahndorf
- Noarlunga Centre Interchange
- Old Reynella Bus Interchange and Colonnades Shopping Centre – Located in Adelaide's southern suburbs and interconnects trains services on the Seaford line with bus services to the outer southern suburbs including Aldinga, Seaford and Moana
- Paradise Interchange – Located in the north-eastern suburbs with bus connections to Para Hills, Athelstone, Newton and Campbelltown, intermediate station on the O-Bahn Busway
- Salisbury Interchange – Located in Adelaide's northern suburbs and interconnects train services on the Gawler line with bus services to areas around metropolitan Adelaide including Salisbury North, Paralowie, Burton, Virginia, Greenwith, Elizabeth, Hillbank, Greenfields, Mawson Lakes and Parafield Gardens
- Smithfield Interchange – Located in Adelaide's northern suburbs and interconnects train services on the Gawler line with bus services to areas around metropolitan Adelaide including Munno Para, Craigmore and Andrews Farm
- Tea Tree Plaza Interchange – Located in the north-eastern suburbs at the Westfield Tea Tree Plaza and the Tea Tree Plus Shopping Centres, terminus of the O-Bahn Busway

== Fares and tickets ==
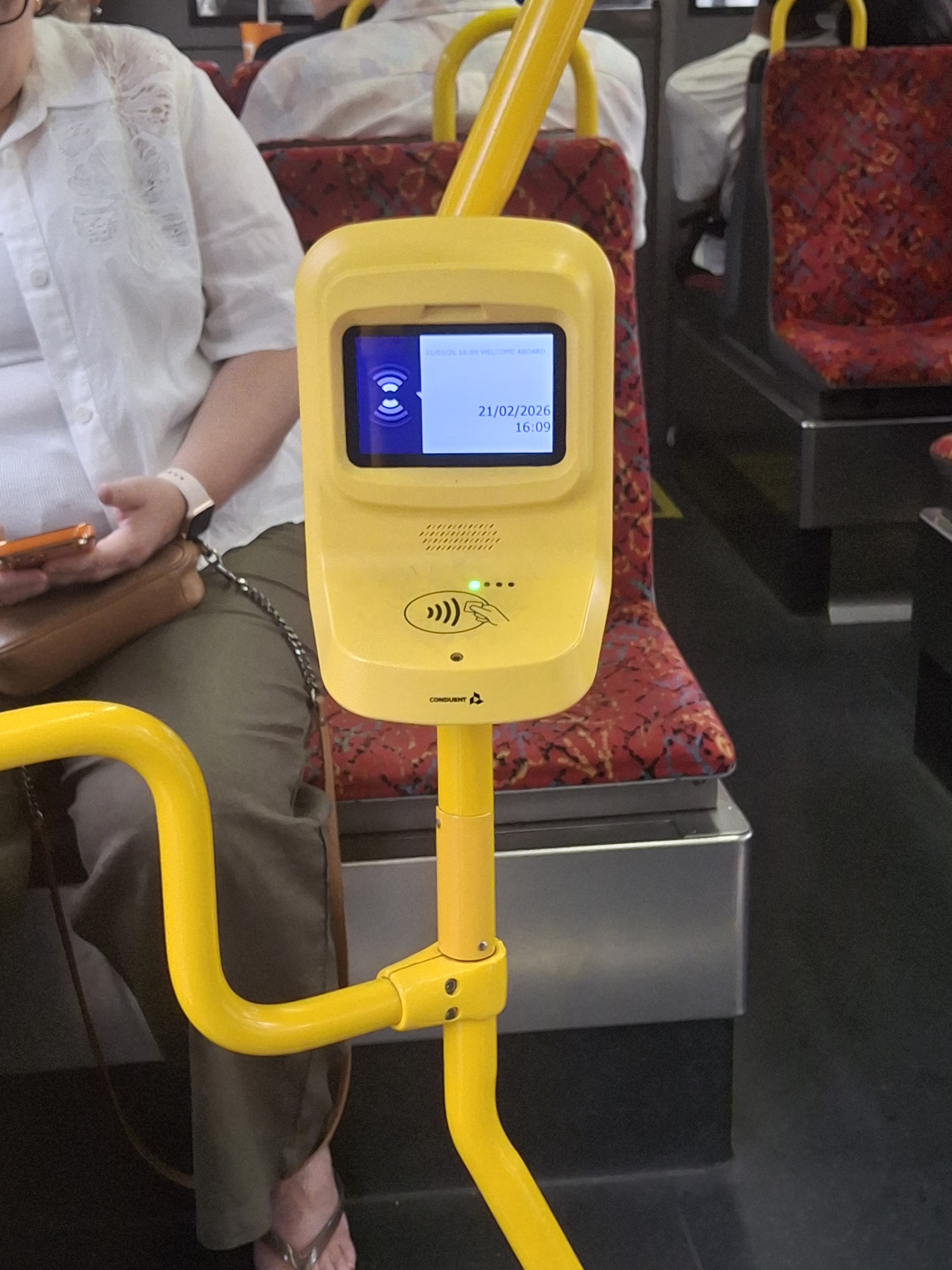
An Adelaide Metro validator that accepts all forms of tickets

The Adelaide Metro ticketing system is multi-modal, meaning that one ticket can be used to transfer between trains, trams and buses, regardless of the service provider.

In September 1987, the Metroticket system was introduced. Developed by Crouzet, the system used magnetic strip technology. In 2015, multiple trip tickets were discontinued. In 2026, single trip tickets were discontinued, along with the rest of the system.

In November 2012, the metroCARD system was introduced. Developed by Affiliated Computer Services, the system uses smart card technology.

In 2021, contactless payments were introduced to all tram services, allowing passengers to use a Mastercard or Visa card to pay for fares. In 2022, the roll-out continued to all O-Bahn bus services. In 2023, the roll-out continued to all remaining bus services and train services departing Adelaide railway station. In 2026, the roll-out was completed for all remaining train services.

In 2024, the Buy & Go App was introduced, allowing passengers to pay for fares on their smartphones and use a QR code to validate their tickets.

== See also ==
- Buses in Adelaide
- Commuter rail in Australia
- metroCARD
- O-Bahn Busway
- Railways in Adelaide
- Rail transport in South Australia
- State Transport Authority, South Australia
- Trams in Adelaide
- Transport in Adelaide
- Transport in South Australia
- TransAdelaide
- List of public transport routes in Adelaide
