= Keolis Australia =

Australian transportation company

- Type: Subsidiary
- Industry: Public transport
- Founded: 30 November 2009
- Headquarters: Sydney
- Area served: Australia
- Key people: David Franks (CEO)
- Products: Bus, Train, Tram and Ferry operations
- Owner: Keolis
- Subsidiaries: G:link; Hornibrook Bus Lines; Keolis Downer Northern Beaches; LinkSA; Newcastle Transport; Path Transit; SouthLink
- Website: www.keolis.au

Keolis Australia is the subsidiary of public transport operator Keolis which operates bus, train, tram and ferry services in Australia. Previously a joint venture between Keolis and Downer Group known as Keolis Downer, it was rebranded in March 2026 after Keolis bought out Downer Group's shareholding in December 2025.

== History ==
Keolis Downer Rail's logo between 2009 and 2015

Keolis Downer's logo between 2015 and 2026

In June 2009, the Victorian government awarded to Keolis Downer the franchise to operate the Melbourne tram network in Melbourne, Australia for eight years, starting in November 2009. Keolis Downer continued to use the Yarra Trams name, which had been used by the previous operator TransdevTSL. In September 2017, having substantially met performance criteria, the franchise was extended until 30 November 2024. Keolis Downer was not awarded a new tram franchise, and on 1 December 2024, the Yarra Trams operation was handed over to Yarra Journey Makers, a joint venture of John Holland and Transdev.

In July 2014, Keolis Downer began operating the G:link tram operation on the Gold Coast. In March 2015, Keolis Downer purchased bus operator Australian Transit Enterprises, which operated the Hornibrook Bus Lines, LinkSA, Path Transit and SouthLink operations with 930 buses.

Keolis Downer, trading as Newcastle Transport took over the Newcastle Buses & Ferries operation in July 2017. It began operating the Newcastle Light Rail in February 2019.

In January 2021, Keolis Downer began an eight-year contract to operate the Adelaide Metro rail network. In April 2023, it was announced by the Labor state government that an agreement with Keolis Downer had been reached to terminate the contract early, with operations handed back to state government on 2 February 2025. However, Keolis Downer would continue to provide maintenance, customer and security services until 2027.

In October 2021, Keolis Downer Northern Beaches began an eight-year contract to operate Region 8, the Northern Beaches and Lower North Shore, of the Sydney Metropolitan Bus Service Contracts. Keolis Downer has operated on-demand services in the area since November 2017.

In July 2025, it was announced that Keolis had agreed terms to purchase Downer's 49% stake in the joint venture. It was completed in December 2025 with the joint venture rebranded as Keolis Australia in March 2026.

== Operations ==
=== New South Wales ===
- Newcastle Transport – Bus services in Newcastle, Stockton ferry service and Newcastle Light Rail services
- Keolis Northern Beaches – bus services in Sydney's Northern Beaches, as part of the Sydney Bus Region 8 contract
- Keoride – Northern Beaches on-demand bus service

=== Queensland ===
- G:link – light rail in Gold Coast
- Hornibrook Bus Lines – bus services in the Redcliffe Peninsula

=== South Australia ===
- LinkSA – in the Adelaide Hills, Barossa Valley, Mid-Murray, Murraylands and Victor Harbor regions
- SouthLink – Bus services in Adelaide under contract to Adelaide Metro

=== Western Australia ===
- Path Transit – bus services in Perth and Geraldton

=== Former operations ===
==== Victoria ====
- Yarra Trams – trams in Melbourne, operated by Keolis Downer between 2009 and 2024

==== Adelaide ====
- Adelaide Metro rail services, operated by Keolis Downer between 2021 and 2025
