= Keolis =

French multinational transport company

Coordinates: 48°52′15″N 2°19′41″E

- Type: Private
- ISIN: FR0000036196
- Industry: Public transport
- Founded: 2001; 25 years ago
- Headquarters: Paris, France
- Area served: Worldwide
- Key people: Christelle Villadary (Interim Executive Board Chairwoman)
- Revenue: €7.7 billion (2025)
- Number of employees: 70,000 (2025)
- Parent: SNCF (70%); La Caisse (30%)
- Website: www.keolis.com/en

Keolis is a French transportation company that operates public transport systems all over the world. It manages bus, rapid transit, tram, coach networks, rental bikes, car parks, water taxi, cable car, trolleybus, and funicular services. Based in Paris, France, the company is 70% owned by SNCF and 30% owned by the Caisse de dépôt et placement du Québec.

Keolis operates a number of networks in France (Transports Bordeaux Métropole in Bordeaux, the Lyon public transport on behalf of SYTRAL, the public transport service for the Greater Rennes area since 1998, Ilévia in Lille, and the entire mobility chain in Dijon). Internationally, it manages buses in several cities in Sweden, central and eastern regions of the Netherlands, and in the United States. It also manages various rail networks internationally, such as the commuter rail in Boston, the Hyderabad Metro, the Docklands Light Railway in London, the Pujiang line of the Shanghai Metro, the Nottingham Express Transit, and the Manchester Metrolink.

== History ==
=== Origins ===
Keolis was formed from several former companies:

- Société des transports automobiles, which was created in 1908, and its subsidiary Société générale des transports départementaux
- Lesexel, an electricity company created in 1911 to support the development of tramways
- Société de transports routiers de voyageurs (STRV), a subsidiary of SCETE and later SNCF, which was renamed Cariane in 1988 during its merger with STV

These companies underwent a series of reorganizations, mergers and acquisitions, which resulted in two companies: VIA-GTI, focused primarily on urban transport, and Cariane, specialized in interurban public transport.

=== Creation and development in the 2000s ===
In 1999, SNCF became the leading shareholder in VIA-GTI, which merged with Cariane in 2001 to become Keolis. In 2005, through its stake in GoVia, Keolis became co-owner of the South Eastern rail franchise in the United Kingdom. In 2006, Keolis won the franchise for Hellweg Net in Germany and later on for Maas-Rhein-Lippe Net and Teutoburger-Wald Net in Deutschland and Nederland. In 2007, Keolis acquired City-Trafic in Denmark. In 2008, Keolis took control of Eurobus Holding in Belgium. In 2009, Keolis set up operations in Melbourne, Washington, D.C., Bergen and Bordeaux. In 2010, EFFIA (car parks company) became a Keolis subsidiary.

=== Since 2010 ===
In 2012, Keolis acquired 100% of Syntus in the Netherlands and Orléans Express in Canada. The company also set up operations in Hyderabad, India. In 2013, Keolis won part of the Las Vegas urban network. In 2014, Keolis won a 30-year public-private partnership contract to maintain and operate the Ion rapid transit in Waterloo, Ontario, Canada.

In the same year, Keolis won the operations and maintenance contract for Metrolink, the United Kingdom's largest tramway network, in Manchester, and was also selected by Foothill Transit to operate and maintain the Municipal Transit Network for the Eastern San Gabriel Valley of Los Angeles County.

The company also expanded in the Asian market, starting operation of Hyderabad's automatic air metro network, and winning, as part of a joint venture with RATP Dev and the Qatar Hamad Group, the contract to operate and maintain Qatar's first public transport network, including the operation of the future automatic metro in Doha and the tramway network in the new city of Lusail.

In 2018, the company generated revenues of €5.9 billion and had 63,000 employees. Keolis has been led by Marie-Ange Debon since September 2020.

In 2018, Keolis started operating the Pujiang metro line (formerly known as 8.3), the first automatic metro line in the Shanghai network, and started a contract to operate the Wales & Borders rail network in Wales until the nationalisation of day to day services in February 2021, with Keolis retaining a partnership with the new national operator until the original contract expires.

== Operations ==
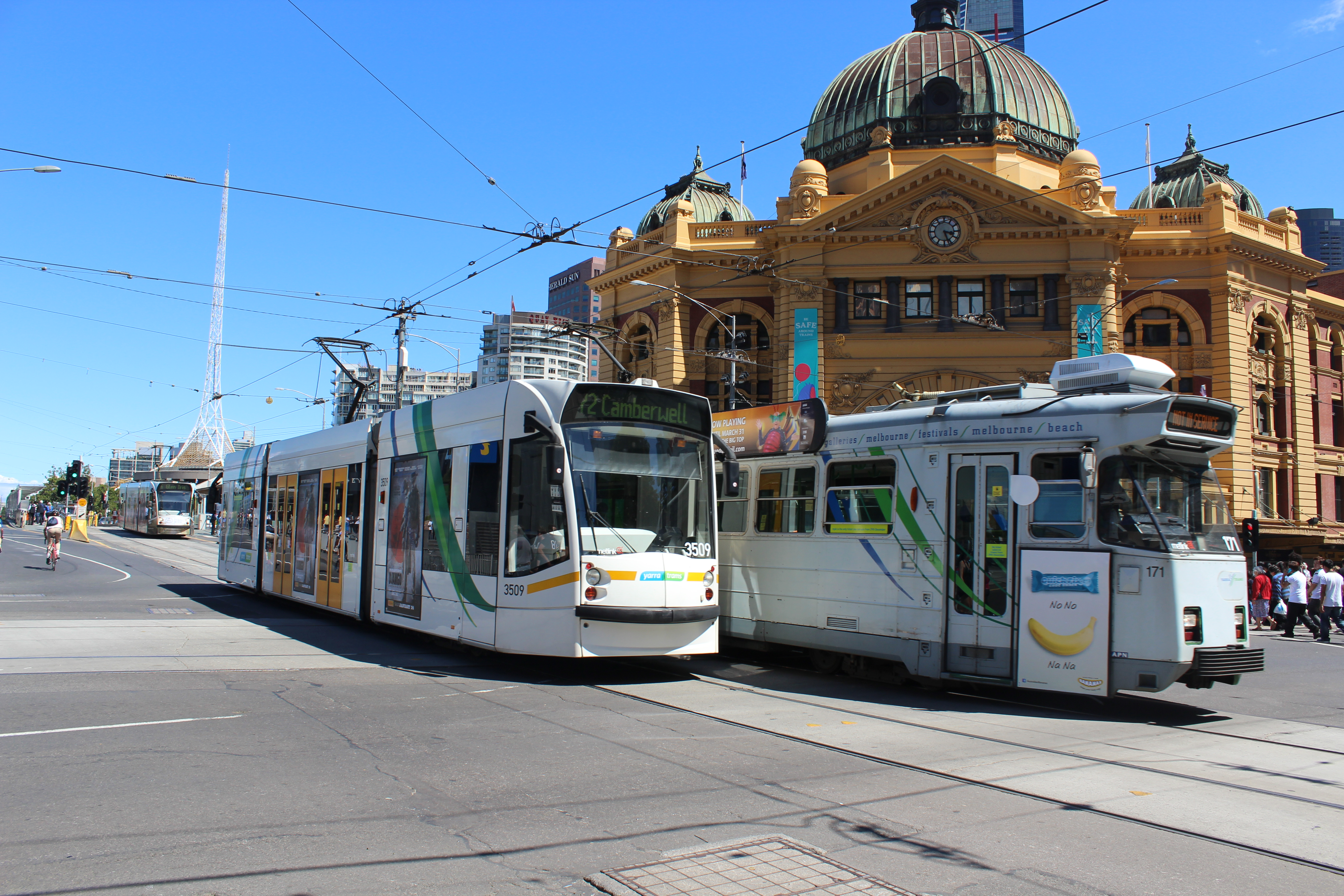
Keolis Downer trams at Flinders Street station in February 2013

=== Australia ===
Keolis held 51% shareholding in Keolis Downer, which has operated the Melbourne tram network since November 2009. Keolis Downer has operated the G:link light rail line on the Gold Coast since July 2014.

In March 2015, Keolis Downer purchased bus operator Australian Transit Enterprises, which operates the Hornibrook Bus Lines, LinkSA, Path Transit and SouthLink operations with 930 buses. During July 2017, Keolis Downer trading as Newcastle Transport took over the Newcastle Buses & Ferries business under a 10-year contract. Newcastle Transport also operates the Newcastle Light Rail since February 2019. In October 2019, the Government of New South Wales announced that the bus operations of State Transit were to be contracted out to the private sector. During May 2021, Keolis Downer was awarded the contract to operate Sydney Bus Region 8. Keolis Downer Northern Beaches (KDNB) commenced operating on 31 October 2021 with its contract to run for eight years.

In July 2025, Keolis agreed terms to purchase Downer Group's 49% stake in Keolis Downer. It was completed in December 2025 with the joint venture rebranded to Keolis Australia.

=== Canada ===
Keolis Canada operates as a subsidiary of Keolis America. The majority of its Canadian operations are located in Montreal, where it operates the Quebec intercity bus company Orléans Express and part of the Exo Mascouche sector. In addition, under its own brand, Keolis provides shuttle bus services between Ottawa Train Station and Montreal Airport for Air France and KLM passengers.

From 2004 to 2012, the company also operated Acadian Lines intercity buses in The Maritimes. The latter services have since been taken over by independent operator Maritime Bus.

Keolis is a partner in the GrandLinq consortium and operator of the Ion rapid transit system in Waterloo Region, Ontario.

In July 2024, Keolis announced that it is acquiring Pacific Western Transportation's Transit and Motorcoach operations.

Keolis is a partner in the Cadence consortium. In February 2025, it was announced they would be developing Alto (high-speed rail), a high-speed rail line between Toronto and Quebec City.

=== China ===
In China, Keolis and Shanghai Shentong Metro Group, the owner of Shanghai Metro, created a joint venture called Shanghai Keolis in March 2014. Shanghai Keolis started operating the Pujiang line (formerly Phase 3 of Shanghai Metro Line 8) in March 2018. It would also be operating Shanghai Pudong International Airport's people mover system in 2019, which will link the proposed satellite concourse building with the existing Terminal 1 and Terminal 2, as well as the Songjiang Tram within the Songjiang Region, a suburb west of Shanghai downtown, in 2020.

An agreement had been signed between Keolis and Hubei Government, and Keolis will be responsible for Greater Wuhan area's suburban railway operation.

=== Denmark ===
Keolis Danmark is the second biggest bus operator in Denmark with 500 buses and 1,500 employees. Keolis entered the Danish market in 1999 when they bought 49% of the Danish bus operator City-Trafik. During 2007, City-Trafik became a wholly owned subsidiary of Keolis. In 2014, City-Trafik surprised the Danish bus industry when they announced their plans to merger with Nettbuss Danish subsidiary in a joint venture, Keolis owning 75% while Nettbuss held a 25% stake, until the merger was accepted by the Danish authorities. The former City-Trafik was named Keolis Bus Danmark and the former Nettbuss Danmark was named Keolis Danmark. During late 2014, the Danish authorities accepted the merger, permitting the two companies to merge as Keolis Danmark in the following year. During 2015, Keolis was also awarded a contract to operate the first tram in Denmark in Aarhus, which was set to open two years later. In 2016, Keolis SA bought the last 25% of the shares from Nettbuss AS, making Keolis Danmark a wholly owned subsidiary of Keolis.

=== France ===
Keolis has extensive operations in France. It provides transit services in many cities including Bordeaux, Dijon, Lille, Lyon, Orléans, and Rennes. In January 2016, the 260 vehicle Transports Daniel Myers business was purchased. Based in the Essonne/Val-de-Marne basin, its main operations are in Montlhéry, Etampes and Avrainville.

=== Germany ===
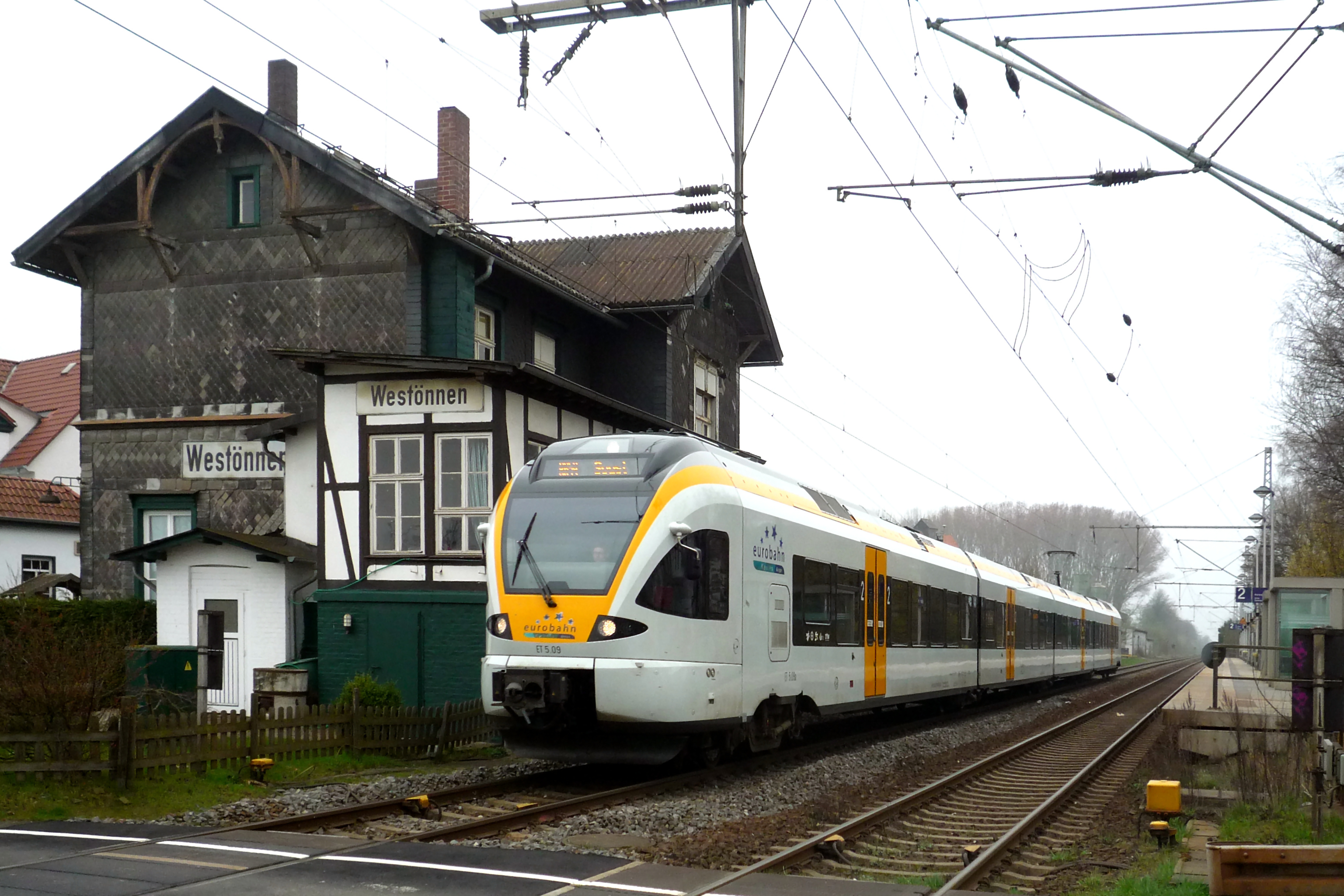
Eurobahn Stadler Flirt Class 428 in Westönnen, 2009

Keolis held a majority (60/40) stake with Rhenus in the Eurobahn joint venture at its founding in 1998. Under the Eurobahn brand, Keolis operated multiple regional train services in the German state of North Rhine-Westphalia, Lower Saxony and in the Netherlands. Eurobahn used Stadler Flirt electric multiple units and Bombardier Talent diesel cars to serve these lines. During December 2007, the joint venture was dissolved; at this point, Rhenus took ownership of the bus operations and two railway contracts while Keolis gained full ownership of Eurobahn and the remaining contracts.

In October 2021, Keolis announced its intention to divest Eurobahn and withdraw from the German market. It was sold to a subsidiary of the law firm Noerr during December 2021.

=== India ===
In 2012, Keolis was awarded the Operation and Maintenance contract of the Hyderabad Metro Rail project. This contract marked Keolis's foray into the Indian market. The Hyderabad Metro Rail Project is valued at 220 billion. Keolis Hyderabad, along with L&T, commenced metro rail operations from 27 November 2017.

=== Ireland ===
In March 2026, Transport Infrastructure Ireland and the National Transport Authority announced through joint venture company KeolisAmey, Keolis emerged as the preferred bidder for the contract to operate the Luas light rail system in Dublin. Keolis commenced operations starting 1 September 2026.

=== Netherlands ===
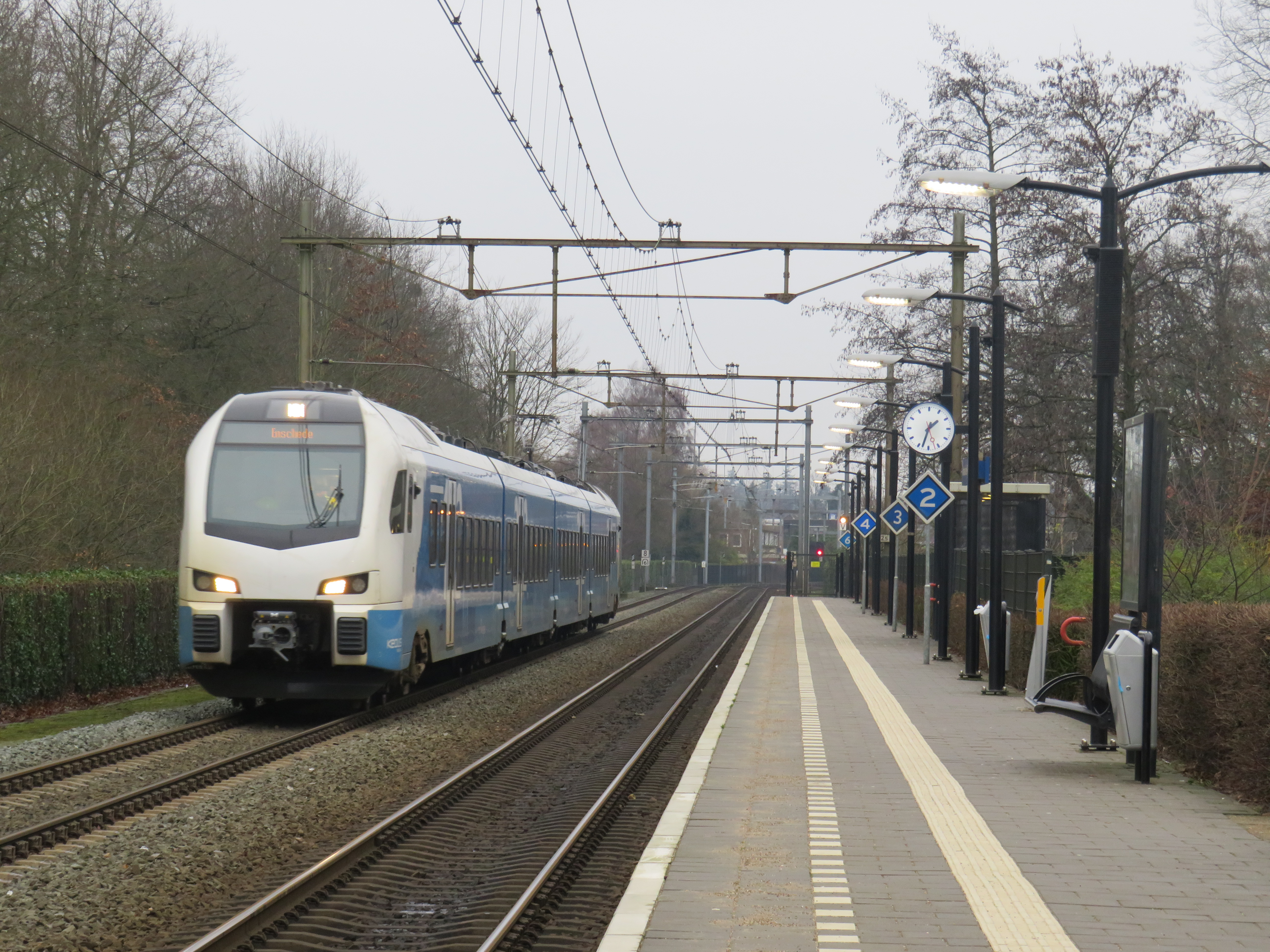
Stadler Flirt EMU at Almelo de Riet station

Keolis's subsidiary in Netherlands is Keolis Nederland, originally named Syntus.

In 1999, Keolis commenced operations in the Netherlands through a 33% shareholding in Syntus. During 2007, this stake was increased to 50%. In 2012, Keolis purchased Nederlandse Spoorwegen's 50% share in the venture, thus acquiring full control of Syntus. The Syntus brand was retired in October 2017 and replaced by the Keolis Nederland brand.

=== Norway ===
Keolis's subsidiary in Norway was Keolis Norge. It was first formed in 2008 as Fjord1 Partner, a joint venture between Fjord1 Nordvestlandske (49%) and Keolis Nordic (51%).

In April 2014, Fjord1 sold their shares to Keolis; to mark this change, the company was rebranded as Keolis Norge AS. On 6 September 2022, DSD AS, the owner of Tide Buss announced they would buy out all shares in Keolis Norge and take over the running of all their contracts, leaving the company defunct.

=== Qatar ===
On 7 December 2017, Qatar Rail, the Qatari national public transport operator, awarded RKH Qitarat — the joint venture based on a consortium between RATP Dev and Keolis (49%) and the Qatari company Hamad Group (51%) — the operations and maintenance contract for the new automated metro of Doha, the capital of Qatar, and a light rail network in Lusail, the second largest city in Qatar, located 15 km from Doha's city center.

=== Sweden ===
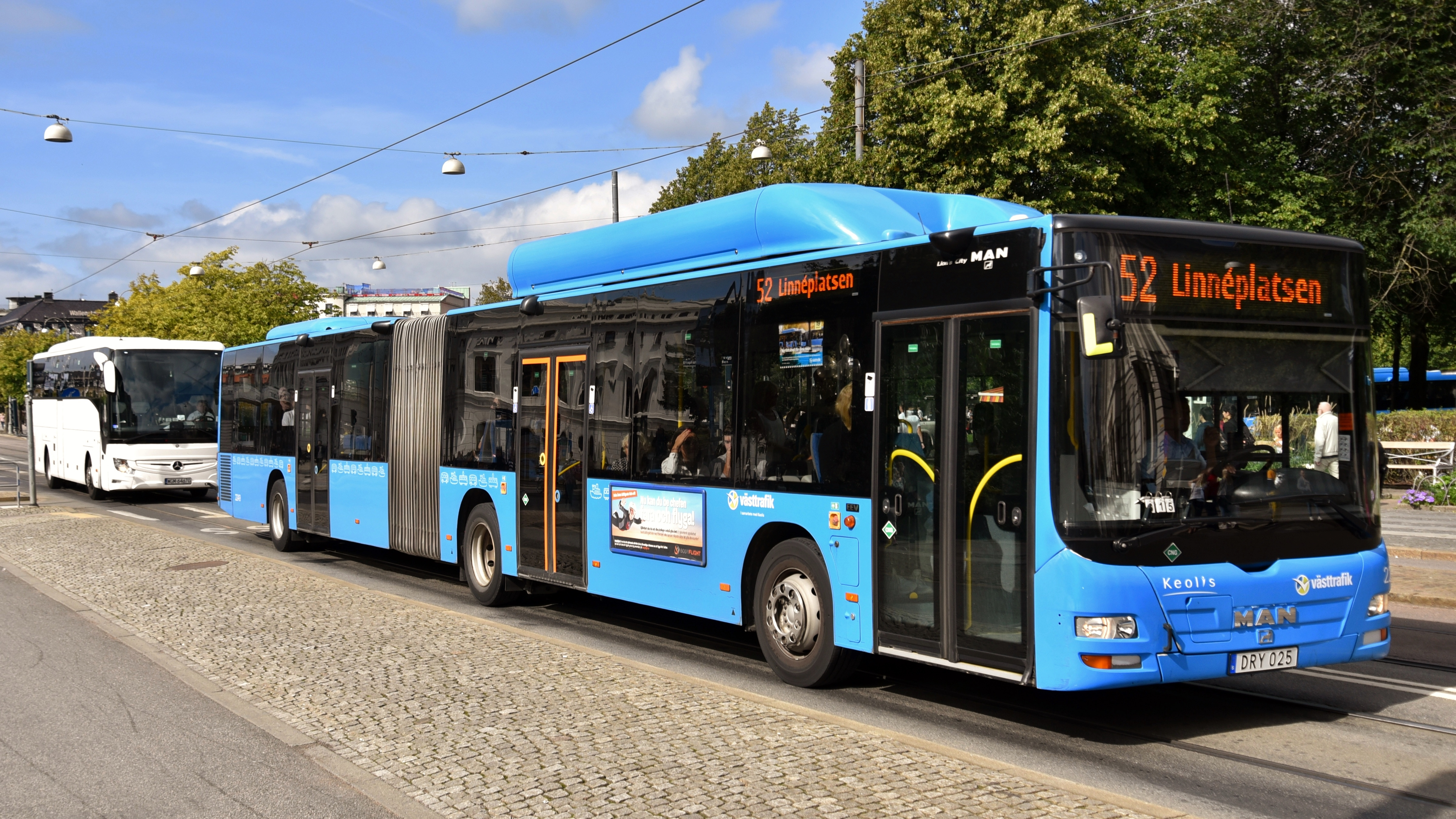
Västtrafik Keolis MAN Lion's City G NG313 CNG operating a line 52 service in Kungsportsavenyn, Gothenburg, Sweden.

Keolis Sverige was founded in 2003 when Keolis bought 70% of Busslink. The remainder was acquired in 2010. Keolis Sverige is the second-largest operator in Swedish bus market.

=== United Kingdom ===
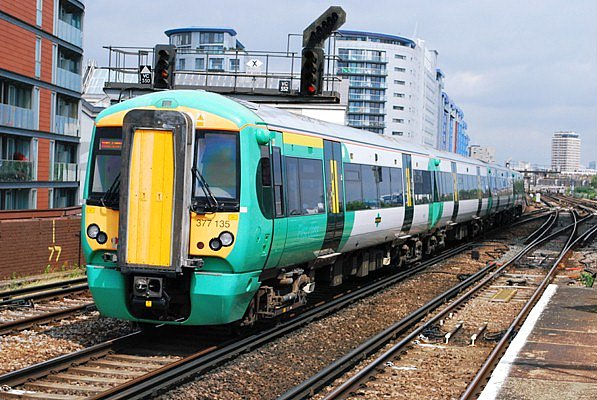
Southern Class 377 at Battersea Park in June 2010

In the United Kingdom, Keolis owns 35% of Govia that previously operated Thameslink, Southeastern, London Midland and Govia Thameslink Railway. Keolis also had a 45% shareholding in First TransPennine Express from February 2004 until March 2016. Upon being re-tendered, FirstGroup took full control.

Sir Michael Hodgkinson was appointed as Chairman of Keolis UK Ltd in December 2011 and remained in post until 2019. During 2012, Keolis lodged a joint bid with SNCF for the aborted InterCity West Coast franchise. In 2014, in partnership with Eurostar, the company submitted a bid for the InterCity East Coast franchise; however, the franchise was awarded to Stagecoach Group/Virgin Group, who traded as Virgin Trains East Coast (VTEC).

Through joint venture company KeolisAmey, Keolis operates both the Docklands Light Railway and Manchester Metrolink concessions. Furthermore, Keolis is part of the Tramlink Nottingham consortium that commenced operating the Nottingham Express Transit tram operation in December 2011. Specifically, operations have been subcontracted to Nottingham Trams Limited, a consortium of Keolis (80%) and Wellglade (20%).

In May 2018, the Wales & Borders franchise was awarded to KeolisAmey Wales, who received a contract valued at £5 billion covering a 15-year period starting on 14 October 2018. This contract included the provision of investment in the Welsh network, including £800M into new rolling stock, £194M to modernise 247 stations and build five new Metro stations, the running of 285 extra services between Monday and Friday along with 294 extra Sunday services.

On 14 October 2018, KeolisAmey Wales commenced operations under the Welsh Government-owned Transport for Wales brand. On 31 May 2020, an Emergency Measures Agreement was approved to assist KeolisAmey Wales; it detailed that the Welsh Government will spend up to £65 million over the next six months to ensure trains continue to operate on the franchise. On 7 February 2021, the franchise was nationalised by the Welsh Government and transferred to a publicly owned operator of last resort, Transport for Wales Rail, with Amey retaining an involvement in delivering key infrastructure projects related to the Core Valley Lines.

=== United States ===
Keolis America is based in Boston, Massachusetts. It does business as Keolis North America, operating public transportation contracts in both the U.S. and Canada. In the U.S., its subsidiaries operate commuter rail systems in Virginia and Massachusetts, as well as fixed-route and shuttle bus systems in several states. In Nevada, Keolis operates bus services along the Las Vegas strip through a contract with the Regional Transportation Commission.

On 16 October 2009, the Virginia Railway Express (VRE) Operations Board approved an $85 million contract with Keolis Rail Services America to operate and maintain VRE trains for five years. Keolis began operating VRE on 12 July 2010 after a two-week delay, ending Amtrak's 18-year tenure as operator. Both Amtrak and Keolis had staffed the VRE lines with about 80 employees. However, during the bidding, a group of Holocaust survivors and Maryland politician Heather Mizeur called for investigations into SNCF's role in transportation of Nazi prisoners to concentration camps during the Second World War before the Keolis contracts could move forward. The operator of the train line, Amtrak, also challenged the propriety of hiring a foreign company.

It has also bid to run some California commuter rail segments and two MARC lines in Maryland, even though with the latter, the company is running into similar issues with the VRE bidding. Another group of Holocaust survivors, led by now-deceased Leo Bretholz also requested investigations of SNCF's involvement in the conflict. As a result, a law was passed to enforce this, leading to major criticism because SNCF had already documented their role in the deportation and had in fact released their archives for research and educational purposes in 1996. Eventually however, Keolis would lose to Canadian company Bombardier Transportation.

On 29 November 2011, Keolis Transit America, Keolis' US subsidiary, announced acquisition of Tectrans Inc., a California-based privately held provider of contract transportation services. Tectrans holdings included in the acquisition included Mobility Plus Transportation, Western Transit Systems, and Diversified Transportation.

On 8 January 2014, the Massachusetts Bay Transportation Authority awarded Keolis Commuter Services a contract to operate 664 miles of passenger service for $2.68 billion over eight years, with the possibility for two two-year extensions that could bring the total price to $4.3 billion. It began operating the MBTA Commuter Rail on 1 July 2014.

Keolis bus operations in the United States include Foothill Transit, OC Bus, and CapMetro Bus.

== Corporate responsibility and strategy ==
The firm is expanding into new markets (through public calls for tenders in France and worldwide) and launching innovative initiatives in mobility.

=== Autonomous shuttles and automated metro systems ===
The company's main innovations in public transport operations are driverless shuttles and automated metro systems:

- Public transport services by self-driving shuttle (through a partnership with Navya, a French manufacturer of self-driving shuttles), which started in September 2016 in Lyon. Keolis currently runs self-driving shuttle services in France and worldwide, particularly in La Défense and Las Vegas.
- Automated metro systems in Shanghai and Hyderabad.

=== Digital services ===
Keolis offers trip planning, booking and payment services:

- The launch in 2015 of the Plan Book Ticket digital app, which combines “plan” features to organize trips, “book” features to reserve them and “ticket” features to obtain and validate a ticket directly using a smartphone
- The Launch in 2018 of an open payment solution on the Dijon transport network (bank cards can now be used as tickets)
- The introduction of the HelloGo app, which enables passengers to plan, reserve and purchase their tickets for all modes of transport in Utrecht

=== Corporate responsibility ===
==== Electromobility and alternative energies ====
Keolis uses electromobility and alternative energies on several of its networks:

- Launch of a biomethane bus service in Sweden in 2015
- Launch of electric bus service in Rennes, Orléans and Los Angeles
- Launch of a natural gas bus service in Montargis in 2018

==== Transport for passengers with reduced mobility ====
Keolis operates transport services for passengers with reduced mobility, such as PAM75 in Paris and PAM94 in the Val-de-Marne department of France.

== Key data ==
Keolis generated revenues of €5.4 billion in 2017. Net profits (group share) amounted to €51 million.

Keolis transports 3 billion passengers annually. International business represents 45% of the company's revenues.

In 2017, the company had 63,000 employees in France and worldwide.
