= 3000 class railcar =

Diesel railcar used in Adelaide, South Australia

3000 and 3100 class railcars
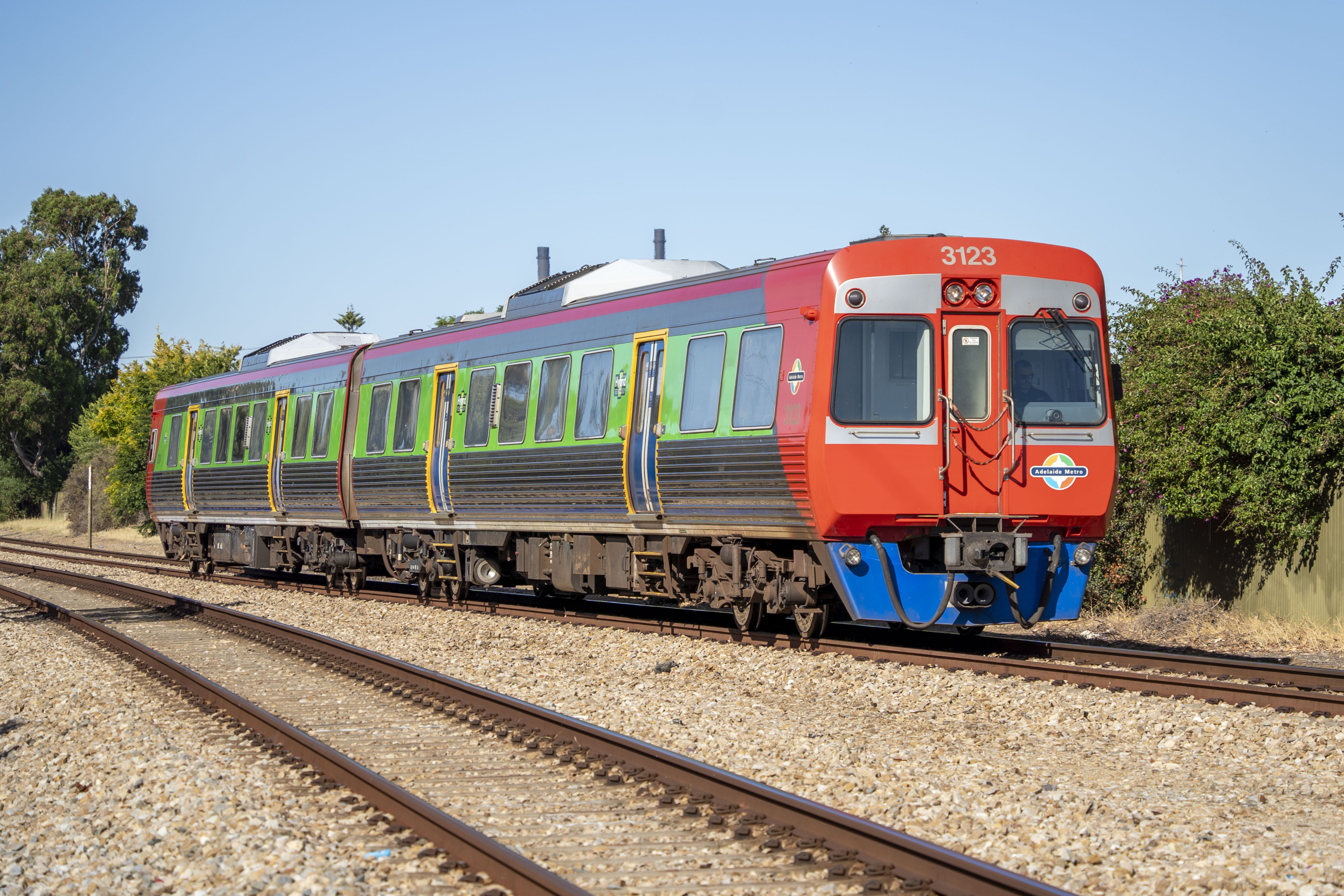
- Adelaide Metro 3100 class railcars approaching Largs North, December 2024

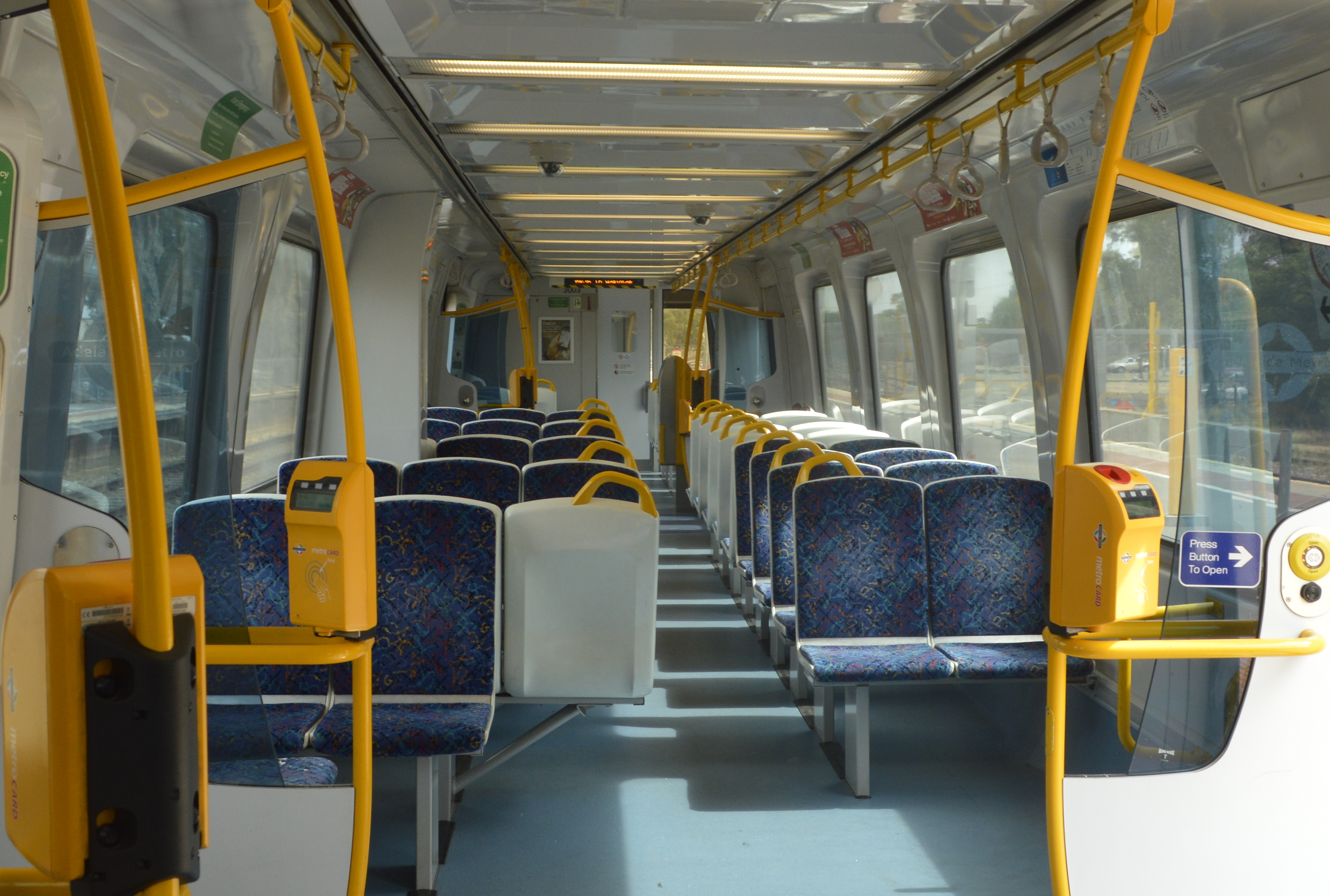
- Interior of a refurbished unit
- Stock type: Diesel Multiple Unit
- In service: 1987–present
- Manufacturers: Comeng, Clyde Engineering
- Built at: Dandenong and Somerton, Victoria
- Replaced: Redhen railcars
- Entered service: 1987–1996
- Refurbished: 2018–2019, 2021–2022, 2023–2025
- Number built: 70
- Number in service: 3009–3030, 3113–3140
- Number retired: 20
- Number preserved: 0
- Formation: Single unit (3000); Married pair (3100)
- Fleet numbers: 3001–3030; 3101–3140
- Capacity: 100 (3000); 110 (3100)
- Operators: State Transport Authority 1987–1994; TransAdelaide 1994–2010; Adelaide Metro 2010–present
- Depots: Dry Creek; Belair
- Lines served: Outer Harbor Grange; Belair; Port Dock

Specifications
- Car length: 25.77 m (84 ft 7 in)
- Width: 3.05 m (10 ft 0 in)
- Height: 4.27 m (14 ft 0 in)
- Maximum speed: 130 km/h (81 mph) (design); 90 km/h (56 mph) (service)
- Weight: 48 t (47 long tons; 53 short tons) (3000); 46 t (45 long tons; 51 short tons) (3100)
- Traction system: After repowering: ABB BORDLINE CC400 DE IGBT power converter
- Prime movers: As built: Strömberg; After repowering: Mercedes-Benz OM502LA v8
- Traction motors: 2 × 130 kW (170 hp) ABB/Stromberg HXR315SC4B7E / HXUR/E632G2B7
- Power output: 780 kW (1,050 hp) (3000); 1,560 kW (2,092 hp) (3100)
- Transmission: Diesel-electric
- UIC classification: (1A)2′ (3000); (1A)2′+2′(A1) (3100)
- Braking system: Knorr-Bremse
- Coupling system: Scharfenberg
- Track gauge: 1,600 mm (5 ft 3 in)

The 3000 class and 3100 class are a class of diesel railcars that operate on the Adelaide rail network. Built by Comeng and Clyde Engineering between 1987 and 1996, they entered service under the State Transport Authority as a replacement for the Redhen railcars, before later being operated by TransAdelaide and Adelaide Metro. Trains are typically coupled as multiple units, though the 3000 class are also able to run as single units when needed. In total, 70 railcars were built and are expected to be retired between 2030 and 2032.

The fleet underwent 3 major refurbishments. The first, an exterior refurbishment, was carried out between 2000 and 2010. The second, a life extension project was completed between 2018 and 2020, aimed to extend the trains' lifespan. The third and most recent refurbishment, a hybrid conversion was carried out on 50 of the 70 railcars to reduce fuel consumption on the fleet. The program was completed in January 2025.

== History ==
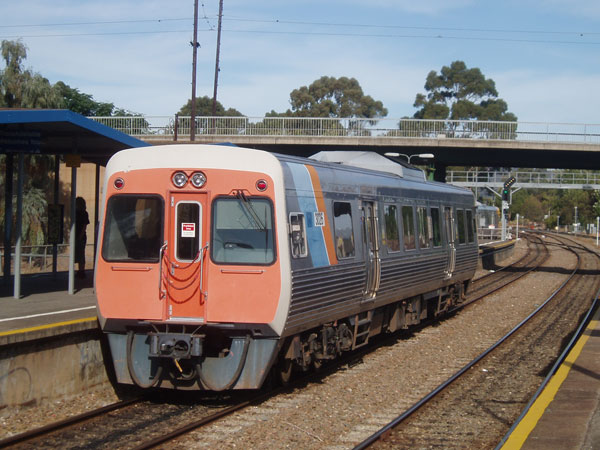
3025 in its original State Transport Authority livery at Goodwood station in May 2005

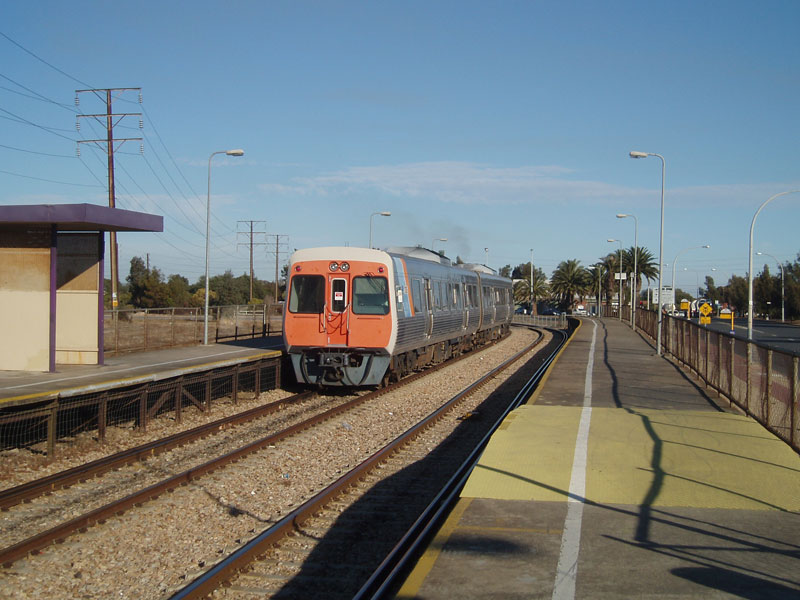
State Transport Authority railcars 3135 & 3136 departing Ethleton station in June 2005

In March 1985, the State Transport Authority (STA) awarded a tender for 20 diesel railcars (eight 3000 class units with a cab at each end and twelve 3100 class with a cab at one end only) to Comeng's Dandenong rolling stock factory. The design was based on the stainless steel shell of the Comeng electric train then in production for Melbourne's Public Transport Corporation, but 2.3 metres (7 ft 7 in) longer and with only two doors per side. Because of a contractual requirement to maximise local content, the fit-out was conducted at Comeng's Dry Creek facility. The first commenced testing in May 1987, entering service in November 1987. The eight 3000s were built first with the first 3100 class completed in mid-1988. The last entered service in December 1988.

In the original contract, there was an option to order 76 further examples. However, Comeng came back to the STA with a significantly higher price, so the work was put out to tender, and a contract for 50 was awarded to Clyde Engineering in November 1989. Comeng concluded a deal to sell the 3000 class design and tooling. However, by the time construction commenced, Comeng had sold its Dandenong plant to ABB, who backed away from an agreement to hand over the jigs and tooling, so they were built between 1992 and 1996 by Clyde Engineering's Martin & King factory in Somerton, Victoria.

All were delivered with unpainted stainless steel offset by blue and orange stripes. In April 2002, the first was repainted by Bluebird Rail Operations in Adelaide Metro's yellow, blue and red.

Originally they operated on all Adelaide suburban lines, however since the electrification of the Seaford and Flinders lines in 2014 and Gawler line in 2022, they have been confined primarily to the Belair, Grange, and Outer Harbor lines along with the newly opened Port Dock line. They have on occasion ventured beyond the Adelaide metropolitan area, operating special services to Nuriootpa on the Barossa Valley line, Riverton on the Roseworthy-Peterborough line and Balaklava on the Hamley Bridge–Gladstone line. These tours stopped by the mid-2000s.

== Mechanics ==
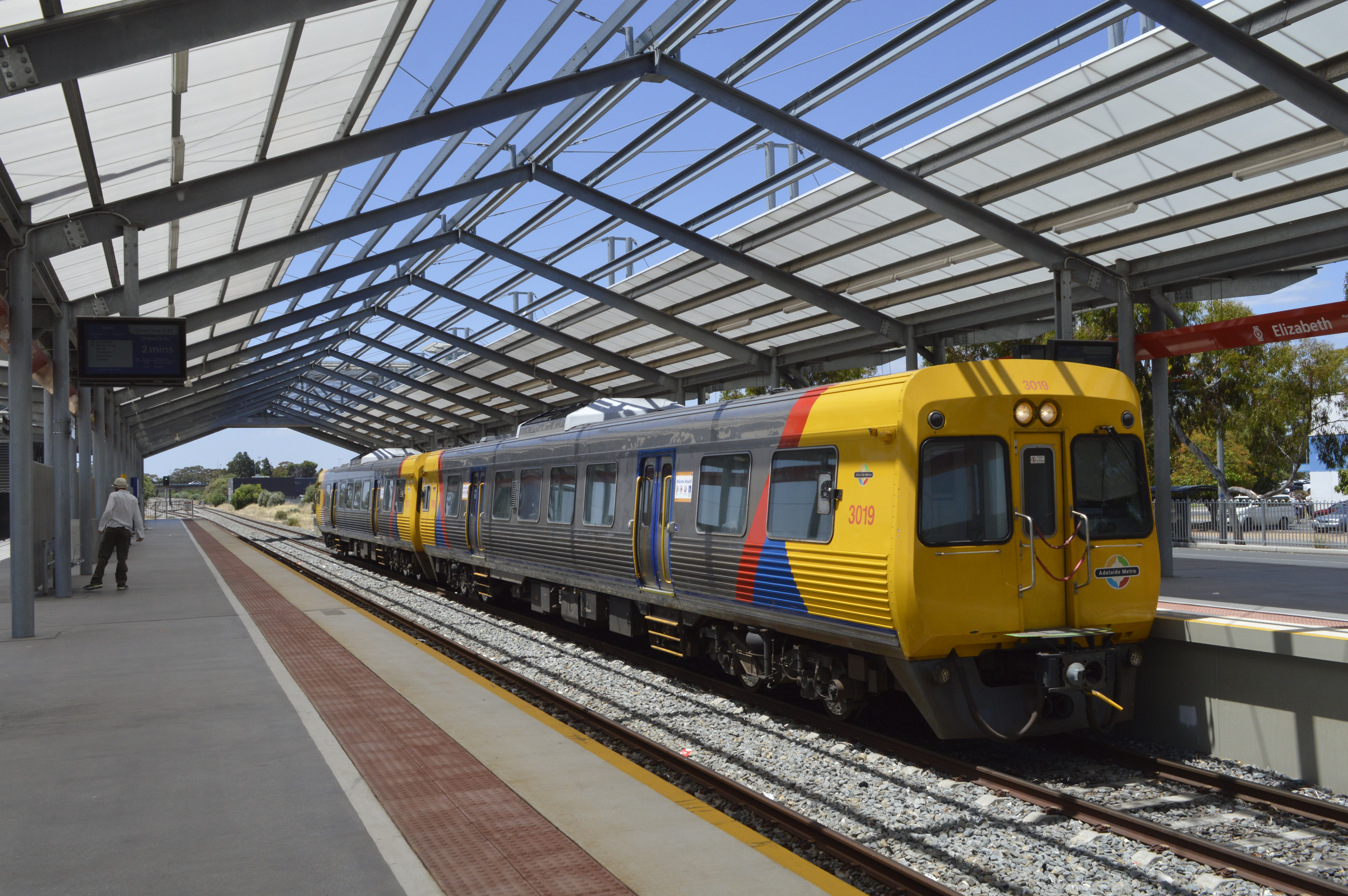
3019 repainted in Adelaide Metro's yellow blue and red livery, as part of the fleet's first refurbishment

Only one of bogies is powered per car, originally with 2 Stromberg Electric Motors, which have now been replaced since the 2018 life extension.

The 3000 class bodies were built by Comeng and feature airbag secondary suspension. All 3000 class railcars are fitted with electro-magnetic track brakes, which are comparatively rare on trains, though they are commonly found on trams. These are operated separately from the normal mechanical and dynamic braking.

Trains are equipped with automatic Scharfenberg couplers which are operated from the driver's cab. Coupling operations are sometimes performed at Adelaide station, requiring an extra staff member to flag the driver as well as to connect the safety chains. This feature allows sets of up to six cars to be formed.

Two headlights are mounted at the top of the car in the centre on driver's cab ends. There are no marker lights at the front; however, there are red marker lights for the rear located on the upper corners. There are metal steps up the side of the car to each door, but they are not used by passengers, however in emergency situations, they may be used to allow passengers to disembark from the train. They are illuminated by lights at night. All cars are air-conditioned.

During May 2020, 50 out of 70 railcars were taken out of service on the Gawler, Belair and Outer Harbor rail lines due to a significant mechanical fault regarding the servicing of the cars. These trains were out of service for 2 weeks whilst servicing on the turbochargers and other defective parts were repaired/replaced, therefore, a decision was made by DPTI to shift all affected train services to a weekend timetable. The Seaford and Flinders lines were not affected due to electrification having been completed on those lines in early 2014. During these critical repairs, the Grange line was closed.

By 2024, 50 of the 70 railcars are in process of being converted into hybrid trains with a new ABB traction battery technology to reduce noise and emissions to improve the travel experience. The program was completed by January 2025.

As of around mid to late 2025, newer and more modern MetroCard validators were installed on all trains. These new validators do not include a physical ticket acceptor, as a result Adelaide Metro no longer accepts or sells paper tickets.

== Refurbishments ==
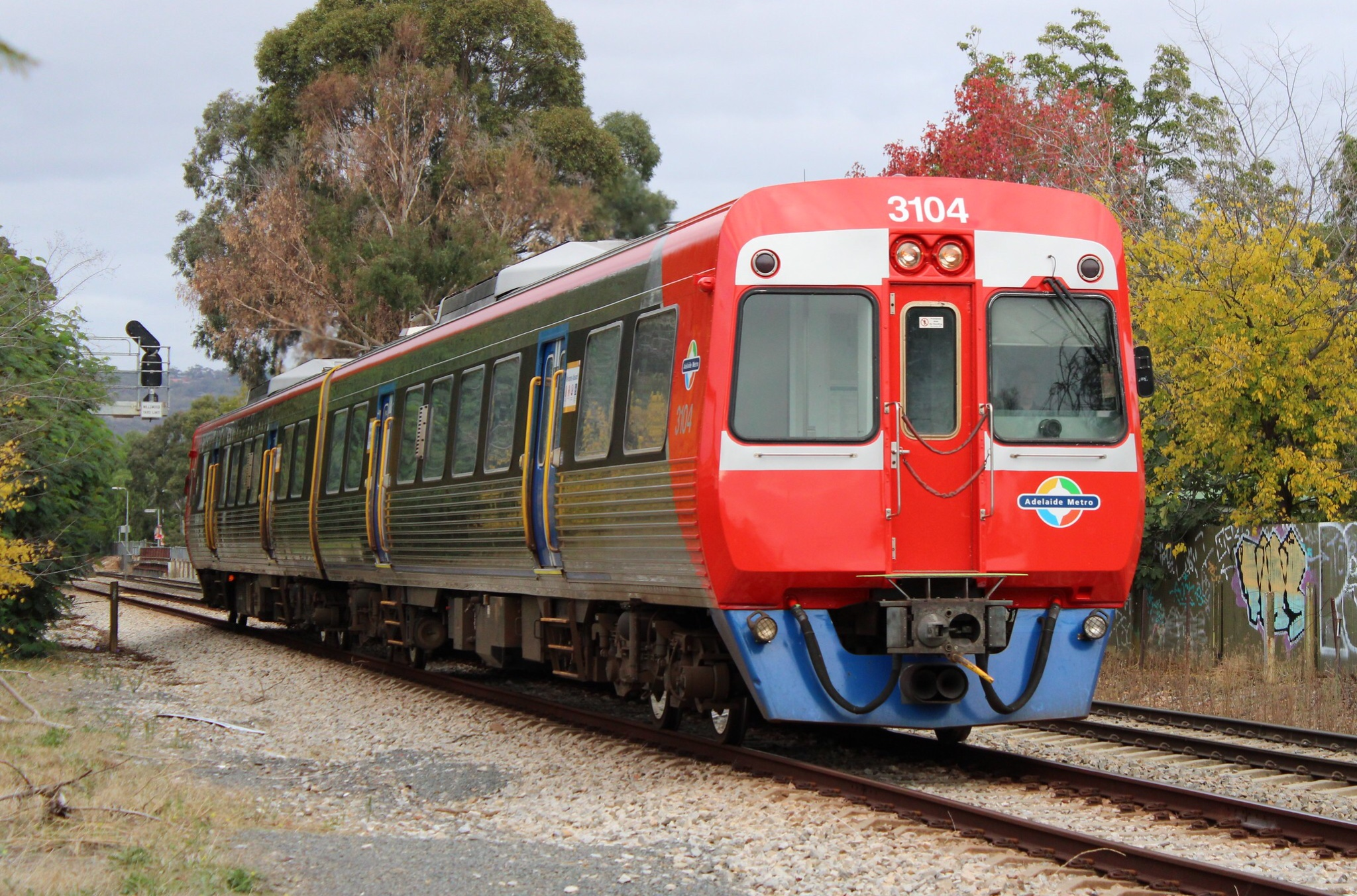
3103/3104 in their third refurbished guise

In the 2008/09 State Budget, it was announced that five out of six of Adelaide's railway lines were to be electrified commencing with the Noarlunga and Gawler lines. This was to have resulted in 58 of the 3000/3100 class railcars being converted to electric operation with the remaining 12 to be retained as diesels for operation on the Belair line. However, with the electrification project scaled back and the additional orders of the 4000 class trains, the conversions were cancelled.

Commencing in April 2018, all 3000/3100 series railcars began a life extension program which included new Mercedes-Benz engines, upgraded bogies, enhanced upholstery and a repaint into a red and blue livery similar to the 4000 class units. The modernised livery features silver borders around the headlights and tail lights to allow for better illumination throughout light hours.

Starting from May 2021, Adelaide Metro began to gradually refurbish the interior of 50 of its 3000/3100 class railcars.

The 2021 refurbishment includes:

- brighter lights.
- new wheelchair spaces to provide room for two wheelchairs.
- new floor materials designed for better graffiti cleaning, removal of existing graffiti, and deep interior cleaning.
- creation of five new "bike-friendly" railcars with realigned seating, to be used primarily on the Belair Line which is frequented by cyclists.

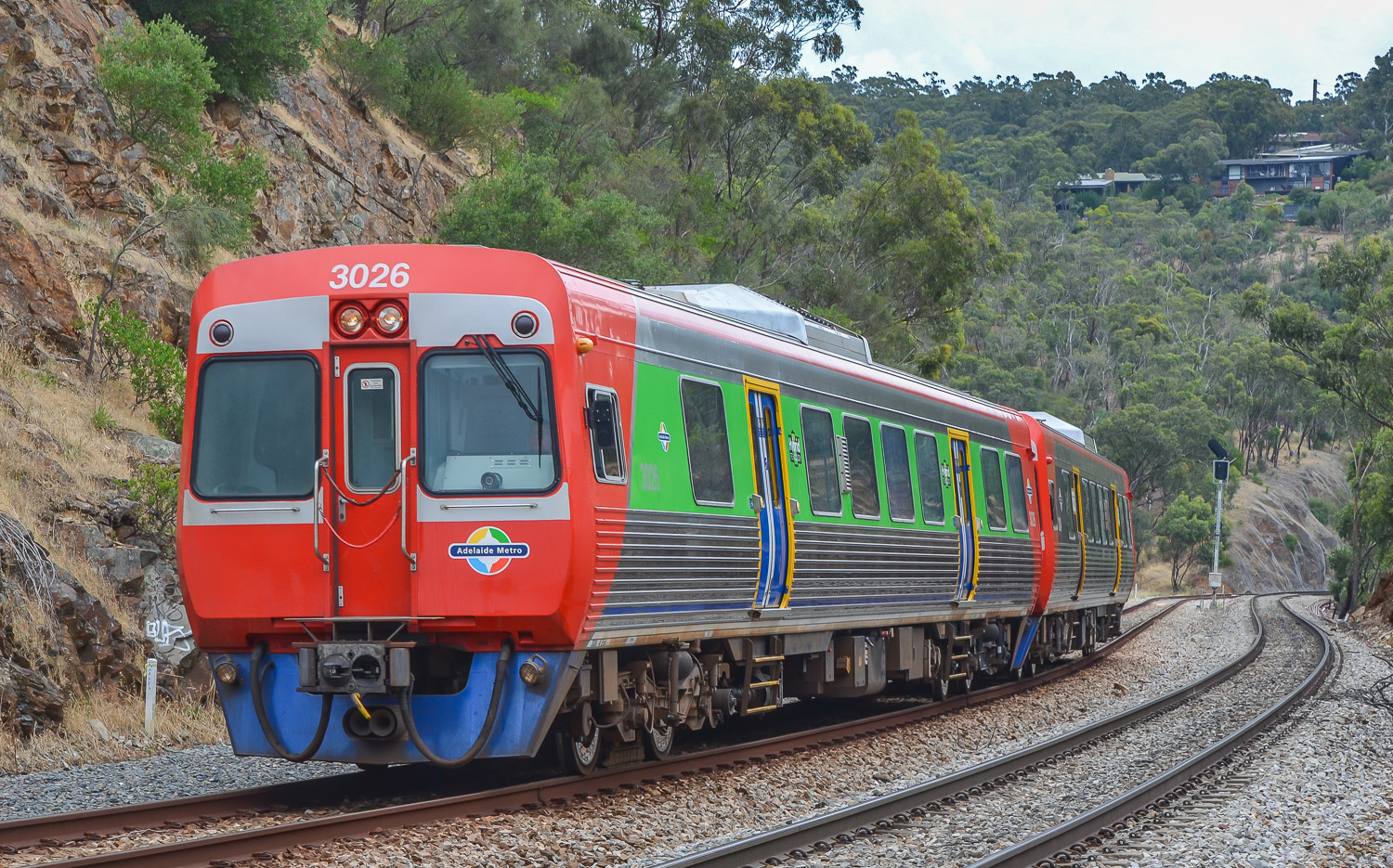
3026 after receiving the hybrid upgrade with the green branding

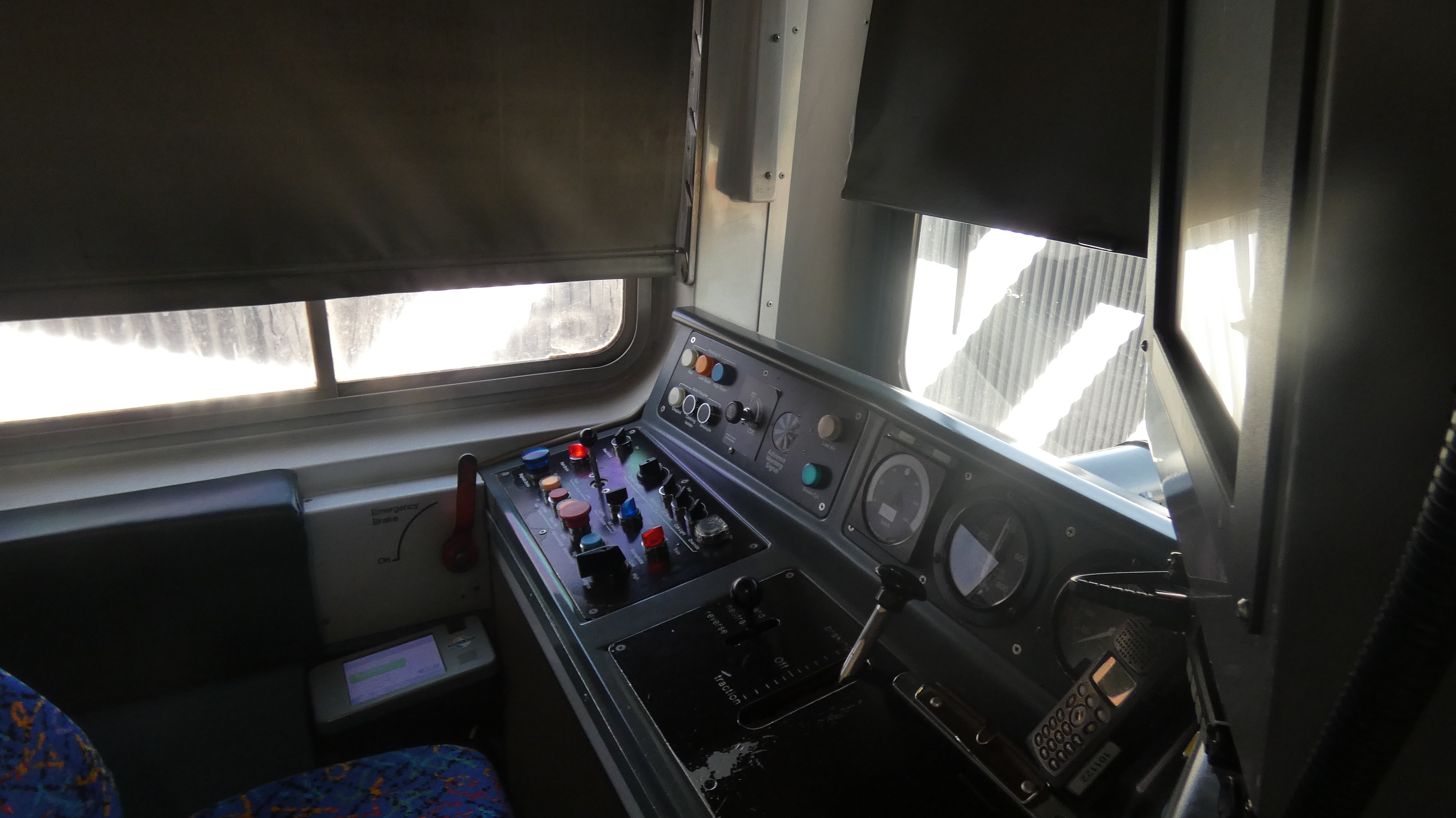
3000 class railcar driver's cab

In addition to the interior refurbishment, 50 of Adelaide Metro's 70 railcars have been fitted with ABB hybrid battery technology by 2024. This includes the installation of a new energy storage and recovery system, which stores kinetic energy in a battery during braking. This will reduce fuel consumption on the 3000/3100 class fleet, and reduce emissions, particularly at the enclosed Adelaide railway station, where 3000 class railcars are often left idling with their engine running when not in service. Adelaide Metro have previously indicated that following the completion of this project, and once 3000/3100 class railcars are no longer required on the Gawler line, non-upgraded railcars in the fleet will be retired, as only 50 railcars will be required for service. The hybrid-conversion program was completed in January 2025 with the final train being converted into hybrid. The last diesel-only railcars ran their final service on 31 December 2024.

As of May 2025, several of the single unit 3000 class are being converted to permanently coupled sets, with the cab saloon removed on one end of the railcar, usually the one connected to the other railcar to allow gangway access. The first railcars to receive this treatment were 3030 and 3025.

== Fleet status ==
The status of the fleet is shown in the table.

Railcar	Status
3001	Retired
3002	Retired
3003	Retired
3004	Retired
3005	Retired
3006	Retired
3007	Retired
3008	Retired
3009	Operational, hybrid-converted
3010	Operational, hybrid-converted
3011	Operational, hybrid-converted
3012	Operational, hybrid-converted
3013	Operational, hybrid-converted
3014	Operational, Bike Friendly Railcar, hybrid-converted, connected with 3026
3015	Operational, hybrid-converted, connected with 3024
3016	Operational, hybrid-converted, connected with 3027
3017	Operational, hybrid-converted
3018	Operational, Bike Friendly Railcar, hybrid-converted, connected with 3028
3019	Operational, hybrid-converted
3020	Operational, hybrid-converted
3021	Operational, hybrid-converted
3022	Operational, Bike Friendly Railcar, hybrid-converted, connected with 3029
3023	Operational, hybrid-converted
3024	Operational, hybrid-converted, connected with 3015
3025	Operational, Bike Friendly Railcar, hybrid-converted, connected with 3030
3026	Operational, hybrid-converted, connected with 3014
3027	Operational, hybrid-converted, connected with 3016
3028	Operational, hybrid-converted, connected with 3018
3029	Operational, hybrid-converted, connected with 3022
3030	Operational, hybrid-converted, connected with 3025
3101	Damaged in an accident at Grange, Retired
3102	Damaged in an accident at Grange, Retired
3103	Retired
3104	Retired
3105	Retired
3106	Retired
3107	Retired
3108	Retired
3109	Retired
3110	Retired
3111	Retired
3112	Retired
3113	Operational, hybrid-converted
3114	Operational, hybrid-converted
3115	Operational, hybrid-converted
3116	Operational, hybrid-converted
3117	Operational, hybrid-converted
3118	Operational, hybrid-converted
3119	Operational, hybrid-converted
3120	Operational, hybrid-converted
3121	Operational, hybrid-converted
3122	Operational, hybrid-converted
3123	Operational, hybrid-converted
3124	Operational, hybrid-converted
3125	Operational, hybrid-converted
3126	Operational, hybrid-converted
3127	Operational, hybrid-converted
3128	Operational, hybrid-converted
3129	Operational, hybrid-converted
3130	Operational, hybrid-converted
3131	Operational, hybrid-converted
3132	Operational, hybrid-converted
3133	Operational, hybrid-converted
3134	Operational, hybrid-converted, Bike Friendly Railcar
3135	Operational, hybrid-converted
3136	Operational, hybrid-converted
3137	Operational, hybrid-converted
3138	Operational, hybrid-converted
3139	Operational, hybrid-converted
3140	Operational, hybrid-converted
