= 2000 class railcar =

Railcars of suburban Adelaide

2000 and 2100 class railcars
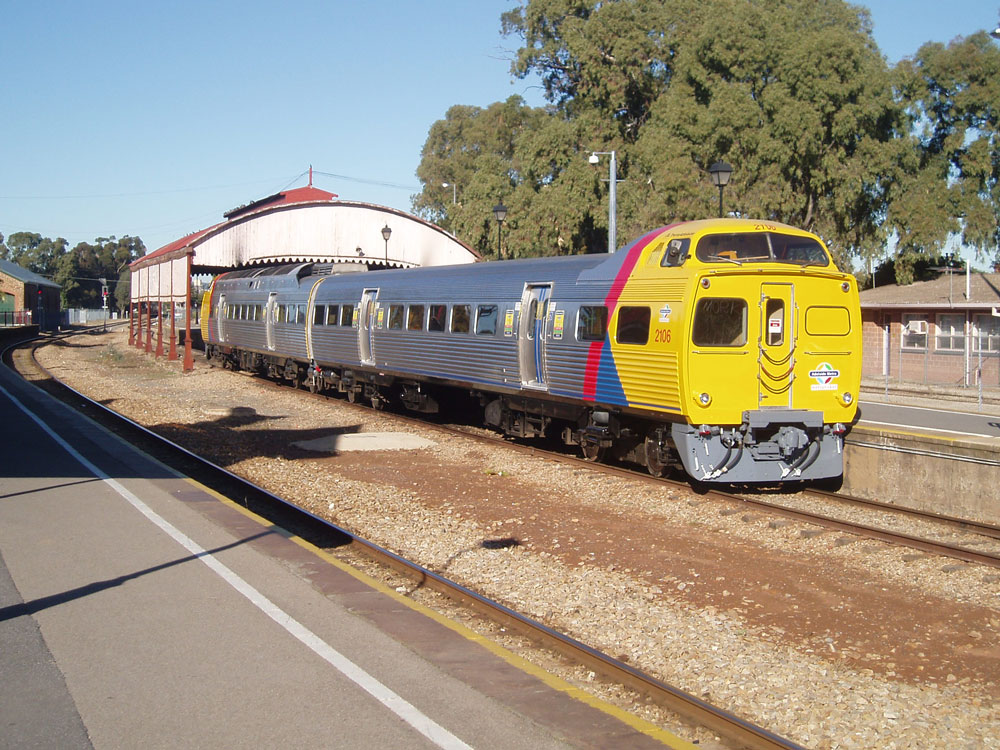
- Adelaide Metro liveried 2011 & 2106 at Gawler station in June 2005
- Stock type: Diesel Multiple Unit
- Manufacturer: Comeng
- Built at: Granville, New South Wales
- Constructed: 1978–1980
- Entered service: February 1980
- Retired: August 2015
- Scrapped: June 2016
- Number built: 30
- Number preserved: 4
- Number scrapped: 24
- Successor: 4000 class
- Formation: 2–4 carriages
- Fleet numbers: 2001–2012, 2101–2118
- Capacity: 70 (2000); 100 (2100)
- Operators: State Transport Authority; TransAdelaide; Adelaide Metro
- Depot: Dry Creek

Specifications
- Car length: 24.8 m (81 ft 4 in)
- Width: 3.19 m (10 ft 6 in)
- Height: 4.27 m (14 ft 0 in)
- Maximum speed: 130 km/h (81 mph) (design); 90 km/h (56 mph) (service)
- Weight: 2000: 65 t (64 long tons; 72 short tons); 2100: 42 t (41 long tons; 46 short tons)
- Prime movers: As built: 2 × MAN D3650s; After repowering: 2 × Cummins KTA 19Rs
- Power output: As built: 2 × 377 kW (506 hp); After repowering: 2 × 390 kW (520 hp)
- Transmission: Voith T420r Diesel Hydraulic
- Auxiliaries: Rolls-Royce SF65CT
- UIC classification: Power cars: B′B′ Trailers: 2'2'
- Track gauge: 1,600 mm (5 ft 3 in)

The 2000 class and 2100 class were diesel multiple units that operated on the Adelaide rail network between 1980 and 2015. They were built by Comeng in Granville, New South Wales in 1979–1980. As of 2024, six railcars have been preserved while the rest have been scrapped.

== History ==
The 2000 and 2100 class were self-propelled diesel railcars operated by the State Transport Authority and its successors on the Adelaide rail network. The body shell design was based on the Budd SPV-2000, Metroliner and Amfleet cars, but the 2000 class railcars have a slightly different curve to the Amfleet cars.

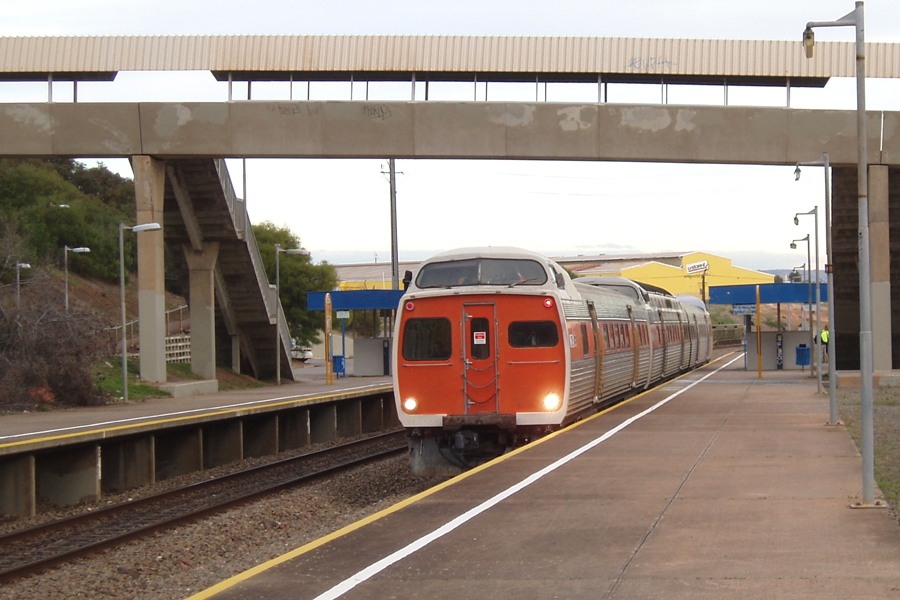
2000 class

Twelve 2000 powercars and eighteen 2100 class trailer cars were built. The bodyshells were built by Comeng in Granville. Two (2001 and 2101) were completed at Granville while the remainder were railed to Adelaide via Lithgow and Broken Hill to comply with a contractual requirement to maximise local content, the fit out being conducted by Comeng's Aresco subsidiary at Dry Creek. The first delivery took place in late October 1979 and entered service on 22 February 1980. Delivery of the trains continued until August 1981.

They were nicknamed Jumbos owing to the raised driving cab, similar to the distinctive hump of the Boeing 747 jumbo jet. This raised cab was designed to meet Australian Federated Union of Locomotive Employees demands for a full-width driver's cab whilst allowing inter-carriage doors to be fitted.

The powercars were originally powered by V12 turbocharged MAN D3650 engines that were replaced by two turbocharged 6 cylinder Cummins engines under the floor driving a Voith hydraulic transmission in the late 1980s. They usually operated in 2-car (power-trailer) or 3-car (trailer-power-trailer) configurations. It was originally intended that they primarily operate express services on the Gawler and Noarlunga Centre lines with the existing Redhens operating the all stops services, but they quickly ended up operating services across the network.

Six were stored for a number of years, being returned to traffic in 2007. One was sent to Bombardier Transportation's Dandenong factory in 2006 to assess the feasibility of a life extension program, but it was deemed not worthwhile. They did on occasions venture beyond the Adelaide metropolitan area, operating special services to Tanunda and Nuriootpa on the Barossa Valley line, however these excursions ended in April 2003.

From 23 February 2014, these railcars were no longer permitted to operate on the Belair, Tonsley (now Flinders) and Seaford lines due to low clearances as a result of the electrification of these lines, being restricted to the Gawler Central, Grange and Outer Harbor lines. Withdrawals commenced in late 2014. By 2015 only 11 cars were still in service and only operated peak hour express services and special event extra services such as Adelaide Oval event trains on the Gawler Central line and occasionally on the Outer Harbor line. The remaining fleet members was retired in August 2015 after running services between Gawler Central and Adelaide and were stored at the Dry Creek Railcar depot for 10 months before removal.

== Preservation ==
Four have been preserved, however as of 2025, none are operating:

- 2006 and 2112 were delivered to National Railway Museum, Port Adelaide via rail
- 2010 and 2109 were delivered to SteamRanger Heritage Railway via road.

2009 and 2104 were donated to the South Australian Metropolitan Fire Service for use in training exercises. The rest were sent by road and scrapped in June 2016 at Simsmetal.

== See also ==
- 183 series also featured a similar cab design
- NS Intercity Materieel which also features a raised cab
