= Transitplus =

- Parent: Australian Transit Enterprises (50%); TransAdelaide (50%)
- Founded: 24 September 1995
- Ceased operation: 30 June 2010
- Headquarters: Aldgate
- Service area: Adelaide
- Service type: Bus services
- Depots: 2
- Fleet: 66 (2010)
- Website: www.transitplus.com.au

Transitplus, formerly Hills Transit, was an Australian bus service operator in Adelaide. It operated services as part of the Adelaide Metro network under contract to the Department of Planning, Transport & Infrastructure. It was a 50/50 joint venture between Australian Transit Enterprises and TransAdelaide.

== History ==
Hills Transit was founded in 1995 during the privatisation of TransAdelaide's bus network as a joint venture between TransAdelaide and Australian Transit Enterprises operating services from the Adelaide central business district to the Adelaide Hills. In May 2000 it was renamed Transitplus.

Following the winding up of TransAdelaide on 30 June 2010, Australian Transit Enterprises took full ownership and integrated Transitplus into its SouthLink operation.

== Fleet ==
At the time operations ceased in 2010, it operated a fleet of 66 buses.

== Depots ==
Transitplus operated out of its main depot in Aldgate with a sub depot in Mount Barker
