= TransAdelaide =

Former South Australian Government transport agency

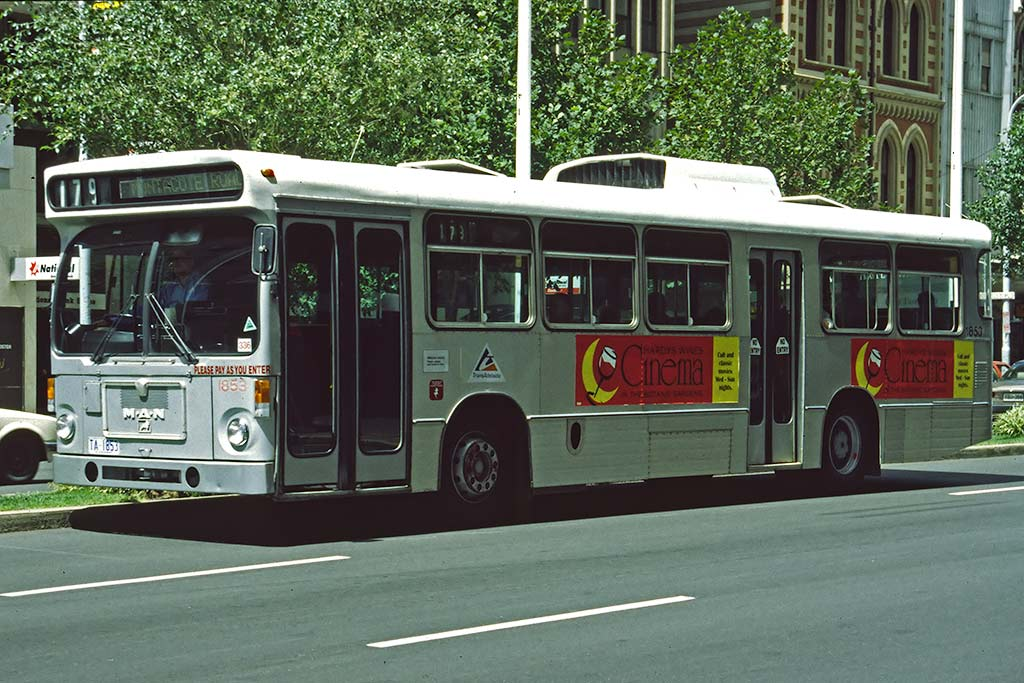
- A Pressed Metal Corporation South Australia bodied MAN SL200 ca. 1997

Government owned corporation overview
- Formed: 4 July 1994
- Preceding Government owned corporation: State Transport Authority
- Dissolved: 31 August 2010
- Superseding Government owned corporation: Department of Planning, Transport & Infrastructure, branded as Adelaide Metro
- Jurisdiction: Adelaide
- Headquarters: Adelaide
- Employees: 729 (June 2010)
- Website: www.transadelaide.com.au

TransAdelaide was a publicly owned cooperation in Adelaide, South Australia, and operated the city's suburban rail, tram and bus services. It took responsibilities from the State Transport Authority in July 1994.

== History ==
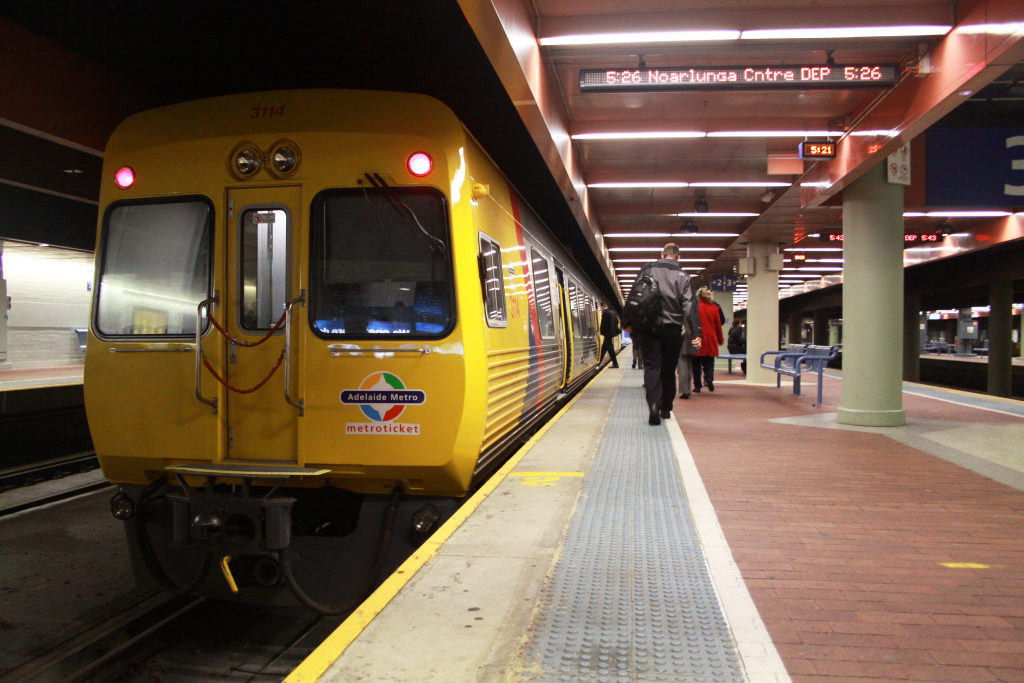
TransAdelaide 3000 class railcar at Adelaide

In June 1994, the government-owned agency State Transport Authority was dissolved (and the 1974 Act repealed) as a consequence of the Passenger Transport Act 1994. These reforms split the STA into the Passenger Transport Board, which coordinated and funded the public transport system, and TransAdelaide, which actually operated metropolitan buses, trains and trams. The formation of TransAdelaide was a prelude to competitive tendering and the introduction of private operators into the Adelaide public transport network.

In April 2000, all metropolitan bus routes were transferred from TransAdelaide to private companies Serco, SouthLink and Torrens Transit and a joint venture of TransAdelaide (with Southlink) known as Transitplus. It continued to operate rail services under the Adelaide Metro brand. It was abolished in August 2010, with its staff and functions transferred to the newly created Office of the Rail Commissioner.

== Operations ==
TransAdelaide operated the suburban rail services on the Noarlunga, Gawler, Outer Harbor, Belair, Tonsley and Grange lines, in addition to maintaining the stations along the lines. The rail services were provided by a fleet of 70 3000 class diesel railcars and 30 2000 class railcars. TransAdelaide inherited some Redhen railcars from the State Transport Authority. The final units were retired in October 1996. It also operated Adelaide's last remaining tram service, the Glenelg Light Rail tram line from Victoria Square to the seaside suburb of Glenelg.

=== Tram revival ===
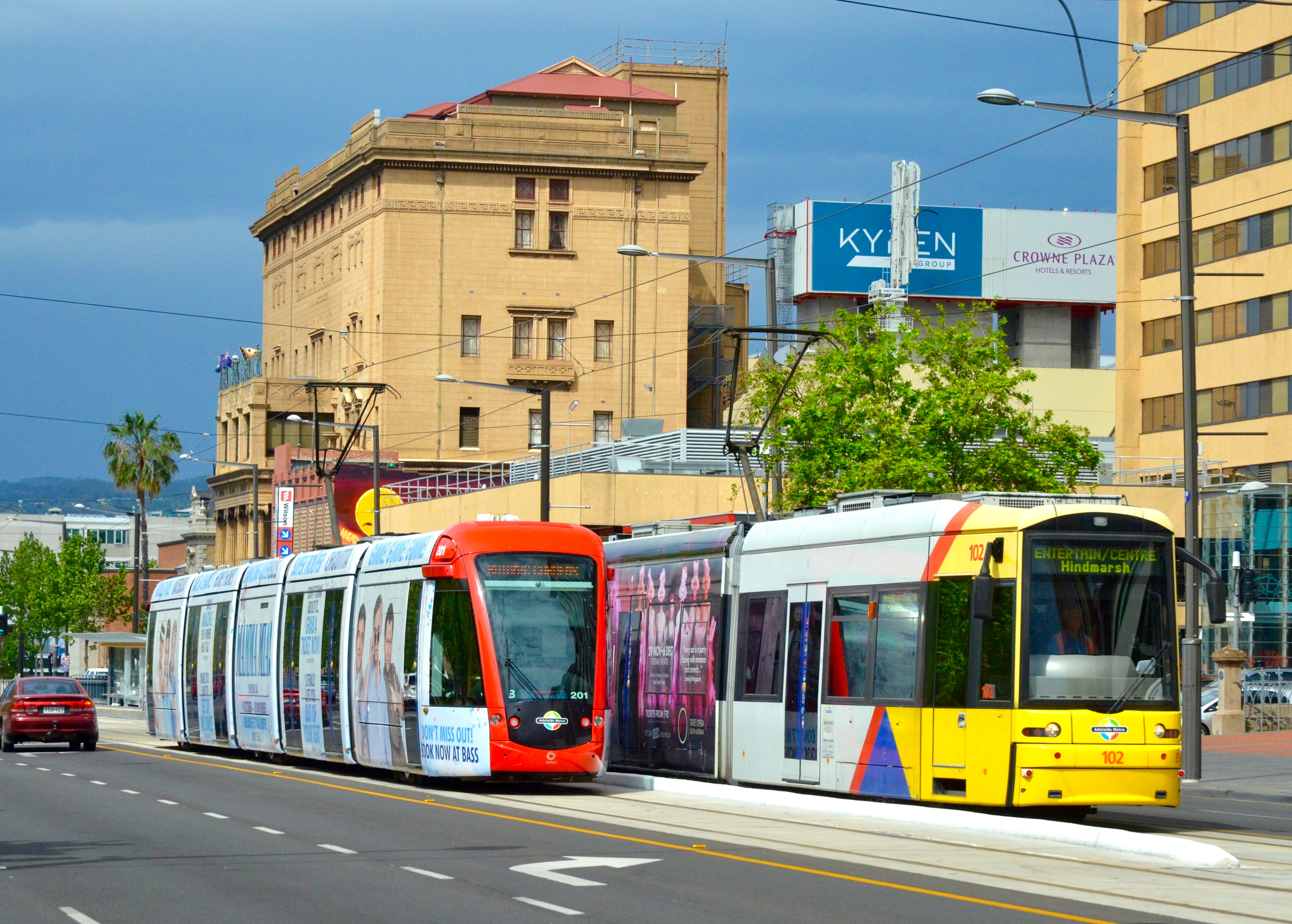
Flexity Classic and Alstom Citadis trams on the North Terrace route to the Botanic Garden, near the intersection with Pulteney Street

For 77 years, Type H trams were the mainstay of the Glenelg tram line. They operated after the line was converted from a steam railway to an electrified tramway in 1929. In the 21st century, a series of investments were made to improve and extend the line, beginning in May 2003 when the South Australian Government announced an upgrade of the Glenelg line infrastructure and the introduction of new trams.

Major work to upgrade the line took place between 5 June and 7 August 2005. Concrete sleepers were installed and much of the track renewed in an intensive nine-week project. Most of the 21 tram stops were reconstructed with higher platforms to allow level access to the new low-floor trams. The overhead electrical supply was upgraded, and some minor modifications were made to the Type H trams and Glengowrie depot. Tram services were replaced with substitute bus services during this period. The terminus at Moseley Square was reconfigured in September 2005 as part of a general redevelopment of the square. An extension opened to the new City West terminus on 14 October 2007. An overpass crossing South Road was announced in the 2007 South Australian Budget. The project was built in conjunction with the Anzac Highway Underpass. Construction by McConnell Dowell commenced in July 2009. On 8 December 2009, the overpass opened to allow trams to pass over it, however the South Road tram stop was not operational until 15 March 2010. Another new extension was opened to the Adelaide Entertainment Centre on 11 May 2009. Testing began in February 2010 and the extension opened on 22 March 2010.

== Rail fleet ==
Between 1994 and 2010, TransAdelaide operated the following classes of rail vehicles.

Class	Image	Type	Top speed				Number	Routes operated	Built
Class	Image	Type	mph	km/h	Limit mph/h	Limit km/h	Number	Routes operated	Built
2000 Jumbos		Diesel multiple unit	87	140	56	90	11	Gawler, Grange, Noarlunga Centre, Outer Harbor, Tonsley	1980
2100 Jumbos		Control car	87	140	56	90	18	Gawler, Grange, Noarlunga Centre, Outer Harbor, Tonsley	1980
3000		Diesel-electric multiple unit	87	140	56	90	30	All non-tram routes	1987–
3100		Diesel-electric multiple unit	87	140	56	90	40	All non-tram routes	1988–96
Flexity Classic		Tram	--	--	37	60	15	Glenelg–City–Hindmarsh	2006
Alstom Citadis		Tram	--	--	37	60	6; 3	Glenelg–City–Hindmarsh	2009; 2017
