= SouthLink =

Bus service operator in Adelaide, South Australia

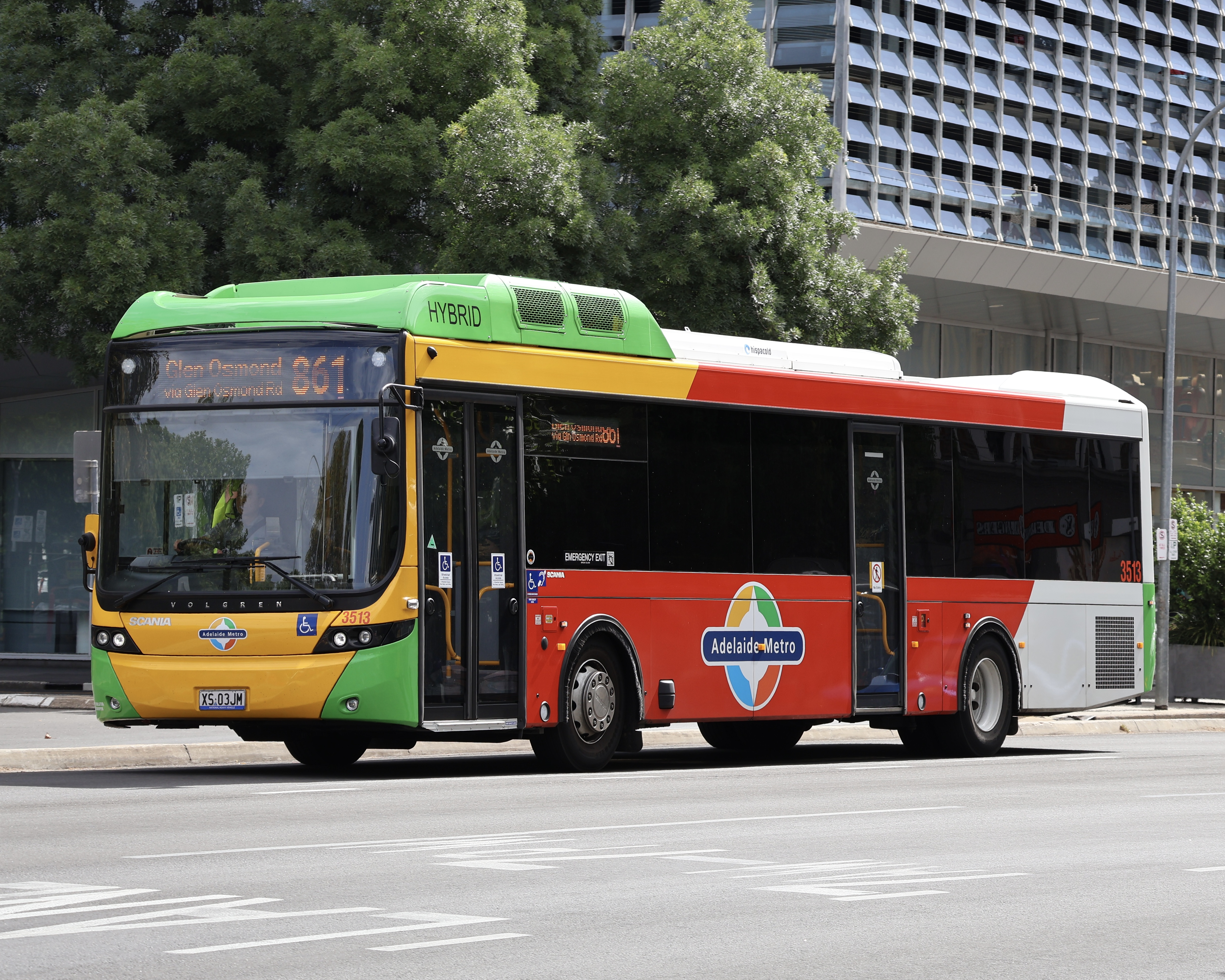
- Volgren bodied Scania K320HB on Grenfell Street in December 2025
- Parent: Keolis
- Founded: April 2000
- Headquarters: Mount Barker
- Service area: Adelaide
- Service type: Bus services
- Alliance: LinkSA
- Depots: 2
- Fleet: 94 (August 2025)
- Website: www.keolisdowner.southlink.com.au

SouthLink is an Australian bus service operator in Adelaide. It operates services as part of the Adelaide Metro network under contract to the Department for Infrastructure & Transport. It is a subsidiary of Keolis.

== History ==
In April 2000, Australian Transit Enterprises (ATE) won a contract to operate its Adelaide Metro Outer South services, with 82 buses. The service was named SouthLink. ATE also formed a joint venture with TransAdelaide to operate Adelaide Hills area services under the Transitplus name.

In April 2005, SouthLink began operating the Outer North Adelaide Metro contract that had previously been run by Serco. In 2010, following the dissolution of its Transitplus partner TransAdelaide, ATE took over full operation of the Adelaide Hills area services and also operated them as SouthLink.

In July 2011, SouthLink began an eight-year contract for the Outer North, Outer South and Hills areas, with an optional four-year extension exercisable based upon performance criteria.

In March 2015, SouthLink was included in the purchase of ATE by Keolis Downer.

In July 2020, SouthLink's Outer North and Outer South bus contracts were taken over by Torrens Transit and Busways respectively, while retaining its Hills contract.

== Fleet ==
As of August 2025, the fleet consisted of 84 buses.

== Depots ==
SouthLink operates two depots in Aldgate and Mount Barker.
