= Path Transit =

Australian bus company

- Parent: Keolis
- Founded: 29 September 1996
- Headquarters: Malaga
- Service area: Geraldton; Perth
- Service type: Bus services
- Depots: 7
- Fleet: 384 (July 2020)
- Website: www.keolisdowner.path.com.au

Path Transit is an Australian bus company operating bus services under contract to the Public Transport Authority under the TransGeraldton and Transperth brands. It is a subsidiary of Keolis.

== History ==
On 29 September 1996, Path Transit commenced operating services in the Marmion and Wanneroo areas from depots in Joondalup and Karrinyup with 191 Mercedes-Benz and Renault buses.

In January 1998, Path Transit gained further services in the Joondalup North area followed on 5 July 1998 by services in the Morley area. In 1998, a new depot was opened in Wangara. In May 2011, Path Transit lost the Joondalup contract area to Transdev WA and lost the Marmion area to Swan Transit, but retained operation of the Morley contract area. However, in October the following year, Path Transit took over the Kalamunda contract from Swan Transit.

In 2011, the TransGoldfields contract was awarded to Path Transit.

In March 2015, Keolis Downer clinched a $163 million deal to acquire Path Transit's private parent company Australian Transit Enterprises.

In October 2019, Path secured a 10-year contract to operate TransGeraldton bus services.

As of November 2020, Path Transit continues to operate the Kalamunda and Morley area contracts.

In 2021, the TransGoldfields contract was lost to Swan Transit.

As of January 2026 Path Transit rebranded as Keolis.

== Depots ==
Path Transit operates eight depots in total at Bayswater, Forrestfield, Henley Brook, Malaga, Redcliffe, Walliston, Welshpool, and Geraldton.

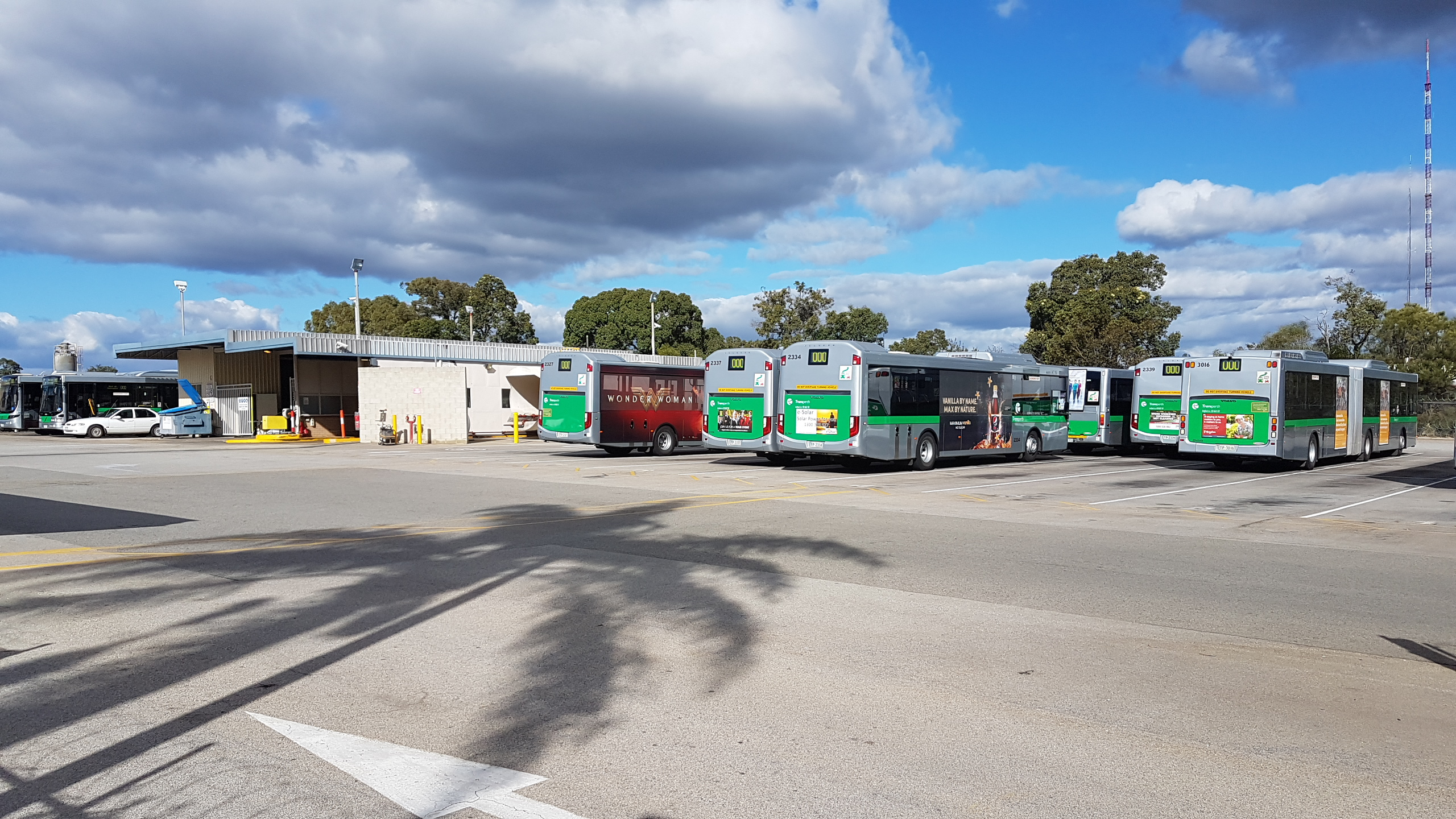
Walliston bus depot
