= Australian Transit Enterprises =

- Industry: Transport
- Founded: January 1996
- Defunct: March 2015
- Headquarters: Fortitude Valley, Australia
- Area served: Brisbane; Adelaide; Murray Bridge; Perth; Kalgoorlie
- Key people: Jonathon Cook (CEO)
- Products: Public transport
- Owner: Keolis Downer
- Subsidiaries: Hornibrook Bus Lines; LinkSA; Path Transit; SouthLink
- Website: www.ate.com.au

Australian Transit Enterprises was an Australian operator of bus services in Queensland, South Australia and Western Australia.

== History ==
Australian Transit Enterprises (ATE) was founded in 1995 when Hornibrook Bus Lines proprietor Geoff Mountjoy formed a joint venture with Melbourne bus proprietors; Joe Pulitano, Grenda Corporation and Kefford Corporation.

In January 1996 it commenced operating services in Perth under the Path Transit banner. This was followed in April 2000 by a contract (Outer South) in Adelaide under the SouthLink banner. At the same time, the Adelaide Hills operation contract was awarded to Transitplus, a joint venture between ATE with TransAdelaide. In April 2005 SouthLink was awarded an additional Adelaide contract (Outer North). In 2010, ATE took full control of the operation of the Hills contract, under the SouthLink brand. In July 2011, SouthLink's existing contracts were renewed for eight years.

It also operates the LinkSA coach business.

In 2012 Grenda Corporation sold its share in the business to the Mountjoy family. Kefford Corporation had previously sold its share. In March 2015, Keolis Downer purchased the business. As a result, ATE's subsidiaries were reorganised to be directly under the control of Keolis Downer.

Prior to the company's sale to Keolis Downer in March 2015, it had a total bus fleet of 930.
