= LinkSA =

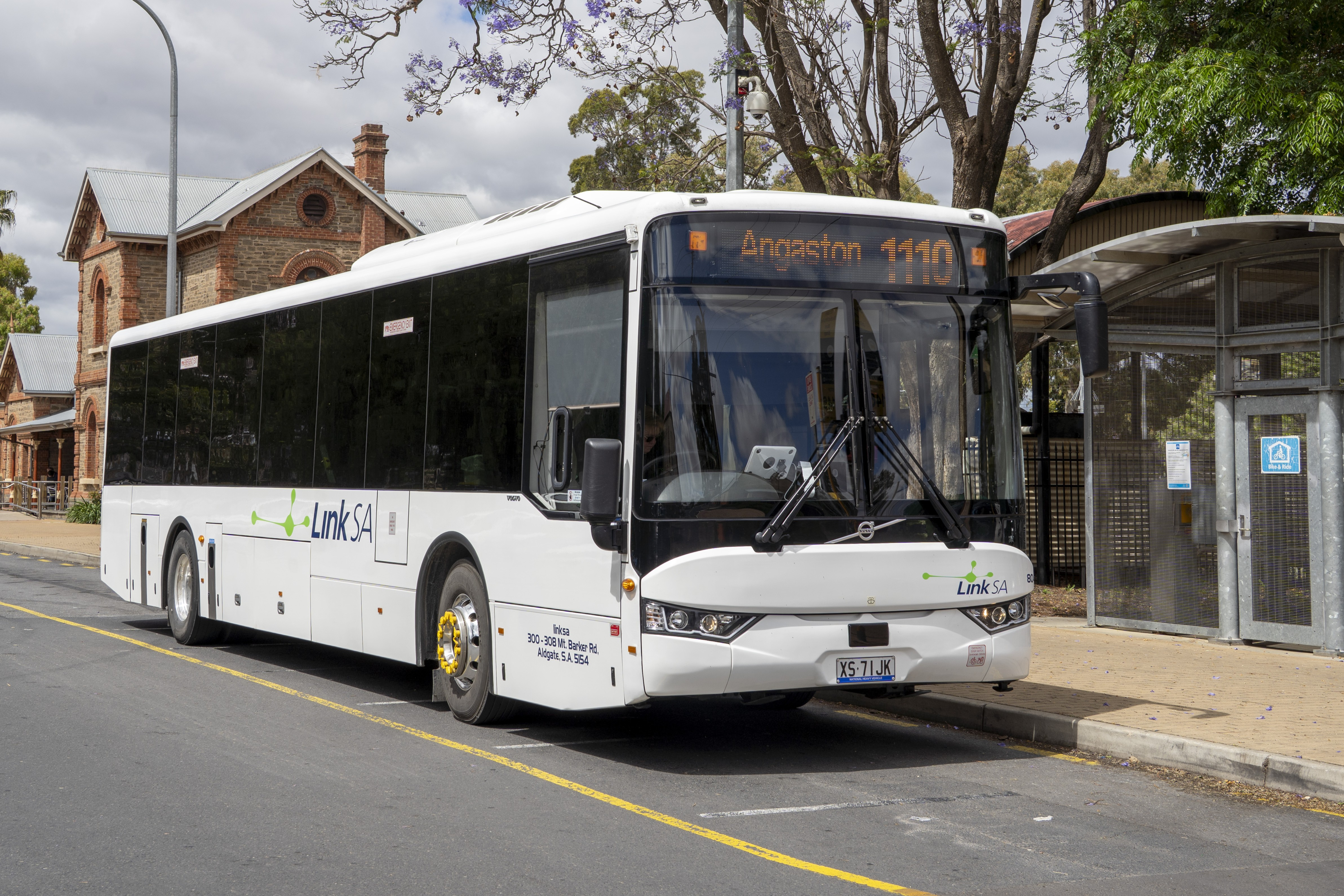
- BCI Citirider at Gawler railway station in November 2025
- Parent: Keolis
- Commenced operation: 2008
- Service area: Adelaide Hills; Barossa Valley; Mid Murray; Murraylands; Victor Harbor
- Service type: Bus services
- Alliance: SouthLink
- Fleet: 211 (November 2025)
- Website: www.linksa.com.au

LinkSA is a regional bus operator in South Australia. It is a subsidiary of Keolis.

== History ==
LinkSA was founded in 2008 when Australian Transit Enterprises purchased Barossa Valley Coaches and merged it with its Murray Bridge Passenger Services operation. In March 2015, it was included in the sale of Australian Transit Enterprises to Keolis Downer.

In June 2016 it took over the Goolwa to Adelaide via via Victor Harbor route from Premier Stateliner. In November 2017 Goolwa Bus & Coach was purchased with 28 vehicles and depots in Goolwa and Seaford.

In October 2023, LinkSA commenced operating new eight-year contracts to continue operating bus services in the Barossa Valley, Fleurieu Peninsula, Northern Adelaide Hills and Mount Gambier, with the potential to be extended to 2035.

== Services ==
LinkSA operates services in the Adelaide Hills, Barossa Valley, Mid Murray, Murraylands and Victor Harbor regions.

== Fleet ==
As of November 2025, the fleet comprised 211 buses.
