= O'Halloran Hill, South Australia =

O'Halloran Hill
- Suburb
- Country: Australia
- State: South Australia
- Region: Southern Adelaide
- City: Adelaide
- LGAs: City of Marion; City of Onkaparinga
- Location: 18 km (11 mi) from City-centre
- Established: 1838

Government
  - State electorate: Mitchell, Davenport, Fisher
  - Federal division: Boothby, Kingston

Population
  - Total: 2,722 (SAL 2021)
- Postcode: 5158
- County: Adelaide
Suburbs around O'Halloran Hill
Seaview Downs	Seacombe Heights	Darlington
Trott Park	O'Halloran Hill	Flagstaff Hill
Old Reynella	Reynella East	Happy Valley

O'Halloran Hill is a suburb in the south of Adelaide, South Australia, situated on the hills south of the O'Halloran Hill Escarpment, which rises from the Adelaide Plains and located 18 km from the city centre via the Main South Road. The suburb is split between the Cities of Marion and Onkaparinga, and it neighbours Happy Valley, Hallett Cove, Trott Park and Darlington. It includes a large area of former farmland and commercial vineyards known as the Glenthorne Estate, which in 2018 became the Glenthorne National Park–Ityamaiitpinna Yarta.

== History ==
Before British colonisation of South Australia, Kaurna Yerta Parngkarra (Kaurna tribal country) stretched from Cape Jervis in the south, to Crystal Brook in the north, west to the Mount Lofty Ranges, across to Gulf Saint Vincent, including the plains and city of Adelaide. An area on the north side of the hill was known as Wita-wattingga, meaning "in the midst of peppermint gums", as it was then covered in low woodland of Eucalyptus porosa and/or Eucalyptus odorata, known as mallee peppermint gums. The forested area named thus included the north-western slopes at South Brighton and Seaview Downs across to Seacliff Park and probably also included the area across the hill nearly as far as the present Main South Road.

Located on the foothills of the Mount Lofty Ranges and bordering the Adelaide plains, the suburb (and the hill) were named after Major Thomas O'Halloran, the first Police Commissioner of South Australia. O'Halloran was the second son of Major-General Sir Joseph O'Halloran. Majors Road, which runs through the suburb was also named in his honour.

During the early years there was conflict with the local Kaurna due to their tradition of burning off scrub in the foothills to encourage game, as the fires tended to cause considerable damage to local farmland. In an official report, O'Halloran claimed the Kaurna also used this as a weapon against the colonists by lighting fires to deliberately destroy fences, survey pegs and to scatter livestock. Due to this regular burning, the foothills' original stringybark forests had been largely replaced with grassland by the time the first Europeans arrived. Since the late 1960s, restrictions on subdivision and development have allowed regeneration of native trees and bush to a "natural" condition that would never have actually existed.

North of Majors Road and extending into the adjacent suburbs of Trott Park and Seaview Downs is the 293 hectares (720 acres) O'Halloran Hill Recreation Park which contains walking trails through remnant bush and farm ruins. East of Main South Road is a large area of privately owned land used for horse agistment.

West of South Road is 200 hectares (490 acres) of former farmland and commercial vineyards, Glenthorne Estate, originally a farm and horse stud owned by O'Halloran, who lived on a property nearby named Lizard Lodge. O'Halloran was buried in a cemetery situated on the western side of South Road, and his tomb can still be found there. At the beginning of World War I the property was purchased by the Australian Army to be used as a horse stud and army remount depot. In 1947 the Federal government took over the property and established the Glenthorne CSIRO Research Station which was closed in 1998 with the property subsequently sold to the State government. In 2001 the State government handed the property to the University of Adelaide for use as a vineyard and wine research facility in partnership with BRL Hardy, the world's largest wine company. In 2018 the Glenthorne property was transferred back to the State government to form Glenthorne National Park–Ityamaiitpinna Yarta.

O'Halloran Hill was also the former site of the Greater Union Drive-in known as the 'Star-line' which was the only drive-in theatre to overlook the lights of Adelaide, closing on the 4th of April 1984. Next to the drive-in was the Kingston TAFE College, which closed in 2014 and the site is now occupied by the IQRA Islamic College. From 1986 to 1998 the TAFE College was also home to community radio station Coast FM.

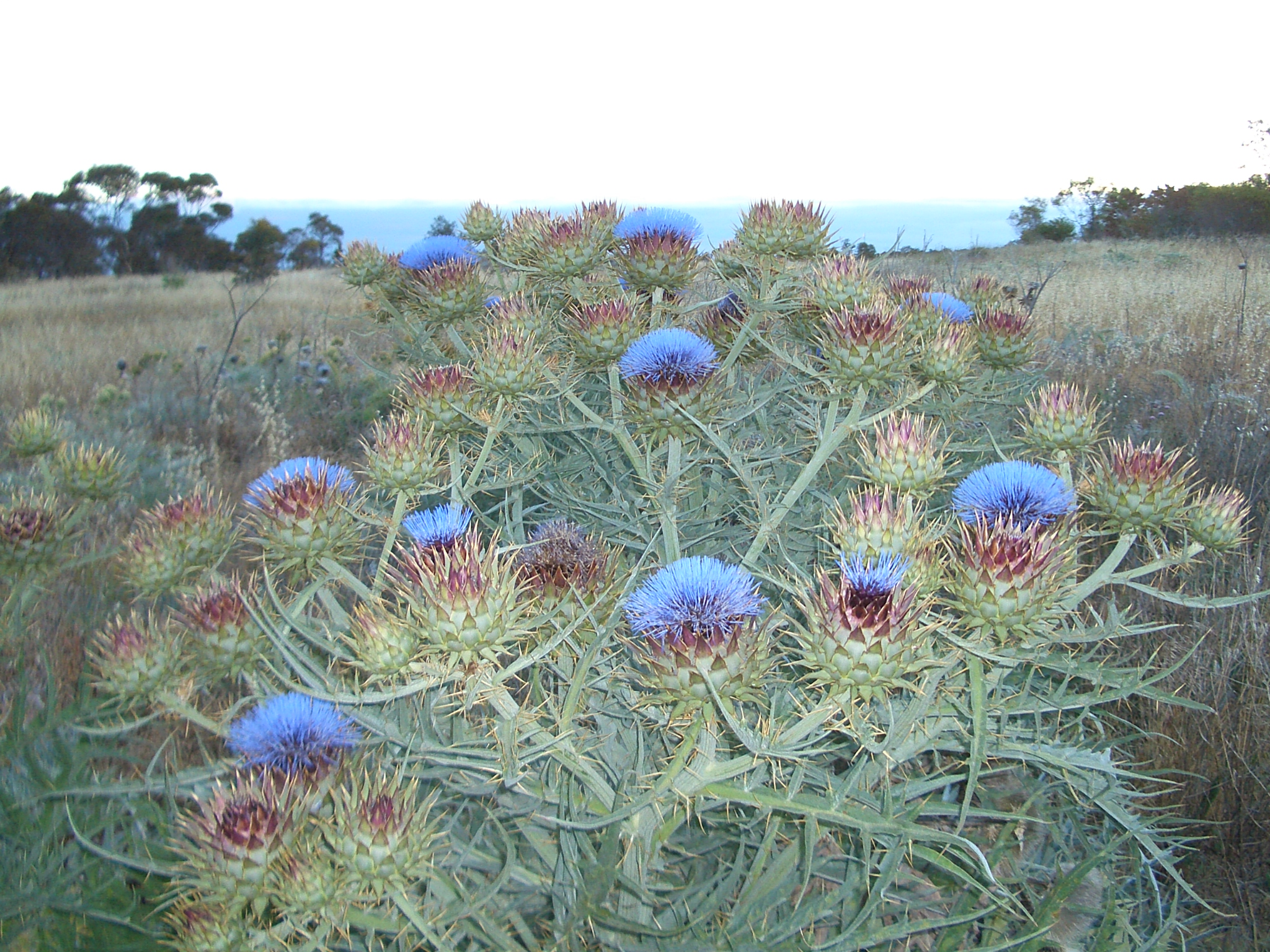
Thistle blooming near the Veloway on a reserve in O'Halloran Hill

== See also ==
- List of Adelaide suburbs
