= Seacliff Park, South Australia =

Southern suburb of Adelaide, Australia

Seacliff Park
- Suburb
- Country: Australia
- State: South Australia
- City: Adelaide
- LGAs: City of Holdfast Bay; City of Marion

Government
  - State electorate: Black
  - Federal division: Boothby

Population
  - Total: 2,644 (SAL 2021)
- Postcode: 5049
Suburbs around Seacliff Park
Seacliff	South Brighton	Dover Gardens
Kingston Park	Seacliff Park	Seaview Downs
Marino	Hallett Cove	Trott Park

Seacliff Park is a suburb of Adelaide partly in the City of Marion and the City of Holdfast Bay. The suburb is adjacent to South Brighton in the north, Seaview Downs to the east, Hallett Cove to the south, and Marino and Seacliff on the west. The suburb is divided diagonally by Ocean Road, with the northern part of the suburb mainly residential, and the southern park partly occupied by a golf course and a quarry.

Prior to the 1836 British colonisation of South Australia, the area was inhabited by the Kaurna people, who occupied the land from Cape Jervis in the south up the western side of the Fleurieu Peninsula, to Crystal Brook in the north, west to the Mount Lofty Ranges, across to Gulf Saint Vincent, including the Adelaide Plains and city of Adelaide.

The Kaurna name for the area was Wita-wattingga, or Wita-wita, was the Kaurna name of an area on the north side of O'Halloran Hill, which was then covered in low woodland of Eucalyptus porosa and/or Eucalyptus odorata known as mallee peppermint gums. The forested area named thus included the north-western slopes at South Brighton and Seaview Downs, across to Seacliff Park, and probably also included the area across the hill nearly as far as the present Main South Road as well as westwards as far as the eastern slopes of Marino. The place name was recorded in 1837 as "Weta wertinga", although its meaning, "in the midst of peppermint gums" was only recorded later. The name may have been a generic name applied to other places with peppermint gums; a similar name, Witawatang, was also applied to an area near Rapid Bay.

Seacliff Park Post Office opened on 15 January 1995, replacing the nearby South Brighton office.

In the 2016 Australian census, there were 2,439 people living in Seacliff Park.

== See also ==
- List of Adelaide suburbs
