= List of Adelaide suburbs =

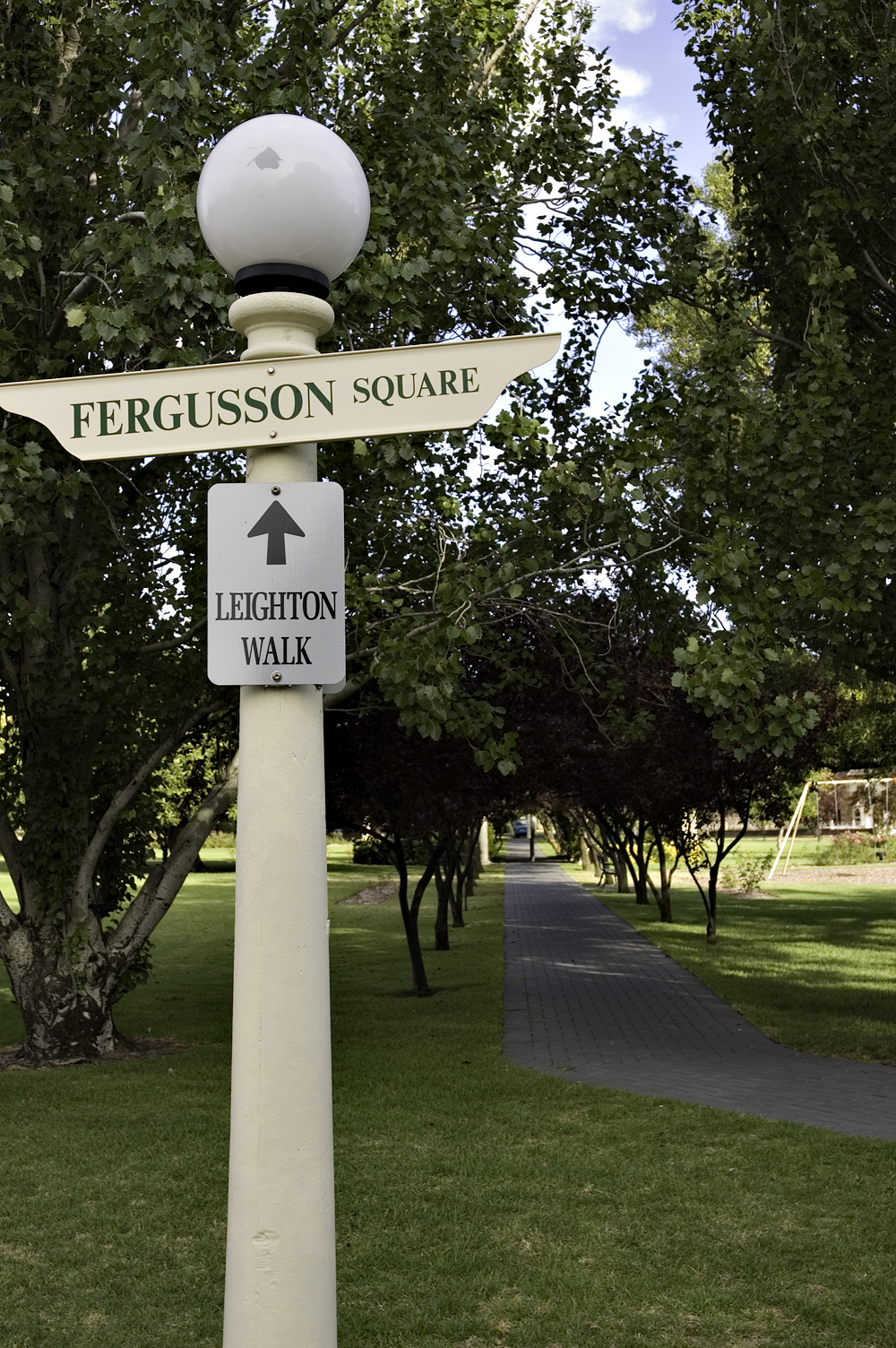
Fergusson Square in Toorak Gardens, a leafy inner eastern suburb.

This is a list of the suburbs of Adelaide, the capital city of South Australia, with their postcodes and local government areas (LGAs). This article does not include suburbs and localities within the Adelaide Hills region.

With over 430 suburbs in the Adelaide metropolitan area, the city's most expensive and prestigious properties are mainly located in the inner northern, eastern and southern suburbs. This is largely because of their proximity to the city centre and nearby private schools, as well as the array of historic homes within them.

| Suburb | Post Code | LGA | Year Estab. | Dist. (km) | Area (ha) | Population |
|---|---|---|---|---|---|---|
| Adelaide | 5000 | City of Adelaide | 1837 | – | 1,005 | 15,115 |
| North Adelaide | 5006 | City of Adelaide | 1837 | 0.5 | 420 | 6,950 |
| Auldana | 5072 | City of Burnside | 1847 | 9 | 312 | 625 |
| Beaumont | 5066 | City of Burnside | 1870 | 5.9 | 158 | 2,557 |
| Beulah Park | 5067 | City of Burnside | 1941 | 5 | 60 | 1,602 |
| Burnside | 5066 | City of Burnside | 1839 | 5.75 | 300 | 2,930 |
| Dulwich | 5065 | City of Burnside | 1854 | 2.4 | 112 | 1,678 |
| Eastwood | 5063 | City of Burnside | 1875 | 3 | 148 | 764 |
| Erindale | 5066 | City of Burnside | 1912 | 6 | 118 | 1,186 |
| Frewville | 5063 | City of Burnside | 1854 | 3 | 116 | 874 |
| Glen Osmond | 5064 | City of Burnside | 1841 | 5.5 | 607 | 1,990 |
| Glenside | 5065 | City of Burnside | 1860 | 2 | 140 | 2,422 |
| Glenunga | 5064 | City of Burnside | 1860 | 3 | 116 | 2,004 |
| Hazelwood Park | 5066 | City of Burnside | 1848 | 5.25 | 159 | 1,874 |
| Kensington Gardens | 5068 | City of Burnside | 1849 | 6 | 111 | 2,456 |
| Kensington Park | 5068 | City of Burnside | | 5.1 | 166 | 2,498 |
| Leabrook | 5068 | City of Burnside | 1870-1881 | 4.5 | 118 | 1,429 |
| Leawood Gardens | 5150 | City of Burnside | | 8 | 607 | 2,375 |
| Linden Park | 5065 | City of Burnside | 1867 | 4.8 | 153 | 1,910 |
| Magill | 5072 | City of Burnside | 1838 | 7.15 | 188 | 8,229 |
| Mount Osmond | 5064 | City of Burnside | 1900 | 6.75 | 607 | 2,375 |
| Rose Park | 5067 | City of Burnside | 1878 | 2.5 | 112 | 1,293 |
| Rosslyn Park | 5072 | City of Burnside | 1844 | 7 | 188 | 1,460 |
| Skye | 5072 | City of Burnside | | 8.5 | 312 | 278 |
| St Georges | 5064 | City of Burnside | | 5.2 | 153 | 1,253 |
| Stonyfell | 5066 | City of Burnside | 1926 | 7 | 300 | 1,326 |
| Toorak Gardens | 5065 | City of Burnside | 1917 | 3.35 | 111 | 2,521 |
| Tusmore | 5065 | City of Burnside | 1839 | 4.5 | 159 | 1,570 |
| Waterfall Gully | 5066 | City of Burnside | 1867 | 7.68 | 607 | 2,522 |
| Wattle Park | 5066 | City of Burnside | 31 March 1917 | 7 | 3.12 | 1,830 |
| Athelstone | 5076 | City of Campbelltown | 1852 | 10 | | 9,289 |
| Campbelltown | 5074 | City of Campbelltown | 1851 | 8.7 | | 7,003 |
| Hectorville | 5073 | City of Campbelltown | 1855 | | | 3,477 |
| Magill | 5072 | City of Campbelltown | 1838 | 7 | | 8,229 |
| Newton | 5074 | City of Campbelltown | 1854 | 10 | | 4,451 |
| Paradise | 5075 | City of Campbelltown | 1850 | | | 6,557 |
| Rostrevor | 5073 | City of Campbelltown | 1923 | 11 | | 7,366 |
| Tranmere | 5073 | City of Campbelltown | 1838 | | | 5,073 |
| Albert Park | 5014 | City of Charles Sturt | 1877 | 8.9 | | 1,724 |
| Allenby Gardens | 5009 | City of Charles Sturt | 1922 | 4.7 | | 1,868 |
| Athol Park | 5012 | City of Charles Sturt | | 9.2 | | 2,084 |
| Beverley | 5009 | City of Charles Sturt | 1849 | 6.1 | | 1,498 |
| Bowden | 5007 | City of Charles Sturt | 1839 | 3.1 | | 911 |
| Brompton | 5007 | City of Charles Sturt | 1849 | 3.8 | | 3,537 |
| Cheltenham | 5014 | City of Charles Sturt | 1849 | 9.2 | | 2,175 |
| Croydon | 5008 | City of Charles Sturt | 1855 | 4.5 | | 1,238 |
| Devon Park | 5008 | City of Charles Sturt | 1920 | 4.6 | | 888 |
| Findon | 5023 | City of Charles Sturt | 1848 | 6.5 | | 6,205 |
| Flinders Park | 5025 | City of Charles Sturt | -- | 5.3 | | 4,880 |
| Fulham Gardens | 5024 | City of Charles Sturt | -- | 8 | | 5,942 |
| Grange | 5022 | City of Charles Sturt | 1878 | 11 | 230 | 5,916 |
| Hendon | 5014 | City of Charles Sturt | 1921 | | | 1,173 |
| Henley Beach | 5022 | City of Charles Sturt | c. 1860 | 9.7 | 250 | 5,562 |
| Henley Beach South | 5022 | City of Charles Sturt | c. 1860 | 9 | | 2,289 |
| Hindmarsh | 5007 | City of Charles Sturt | 1838 | | | 231 |
| Kidman Park | 5025 | City of Charles Sturt | 1954 | 6.7 | | 3,317 |
| Kilkenny | 5009 | City of Charles Sturt | 1849 | | | 1,660 |
| Ovingham | 5082 | City of Charles Sturt | | | | 683 |
| Pennington | 5013 | City of Charles Sturt | 1909 | | | 3,647 |
| Renown Park | 5008 | City of Charles Sturt | 1920 | | | 1,697 |
| Ridleyton | 5008 | City of Charles Sturt | 1873 | | | 1,128 |
| Rosewater | 5013 | City of Charles Sturt | 1855 | | | 3,278 |
| Royal Park | 5014 | City of Charles Sturt | 1880 | | | 2,967 |
| Seaton | 5023 | City of Charles Sturt | 1940s | | | 10,365 |
| Semaphore Park | 5019 | City of Charles Sturt | 1976 | | | 4,298 |
| St Clair | 5011 | City of Charles Sturt | 2012 | | | 1,712 |
| Tennyson | 5022 | City of Charles Sturt | | | | 1,166 |
| Welland | 5007 | City of Charles Sturt | 1907 | | | 866 |
| West Beach | 5024 | City of Charles Sturt | 1929 | | | 4,964 |
| West Croydon | 5008 | City of Charles Sturt | 1855 | | | 4,141 |
| West Hindmarsh | 5007 | City of Charles Sturt | | | | 1,535 |
| West Lakes | 5021 | City of Charles Sturt | 1977 | | | 5,787 |
| West Lakes Shore | 5020 | City of Charles Sturt | 1970s | | | 3,112 |
| Woodville | 5011 | City of Charles Sturt | 1853 | | | 1,999 |
| Woodville North | 5012 | City of Charles Sturt | | | | 2,450 |
| Woodville Park | 5011 | City of Charles Sturt | | | | 1,735 |
| Woodville South | 5011 | City of Charles Sturt | | | | 3,179 |
| Woodville West | 5011 | City of Charles Sturt | | | | 3,093 |
| Bibaringa | 5118 | Town of Gawler | | | | |
| Evanston | 5116 | Town of Gawler | 1850 | | | |
| Evanston Gardens | 5116 | Town of Gawler | | | | |
| Evanston Park | 5116 | Town of Gawler | | | | |
| Evanston South | 5116 | Town of Gawler | | | | |
| Gawler | 5118 | Town of Gawler | 1836 | | | |
| Gawler East | 5118 | Town of Gawler | 1836 | | | |
| Gawler South | 5118 | Town of Gawler | 1836 | | | |
| Gawler West | 5118 | Town of Gawler | 1950s | | | |
| Hillier | 5116 | Town of Gawler | | | | |
| Kudla | 5115 | Town of Gawler | | | | |
| Willaston | 5118 | Town of Gawler | | | | |
| Brighton | 5048 | City of Holdfast Bay | 1858 | | | |
| Glenelg | 5045 | City of Holdfast Bay | 1836 | | | |
| Glenelg East | 5045 | City of Holdfast Bay | 1860s | | | |
| Glenelg North | 5045 | City of Holdfast Bay | | | | |
| Glenelg South | 5045 | City of Holdfast Bay | | | | |
| Hove | 5048 | City of Holdfast Bay | 1869 | | | |
| Kingston Park | 5049 | City of Holdfast Bay | | | | |
| North Brighton | 5048 | City of Holdfast Bay | | | | |
| Seacliff | 5049 | City of Holdfast Bay | 1850 | | | |
| Seacliff Park | 5049 | City of Holdfast Bay | | | | |
| Somerton Park | 5044 | City of Holdfast Bay | | | | |
| South Brighton | 5048 | City of Holdfast Bay | | | | |
| Ascot Park | 5043 | City of Marion | | | | |
| Clovelly Park | 5042 | City of Marion | 1950s | | | |
| Darlington | 5047 | City of Marion | 1851 | | | |
| Dover Gardens | 5048 | City of Marion | 1950s | | | |
| Edwardstown | 5039 | City of Marion | 1838 | | | |
| Glandore | 5037 | City of Marion | | | | |
| Glengowrie | 5044 | City of Marion | | | | |
| Hallett Cove | 5158 | City of Marion | 1965 | | | |
| Marino | 5049 | City of Marion | | | | |
| Marion | 5043 | City of Marion | 1838 | | | |
| Mitchell Park | 5043 | City of Marion | | | | |
| Morphettville | 5043 | City of Marion | | | | |
| O'Halloran Hill | 5158 | City of Marion | 1838 | | | |
| Oaklands Park | 5046 | City of Marion | 1906 | | | |
| Park Holme | 5043 | City of Marion | | | | |
| Plympton Park | 5038 | City of Marion | 1880s | | | |
| Seacliff Park | 5049 | City of Marion | | | | |
| Seacombe Gardens | 5047 | City of Marion | | | | |
| Seacombe Heights | 5047 | City of Marion | | | | |
| Seaview Downs | 5049 | City of Marion | | | | |
| Sheidow Park | 5158 | City of Marion | late 1970s | | | |
| South Plympton | 5038 | City of Marion | | | | |
| Sturt | 5047 | City of Marion | | | | |
| Tonsley | 5042 | City of Marion | | | | |
| Trott Park | 5158 | City of Marion | | | | |
| Warradale | 5046 | City of Marion | | | | |
| Bedford Park | 5042 | City of Mitcham | 1917 | | | |
| Belair | 5052 | City of Mitcham | | | | |
| Bellevue Heights | 5050 | City of Mitcham | | | | |
| Blackwood | 5051 | City of Mitcham | 1840 | | | |
| Brown Hill Creek | 5062 | City of Mitcham | | | | |
| Clapham | 5062 | City of Mitcham | 1856 | | | |
| Clarence Gardens | 5039 | City of Mitcham | | | | |
| Col. Light Gardens | 5041 | City of Mitcham | 1915 | | | |
| Coromandel Valley | 5051 | City of Mitcham | 1837 | | | |
| Crafers West | 5152 | City of Mitcham | | | | |
| Craigburn Farm | 5051 | City of Mitcham | | | | |
| Cumberland Park | 5041 | City of Mitcham | | | | |
| Daw Park | 5041 | City of Mitcham | | | | |
| Eden Hills | 5050 | City of Mitcham | 1883 | | | |
| Glenalta | 5052 | City of Mitcham | | | | |
| Hawthorn | 5062 | City of Mitcham | 1880s | | | |
| Hawthorndene | 5051 | City of Mitcham | | | | |
| Kingswood | 5062 | City of Mitcham | 1877 | | | |
| Leawood Gardens | 5150 | City of Mitcham | | | | |
| Lower Mitcham | 5062 | City of Mitcham | 1920s | | | |
| Lynton | 5062 | City of Mitcham | | | | |
| Melrose Park | 5039 | City of Mitcham | 1989 | | | |
| Mitcham | 5062 | City of Mitcham | 1853 | | | |
| Netherby | 5062 | City of Mitcham | 1838 | | | |
| Panorama | 5041 | City of Mitcham | 1838 | | | |
| Pasadena | 5042 | City of Mitcham | | | | |
| Springfield | 5062 | City of Mitcham | 1841 | | | |
| St Marys | 5042 | City of Mitcham | 1850s | | | |
| Stirling | 5152 | City of Mitcham | | | | |
| Torrens Park | 5062 | City of Mitcham | 1945 | | | |
| Upper Sturt | 5156 | City of Mitcham | 1844 | | | |
| Urrbrae | 5064 | City of Mitcham | 1850s | | | |
| Westbourne Park | 5041 | City of Mitcham | 1881 | | | |
| College Park | 5069 | City of Norwood Payneham St Peters | | | | 764 |
| Evandale | 5069 | City of Norwood Payneham St Peters | | | | 1,370 |
| Felixstow | 5070 | City of Norwood Payneham St Peters | | | | 2,311 |
| Firle | 5070 | City of Norwood Payneham St Peters | 1881 | | | 1,437 |
| Glynde | 5070 | City of Norwood Payneham St Peters | 1856 | | | 1,931 |
| Hackney | 5069 | City of Norwood Payneham St Peters | | | | 567 |
| Heathpool | 5068 | City of Norwood Payneham St Peters | | | | 544 |
| Joslin | 5070 | City of Norwood Payneham St Peters | | | | 1,151 |
| Kensington | 5068 | City of Norwood Payneham St Peters | 1847 | | | 1,769 |
| Kent Town | 5067 | City of Norwood Payneham St Peters | 1840 | | | 1,210 |
| Marden | 5070 | City of Norwood Payneham St Peters | | | | 2,309 |
| Marryatville | 5068 | City of Norwood Payneham St Peters | 1848 | | | 588 |
| Maylands | 5069 | City of Norwood Payneham St Peters | 1876 | | | 1,494 |
| Norwood | 5067 | City of Norwood Payneham St Peters | 1847 | | | 5,953 |
| Payneham | 5070 | City of Norwood Payneham St Peters | 1839 | | | 2,293 |
| Payneham South | 5070 | City of Norwood Payneham St Peters | | | | 1,640 |
| Royston Park | 5070 | City of Norwood Payneham St Peters | | | | 1,203 |
| St Morris | 5068 | City of Norwood Payneham St Peters | | | | 1,497 |
| St Peters | 5069 | City of Norwood Payneham St Peters | 1838 | | | 3,219 |
| Stepney | 5069 | City of Norwood Payneham St Peters | 1850 | | | 872 |
| Trinity Gardens | 5068 | City of Norwood Payneham St Peters | 1840 | | | 1,234 |
| Aberfoyle Park | 5159 | City of Onkaparinga | 1980 | | | |
| Aldinga | 5173 | City of Onkaparinga | | | | |
| Aldinga Beach | 5173 | City of Onkaparinga | 1857 | | | |
| Blewitt Springs | 5171 | City of Onkaparinga | | | | |
| Chandlers Hill | 5159 | City of Onkaparinga | | | | |
| Cherry Gardens | 5157 | City of Onkaparinga | | | | |
| Christie Downs | 5164 | City of Onkaparinga | 1950s | | | |
| Christies Beach | 5165 | City of Onkaparinga | 1925 | | | |
| Clarendon | 5157 | City of Onkaparinga | | | | |
| Coromandel East | 5157 | City of Onkaparinga | | | | |
| Coromandel Valley | 5051 | City of Onkaparinga | | | | |
| Darlington | 5047 | City of Onkaparinga | | | | |
| Dorset Vale | 5157 | City of Onkaparinga | | | | |
| Flagstaff Hill | 5159 | City of Onkaparinga | 1967 | | | |
| Hackham | 5163 | City of Onkaparinga | | | | |
| Hackham West | 5163 | City of Onkaparinga | | | | |
| Happy Valley | 5159 | City of Onkaparinga | 1866 | | | |
| Huntfield Heights | 5163 | City of Onkaparinga | | | | |
| Ironbank | 5153 | City of Onkaparinga | | | | |
| Kangarilla | 5157 | City of Onkaparinga | | | | |
| Lonsdale | 5160 | City of Onkaparinga | 1840s | | | |
| Maslin Beach | 5170 | City of Onkaparinga | 1975 | | | |
| McLaren Flat | 5171 | City of Onkaparinga | | | | |
| McLaren Vale | 5171 | City of Onkaparinga | | | | |
| Moana | 5169 | City of Onkaparinga | 1927 | | | |
| Morphett Vale | 5162 | City of Onkaparinga | 1840 | | | |
| Noarlunga Centre | 5168 | City of Onkaparinga | 1978 | | | |
| Noarlunga Downs | 5168 | City of Onkaparinga | 1978 | | | |
| O'Halloran Hill | 5158 | City of Onkaparinga | | | | |
| O'Sullivan Beach | 5166 | City of Onkaparinga | 1926 | | | |
| Old Noarlunga | 5168 | City of Onkaparinga | | | | |
| Old Reynella | 5161 | City of Onkaparinga | 1840 | | | |
| Onkaparinga Hills | 5163 | City of Onkaparinga | | | | |
| Port Noarlunga | 5167 | City of Onkaparinga | 1856 | | | |
| Port Noarlunga South | 5167 | City of Onkaparinga | 1923 | | | |
| Port Willunga | 5173 | City of Onkaparinga | 1840 | | | |
| Reynella | 5161 | City of Onkaparinga | 1840 | | | |
| Reynella East | 5161 | City of Onkaparinga | 1840 | | | |
| Seaford | 5169 | City of Onkaparinga | 1960 | | | |
| Seaford Heights | 5169 | City of Onkaparinga | | | | |
| Seaford Meadows | 5169 | City of Onkaparinga | 1995 | | | |
| Seaford Rise | 5169 | City of Onkaparinga | | | | |
| Sellicks Beach | 5174 | City of Onkaparinga | | | | |
| Sellicks Hill | 5174 | City of Onkaparinga | | | | |
| Tatachilla | 5171 | City of Onkaparinga | | | | |
| The Range | 5172 | City of Onkaparinga | | | | |
| Whites Valley | 5172 | City of Onkaparinga | | | | |
| Willunga | 5172 | City of Onkaparinga | | | | |
| Willunga South | 5172 | City of Onkaparinga | | | | |
| Woodcroft | 5162 | City of Onkaparinga | 1969 | | | |
| Andrews Farm | 5114 | City of Playford | 1991 | | | |
| Angle Vale | 5117 | City of Playford | 1852 | | | |
| Bibaringa | 5118 | City of Playford | | | | |
| Blakeview | 5114 | City of Playford | 1990 | | | |
| Buckland Park | 5120 | City of Playford | | | | |
| Craigmore | 5114 | City of Playford | Late 1960s | | | |
| Davoren Park | 5113 | City of Playford | 1993 | | | |
| Edinburgh North | 5113 | City of Playford | 2011 | | | |
| Elizabeth | 5112 | City of Playford | 1955 | | | |
| Elizabeth Downs | 5113 | City of Playford | | | | |
| Elizabeth East | 5112 | City of Playford | | | | |
| Elizabeth Grove | 5112 | City of Playford | 1955 | | | |
| Elizabeth North | 5113 | City of Playford | Late 1950s | | | |
| Elizabeth Park | 5113 | City of Playford | | | | |
| Elizabeth South | 5112 | City of Playford | Late 1950s | | | |
| Elizabeth Vale | 5112 | City of Playford | 1955 | | | |
| Evanston Park | 5116 | City of Playford | | | | |
| Eyre | 5121 | City of Playford | | | | |
| Gould Creek | 5114 | City of Playford | | | | |
| Hillbank | 5112 | City of Playford | | | | |
| Hillier | 5116 | City of Playford | | | | |
| Humbug Scrub | 5114 | City of Playford | | | | |
| MacDonald Park | 5121 | City of Playford | | | | |
| Munno Para | 5115 | City of Playford | | | | |
| Munno Para West | 5115 | City of Playford | 1854 | | | |
| Munno Para Downs | 5115 | City of Playford | | | | |
| One Tree Hill | 5114 | City of Playford | | | | |
| Penfield | 5121 | City of Playford | | | | |
| Penfield Gardens | 5121 | City of Playford | | | | |
| Riverlea Park | 5114 | City of Playford | | | | |
| Sampson Flat | 5114 | City of Playford | | | | |
| Smithfield | 5114 | City of Playford | 1850 | | | |
| Smithfield Plains | 5114 | City of Playford | | | | |
| Uleybury | 5114 | City of Playford | | | | |
| Virginia | 5120 | City of Playford | | | | |
| Waterloo Corner | 5110 | City of Playford | | | | |
| Yattalunga | 5114 | City of Playford | | | | |
| Alberton | 5014 | City of Port Adelaide Enfield | 1839 | | | |
| Angle Park | 5010 | City of Port Adelaide Enfield | 1950s | | | |
| Birkenhead | 5015 | City of Port Adelaide Enfield | 1877 | | | |
| Blair Athol | 5084 | City of Port Adelaide Enfield | 1944 | | | |
| Broadview | 5083 | City of Port Adelaide Enfield | 1915 | | | |
| Clearview | 5085 | City of Port Adelaide Enfield | 1922 | | | |
| Croydon Park | 5008 | City of Port Adelaide Enfield | 1930s | | | |
| Dernancourt | 5075 | City of Port Adelaide Enfield | 1923 | | | |
| Devon Park | 5008 | City of Port Adelaide Enfield | 1920 | | | |
| Dry Creek | 5094 | City of Port Adelaide Enfield | | | | |
| Dudley Park | 5008 | City of Port Adelaide Enfield | | | | |
| Enfield | 5085 | City of Port Adelaide Enfield | 1868 | | | |
| Ethelton | 5015 | City of Port Adelaide Enfield | | | | |
| Exeter | 5019 | City of Port Adelaide Enfield | 1882 | | | |
| Ferryden Park | 5010 | City of Port Adelaide Enfield | 1924 | | | |
| Gepps Cross | 5094 | City of Port Adelaide Enfield | 1988 | | | |
| Gilles Plains | 5086 | City of Port Adelaide Enfield | 1950s | | | |
| Gillman | 5013 | City of Port Adelaide Enfield | | | | |
| Glanville | 5015 | City of Port Adelaide Enfield | 1951 | | | |
| Greenacres | 5086 | City of Port Adelaide Enfield | | | | |
| Hampstead Gardens | 5086 | City of Port Adelaide Enfield | | | | |
| Hillcrest | 5086 | City of Port Adelaide Enfield | | | | |
| Holden Hill | 5088 | City of Port Adelaide Enfield | | | | |
| Kilburn | 5084 | City of Port Adelaide Enfield | | | | |
| Klemzig | 5087 | City of Port Adelaide Enfield | 1837 | | | 6,100 |
| Largs Bay | 5016 | City of Port Adelaide Enfield | | | | |
| Largs North | 5016 | City of Port Adelaide Enfield | 1945 | | | |
| Lightsview | 5085 | City of Port Adelaide Enfield | 2016 | | | |
| Manningham | 5086 | City of Port Adelaide Enfield | | | | |
| Mansfield Park | 5012 | City of Port Adelaide Enfield | 1950s | | | |
| Northfield | 5085 | City of Port Adelaide Enfield | | | | |
| Northgate | 5085 | City of Port Adelaide Enfield | 2000 | | | |
| North Haven | 5018 | City of Port Adelaide Enfield | 1975 | | | |
| Oakden | 5086 | City of Port Adelaide Enfield | 1993 | | | |
| Osborne | 5017 | City of Port Adelaide Enfield | 1951 | | | |
| Ottoway | 5013 | City of Port Adelaide Enfield | 1883 | | | |
| Outer Harbor | 5018 | City of Port Adelaide Enfield | 1908 | | | |
| Peterhead | 5016 | City of Port Adelaide Enfield | 1875 | | | |
| Port Adelaide | 5015 | City of Port Adelaide Enfield | 1836 | | | 1,293 |
| Queenstown | 5014 | City of Port Adelaide Enfield | 1864 | | | |
| Regency Park | 5010 | City of Port Adelaide Enfield | | | | |
| Rosewater | 5013 | City of Port Adelaide Enfield | | | | |
| Sefton Park | 5083 | City of Port Adelaide Enfield | | | | |
| Semaphore | 5019 | City of Port Adelaide Enfield | 1849 | | | |
| Semaphore South | 5019 | City of Port Adelaide Enfield | 1945 | | | |
| Taperoo | 5017 | City of Port Adelaide Enfield | 1945 | | | |
| Valley View | 5093 | City of Port Adelaide Enfield | | | | |
| Walkley Heights | 5098 | City of Port Adelaide Enfield | 1995 | | | |
| Windsor Gardens | 5087 | City of Port Adelaide Enfield | | | | |
| Wingfield | 5013 | City of Port Adelaide Enfield | | | | |
| Woodville Gardens | 5012 | City of Port Adelaide Enfield | 1947 | 9 | | 2,383 |
| Broadview | 5083 | City of Prospect | | | | 4,129 |
| Collinswood | 5081 | City of Prospect | | | | 1,384 |
| Fitzroy | 5082 | City of Prospect | | | | 781 |
| Medindie Gardens | 5081 | City of Prospect | | | | 340 |
| Nailsworth | 5083 | City of Prospect | 1853 | | | 2,149 |
| Prospect | 5082 | City of Prospect | 1872 | | | 13,280 |
| Ovingham | 5082 | City of Prospect | 1875 | | | 683 |
| Sefton Park | 5083 | City of Prospect | | | | 1,210 |
| Thorngate | 5082 | City of Prospect | | | | 186 |
| Bolivar | 5110 | City of Salisbury | | | | |
| Brahma Lodge | 5109 | City of Salisbury | 1960 | | | |
| Burton | 5110 | City of Salisbury | | | | |
| Cavan | 5094 | City of Salisbury | 1849 | | | |
| Dry Creek | 5094 | City of Salisbury | | | | |
| Direk | 5110 | City of Salisbury | | | | |
| Edinburgh | 5111 | City of Salisbury | 1997 | | | |
| Elizabeth Vale | 5112 | City of Salisbury | 1955 | | | |
| Globe Derby Park | 5110 | City of Salisbury | 1998 | | | |
| Green Fields | 5107 | City of Salisbury | | | | |
| Gulfview Heights | 5096 | City of Salisbury | 1996 | | | |
| Ingle Farm | 5098 | City of Salisbury | 1959 | | | |
| Mawson Lakes | 5095 | City of Salisbury | 1990s | | | |
| Parafield | 5106 | City of Salisbury | | | | |
| Parafield Gardens | 5107 | City of Salisbury | 1970s | | | |
| Paralowie | 5108 | City of Salisbury | 1980s | | | |
| Para Hills | 5096 | City of Salisbury | 1959 | | | |
| Para Hills West | 5096 | City of Salisbury | | | | |
| Para Vista | 5093 | City of Salisbury | | | | |
| Pooraka | 5095 | City of Salisbury | | | | |
| Salisbury | 5108 | City of Salisbury | 1843 | | | 7,551 |
| Salisbury Downs | 5108 | City of Salisbury | | | | |
| Salisbury East | 5109 | City of Salisbury | | | | 8,850 |
| Salisbury Heights | 5109 | City of Salisbury | 1970s | | | 4,237 |
| Salisbury North | 5108 | City of Salisbury | 1950s | | | |
| Salisbury Park | 5109 | City of Salisbury | | | | |
| Salisbury Plain | 5109 | City of Salisbury | | | | |
| Salisbury South | 5106 | City of Salisbury | | | | |
| St Kilda | 5110 | City of Salisbury | | | | |
| Valley View | 5093 | City of Salisbury | | | | |
| Walkley Heights | 5098 | City of Salisbury | | | | |
| Waterloo Corner | 5110 | City of Salisbury | | | | |
| Banksia Park | 5091 | City of Tea Tree Gully | | | | |
| Dernancourt | 5075 | City of Tea Tree Gully | | | | |
| Fairview Park | 5126 | City of Tea Tree Gully | | | | |
| Gilles Plains | 5086 | City of Tea Tree Gully | | | | |
| Golden Grove | 5125 | City of Tea Tree Gully | 1985 | | | 9,664 |
| Gould Creek | 5114 | City of Tea Tree Gully | | | | |
| Greenwith | 5125 | City of Tea Tree Gully | 1985 | | | 9,075 |
| Gulfview Heights | 5096 | City of Tea Tree Gully | | | | |
| Highbury | 5089 | City of Tea Tree Gully | | | | |
| Holden Hill | 5088 | City of Tea Tree Gully | | | | |
| Hope Valley | 5090 | City of Tea Tree Gully | 1839 | | | |
| Houghton | 5131 | City of Tea Tree Gully | | | | |
| Modbury | 5092 | City of Tea Tree Gully | 1857 | | | 4,924 |
| Modbury Heights | 5092 | City of Tea Tree Gully | 1970s | | | |
| Modbury North | 5092 | City of Tea Tree Gully | | | | |
| Para Hills | 5096 | City of Tea Tree Gully | | | | |
| Redwood Park | 5097 | City of Tea Tree Gully | 1959 | | | |
| Ridgehaven | 5097 | City of Tea Tree Gully | 1950s | | | |
| St Agnes | 5097 | City of Tea Tree Gully | | | | |
| Salisbury Heights | 5109 | City of Tea Tree Gully | | | | 4,237 |
| Surrey Downs | 5126 | City of Tea Tree Gully | 1970s | | | |
| Tea Tree Gully | 5091 | City of Tea Tree Gully | | | | |
| Upper Hermitage | 5131 | City of Tea Tree Gully | | | | |
| Valley View | 5093 | City of Tea Tree Gully | | | | |
| Vista | 5091 | City of Tea Tree Gully | | | | |
| Wynn Vale | 5127 | City of Tea Tree Gully | 1985 | | | |
| Yatala Vale | 5126 | City of Tea Tree Gully | | | | |
| Black Forest | 5035 | City of Unley | 1850 | | | 1,933 |
| Clarence Park | 5034 | City of Unley | 1892 | | | 2,540 |
| Everard Park | 5035 | City of Unley | | | | 1,078 |
| Forestville | 5035 | City of Unley | | | | 1,389 |
| Fullarton | 5063 | City of Unley | 1849 | | | 4,241 |
| Goodwood | 5034 | City of Unley | 1849 | | | 2,986 |
| Highgate | 5063 | City of Unley | 1881 | | | 1,645 |
| Hyde Park | 5061 | City of Unley | | | | 1,665 |
| Kings Park | 5034 | City of Unley | 1905 | | | 545 |
| Malvern | 5061 | City of Unley | | | | 2,574 |
| Millswood | 5034 | City of Unley | | | | 2,140 |
| Myrtle Bank | 5064 | City of Unley | | | | 2,883 |
| Parkside | 5063 | City of Unley | 1849 | | | 4,791 |
| Unley | 5061 | City of Unley | 1840 | | | 4,006 |
| Unley Park | 5061 | City of Unley | 1840 | | | 1,445 |
| Wayville | 5034 | City of Unley | 1899 | | | 1,835 |
| Adelaide Airport | 5950 | City of West Torrens | | | | 0 |
| Ashford | 5035 | City of West Torrens | | | | 959 |
| Brooklyn Park | 5032 | City of West Torrens | | | | 4,781 |
| Camden Park | 5038 | City of West Torrens | | | | 3,141 |
| Cowandilla | 5033 | City of West Torrens | 1840 | | | 1,433 |
| Fulham | 5024 | City of West Torrens | 1836 | | | 2,702 |
| Glandore | 5037 | City of West Torrens | | | | 2,972 |
| Glenelg North | 5045 | City of West Torrens | | | | 6,254 |
| Hilton | 5033 | City of West Torrens | 1849 | | | 839 |
| Keswick | 5035 | City of West Torrens | | | | 742 |
| Keswick Terminal | 5035 | City of West Torrens | | | | 0 |
| Kurralta Park | 5037 | City of West Torrens | 1837 | | | 2,823 |
| Lockleys | 5032 | City of West Torrens | | | | 5,628 |
| Marleston | 5033 | City of West Torrens | 1837 | | | 1,836 |
| Mile End | 5031 | City of West Torrens | 1860 | | | 4,431 |
| Mile End South | 5031 | City of West Torrens | | | | 24 |
| Netley | 5037 | City of West Torrens | | | | 1,776 |
| North Plympton | 5037 | City of West Torrens | | | | 3,225 |
| Novar Gardens | 5040 | City of West Torrens | | | | 2,504 |
| Plympton | 5038 | City of West Torrens | | | | 4,756 |
| Richmond | 5033 | City of West Torrens | 1890s | | | 3,303 |
| Southwark | 5031 | City of West Torrens | 2025 | | | c. 20 (2026) |
| Thebarton | 5031 | City of West Torrens | 1839 | | | 1,431 |
| Torrensville | 5031 | City of West Torrens | | | | 4,043 |
| Underdale | 5032 | City of West Torrens | | | | 2,299 |
| West Beach | 5024 | City of West Torrens | | | | 4,964 |
| West Richmond | 5033 | City of West Torrens | | | | 968 |
| Gilberton | 5081 | Corporation of the Town of Walkerville | | | | 1,441 |
| Medindie | 5081 | Corporation of the Town of Walkerville | | | | 1,182 |
| Vale Park | 5081 | Corporation of the Town of Walkerville | 1961 | | | 2,245 |
| Walkerville | 5081 | Corporation of the Town of Walkerville | 1838 | 4 | | 2,370 |

== See also ==
- Local government areas of South Australia
- List of Adelaide railway stations
- List of Adelaide obsolete suburb names
- List of historic houses in South Australia
- List of Adelaide parks and gardens
