= Brighton, South Australia =

Brighton
- Suburb
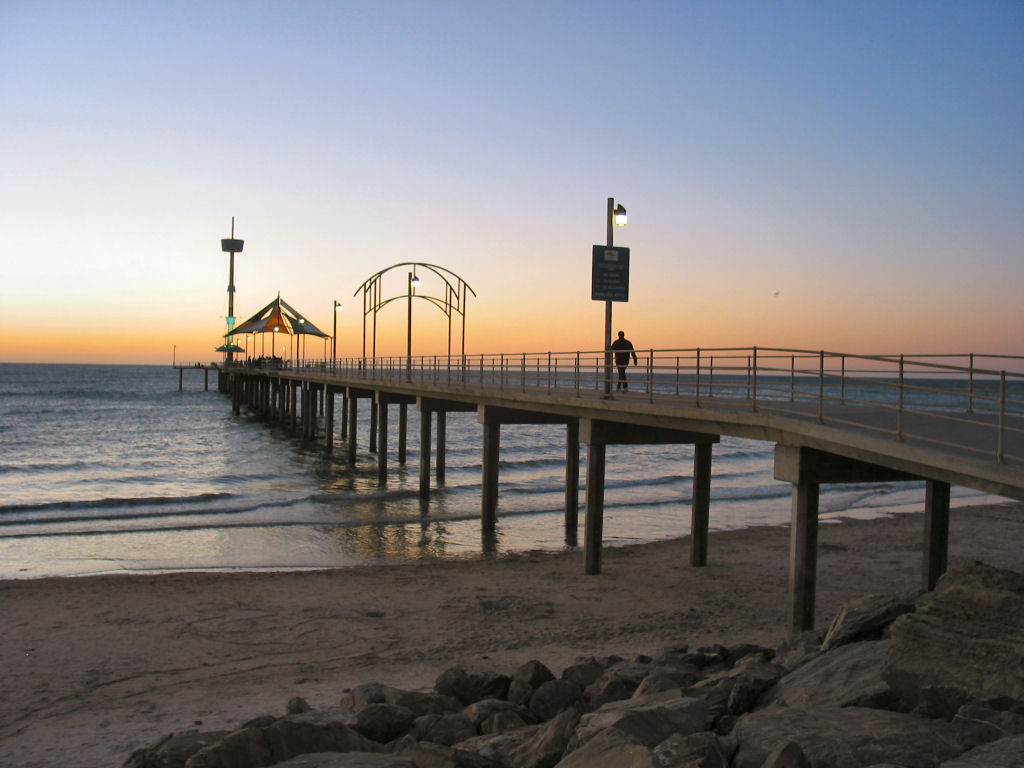
- Brighton Jetty

- Country: Australia
- State: South Australia
- City: Adelaide
- LGA: City of Holdfast Bay

Government
  - State electorate: Gibson
  - Federal division: Boothby

Population
  - Total: 3,834 (SAL 2021)
- Postcode: 5048
Suburbs around Brighton
Gulf St Vincent	Hove	Warradale
Gulf St Vincent	Brighton	Warradale; Dover Gardens
Gulf St Vincent	South Brighton	Dover Gardens

Brighton is a coastal suburb of Adelaide, South Australia, situated between Seacliff and Glenelg and aside Holdfast Bay. Some notable features of the area are the Brighton-Seacliff Yacht Club, the Brighton Surf Lifesaving Club, the Brighton Jetty, and a beach. The Windsor Theatre, constructed in 1925, is a long-standing institution.

== History ==
The Kaurna people inhabited the area before British colonisation of South Australia. Witu-wattingga has become the accepted Kaurna name for the area, although its origin is probably arose through confusion with Wita-wattingga, the certified Kaurna name for an area around present-day Seacliff Park, meaning "in the midst of peppermint gums". (There is, however, a Kaurna language meaning for witu-watti, meaning "reeds in the middle", so could be applied to some small, intermittent swamps with reeds in the area, such as one near Young Street in Seacliff.)

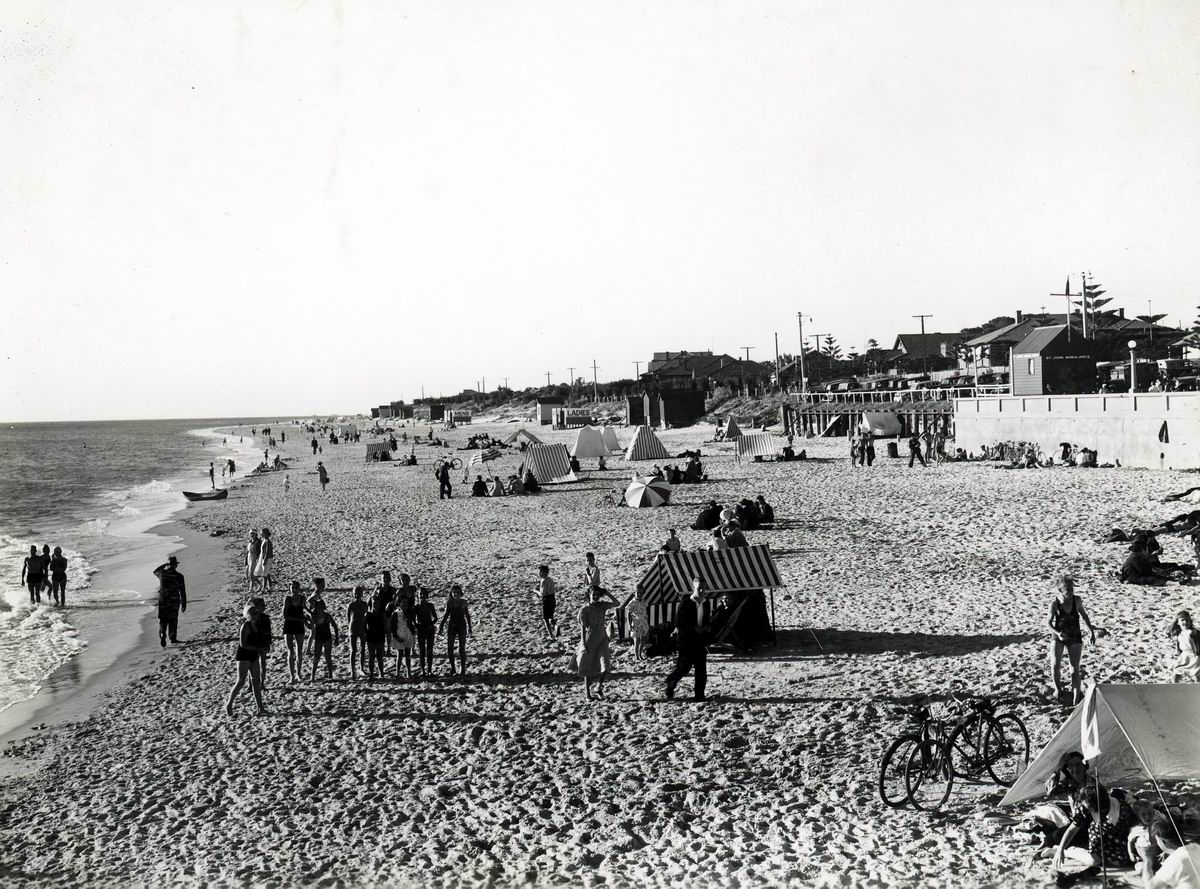
Brighton beach in 1930

Brighton Post Office opened on 27 August 1849. Brighton Jetty Post Office opened on 1 March 1950 and closed in 1979.

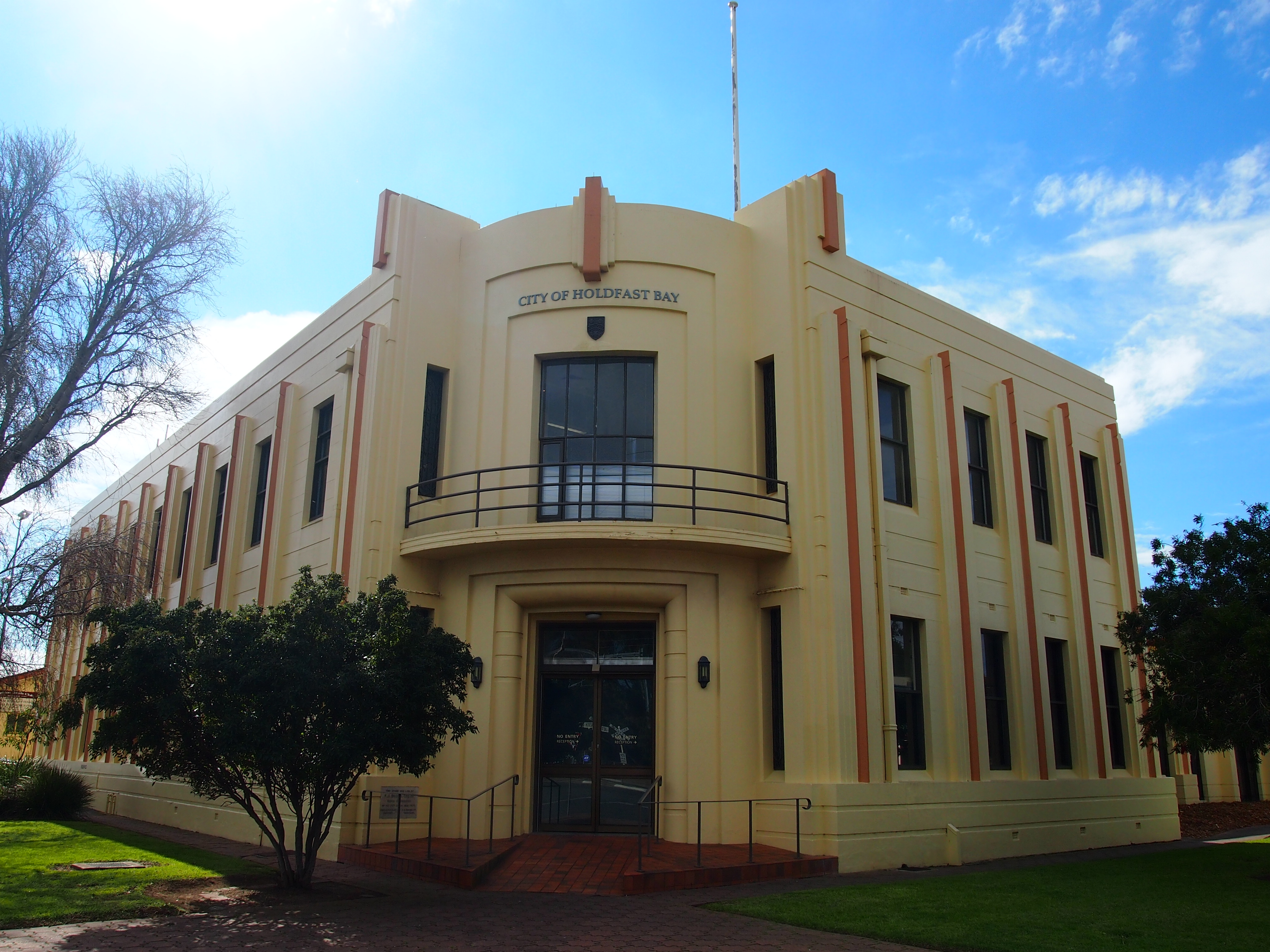
Brighton municipal building (built 1937 as the town hall)

Brighton became the seat of a newly-formed municipality, the Corporate Town of Brighton, in 1858.

The first Brighton Town Hall was built in 1869 and was just the fourth town hall built in the colony of South Australia. The architect and builder was George William Highet, who arrived in the colony in 1836 and served as a town clerk and inaugural councillor. He died in Brighton aged 80 years. The hall was constructed of stone from Ayliffe's quarry in the Adelaide Hills laid on concrete foundations. It was used as the civic centre of the City of Brighton from 1869 until 1936 when it was then leased by the RSL. The second town hall was opened in 1937, at 24 Jetty Road, and still fulfils a civic administration purpose, as one of two City of Holdfast Bay municipal offices.

Australian geologist, Antarctic explorer, and academic Sir Douglas Mawson and his family, including his wife, community worker and writer Lady Paquita Mawson, and daughters Patricia (later a noted parasitologist) and Jessica, moved into their new home, "Jerbii" at 44 King Street, Brighton, in 1920. They had previously rented a home on the South Esplanade while it was being built, after returning from England after World War I. The Mawsons lived in Brighton until at least 1958, when Douglas died. Paquita Mawson was "a leading community figure" in Brighton, whose parents, Dutch-born metallurgist and businessman Guillaume Daniel Delprat and his wife Henrietta Marie Wilhelmine Sophia Delprat, also lived in the suburb.

Paquita Mawson, among her many other activities, was instrumental in establishing Hopetoun School, which operated out of the parish hall at St Jude's Anglican Church. The Misses Fleming of Edwardstown opened Hopetoun School in 1922, and Patricia Mawson attended the school for her early education. The school moved to St Mary's Church Hall in Mitcham in 1962, operating there until 1965. It may have been the longest-operating totally independent school in South Australia.

=== Graves ===
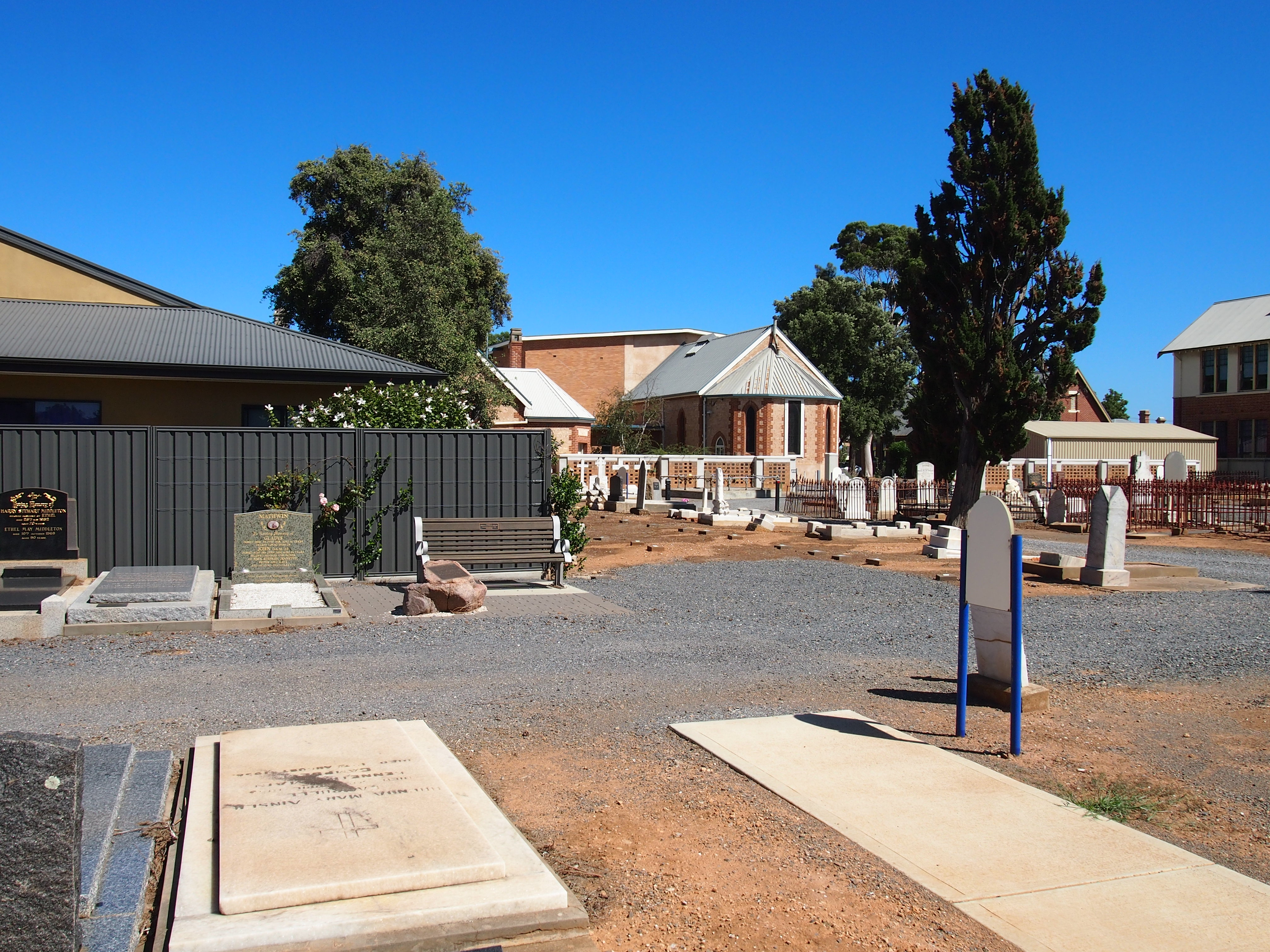
Sir Douglas Mawson's grave at St Jude's Church

Social reformer Catherine Helen Spence, her brother J. B. Spence, Pat Glennon, and photojournalist Paul Moran are buried at North Brighton Cemetery, at 301 Brighton Road.

Douglas Mawson, who died in 1958, was buried at St Jude's Church cemetery. After Paquita Mawson died in 1974, she was buried alongside her husband.

== Overview ==
Brighton has a large sandy beach which is patrolled by the Brighton Surf Lifesaving Club on Weekends and Public Holidays between November and March. Brighton Beach is popular for Adelaide beach goers as it is relatively safe – currently rated as Least Hazardous by Surf Lifesaving.

Surfers near Brighton jetty on a stormy day

A sand replenishment program has been in operation for many years resulting in the beach sand dunes gradually increasing through the program of replacing eroded sand and replanting of the dunes with plants and grasses.

In summer, a sandbar normally forms in the water which can produce waves on windy days. Brighton is well known by local surfers for producing messy but fun "stormy sessions".

The Esplanade is an area of prime real estate which has been transformed over the years from a street of old cottages to new modern town houses.

Brighton's Jetty Road runs perpendicular to the Esplanade and is home to many restaurants, cafes and the local hotel, known as "The Esplanade", or "Espy".

== Brighton jetty ==
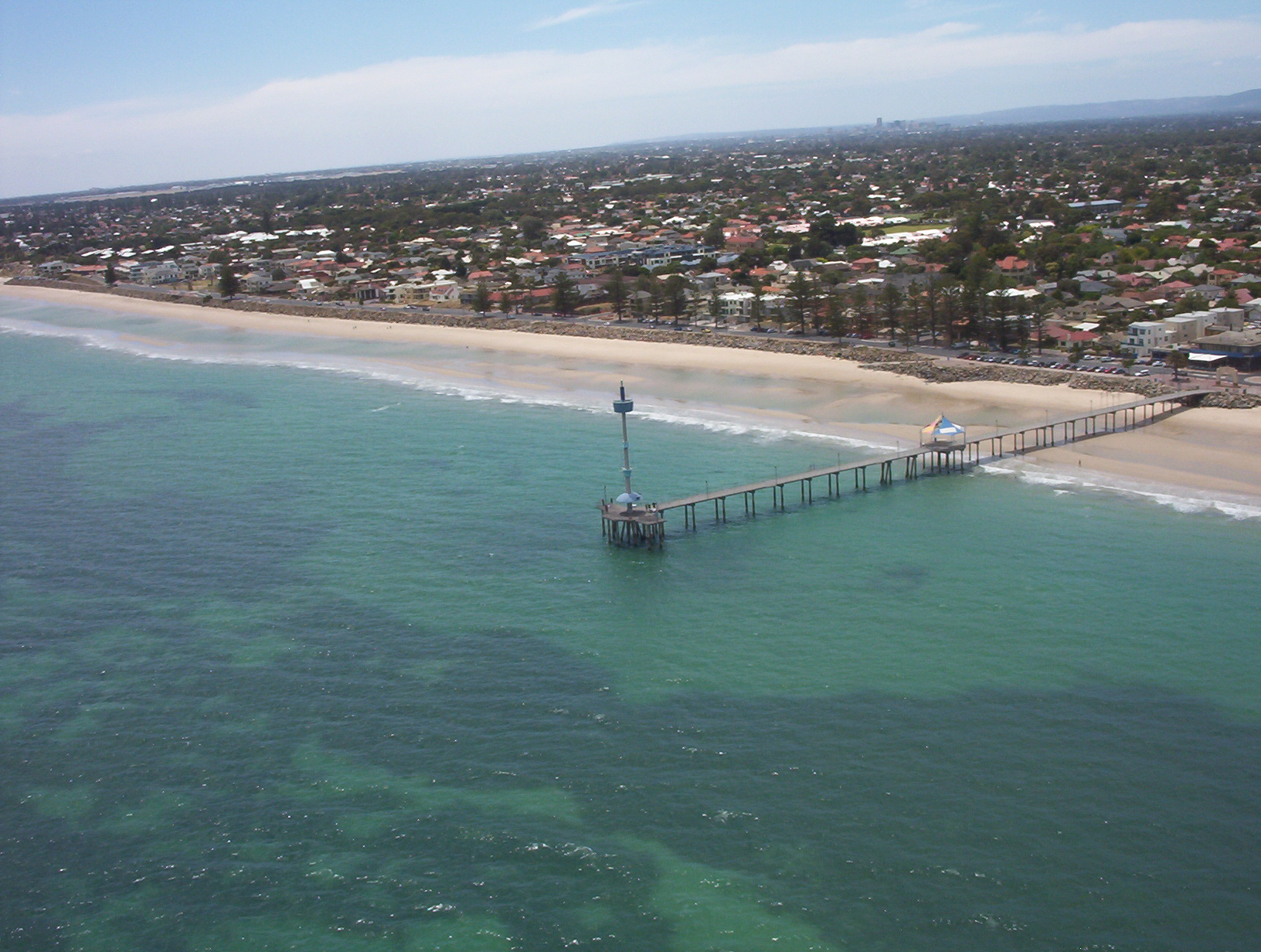
Brighton – Looking northeast from over the water

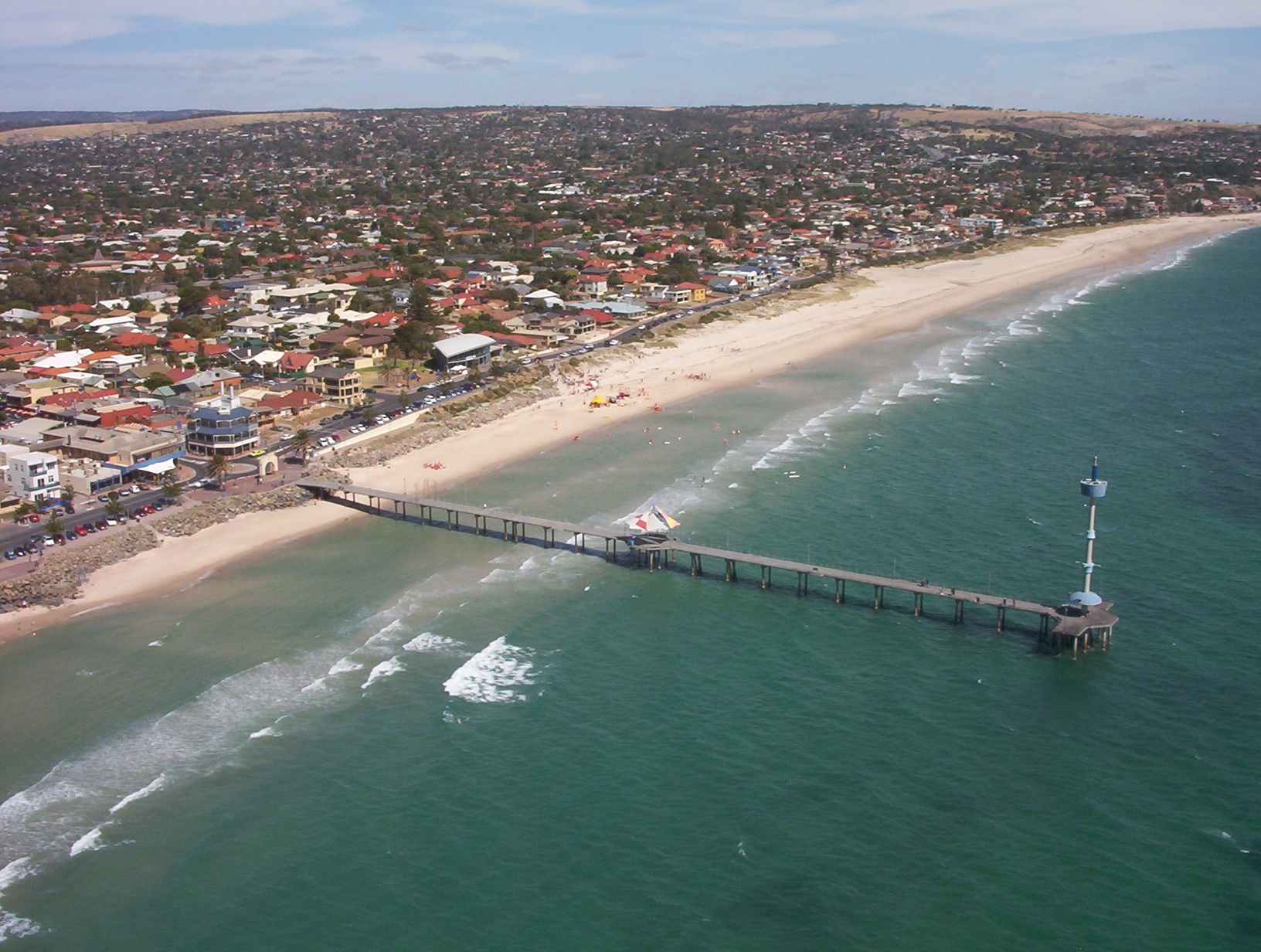
Brighton – Looking southeast from over the water

The original Brighton Jetty was built in 1886 and stood for over 100 years. The jetty was badly damaged by winter storms in 1994 and was rebuilt using funds supplied by a mobile phone service provider, hence the telecommunications tower on the end of the jetty.

In 1926 the women of Brighton installed a drinking fountain near the entrance of the jetty to commemorate the death of Kathleen Duncan Whyte, who was fatally attacked by a shark while swimming.

At the shore end of the jetty is a War Memorial arch. Here, traditional Dawn Services are held annually on Anzac Day to commemorate fallen service men and women.

== Events and attractions ==
Brighton is the home of the Brighton Jetty Classic, an Open Water Swim made up of the 1500 metre Brighton Jetty Classic Swim and the 400 metre Jetty Swim, aimed at first time open water swimmers. The Brighton Jetty Classic had its first year in 2006 when approximately 800 swimmers successfully completed the event. It is an annual event, being hosted on the first Sunday in February. The 2010 event had over 1200 swimmers, making it the largest open water swim in South Australia. The course is around the Brighton Jetty, which makes the Jetty a fantastic viewing platform for spectators.

Brighton Oval is the largest sporting complex in the City of Holdfast Bay. It features a skatepark as well as football, lacrosse, cricket and rugby union clubs.

=== Windsor Theatre ===
The Windsor Theatre is located at 1 Commercial Road. Opened in 1925, the picture theatre was owned by the Freemasons (South Australian Lodge of Friendship). Unusually, the proscenium was situated in the centre of the building and was shared by two auditoriums. By 1949, the lease had been acquired by Ozone Theatres Ltd.

The Windsor continues to operate as of December 2022, charging A$10 per session. It often shows double features, and its screenings include both mainstream films and indie / arthouse films. It is one of very few cinemas from the era of silent films still standing and operating as a cinema in Adelaide.

== Cement works ==
Although named Adbri, a portmanteau of Adelaide and Brighton, the cement works are located in the nearby Marino.
