= Seacombe Heights, South Australia =

Seacombe Heights
- Suburb
- Country: Australia
- State: South Australia
- City: Adelaide
- LGA: City of Marion

Government
  - State electorate: Black
  - Federal division: Boothby

Population
  - Total: 1,549 (SAL 2021)
- Postcode: 5047
Suburbs around Seacombe Heights
Dover Gardens	Seacombe Gardens	Sturt
Seaview Downs	Seacombe Heights	Darlington
Trott Park	O'Halloran Hill

Seacombe Heights is a suburb of Adelaide in the City of Marion, South Australia. It gets its name from Seacombe on the Wirral Cheshire, where many settlers emigrated from.

Area highlights include the Seacombe Heights Tennis Club on Grafton Street, where courts can be hired by the public. Seaview High School is located on a large land parcel within Seacombe Heights and features a large irrigated oval, popular with locals outside of school hours.

Many Seacombe Heights locals enjoy nature walks in the O'Halloran Hill Conservation park.

== See also ==
- List of Adelaide suburbs
