= George McNeilage =

Australian rules footballer

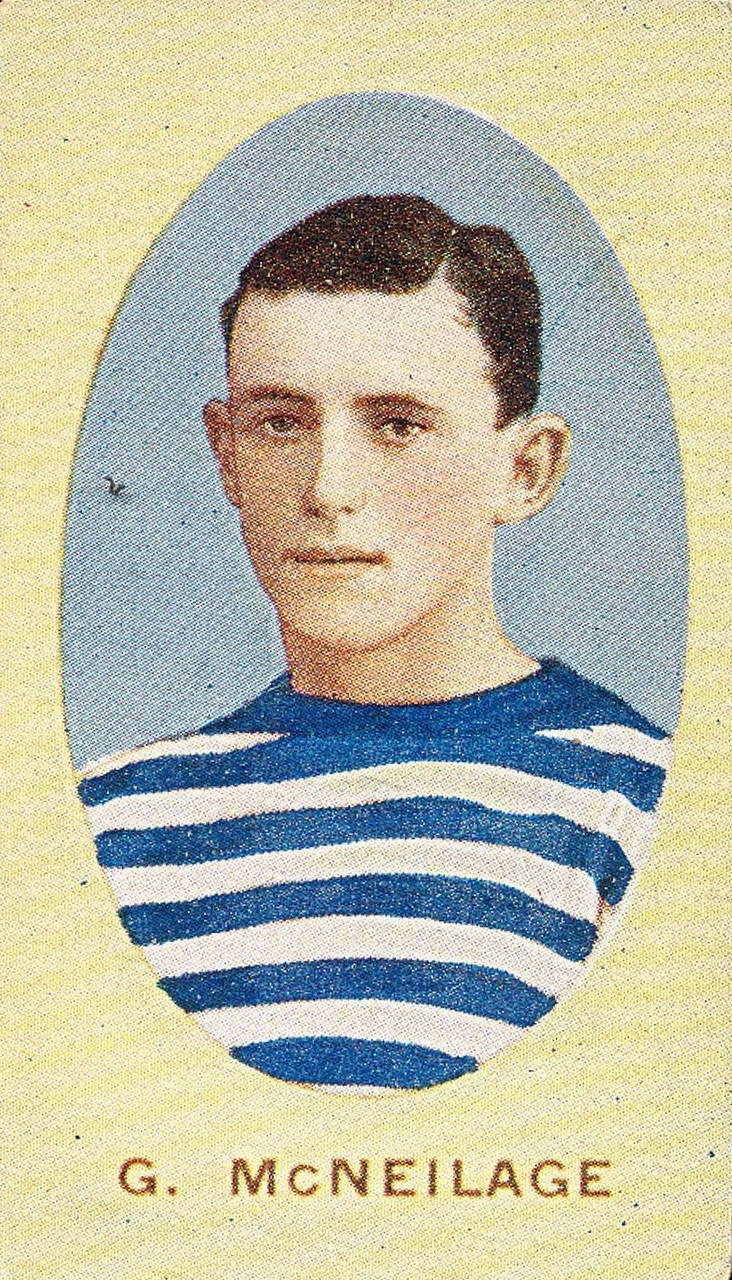
- Cigarette card of McNeilage in 1910

Personal information
- Full name: George Campbell McNeilage
- Born: 3 August 1890; Port Melbourne, Victoria
- Died: 20 March 1967 (aged 76); Brighton, South Australia
- Original team: Geelong
- Height: 173-177 cm
- Weight: 71 kg (157 lb)

Playing career^{1}
Years	Club	Games (Goals)
1907	Geelong	5 (1)
1909	Melbourne	1 (0)
Total		6 (1)
- ^{1} Playing statistics correct to the end of 1909.

George Campbell McNeilage (3 August 1890 – 20 March 1967) was an Australian rules footballer who played with Geelong and Melbourne in the Victorian Football League (VFL). In addition, he played in the 1st Football XVIII 1905–1908, and held the role of Captain of Boats between 1907 and 1908.
