= Seacliff (disambiguation) =

Seacliff or Sea Cliff or Sea Cliffe may refer to:

== Places ==
=== Australia ===
- Seacliff, South Australia, suburb of Adelaide
- Seacliff Park, South Australia, a suburb of Adelaide
- Sea Cliff Bridge, in Illawarra, New South Wales

=== New Zealand ===
- Seacliff, New Zealand, settlement in Otago, New Zealand
  - Seacliff Lunatic Asylum, a former mental hospital near the settlement

=== United Kingdom ===
- Seacliff, a beach, estate and harbour near North Berwick, Scotland.
- Sea Cliffe, Ballure Road, Ramsey, Isle of Man, one of Isle of Man's Registered Buildings

=== United States ===
- Seacliff, California, a census-designated place near Aptos, California
- Seacliff State Beach, a California State Beach in Aptos, California
- Sea Cliff, California, a community in Ventura County
- Sea Cliff, San Francisco, California, a neighborhood in San Francisco County
- Sea Cliff, New York

== Ship ==
- DSV Sea Cliff, U.S. Navy research deep submergence vehicle
