= Darlington, South Australia =

Darlington
- Suburb
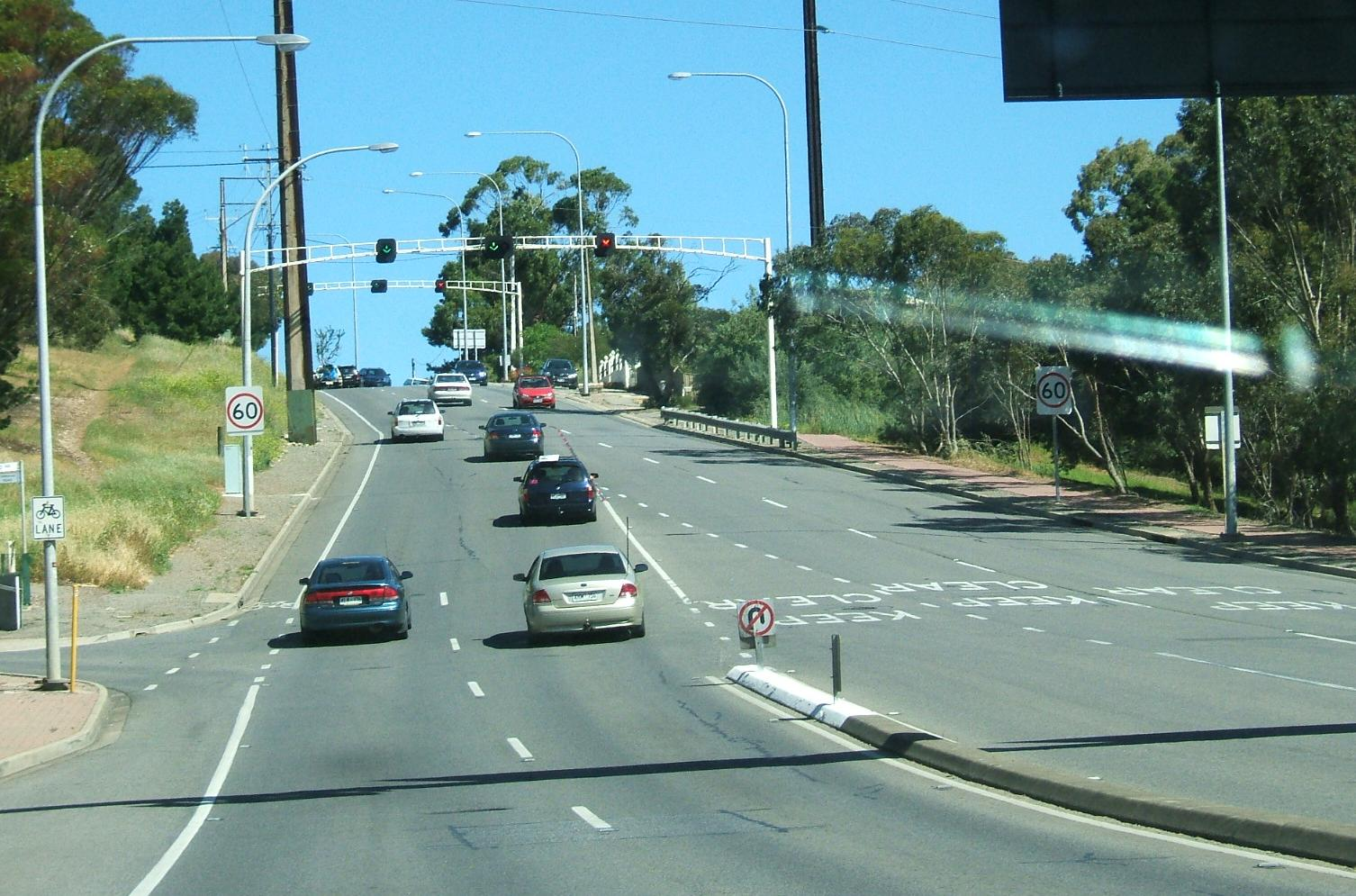
- Flagstaff Hill Road, Darlington

- Country: Australia
- State: South Australia
- Region: Southern Adelaide
- City: Adelaide
- LGAs: City of Marion; City of Onkaparinga
- Location: 14 km (8.7 mi) south of Adelaide city centre

Government
  - State electorate: Black
  - Federal divisions: Boothby; Kingston

Population
  - Total: 1,275 (SAL 2021)
- Postcode: 5047
- County: Adelaide
Suburbs around Darlington
Seacombe Gardens	Sturt	Bedford Park
Seacombe Heights	Darlington	Flagstaff Hill
	O'Halloran Hill

Darlington is a suburb of Adelaide, South Australia part of which is in the City of Onkaparinga and the City of Marion. For many years, Darlington was the southern entrance to Adelaide's urban area on Main South Road. It hosted many service stations of different brands. It represents the convergence of Flagstaff Road to Main South Road from the south, with Seacombe Road to the west, Diagonal Road to the northwest and Marion Road to the north with South Road continuing northeast. The new upgrades are taking place here and most are complete.

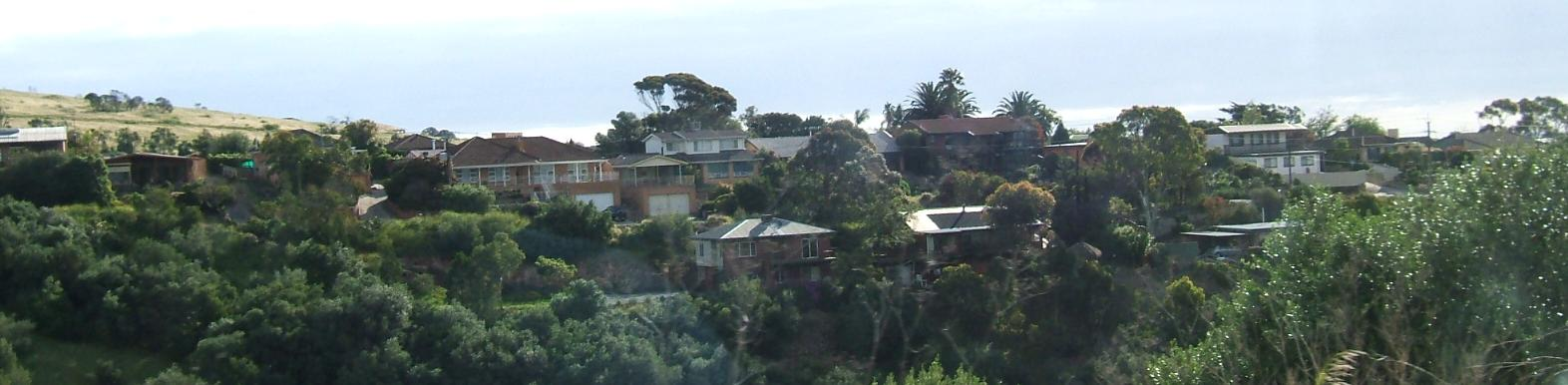
Houses in Darlington

In about 1851, the village of Darlington was created and named by Samuel William Lewis, the licensed victualler of the Flagstaff Inn, after the market town in County Durham in North East England named Darlington. Lewis was the licensed victualler of the Flagstaff Inn during these years 1848-1853 – 1858 – 1860–1864.

Lewis was a stone mason by trade, and he was contracted to erect the first two public memorials in the colony. The first was a memorial to Colonel William Light erected in 1843 over the site of his grave in Light Square. The second was the monument to Matthew Flinders at Stamford Hill near Port Lincoln in 1844.

== See also ==
- List of Adelaide suburbs
