= Seaview Downs, South Australia =

Seaview Downs
- Suburb
- Country: Australia
- State: South Australia
- City: Adelaide
- LGA: City of Marion

Government
  - State electorate: Black
  - Federal division: Boothby

Population
  - Total: 2,718 (SAL 2021)
- Postcode: 5049
Suburbs around Seaview Downs
South Brighton	Dover Gardens	Seacombe Gardens
Seacliff Park	Seaview Downs	Seacombe Heights
Hallett Cove	Trott Park	O'Halloran Hill

Seaview Downs is a suburb of Adelaide in the City of Marion, South Australia. The southern part of the suburb contains the O'Halloran Hill Recreation Park.

== See also ==
- List of Adelaide suburbs
