= Dover Gardens, South Australia =

Dover Gardens
- Suburb
- Country: Australia
- State: South Australia
- City: Adelaide
- LGA: City of Marion

Government
  - State electorate: Gibson
  - Federal division: Boothby

Population
  - Total: 3,062 (SAL 2021)
- Postcode: 5048
Suburbs around Dover Gardens
Brighton	Warradale	Oaklands Park, Westfield Marion
South Brighton	Dover Gardens	Seacombe Gardens
Seacliff Park	Seaview Downs	Seacombe Heights

Dover Gardens is a suburb of Adelaide, South Australia, in the City of Marion.

== History ==
Settlement of the area dates from the mid-1800s, with land used mainly for farming, orchards and vineyards. Some growth took place from the late 1800s into the 1920s. Substantial development did not occur until after the Second World War, with rapid growth during the 1950s and 1960s. The population fluctuated slightly between 1991 and 2006, due to small changes in dwelling stock and the average number of persons living in each dwelling. The population increased between 2006 and 2011 as new dwellings were added to the area, particularly medium density housing.

== Points of interest ==
Points of interest include Pattriti Winery, Branksome Terrace Reserve, McKay Street Reserve, and Scarborough Terrace Reserve.

== See also ==
- List of Adelaide suburbs
