= City of Holdfast Bay =

Coordinates: 35°1′S 138°31′E

- Local government area
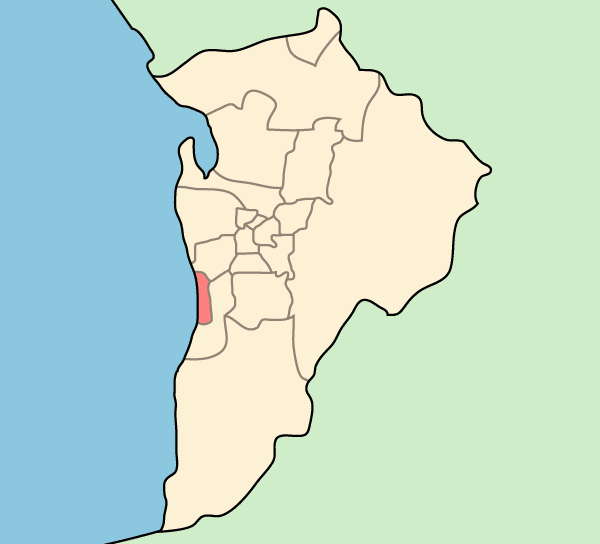

- Interactive map of City of Holdfast Bay
- Country: Australia
- State: South Australia
- Region: Southern Adelaide
- Council seat: Brighton

Government
  - Mayor: Amanda Wilson
  - State electorate: Bright, Morphett
  - Federal division: Boothby, Hindmarsh

Area
  - Total: 13.72 km^{2} (5.30 sq mi)

Population
  - Total: 37,543 (LGA 2021)
  - Density: 2,736.37/km^{2} (7,087.2/sq mi)
- Website: City of Holdfast Bay
LGAs around City of Holdfast Bay
City of West Torrens	City of West Torrens
City of Holdfast Bay	City of Marion
City of Marion	City of Marion

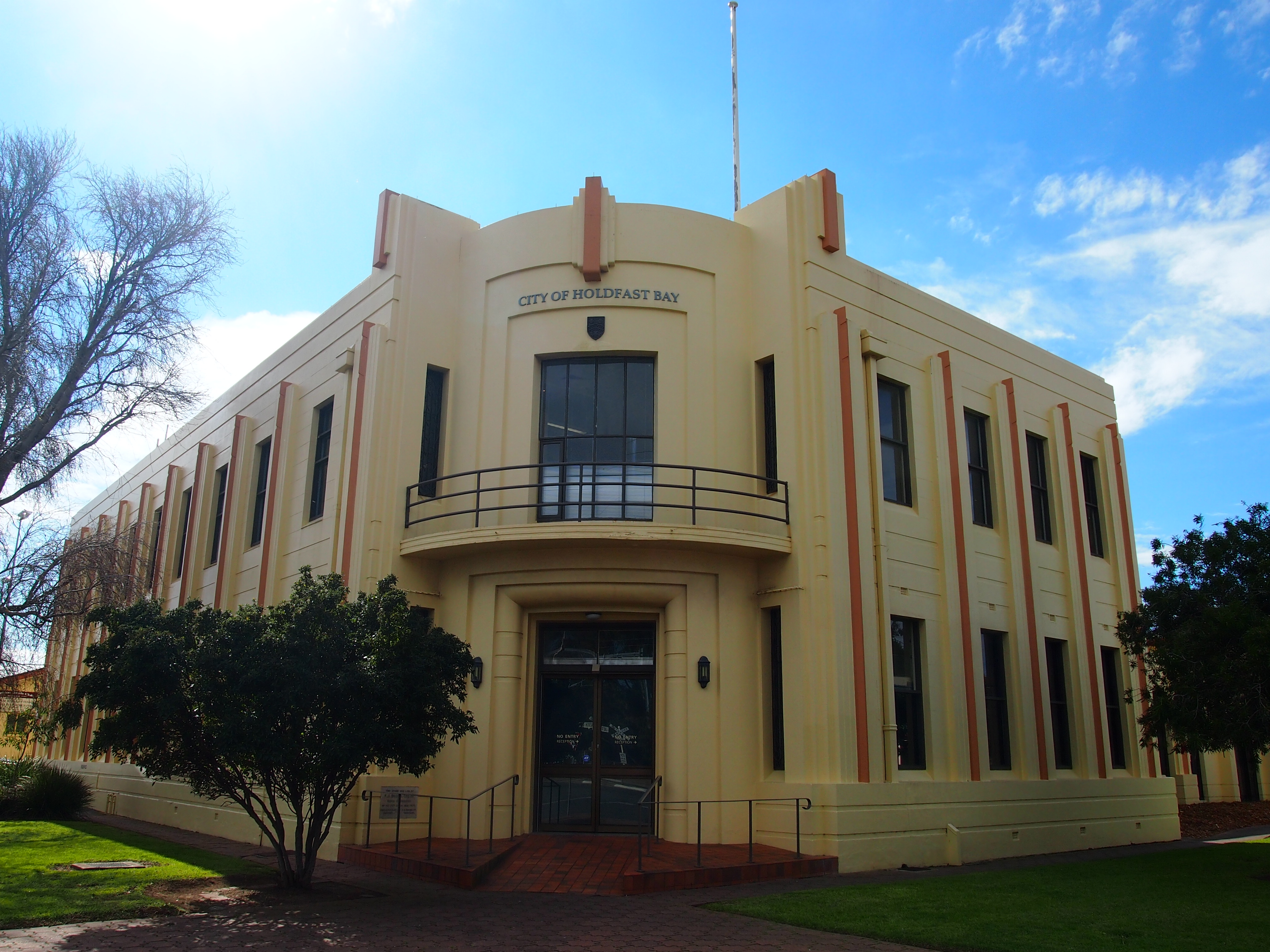
City of Holdfast Bay municipal offices in Brighton (formerly the Brighton Town Hall), opened in 1937

The City of Holdfast Bay is a local government area in the south-western coastal suburbs of Adelaide, South Australia.

== History ==
The council was formed on 1 January 1997, when the City of Glenelg and City of Brighton councils were amalgamated by the state government. As a result, there are two council offices, one in the historic Glenelg Town Hall on Moseley Square and the other on Jetty Road, Brighton.

== Council ==
=== Current composition ===
The current council as of March 2025 is:

Ward	Party	Councillor	Notes
Mayor	Liberal	Amanda Wilson	
Brighton	Independent	Anthony Venning	
Brighton	Independent	Robert Snewin	
Brighton	Liberal	Jane Fleming	
Glenelg	Independent	Bob Patton	
Glenelg	Independent	Rebecca Abley	
Glenelg	Independent	Allison Kane	
Seacliff	Independent	Annette Bradshaw	
Seacliff	Independent	Susan Lonie	
Seacliff	Independent	Clare Lindop	
Somerton	Independent	Monique O’Donohue	
Somerton	Independent	John Smedley	
Somerton	Independent	Will Miller	

== Mayors ==
The Council has had 4 mayors: Brian Nadilo (1997-2006), Ken Rollond (2006-2014), Stephen Patterson (2014-2017) and Amanda Wilson (2018-).

== Suburbs ==
- Brighton (5048)
- Glenelg (5045)
- Glenelg East (5045)
- Glenelg North (5045)
- Glenelg South (5045)
- Hove (5048)
- Kingston Park (5049)
- North Brighton (5048)
- Seacliff (5049)
- Seacliff Park (5049)
- Somerton Park (5044)
- South Brighton (5048)

== Wards ==
The council consists of four Wards: Glenelg, Somerton, Brighton and Seacliff. Each Ward is represented by three Ward Councillors.

== Sister city ==
There is one Sister city to Holdfast Bay.

Hayama, Kanagawa, Japan

== See also ==
- List of Adelaide parks and gardens
