= Seacliff, South Australia =

Suburb of Adelaide, Australia

Seacliff
- Suburb
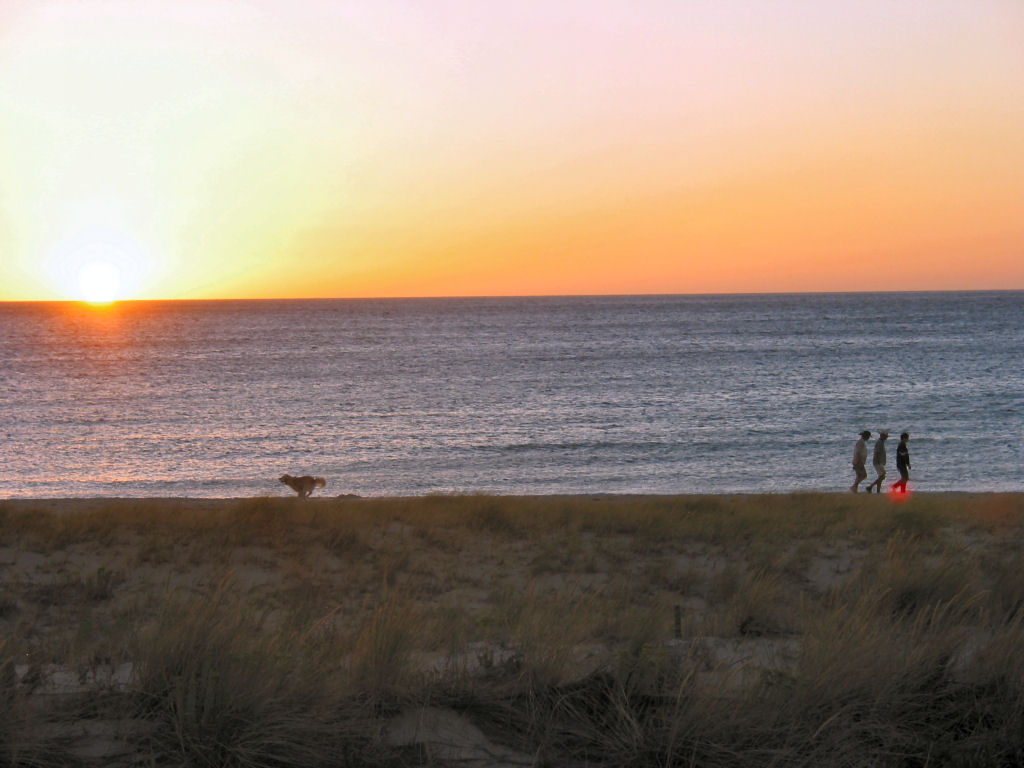
- The beach at Seacliff

- Coordinates: 35.033494°S 138.519522°E
- Country: Australia
- State: South Australia
- City: Adelaide
- LGA: City of Holdfast Bay

Government
  - State electorate: Black
  - Federal division: Boothby

Population
  - Total: 2,117 (SAL 2021)
- Postcode: 5049
Suburbs around Seacliff
Gulf St Vincent	South Brighton	South Brighton
Gulf St Vincent	Seacliff	South Brighton; Seacliff Park
Gulf St Vincent	Kingston Park; Marino	Seacliff Park

Seacliff is a coastal suburb located in the capital city of South Australia; Adelaide. Overseen by the council, City of Holdfast Bay, this suburb is adjacent to South Brighton, Seacliff Park, Marino and Kingston Park.

Seacliff Post Office opened on 1 July 1915 and closed in 1978.

== History ==
=== Heritage listings ===
The suburb of Seacliff has an extensive list of heritage listed locations all deemed to have historical value.

The Seacliff Hotel built in 1927, originally named the Hotel Australia and renamed in 1935, was proposed to be heritage listed in 1998. It received great publicity for being the headquarters for the English Test Cricketers during the Adelaide Test in the 1935 and 1936 tour.

The Brighton and Seacliff Yacht Club formed in 1919, and later had its clubrooms built in 1927 after land was purchased by Tom Mayfield Hardy. It became home club to nationally and internationally renowned yachtsmen Sir James Hardy, and in 1966 hosted the 505 World Championships.

=== European settlement and development ===
Originally landing in 1836, Colonel William Light aboard the Rapid finally scouted somewhere he deemed suitable for settling. This was after rejecting locations of Kangaroo Island, Port Lincoln and Encounter Bay. He named the bay which he stood "Holdfast Bay" after the Rapid's anchor held as a storm blew in. Once Governor John Hindmarsh arrived and agreed to settle, South Australia was born, as the official proclamation of colonial government in South Australia was conducted. The location they landed would later be named Glenelg, which is north of Seacliff and shares the same stretch of beach. Settlement and colonising immediately begun and this led to the development across the coast and into Seacliff

The coast between Seacliff and Outer Harbor (at the Port River estuary) is more interfered with by man with urban development than any other coast in South Australia. Before European Settlement in the area, which started in the mid-1800s, there were large sand dune systems that spanned the coast all the way from the South of Kingston Park to the North of Outer Harbor, including the areas of Seacliff. These sand dunes extended for 30 km, were 20m high and travelled as far as 300m inland Development over time removed the majority of the existing sand dune systems which naturally provided replenishments of sand. The diminishing of these sand dunes caused adverse effects to the condition of the coastline and existing ecosystems.

To counteract the damage that development caused to the coastline and to maintain healthy beaches within and north of Seacliff, the protective measures of building breakwaters and groynes was undergone to prevent the natural drift of sand moving North away from Glenelg. This alongside sand replenishment using an automated pumping system has ensured the maintenance of coastal development and sand supply for Seacliff Beach.

== Indigenous significance ==
The traditional owners and custodians of the land, the Kaurna people, are the original people of Adelaide and the Adelaide plains.

Sand dunes near the shore located North of Seacliff and South of Largs Bay and Osborne, were once used to make camps for dances and ceremonies. The vast majority have long since been replaced by development, housing and by the Glenelg Wastewater Treatment Plant which was first commissioned in 1933. These dunes were also an important source of food and shelter for the Kaurna People as they provided a natural habitat for animals such as birds, reptiles and insects, as well as providing natural storm and tide protection.

Witu-wattingga (or Wituwartingga) has become the accepted Kaurna name for the area from Seacliff to Brighton, although its origin is probably arose through confusion with Wita-wattingga, the certified Kaurna name for an area around present-day Seacliff Park, meaning "in the midst of peppermint gums". There is, however, a Kaurna language meaning for witu-watti, meaning "reeds in the middle" (or "in the midst of reeds"), so could be applied to some small, intermittent swamps with reeds in the area, such as the now extinct one near Young Street at the mouth of Seacombe Creek.

== Environmental conservation ==
=== Sand dunes ===
The City of Holdfast Bay in 2019 delivered a plan to improve the dunes along the coast including Seacliff. This includes combating the effects of development, human trampling and weed infestation of the sand dunes. Proposed methods of management involve breaking the areas of concern into management zones, removing damaging plant species such as weeds from the area, conducting re-vegetation and re-introduction of critical sand dune components which were removed or made missing by human intervention.

These planned efforts outline the aim to improve the population of the endangered Hooded Plover habituating on Seacliff's shores. Specifically, by introducing continued signage and awareness, temporary fencing, chick shelters and monitoring. Also, the plan outlines the aim to combat the lack of native species of Fordune and Swale by re-vegetation.

== Recreational activities ==
The main recreational activities for Seacliff are water-based activities such as swimming, surfing, snorkelling, boating, yachting and fishing.

Surfing is a recreational activity offered within Seacliff. With the stretch of beach including Seacliff being Adelaide's and South Australia's most popular, Seacliff Beach is patrolled by the Seacliff Surf Life Saving Club which on the southern end of the Esplanade at Seacliff. The Seacliff Surf Life Saving Club was initially founded in 1930 and located near the Seacliff Beach Hotel. Later in 1950 the clubhouse moved to its current position and in 2011 received a complete rebuild in conjunction with the City of Holdfast Bay and the South Australian Government.

Fishing is popular along the stretch of beach including Seacliff, with the Seacliff rock flats being an attractive spot due to it being the Glenelg breakwater. Seacliff Beach has also been host to net fishing with fishers using the water as far back as 1930.

Snorkelling is available in Seacliff and the adjacent coastal suburbs. There are a number of reefs reachable from Seacliff Beach including the Seacliff Reef which is 4 kilometres (2.5 mi) from shore and is one of Adelaide's most popular spots. Visible fish include blue devils, boarfish, cuttlefish, nudibranchs, leatherjackets, bullseyes, wrasse, blue gropers and leafy seadragons.

Sight-seeing is also a recreational activity offered by the suburb of Seacliff as the aesthetic value of Seacliff's views of beaches and cliffs has been appraised, as well as the views from neighbouring suburbs.

Seacliff is home to boaters and yachters with the Brighton and Seacliff Yacht Club celebrating its 100-year anniversary in 2019, and being based on the Southern end of the Esplanade in Seacliff.

Thanks to relatively safe waters, Seacliff's beach and the adjacent beaches are suitable for swimming as there are low waves and a far-spanning shallow bar. It is known however that strong currents can occur near the Patawalonga breakwater. Caution should be taken near the rocks at Seacliff, around the two jetties on the stretch of beach, and in the bar, where occasional breaks occur leading to an increased water depth.

== Demographics ==
=== Population ===
Historical population
Year	Pop.	±%
2001	1,735	—
2006	1,769	+2.0%
2011	1,954	+10.5%
2016	1,957	+0.2%

In the 2016 Australian census, the population of Seacliff was 1,957 people, with 950 people (48.7%) being male and 1000 people (51.3%) being female.

The median age of people in Seacliff was 44, and there were 555 families, with the average children for families with children was 1.7.

There were 9 people recorded as identifying as Aboriginal and/or Torres Strait Islander people, making up 0.5% of the population. This is compared with the state measurement of 2% in South Australia and the country measurement in Australia of 2.8%.

=== Housing ===
The total number of private dwellings owned was 921, with about 2.3 people per household. The median weekly household income for Seacliff was $1,610 and the median monthly mortgage repayment was $1,950. For rent, the median weekly amount was $321. Each dwelling was found to be on average containing 1.7 motor vehicles.

Of the number of private dwellings in Seacliff, 796 were occupied (89.5%) and 93 were unoccupied (10.5%).

=== Ancestry ===
900 respondents identified as having English ancestry (33.4%), 633 respondents identified as having Australian ancestry (23.5%), 232 respondents identified as having Irish ancestry (8.6%), 228 respondents identified as having Scottish ancestry (23.5%) and 152 respondents identified as having German ancestry (5.6%).

Seacliff was measured to have a higher percentage of English ancestry than the percentage in South Australia (28.5%), lower percentage of Australian ancestry than South Australia's (25.0%), higher percentage of Irish ancestry than South Australia's (6.0%) and higher percentage of Scottish ancestry than that of South Australia (6.3%). German ancestry in Seacliff was measured to be just lower than that of the percentage in South Australia (5.8%).

=== Religious Affiliation ===
Within Seacliff, the five most predominant responses for religious affiliation were No Religion with 839 people (43.1%), Catholic with 357 people (18.3%), Anglican with 266 people (13.7%), Not Stated with 156 people (8.0%) and Uniting Church with 143 people (7.3%).

=== Transit to work ===
Respondents to the 2016 ABS census said they travel to work by; driving a car (62.8%), train (9.7%), car as a passenger (3.3%), by bicycle (1.6%). With 4.3% of responders claiming they work from home.

=== Occupation ===
The most common occupations of respondents to the 2016 ABS census were; Professionals (31.8%), Managers (15.1%), Clerical and Administrative Workers (12.8%), Sales Workers (10.9%), Technicians and Trades Workers (10.0%), Community and Personal Service Workers (9.8%), Labourers (5.9%) and Machinery Operators and Drivers (2.1%).

=== Language ===
The top five most common responses other than English from respondents to the 2016 ABS census said they speak; Italian (0.8%), German (0.6%), Swedish (0.4%), Greek (0.4%) and Portuguese (0.4%). With 88.8% of responders claiming they only spoke English at home.

== See also ==
- List of Adelaide suburbs
- Seacliff (disambiguation)
