= Brighton Jetty Classic =

Brighton Jetty Classic is an open water swim held in Adelaide, South Australia, Australia each year on the first Sunday in February. There are two races, the 1500 metre Brighton Jetty Classic, and the 400 metre Jetty Fun Swim. The race attracts fields of up to 1000 swimmers and is the largest open water swim by numbers in South Australia. In 2007 the fast lap was also introduced. This is an invited sprint race around the Brighton Jetty for the Fastest Qualifying Swimmers.

The Race began in 2006 and approximately 800 swimmers were registered. By 2010, the event was receiving over 1200 entries. The Brighton Jetty Classic was the winner of the Event Category in the 2006 Recreation & Sport Industry Awards, and The City of Holdfast Bay Major Event Award 2007..

The 400 metre jetty fun swim has a beach start and beach finish around the Brighton Jetty. The 1500 metre Brighton Jetty Classic has a water start and beach finish. The course is based around the Brighton Jetty and the Jetty itself makes an ideal viewing platform for the spectacular race.

The race is organised by the Brighton Surf Lifesaving Club as a way of raising funds for its new building. However, due to the success of the event, significant money was raised for over 100 different sporting groups and charities. Five dollars from every entry went to a charity named by the entrant while a separate race was held to raise money for the Flinders Hospital Neo-Natal Unit, the Breast Cancer Society and the Royal Society for the Blind.

== Previous Winners ==
1500m Swim Winners
| Year | Male Winner | Female Winner |
|---|---|---|
| 2006 | James Cordner | Briana Parsons |
| 2007 | Kate Brookes-Peterson | Kate Brookes-Peterson |
| 2008 | James Fennel | Kallie Rump |
| 2009 | Adrian Waydock | Lauren Marsh |
| 2010 | James Fennell | Kallie Rump |
| 2011 | Patrick Cobiac | Leah Cutting |
| 2012 | - | - |
| 2013 | James Fennell | Leah Cutting |
| 2014 | Patrick Cobiac | Leah Cutting |
| 2015 | Sam Tierney | Leah Jones |
| 2016 | Ethan Owens | Emily Liu |
| 2017 | Mark Ducaj | Lucy Derbyshire |
| 2018 | Ethan Owens | Bethan Mounfield |
| 2019 | Patrick Cobiac | Bethan Mounfield |
| 2020 | Patrick Cobiac | Emily White |
| 2021 | Clancy Luscombe | Emily White |
| 2022 | Clancy Luscombe | Katie Natt |
| 2023 | Clancy Luscombe | Emily White |

== Sculptures Competition ==
The Brighton Jetty Classic Sculptures Competition was inspired by Brighton Surf Life Saving members after experiencing Sculptures at Cottesloe Beach, WA, the latter event modeled on the famous Bondi Sculptures.

The vision is to continue to hold a major arts event in conjunction with the successful annual Brighton Jetty Classic Swim. The combination of both arts and sport is a unique and successful community event. Sculptures large and small for outdoor and indoor display are made from multi media compositions i.e. wood, wire, glass, metals, stone, clay, plastics, cement etc. During the event, sculptures are displayed both inside the Brighton Surf Club, and outside in the Bindara Reserve. In 2011 a "sculptures walk" was initiated. Chosen sculptures were placed on the esplanade to create a 400-metre walk from Beach Road to well north of the Brighton Jetty. This fabulous concept was expanded further in 2012, with more sculptures carefully placed with an ocean background.

While continuing with the successful exhibition of indoor sculptures, the outdoor component of the sculptures competition has been turned into a walk along the esplanade, placing sculptures in a natural beach setting. Artists are encouraged to produce pieces that will match the location, combining art and the beach environment. 2011 also added a new category for best environmental piece.

2012 was a record breaking event with over 110 pieces entered.

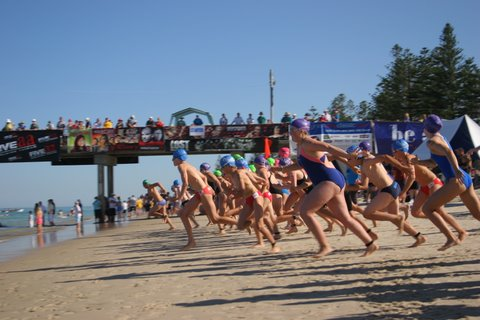
Competitors Entering the water at the start of the race.

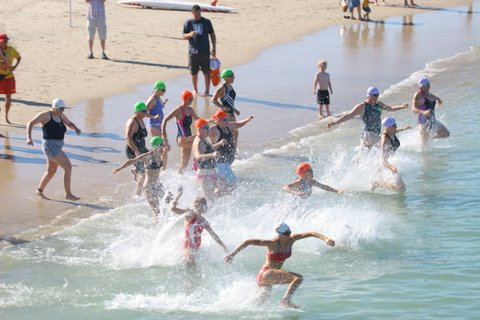
The view of the race from the Brighton Jetty.

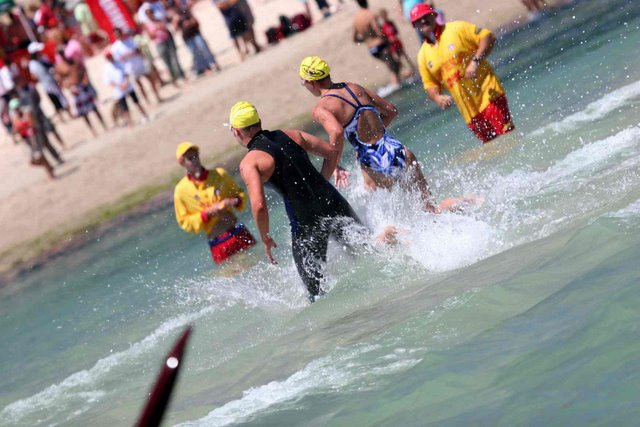
The winners of the 2007 Open Women's heading for the finish line.
