= South Brighton, South Australia =

South Brighton
- Suburb
- Coordinates: 35°01′38″S 138°31′26″E
- Country: Australia
- State: South Australia
- City: Adelaide
- LGA: City of Holdfast Bay
- Location: 13 km (8.1 mi) from Adelaide

Government
  - State electorate: Black
  - Federal division: Hindmarsh

Population
  - Total: 2,763 (SAL 2021)
- Postcode: 5048
Suburbs around South Brighton
Gulf St Vincent	Brighton	Dover Gardens
Gulf St Vincent	South Brighton	Dover Gardens
Gulf St Vincent	Seacliff; Seacliff Park	Seaview Downs

South Brighton is a small, primarily residential suburb of Adelaide in South Australia.

Brighton South Post Office opened on 7 November 1961. It was renamed South Brighton in 1968 and replaced by the Seacliff Park office in 1995.
