= Reynella East, South Australia =

Reynella East
- Suburb
- Country: Australia
- State: South Australia
- Region: Southern Adelaide
- City: Adelaide

Government
  - State electorate: Hurtle Vale
  - Federal division: Kingston

Population
  - Total: 1,990 (SAL 2021)
- Postcode: 5161
- County: Adelaide
Suburbs around Reynella East
Trott Valley	Happy Valley	Happy Valley
Old Reynella	Reynella East	Happy Valley
Old Reynella	Woodcraft	Woodcraft

Reynella East is a metropolitan suburb of Adelaide, South Australia. It lies within the City of Onkaparinga and has postcode 5161. It is one of the smallest suburbs in South Australia.
