= Trott Park, South Australia =

Trott Park
- Suburb
- Coordinates: 35°04′24″S 138°32′22″E
- Country: Australia
- State: South Australia
- City: Adelaide
- LGA: City of Marion

Government
  - State electorate: Black
  - Federal division: Kingston

Population
  - Total: 3,124 (SAL 2021)
- Postcode: 5158
Suburbs around Trott Park
Marino	Seaview Downs	O'Halloran Hill
Sheidow Park	Trott Park	Happy Valley
Reynella	Old Reynella	Reynella East

Trott Park is a suburb in the south of Adelaide, South Australia. It has a population of 3,124 people (2021 Census).

It is surrounded in the most part by open space: the O'Halloran Hill Recreation Park, and Roseworthy Park, a former CSIRO landhold. It is also bordered by Sheidow Park, Hallett Cove and O'Halloran Hill. The Ityamaiitpinna Yarra (Glenthorne National park), Southern Expressway, Sam Willoughby BMX track and the Hallett Cove soccer club are situated close to the suburb.

The Coast to Vines rail trail passes through the suburb.

Trott Park is in the City of Marion local government area, the South Australian House of Assembly electoral district of Black and the Australian House of Representatives Division of Kingston.

== Walking and Cycling Trails ==
The Coast to Vines rail trail passes through the suburb. Heading north the trail finishes at Marino and heading south the trail finishes at Willunga.

== See also ==
- List of Adelaide suburbs
