= Kingston Park, South Australia =

Kingston Park
- Suburb
- Coordinates: 35°02′25″S 138°30′58″E
- Country: Australia
- State: South Australia
- Region: Southern Adelaide
- City: Adelaide
- LGA: City of Holdfast Bay

Government
  - State electorate: Black
  - Federal division: Boothby

Population
  - Total: 623 (SAL 2021)
- Postcode: 5049
- County: Adelaide
Suburbs around Kingston Park
	Seacliff
Gulf St Vincent	Kingston Park	Seacliff
	Marino

Kingston Park is a small beachside suburb, 17 kilometres (11 mi) south of the Adelaide city centre. Kingston Park is within the City of Holdfast Bay and flanked by the neighbouring suburbs of Marino to the south and Seacliff to the north and east.

There is a Kaurna site of significance, the freshwater spring known as Tulukudangga, which is part of the Tjilbruke Dreaming Track. There is also a coastal reserve, a caravan park and a kiosk. The plant life of the cliff face includes a number of endangered or vulnerable species.

== History ==
The Kaurna people inhabited the area before European settlement. As per the Aboriginal oral history and dreamtime mythology, the creator ancestor, Tjilbruke, carried his dead nephew, Kulultuwi, from the spring, known as Tulukudangga, to Jervis Bay. Above the spring on the cliff top is a lookout with views across the Gulf St Vincent, featuring the Tjilbruke Monument by South Australian sculptor John Dowie.

The Kingston family, the namesake of this suburb, were early landholders in this area. George Strickland Kingston was deputy surveyor in command of the Cygnet which landed at Holdfast Bay on 5 November 1836. His son, Charles Cameron Kingston was instrumental in drafting the Commonwealth Bill of Federation.

== Location ==
The suburb is 17 kilometres (11 mi) south of the Adelaide city centre, within the City of Holdfast Bay and flanked by the neighbouring suburbs of Marino to the south and Seacliff to the north and east.

== Flora and fauna ==
The Kingston cliff face is home to 80 indigenous plant species, including harlequin mistletoe (Lysiana exocarpi) and sticky boobialla (Myoporum viscosum). A third of the indigenous coastal cliff vegetation is endangered or vulnerable. Bird, animal and insects include the mistletoebird (Dicaeum hirundinaceum), the shingleback lizard (Tiliqua rugosa) and the trapdoor spider.

== Facilities ==
The cliff face has three walking trails with a good level of fitness required and not accessible by wheelchairs. The northern rocky beach area to the south is ideal for fishing and exploring rock pools, while the beach at Kingston Park is usually calm and shallow for some distance.

The Kingston Park Coastal Reserve, a small park with tennis courts, swings, barbecue and toilet facilities are located above the beach, with views out to the sea.

The Brighton Caravan Park and Holiday Village is located in Kingston Park right next to the beach, and there is a road parking and café adjacent to this.

== 2019: Repatriation of Aboriginal remains ==
On 1 August 2019, the remains of 11 Kaurna people were laid to rest at a ceremony led by elder Jeffrey Newchurch at the Coastal Reserve. South Australian Museum Head of Humanities John Carty said the museum wanted to work with the Kaurna people to repatriate their ancestors, and would also be helping to educate the community about what it means to Aboriginal people.

== See also ==
- List of Adelaide suburbs
