= O'Halloran Hill Recreation Park =

Protected area in South Australia

- IUCN category III (natural monument or feature)
- Location within South Australia
- Location: South Australia
- Nearest city: Adelaide city centre
- Coordinates: 35°2′58.55″S 138°32′17.87″E
- Area: 253 ha (630 acres)
- Established: 7 September 1989
- Governing body: Department for Environment and Water
- Website: Official website

O'Halloran Hill Recreation Park is a protected area located about 16 kilometres (9.9 miles) south of the Adelaide city centre in the suburbs of Seaview Downs and O’Halloran Hill. As of December 2021 it is in the process of becoming part of the new Glenthorne National Park–Ityamaiitpinna Yarta.

== History ==
The recreation park was proclaimed under the National Parks and Wildlife Act 1972 in 1989 for "recreation and nature conservation purposes" in respect to parcels of land acquired by the Government of South Australia starting in the 1970s for three purposes - creation of "an open space buffer", provision of "both visual amenity and recreational opportunities for the rapidly growing southern suburbs" and the creation of "a second ring of parklands around Adelaide that would cater for outdoor pursuits, as well as protecting the Hills Face Zone from development".

The new Glenthorne National Park–Ityamaiitpinna Yarta opened to the public in November 2020, and the recreation park is in the process of transitioning to become part of it.

== Description ==
The recreation park is classified as an IUCN Category III protected area.

== See also ==
- List of protected areas in Adelaide
