= City of Marion =

Coordinates: 35.000°S 138.552°E

- Local government area
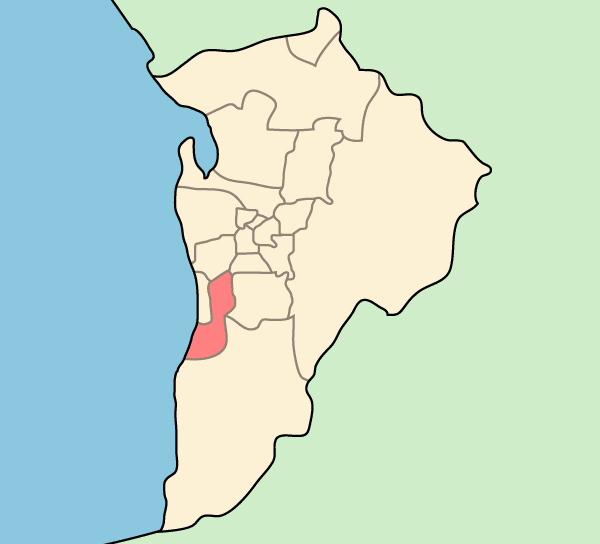

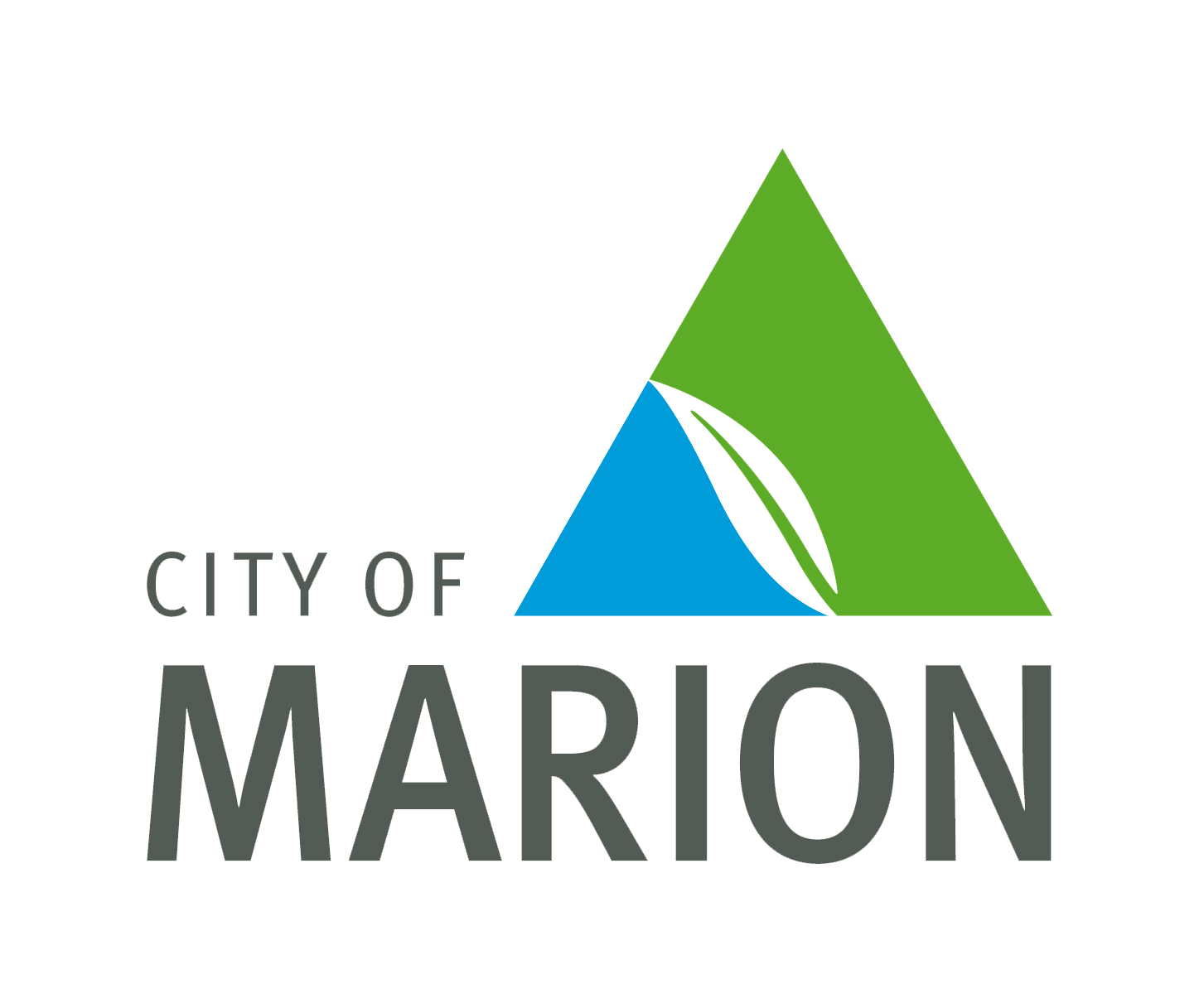
- Flag
- Interactive map of City of Marion
- Country: Australia
- State: South Australia
- Region: Southern Adelaide
- Council seat: Sturt (Town Hall)

Government
  - Mayor: Kris Hanna
  - State electorate: Elder, Gibson, Badcoe, Black, Morphett, Davenport
  - Federal division: Boothby, Kingston

Area
  - Total: 55.5 km^{2} (21.4 sq mi)

Population
  - Total: 94,721 (LGA 2021)
  - Density: 1,706.68/km^{2} (4,420.3/sq mi)
- Website: City of Marion
LGAs around City of Marion
City of Holdfast Bay	City of West Torrens	City of Unley
	City of Marion	City of Mitcham
	City of Onkaparinga	City of Onkaparinga

The City of Marion is a local government area in part of the southern and western suburbs of Adelaide, South Australia. The council offices are in the suburb of Sturt.

== History ==
The District Council of Brighton was established in 1853, centred at the then rural village of Marion (laid out in 1838) 10 kilometres (6.2 mi) south west of Adelaide. The district council was renamed to District Council of Marion in 1886 to distinguish it from the adjacent Town of Brighton, the latter having been detached from the Brighton district council in 1858. In 1944 the district council was gazetted a municipality and thereafter known as the City of Marion, and its first mayor, Frederick Henson Trott, was elected.

=== List of mayors ===
- 1944–1947: Frederick Henson Trott
- 1947–1953: William John White
- 1953–????: Patrick William Tippins
- 1962–????: Ray T. Edwards
- 1964–1972: Ron Keen
- 1972–1978: Livingstone Ralph Grey (Note: Commonly known as Ralph Grey.)
- 1978–1985: E. R. "Ted" Newberry
- 1985–1991: Kevin V. Hodgson
- 1991–2000: Colin Haines
- 2000–2014: Felicity-Ann Lewis
- 2014–present: Kris Hanna

== Council ==
As of September 2022, the council comprises the Mayor and 12 ward councillors across 6 wards, as follows:

Ward	Party	Councillor	Notes
Mayor		Kris Hanna	
Coastal		Ian Crossland	
Coastal		Sarah Luscombe	
Mullawirra		Jason Veliskou	
Mullawirra		Amar Singh	
Southern Hills		Luke Naismith	
Southern Hills		Jana Mates	
Warracowie		Matt Taylor	
Warracowie		Nathan Prior	
Warriparinga		Raelene Telfer	
Warriparinga		Renuka Lama	
Woodlands		Jayne Hoffman	
Woodlands		Joseph Masika	

Kris Hanna is the current mayor of the City of Marion and was sworn in for his third term as Mayor in November 2022. Tony Harrison commenced as the current chief executive on 27 April 2021.

== Electoral history ==
=== 2022 Mayoral election ===
The Local Government elections were held in November 2022. Sitting mayor, Kris Hanna was opposed by Councillor Bruce Hull and Jason Midzi. Mayor Hanna secured the majority vote of 11988, followed by Bruce Hull with 4563 and Jason Midzi with 2695. Five Councillors were re-elected with seven new members sworn in covering all six wards. Amar Singh replaced Kendra Clancy in Mullawirra, Matt Taylor replaced Bruce Hull in Warracowie, Sarah Luscombe replaced Tim Gard in Coastal, Jayne Hoffmann replaced Sasha Mason in Woodlands, who resigned prior to the election, Renuka Lama replaced Luke Hutchinson in Warraparinga and the Southern Hills ward had a change of two Council Members in Jana Mates and Luke Naismith who replaced, Maggie Duncan and Matthew Shilling.

=== 2018 Mayoral election ===
The November 2018 local government election saw the sitting Mayor Kris Hanna go up against Councillor Janet Byram, Councillor Nick Westwood and resident Rob deJonge. Mayor Hanna defeated the challenges and was elected on the first count with 9,094 votes, Byram 3971, deJonge 1,502 and Westwood 1,340. The election also saw eight Councillors re-elected for second, third and fourth terms, along with four new faces. Councillor Joseph Masika was elected in Woodlands Ward and replaced former Councillor Nick Kerry. Councillor Kendra Clancy beat incumbent Councillor Jerome Appleby in Mullawirra Ward. The biggest change was in the Southern Hills ward where both Councillor Maggie Duncan and Councillor Matthew Shilling beat Councillor Nick Kerry who tried to move wards.

=== 2014 Mayoral election ===
The November 2014 local government elections saw a new mayor and seven new councillors elected to serve the City of Marion. Kris Hanna was elected unopposed after Dr Felicity-Ann Lewis decided not to stand in the election. Jerome Appleby, Bruce Hull, Luke Hutchinson, Tim Pfeiffer and Jason Veliskou were re-elected. Seven new councillors were elected; Janet Byram, Ian Crossland, Tim Gard, Nick Kerry, Nathan Prior, Raelene Telfer and Nick Westwood.

=== 2010 Mayoral election ===
The 2010 mayoral election saw sitting Mayor Felicity-ann Lewis go up against Councillor Raelene Telfer. Lewis ran with the campaign slogan "Experienced Leadership", whilst Raelene Telfer went with "A Full-time Mayor for Marion", which tried to tap into concerns that Lewis was too occupied with the Local Government Association of SA. Telfer's campaign failed and Mayor Lewis was returned for another term. Lewis received 7766 votes to Telfer's 6764.

=== 2006 Mayoral election ===
The 2006 mayoral election saw Bruce Hull and Felicity-Ann Lewis go up against each other for the position for a second time. It had been expected that Lewis would not re-contest but she nominated at the eleventh hour. Former councillor Andrew Cole also ran. Bruce Hull failed once again, gaining 7988 votes to Lewis' 8345 after the distribution of Cole's preferences.

=== 2003 Mayoral election ===
At the 2003 Mayoral election Felicity-Ann Lewis was elected unopposed.

== Suburbs ==
The suburbs in the City of Marion are:

- Ascot Park
- Clovelly Park
- Darlington
- Dover Gardens
- Edwardstown
- Glandore
- Glengowrie
- Hallett Cove
- Marino
- Marion
- Mitchell Park
- Morphettville
- O'Halloran Hill
- Oaklands Park
- Park Holme
- Plympton Park
- Seacombe Gardens
- Seacombe Heights
- Seaview Downs
- Sheidow Park
- South Plympton
- Sturt
- Tonsley
- Trott Park
- Warradale

== Key to the City of Marion ==
The following have been awarded the "Key to the City of Marion".

Year	Name
2016	Kyle Chalmers OAM

== See also ==
- List of Adelaide parks and gardens
