= Electoral results for the district of Mitchell (South Australia) =

South Australian district election results

This is a list of electoral results for the Electoral district of Mitchell in South Australian state elections.

== Members for Mitchell ==
Member	Party	Term
Ron Payne	Labor Party	1970–1989
Paul Holloway	Labor Party	1989–1993
Colin Caudell	Liberal Party	1993–1997
Kris Hanna	Labor Party	1997–2003
Kris Hanna	SA Greens	2003–2006
Kris Hanna	Independent	2006–2010
Alan Sibbons	Labor Party	2010–2014
Corey Wingard	Liberal Party	2014–2018

== Election results ==
=== Elections in the 2010s ===
2014 South Australian state election: Mitchell
Party	Candidate	Votes	%	±%
Liberal	Corey Wingard	7,995	36.6	+8.1
Labor	Alan Sibbons	7,309	33.5	−0.7
Independent	Kris Hanna	4,006	18.4	−9.4
Greens	Simon Roberts-Thomson	1,473	6.8	+1.6
Family First	Barbara Bishop	1,034	4.7	+0.4
Total formal votes		21,817	96.8	−0.1
Informal votes		711	3.2	+0.1
Turnout		22,528	93.1	−0.9
Two-party-preferred result
Liberal	Corey Wingard	11,161	51.2	+3.6
Labor	Alan Sibbons	10,656	48.8	−3.6
Liberal gain from Labor		Swing	+3.6	

2010 South Australian state election: Mitchell
Party	Candidate	Votes	%	±%
Labor	Alan Sibbons	7,545	33.9	−9.1
Liberal	Peta McCance	6,386	28.7	+6.4
Independent	Kris Hanna	6,237	28.0	+7.7
Greens	Jeremy Miller	1,125	5.1	+1.3
Family First	Colin Gibson	950	4.3	−1.7
Total formal votes		22,243	96.6	
Informal votes		700	3.4	
Turnout		22,943	94.0	
Two-party-preferred result
Labor	Alan Sibbons	11,597	52.1	+2.7
Liberal	Peta McCance	10,646	47.9	+47.9
Labor gain from Independent		Swing	N/A	

=== Elections in the 2000s ===
2006 South Australian state election: Mitchell
Party	Candidate	Votes	%	±%
Labor	Rosemary Clancy	8,106	41.0	−2.1
Independent	Kris Hanna	4,872	24.6	+24.6
Liberal	Jack Gaffey	4,094	20.7	−17.4
Family First	Meredith Resce	1,062	5.4	+0.7
Greens	Jeffrey Williams	665	3.4	+3.4
Dignity for Disabled	Michele Colmer	438	2.2	+2.2
Democrats	Jenny Scott	344	1.7	−6.4
Independent	Travis Gilbert	185	0.9	+0.9
Total formal votes		19,766	95.4	−1.2
Informal votes		953	4.6	+1.2
Turnout		20,719	93.2	−1.1
Two-party-preferred result
Labor	Rosemary Clancy	12,885	65.2	+10.5
Liberal	Jack Gaffey	6,881	34.8	−10.5
Two-candidate-preferred result
Independent	Kris Hanna	9,997	50.6	+50.6
Labor	Rosemary Clancy	9,769	49.4	−5.3
Independent gain from Labor		Swing	N/A	

2002 South Australian state election: Mitchell
Party	Candidate	Votes	%	±%
Labor	Kris Hanna	8,502	43.1	+5.4
Liberal	Hugh Martin	7,520	38.1	−2.1
Democrats	Bridgid Medder	1,595	8.1	−8.9
Family First	Wayne Bishop	922	4.7	+4.7
Independent	Deb Guildner	691	3.5	+3.5
One Nation	Daniel Piechnick	393	2.0	+2.0
Independent	Josephine Dowsett	122	0.6	+0.6
Total formal votes		19,745	96.6	
Informal votes		692	3.4	
Turnout		20,437	94.3	
Two-party-preferred result
Labor	Kris Hanna	10,794	54.7	+4.1
Liberal	Hugh Martin	8,951	45.3	−4.1
Labor hold		Swing	+4.1	

=== Elections in the 1990s ===
1997 South Australian state election: Mitchell
Party	Candidate	Votes	%	±%
Liberal	Colin Caudell	7,673	40.2	−11.7
Labor	Kris Hanna	7,411	38.8	+6.3
Democrats	Lawrence Wapnah	3,074	16.1	+6.8
Independent	Daniel Elsley	936	4.9	+4.9
Total formal votes		19,094	96.4	−0.1
Informal votes		703	3.6	+0.1
Turnout		19,797	93.4	
Two-party-preferred result
Labor	Kris Hanna	9,710	50.9	+10.3
Liberal	Colin Caudell	9,384	49.1	−10.3
Labor gain from Liberal		Swing	+10.3	

1993 South Australian state election: Mitchell
Party	Candidate	Votes	%	±%
Liberal	Colin Caudell	9,905	51.8	+12.4
Labor	Paul Acfield	6,207	32.4	−14.5
Democrats	Elizabeth Williams	1,793	9.4	−1.3
Grey Power	John Darbishire	599	3.1	+3.1
Independent	Vanessa Sutch	337	1.8	+1.8
Natural Law	Andrew Scott	296	1.5	+1.5
Total formal votes		19,137	96.5	−0.5
Informal votes		691	3.5	+0.5
Turnout		19,828	94.5	
Two-party-preferred result
Liberal	Colin Caudell	11,365	59.4	+13.0
Labor	Paul Acfield	7,772	40.6	−13.0
Liberal gain from Labor		Swing	+13.0	

=== Elections in the 1980s ===
1989 South Australian state election: Mitchell
Party	Candidate	Votes	%	±%
Labor	Paul Holloway	8,187	47.9	−12.9
Liberal	Darryl Parslow	6,695	39.2	+4.8
Democrats	Sue Ann Carver	2,196	12.9	+8.1
Total formal votes		17,078	97.2	+0.8
Informal votes		492	2.8	−0.8
Turnout		17,570	94.6	+0.6
Two-party-preferred result
Labor	Paul Holloway	9,279	54.3	−9.2
Liberal	Darryl Parslow	7,799	45.7	+9.2
Labor hold		Swing	−9.2	

1985 South Australian state election: Mitchell
Party	Candidate	Votes	%	±%
Labor	Ron Payne	10,408	60.8	+3.8
Liberal	Mark Hanckel	5,876	34.4	−2.6
Democrats	Peter Mann	821	4.8	−1.2
Total formal votes		17,105	96.4	
Informal votes		636	3.6	
Turnout		17,741	94.0	
Two-party-preferred result
Labor	Ron Payne	10,864	63.5	+3.5
Liberal	Mark Hanckel	6,241	36.5	−3.5
Labor hold		Swing	+3.5	

1982 South Australian state election: Mitchell
Party	Candidate	Votes	%	±%
Labor	Ron Payne	8,971	57.6	+7.8
Liberal	David Phelps	5,574	35.8	−3.2
Democrats	Kevin Whitby	1,026	6.6	−4.6
Total formal votes		15,571	94.7	−1.5
Informal votes		877	5.3	+1.5
Turnout		16,448	92.9	−0.4
Two-party-preferred result
Labor	Ron Payne	9,448	60.7	+6.4
Liberal	David Phelps	6,123	39.3	−6.4
Labor hold		Swing	+6.4	

=== Elections in the 1970s ===
1979 South Australian state election: Mitchell
Party	Candidate	Votes	%	±%
Labor	Ron Payne	7,624	49.8	−6.3
Liberal	Thomas Wallace	5,975	39.0	+7.4
Democrats	Kevin Whitby	1,721	11.2	+1.4
Total formal votes		15,320	96.2	−1.6
Informal votes		610	3.8	+1.6
Turnout		15,930	93.3	−0.2
Two-party-preferred result
Labor	Ron Payne	8,321	54.3	−7.1
Liberal	Thomas Wallace	6,999	45.7	+7.1
Labor hold		Swing	−7.1	

1977 South Australian state election: Mitchell
Party	Candidate	Votes	%	±%
Labor	Ron Payne	8,952	56.1	+1.9
Liberal	June Schaeffer	5,046	31.6	+7.6
Democrats	Kevin Whitby	1,566	9.8	+9.8
Independent	Peter Amor	250	1.6	+1.6
Workers	John Pocius	137	0.9	+0.9
Total formal votes		15,951	97.8	
Informal votes		351	2.2	
Turnout		16,302	93.5	
Two-party-preferred result
Labor	Ron Payne	9,794	61.4	+1.6
Liberal	June Schaeffer	6,157	38.6	−1.6
Labor hold		Swing	+1.6	

1975 South Australian state election: Mitchell
Party	Candidate	Votes	%	±%
Labor	Ron Payne	8,765	54.2	−6.8
Liberal	Robert Alcock	3,883	24.9	−14.1
Liberal Movement	Peter Amor	3,537	21.9	+21.9
Total formal votes		16,185	95.8	−1.0
Informal votes		701	4.2	+1.0
Turnout		16,886	94.4	−0.1
Two-party-preferred result
Labor	Ron Payne	9,112	56.3	−4.7
Liberal	Robert Alcock	7,013	43.7	+4.7
Labor hold		Swing	−4.7	

1973 South Australian state election: Mitchell
Party	Candidate	Votes	%	±%
Labor	Ron Payne	9,472	61.0	+1.7
Liberal and Country	Peter Daniels	6,059	39.0	−1.7
Total formal votes		15,531	96.8	−1.5
Informal votes		508	3.2	+1.5
Turnout		16,039	94.5	−1.0
Labor hold		Swing	+1.7	

1970 South Australian state election: Mitchell
Party	Candidate	Votes	%	±%
Labor	Ron Payne	8,785	59.3	
Liberal and Country	Stephen Baker	6,020	40.7	
Total formal votes		14,805	98.3	
Informal votes		251	1.7	
Turnout		15,056	95.5	
Labor hold		Swing		
