= Electoral results for the district of Gibson =

This is a list of electoral results for the electoral district of Gibson in South Australian state elections.

== Members for Gibson ==
Member	Party	Term
Corey Wingard	Liberal	2018–2022
Sarah Andrews	Labor	2022–present

== Election results ==
=== Elections in the 2020s ===
==== 2026 ====
2026 South Australian state election: Gibson
Party	Candidate	Votes	%	±%
Labor	Sarah Andrews	11,329	46.0	+6.4
Liberal	Jane Fleming	5,757	23.4	−19.2
One Nation	Zoran Ananijev	3,625	14.7	+14.7
Greens	Mike Trewartha	3,092	12.5	+1.4
Animal Justice	Bin Liu	353	1.4	+1.4
Family First	Darryl Easther	305	1.2	−2.5
Australian Family	Glenn O'Rourke	116	0.5	+0.5
Fair Go	John Lutman	75	0.3	+0.3
Total formal votes		24,652	96.9	−0.7
Informal votes		783	3.1	+0.7
Turnout		25,435	88.8	−0.2
Two-candidate-preferred result
Labor	Sarah Andrews	15,706	63.7	+11.2
Liberal	Jane Fleming	8,953	36.3	−11.2
Labor hold		Swing	+11.2	

==== 2022 ====
2022 South Australian state election: Gibson
Party	Candidate	Votes	%	±%
Liberal	Corey Wingard	10,431	42.6	−5.4
Labor	Sarah Andrews	9,701	39.6	+14.3
Greens	Diane Atkinson	2,712	11.1	+5.5
Family First	Fiona Leslie	913	3.7	+3.7
Independent	Jaison Midzi	746	3.0	+3.0
Total formal votes		24,503	97.6	
Informal votes		607	2.4	
Turnout		25,110	89.0	
Two-party-preferred result
Labor	Sarah Andrews	12,867	52.5	+12.5
Liberal	Corey Wingard	11,636	47.5	−12.5
Labor gain from Liberal		Swing	+12.5	

Distribution of preferences: Gibson
Party	Candidate	Votes	Round 1		Round 2		Round 3	
Party	Candidate	Votes	Dist.	Total	Dist.	Total	Dist.	Total
Quota (50% + 1)		12,252						
Liberal	Corey Wingard	10,431	+115	10,546	+455	11,001	+635	11,636
Labor	Sarah Andrews	9,701	+133	9,834	+357	10,191	+2,676	12,867
Greens	Diane Atkinson	2,712	+229	2,941	+370	3,311	Excluded	
Family First	Fiona Leslie	913	+269	1,182	Excluded			
Independent	Jaison Midzi	746	Excluded					

=== Elections in the 2010s ===
==== 2018 ====
2018 South Australian state election: Gibson
Party	Candidate	Votes	%	±%
Liberal	Corey Wingard	10,965	48.1	+2.4
Labor	Matthew Carey	5,843	25.6	−9.1
SA-Best	Kris Hanna	4,107	18.0	+18.0
Greens	Gwydion Rozitisolds	1,326	5.8	−3.0
Dignity	Garry Connor	570	2.5	+1.5
Total formal votes		22,811	96.8	−0.6
Informal votes		762	3.2	+0.6
Turnout		23,573	91.3	+3.1
Two-party-preferred result
Liberal	Corey Wingard	13,537	59.3	+5.6
Labor	Matthew Carey	9,274	40.7	−5.6
Liberal hold		Swing	+5.6	
