= Electoral district of Mitchell (South Australia) =

Former state electoral district of South Australia

Mitchell South Australia—House of Assembly
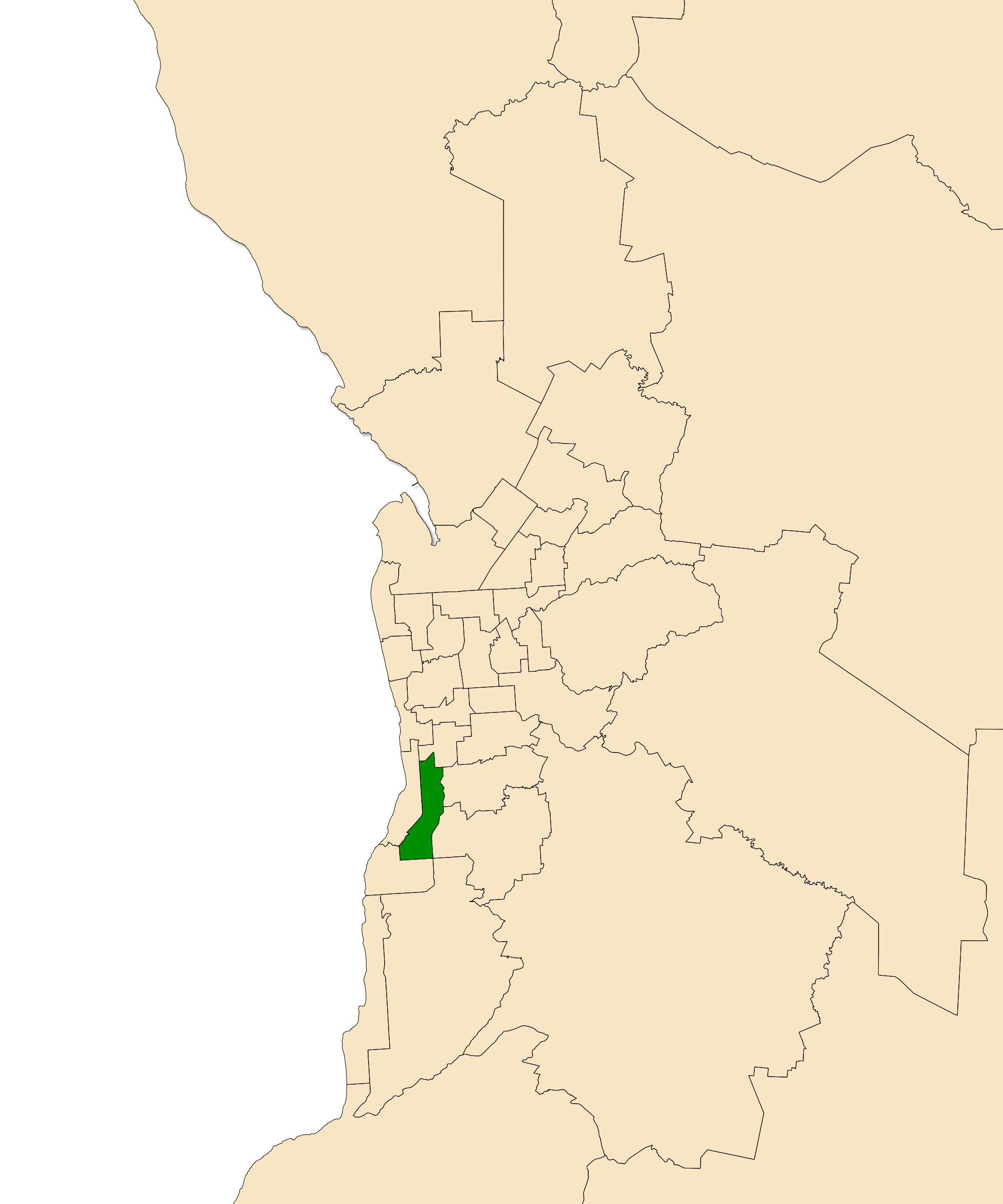
- Electoral district of Mitchell (green) in the Greater Adelaide area
- State: South Australia
- Created: 1970
- Abolished: 2018
- Namesake: Sir William Mitchell
- Electors: 24,185 (2014)
- Area: 26.8 km^{2} (10.3 sq mi)
- Demographic: Metropolitan
- Coordinates: 35°3′16″S 138°32′4″E

Mitchell is a former electoral district of the House of Assembly in the state of South Australia. It was first created in the redistribution of 1969, taking effect at the 1970 election. Mitchell was replaced by Black at the 2018 election, resulting from the 2016 electoral redistribution.

Mitchell was named after philosopher Sir William Mitchell.

Mitchell was located in inner-south western Adelaide, and covered 26.8 square kilometres (10.3 sq mi) and encompassed the suburbs of Dover Gardens, Old Reynella, Reynella, Seacombe Gardens, Seacombe Heights, Seaview Downs, Sheidow Park, Sturt and Trott Park and parts of Darlington, O'Halloran Hill, Oaklands Park and Warradale. The suburbs contained within the seat in 2010 were completely different as recently as 1989. The 1989 seat centred on Park Holme, north-east of the current incarnation of Mitchell, where much of the seat of Elder is. The 1989 boundary bordered the 2010 boundary in the south-west and north-east respectively.

Mitchell tended to be a marginal Labor-held seat. While Colin Caudell succeeded in winning the seat for the Liberal Party for the first time at the 1993 election, he was narrowly defeated by Kris Hanna at the 1997 election. Hanna markedly increased his majority at the 2002 election, but defected to the SA Greens in 2003. He subsequently left the Greens in February 2006, and won his seat at the 2006 election narrowly as an independent candidate on a 50.6 two-candidate vote, though Labor got a 65.2 percent two-party vote against the Liberals. Hanna failed in his attempts to retain the seat at the 2010 election, losing to Labor candidate Alan Sibbons. Hanna unsuccessfully contested the seat at the 2014 election. Liberal Corey Wingard won the seat with a 51.2 percent two-party vote which made it the most marginal seat in parliament. It was the first time Labor was in government with the Liberals winning Mitchell.

At the 2018 state election, Wingard chose to contest the seat of Gibson, and was successful; and the seat of Black was won by David Speirs, the former member for Bright; both members of the Liberal Party.

== Members for Mitchell ==
Member	Party	Term
Ron Payne	Labor	1970–1989
Paul Holloway	Labor	1989–1993
Colin Caudell	Liberal	1993–1997
Kris Hanna	Labor	1997–2003
Kris Hanna	Greens	2003–2006
Kris Hanna	Independent	2006–2010
Alan Sibbons	Labor	2010–2014
Corey Wingard	Liberal	2014–2018

== Election results ==
2014 South Australian state election: Mitchell
Party	Candidate	Votes	%	±%
Liberal	Corey Wingard	7,995	36.6	+8.1
Labor	Alan Sibbons	7,309	33.5	−0.7
Independent	Kris Hanna	4,006	18.4	−9.4
Greens	Simon Roberts-Thomson	1,473	6.8	+1.6
Family First	Barbara Bishop	1,034	4.7	+0.4
Total formal votes		21,817	96.8	−0.1
Informal votes		711	3.2	+0.1
Turnout		22,528	93.1	−0.9
Two-party-preferred result
Liberal	Corey Wingard	11,161	51.2	+3.6
Labor	Alan Sibbons	10,656	48.8	−3.6
Liberal gain from Labor		Swing	+3.6	
