= Oaklands railway station =

Railway station in Adelaide, South Australia

Coordinates: 35°00′36″S 138°32′25″E

Oaklands
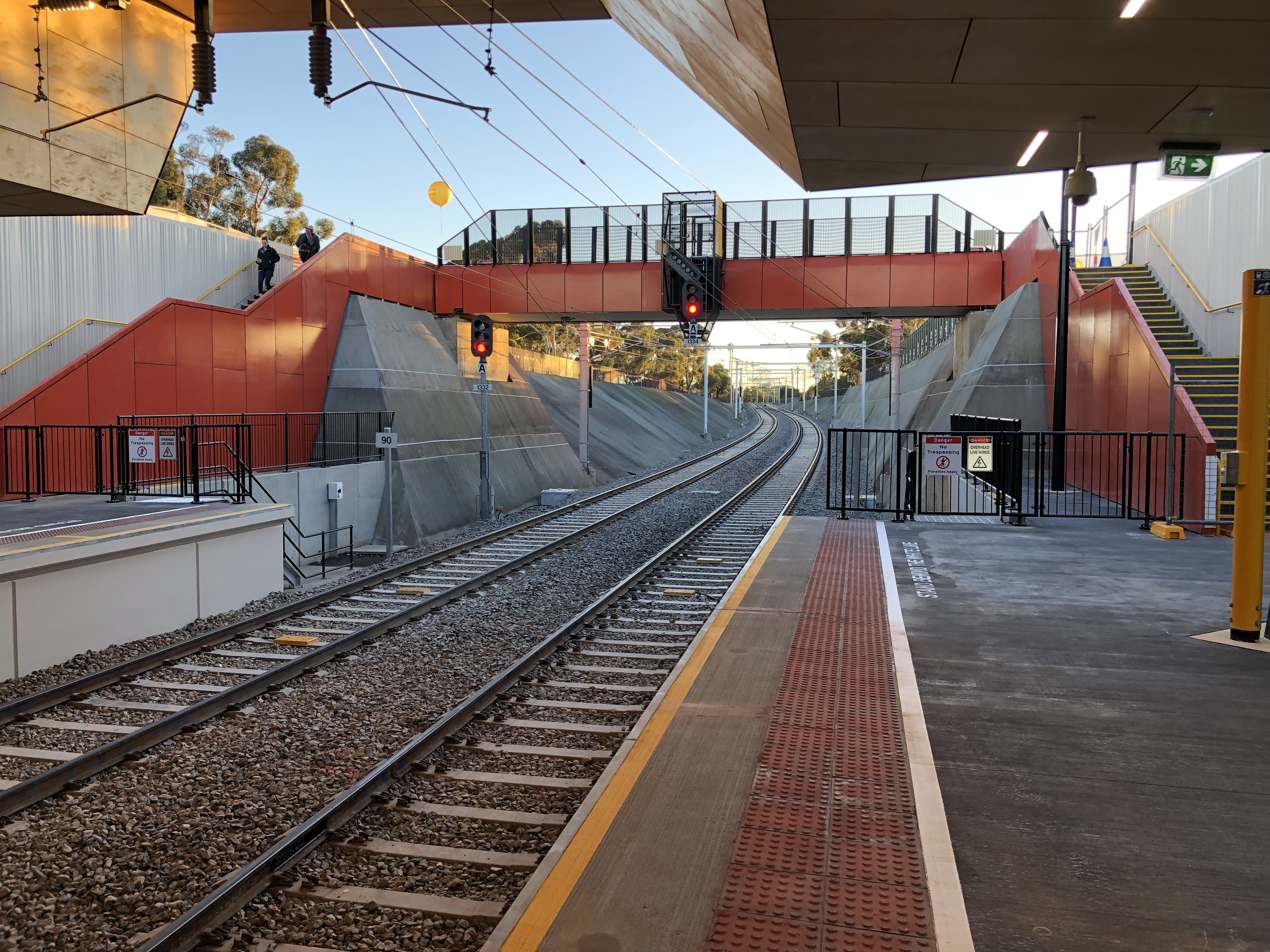
- North-east bound view from Platform 2, showing the eastern side footbridge, May 2019

General information
- Location: Murray Terrace, Oaklands Park
- Owner: Department for Infrastructure & Transport
- Operator: Adelaide Metro
- Line: Seaford
- Distance: 13 km from Adelaide
- Platforms: 2
- Tracks: 2
- Bus routes: J7, J7M, J8, 241, 248, 248F, 263, 300, 300G, 300H, 300J, 300M, 300U, 966, 980, 981, 982, 991

Construction
- Structure type: Ground

Other information
- Station code: 16550

History
- Opened: 1913
- Rebuilt: 10 June 2008 (at-grade); 6 May 2019 (grade separated)

Services
Preceding station	Adelaide Metro	Following station
Marion towards Adelaide	Seaford line	Warradale towards Seaford
Location

Oaklands railway station is located on the Seaford railway line in Adelaide, South Australia. It is in the south-western suburb of Oaklands Park, 13 kilometres from Adelaide station.

== History ==
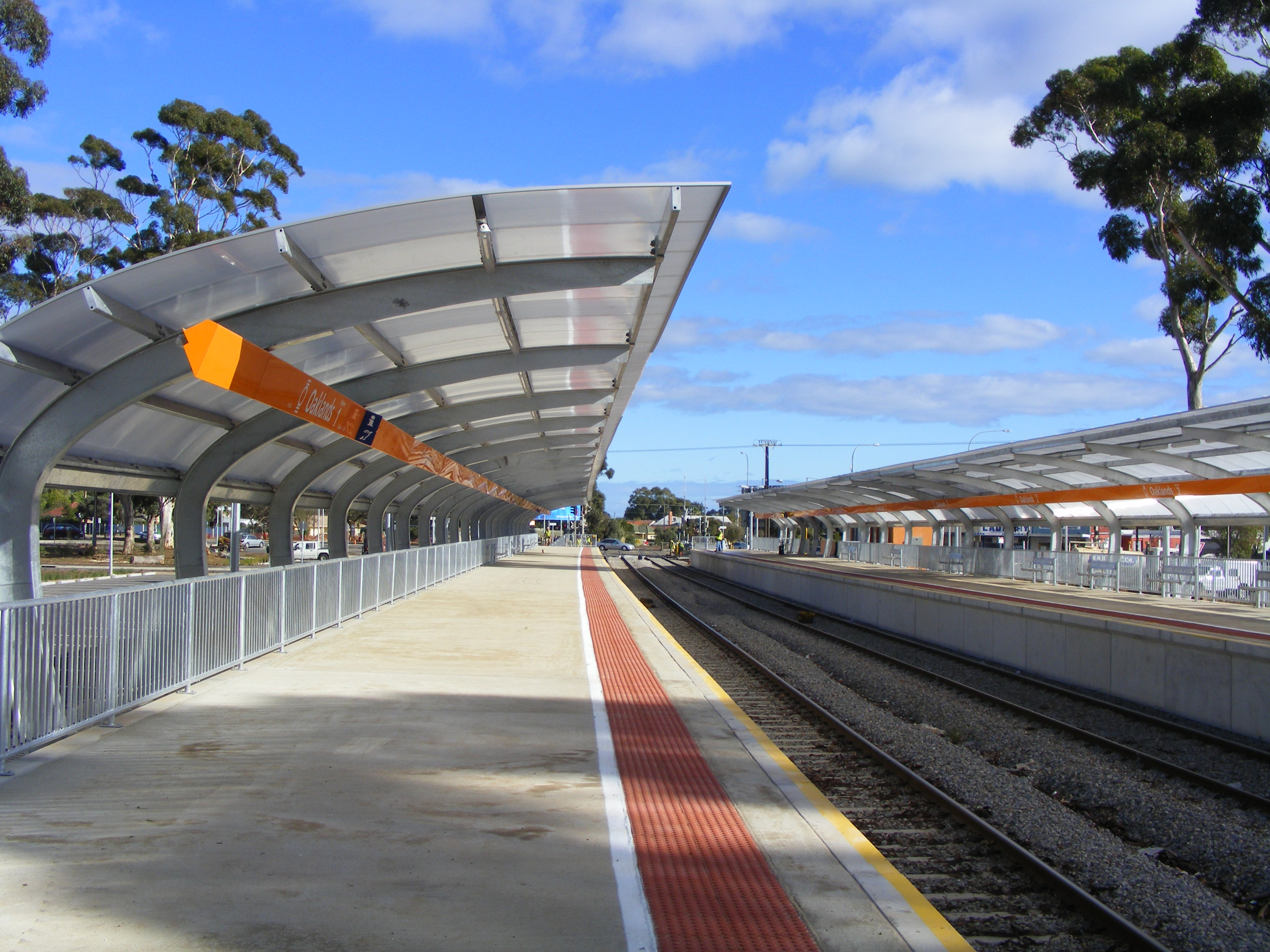
At-grade station open 2008–2019

Oaklands station was opened in 1913, the land having been sold to the State Government by T. C. Tait on the proviso that it be named after his once-extensive property. Until the early 1950s the Ascot Park and Oaklands stations serviced Marion with a single rail track. In 1953, the line was duplicated as far as Oaklands, and as part of that work a new station was constructed at Marion. The duplication resulted in the station being redeveloped into a single island platform between the two tracks of the rail line.

On 6 June 2008, the island platform and asbestos shelter was closed and demolished. A new station, opened on 10 June 2008, had been constructed immediately to the southwest of the original station's location between Selway Street and Kearnes Road, bringing it significantly closer to Diagonal Road. The timetable was also modified so that all trains now stop at the station.

=== Grade separation ===
In 2011-2012, the state government undertook a planning study into a grade separation project to eliminate the level crossing south of the station by building an underpass beneath the railway line for Diagonal Road. No funding was provided at that time. Work began in 2018 to lower the railway line under the road instead. The contract to design and build the new crossing was awarded on 16 January 2018 to the Public Transport Projects Alliance, a joint venture of McConnell Dowell, Mott MacDonald and Arup Group. During construction in late 2018, the government proposed a renaming of the station to Marion Centre to better reflect its location near the Westfield Marion Shopping Centre, Marion Cultural Centre and the State Aquatic Centre. However, the proposed renaming did not materialise.

The existing Oaklands station was permanently closed on 13 April 2019 and demolished as works commenced to realign the tracks to the newly-constructed underpass; the Seaford Line was also temporarily closed between Brighton and Adelaide to allow the electric catenary for the trains to be shut off for the final works. The new grade separated station features ramps and stairs down to platform level and has public toilet facilities at street level. The line was reopened on 6 May 2019 and trains commenced servicing the new station the same day.

== Services by platform ==
Platform	Destination/s
1	Seaford
2	Adelaide
