= Hove, South Australia =

Hove Adelaide, South Australia
- Coordinates: 35.009°S 138.522°E
- Population: 3,189 (SAL 2021)
- Postcode(s): 5048
- LGA(s): City of Holdfast Bay
- State electorate(s): Gibson
- Federal division(s): Boothby
Suburbs around Hove:
Gulf St Vincent	North Brighton
Gulf St Vincent	Hove	Warradale
Gulf St Vincent	Brighton

Hove is a coastal suburb of Adelaide, South Australia. It is situated north of Brighton, west of Warradale, and south of North Brighton. Running along the west of the suburb is the Esplanade, a street with numerous townhouses with views of the Gulf St Vincent. The suburb is bisected by its major thoroughfare, Brighton Road. Property prices are generally higher on the coastal side of Brighton Road.

== Public transport ==
The Seaford railway line serves most of the suburb's public transport needs with the Hove railway station situated just off Brighton Road. The 262, 263, and 265 bus routes which run from the Adelaide CBD to Westfield Marion via Glenelg also serve the suburb.

== Landmarks ==
Major landmarks within the suburb include Brighton Road Oval, Marymount College, and Townsend House, an iconic building that provides services for the hearing and sight impaired. The oldest landmark in Hove is the Brighton Town Hall that was constructed in 1869. It was the civic centre for 90 years and the birthplace of local government. It still stands at the Hove rail crossing at 388 Brighton Road.

== Politics ==
The suburb is split between the Brighton and Seacliff wards of the City of Holdfast Bay local government council. The suburb is represented by Labor member Sarah Andrews in the South Australian Parliament for the electorate of Gibson. Federally, the suburb is located within the electorate of Boothby and is represented by Labor member Louise Miller-Frost.
