= Electoral results for the district of Mitchell =

Electoral results for the district of Mitchell may refer to:

- Electoral results for the district of Mitchell (South Australia)
- Electoral results for the district of Mitchell (Western Australia)
