= Marion, South Australia =

Marion
- Suburb
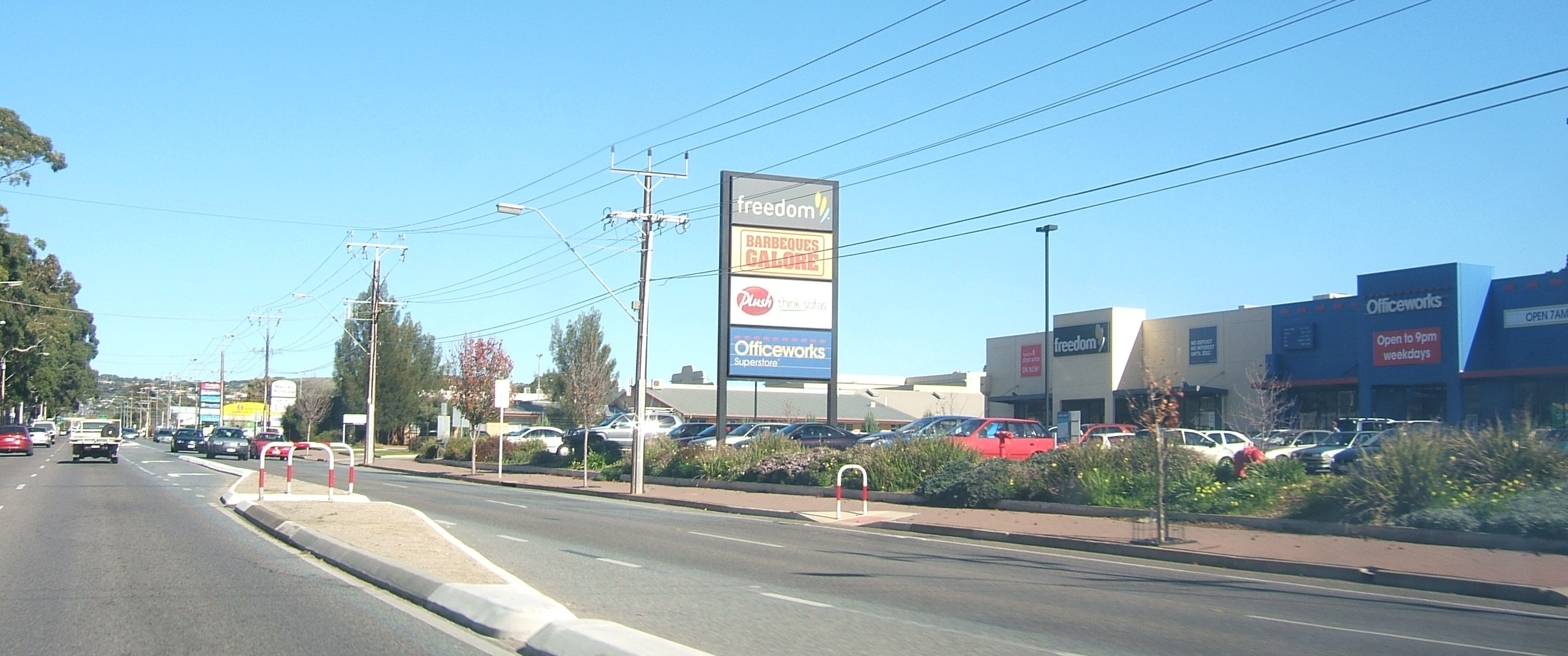
- Retail outlets on Marion Road

- Country: Australia
- State: South Australia
- City: Adelaide
- LGA: City of Marion
- Location: 10 km (6.2 mi) from Adelaide city centre
- Established: 1838

Government
  - State electorate: Gibson
  - Federal division: Boothby

Population
  - Total: 4,101 (SAL 2021)
- Postcode: 5043
Suburbs around Marion
Morphettville	Park Holme	Ascot Park
Oaklands Park	Marion	Mitchell Park
Seacombe Gardens	Sturt	Bedford Park

Marion is a suburb in the City of Marion, around 10 kilometres (6.2 mi) south-west of the city centre of Adelaide, the capital of South Australia. Founded as a rural village in 1838 on the banks of the Sturt River, Marion was found to have rich soil and the population expanded rapidly. Colonel William Light laid out the plan for the village, as he had done with the City of Adelaide itself.

Marion is bordered on the north by Oaklands Road, on the east by Marion Road, on the south by Sturt Road and on the west by a roughly straight line from Finniss Street in the south to The Parade.

== History ==
The township of Marion was laid out by William Light and B. T. Finniss in 1838, and was (mis)named for Marianne Fisher (1827–1927), daughter of the Resident Commissioner, James Hurtle Fisher. Vegetables, stone fruits, almonds and grapes were all produced in Marion. Richard Hamilton started the first vineyard in 1838 and his family continues its wine making tradition to this day. By the late 19th century Marion was also home to a number of industries such as a mining and brick making. However, the population at this time was still very small – around 350 people. Gradually the Adelaide sprawl crept up to Marion, and by the 1950s the suburb was well and truly enveloped.

Much of the development was "austerity housing", basic 3- and 4-bedroom dwellings, unfinished and unfurnished, on bare quarter-acre (1000 m^{2}m) blocks. Walls were of cavity construction: variously double brick or brick-Mount Gambier stone and roofs tiled, either cement or terracotta. The properties built for the South Australian Housing Trust and rented or sold at modest cost to working families, many being migrants from overseas or country areas who were attracted to Adelaide by newly developed industries. The tenants would then finish the house in their own time by painting, adding floor coverings and fitting curtains. Many would then add insulation, a garage, sheds, gardens, lawns, trees and so forth.
Many of these places remain, but are being overtaken by "infill" housing: two or three residences where there once was one.

== Parkland ==
Marion is home to a number of parks and reserves. The large sporting complex off Sturt Road contains ovals and a basketball stadium. There are also parks on Norfolk Road, Tilley Crescent, Nicholas Road, Oakleigh Road, George Street and Alison Avenue.

Marion also shares the Oaklands Reserve with Oaklands Park. The City of Marion Swimming Centre is situated adjacent to the suburb of Marion, in Park Holme.

The Sturt River Linear Park is a trail which follows the Sturt River through the south-western metropolitan area from Marion to Glenelg.

== Community facilities ==
The large co-educational private school, Westminster, is situated on Alison Avenue near the railway line. It caters to all grades from Reception to Year 12, and caters to boarders.

Marion High School, situated on York Avenue, Clovelly Park, served the youth of the area for over forty years until its closure in 1996. The area has now been redeveloped primarily for housing, with just the school hall remaining; named Cosgrove Hall after a long-running headmaster of the school.

Churches of various denominations are located Marion.

The Marion Returned and Services League of Australia Club is located on Norfolk Road.

There is a bowling clubs in the suburb of Marion, located on Sturt Road adjacent to Sturt Oval.

In April 2011 South Australian Premier Mike Rann opened the South Australia Aquatic and Leisure Centre on Morphett Road in Oaklands Park, the most advanced swimming and diving facilities in Australia. He was joined at the opening by Marion Mayor Felicity-Ann Lewis. Lewis and Rann had championed the project for some years to enable Olympic standard aquatic sports to occur in South Australia.

== Governance ==
It is part of the City of Marion. The council offices for the whole city are located in nearby Sturt. Marion is split between the state electorates of Elder and Mitchell and is situated in the Federal Division of Boothby.

== Transport ==
There is a railway station in Marion between Minchinbury Terrace and Fairne Terrace, which connects to Adelaide's centre to the north and Noarlunga to the south.

== See also ==
- List of Adelaide suburbs
