= Somerton Park, South Australia =

Somerton Park
- Suburb
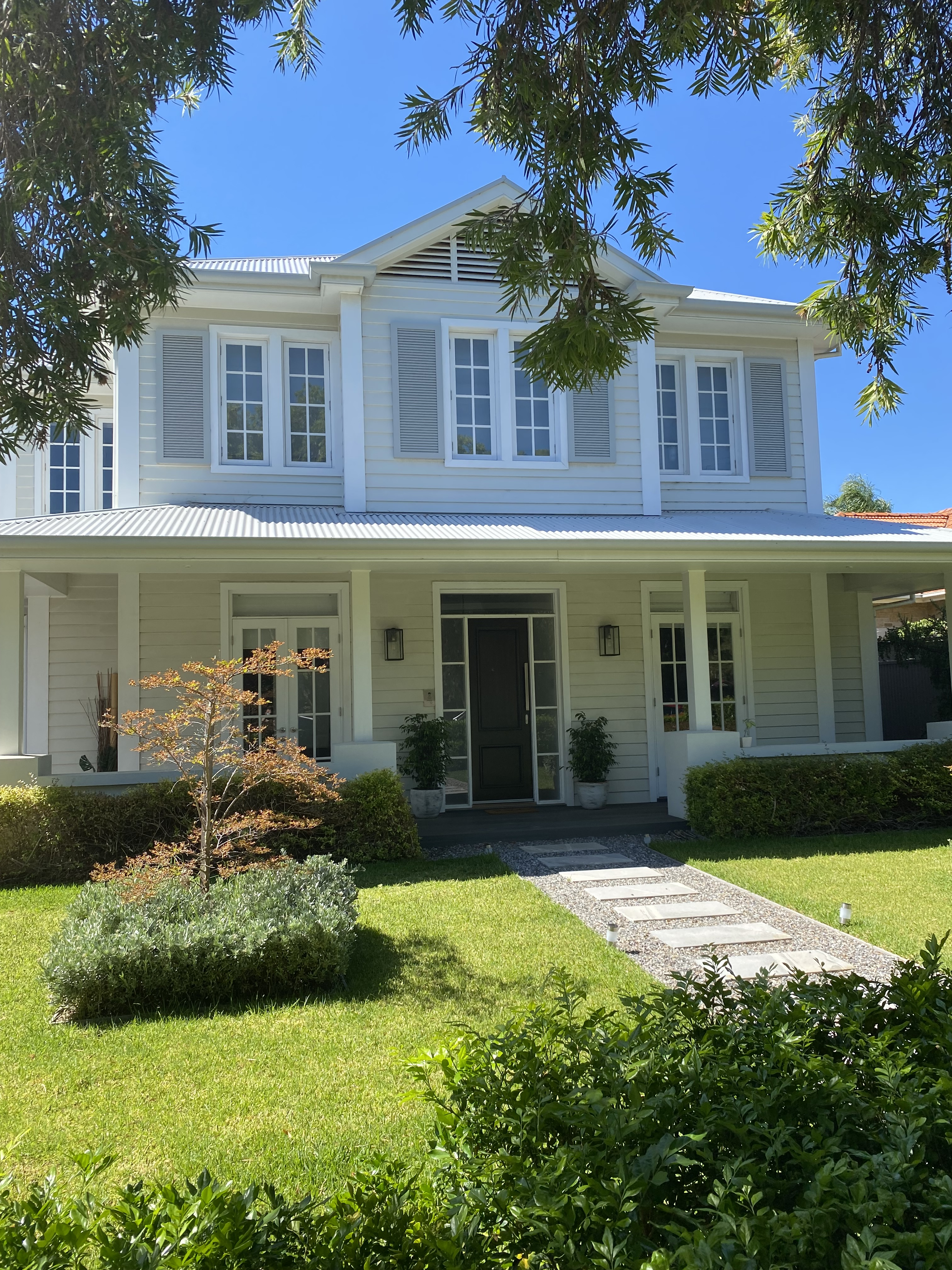
- House in Somerton Park

- Coordinates: 34°59′43″S 138°31′17″E
- Country: Australia
- State: South Australia
- City: Adelaide
- LGA: City of Holdfast Bay
- Location: 12 km (7.5 mi) from Adelaide

Government
  - State electorates: Gibson; Morphett
  - Federal division: Boothby

Population
  - Total: 5,811 (SAL 2021)
- Postcode: 5044
Suburbs around Somerton Park
	Glenelg South	Morphettville
Gulf St Vincent	Somerton Park	Warradale
	North Brighton	Warradale

Somerton Park is a seaside suburb of Adelaide in South Australia. The mainly residential suburb is home to the Somerton Park Beach, Sacred Heart College and North Brighton Cemetery.

== History ==
Somerton Park Post Office opened on 1 July 1947 and closed in 1988.

=== Seaforth ===
In 1921, the Seaforth Convalescent Home, a two-storey building surrounded by four acres of land situated not far from the beach (at 20 Tarlton Street), was opened by the South Australian Government. The convalescent home provided short-term accommodation for children recuperating from illness or hospitalisation, as well as being used as a holiday home for children who had been placed in service. As time went by, teachers were appointed, and by the 1930s around 30 to 50 children, mainly girls, lived at the home. Numbers grew to more than 60 in the mid-1940s, and additional dormitories and staff quarters were built. In 1946, the institution was renamed Seaforth Home.

From 1946 to 1976, the home was named the Seaforth Home and run by the government. It accommodated up to 100 boys and girls up to the age of six and girls up to the age of 18, as well as some children with disabilities, most who were deemed to be destitute or neglected. A few had minor behavioural problems, but they were not offenders. The home became very full in the 1950s, and in order to ease the overcrowding, boys under the age of six who were ready for primary school were moved to the Glandore Industrial School. Singer-songwriter Ruby Hunter spent some time in the home.

By 1973, the three were only 30 children in the home, most with disabilities, and the accommodation was split into smaller units. The home close in 1975, to be replaced by five independent cottage residences on the same site.

The home was sometimes referred to as Seaforth Children's Home. During the 2004–2008 Children in State Care Commission of Inquiry (the Mullighan Inquiry), several women gave evidence about abuse at both Seaforth Convalescent Home and Seaforth Home, and a number of deaths were also investigated.

== Notable residents ==
- Phil Walsh (1960–2015), coach of Adelaide Football Club, who was killed by his son, who had undiagnosed schizophrenia at the time.
- The Beaumont children (b. 1956, 1958, 1961), who disappeared at the nearby Glenelg beach in 1966, lived at 109 Harding Street in Somerton Park.
- The corpse of an unidentified man, nicknamed the Somerton Man, was first found here in the 1940s.

== See also ==
- Somerton Man, a man found dead on Somerton Park beach in 1948, identified as Carl "Charles" Webb in 2022.
