= Hove railway station, Adelaide =

Railway station in Adelaide, South Australia

Hove
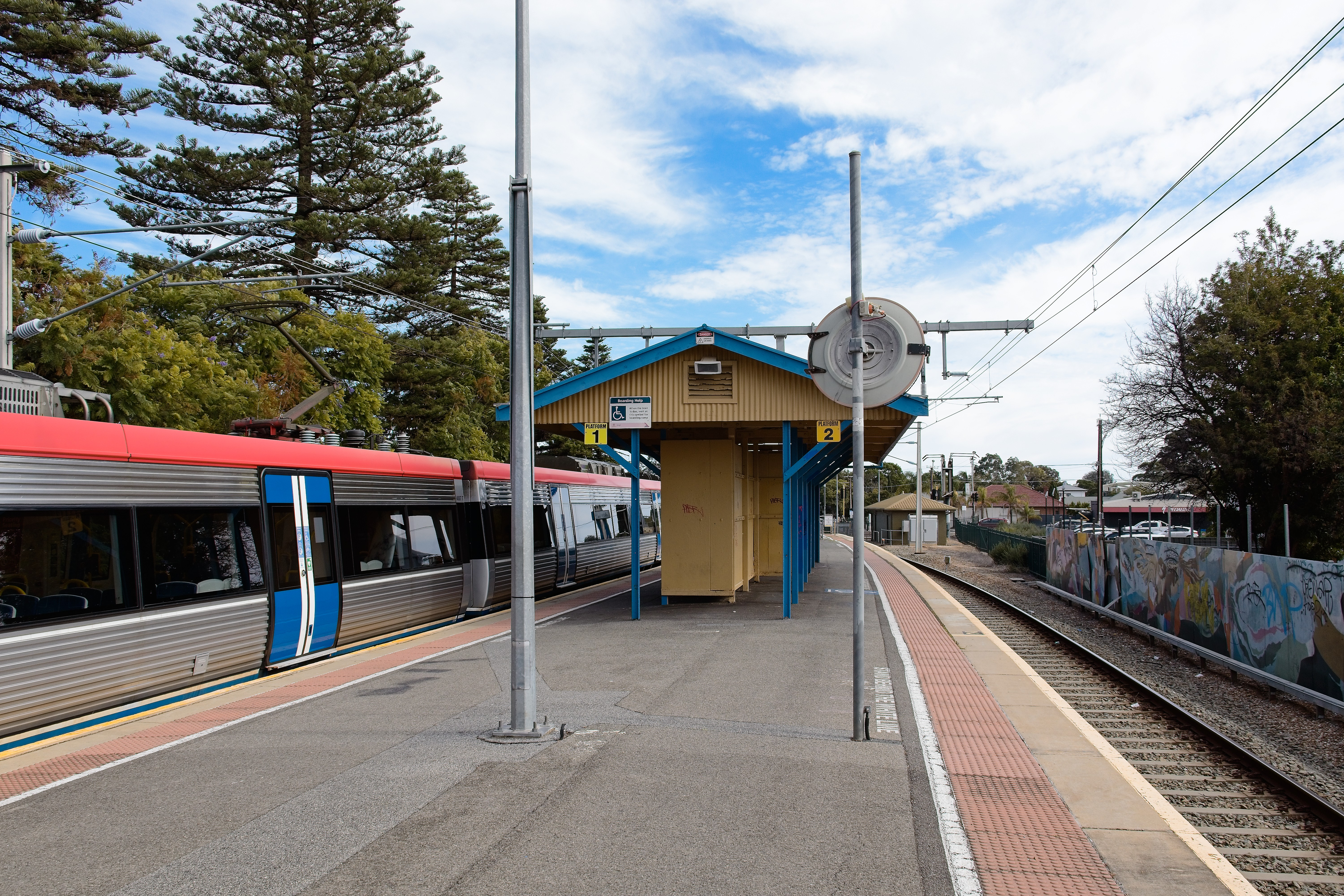
- Westbound view from Platform 2, April 2026

General information
- Location: Addison Road, Hove
- Coordinates: 35°00′44″S 138°31′25″E
- Owner: Department for Infrastructure & Transport
- Operator: Adelaide Metro
- Line: Seaford
- Distance: 14.6 km from Adelaide
- Platforms: 2
- Tracks: 2
- Bus routes: 262 & 265 to City & Westfield Marion

Construction
- Structure type: Ground
- Parking: Yes
- Cycle facilities: Yes

History
- Opened: 1914

Services
Preceding station	Adelaide Metro	Following station
Warradale towards Adelaide	Seaford line	Brighton towards Seaford
Location

Hove railway station is located on the Seaford line. Situated in the south-western Adelaide suburb of Hove, it is 14.6 kilometres from Adelaide station.

== History ==
Hove was opened on 12 January 1914, and originally as North Brighton Station. In April 1914, not long after opening, the station was renamed Middle Brighton Station. Later in 1914, an electric light was installed to replace the previous oil lamp. As it was an unstaffed station at the time, the light was switched on by a guard on the passing train at sundown, and off by the guard on the last train for the night. A ticket office was added to the platform in mid-1915. In 1920, the Railways Commissioner suggested the station should be renamed to Tingara Station, however the Brighton Council preferred Hove. The station was officially renamed Hove in June 1920.

Until the 1990s, Hove station had a ticket office, toilets and an underground pedestrian tunnel, but heavy graffiti and vandalism led to these facilities being closed and demolished. Like many stations on the Adelaide Metro network, the tunnel was replaced with a level pedestrian crossing.

Funding for a grade separation of Brighton Road and the Seaford line was announced in the 2019/2020 state budget, with a combined commitment of $171 million in funding from the Federal and State governments. Design options were released in January 2021, however the project was later cancelled in June 2021 with the 2021/2022 state budget citing cost overruns and local opposition to the project.

== Services by platform ==
Platform	Destination/s
1	Seaford
2	Adelaide
