= Warradale railway station =

Railway station in Adelaide, South Australia

Warradale
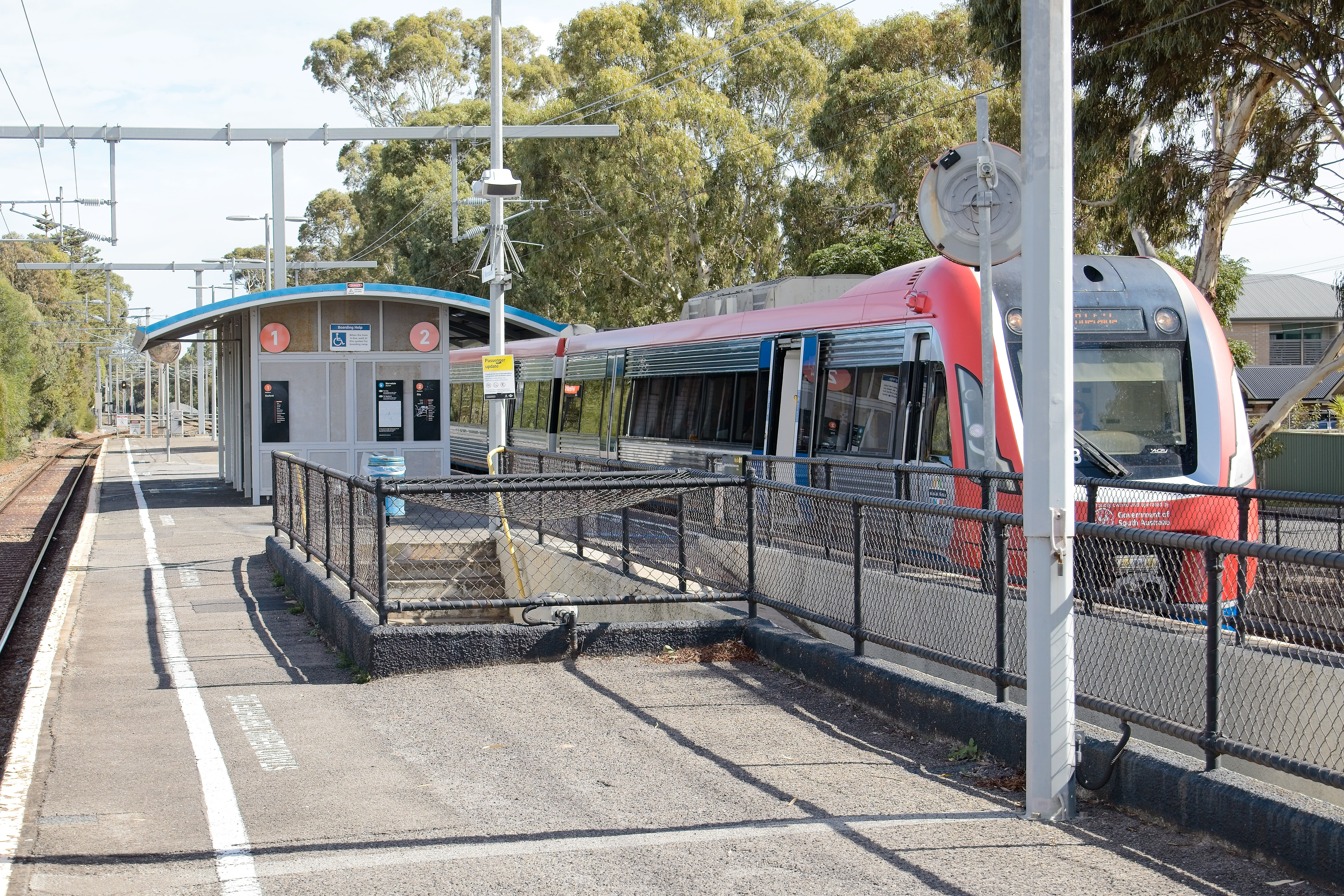
- Westbound view from Platform 1, April 2026

General information
- Location: Railway Terrace, Warradale
- Coordinates: 35°00′41″S 138°32′01″E
- Line: Seaford
- Distance: 13.7 km from Adelaide
- Platforms: 2
- Tracks: 2
- Bus routes: None

Construction
- Structure type: Ground
- Parking: Yes
- Cycle facilities: No

History
- Opened: 1956
- Rebuilt: 1970s

Services
| Preceding station | Adelaide Metro | Following station |
|---|---|---|
| Oaklands towards Adelaide | Seaford line | Hove towards Seaford |
Location

Warradale railway station is located on the Seaford line. Situated in the south-western Adelaide suburb of Warradale, it is 13.7 kilometres from Adelaide station. It was gutted by fire and subsequently rebuilt.

== History ==
Warradale Station was built in 1956, 42 years after Hove Station was opened which is just west of the station. The station was destroyed by a fire in 2002 and was subsequently rebuilt. It is located on Railway Terrace, Warradale, close to the Oaklands station to the east.

It consists of one centre island platform accessible by an underpass and a pedestrian crossing at the eastern end of the platform. The station has been resurfaced in patches numerous times and is quite an uneven surface. The shelter of the station is unique on the Seaford line but similar to the original Elizabeth and Elizabeth South shelters. The station underpass is one similar to the Brighton underpass and is reasonably narrow.

== Services by platform ==
| Platform | Destination/s |
|---|---|
| 1 | Seaford |
| 2 | Adelaide |
