= Chris Hanna =

Chris Hanna is the name of:

- Chris Hanna (RAAF), a double recipient of the Conspicuous Service Cross (Australia)
- Chris Hanna, one of the members of the CKY crew

== See also ==
- Kris Hanna
