= North Brighton, South Australia =

North Brighton
- Suburb
- Coordinates: 35°00′24″S 138°31′12″E
- Country: Australia
- State: South Australia
- Region: Southern Adelaide
- City: Adelaide
- LGA: City of Holdfast Bay
- Location: 13 km (8.1 mi) from Adelaide city centre

Government
  - State electorate: Gibson
  - Federal division: Hindmarsh

Population
  - Total: 2,665 (SAL 2021)
- Time zone: UTC+9:30 (ACST)
  - Summer (DST): UTC+10:30 (ACST)
- County: Adelaide
Suburbs around North Brighton
Gulf St Vincent	Somerton Park	Somerton Park
Gulf St Vincent	North Brighton	Warradale
Gulf St Vincent	Hove	Warradale

North Brighton is a suburb of Adelaide in South Australia. The northern reaches of the suburb are occupied by Brighton Secondary School and the campus of Minda Inc, a large disability support organisation. To the south, the suburb is bounded by the Townsend Park Retirement Village and Marymount College. Other points of interest are a small shopping centre on the corner of Holder and Brighton Roads, and North Brighton Beach.
