= Seacombe Gardens, South Australia =

Seacombe Gardens
- Suburb
- Country: Australia
- State: South Australia
- City: Adelaide
- LGA: City of Marion

Government
  - State electorate: Gibson
  - Federal division: Boothby

Population
  - Total: 3,373 (SAL 2021)
- Postcode: 5047
Suburbs around Seacombe Gardens
Warradale	Oaklands Park Westfield Marion	Marion
Dover Gardens	Seacombe Gardens	Sturt
Seaview Downs	Seacombe Heights	Darlington

Seacombe Gardens is a suburb of Adelaide in the City of Marion, South Australia.

== See also ==
- List of Adelaide suburbs
