= Morphettville, South Australia =

Morphettville
- Suburb
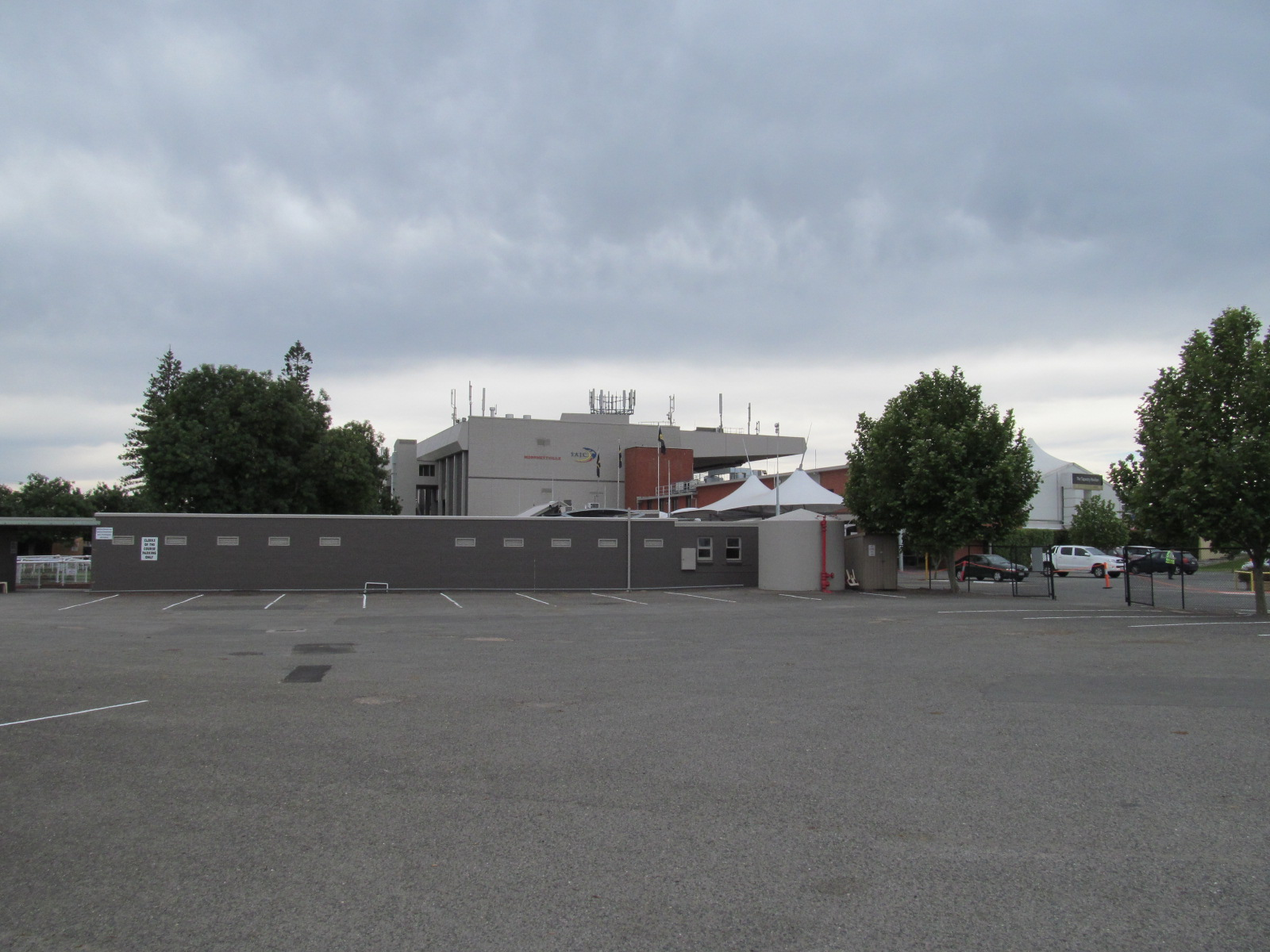

- Coordinates: 34°59′20″S 138°32′20″E
- Country: Australia
- State: South Australia
- City: Adelaide
- LGA: City of Marion
- Location: 9 km (5.6 mi) SW of Adelaide central business district; 4 km (2.5 mi) E of Glenelg

Government
  - State electorate: Morphett
  - Federal division: Boothby

Population
  - Total: 3,686 (SAL 2021)
- Postcode: 5043
Suburbs around Morphettville
Novar Gardens, Glenelg East	Camden Park	Plympton
Glengowrie	Morphettville	Park Holme
Warradale	Oaklands Park	Marion

Morphettville is a suburb of Adelaide, South Australia in the City of Marion.

The major feature of the suburb is the Morphettville Racecourse. The tram barn storage and maintenance facility is across Morphett Road from the racecourse, in the neighbouring suburb of Glengowrie opening in October 1986. The southern part of the suburb is predominantly residential, with the Sturt River flowing through from south to northwest. The Morphett Arms Hotel is on the western side of Morphett Road, Glengowrie. Both the suburb and the racecourse were named after John Morphett, a prominent early settler.

== Location ==
Morphettville is bounded by the Glenelg tram line in the north, Morphett Road on the West, Park Terrace and Hendrie Street in the East and Oaklands Road in the South. It is home to the Morphettville Park Football Club at Kellett Reserve, Denham Avenue, the Dara School in Gordon Terrace, a school for gifted students. Gymnastics South Australia is located in Rosedale Avenue right behind the Marion Leisure and Fitness Centre.

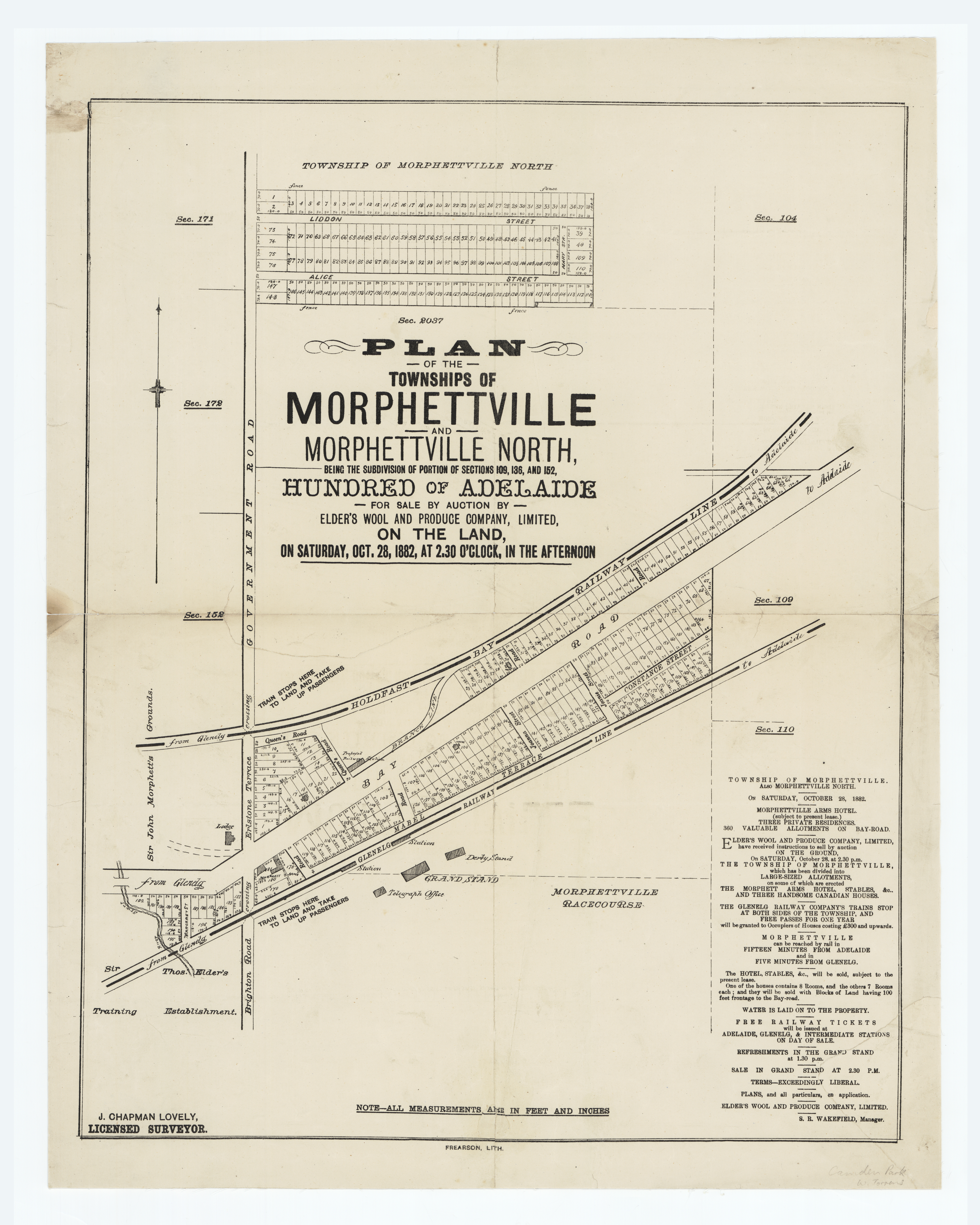

== Industry ==
In February 1977 the State Transport Authority opened a bus depot on the corner of Morphett and Oaklands roads on the former site of Adelaide's largest drive-in cinema. Today it is operated by Torrens Transit. In July 2026 it was upgraded to accommodate electric buses.

== See also ==
- List of Adelaide suburbs
