= Oaklands Park, South Australia =

Oaklands Park
- Suburb
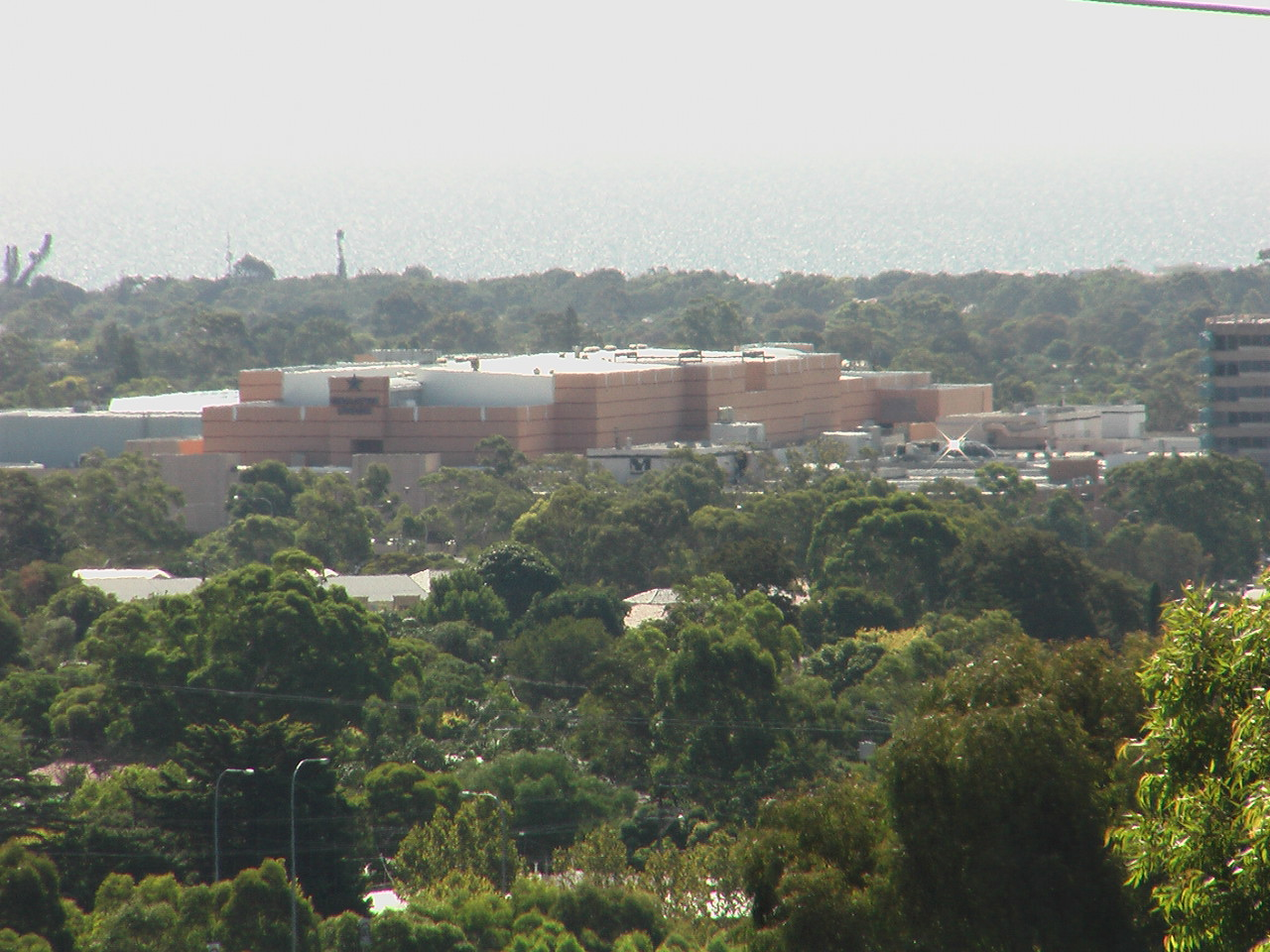
- Westfield (Marion), one of Adelaide's major suburban malls

- Country: Australia
- State: South Australia
- LGA: City of Marion
- Established: 1906

Government
  - State electorate: Gibson
  - Federal division: Boothby

Population
  - Total: 3,948 (SAL 2021)
- Postcode: 5046
Suburbs around Oaklands Park
Glengowrie	Morphettville	Park Holme
Warradale	Oaklands Park	Marion
Dover Gardens	Seacombe Gardens	Sturt

Oaklands Park is a southern suburb of Adelaide, South Australia in the City of Marion. The Marion Shopping Centre is a major feature of the suburb.

== History ==
On 14 December 1906, Oaklands was bought by Thomas Currie Tait for £15,000.

In 1923 Tait offered 'The Park' (from the corner of Marion and Oaklands Roads to the homestead) to the South Australian Government for £100 an acre. When the offer was not accepted, Hamiltons acquired the vineyard and in September 1923, W. Pethick " Sons, vignerons and orchardists, bought the homestead. The remaining land, about 132 acres (0.53 km^{2}), was secured by T.M. Burke Pty Ltd, for £23,000, for building allotments.

The portion of Oaklands which became the site of the Warradale Army Camp in both World Wars, was acquired from the State on 26 July 1945 for £24,020. The Barracks comprise 56 acres (230,000 m^{2}) bounded on the north by Oaklands Road and on the west by Morphett Road. In 1940 the area was occupied by 9 Infantry Brigade as a mobilization centre and brigade camp and on 10 February 1942 the site was taken over under National Security Regulations.

In 1952 when a number of Oaklands Estate gum-trees were being uprooted to make way for Housing Trust homes a local group formed the Oaklands Estate Residents' Association in the hope of preserving some of the remaining trees. In a triangle bounded by Oaklands Road, Sturt River and the Marino (now the Seaford) railway line, they volunteered to plant and care for 1,200 native street trees including a shrubbery around Marion Railway Station. They also helped to initiate the gazetting of a sizeable portion of land adjacent to Sturt River for recreational use. The council has now taken responsibility for that area.

Oaklands Park Post Office opened on 10 February 1969.

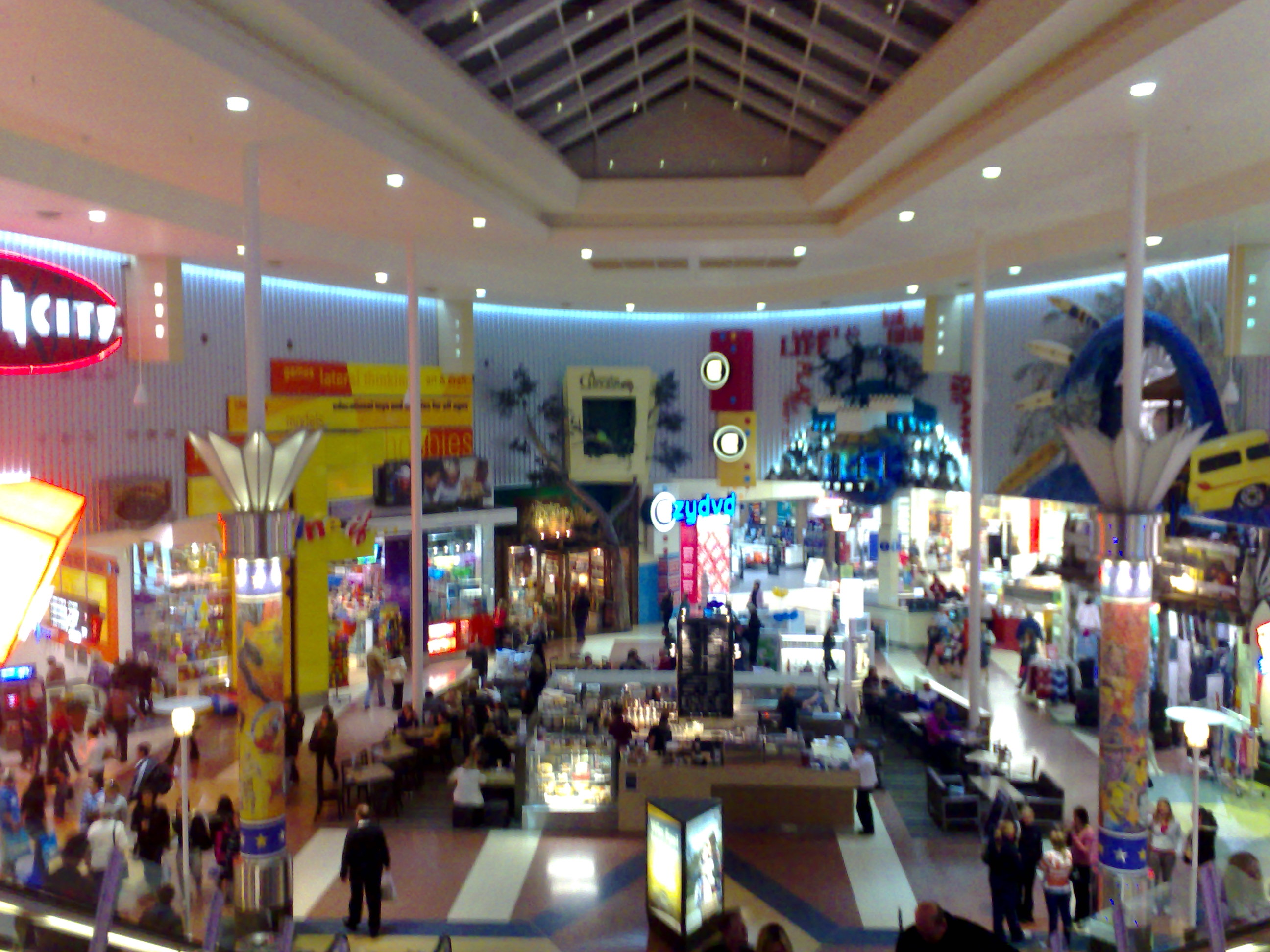
Looking down on centre of Westfield Marion

In 1971 the South Australian Government set aside 7 ha (17 1/4 acres) of land in Oaklands Park for its Road Safety Centre and on 17 October 1972 the centre was officially opened. After the Open Day on 22 October the centre began operating complete with traffic lights and road signs.

== Amenities ==
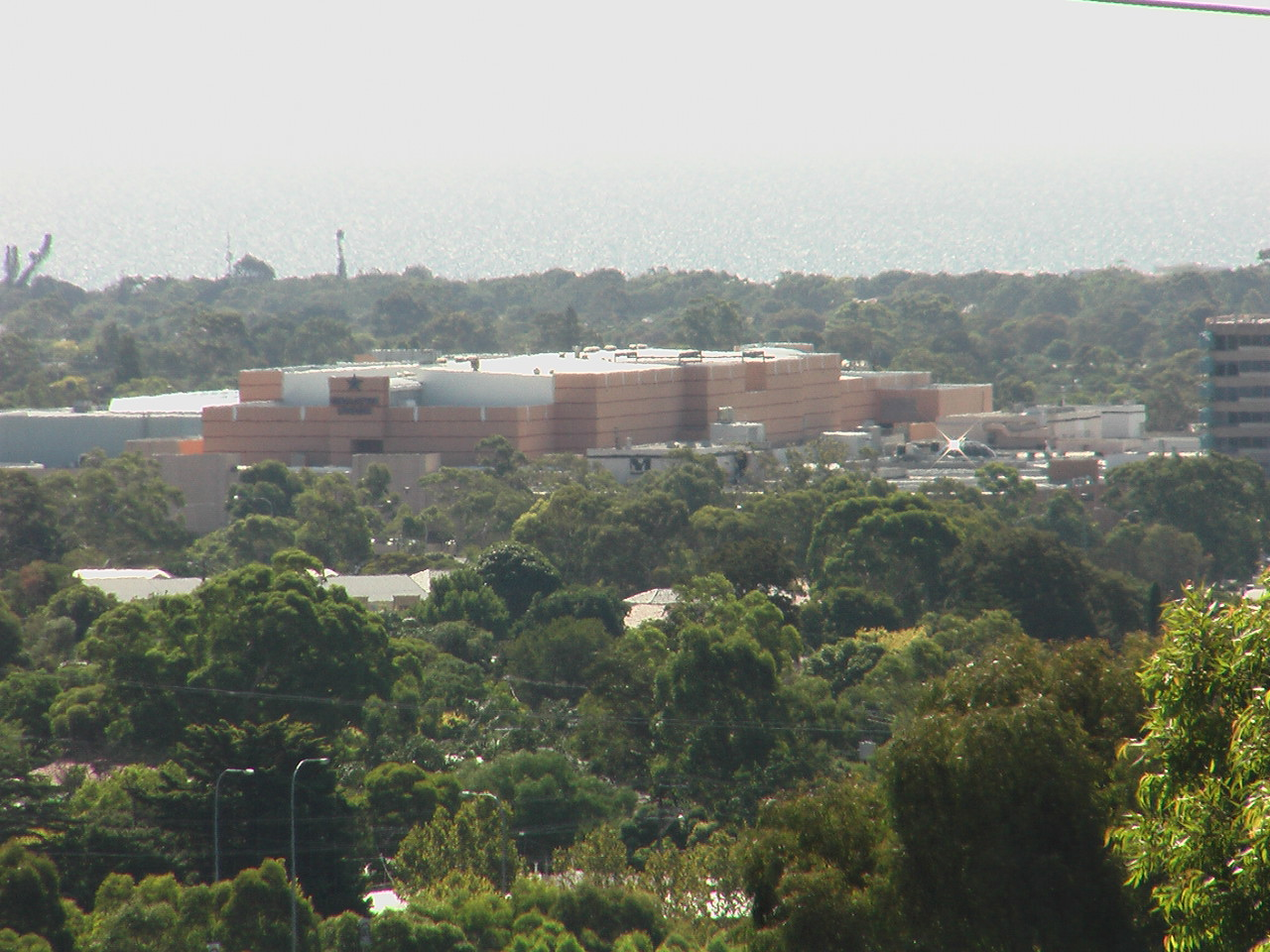
Westfield Marion, a large shopping mall, viewed from Bedford Park

Oaklands Park is best known as the location of the Westfield Marion shopping centre, the largest shopping complex in Adelaide. It includes over 300 speciality stores and includes a cinema, several department and discount stores, three supermarkets, and a food court.

The Marion Cultural Centre is also adjacent to the Marion Shopping Centre that contains an art gallery, café, library and a theatre. Events are held there all through the year with art exhibitions, theatre performances and Blue Light Disco's being held.

Opposite the Marion Cultural Centre is the South Australia Aquatic and Leisure Centre, also known as the State Aquatic Centre.

== Transport ==
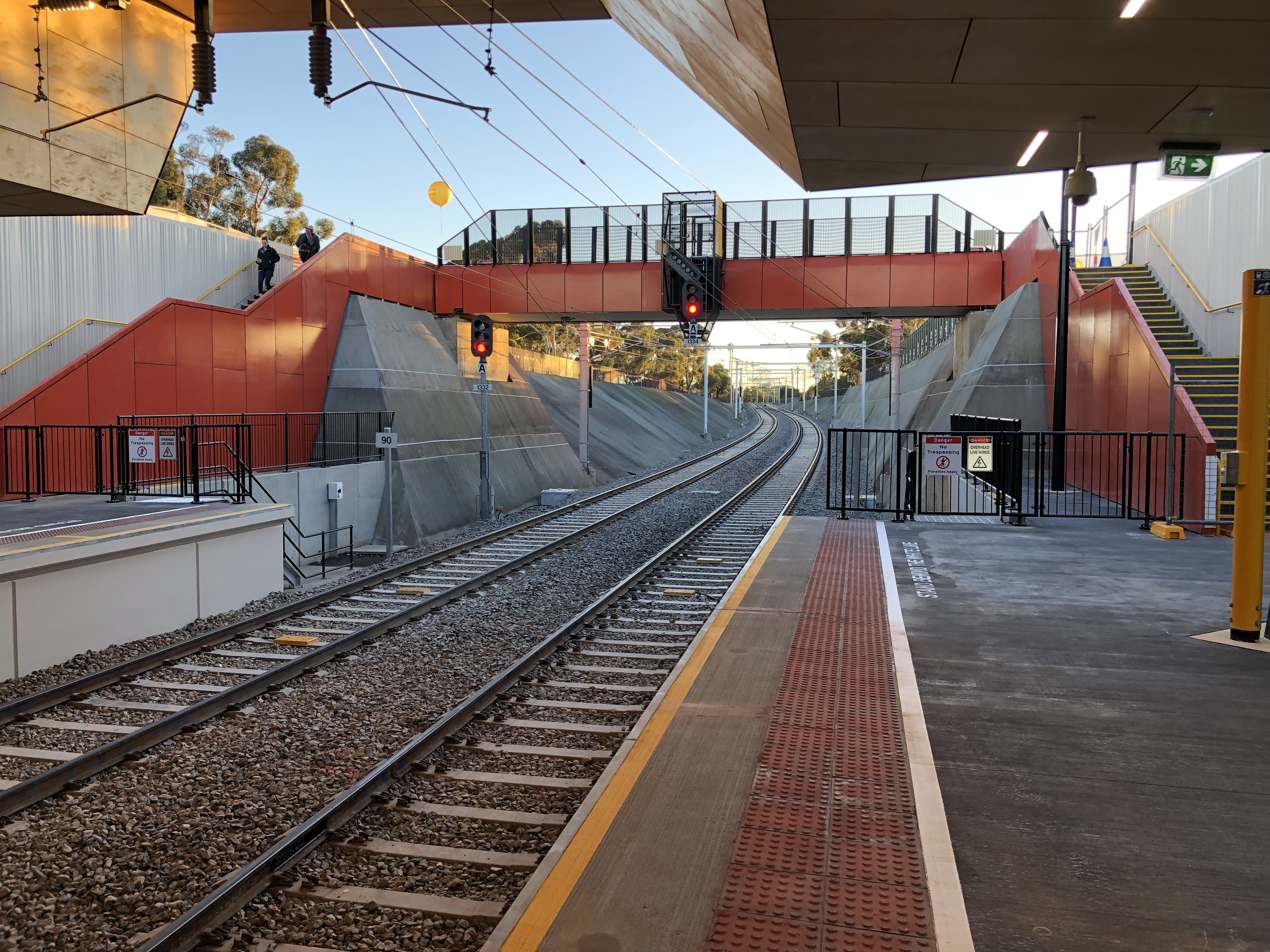
Oaklands transport interchange

The Seaford railway line travels through the suburb and stops at Oaklands railway station. The station has been redeveloped as a transport exchange by the South Australian Government and Marion Council to improve access to surrounding facilities.

There is a bus interchange at the Westfield Marion with connections to Adelaide city, Flinders University, Hallett Cove, Noarlunga Centre and Port Adelaide.

== Demographics ==
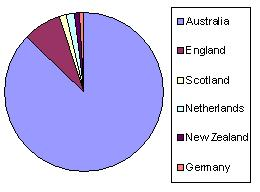
Graph of People's Birthplaces in Oaklands Park in 2001

=== 2001 ===
In the 2001 Australian Bureau of Statistics Census, the population was 3,029 with the females outnumbering the males 53.6% against 46.4%, 1.0% of the population of Oaklands Park Indigenous Australians.

With most people in Oaklands Park born in Australia, 6.8% of the suburb's population was born in England, then the other origins of the people in the suburb being (in descending order): Scotland, Netherlands, New Zealand and Germany.

=== 2021 ===
In the 2021 Census, the population was recorded as 3,948 with women making up 53.7% of the population and 2.3% identifying as Aboriginal and/or Torres Strait Islander.

63.4% of people living in Oaklands Park were born in Australia, with 4.4% of the suburb's population born in England. The demographic shifts from previous censuses with birth countries of the people in the suburb being recorded as (in descending order): China (excludes SARs and Taiwan), India, Nepal and the Netherlands.

== See also ==
- List of Adelaide suburbs
