= Alan Sibbons =

Australian politician

Alan John Sibbons was an Australian politician who represented the South Australian House of Assembly seat of Mitchell from 2010 to 2014 for the Labor Party.

South Australian House of Assembly
Preceded by Kris Hanna	Member for Mitchell; 2010–2014	Succeeded by Corey Wingard
