= Colin Caudell =

Australian politician

Colin John Caudell was an Australian politician who represented the South Australian House of Assembly seat of Mitchell for the Liberal Party from 1993 to 1997.

South Australian House of Assembly
Preceded by Paul Holloway	Member for Mitchell; 1993–1997	Succeeded by Kris Hanna
