= Paul Holloway =

Australian politician

The Honourable Paul Holloway

Attorney-General of South Australia
- In office 30 June 2003 – 29 August 2003
- Preceded by: Michael Atkinson
- Succeeded by: Michael Atkinson

Member of the South Australian Legislative Council
- In office 26 September 1995 – 13 September 2011
- Preceded by: Mario Feleppa
- Succeeded by: Gerry Kandelaars

Member for Mitchell
- In office 25 November 1989 – 11 December 1993
- Preceded by: Ron Payne
- Succeeded by: Colin Caudell

Personal details
- Born: 20 August 1949 (age 77)
- Party: Australian Labor Party (SA)

Paul Holloway (born 20 August 1949) is a former Australian politician who represented the Australian Labor Party in the South Australian House of Assembly seat of Mitchell from 1989 to 1993, and in the South Australian Legislative Council from 1995 to 2011.

== Early life ==
Holloway was an Electorate Research Officer, and holds BSc, BEc, BE (Hons) qualifications from the University of Adelaide.

== Politics ==
Holloway served in the Rann Labor cabinet including such positions as Attorney-General of South Australia, Minister for Mineral Resources Development, Minister for Urban Development and Planning, and Minister for Small Business. He was aligned with Labor's Right faction.

As Minister for Resources Development, Holloway oversaw a rapid expansion in the mining sector in South Australia. During his tenure, the number of major mining licences issued by the State Government expanded from 4 to 17. He also oversaw a dramatic increase in spending on mining exploration. In 2008, he received the Legend in Mining award. This acknowledged his role as one of the architects of South Australia's PACE (Plan for Accelerating Exploration) program which co-funded exploration activity in the state. One result of his initiative was the discovery of the Carrapateena deposit, currently being developed by OZ Minerals. PACE has since been succeeded by the PACE 2020 program. Holloway was supportive of the expansion of South Australia's uranium mining sector.

As Minister for Urban Development and Planning, Holloway's work resulted in the publication of the Labor government's 30-Year Plan for Greater Adelaide.

Holloway announced his resignation from the Rann Labor cabinet in early 2011, before announcing in mid-2011 that he would resign from parliament altogether. Gerry Kandelaars was appointed as his replacement on 13 September 2011.

== After politics ==
Since leaving Parliament, Holloway has accepted positions on a number of boards. Appointments and positions include:

- Woomera Protected Area Advisory Board - Deputy Chair (2012–present)
- SA Resources Industry Development Board (2012–2015)
- Minerals and Energy Advisory Council (2015–present)
- Roxby Downs Advisory Reference Group (2013–present)

He also continues to work as a consultant for Griffins Lawyers.

Political offices
Preceded by Michael Atkinson	Attorney-General of South Australia; 2003	Succeeded by Michael Atkinson
Parliament of South Australia
Preceded by Ron Payne	Member for Mitchell; 1989–1993	Succeeded by Colin Caudell
