= Electoral results for the district of Mitchell (Western Australia) =

Western Australian district election results

This is a list of electoral results for the electoral district of Mitchell in Western Australian state elections.

== Members for Mitchell ==
| Member | Party | Term |
|---|---|---|
| David Smith | Labor | 1983–1996 |
| Dan Sullivan | Liberal | 1996–2008 |
| Dan Sullivan | Family First | 2008–2008 |

== Election results ==
=== Elections in the 2000s ===
2005 Western Australian state election: Leschenault
| Party | Candidate | Votes | % | ±% |
|---|---|---|---|---|
| Liberal | Dan Sullivan | 6,022 | 50.8 | −1.3 |
| Labor | Anthony Marinovich | 4,247 | 35.8 | +9.1 |
| Greens | Dee Wickham | 761 | 6.4 | +0.7 |
| Christian Democrats | Ross Lecras | 426 | 3.6 | +3.6 |
| One Nation | Caroline Whitworth | 405 | 3.4 | −7.6 |
| Total formal votes | | 11,861 | 95.1 | −2.1 |
| Informal votes | | 617 | 4.9 | +2.1 |
| Turnout | | 12,478 | 91.5 | |
Two-party-preferred result
| Liberal | Dan Sullivan | 6,836 | 57.7 | −4.1 |
| Labor | Anthony Marinovich | 5,014 | 42.3 | +4.1 |
| Liberal hold | | Swing | −4.1 | |

2001 Western Australian state election: Mitchell
| Party | Candidate | Votes | % | ±% |
|---|---|---|---|---|
| Liberal | Dan Sullivan | 7,475 | 48.8 | +0.6 |
| Labor | Margaret Lane | 4,537 | 29.6 | −11.8 |
| One Nation | Andy Konnecke | 1,742 | 11.4 | +11.4 |
| Greens | Patsie Gubler | 897 | 5.9 | +0.4 |
| Independent | Ross Slater | 267 | 1.7 | +1.7 |
| Independent | Lyn Kearsley | 224 | 1.5 | +1.5 |
| Democrats | Elizabeth Hellyer | 185 | 1.2 | −1.0 |
| Total formal votes | | 15,327 | 96.7 | +0.1 |
| Informal votes | | 529 | 3.3 | −0.1 |
| Turnout | | 15,856 | 91.7 | |
Two-party-preferred result
| Liberal | Dan Sullivan | 8,866 | 58.2 | +5.0 |
| Labor | Margaret Lane | 6,367 | 41.8 | −5.0 |
| Liberal hold | | Swing | +5.0 | |

=== Elections in the 1990s ===
1996 Western Australian state election: Mitchell
| Party | Candidate | Votes | % | ±% |
|---|---|---|---|---|
| Liberal | Dan Sullivan | 6,146 | 48.2 | +6.6 |
| Labor | Melissa Parke | 5,272 | 41.4 | −2.6 |
| Greens | Peter Eckersley | 701 | 5.5 | +0.2 |
| National | Peter Prowse | 343 | 2.7 | +2.7 |
| Democrats | Morgan Wilde | 279 | 2.2 | +0.8 |
| Total formal votes | | 12,741 | 96.6 | −0.2 |
| Informal votes | | 450 | 3.4 | +0.2 |
| Turnout | | 13,191 | 92.8 | |
Two-party-preferred result
| Liberal | Dan Sullivan | 6,774 | 53.2 | +3.7 |
| Labor | Melissa Parke | 5,961 | 46.8 | −3.7 |
| Liberal gain from Labor | | Swing | +3.7 | |

1993 Western Australian state election: Mitchell
| Party | Candidate | Votes | % | ±% |
|---|---|---|---|---|
| Labor | David Smith | 5,245 | 46.1 | −11.3 |
| Liberal | Kerrol Gildersleeve | 4,454 | 39.2 | −3.4 |
| Greens | Jill Reading | 557 | 4.9 | +4.9 |
| Independent | John Sibson | 513 | 4.5 | +4.5 |
| Independent | Ronald Cook | 468 | 4.1 | +4.1 |
| Democrats | Bernard Noonan | 133 | 1.2 | +1.2 |
| Total formal votes | | 11,370 | 96.6 | −1.3 |
| Informal votes | | 405 | 3.4 | +1.3 |
| Turnout | | 11,775 | 95.0 | +2.9 |
Two-party-preferred result
| Labor | David Smith | 6,012 | 52.9 | −4.5 |
| Liberal | Kerrol Gildersleeve | 5,358 | 47.1 | +4.5 |
| Labor hold | | Swing | −4.5 | |

=== Elections in the 1980s ===
1989 Western Australian state election: Mitchell
| Party | Candidate | Votes | % | ±% |
|---|---|---|---|---|
| Labor | David Smith | 5,394 | 57.4 | −5.5 |
| Liberal | Beverley Bradshaw | 4,002 | 42.6 | +5.5 |
| Total formal votes | | 9,396 | 97.9 | |
| Informal votes | | 204 | 2.1 | |
| Turnout | | 9,600 | 92.1 | |
| Labor hold | | Swing | −5.5 | |

1986 Western Australian state election: Mitchell
| Party | Candidate | Votes | % | ±% |
|---|---|---|---|---|
| Labor | David Smith | 6,376 | 60.0 | +3.1 |
| Liberal | Trevor Slater | 4,243 | 40.0 | −3.1 |
| Total formal votes | | 10,619 | 98.1 | +0.5 |
| Informal votes | | 205 | 1.9 | −0.5 |
| Turnout | | 10,824 | 93.0 | +0.9 |
| Labor hold | | Swing | +3.1 | |

1983 Western Australian state election: Mitchell
| Party | Candidate | Votes | % | ±% |
|---|---|---|---|---|
| Labor | David Smith | 5,001 | 56.9 | |
| Liberal | Margaret Craig | 3,785 | 43.1 | |
| Total formal votes | | 8,716 | 97.6 | |
| Informal votes | | 215 | 2.4 | |
| Turnout | | 9,001 | 92.1 | |
| Labor hold | | Swing | | |
