= Sarah Andrews (politician) =

Australian politician

Sarah Andrews MP
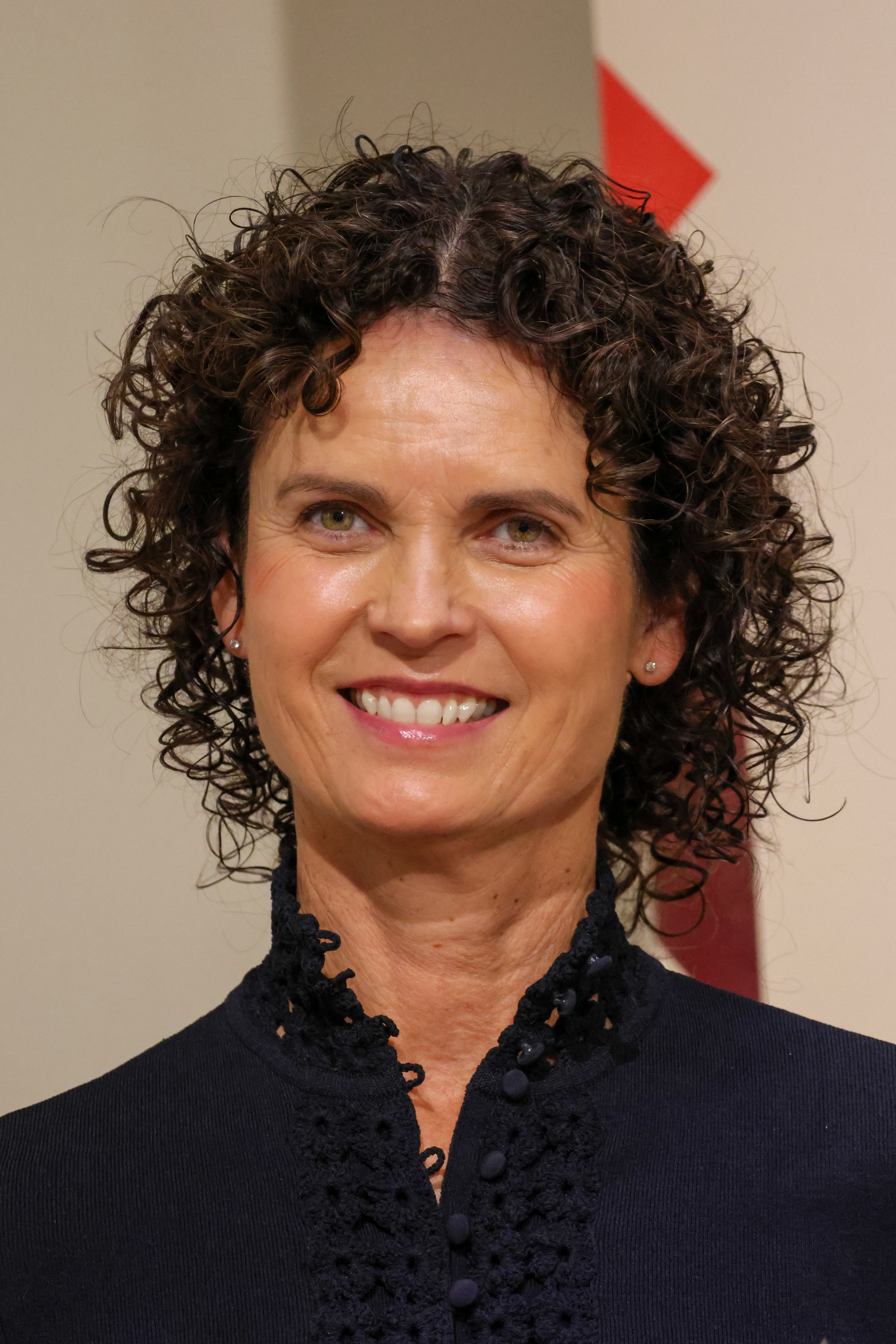
- Andrews in 2026

Assistant Minister for Arts
- Incumbent
- Assumed office 25 March 2026
- Premier: Peter Malinauskas
- Preceded by: Office established

Member of the South Australian House of Assembly for Gibson
- Incumbent
- Assumed office 19 March 2022
- Preceded by: Corey Wingard

Personal details
- Born: 4 July 1971 (age 55)
- Party: Labor
- Education: Westminster School
- Alma mater: Flinders University

Sarah Emily Andrews (born 4 July 1971) is an Australian politician. She has been a Labor Party member of the South Australian House of Assembly since the 2022 election, representing Gibson. With a swing of 12.5 per cent, she defeated the incumbent Liberal Party member, former transport minister Corey Wingard, who had held the seat since 2018 and enjoyed a pre-election margin of 10 per cent. Her election success was not expected.

Andrews grew up within the current boundaries of Gibson, has a Bachelor of Arts in Drama from Flinders University, and is married with two adult children. She previously worked in a senior role with Professionals Australia, the union representing science, technology and engineering professionals.

== Personal life and career ==
Sarah Emily Andrews grew up in the southern beachside suburb of Hove, and attended Paringa Park Primary School, Brighton Primary School, attended Westminster School and gained a Bachelor of Arts in Drama with honours at Flinders University. She was previously employed for many years by Professionals Australia – the union representing science, technology and engineering professionals – and prior to the 2022 election was the director of the organisation responsible for South Australia and Western Australia. Andrews is married, has two adult children, and plays competitive sport with the Westminster Old Scholars Soccer Club.

== Political career ==
Andrews was the Labor Party candidate for Gibson at the 2022 state election, when she received 52.5 per cent of the 2PP votes, achieving an 12.5 per cent swing to the Labor Party. Her share of the first-preference votes was 39.6 per cent. She defeated the incumbent Liberal Party member, former Minister for Transport and Infrastructure, Corey Wingard, who had held the seat since 2018 and enjoyed a pre-election margin of 10 per cent. Gibson was considered a safe Liberal seat and Andrews' win was not expected. She was supported in her campaign by the mentorship of Kay Hallahan, former deputy leader of the Western Australian Labor Party, through Emily's List Australia.

Since 3 May 2022, Andrews has been a member of the parliamentary Natural Resources Committee, and was a member of the Legislative Review Committee from 3 May to 5 July 2022. She was a member of the COVID-19 Direction Accountability and Oversight Committee from 2 June to 24 November 2022. She was also a member of the Access to Urinary Tract Infection Treatment Committee from 1 December 2022 to 17 November 2023. Between 6 July and 17 November 2023 she was a member of the Establishment of Adelaide University Committee.

Following the Labor landslide at 2026 election Andrews was appointed Assistant Minister for Arts in the second Malinauskas ministry.

== Footnotes ==
South Australian House of Assembly
Preceded by Corey Wingard	Member for Gibson; 2022–present	Incumbent
Political offices
New office	Assistant Minister for Arts; 2026–present	Incumbent
