= South Australia Aquatic and Leisure Centre =

Swimming venue in Adelaide, Australia

Coordinates: 35°00′45″S 138°32′29″E

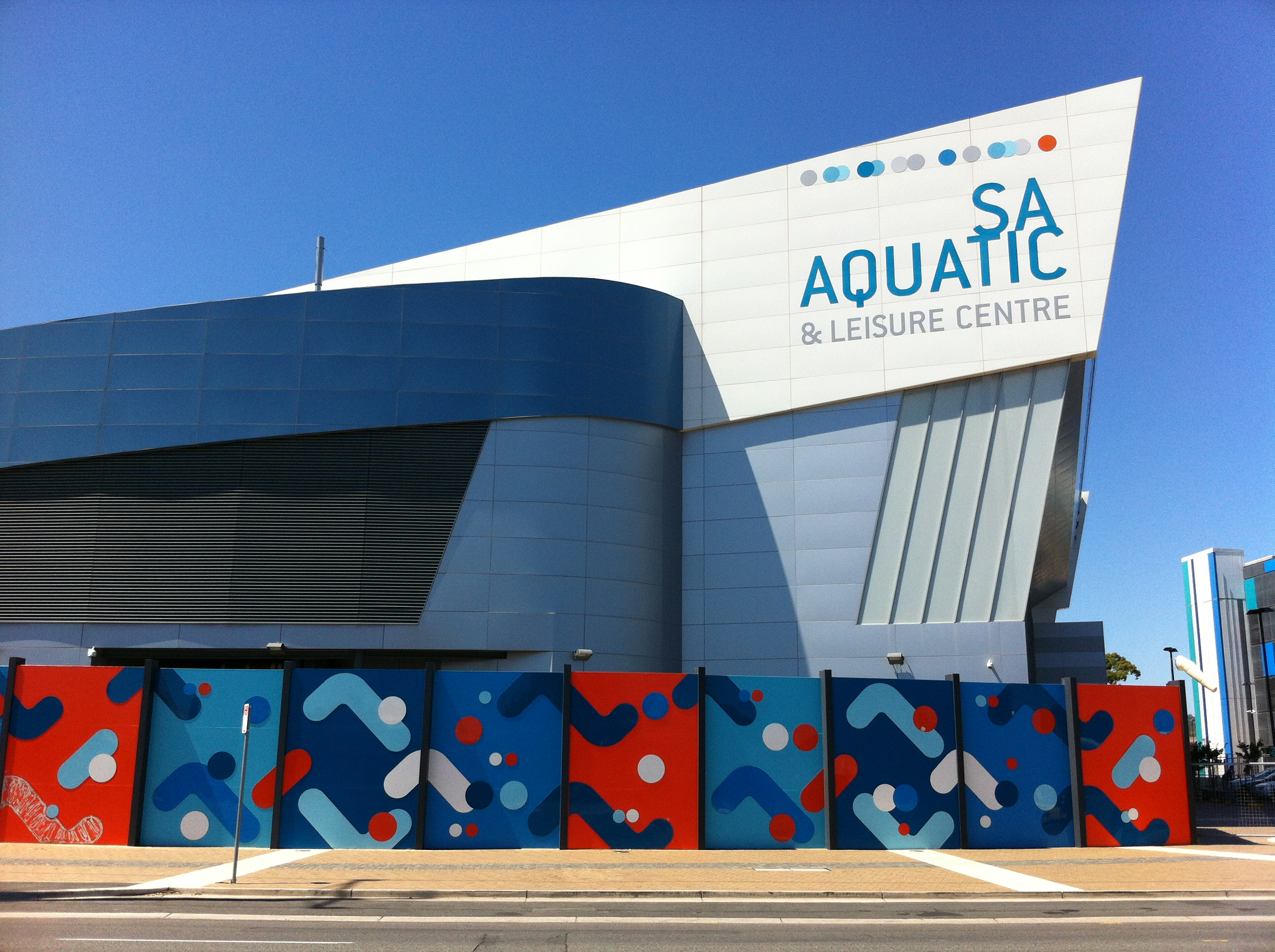
- Exterior of the complex
- Interactive map of South Australia Aquatic and Leisure Centre
- Full name: South Australia Aquatic and Leisure Centre
- Address: City of Marion, Adelaide, South Australia, Australia
- Capacity: 3460

Construction
- Built: October 2009 – April 2011
- Opened: 26 April 2011
- Architect: Peddle Thorp Architects

Tenant
- Marion Swimming Club

The South Australia Aquatic and Leisure Centre (SAALC), also known as the State Aquatic Centre, is a swimming venue located in the Adelaide suburb of Oaklands Park in South Australia. The centre is managed by the YMCA on behalf of the Government of South Australia.

In April 2011 South Australian Premier Mike Rann opened the centre, the most advanced swimming and diving facilities in Australia, in Marion. He was joined at the opening by Marion Mayor Felicity-Ann Lewis. Lewis and Rann had championed the project for some years to enable Olympic standard aquatic sports to occur in South Australia.

The A$100 million centre was designed by Peddle Thorp Architects and constructed by Candetti Constructions. Built between October 2009 and April 2011, the centre was officially open on 26 April 2011 after the 2011 Australian Age Championships were held from 18 to 23 April.

On 1 July 2012, the Marion Swimming Club became the resident swimming club of the centre.

In the past the centre has hosted the 2012 and the 2013 Australian Swimming Championships. Located at the end of Westfield Marion.

More recently, the 2016 Australian Olympic Trials and 2016 Swimming Australia National Age Championships were hosted at the centre alongside National Water Polo League games and the 2016 Diving SA Olympic Simulation event.

In 2017, a joint announcement was made between The South Australian Government and Swimming Australia that the SA Aquatic and Leisure Centre will host the 2019 National Swimming Championships and the 2020 Tokyo Olympic Trials.

The centre is managed by Adam Luscombe.

== Image gallery ==
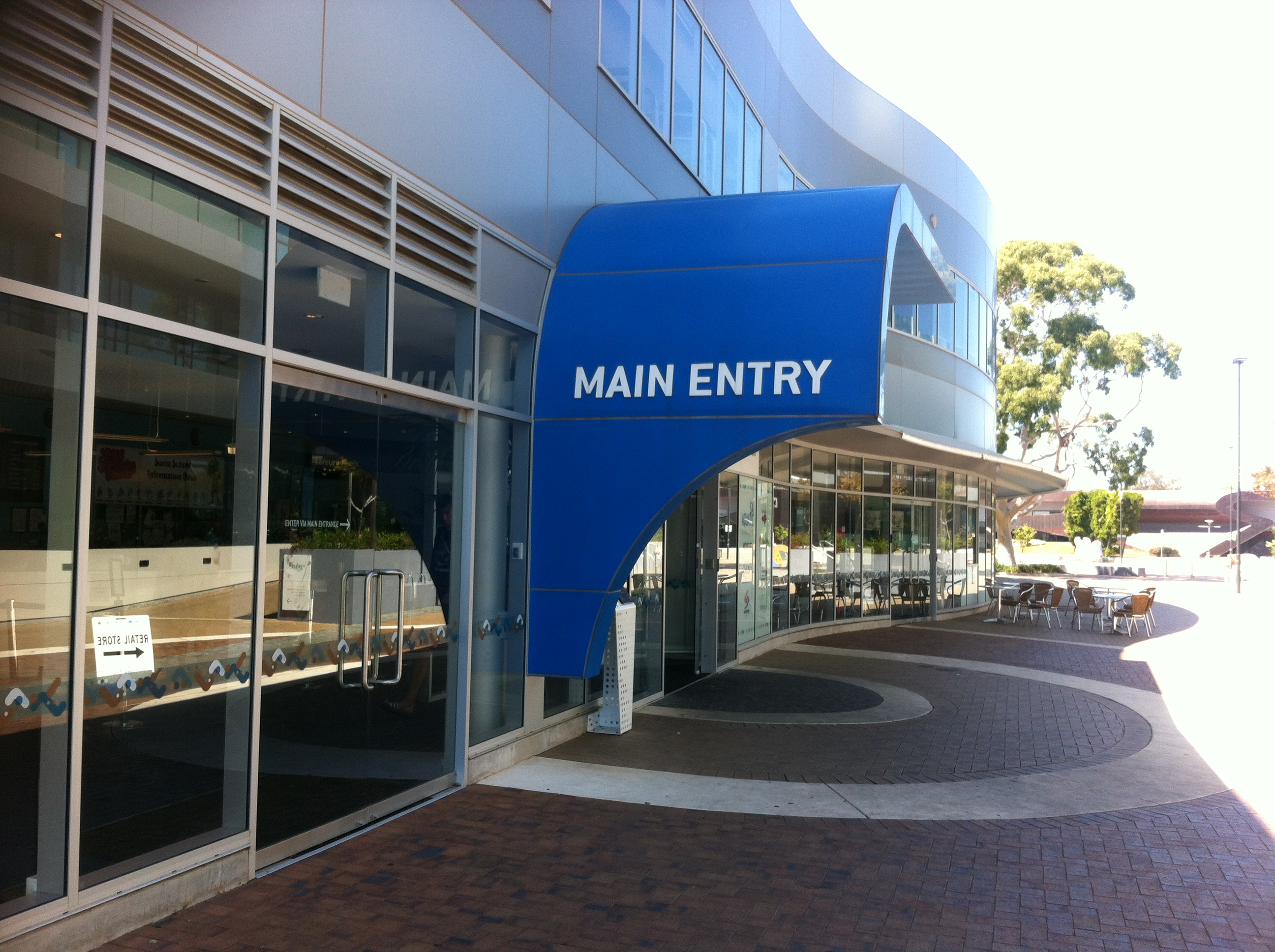
Main entry of the centre

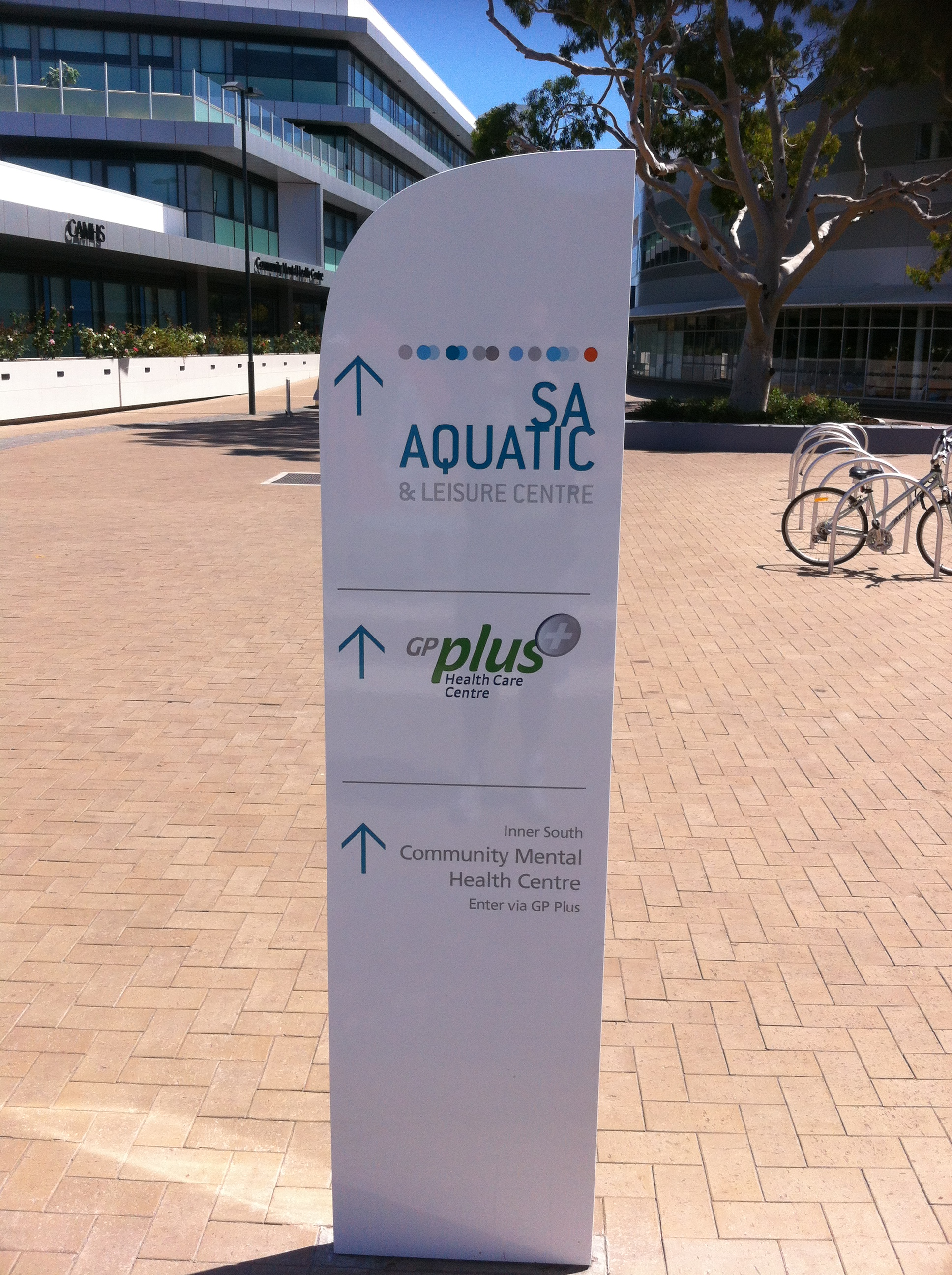
Precinct sign

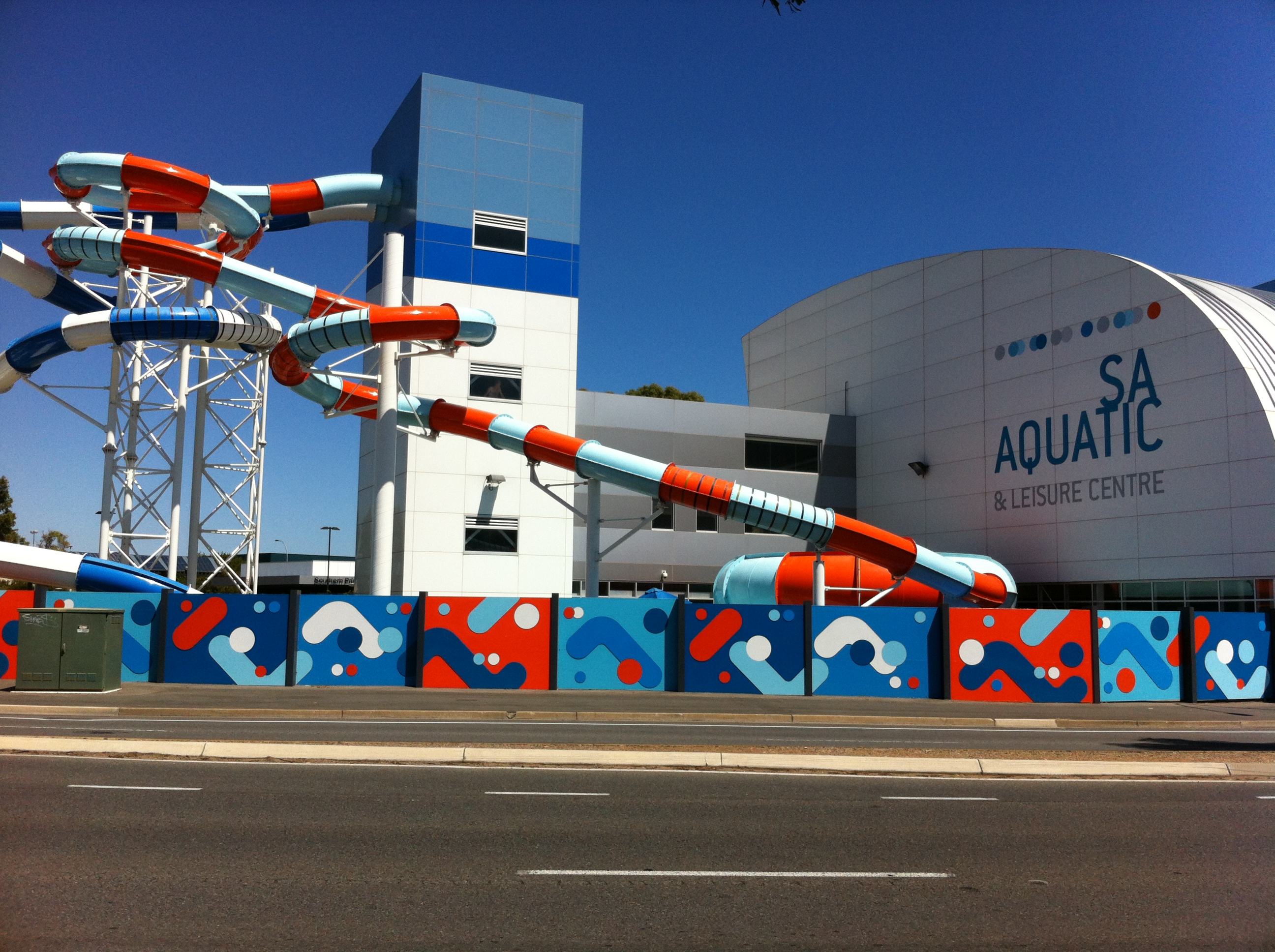
Exterior shot showing the waterslides
