= Ron Payne =

Australian politician

Ronald George Payne (22 October 1925 – 9 April 2015) was an Australian politician who represented the South Australian House of Assembly seat of Mitchell for the Australian Labor Party from 1970 to 1989.

South Australian House of Assembly
New seat	Member for Mitchell; 1970–1989	Succeeded by Paul Holloway
