= Sturt, South Australia =

Sturt
- Suburb
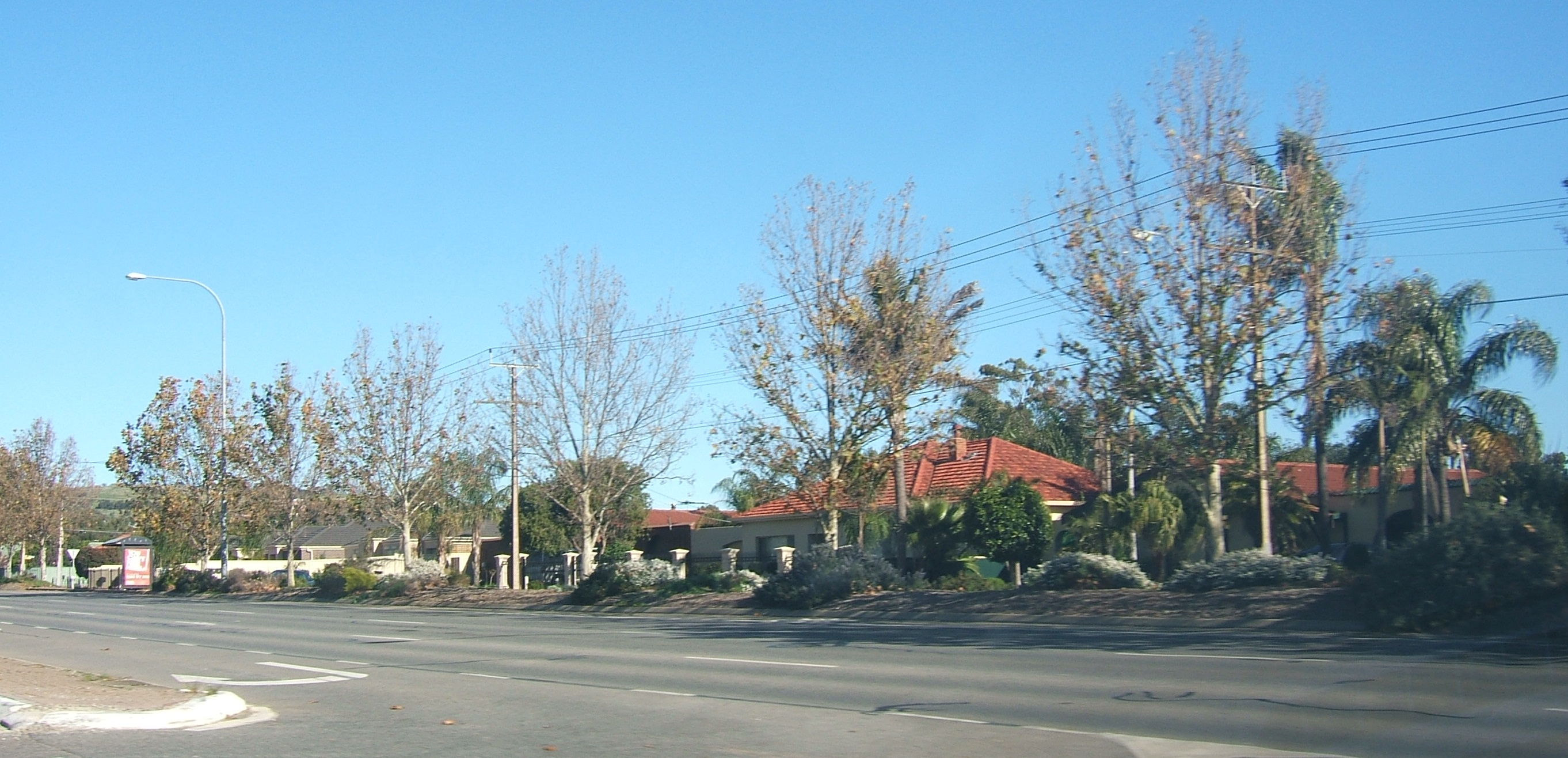
- Houses on the western side of Marion Road

- Country: Australia
- State: South Australia
- City: Adelaide
- LGA: City of Marion

Government
  - State electorate: Gibson
  - Federal division: Boothby

Population
  - Total: 2,787 (SAL 2021)
- Postcode: 5047
Suburbs around Sturt
Oaklands Park	Marion	Mitchell Park
Seacombe Gardens	Sturt	Bedford Park
Seacombe Heights	Darlington

Sturt is a suburb of Adelaide in the City of Marion local government area. It was named after the explorer Captain Charles Sturt.

Sturt is in the South Australian House of Assembly electoral district of Gibson and the Australian House of Representatives Division of Boothby.

== History ==
The first Sturt Post Office opened on 11 October 1849 and closed in 1969. A Darlington South office opened in 1953; it was renamed Sturt South in 1966 and Sturt in 1985.

== See also ==
- List of Adelaide suburbs
