= Kris Hanna =

Australian politician

The Reverend Kris Hanna JP
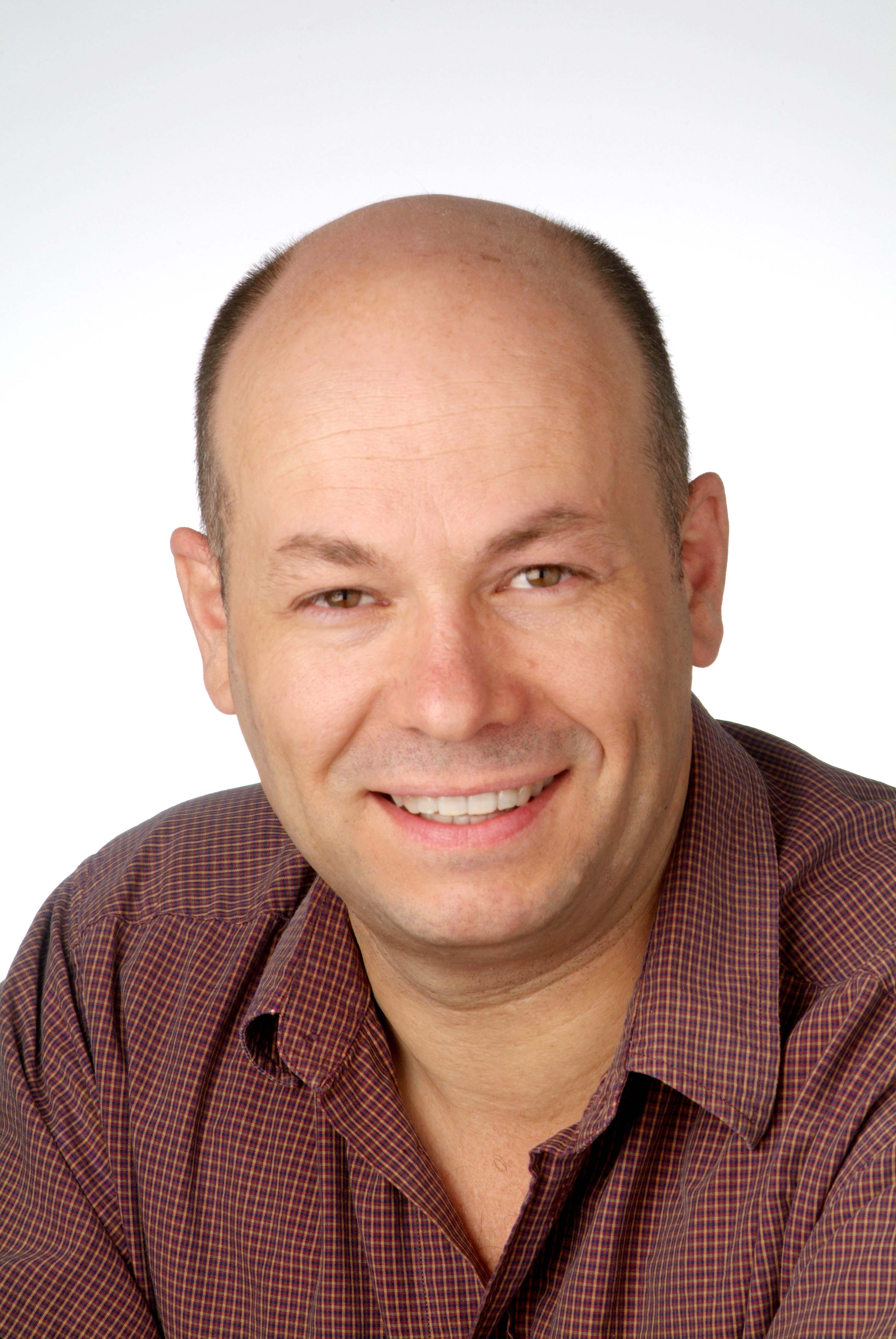

Minister of the Unitarian Church of South Australia
- Incumbent
- Assumed office October 2022
- Preceded by: Rev. Rob MacPherson

12th Mayor of the City of Marion
- Incumbent
- Assumed office November 2014
- Deputy: Ian Crossland
- Preceded by: Dr Felicity-Ann Lewis

Member for Mitchell in the South Australian House of Assembly
- In office 11 October 1997 – 20 March 2010
- Preceded by: Colin Caudell
- Succeeded by: Alan Sibbons

Personal details
- Born: 1962 (age 63–64)
- Party: None
- Other political affiliations: Labor (1997–2003); Greens (2003–2006); Independent (2006–2018); SA-Best (2018)

Kris Hanna (born 1962) is the Mayor of Marion in South Australia. He was the member for Mitchell in the House of Assembly from 1997 until 2010. Originally elected as a member of the Labor Party, Hanna joined the SA Greens in 2003 before becoming an independent member in 2006.

Before entering Parliament, Hanna practised law. He also served as a Councillor for the City of Marion from 1995 to 1997. He returned to practicing law in 2010 and, in 2014 was elected unopposed as Mayor of the City of Marion.

Hanna has served on the Board of Victim Support Service, and is Patron of numerous local sporting clubs. He was a long-serving member of the Seaview High School Governing Council and had been President of Friends of Glenthorne.

While initially elected at the 1997 and 2002 elections as a member of the Labor Party, he moved to the Greens in early 2003. He resigned from the Greens on 8 February 2006, ran in the 2006 election as an independent and won. His chances of retaining his seat in 2006 had been essentially written off by most commentators after his decision to become an independent MP, but he won a narrow victory after a very low Liberal primary vote, and an endorsement from popular independent MP Nick Xenophon. Despite an improved primary vote, he narrowly lost his seat at the 2010 election, finishing third after all non-major party preferences had been distributed.

Hanna sought to have his 2010 election loss overturned by the Supreme Court of South Australia, sitting as the Court of Disputed Returns, saying he fell victim to "misleading and defamatory" leaflets and posters distributed by the Labor Party. The court ruled the leaflets – labelling Hanna "soft on crime" – were defamatory and not factual, yet there was a right to express such opinions. The court dismissed Hanna's case.

Hanna unsuccessfully re-contested the seat of Mitchell at the 2014 election. Some of the local issues Hanna campaigned on were: upgrading the Oaklands rail crossing and making Glenthorne a forested recreational park - both aspirations which have since been realised. In the 2018 South Australian state election he stood as the SA Best candidate for the electoral district of Gibson.

Hanna was re-elected as Mayor of Marion in November 2018 for a further 4-year term. He received 9094 primary votes out of 15907 votes cast. Hanna was re-elected Mayor of Marion in November 2022 for a further 4-year term. He received 11,988 first preference votes out of 19,219 formal ballot papers counted.

As of August 2023, Hanna was serving as the Minister of the Unitarian Church of South Australia.
