= Felicity-Ann Lewis =

Australian politician

Felicity-Ann Lewis OAM

Mayor of Marion
- In office 2000–2014
- Preceded by: Colin Haines
- Succeeded by: Kris Hanna

Personal details
- Born: 1957 (age 68–69) South Australia
- Education: Doctor of Education (2013)
- Alma mater: University of South Australia
- Awards: Centenary Medal (2001); SA Australian of the Year (2014)

Dr Felicity-Ann Lewis OAM (born 1957) is a former mayor of the City of Marion and South Australia's Australian of the Year for 2014. She received a Centenary Medal for service to the community, particularly as Mayor, City of Marion.

Lewis has worked towards reconciliation with Aboriginal people and was on the Aboriginal and Torres Strait Islander War Memorial Fundraising Committee. She has also worked to assist settlement for refugees and migrants. She received a Doctorate of Education from University of South Australia in August 2013 and is a retired senior lecturer in Health Education at Flinders University.

== Local government ==
Lewis served four terms as mayor of Marion between 2000 and 2014. She was also National President of the Australian Local Government Association.

She defeated Raelene Telfer once and Bruce Hull twice to hold the position of mayor of Marion. Lewis did not have to contest the position in 2003.

The 2010 mayoral election saw sitting Mayor Felicity-Ann Lewis against Councillor Raelene Telfer. Lewis ran with the campaign slogan "Experienced Leadership", whilst Raelene Telfer went with "A Full-time Mayor for Marion", which tried to tap into concerns that Lewis was too occupied with the Local Government Association of SA. Telfer's campaign failed and Lewis was returned for another term. Lewis received 7766 votes to Telfer's 6764.

The 2006 mayoral election saw Bruce Hull and Felicity-Ann Lewis against each other for the position for a second time. It had been expected that Lewis would not re-contest but she nominated at the eleventh hour. Former councillor Andrew Cole also ran. Bruce Hull failed once again, gaining 7988 votes to Lewis' 8345 after the distribution of Cole's preferences.

At the 2003 Mayoral election Lewis was elected unopposed.

In the 2021 Queen's Birthday Honours Lewis was awarded the Medal of the Order of Australia for "service to local government, and to the community of Marion".
