= Corey Wingard =

Australian politician

The Honourable Corey Wingard
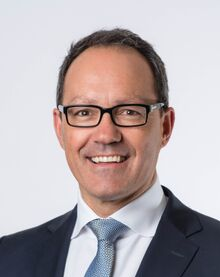

Minister for Recreation, Sport and Racing
- In office 22 March 2018 – 21 March 2022
- Premier: Steven Marshall
- Preceded by: Leon Bignell (as Minister for Recreation and Sport, and as Minister for Racing)
- Succeeded by: Katrine Hildyard

Minister for Infrastructure and Transport
- In office 29 July 2020 – 21 March 2022
- Premier: Steven Marshall
- Preceded by: Stephan Knoll (as Minister for Infrastructure, Transport and Local Government)
- Succeeded by: Tom Koutsantonis

Minister for Police, Emergency Services and Correctional Services
- In office 22 March 2018 – 29 July 2020
- Premier: Steven Marshall
- Preceded by: Chris Picton (as Minister for Police, Minister for Correctional Services, and as Minister for Emergency Services)
- Succeeded by: Vincent Tarzia

Member of the South Australian House of Assembly for Gibson
- In office 17 March 2018 – 19 March 2022
- Preceded by: New seat
- Succeeded by: Sarah Andrews

Member of the South Australian House of Assembly for Mitchell
- In office 15 March 2014 – 17 March 2018
- Preceded by: Alan Sibbons
- Succeeded by: District abolished

Personal details
- Born: 24 March 1971 (age 55) Cleve, South Australia
- Party: Liberal Party of Australia (SA)
- Education: University of South Australia
- Occupation: Sports journalist

Corey Luke Wingard is an Australian former politician. He was a Liberal member of the South Australian House of Assembly from the 2014 state election, representing Mitchell until 2018 and Gibson until his defeat in 2022. Wingard served as the Minister for Infrastructure and Transport. He was also Minister for Recreation, Sport and Racing in the Marshall Ministry from 2018 to 2022. He previously served as the Minister for Police, Emergency Services and Correctional Services.

Following a Cabinet reshuffle on 28 July 2020, Wingard was appointed the Minister for Infrastructure and Transport, and was sworn in on the following day.

He was the Minister when funding was secured to deliver the tunnel solution for the North South Corridor project in Adelaide.

Wingard previously was a journalist and sports presenter for 20 years in Sydney. Melbourne and Adelaide, ran a media advice company, and worked for senator Sean Edwards.

Wingard graduated from the University of South Australia with a degree in exercise and sports. He worked for the SANFL before moving into television where he worked for the Nine Network on the Wide World of Sports and FOX Sports. He later joined Network 10 where he was a sports producer/presenter and was a host and commentator for major events such as the Commonwealth Games, IPL cricket, AFL and the National Basketball League.

Wingard was cleared of misconduct by Premier Steven Marshall following the report of a private investigator after accusations of bullying and intimidatory behavior by Leah Cassidy, chief executive of Sport SA.

Political offices
Preceded by Stephan Knoll as Minister for Infrastructure, Transport and Local Government	Minister for Infrastructure and Transport; 2020–2022	Succeeded by Tom Koutsantonis
Preceded by Leon Bignell as Minister for Recreation and Sport, and as Minister for Racing	Minister for Recreation, Sport and Racing; 2018–2022	Succeeded by Katrine Hildyard
Preceded by Chris Picton as Minister for Police, Minister for Correctional Services, and as Minister for Emergency Services	Minister for Police, Emergency Services and Correctional Services; 2018–2020	Succeeded by Vincent Tarzia
South Australian House of Assembly
Preceded by Alan Sibbons	Member for Mitchell; 2014–2018	Abolished
New seat	Member for Gibson; 2018–2022	Succeeded by Sarah Andrews
