= Electoral district of Gibson =

South Australian state electoral district

Gibson South Australia—House of Assembly
- Interactive map of electoral district boundaries from the 2022 state election (Note: The electorate will have no change in boundaries at the 2026 state election.)
- State: South Australia
- Created: 2018
- MP: Sarah Andrews
- Party: Labor
- Namesake: Gladys Ruth Gibson CBE (1901–1972)
- Electors: 25,808 (2018)
- Area: 15.1 km^{2} (5.8 sq mi)
- Demographic: Metropolitan
- Coordinates: 35.01°S 138.53°E
Electorates around Gibson:
Gulf St Vincent	Morphett	Badcoe
Gulf St Vincent	Gibson	Elder
Gulf St Vincent	Black	Davenport

Gibson is a single-member electoral district for the South Australian House of Assembly. It was created by the redistribution conducted in 2016, and was contested for the first time at the 2018 state election. It replaced the former seat of Bright.

Gibson lies southwest of the Adelaide city centre and includes the suburbs of Brighton, Dover Gardens, Hove, Marion, North Brighton, Oaklands Park, Seacombe Gardens, South Brighton, Sturt, Warradale and the southern portion of Somerton Park.

Since 2022, Gibson has been represented by Sarah Andrews of the Labor Party.

== Members for Gibson ==
Member	Party	Term
Corey Wingard	Liberal	2018–2022
Sarah Andrews	Labor	2022–present

== Election results ==
2026 South Australian state election: Gibson
Party	Candidate	Votes	%	±%
Labor	Sarah Andrews	8,615	46.9	+7.3
Liberal	Jane Fleming	4,361	23.7	−18.8
One Nation	Zoran Ananijev	2,591	14.1	+14.1
Greens	Mike Trewartha	2,256	12.3	+1.2
Animal Justice	Bin Liu	231	1.3	+1.3
Family First	Darryl Easther	219	1.2	−2.5
Australian Family	Glenn O'Rourke	62	0.3	+0.3
Fair Go	John Lutman	42	0.2	+0.2
Total formal votes		18,377	97.3	
Informal votes		510	2.7	
Turnout		18,887		
Two-party-preferred result
Labor	Sarah Andrews	4,894	67.6	+15.1
Liberal	Jane Fleming	2,347	32.4	−15.1
Labor hold		Swing	+15.1	

Results are not final. Last updated on 22 March at 12:35am ACDT.
