= Westfield Marion =

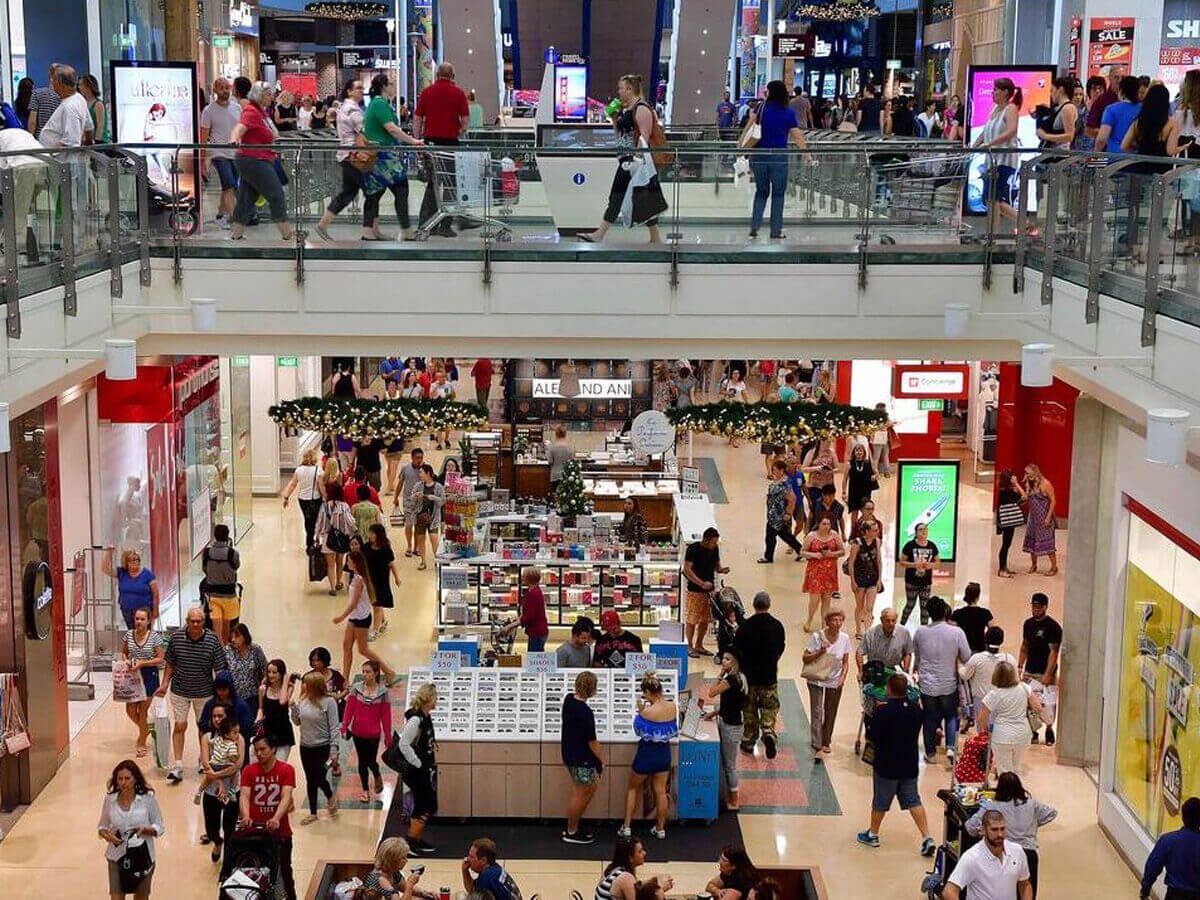
- Westfield Marion interior
- Location: Oaklands Park, South Australia
- Opened: 1968; 58 years ago
- Manager: John O'Loughlin
- Owner: Scentre Group (50%), Paragon REIT (50%)
- Num. of stores: 342
- Num. of anchor tenants: 11
- Floor area: 136,778 m^{2} (1,472,266 sq ft)
- Floors: 4 (Main Complex), 8 (Office Tower)
- Parking: 5,549
- Website: westfield.com.au/marion

Westfield Marion is the largest shopping centre in Adelaide, South Australia. Located in Oaklands Park, it is the eleventh largest shopping centre in Australia, with approximately 342 stores alongside anchor tenants including David Jones, Myer, Harris Scarfe, Target, Kmart, Big W, Woolworths, Coles, Event Cinemas, Aldi and Rebel Sport. The centre's Event Cinema complex is the Southern Hemisphere's largest cinema complex, featuring 26 screens. The centre houses all of Westfield's management in Adelaide, located in an 8-storey office block to the east of the centre, as well as services including; legal, child care, health and dental clinic. It also houses the head office for Fellas Gifts. The office tower is located at the original mall where the food court is facing Diagonal Road. The South Australia Aquatic and Leisure Centre is also a part of Westfield Marion; located on the northern side of the site after its opening in April 2011.

== History ==
Westfield Marion was built in 1968 on a large expanse of land bordered by Sturt, Diagonal and Morphett Roads, and has seen extensions in 1982, 1989, 1997 and 2016. The 1997 extension saw the centre expand to a floorspace of roughly 119,000 m^{2}.

Westfield Marion achieved major Australian firsts upon redevelopment in 1997 as the first shopping centre to have all three department stores present in South Australia at the time, (David Jones, Harris Scarfe and Myer) as well as all three discount department stores (Big W, Kmart and Target).

In November 2019 Paragon REIT purchased Australian Prime Property Fund's 50% stake.

In November 2026, David Jones announced that their store in the centre would close after the 2026 holiday season alongside 18 other stores as a result of their entrance into administration.

== Incidents and accidents ==
In June 2024, a group of teens started fighting; expandable batons were reportedly used. It has been reported that the fighting was over stealing a hoodie from a different teen. Marion shopping centre was put into lockdown amid fears of a recent incident that took place in after the Bondi Junction stabbings a few months earlier at Westfield Bondi Junction.
