= Warradale, South Australia =

Warradale
- Suburb
- Country: Australia
- State: South Australia
- City: Adelaide
- LGA: City of Marion

Government
  - State electorate: Gibson
  - Federal division: Boothby

Population
  - Total: 5,801 (SAL 2021)
- Postcode: 5046

Warradale is a suburb of Adelaide in the City of Marion. The name Warradale derives from Warripari, an Aboriginal (Kaurna) word for windy place by the (Sturt) River. The suburb is located in the south western part of Adelaide, approximately 12 kilometres from the CBD, and is serviced by the Seaford-Tonsley train line and several main roads.

== History ==
When three residents of Oaklands applied for a post office in January 1917, the postal authorities pointed out that the use of the name Oaklands was likely to be confused with both Oaklands on Yorke Peninsula and in New South Wales. The name Warradale was then submitted by local residents and accepted by the PMG Department, (but not so agreeably by the council).

== See also ==
- List of Adelaide suburbs
