= Electoral results for the district of Morphett =

South Australian district election results

This is a list of electoral results for the Electoral district of Morphett in South Australian state elections.

== Members for Morphett ==
Member	Party	Term
Terry Groom	Labor	1977–1979
John Oswald	Liberal	1979–2002
Duncan McFetridge	Liberal	2002–2017
Duncan McFetridge	Independent	2017–2018
Stephen Patterson	Liberal	2018–present

== Election results ==
=== Elections in the 2020s ===
==== 2026 ====
2026 South Australian state election: Morphett
Party	Candidate	Votes	%	±%
Labor	Toby Priest	8,052	35.9	+0.3
Liberal	Stephen Patterson	7,857	35.1	−16.6
One Nation	Tim March	3,413	15.2	+15.2
Greens	Isabella Litt	2,303	10.3	−2.4
Animal Justice	Ren Ryba	288	1.3	+1.3
Australian Family	Craig Attard	274	1.2	+1.2
Real Change	Tim Birdseye	155	0.7	+0.7
Fair Go	Maria Ruta	72	0.3	+0.3
Total formal votes		22,414	96.3	−1.2
Informal votes		837	3.7	+1.2
Turnout		23,281	89.3	+0.5
Two-candidate-preferred result
Labor	Toby Priest	11,360	50.7	+5.2
Liberal	Stephen Patterson	11,054	49.3	−5.2
Labor gain from Liberal		Swing	+5.2	

==== 2022 ====
2022 South Australian state election: Morphett
Party	Candidate	Votes	%	±%
Liberal	Stephen Patterson	11,730	51.7	+8.4
Labor	Cameron Hurst	8,086	35.6	+10.0
Greens	Autumn Slavin	2,881	12.7	+7.3
Total formal votes		22,697	97.5	
Informal votes		583	2.5	
Turnout		23,280	88.8	
Two-party-preferred result
Liberal	Stephen Patterson	12,380	54.5	−6.4
Labor	Cameron Hurst	10,317	45.5	+6.4
Liberal hold		Swing	−6.4	

Distribution of preferences: Morphett
Party	Candidate	Votes	Round 1	
Party	Candidate	Votes	Dist.	Total
Quota (50% + 1)		11,349		
Liberal	Stephen Patterson	11,730	+650	12,380
Labor	Cameron Hurst	8,086	+2,231	10,317
Greens	Autumn Slavin	2,881	Excluded	

=== Elections in the 2010s ===
==== 2018 ====
2018 South Australian state election: Morphett
Party	Candidate	Votes	%	±%
Liberal	Stephen Patterson	9,576	41.4	−11.1
Labor	Mark Siebentritt	5,929	25.6	−7.1
Independent	Duncan McFetridge	3,288	14.2	+14.2
SA-Best	Simon Jones	2,790	12.1	+12.1
Greens	Chris Crabbe	1,187	5.1	−4.9
Dignity	Monica Kwan	379	1.6	+1.0
Total formal votes		23,149	96.7	−0.2
Informal votes		785	3.3	+0.2
Turnout		23,934	90.7	+2.4
Two-party-preferred result
Liberal	Stephen Patterson	13,998	60.5	+2.6
Labor	Mark Siebentritt	9,151	39.5	−2.6
Liberal hold		Swing	+2.6	

2014 South Australian state election: Morphett
Party	Candidate	Votes	%	±%
Liberal	Duncan McFetridge	12,164	57.7	+3.1
Labor	Tim Looker	5,973	28.3	−3.7
Greens	Matthew Carey	2,128	10.1	+0.9
Family First	Bob Randall	808	3.8	+0.3
Total formal votes		21,073	97.5	−0.3
Informal votes		547	2.5	+0.3
Turnout		21,620	91.1	−1.3
Two-party-preferred result
Liberal	Duncan McFetridge	13,264	62.9	+2.4
Labor	Tim Looker	7,809	37.1	−2.4
Liberal hold		Swing	+2.4	

2010 South Australian state election: Morphett
Party	Candidate	Votes	%	±%
Liberal	Duncan McFetridge	11,660	55.4	+8.1
Labor	Tim Looker	6,595	31.3	−6.6
Greens	Jack Robins	1,993	9.5	+2.1
Family First	Helen Zafiriou	807	3.8	−0.5
Total formal votes		21,055	97.8	
Informal votes		479	2.4	
Turnout		21,534	92.5	
Two-party-preferred result
Liberal	Duncan McFetridge	12,856	61.1	+7.6
Labor	Tim Looker	8,199	38.9	−7.6
Liberal hold		Swing	+7.6	

=== Elections in the 2000s ===
2006 South Australian state election: Morphett
Party	Candidate	Votes	%	±%
Liberal	Duncan McFetridge	10,385	49.2	−5.4
Labor	Tim Looker	7,604	36.0	+5.0
Greens	Damien Uern	1,594	7.6	+2.4
Family First	John Ewers	868	4.1	+4.1
Democrats	Keryn Hassall	649	3.1	−4.1
Total formal votes		21,100	97.4	−0.6
Informal votes		559	2.6	+0.6
Turnout		21,659	92.2	−1.3
Two-party-preferred result
Liberal	Duncan McFetridge	11,686	55.4	−4.6
Labor	Tim Looker	9,414	44.6	+4.6
Liberal hold		Swing	−4.6	

2002 South Australian state election: Morphett
Party	Candidate	Votes	%	±%
Liberal	Duncan McFetridge	11,731	54.6	+1.2
Labor	Rosemary Clancy	6,659	31.0	+3.0
Democrats	Ben Howieson	1,544	7.2	−10.9
Greens	Adam MacLeod	1,119	5.2	+5.2
One Nation	Peter Fitzpatrick	414	1.9	+1.9
Total formal votes		21,467	98.0	
Informal votes		447	2.0	
Turnout		21,914	93.5	
Two-party-preferred result
Liberal	Duncan McFetridge	12,889	60.0	−1.9
Labor	Rosemary Clancy	8,578	40.0	+1.9
Liberal hold		Swing	−1.9	

=== Elections in the 1990s ===
1997 South Australian state election: Morphett
Party	Candidate	Votes	%	±%
Liberal	John Oswald	10,069	54.8	−11.2
Labor	Stephen Graney	5,002	27.2	+4.3
Democrats	Danny Carroll	3,313	18.0	+10.6
Total formal votes		18,384	96.5	−0.8
Informal votes		659	3.5	+0.8
Turnout		19,043	90.2	
Two-party-preferred result
Liberal	John Oswald	11,591	63.0	−9.4
Labor	Stephen Graney	6,793	37.0	+9.4
Liberal hold		Swing	−9.4	

1993 South Australian state election: Morphett
Party	Candidate	Votes	%	±%
Liberal	John Oswald	12,523	65.3	+11.2
Labor	Ronald Williams	4,497	23.5	−12.0
Democrats	Michael Morphett	1,405	7.3	−2.7
Natural Law	Andrew Reimer	424	2.2	+2.2
Call to Australia	Howard Martin	326	1.7	+1.5
Total formal votes		19,175	97.3	−0.9
Informal votes		539	2.7	+0.9
Turnout		19,714	92.4	
Two-party-preferred result
Liberal	John Oswald	13,781	71.9	+12.7
Labor	Ronald Williams	5,394	28.1	−12.7
Liberal hold		Swing	+12.7	

=== Elections in the 1980s ===
1989 South Australian state election: Morphett
Party	Candidate	Votes	%	±%
Liberal	John Oswald	9,364	55.1	+2.4
Labor	Trevor Peikert	5,917	34.8	−8.2
Democrats	Rosalina Bouchee	1,724	10.1	+5.8
Total formal votes		17,005	98.2	+0.9
Informal votes		318	1.8	−0.9
Turnout		17,323	93.6	−0.2
Two-party-preferred result
Liberal	John Oswald	10,199	60.0	+5.3
Labor	Trevor Peikert	6,806	40.0	−5.3
Liberal hold		Swing	+5.3	

1985 South Australian state election: Morphett
Party	Candidate	Votes	%	±%
Liberal	John Oswald	8,987	52.7	−2.3
Labor	Trevor Peikert	7,329	43.0	+3.0
Democrats	Sue Carver	725	4.3	−0.7
Total formal votes		17,041	97.3	
Informal votes		476	2.7	
Turnout		17,517	93.8	
Two-party-preferred result
Liberal	John Oswald	9,318	54.7	−2.3
Labor	Trevor Peikert	7,723	45.3	+2.3
Liberal hold		Swing	−2.3	

1982 South Australian state election: Morphett
Party	Candidate	Votes	%	±%
Liberal	John Oswald	7,346	49.1	−2.7
Labor	Stephen Blight	6,888	46.1	+3.8
Democrats	Graham Pamount	721	4.8	−1.1
Total formal votes		14,955	95.1	−1.6
Informal votes		764	4.9	+1.6
Turnout		15,719	92.5	−1.2
Two-party-preferred result
Liberal	John Oswald	7,696	51.5	−3.8
Labor	Stephen Blight	7,259	48.5	+3.8
Liberal hold		Swing	−3.8	

=== Elections in the 1970s ===
1979 South Australian state election: Morphett
Party	Candidate	Votes	%	±%
Liberal	John Oswald	7,959	51.8	+7.8
Labor	Terry Groom	6,497	42.3	−5.2
Democrats	Elizabeth Topperwien	910	5.9	−2.6
Total formal votes		15,366	96.7	−1.3
Informal votes		525	3.3	+1.3
Turnout		15,891	93.7	+0.5
Two-party-preferred result
Liberal	John Oswald	8,499	55.3	+5.7
Labor	Terry Groom	6,867	44.7	−5.7
Liberal gain from Labor		Swing	+5.7	

1977 South Australian state election: Morphett
Party	Candidate	Votes	%	±%
Labor	Terry Groom	7,581	47.5	+5.2
Liberal	Mark Hamilton	7,026	44.0	+5.3
Democrats	Margaret Sesr	1,361	8.5	+8.5
Total formal votes		15,968	98.0	
Informal votes		333	2.0	
Turnout		16,301	93.2	
Two-party-preferred result
Labor	Terry Groom	8,040	50.3	+5.2
Liberal	Mark Hamilton	7,928	49.7	−5.2
Labor gain from Liberal		Swing	+5.2	
