= George Strickland Kingston =

Irish-Australian surveyor and politician (1807–1880)

Sir George Strickland Kingston
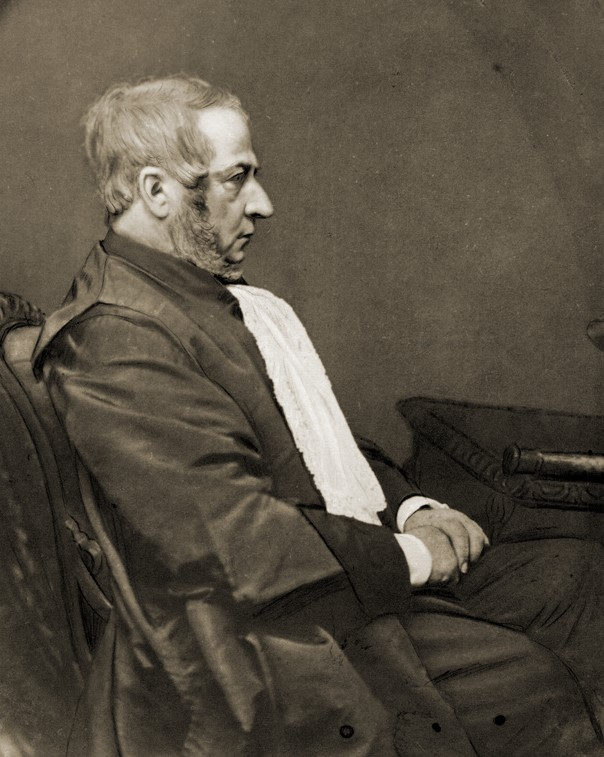

1st & 3rd Speaker of the South Australian House of Assembly
- In office 22 April 1857 – 22 April 1860
- Preceded by: Office established
- Succeeded by: Charles Hawker
- In office 31 March 1865 – 26 November 1880
- Preceded by: Charles Hawker
- Succeeded by: Robert Ross

Member of the South Australian House of Assembly for Stanley
- In office 25 November 1862 – 26 November 1880

Member of the South Australian House of Assembly for The Burra and Clare
- In office 9 March 1857 – 22 March 1860
- In office 6 May 1861 – 25 November 1862

Elected Member of the South Australian Legislative Council for The Burra
- In office 10 July 1851 – 2 February 1857

Personal details
- Born: 23 August 1807 Bandon, County Cork, Ireland
- Died: 26 November 1880 (aged 73) aboard the RMS Malwa on his way to India
- Resting place: Buried at sea
- Spouse(s): Henrietta Ann McDonough (1807–1839), Ludovina Catherina da Silva Cameron (1824–1851), Emma Mary Ann Catherine Berry Lipson (1816–1876)
- Children: Ludovina Cameron Kingston, b. 16 March 1842; Hester Holland Kingston, b. 30 October 1843; Charlotte Julian Kingston, b. 11 September 1845; George John Finnis Kingston, b. 26 May 1847; Strickland Gough Kingston, b. 18 December 1848; Charles Cameron Kingston, b. 22 October 1850
- Parents: George Kingston (father); Hester Holland (mother)
- Occupation: Surveyor, civil engineer, architect

Sir George Strickland Kingston (23 August 1807 – 26 November 1880) was the Deputy Surveyor to William Light, engaged to survey the new colony of South Australia. He arrived in South Australia on the Cygnet in 1836. Kingston was also the first Speaker of the South Australian House of Assembly.

== Early life ==
Kingston was born in Bandon, County Cork, Ireland, one of five children of George Kingston and Hester Holland. Strickland's father owned a lumberyard, a tenement (Kingston Buildings), and was credited with being involved in the three canal plans for Bandon. Strickland immigrated to England and was employed in Birmingham in 1832. He subsequently took an active part in promoting the South Australian Act in 1834 and helped to lobby successfully for its passage through the House of Commons.

== Deputy Surveyor, South Australia Colony ==
Kingston was appointed deputy surveyor to the new province and sailed with most of the surveying party in the Cygnet in March 1836. Because he detoured to Rio de Janeiro for supplies the Cygnet did not arrive at Nepean Bay until 11 September 1836, nearly a month after Colonel William Light, who was therefore left short-handed at a critical time. However it was Kingston, John Morphett and Lieutenant W.G. Field who found the River Torrens.

Kingston's ability as a surveyor was frequently questioned and his lack of qualifications and blunders in the survey of Adelaide caused Light to have some of his work re-surveyed by Assistant Surveyors Boyle Travers Finniss and George Owen Ormsby. Completion of the survey of the city was delayed for a fortnight because of his mistakes. However it was he who was spared to return to England in August 1837 to ask for reinforcements for the Survey Department. The colonisation commissioners sent him back next June with orders unpalatable to Light, who resigned with all but three of his staff. Kingston resigned soon after Governor George Gawler's arrival in October 1838 and Ormsby, "one of the best, if not the very best, on the staff of Col. Light", was put in temporary charge of the survey, with directions 'to proceed with the utmost despatch'.

== Later career ==
Kingston established himself as a civil engineer, architect and surveyor, and in 1840 the Adelaide Municipal Council briefly engaged him as town surveyor. He was later engaged as inspector of public works and, buildings. Among his works still standing are the south-eastern corner of Government House (1839), the original section of the Adelaide Gaol (1840), Cummins House at Camden Park (1841) and Kingston Historical House (1840, 1851). He also designed the first monument to Colonel Light in Light Square (1843). He designed White's Rooms, Adelaide's first public entertainment venue.

On 10 July 1851, Kingston was sworn in as an elected member of South Australia's first elected parliament representing the Electoral District of The Burra and Clare in the Legislative Council. He was re-elected in September 1855 and held the position until the Council's dissolution on 2 February 1857. On 9 March 1857, Kingston was elected to the newly established House of Assembly and became the first Speaker on 22 April 1857. Kingston held this position until 22 March 1860 and again from 31 March 1865 until his death on 26 November 1880. Kingston represented The Burra and Clare from 9 March 1857 to 22 March 1860 and Stanley from 6 May 1861 until his death.

Kingston was prominent in forming the South Australian Mining Association to keep the mineral wealth of the colony from overseas speculators. With Edward Stephens, he investigated copper finds at Burra in 1845, and then played a leading role in the 'snobs' party to defeat the 'nobs' for the mine. An original shareholder, he was appointed surveyor and architect of the mining association but it was William Jacob who carried out the Burra special survey of 20,000 acres (8094 ha). In April 1848 he was elected a director, deputy-chairman in October 1856 and chairman from 1857 until his death. In its first five years the 'monster mine' paid fifteen dividends each of 200 per cent.

In 1858 Kingston was part of the team who surveyed the namesake town of Kingston, later renamed Kingston SE as a part of a private real estate development.

On 30 April 1870, Kingston was made a Knight of the United Kingdom of Great Britain and Ireland by Queen Victoria. He died in 1880 aboard the RMS Malwa on his way to India and was buried at sea.

== Other interests ==
Kingston was interested in the Volunteer movement and was once captain of the East Adelaide Rifles. He was also a founding member and later Master of The South Australian Lodge of Friendship and of the Statistical Society, keeping a valuable register of Adelaide's rainfall from 1839–1879. Kingston was also one of the founding members of the Freemasons South Australian Lodge of Friendship No. 613 (under a Warrant or Charter of Constitution which was issued at Adelphi, London, England on 22 October 1834). The original Lodge to which Kingston belonged was Irish Lodge No 81. Kingston was the first Senior Warden of the new South Australian Lodge and on 14 August 1838, Kingston was elected Master. He was a member of the Agricultural and Horticultural Society and its president from 1859 to 1860.

== Personal life ==
Kingston married three times, being widowed in his first two marriages. He married his first wife Henrietta Ann McDonough in 1829; she died ten years later and their only child died soon after childbirth. Six children were born to his second wife, Ludovina Catherina da Silva Cameron (daughter of soldier Charles Cameron (1779–1827)), after their marriage on 10 April 1841. She died ten years later and Kingston married widow Emma Lipson (1816–1876), daughter of Thomas Lipson R.N., South Australia's first harbourmaster, on 4 December 1856 (no children resulted from this marriage).

- His youngest daughter, Charlotte Julian Kingston (11 September 1845 – 20 May 1913) married Hubert Giles (21 October 1842 – 11 August 1901), son of William Giles, on 17 March 1880.
- Strickland Gough "Pat" Kingston (1848–1897) married Kathleen Pittar Stanton in 1879. In 1894 she founded Yoothamurra School in Glenelg.
- His youngest son, Charles Cameron Kingston (22 October 1850 – 11 May 1908) was Premier of South Australia from 1893 to 1899.

== Memorials ==
Kingston's name has been applied to the following places in South Australia - Hundred of Kingston, Mount Kingston near Lake Eyre, Kingston Park (a suburb of Adelaide) and the township of Kingston SE. The township of Kingston-on-Murray was named after his son, Sir Charles Cameron Kingston.

== List of buildings attributed to Sir George Strickland Kingston ==
- Ayers House, Adelaide
- Old Adelaide Gaol, Adelaide
- Original Treasury Building, Victoria Square, Adelaide
- Government House, Adelaide
- Customs House, Glenelg
- Cummins House, 23 Sheoak Avenue, Novar Gardens, South Australia
- Colonel William Light Monument, Light Square, Adelaide (demolished 1905)
- Kingston Historical House, Brighton
- Lochend House, Campbelltown, the home of Charles James Fox Campbell
- Residential Cottage Home, 3 Market Street, Burra
- Sir George Kingston Building, University of South Australia, City West campus
