= South Australian Lodge of Friendship =

Freemasonry in South Australia

The Province of South Australia was established by an Act of the British Parliament and was assented to by King William IV on 15 August 1834. Freemasonry became included in the plans for the proposed new settlement with the establishment of a new Lodge in England. On 22 October 1834, the South Australian Lodge of Friendship, No 613 E.C. was warranted and met in London for the first time on 27 November.

South Australia became a legal and political entity on 19 February 1836 when letters patent proclaiming its boundaries were officially sealed. The first ships carrying colonists for the new settlement left England that same month, arriving in July. The establishment of the province was proclaimed at Glenelg in South Australia on 28 December 1836. On one of those ships was Brother GS Kingston who carried The Lodge Warrant or charter and later presented it at the first meeting of the lodge in the new colony of South Australia. Each year since the proclamation of South Australia at the old Gum tree in Glenelg, a re-enactment of the ceremony has been held with the current Master of The Lodge of Friendship invariably being in attendance.

Those first colonists arriving in South Australia in 1836 lived in scattered tents or portable dwellings until permanent structures could be erected and it was because of this lack of facilities that the lodge did not hold its first meeting in the colony until 1838.

== Meetings in London ==
As authorized the Lodge held its first meeting at the rooms of the South Australian Association, 7 John Street, Adelphi, London on 27 November 1834. Those present were Bros. WH White and Edward Harper, Grand Secretaries, Bro. Francis Crew, WM No. 1 Lodge, Bro. Richard H Giran, WM of a Lodge not given, Bros. Geo. Aaron, Chas. Mawley, Arthur Hardy, JF Taylor, GS Kingston, Col. Leslie Walker, B Breakfit, and R Doig.

After the Lodge had been opened by Bro WH White, VW Grand Secretary (acting as WM), the usual petition for forming a new Lodge was read, to which the seven following brethren promised obedience:

Joseph Francis Taylor – Old King's Arms Lodge No.30, G.Master's Lodge No.1 and Hereford Lodge No. 578 GS Kingston, Irish Lodge No 81 Capt. Walter Meriton – Phoenix Lodge, Portsmouth, No.375, & Lodge 227 of the 46th Regiment, RA and KM Col. Leslie Walker, CA CB and KH, of Bombay Lodge EG Hancock – Lodge 259 Romford Lieut. Jackson – Renford Lodge, Sutta, also of the 94th Regiment Lodge, and R Doig – Lodge 24, Newcastle upon Tyne.

Bro. Joseph Francis Taylor was installed as first Master, and he appointed and invested Bro. GS Kingston as first Senior Warden, and Bro. Col. Leslie Walker as first Junior Warden.

The following five men were then elected to become members of Free Masonry: John Morphett, Richard Hanson, Thomas Gilbert, Robert Gouger, and Daniel Wakefield with John Morphett, Richard Hanson and Thomas Gilbert being initiated into the craft later in the same meeting.

The second meeting of the Lodge was held at the same place in London on 2 March 1835. Bro. A Hardy was appointed Inner Guard and Bros. Morphett, Hanson and Gilbert were passed to the Second Degree.

== South Australia ==
The Lodge Warrant or Charter was brought to South Australia by Bro. GS Kingston, who presented the Warrant at the first meeting held in South Australia, the third meeting of the Lodge. This meeting took place in Adelaide on 11 August 1838 at the Assembly Rooms, Black's Hotel, Franklin Street (later the site of Rosetta Terrace). Bro H Mildred PM presided, and the nine other brethren present were PMs EB Gleeson, Gordon, Allen and J Gleeson, the SW Bro. GS Kingston, and Bros. Beare, Morphett, Gilbert and Solomon. Bro. Morphett was raised to the degree of MM and Bro GS Kingston was nominated for the office of Master. Three days later a Lodge of Emergency was called on 14 August, when Bro. Kingston was installed as Master.

The fifth meeting of the Lodge was in November 1838. It seems this meeting was held at the Turf Hotel in Waymouth Street. Mr Chas. Mann (lawyer) and Mr Chas. Berkeley (gentleman) were elected and initiated. Capt. Finnis was elected and initiated at the following meeting.

For the first few years Bros. Kingston and Mildred alternated as Master of the Lodge.

Several notable events occurred in 1841. First, a notice appeared in the newspaper the South Australian Register of 31 March 1841 as follows:

The Free and Accepted Masons of The SA Lodge of Friendship No.613 are about to bespeak an evening's entertainment at the Theatre for the benefit of the Hospital. The Masons will appear in their Masonic costumes, and the ladies of their families will wear light blue ribands and aprons, so that the house will have a very novel and imposing appearance, and it is hoped that it may prove a benefit, to enable the members to present a very handsome donation to that very valuable institution.

The evening of entertainment took place on Tuesday 13 April 1841. There was a crowded house. The handsome sum of £30/3/0 was raised for the benefit of the Adelaide Hospital. The second notable event of 1841 occurred in August. His Excellency the Governor of South Australia, Bro. George Grey, a member of Irish Military Lodge No.83, was elected a joining member of The Lodge of Friendship.

St John's Day, 27 December, was celebrated in 1842 by a dinner held at the Shakespeare Tavern from 5 o'clock. All Freemasons were invited to attend, tickets priced at 7s. 6d. each, including half a bottle of wine.

The Lodge changed meeting place in 1843, to Lambert's auction room, Hindley Street.

== New lodges ==
1844 proved a busy year for the Lodge. On 31 January the Lodge met at the rear of the Freemason's Tavern in Pirie Street. Bro. E Solomon generously offered the Lodge a quarter of an acre of land for Masonic purposes and 10,000 bricks with which to build a Lodge room (it is not known whether a room was built or not). At this meeting it was reported that seven Scottish Masons had attempted to form a Lodge (to be called the Adelaide St. John's Lodge) in a manner which, it was stated, was contrary to the usages of the Craft, and had initiated twenty new members. The Lodge of Friendship proposed a way out of a difficult situation by accepting a petition from the seven members of the new Lodge, and the following day, 1 February 1844, met again, this time at the Port Lincoln Hotel in Adelaide, to consecrate the new Lodge which later obtained a Warrant from the Grand Lodge of Scotland. On 3 February the two Lodges together laid the foundation stone of a Scottish Church in Grenfell Street. Several days later, on 6 February 1844, several brethren petitioned The Lodge of Friendship for a Dispensation to form a new Lodge under the English Constitution, to be called the Lodge of Harmony. The new Lodge was consecrated on 9 February, eight days after the Adelaide St John's Lodge. The final major happening was on 20 November 1844 when a Memorial was sent to the MW Grand Master of the United Grand Lodge of England, requesting the appointment of a Provincial Grand Lodge in South Australia and recommending Bro. Mildred as first Provincial Grand Master.

In the first ten years of its existence The South Australian Lodge of Friendship No. 613 had some notable achievements. After its foundation in London, the Lodge had removed to a small fledgling settlement on the opposite side of the globe, attracted new members, and contributed to the new society by promoting charity and assisting in the formation of two new Lodges.

In 1884 The Lodge of Friendship, along with other Lodges that had become warranted in South Australia, co-operated to form the Grand Lodge of South Australia, with The Lodge of Friendship returning its original warrant and becoming The Lodge of Friendship No. 1 under the new Grand Lodge.

The Lodge of Friendship No. 1 still exists in Adelaide, the capital of South Australia, and has operated continuously since those early days.
