= Cummins House, Adelaide =

Historic house in Adelaide, Australia

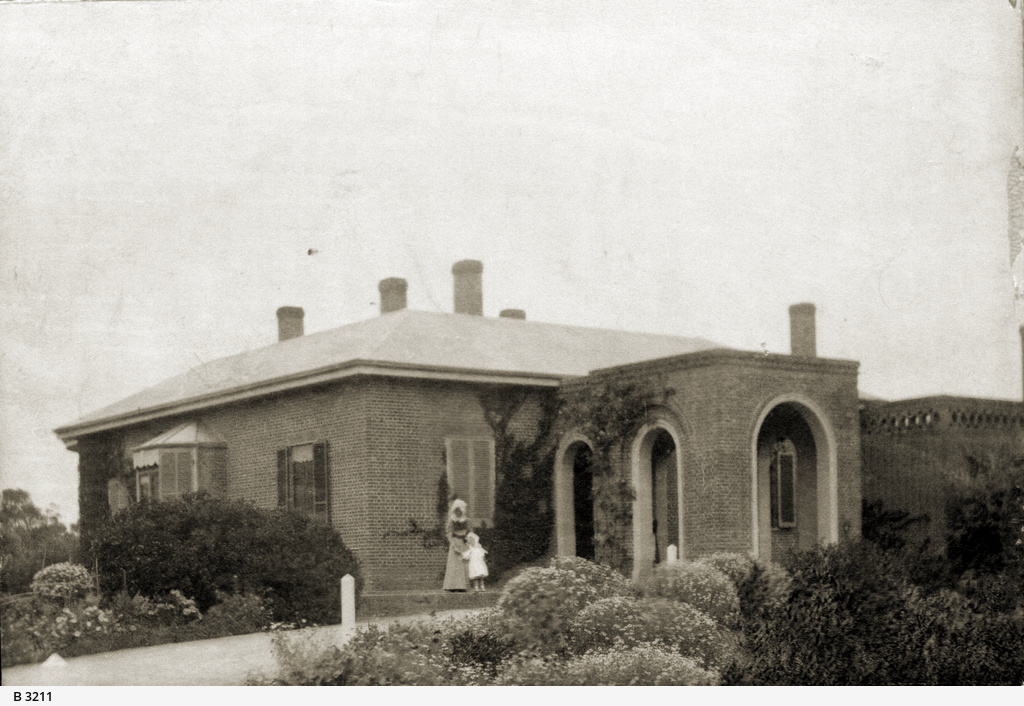
Cummins House, front, ca. 1900

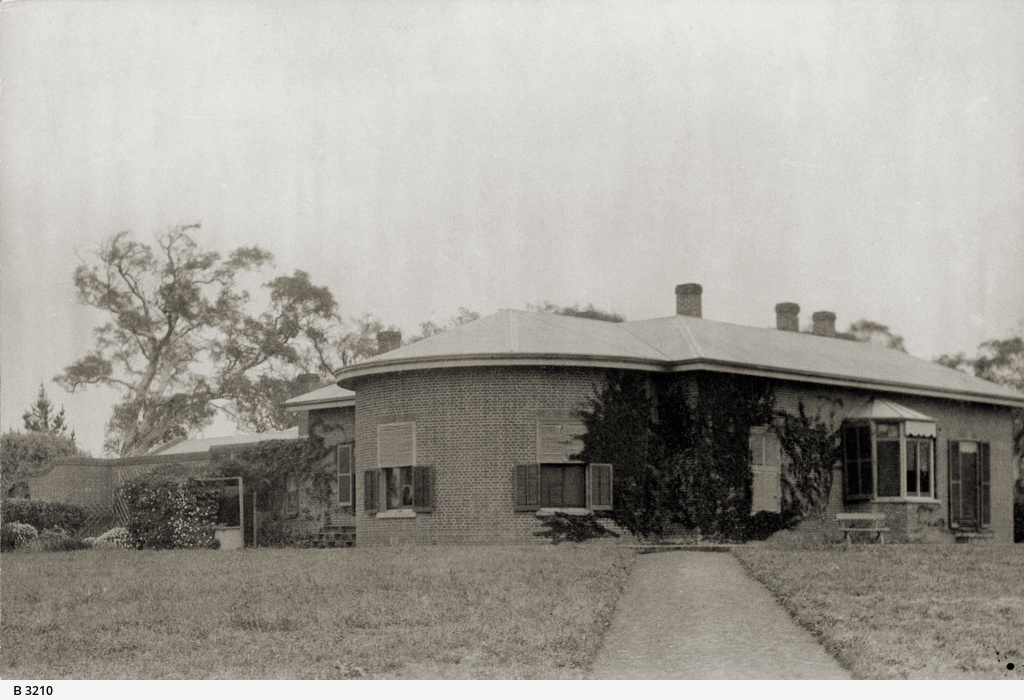
Cummins House, rear, ca. 1900

Cummins House is a historic house in Adelaide, situated at 19-23 Sheoak Avenue, Novar Gardens. It was listed on the South Australian Heritage Register on 24 July 1980.

It is now managed as a museum with guided tours by the Cummins Society.

== History ==
On 15 May 1838, John Morphett used his preliminary land order to buy 134 acres of land bounded by Pine Avenue, Anzac Highway and Morphett Road, near the present Morphettville race course. On 13 January 1840, he was granted title to the land which he named "Cummins Estate" after his mother's Devonshire farm. He kept sheep and cows, planted fruit trees, vines and olive groves, and cultivated a variety of local and imported trees. A horse lover, he also kept a stud and was involved in racing. (He was one of the original directors of the Morphettville Racing Club, founded in 1847).

Morphett's home, Cummins House, was designed by architect George Kingston. It was sited on the Sturt River and begun in 1842 as a five roomed red brick cottage. It was extended considerably in 1854, and there were further extensions in 1906, 1945, 1977 and 1983.

The fourth generation owner, Hurtle Morphett, offered this residence and land for sale but a satisfactory purchaser was not forthcoming. To ensure that the home would be saved, the SA Government purchased the house on the remaining 1.68 acres in 1977. In 1982, Immanuel College leased Cummins from the State Government, with the aim of restoring the property for use as a pioneer museum, and as an exhibition and performance centre. The lease was for 5 years. With the assistance of the Cummins Society, the West Torrens Historical Society, and the National Trust, the school spent about $30,000 a year on the restoration of the house from an empty shell. At the end of the lease period, the State government offered the lease to the West Torrens Council, who agreed to take charge of the property "under certain conditions".

== Subdivisions ==
In 1919, the first sub-division occurred when land south of the Holdfast Bay railway line was sold for a new subdivision for returned servicemen's homes. In 1921, the area, which also included that part of Cummins Estate where Cummins House is located, was renamed to Novar Gardens to honour Viscount Novar, (who as Sir Ronald Munro Ferguson was the sixth Governor-General of Australia from 1914 to 1920). Hence, Cummins House is located at 23 Sheoak Avenue, Novar Gardens, South Australia.

A large section of the property was purchased by Immanuel College in 1949. The remaining 32 acres were held until 1963, when ~30 acres, often referred to as "Cummins Park", were sold for housing, leaving 1.68 acres containing the home and the outbuildings.

== Timeline of Cummins House ==
From	To	Owners/Lessees/Occupants/events
	1836	John Morphett arrived in South Australia
	1838	(15 May) John Morphett bought 132 acres of land by the Sturt Creek which he named "Cummins Estate"
	1838	(15 August) John married Elizabeth Fisher
1842	1870	The 5 roomed "Cummins House" was completed and occupied by Mr & Mrs John Morphett and family
	1854	Extensive additions to house completed
1870	1892	(John Morphett knighted.) House occupied by Sir John & Lady Elizabeth Morphett and family
	1880	Holdfast Bay railway line bisects area between Sturt Creek and Anzac Highway
1892	1905	(Sir John died.) House occupied by Lady Elizabeth Morphett and family
1905	1936	(Lady Elizabeth died.) House occupied by Mr & Mrs John Cummins Morphett and family
	1906	Further extensions
	1919	First subdivision. Land between Railway line and Anzac Highway sold for a new subdivision for returned servicemen's homes.
	1921	Part of Morphettville renamed Novar Gardens
	1936	John Cummins Morphett died
?	1963	House occupied by Mr & Mrs George Cummins Morphett and family
	1949	A large portion of Cummins Estate sold to Immanuel College, leaving 32 acres (of the original 132 acres)
	1963	(George Cummins Morphett died.) ~30 acres sold for Housing, leaving 1.68 acres
?	1977	House occupied by Mr & Mrs Hurtle Cummins Morphett and family
1977	1982	Property purchased by South Australian State Government
1982	1987	Property leased by Immanuel College. Restoration commences
1984	Ongoing	The Cummins Society established who run regular guided tours on the first and third Sunday of each month (February to November) with Devonshire tea, and who also maintain the property's gardens
1987	2019	State Government offered the lease to the West Torrens Council, who agreed to take charge of the property "under certain conditions"
2019	Ongoing	The West Torrens Council elected not to enter into a new lease agreement with the State Government, and instead it has been offered to The Cummins Society, whose charter is to preserve the heritage character of the property and to run regular open days when public can visit.
