= Glengowrie, South Australia =

Glengowrie
- Suburb
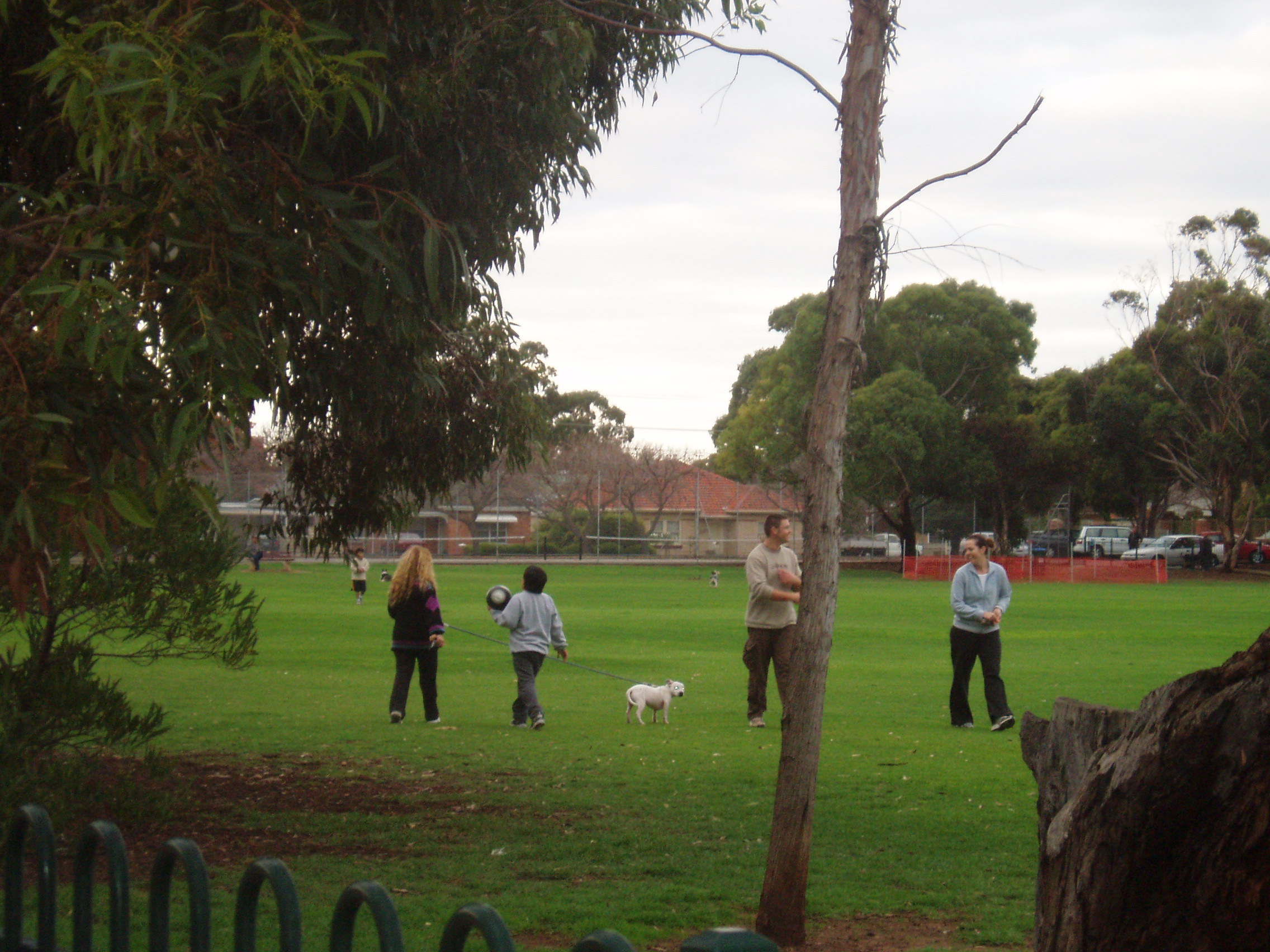
- Hazelmere Reserve on the south-eastern boundary of Glengowrie

- Country: Australia
- State: South Australia
- City: Adelaide
- LGA: City of Marion

Government
  - State electorate: Morphett
  - Federal division: Boothby

Area
  - Total: 1.9 km^{2} (0.73 sq mi)

Population
  - Total: 5,767 (SAL 2021)
- Postcode: 5044
Suburbs around Glengowrie
Glenelg East	Glenelg East	Camden Park
Glenelg East	Glengowrie	Morphettville
Somerton Park	Warradale	Oaklands Park

Glengowrie (/ɡlɛnˈɡaʊri/) is a suburb of the Australian city of Adelaide, approximately 12 kilometres south west of the city centre. The name Glengowrie means "Glen of Gowrie", so called in honour of Lord Gowrie (formerly, Alexander Gore Arkwright Hore-Ruthven), Governor-General of Australia from 1936 to 1944.

== Location ==
Located in the City of Marion, Glengowrie is bounded by the Glenelg tram line to the north, Morphett Road to the east, Oaklands Road to the south and parts of Diagonal Road, Panton Crescent and Buttrose Street to the west. The western tip of Glengowrie is approximately 2 kilometres from the beaches of Glenelg, one of Adelaide's best known beachside precincts.

Glengowrie was first created as a housing subdivision in 1936, advertised as "the New Centenary Suburb" (1936 being the centenary year of the founding of the Colony of South Australia in 1836). The original subdivision comprised only four streets, Maxwell Terrace (the Glenelg tram line), Butler Crescent, Winston Crescent and Fisk Avenue. The area had previously been land owned by the prominent pastoralist Hawker family. In 1940, the subdivision was expanded.

The suburb occupies an area of 1.9 km^{2}.

== Demography ==
The suburb's population at the 2021 census was approximately 5,767, of which slightly more than half (53.3%) were female. Around 20.0% of the suburb's residents were born overseas, with the five largest groups originating from England (6.2%), South Africa (1.0%), Scotland (1.0%), India (0.8%), and the New Zealand (0.7%). The most common languages other than English spoken at home were Greek (0.9%), Mandarin (0.7%), Spanish (0.6%), Italian (0.6%) and Hindi (0.5%).

There were 2,348 occupied private dwellings in the suburb, including: 1,370 separate houses, 893 semi-detached, 71 flats or apartments, and 3 'other'. Approximately 36.9% of occupied private dwellings were fully owned, 36.2% were owned with a mortgage and 21.7% were rented. The median weekly household income was $1,874, compared with $1,548 in Adelaide overall.

== Governance ==
Glengowrie falls under the local-level governance of the City of Marion. It lies in the state electoral district of Morphett and the federal electoral division of Hindmarsh.

== Amenities ==
- The Hazelmere Reserve is a public park on the southern edge of Glengowrie. It features the popular fenced off area known as "Dog Park" which is typically filled with dogs and their owners late in the afternoon and on weekends. The reserve is located on the site of the oval of the former Glengowrie High School.
- The Glengowrie Tram Depot houses the trams (launched in 1927) which service Adelaide's only remaining tramline from Adelaide to Glenelg.
- The Sturt River Linear Park is a trail which follows the Sturt River through the south-western metropolitan area from Marion to Glenelg. It crosses through the north-eastern tip of Glengowrie at site of Glenelg East Reserve off Fisk Avenue.
- Glengowrie High School first opened in 1969. It was closed and demolished in 1991 when the school body was amalgamated with Mitchell Park High School to form Hamilton Secondary College. The site is now occupied by the Glengowrie Retirement Estate and Hazelmere Reserve.
- The Catholic Church in Glengowrie is dedicated to Our Lady of Grace.

== Tram stop ==
Marion Road is also the location of a stop on the Glenelg tram line.

Preceding station	Adelaide Metro	Following station
Morphett Road towards Royal Adelaide Hospital, Adelaide Entertainment Centre or Festival Plaza	Glenelg tram line	Glenelg East towards Moseley Square

== See also ==
- List of Adelaide suburbs
