= Glenelg South, South Australia =

Glenelg South
- Suburb
- Coordinates: 34°59′28″S 138°31′08″E
- Country: Australia
- State: South Australia
- City: Adelaide
- LGA: City of Holdfast Bay
- Location: 11 km (6.8 mi) from Adelaide city centre; 16 km (9.9 mi) from Port Adelaide; 5 km (3.1 mi) from Adelaide Airport

Government
  - State electorate: Morphett
  - Federal division: Boothby

Population
  - Total: 2,184 (SAL 2021)
- Postcode: 5045
Suburbs around Glenelg South
	Glenelg	Glenelg East
Gulf St Vincent	Glenelg South	Glenelg East
	Somerton Park	Somerton Park

Glenelg South is a suburb on the coast of Adelaide, South Australia.
