= John Morphett =

Anglo-Australian pioneer, landowner and politician (1809–1892)

Sir John Morphett
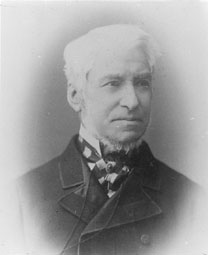
- John Morphett, c. 1885

President of the South Australian Legislative Council
- In office 31 March 1865 – 2 April 1873
- Preceded by: James Hurtle Fisher
- Succeeded by: Sir William Milne

Chief Secretary of South Australia
- In office 4 February 1861 – 8 October 1861
- Preceded by: George Waterhouse
- Succeeded by: George Waterhouse

Member of the South Australian Legislative Council
- In office 15 June 1843 – 30 October 1855
- In office 9 March 1857 – 2 April 1873

Personal details
- Born: 4 May 1809 London, England
- Died: 7 November 1892 (aged 83) Cummins, Novar Gardens, South Australia
- Spouse: Elizabeth nee Fisher
- Occupation: landowner; politician
- Known for: settler

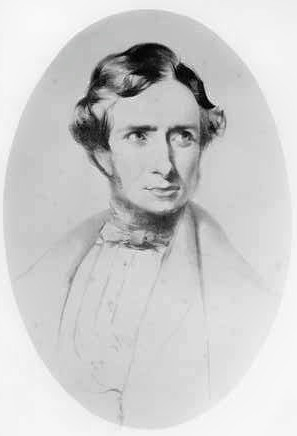
Sir John Morphett, c. 1834

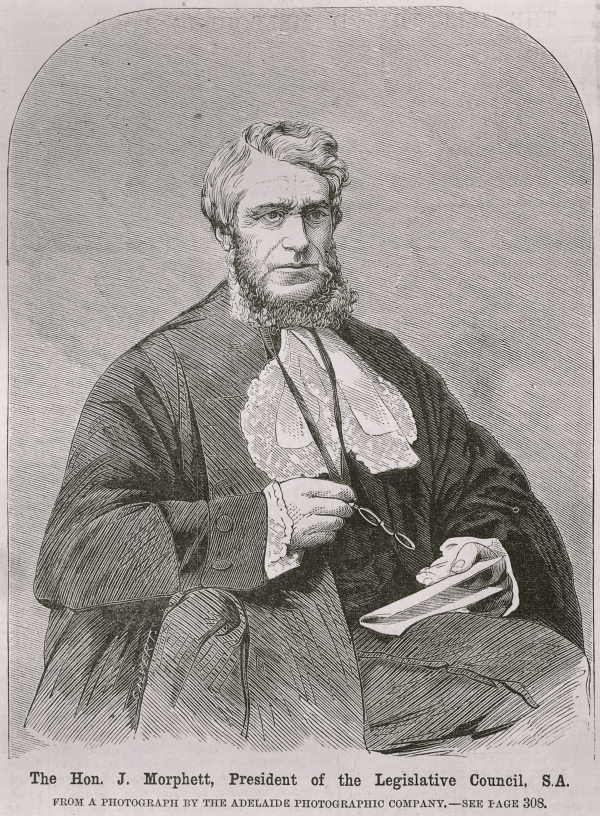
John Morphett, c. 1866

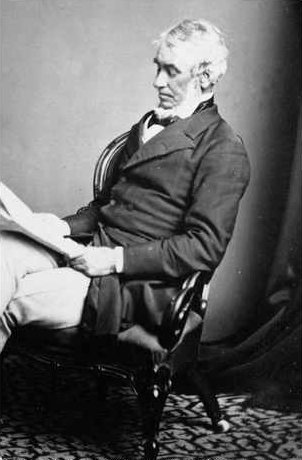
Sir John Morphett, c. 1880

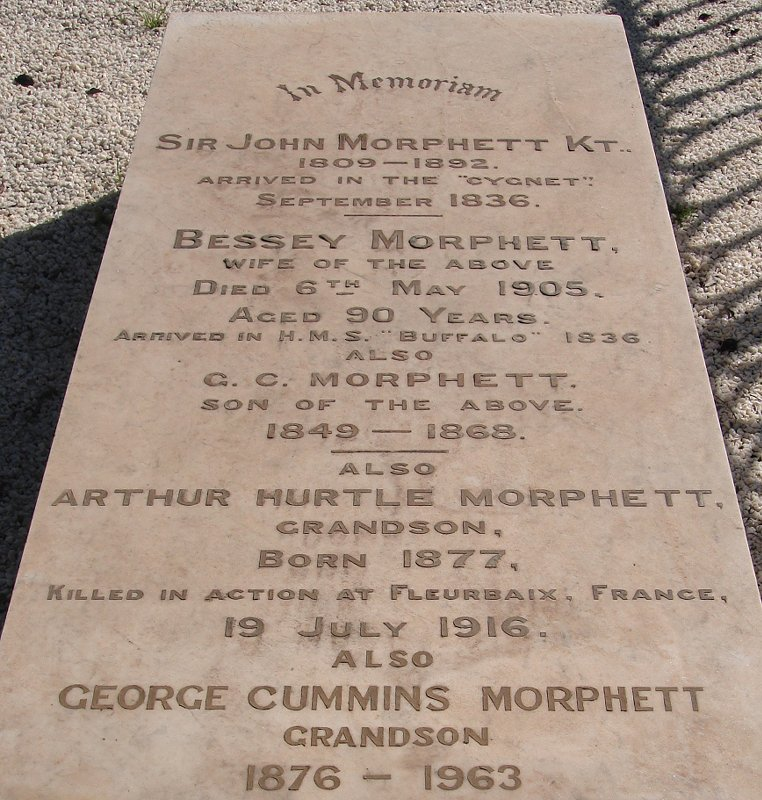
Gravestone in West Terrace Cemetery.

Sir John Morphett (4 May 1809 – 7 November 1892) was a South Australian pioneer, landowner and politician. His younger brother George Morphett was also an early settler in South Australia.

== Early life ==
Morphett was born in London, the second son of Nathaniel Morphett, a solicitor, and his wife Mary, née Gliddon, of Cummins, Ide, Devon. When very young he was sent to a boarding school with Mme Pasquier in Wandsworth, and then to Webber's school in Teignmouth, Devon with his younger brother George. At 14 he went to the Manor House Academy, a school run by the mathematics writer Daniel Dowling at the top of Highgate Hill, London. It offered "a broad liberal education, with social accomplishments and a choice of vocational and scientific courses". He walked three miles there and back from Camden Town. At 16 he started as an office boy in the employ of a ship broker, Henry Blanshard. He then obtained a position in the counting house of Wilson & Blanshard.

At 21 he left for Egypt and worked in the counting-house of Harris & Co in Alexandria. It was here that he met Colonel William Light. He returned to London in 1834, became interested in the South Australian colonisation schemes, and was an early investor in the South Australian Company; he was one of the first who paid £81 for a preliminary land order of 134 acres. With his younger brother George, he set up an agency business and published a pamphlet declaring his intention of migrating to South Australia and his readiness to act for purchasers of land. He also advertised in similar terms in the Globe and Traveller, 30 July 1835. In September 1834 he joined the South Australian Literary Association, and around the end of 1835 he attended the dinner given to honour Captain Hindmarsh's appointment as governor of South Australia.

== Arrival in South Australia ==
On 20 March 1836, Morphett sailed for South Australia in the Cygnet, which arrived at Kangaroo Island on 11 September 1836. On 5 November 1836, the Cygnet arrived at Holdfast Bay. Next day, with Lieutenant Field and George Strickland Kingston, he explored the River Torrens. With others on the Cygnet, he also identified the mouth of the Port River, identified the suitability of Port Adelaide, and visited Port Lincoln with Light. At the crucial meeting on 10 February 1837, he played a decisive role in confirming the choice of Adelaide for a settlement.

On 15 August 1838 he married Elizabeth Hurtle Fisher, the eldest daughter of James Hurtle Fisher (later Sir James), whom he had first met at the meetings of the South Australian Literary Association in London. They were married at Trinity Church, South Australia's first Anglican Church.

As a land agent for the South Australian Company, he secured valuable land for his family and clients; he was energetic, enthusiastic sensible and lucky, and profited greatly from a multitude of land transactions. A Secondary Towns Association was formed in England in 1838, and Morphett became the local Colonial Representative for that Association. In this capacity he often engaged the services of John Hill in exploring for survey sites, while also exploring himself. In May 1839 he paid £4,000 for a Special Survey of 4,000 acres (1,600 ha) of land along the Hutt River, and in November 1939 he bought 8,000 acres on the River Murray which became the Wood's Point Estate. During November 1841, as one of the trustees for Lt. Col. George Gawler, Morphett selected land in sections 1553 and 1554 to the south of the Barossa South Survey.

In December 1839, Morphett was elected Director of the South Australian Railway Company. In 1842, he became one of four members appointed by the Crown to assist the Governor, and was also elected Chairman of the Chamber of Commerce. Morphett was one of the originators of the Agricultural and Horticultural Society, presiding over the introductory meeting on 24 April 1844. In April 1846, he became a member of the Committee of management of the English Railway Company which proposed to lay a railway along Port Road. He was a director of the Adelaide Mining Company, and also a director of the South Australian Mining Association which owned the Burra mine. When the Adelaide Cricket Club was formed in 1853, Morphett became its vice-president and his father-in-law, J.H. Fisher, its president.

== Political life ==
Morphett was appointed treasurer to the town corporation on 5 December 1840, and on 15 June 1843 was nominated as one of four non-official members of the expanded South Australian Legislative Council. In January 1845 he chaired the meeting called to protest the British government's proposal to send Parkhurst prison boys to South Australia. In September 1846, as a protest against the mining royalty bill being passed by the casting vote of Governor Robe, Morphett and the three other non-official council members left the chamber – in consequence the council was left without a quorum. In August 1851 Morphett became Speaker of the enlarged Legislative Council, and on 9 March 1857 he was elected a member of the legislative council at the first election under responsible government. He was chief secretary in the Thomas Reynolds ministry from February to October 1861, and on 31 March 1865 was elected President of the South Australian Legislative Council, a position he held until his retirement. He was knighted on 16 February 1870 for his services to South Australia. In February 1873 he retired from politics and public life. His sons Hurtle and John Cummins took over the running of his properties along the Murray.

== Personal life ==
Freemasonry filled a great part of Morphett's personal life. He was elected as a member and initiated into the Craft on 27 November 1834 in London when The Lodge of Friendship, a Lodge especially founded to become South Australia's first Lodge, held its very first meeting. Later he rose in position within the Lodge, (which is still in operation), ultimately to become its Master.

He returned to England twice: alone in 1846, leaving Mrs. Morphett at home with four daughters and a son; then in December 1855 with his wife, ten children and two servants.

== Death ==
Morphett died at his home, Cummins House, Novar Gardens, on 7 November 1892. He was survived by his wife Elizabeth, six daughters and four of his five sons.

== Legacy ==
Morphett had faith in the colony from the beginning: although he realized that for a period South Australia would be regarded as a pastoral colony, depending chiefly on its export of wool, as early as 1838 he had hopes of raising wine, olive oil, figs, maize, flax, silk, rice, indigo and tobacco.

Morphett supported Fisher and Gouger in their quarrels with Hindmarsh, later becoming a force in the Legislative Council, and he worked hard for responsible government. He took an active part in the formation of the Literary Association and the Mechanics Institute, and was an early supporter of St Peter's College. He was one of the earliest men to take an interest in horse racing in South Australia, and Morphettville Racecourse was named after him. Also named after him were the suburbs of Morphettville and Morphett Vale, Morphett Street in the Adelaide city centre, Morphett Road in the city's western suburbs and the state electoral district of Morphett.

== Family ==
=== Parents ===
John was born on 4 May 1809 in London, England, the second son of Nathaniel and Mary, née Gliddon.

=== Siblings ===
His siblings included:

- George Morphett (1811–1893).
- Nathaniel Morphett (1807–1828)
- Mary Morphett (1813–1830)

=== Children ===
John Morphett (1809–1892) married Elizabeth Hurtle Fisher (1815–1905) on 15 August 1838 at Holy Trinity Church, Adelaide.

John and Elizabeth had 12 children with their first child stillborn.

		Married	Lived	Notes
0.	Stillborn male			
1.	Mary	William Mair	1840-	
2.	Amy Gawler	Charles William May JP (1831–1873) married 1861	1841–1922	Seven children Buried with her husband in St. Judes Cemetery, Brighton
3.	Ada Fisher	Harry Lockett Ayers (1844–1905); Married 1866	1843–1939	Harry was the second son of Sir Henry Ayers
4.	John Cummins	Mary Frances married 1875	1844–1936	– 2nd owner of "Cummins"; Mary was youngest daughter of William Sanders
5.	Adelaide Sturt	George Henderson (1841–1886) married 1864 St Peter's Church Glenelg SA	1846–1940	Lived (and died) in New Zealand
6.	George Cooper	unmarried	1849–1868	Died aged 19
7.	Violet	1) Reginald Cobb; 2) Robert Alfred Stock	1850–1927	
8.	Charles Edward		1852–1926	
9.	James Hurtle		1854–1919	
10.	Hurtle Willoughby	unmarried	1855–1938	
11.	Marian Fisher Georgina	1) Edward Mammatt Colley; 2) Frederick Goldsmid Levi (–1934)	1859–1931	

Amy, Ada and Mary
ca. 1855

Mary, Amy, Adelaide
Marian, Violet, Ada
ca. 1880

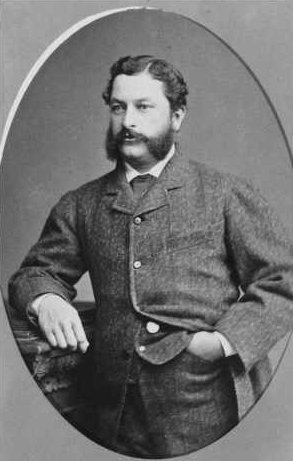
Harry Lockett Ayers
ca. 1880

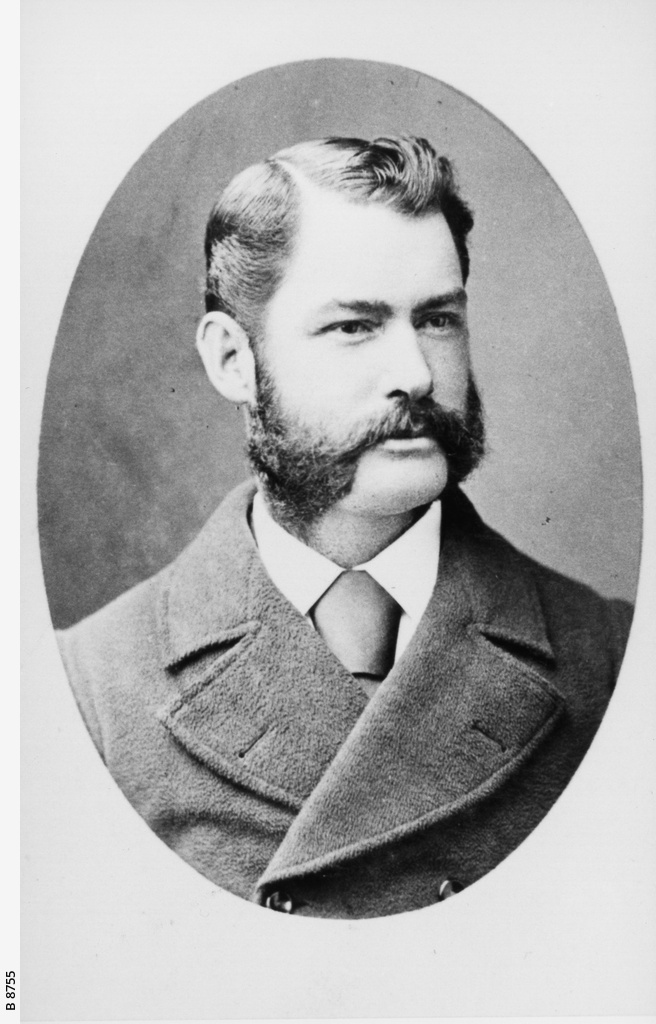
John Cummins Morphett 1890

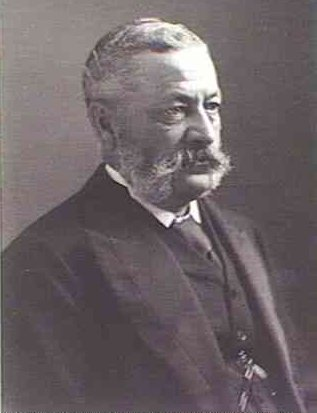
Harry Lockett Ayers
ca. 1900

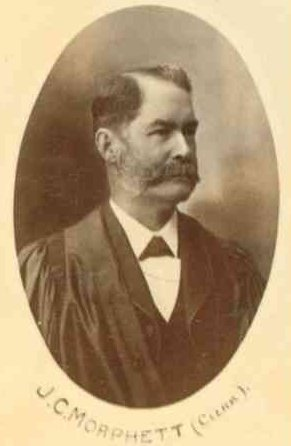
John Cummins Morphett 1902

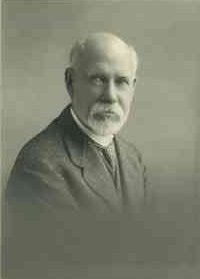
Hurtle Willoughby Morphett 1920

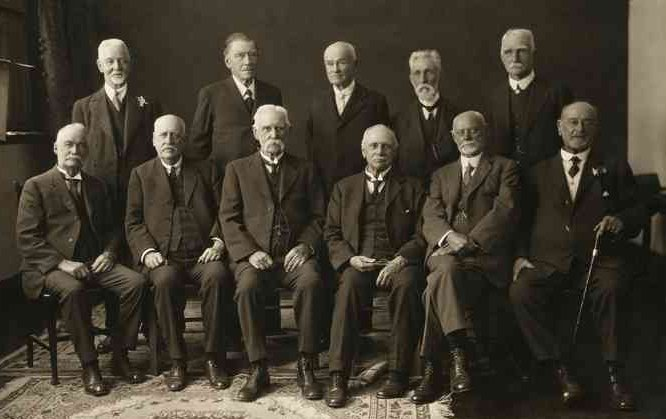
John Cummins Morphett (seated, left), 1927

=== Grandchildren ===
John Morphett's grandchildren included:
Child	Lived	Father	Mother	Born	Notes
George Cummins	1876–1963	John Cummins	Mary Frances SANDERS	Adelaide	3rd owner of "Cummins"
Arthur Hurtle	1877–1916	John Cummins	Mary Frances SANDERS	Adelaide	
Annie Elizabeth	1879	John Cummins	Mary Frances SANDERS	Adelaide	
Bessey	1880	John Cummins	Mary Frances SANDERS	New Glenelg	
Mary Eleanor	1882	John Cummins	Mary Frances SANDERS	Glenelg	
Lucy	1883	John Cummins	Mary Frances SANDERS	Glenelg	
Amy Mabel MAY	1866–1953	Charles William May	Amy Gawler		Married George Walpole Leake (1825–1895) in 1893.

Mr & Mrs George Cummins Morphett on the occasion of their golden wedding anniversary, 1951

=== Fourth generation ===
John Morphett's great-grandchildren included:
Child	Birthdate	Father	Mother	Where	Notes
Audrey Cummins OBE	27 May 1902	George Cummins	Violet Alice ANDERSON	Mount Gambier	Awarded Queen Elizabeth II's coronation medal in 1953, OBE in 1960. She never married, died 8 October 1983
Hurtle Cummins	31 March 1906	George Cummins	Violet Alice ANDERSON	Corowa, NSW	Married Joan, daughter of Sir William Goodman on 16 March 1937, 4th owner of "Cummins", he sold the property to the State Government for ~$200,000 in 1977.

Hurtle Cummins Morphett 1951 (right)

=== Fifth generation ===
- John Cummins Morphett (1943-), last generation to live in Cummins, is the son of Hurtle Cummins Morphett
John Cummins Morphett, 1951 (front left)

Parliament of South Australia
Preceded by Edward Frome; John Jackson; Charles Sturt	Member of the South Australian Legislative Council; 1843 – 1855; Served alongside: Multiple Members	Succeeded by John Barrow; William Peacock; Judah Solomon
Political offices
Preceded by George Waterhouse	Chief Secretary of South Australia; 1861	Succeeded by George Waterhouse
South Australian Legislative Council
Preceded by James Fisher	President of the South Australian Legislative Council; 1865–1873	Succeeded by William Milne
