= Kingston House, Kingston Park =

Kingston Historic House
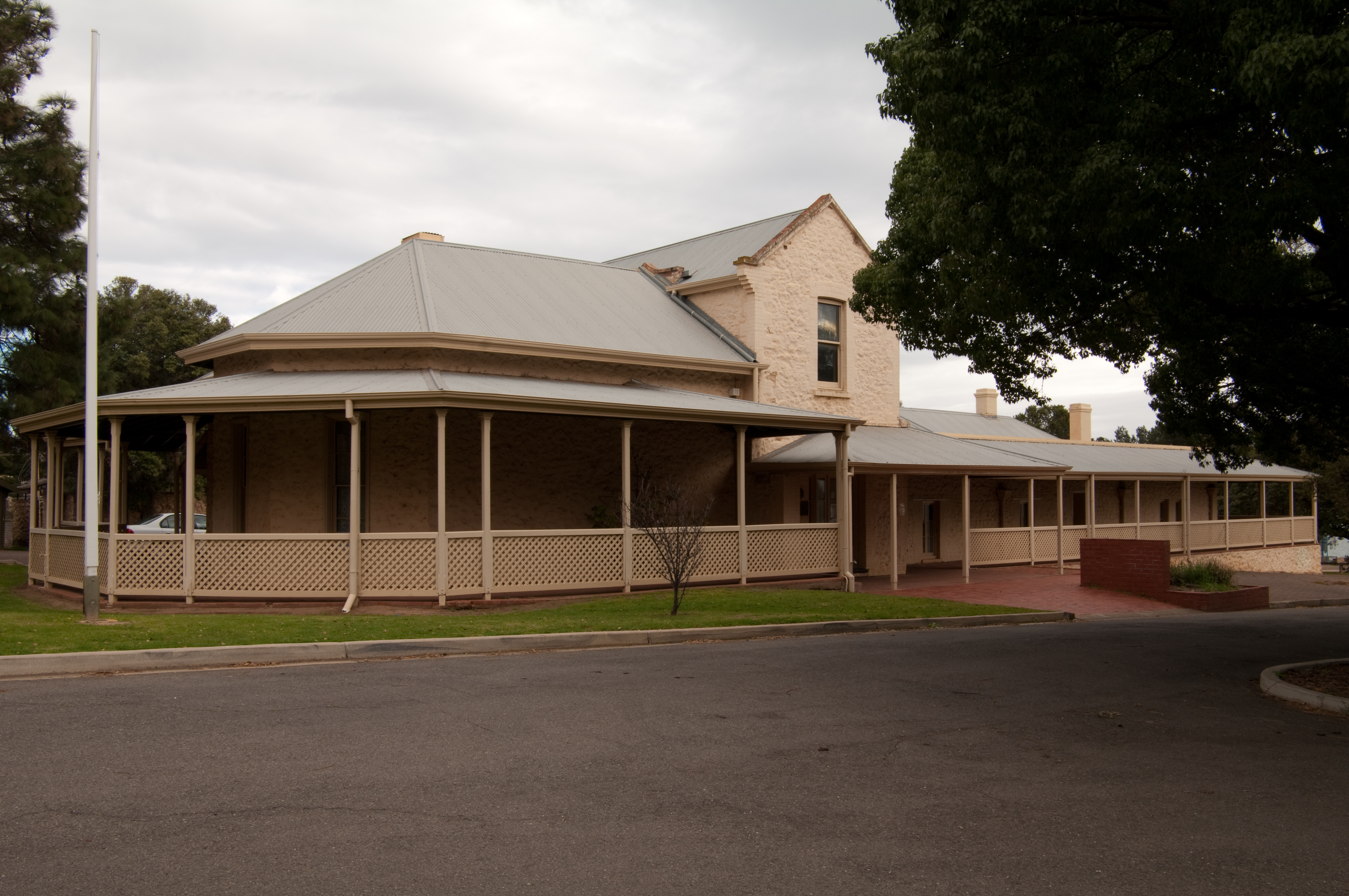
- Interactive map of the Kingston Historic House area
- Former names: Kingston House, Marino Hotel and Boarding House, Marino Inn

General information
- Location: Kingston Park, South Australia
- Coordinates: 35°02′27″S 138°30′58″E
- Construction started: 1840
- Renovated: 1851; 1983
- Owner: Government of South Australia

Kingston Historical House is a pioneer house found in Kingston Park, South Australia, a suburb of Adelaide, South Australia.

== Early history ==
Sir George Strickland Kingston purchased eighty acres (32 hectares) of land in 1839 in the area now known as Kingston Park. The house was built in two stages, firstly in 1840 and then in 1851. As such it is the oldest building in Holdfast Bay City Council and one of the oldest in the state of South Australia. In 1840 Kingston leased the premises to fellow Cygnet passenger, Robert Bristow, who began the first hotel in the Brighton-Marino district. Bristow was granted a licence to sell beer and wine in September 1840. Patronage for the inn was expected from fishermen, quarrymen and sailors given the nearby fishing village, newly opened quarry and newly built pier. Management changed hands in late 1841 to Mr Burslem who maintained it as the Marino Hotel and Boarding House until 1843. From then until 1851, Kingston leased the land to farmer Samual Oakley. In 1851 Kingston undertook extensions and renovations in preparation for this to become his family's seaside holiday abode. Ownership was passed down to his son, Charles Kingston, Premier of South Australia.

== Government ownership ==
The land and building was purchased in 1919 by the State Government of South Australia, upon Lucy Kingston's (widow of Charles) death. A major restoration was undertaken in 1983. The building is now set on a 3-acre (12,000 m^{2}) reserve sitting atop the Kingston Beach Cliff Face, and the house is surrounded by a small park.

The building was listed on the now-defunct Register of the National Estate on 21 March 1978 and on the South Australian Heritage Register on 24 June 1980.
