= Glenelg East, South Australia =

Glenelg East
- Suburb
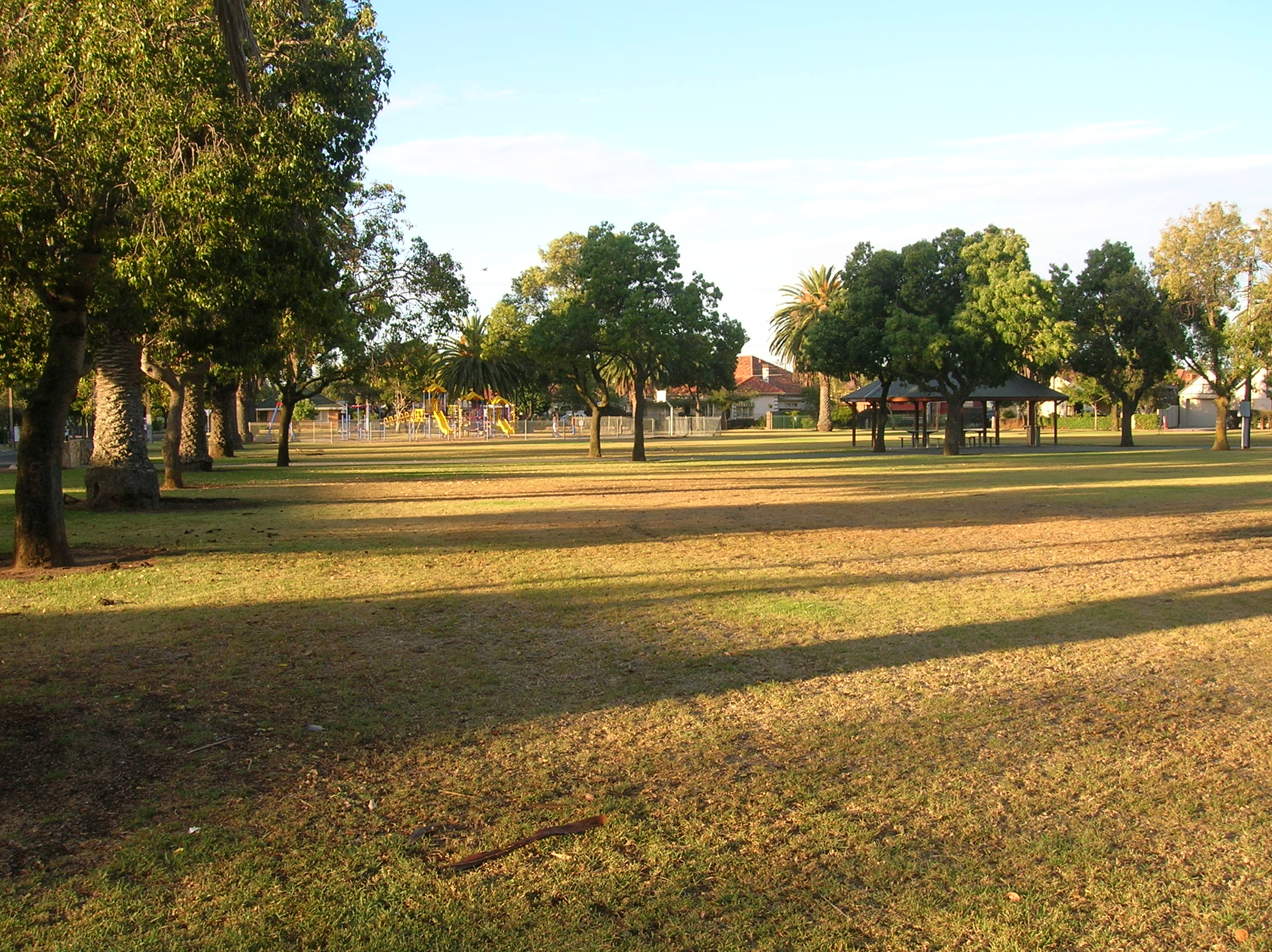
- Da Costa Reserve Glenelg East

- Country: Australia
- State: South Australia
- City: Adelaide
- LGA: City of Holdfast Bay
- Location: 9 km (5.6 mi) from GPO

Government
  - State electorate: Morphett
  - Federal division: Boothby

Population
  - Total: 3,855 (SAL 2021)
- Postcode: 5045
Suburbs around Glenelg East
Glenelg; North	Glenelg; North	Novar Gardens
Glenelg	Glenelg East	Glengowrie
Glenelg South	Glengowrie	Glengowrie

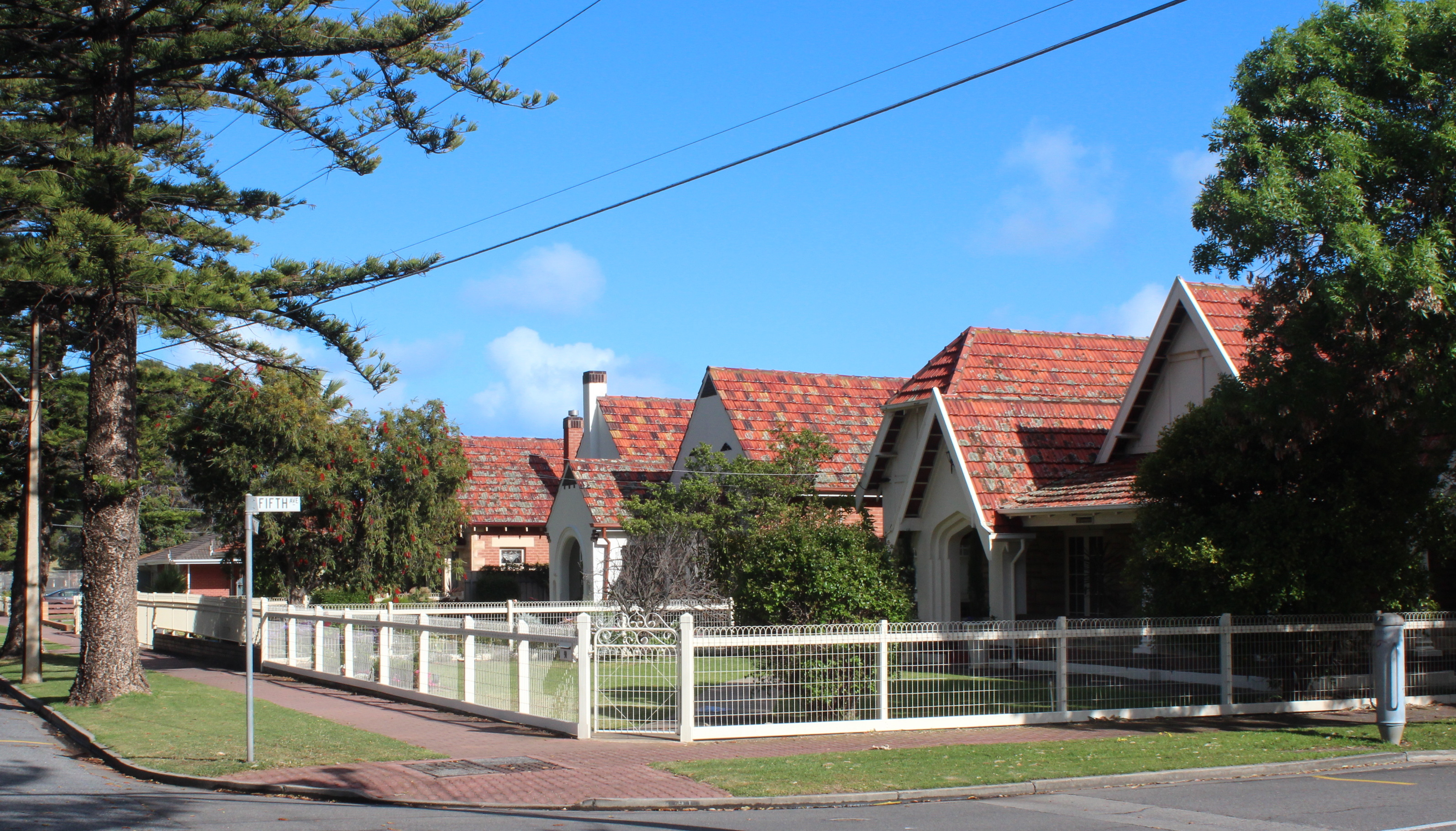
Glenelg East Streetscape

Glenelg East is a residential suburb 9 kilometres (5.6 mi) south-west of the centre of Adelaide, South Australia. It is characterised by quarter-acre blocks with heritage homes and parks intermingled with contemporary modern homes and low-rise multi-dwelling units.

== Demographics ==
In 2011 Glenelg East's population was 3,701 with a median age of 41 (Australia: 37). Children aged to 14 made up 14.1% (Australia: 19.3%) of the population, and those over 65 years 15.8% (Australia: 13.1%). The predominant home language is English, others being; Greek, Italian, German and Cantonese.

== Geography ==
Glenelg East is bordered by Anzac Highway to the north, Cliff Street to the south, Brighton Road to the west and Buttrose Street to the east.

== Amenities ==
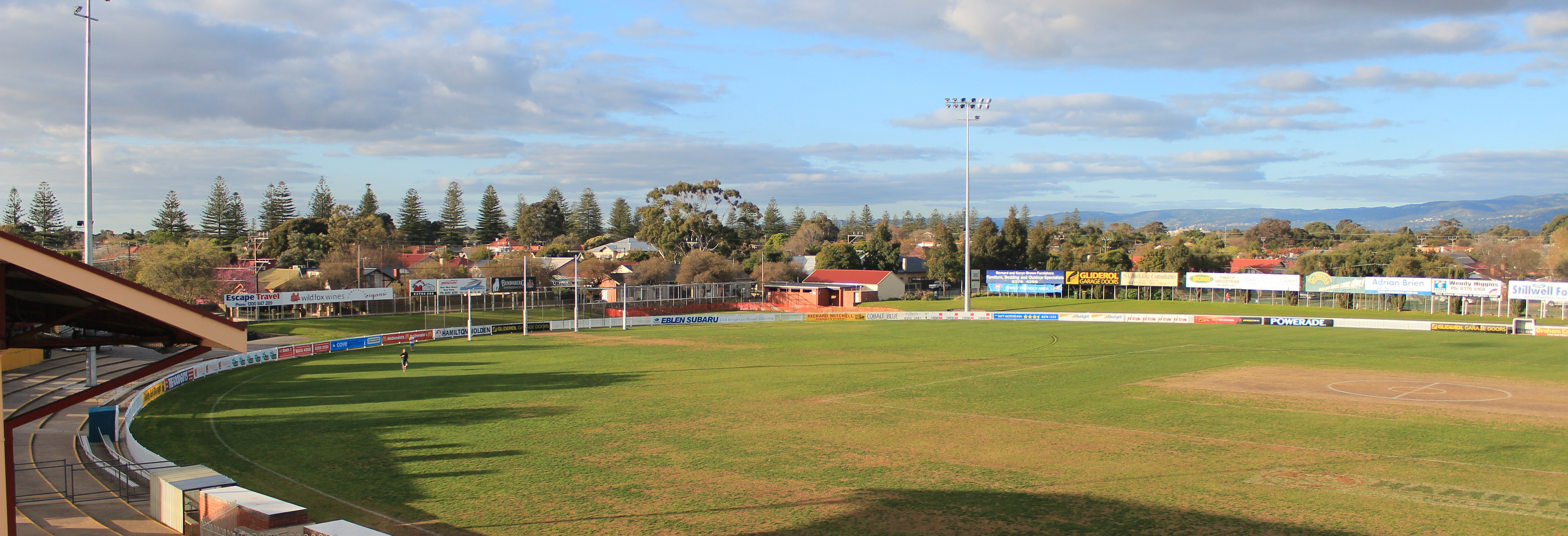
View to north east from Glenelg Oval, Glenelg East and Norfolk Pines along tramline in the background

With the Glenelg and Glenelg South beaches within walking distance, the suburb is popular with families. There are several parks with children's play equipment, open spaces, barbecue facilities and shelters. Notable parks within the suburb include Da Costa, Sandison, Margaret Messenger and Mel Baker Reserves. Glenelg East has two tennis clubs: the Helmsdale Tennis Club at Sandison Reserve, and the Holdfast Tennis Club at Margaret Messenger Reserve.

The Glenelg Oval is a well-used cricket and Australian Rules Football venue that is the home ground for the SANFL Glenelg Football Club.

The suburb is a popular with cycling enthusiasts who rendezvous at a local coffee shop prior to weekend rides through Adelaide's beach suburbs.

== Community ==
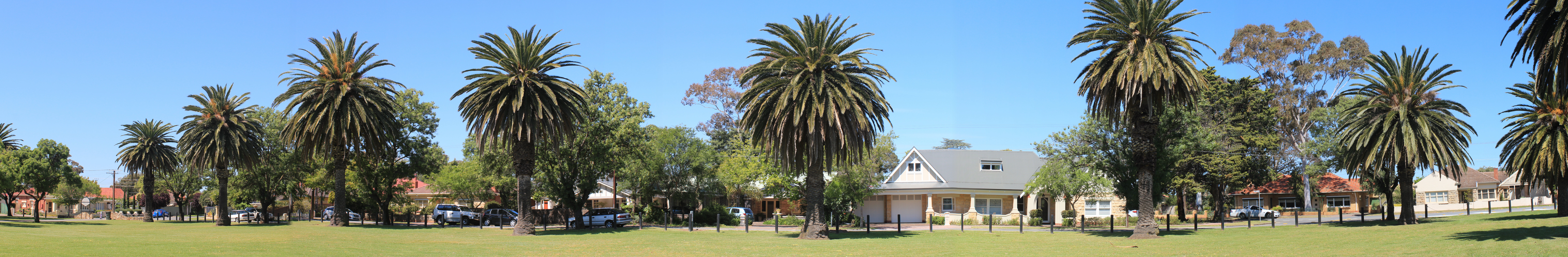
Streetscape of Hawkes Avenue Glenelg East

=== Homes in Glenelg East ===
The City of Holdfast Bay Development Plan zones Glenelg East primarily for single storey residences, a second story being allowed where compatible with existing buildings. The plan specifies that residential site sizes are maintained in excess of 600 square metres (0.15 acres) maintaining the lower density that residents seek. A feature of the development plan is also its focus on Heritage Conservation Zones, one of which is within the suburb surrounding Da Costa Park. The Heritage Conservation seeks to preserve certain styles of residential homes that are common in Glenelg East. The styles originate in overlapping periods as follows;

- Victorian (1860s – 1900)
- Federation (1890s – 1920)
- Inter War (1920s – 1950s).

=== Da Costa Park Heritage (Conservation) Zone ===
Original and restored examples of building styles from these periods are found throughout the suburb, particularly in the streets surrounding the Da Costa Park Heritage Conservation Zone. The Tudor Revival and Californian Bungalow styles that were built in the Inter War period are the most prevalent, while a few examples of Federation Homes can also be found.

Common Housing Styles in the suburb of Glenelg East

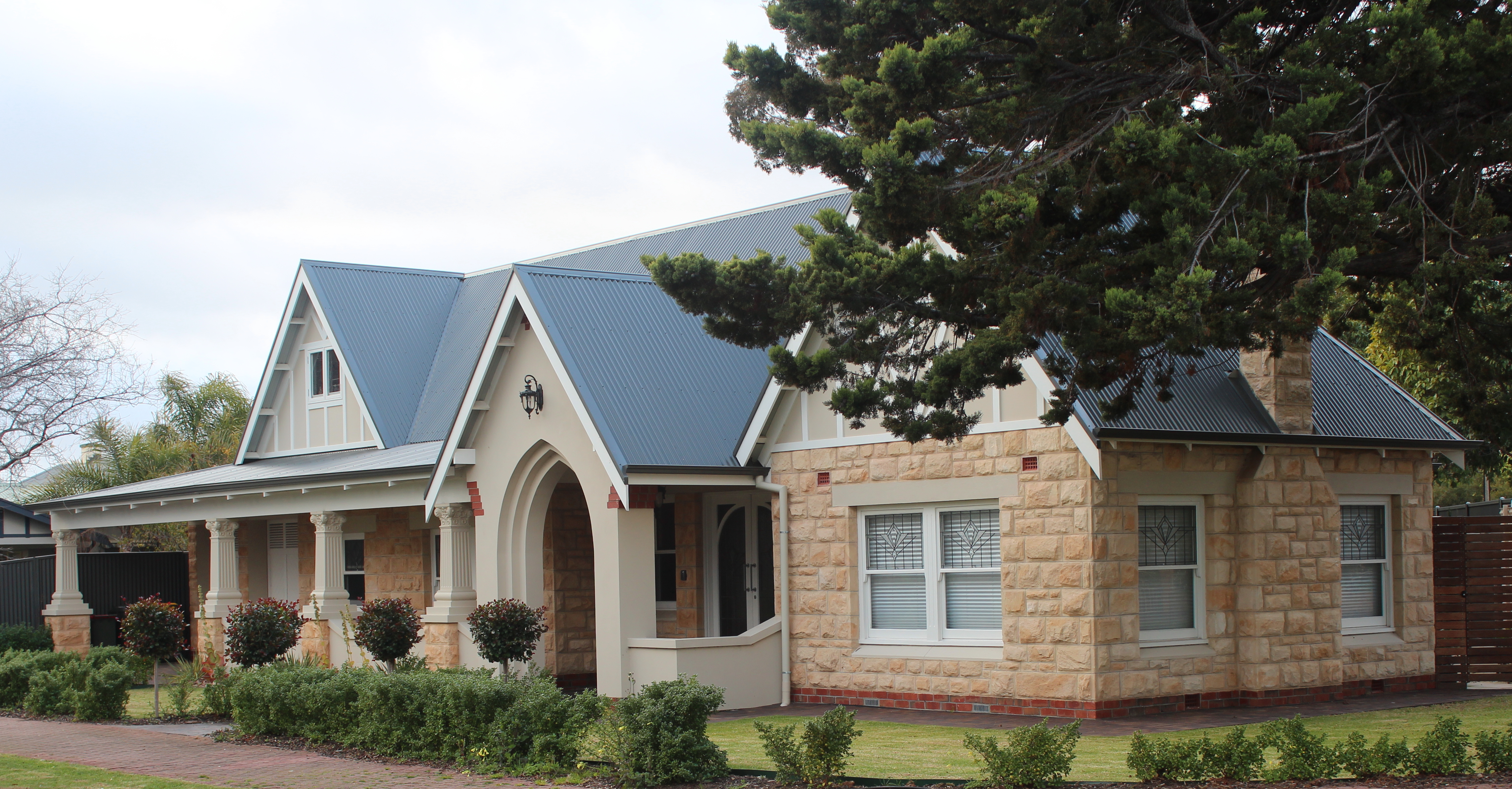
Restored Tudor Revival Da Costa Park

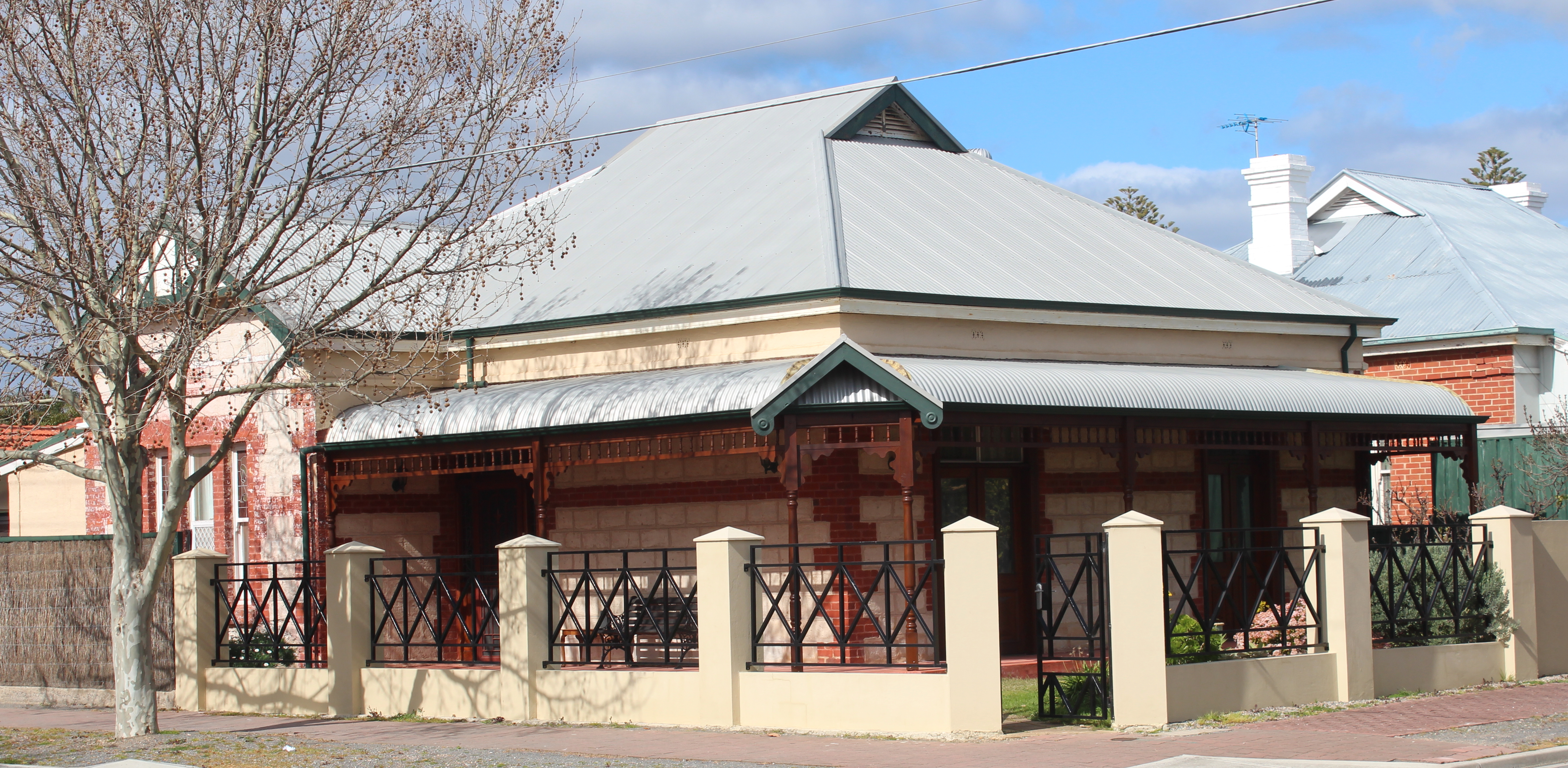
Federation Style Residence

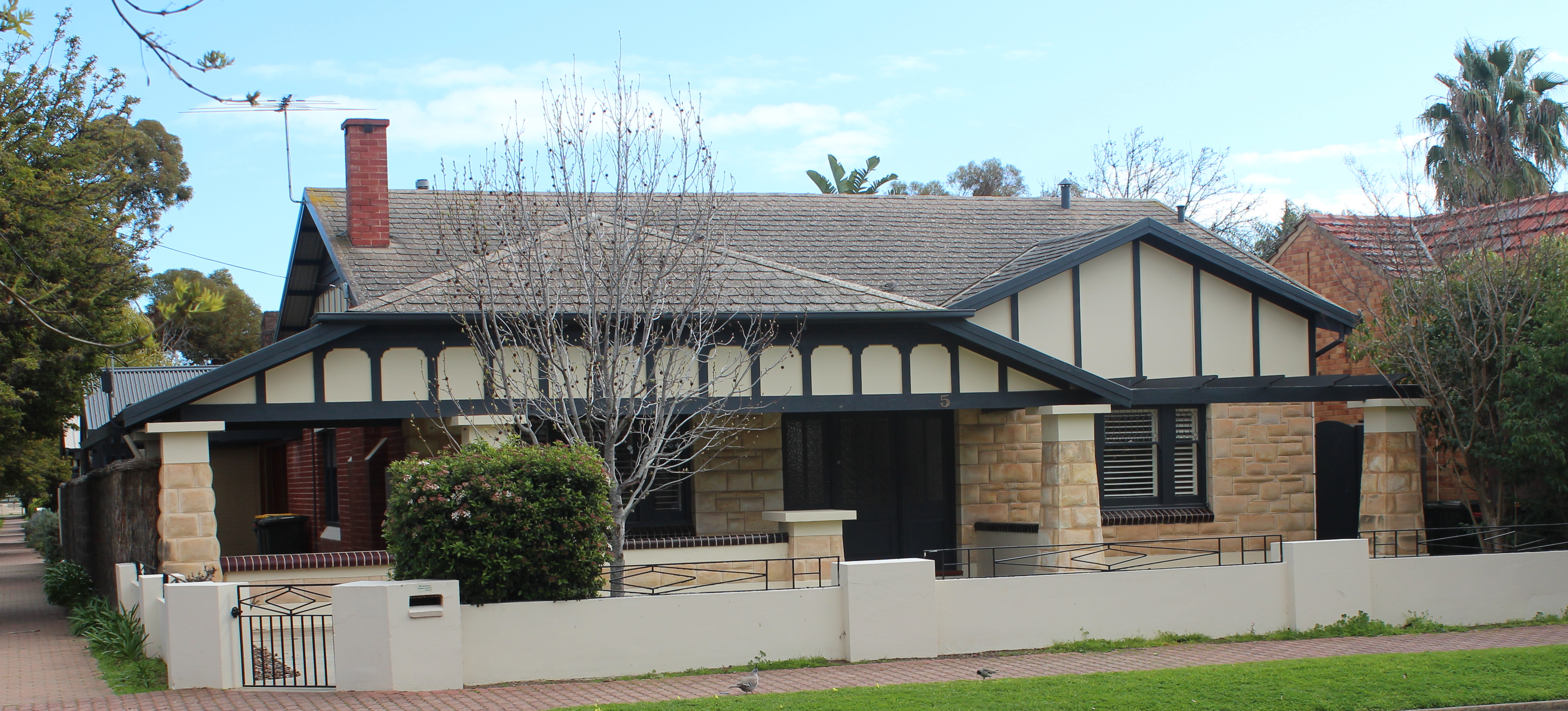
Californian Bungalow Style Residence

=== Schools ===
Glenelg Primary School is located within the suburb.

Within walking distance in neighbouring suburbs are two private schools: St Peter's Woodlands Grammar School and Immanuel College.

A majority of the suburb also fits into the Brighton Secondary School Zone.

== Transport ==
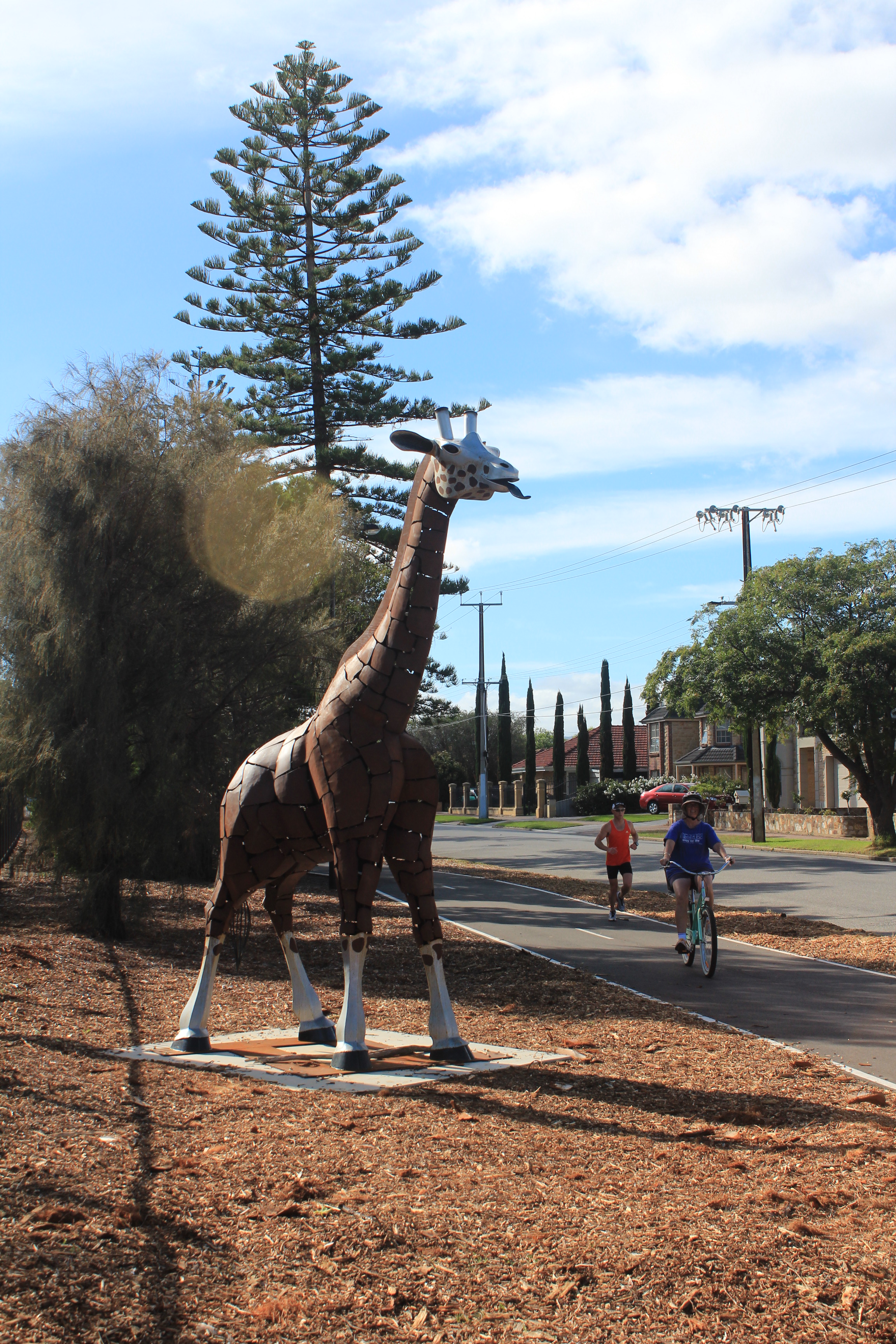
An Iron Sculpture of a Giraffe on the Mike Turtur Bikeway in Glenelg East South Australia

City Bay Tram approaching Glenelg East Stop

Glenelg East has access to main roads adjacent to the suburb. Travel times by car to the Adelaide CBD and the Adelaide Airport are about 25 and 15 minutes respectively. The suburb is well serviced by bus routes along Anzac Highway and Brighton Road. The Glenelg tram, which runs through Glenelg East, has four stops within the suburb. Trams at 15-20-minute intervals take about 25 minutes to the city and 50 minutes to the Adelaide Entertainment Centre. The service was first opened in August 1873 as the South Terrace railway line. It was taken over by the Municipal Tramways Trust and started operation as an electrified tramway on 14 December 1929.

The Mike Turtur Bikeway alongside the tramline makes commuting by bike popular on a sealed off-road bikeways and on secondary roads within the suburb.

=== Tram stop ===
Glenelg East is also the location of a stop on the Glenelg tram line.

Preceding station	Adelaide Metro	Following station
Glengowrie towards Royal Adelaide Hospital, Adelaide Entertainment Centre or Festival Plaza	Glenelg tram line	Brighton Road towards Moseley Square

== History ==
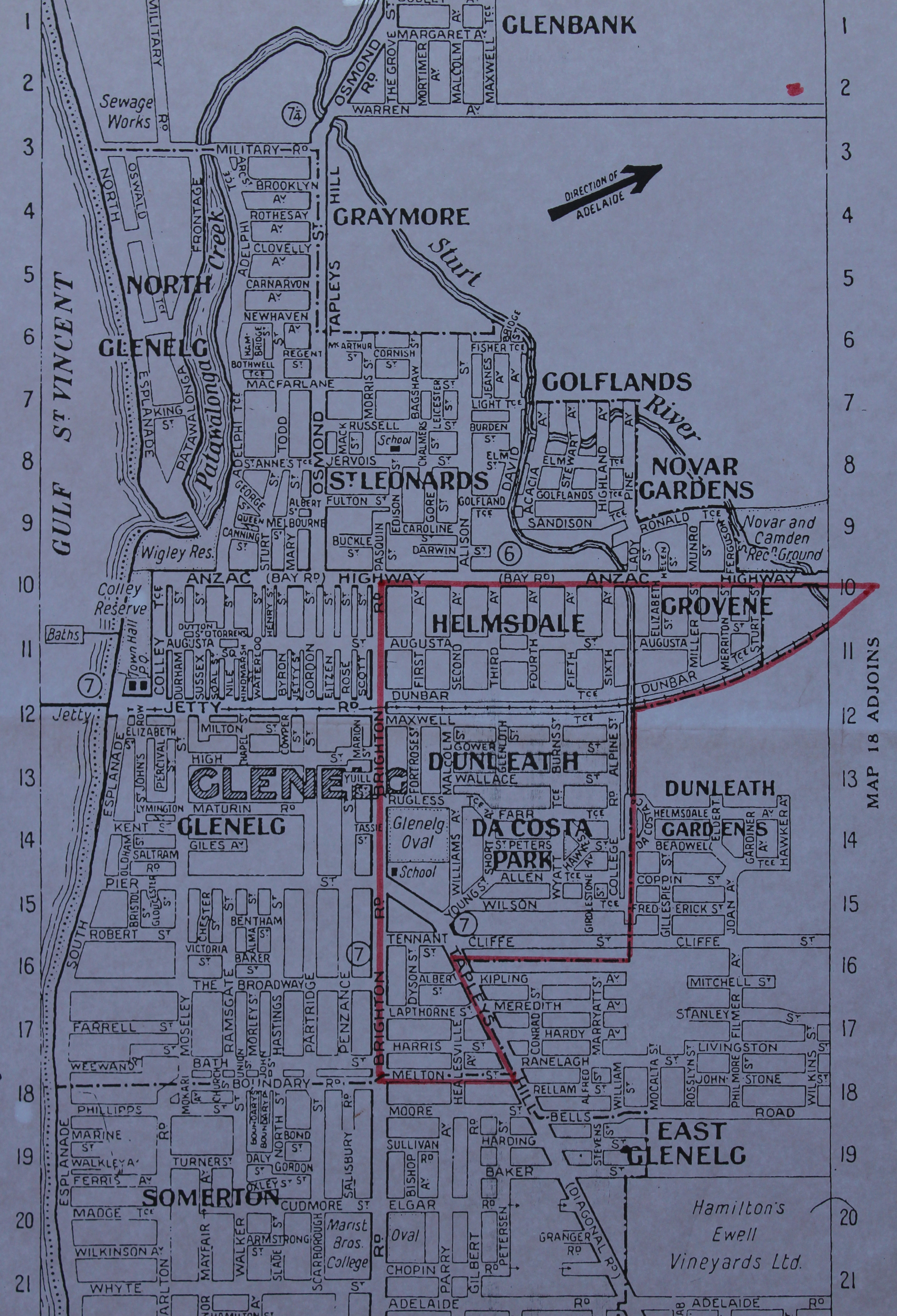
1936 Map of Areas now incorporated as Glenelg East

On 23 November 1947, Glenelg Council amalgamated and renamed the numerous settlements in the area to Glenelg East, Glenelg, Glenelg North and Glenelg South. Glenelg East was formed by combining Grovene, Helmsdale, Dunleath and Da Costa Park. The township of Grovene was originally part of the City of West Torrens, while Da Costa Park was taken over from the Marion District Council. These amalgamations were in accordance with the recommendation of the Royal Commission on Local Government Areas.

The original residential development was the result of a block of land in the south-west corner of the West Torrens District Council area being subdivided in 1911, the subdivided area being named Helmsdale and sold for building blocks. The area was adjoining Glenelg, situated to the east of Brighton Road, west of Sixth Avenue and between the Anzac Highway and the Glenelg Tramline. Later, between 1925 and 1926 land in Dunleath, since incorporated into Glenelg East, and located south of the Glenelg Tramline to Farr Terrace, was released for residential development. On being released, land was in demand with reports of 85 blocks being sold in a morning for a total of £24,067, with properties fronting Brighton Road selling for double the price of other allotments. A second portion of Dunleath was released in January 1946 by Miss Charlotte I. Sandison, of Glenelg and the estate of her sister. Miss Sandison and her sister had inherited the land from Mr. E. L. J. McHenry son of Dr. McHenry, the original owner. As Mr McHenry had no descendants and the Sandison's family had been tenants on the property 87 years prior, the land was willed directly to the sisters.

Da Costa Park, now included in the suburb, is named after Benjamin Mendes Da Costa, a resident of Adelaide who engaged in mercantile pursuits in the early days of the crown colony. He became the owner of considerable property in South Australia prior to retiring to England in 1848. After his death he left his property in South Australia to St Peters College.
