= John Oswald (politician) =

Australian politician

John Kenneth Gibson Oswald (born 6 June 1939) is a former Australian politician. He was a Liberal Party member of the South Australian House of Assembly between 1979 and 2002, representing the safe Liberal electorate of Morphett.

Previous to Oswald's involvement in state politics, he was a member of Rotary and numerous electorate, sporting and other clubs, as well as a registered pharmacist through the University of Adelaide.

From 1993 to 1995, Oswald was Minister for Housing, Urban Development and Local Government Relations, Minister for Recreation, and Sport and Racing. From 1997 to 2002, he was the Speaker of the South Australian House of Assembly for the John Olsen and Rob Kerin Liberal governments.

Oswald retired in 2002.

South Australian House of Assembly
| Preceded by Terry Groom | Member for Morphett; 1979–2002 | Succeeded by Duncan McFetridge |
| Preceded by Graham Gunn | Speaker of the South Australian House of Assembly; 1997–2002 | Succeeded by Peter Lewis |
