= Stephen Patterson =

Australian rules footballer and politician

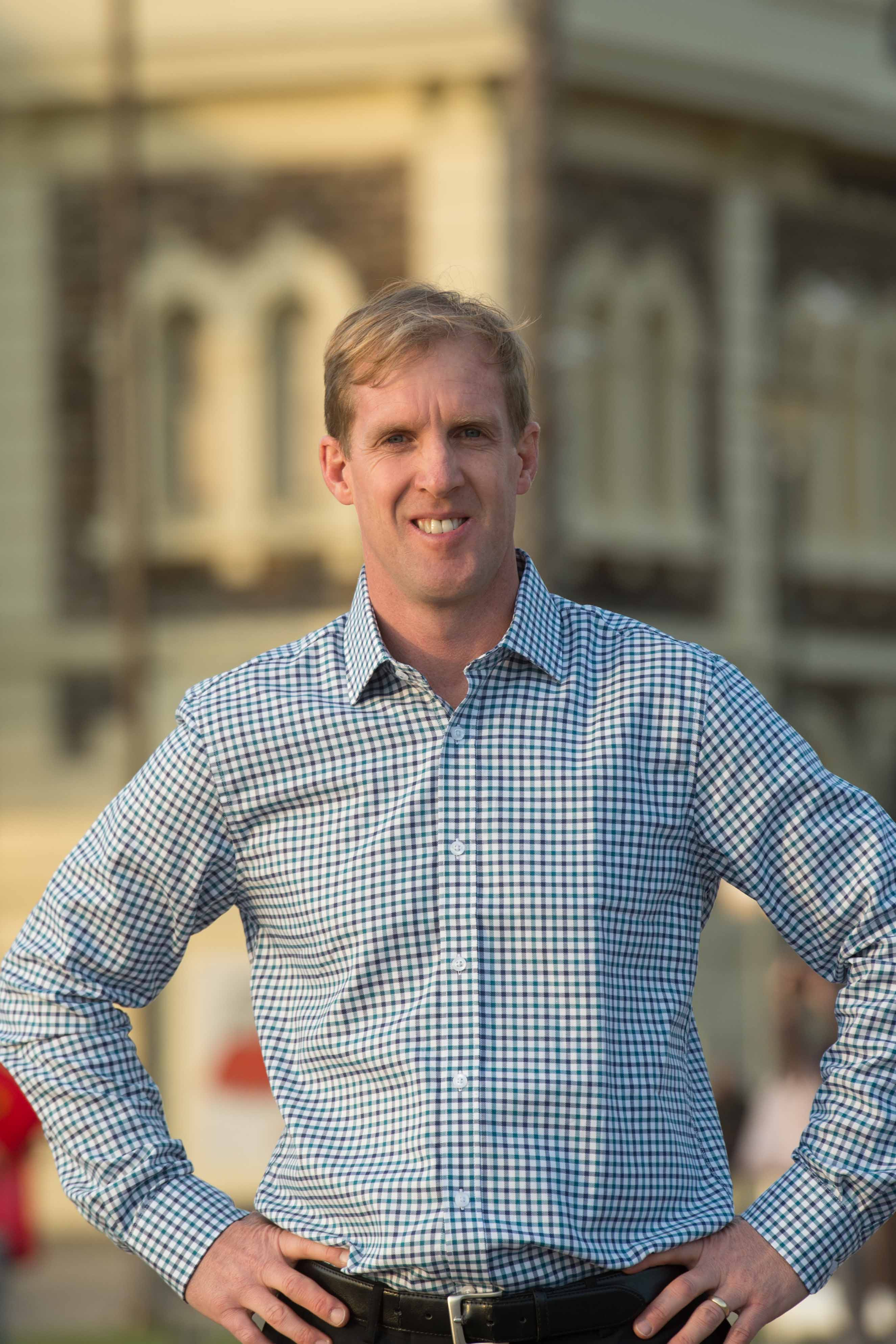
- Patterson in 2017

Minister for Trade and Investment
- In office 29 July 2020 – 21 March 2022
- Premier: Steven Marshall
- Preceded by: David Ridgway
- Succeeded by: Nick Champion

Member of the South Australian House of Assembly for Morphett
- In office 17 March 2018 – 20 March 2026
- Preceded by: Duncan McFetridge
- Succeeded by: Toby Priest

Mayor of the City of Holdfast Bay
- In office November 2014 – March 2018
- Preceded by: Ken Rollond
- Succeeded by: March 2018

Personal details
- Born: Stephen John Rayden Patterson; 4 January 1971 (age 55)
- Party: South Australian Liberal Party
- Education: University of Adelaide
- Occupation: Electrical engineer, small business owner, SANFL/AFL footballer
- Website: stephenpatterson.com.au
Australian rules football career
Personal information
- Original team: Norwood (SANFL)
- Height: 177 cm (5 ft 10 in)
- Weight: 75 kg (165 lb)
- Position: Rover
Playing career^{1}
Years	Club	Games (Goals)
1995–2000	Collingwood	96 (88)
- ^{1} Playing statistics correct to the end of 2000.

Stephen John Rayden Patterson (born 4 January 1971) is a former Australian politician and Australian rules footballer who played with Collingwood in the Australian Football League (AFL), and Norwood in the South Australian National Football League (SANFL).

He was the Liberal member for electoral district of Morphett in South Australian House of Assembly from 2018 until his defeat at the 2026 election. During his time in parliament Patterson served as the Minister for Trade and Investment in the Second Marshall ministry between July 2020 and March 2022 and was the Shadow Minister for Energy and Net Zero, Shadow Minister for Mining and Shadow Minister for Defence and Space Industries in the Speirs shadow ministry.

== Early life ==
Patterson grew up in the Adelaide suburb of Highbury. He attended Pembroke School, Adelaide, and then went on to study a Bachelor of Science (Physics) and Bachelor of Electrical & Electronic Engineering with 1st Class Honours at the University of Adelaide.

== AFL career ==
Originally from South Australian National Football League (SANFL) club Norwood, Patterson was used mostly as a rover at Collingwood. He also played at half forward or as a wingman on occasions and kicked 25 goals in 1996. Patterson gathered three Brownlow Medal votes from Collingwood's win over North Melbourne in the final home and away match of the 1997 season. The following year, in Anzac Day match against Essendon, Patterson was voted Best on Ground after 24 disposals. His performances in the 1998 season saw him finish the year third in Collingwood's Copeland Trophy voting.

He was the first player to kick a goal against Port Adelaide.

== Politics ==
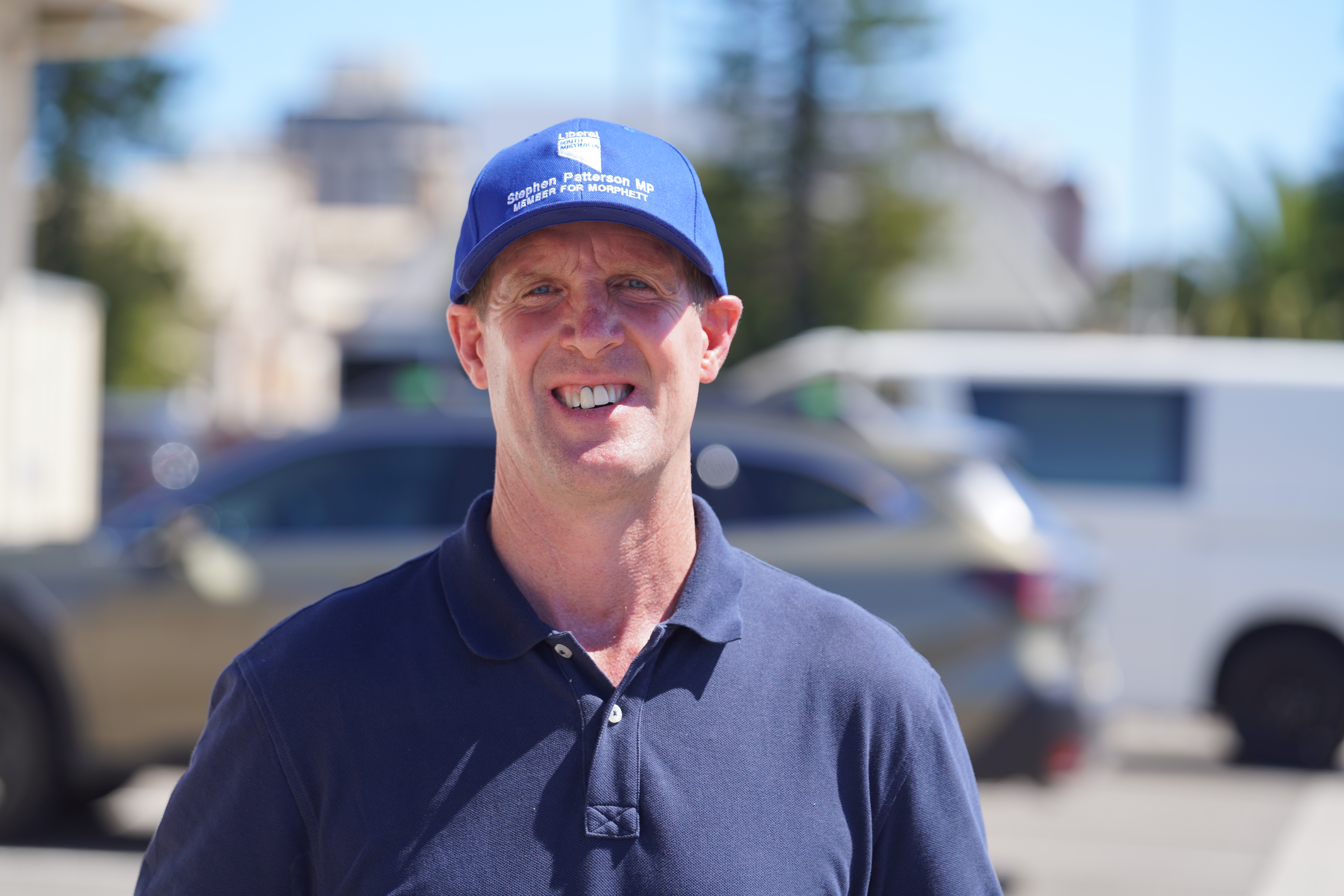
Patterson at an early voting centre in 2026

Patterson was elected as a Councillor for the City of Holdfast Bay in November 2010, and went on to become Deputy Mayor during his term. He became Mayor in November 2014, defeating incumbent Ken Rollond.

In April 2017, he defeated the sitting member, Duncan McFetridge, in Liberal Party preselection for the electoral district of Morphett at the 2018 state election, and was subsequently elected. While he only won 41 percent of the primary vote, McFetridge's preferences flowed overwhelmingly to him, allowing him to easily reclaim the seat for the Liberals.

Patterson has previously served as the Presiding Member of the South Australian House of Assembly Environment, Resources and Development Committee, and the Parliamentary Committee on Occupational Safety, Rehabilitation and Compensation. He has also previously served as a Member of the Economics and Finance Committee, the Public Works Committee, and the Joint Committee on Valuation Policies and Charges on Retirement Villages.

On 29 July 2020, Patterson was appointed as Minister for Trade and Investment, replacing David Ridgway in a cabinet reshuffle.

On 21 April 2022, Patterson was appointed as the Shadow Minister for Energy and Net Zero, Shadow Minister for Mining and Shadow Minister for Defence and Space Industries.

Patterson was defeated at the 2026 state election by Labor candidate Toby Priest.

== Personal life ==
Patterson is married and has four children, including Collingwood AFLW player Violet Patterson. Patterson is an active member of the Glenelg Surf Life Saving Club, undertaking regular patrols along Adelaide's coastline.

Parliament of South Australia
Preceded by Duncan McFetridge	Member for Morphett; 2018–2026	Succeeded by Toby Priest
Political offices
Preceded by David Ridgway	Minister for Trade and Investment; 2020–2022	Succeeded by Nick Champion
