= Toby Priest =

Australian politician (born 1974/5)

Toby Priest MP
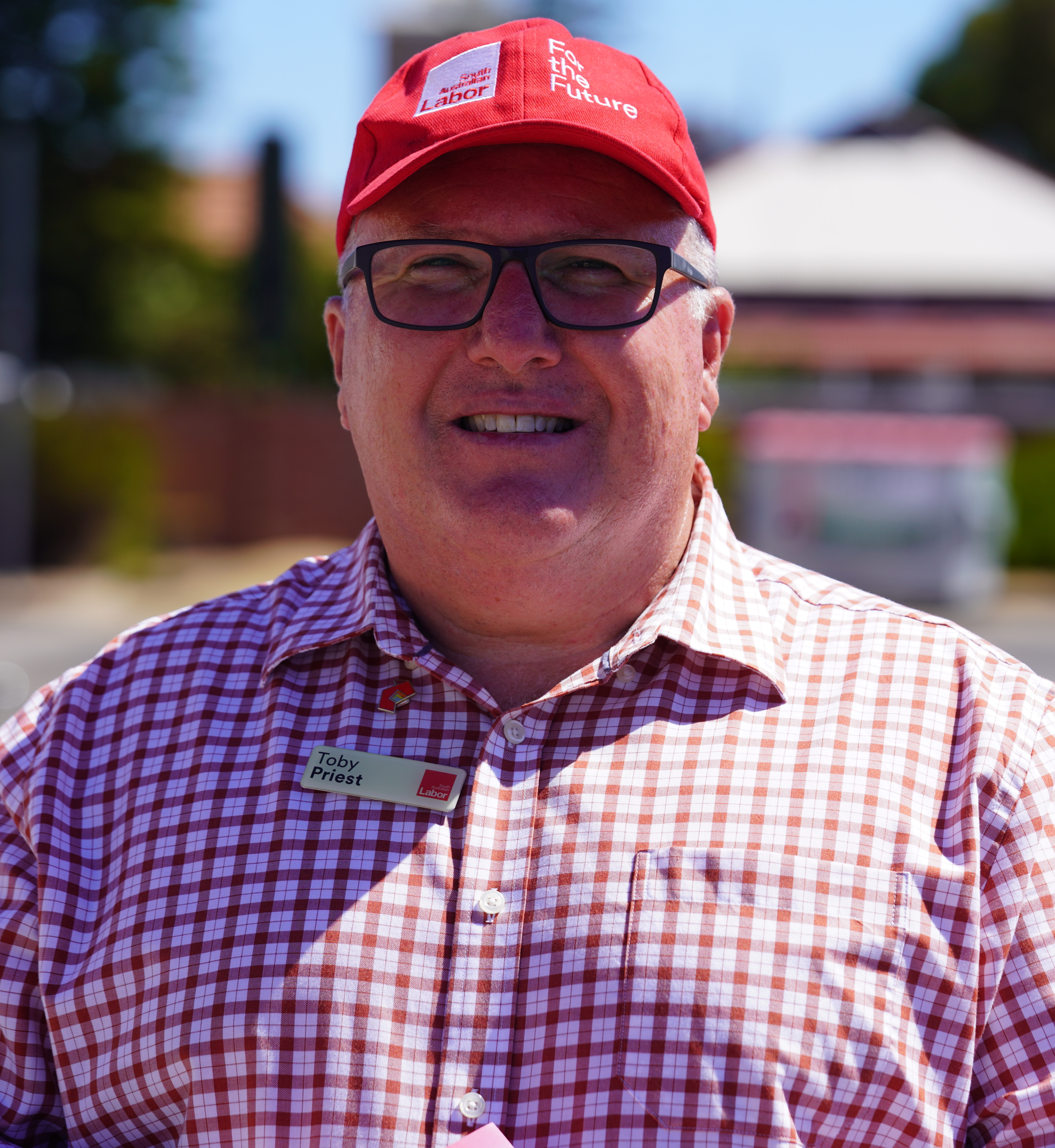
- Priest in 2026

Member of the South Australian House of Assembly for Morphett
- Incumbent
- Assumed office 21 March 2026
- Preceded by: Stephen Patterson

Personal details
- Born: Toby Priest; 1974 or 1975 (age 51–52)
- Party: Labor
- Children: 3

Tobias Michael Priest (born 1974 or 1975) is an Australian politician and teacher, and has represented the district of Morphett in the South Australian House of Assembly since the 2026 state election. Priest is a member of the Australian Labor Party, and previously worked in various teaching roles, including at Flinders University.

== Life and career ==
Priest is a father of three children.

Then a tutor of 16 years at Flinders University, Priest brought an unsuccessful case before the Fair Work Commission in 2022, contending that his employer should offer him a permanent part-time position, rather than the casual position he currently held. Priest's case was the first test of industrial reform laws passed by the Morrison government in March 2021, which was supposed to allow casual workers easier access to permanent positions, but Priest's case was unsuccessful on the grounds that it would cause "significant adjustment" for his employer. Priest told The Age that his position as a casual employee created "constant uncertainty".

Priest was announced in June 2025 as a Labor candidate in the 2026 state election, standing in the district of Morphett, held by Liberal MP Stephen Patterson. At the time, Priest was a teacher at St Thomas School and a boarding supervisor at Immanuel College. According to The Advertiser, Priest owns two homes: one in Glenelg within the Morphett electorate, and one in Goodwood, in the Unley electorate, the former of which he bought a month before his announcement as a Labor candidate. Priest was successful at the 2026 state election, defeating Patterson to become the MP for Morphett.

South Australian House of Assembly
Preceded by Stephen Patterson	Member for Morphett; 2026–present	Incumbent
