= Duncan McFetridge =

Australian politician (born 1952)

Duncan McFetridge MP
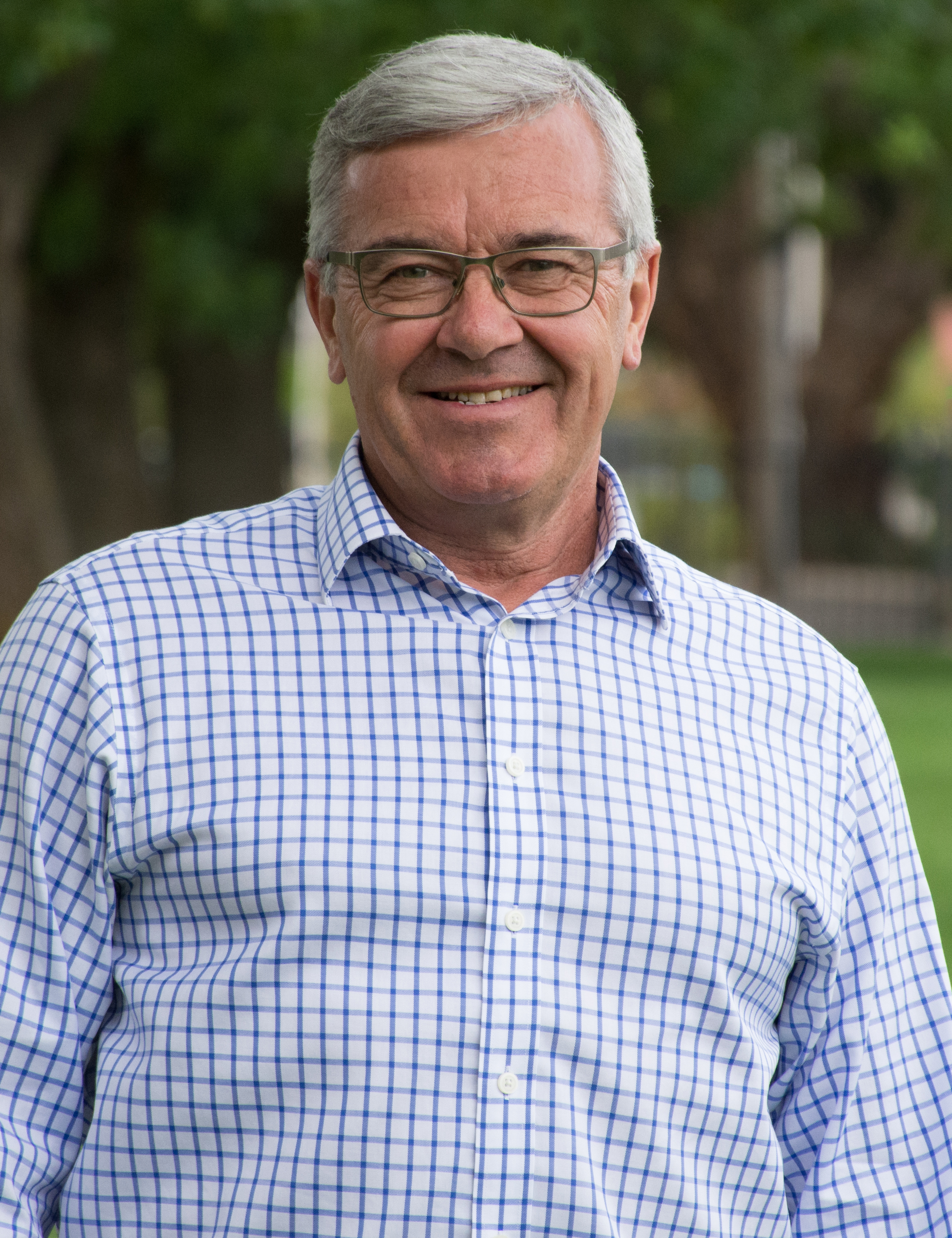

Member of the South Australian Parliament for Morphett
- In office 9 February 2002 – 17 March 2018
- Preceded by: John Oswald
- Succeeded by: Stephen Patterson

Personal details
- Born: 27 January 1952 (age 74) Leicester, England, United Kingdom
- Party: Liberal (2002–2017; 2018—present); Independent (2017–2018)
- Spouse: Johanna
- Children: Two
- Education: University of Adelaide; Murdoch University
- Profession: Veterinarian

Duncan McFetridge (born 27 January 1952) is an Australian politician who represented the South Australian House of Assembly seat of Morphett for the Liberal Party from the 2002 election until 2018. Entering shadow cabinet in 2004, he was re-elected at the 2006, 2010 and 2014 elections, and holds the seat with a margin of 12.9 points. This was reduced to 7.7 points following the 2016 redistribution. McFetridge lost his shadow cabinet position in January 2017.

McFetridge resigned from the Liberals and moved to the crossbench as an independent in May 2017 after losing endorsement for Morphett pre-selection ahead of the 2018 election.

== Early career ==
McFetridge worked as a high school teacher for four years, teaching woodwork and metalwork at Port Augusta and Minlaton High Schools. In 1979 McFetridge began studying veterinary science, graduating in 1982. He then worked with racehorses, and later in horse and livestock transport. Duncan then ran a veterinary practice in the Chandlers Hill/Happy Valley area.

== Parliament ==
Early in his career Dr McFetridge introduced a private members Bill to ban tail docking of dogs. The Bill was the first Opposition Private Member's Bill to be given Government time for debate in the history of the SA Parliament. The then Labor Government introduced a ban on tail docking.

He was a member of the Statutory Officers Committee and is the longest serving member of the Aboriginal Lands Parliamentary Standing Committee, appointed from 2003 to 2010 and was re-appointed in 2012 to 2017. He has been a member of three House of Assembly Select Committees – Jumps Racing; Dogs and Cats as Companion Animals; and Review of the Retirement Villages Act 1987. He was also Deputy Opposition Whip in the House of Assembly from 2002 until 2004.

Dr McFetridge had previously held the Shadow Portfolios of Communities & Social Inclusion, Disabilities, Emergency Services, Veterans' Affairs, Aboriginal Affairs & Reconciliation, Social Housing, Volunteers, Mental Health & Substance Abuse, Suicide Prevention, Youth, Transport & Infrastructure, Police, Correctional Services, Road Safety, Health, Industrial Relations, Science & Information Economy, Industry & Trade, Education & Children's Services, the Arts, Tourism, Local Government, Recreation & Sport, Consumer Affairs, and Small Business.

After 13 years, Dr McFetridge lost his position in the Steven Marshall shadow cabinet and moved to the backbench in January 2017.

Dr McFetridge announced on 1 May 2017 that he would resign from the Liberals and move to the crossbench as an independent after losing Liberal pre-selection in Morphett for the 2018 election to City of Holdfast Bay mayor Stephen Patterson. Mr Patterson beat Dr McFetridge by one vote after his name was drawn ‘out of a hat’as he and the other contender were even behind McFetridge on primary votes. The following month, Dr McFetridge announced he would re-contest Morphett as an independent. He was pushed into third place on the primary vote, but his preferences flowed overwhelmingly to Patterson, allowing the Liberals to reclaim the seat.

== Personal life ==
McFetridge grew up in the Adelaide suburbs of Elizabeth and Salisbury. He attended Salisbury High School, and then went on to study at Western Teachers College. McFetridge is a current member and a former captain of the South Australian Country Fire Service, and a member of many other community clubs, including Rotary. His other interests include sailing, surfing and personal fitness. He is married, with two adult children, and has two grandchildren.

South Australian House of Assembly
Preceded by John Oswald	Member for Morphett; 2002–2018	Succeeded by Stephen Patterson
