= Camden Park, South Australia =

Camden Park
- Suburb
- Country: Australia
- State: South Australia
- City: Adelaide
- LGA: City of West Torrens
- Location: 8.3 km (5.2 mi) SW of Adelaide city centre

Government
  - State electorate: Morphett
  - Federal division: Hindmarsh

Population
  - Total: 3,338 (SAL 2021)
- Postcode: 5038
Suburbs around Camden Park
Novar Gardens	North Plympton	North Plympton
Novar Gardens	Camden Park	Plympton
Glengowrie	Morphettville	Plympton Park

Camden Park is a suburb of the city of Adelaide, South Australia.

Camden Park is in the City of West Torrens local government area. It is split between the South Australian House of Assembly electoral districts of Ashford and West Torrens. At the federal level, Camden Park is in the Division of Hindmarsh.

Camden Park Post Office closed in 1990.

== History ==
Camden Park originated through the sale of subdivisions in the hundred of Adelaide throughout 1911. The geographical boundaries of the suburb were then furthered through the sale of subdivisions of the estate of Rev. George Stone in 1914.
