= Electoral district of Morphett =

State electoral district of South Australia

Morphett South Australia—House of Assembly
- Interactive map of electoral district boundaries from the 2022 state election (Note: The electorate will have no change in boundaries at the 2026 state election.)
- State: South Australia
- Created: 1977
- MP: Toby Priest
- Party: Labor
- Namesake: Sir John Morphett
- Electors: 26,419 (2018)
- Area: 14 km^{2} (5.4 sq mi)
- Demographic: Metropolitan
- Coordinates: 34°58′1″S 138°31′19″E
Electorates around Morphett:
| Gulf St Vincent | Colton | Badcoe |
| Gulf St Vincent | Morphett | Badcoe |
| Gulf St Vincent | Gibson | Elder |

Morphett is a single-member electoral district for the South Australian House of Assembly. The electorate is located approximately 10 kilometres (6.2 mi) slightly south of west of the Adelaide city centre, bounded by the Holdfast Bay coastline to the west and Marion Road to the east. It is approximately 14 km^{2} (5.4 sq mi) in area, and includes the suburbs of Camden Park, Glenelg, Glenelg East, Glenelg North, Glenelg South, Glengowrie, Morphettville, Novar Gardens, and Park Holme, as well as a portion of Somerton Park.

Created in 1976 following the electoral redistribution which took effect from the 1977 election, the electoral district was named after Sir John Morphett (1809–1892) who lived in the Morphettville area and was speaker of the enlarged Legislative Council in 1851, and president of the elected Legislative Council from 1865 to 1873.

On its creation, Morphett was a notionally marginal Liberal electorate. However, it was won by the Dunstan Labor government in its landslide 1977 election victory, and was Labor's only marginal seat. The Liberals won it at the 1979 election and have held it ever since. The Liberal hold on the electorate was considerably strengthened when the safe Liberal seat of Glenelg was abolished at the 1983 redistribution and largely merged with Morphett.

Duncan McFetridge resigned from the Liberal Party and moved to the crossbench as an independent in May 2017 after losing Liberal pre-selection for Morphett to City of Holdfast Bay mayor Stephen Patterson ahead of the 2018 election. Patterson was successful at the election.

After the 2026 state election, Toby Priest became the first South Australian Labor member to win the seat since the 1970s, after a close contest with incumbent Liberal MP, Stephen Patterson.

== Members for Morphett ==
| Member | Party | Term |
|---|---|---|
| Terry Groom | Labor | 1977–1979 |
| John Oswald | Liberal | 1979–2002 |
| Duncan McFetridge | Liberal | 2002–2017 |
| Duncan McFetridge | Independent | 2017–2018 |
| Stephen Patterson | Liberal | 2018–2026 |
| Toby Priest | Labor | 2026–present |

== Election results ==
2026 South Australian state election: Morphett
| Party | Candidate | Votes | % | ±% |
|---|---|---|---|---|
| Labor | Toby Priest | 8,052 | 35.9 | +0.3 |
| Liberal | Stephen Patterson | 7,857 | 35.1 | −16.6 |
| One Nation | Tim March | 3,413 | 15.2 | +15.2 |
| Greens | Isabella Litt | 2,303 | 10.3 | −2.4 |
| Animal Justice | Ren Ryba | 288 | 1.3 | +1.3 |
| Australian Family | Craig Attard | 274 | 1.2 | +1.2 |
| Real Change | Tim Birdseye | 155 | 0.7 | +0.7 |
| Fair Go | Maria Ruta | 72 | 0.3 | +0.3 |
| Total formal votes | | 22,414 | 96.3 | −1.2 |
| Informal votes | | 837 | 3.7 | +1.2 |
| Turnout | | 23,281 | 89.3 | +0.5 |
Two-party-preferred result
| Labor | Toby Priest | 11,360 | 50.7 | +5.2 |
| Liberal | Stephen Patterson | 11,054 | 49.3 | −5.2 |
| Labor gain from Liberal | | Swing | +5.2 | |
