= Novar Gardens, South Australia =

Novar Gardens
- Suburb
- Coordinates: 34°58′01″S 138°31′53″E
- Country: Australia
- State: South Australia
- City: Adelaide
- LGA: City of West Torrens

Government
  - State electorate: Morphett
  - Federal division: Hindmarsh

Population
  - Total: 2,508 (SAL 2021)
- Postcode: 5040
Suburbs around Novar Gardens
Adelaide Airport	Adelaide Airport	North Plympton
Glenelg North	Novar Gardens	Camden Park
Glenelg East	Glenelg East	Camden Park

Novar Gardens is an inner south-western suburb of Adelaide, South Australia, in the City of West Torrens.

Originally to be called Morphettville, the name was changed to honour the family estate of Ronald Munro Ferguson, 1st Viscount Novar, Governor-General of Australia from 1914 to 1920, who visited the site of the future suburb in 1919. On his return to Britain, Munro Ferguson was created 1st Viscount Novar.

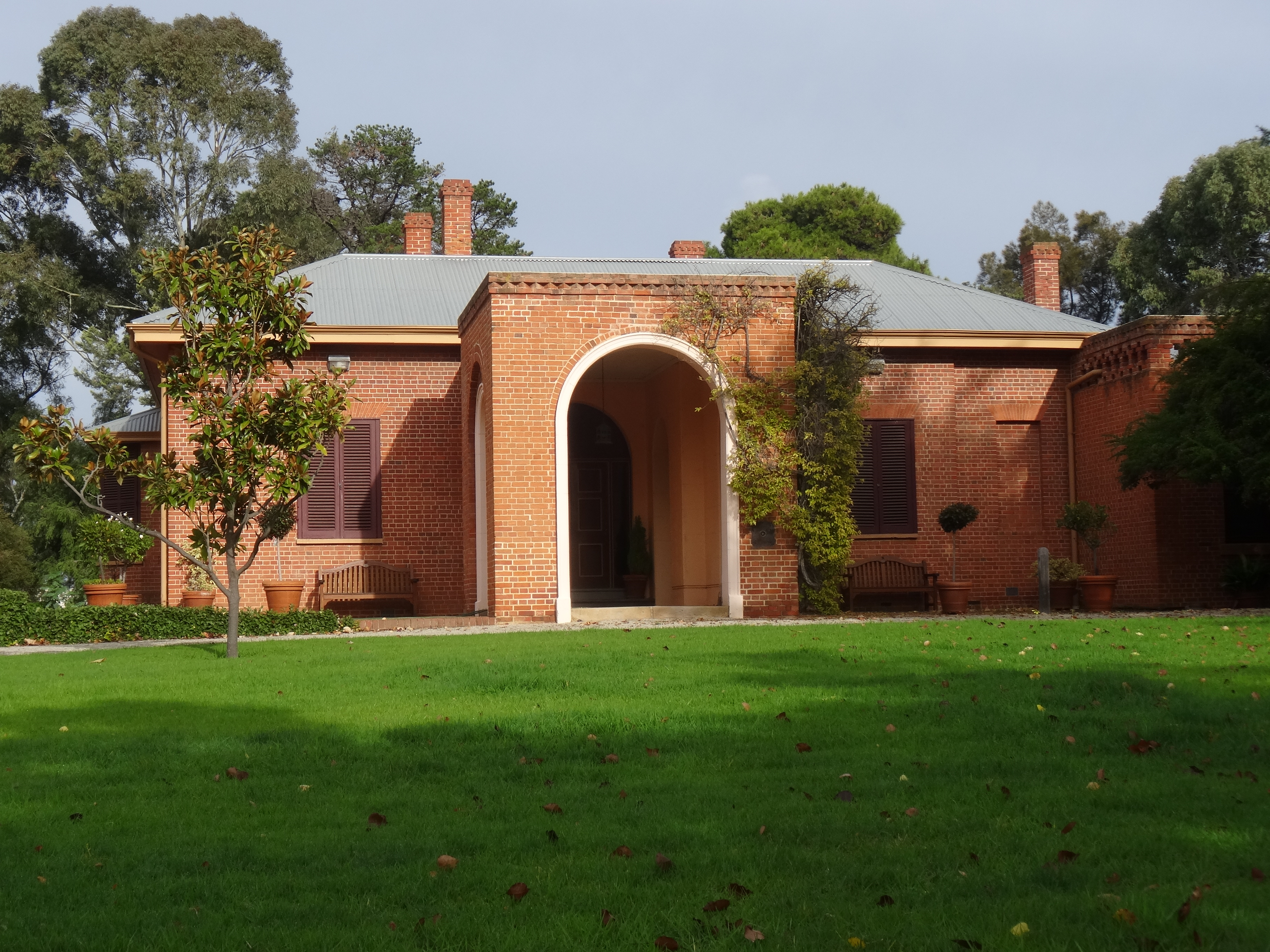
Cummins House in Novar Gardens

The historic Cummins House in Sheoak Avenue is listed on the South Australian Heritage Register.

== Sport ==
Novar Gardens has a significant sporting presence, with the Camden Oval, which hosts the PHOS Camden Football Club, the Camden Sports Complex, which hosts the West Torrens Birkalla SC and the Immanuel College, Adelaide sports centre.

The Camden Oval once had a motorcycle speedway track around it from 28 December 1935 to 1941. The venue hosted the Australian Solo Championship in 1938.
