= Woodcroft, South Australia =

Woodcroft
- Suburb
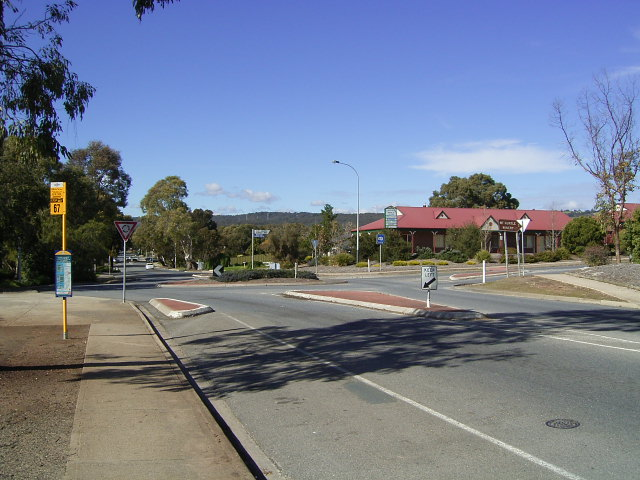
- Looking east on Reynell Road in Woodcroft

- Coordinates: 35.100°S 138.55°E
- Country: Australia
- State: South Australia
- Region: Southern Adelaide
- City: Adelaide
- LGA: City of Onkaparinga
- Location: 20 km (12 mi) from Adelaide
- Established: 1969

Government
  - State electorate: Hurtle Vale
  - Federal division: Kingston

Population
  - Total: 11,326 (SAL 2021)
- Postcode: 5162
- County: Adelaide
Suburbs around Woodcroft
Old Reynella	Reynella East	Happy Valley
Morphett Vale	Woodcroft	Chandlers Hill
Hackham	Onkaparinga Hills	Clarendon

Woodcroft is a metropolitan suburb of Adelaide, South Australia, located 20 km south of the Central Business District of Adelaide. It is bordered to the north by Reynell Road, to the south by Bains Road, to the west by Panalatinga Road and by the Hills Face Zone to the east. The Panalatinga Creek also runs through the suburb.

== History ==
The first Europeans settled in 1869 by Robert Wright and his wife Mary, who built a small limestone and mud dwelling on 20 acres (81,000 m^{2}) of land 3 km east of John Reynell's settlement at Reynella.

In 1897 vigneron Richard Mostyn Owen (c1874-1941) established his Mount Hurtle winery and built a homestead called Woodcroft Farm, from which the suburb took its name.

Although traces of Wright's dwelling still exist in a small park named after him, and Mount Hurtle is a still a boutique winery, both settlements passed out of their respective families in the 1970s into the hands of the South Australian Lands Commission and the entire area was subdivided into housing in the early 1

In 2007 the Vines caravan park which was located on Sir James Hardy Way closed to make way for a retirement village. Woodcroft Park caravan park is still operating and is located at Lot 1 Bains Road Woodcroft 5162.

== Demographics ==
Woodcroft is considered a working middle class suburb with a high proportion of residents employed as Intermediate Clerical, Sales and Service Workers and in Retail Trade. Demographically, Woodcroft is dominated by young, Australian-born families purchasing their own home (60% of the population is below 40 years of age).

== Schools ==
Woodcroft has a single state-run primary school "Woodcroft Primary School". Public students living in Woodcroft are zoned into the nearby high schools, "Reynella East College" formerly known as "Reynella East High School" and Wirreanda High School. "Woodcroft Primary School" has 44 class rooms with about 1000 students.

Woodcroft College is an Anglican combined primary and secondary school in the area, although it is technically located in Morphett Vale.

== Transport ==
Woodcroft is serviced by the 733/732/723/722 buses as well as an Adelaide Metro Transit Link service and the bus interchange station in Reynella. It is not serviced by any active train lines, the nearest station being Lonsdale, 8 km to the west of Woodcroft, on the Seaford railway line.
