= Patrick Jonker Veloway =

Cycleway in South Australia

Patrick Jonkers Veloway
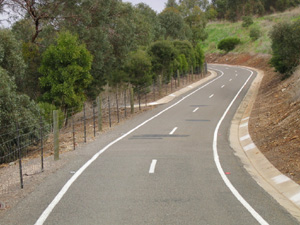
- The Southern Veloway near its start south of the Seacombe Road bridge, at Marion
- Established: 22 February 1998

The Patrick Jonker Veloway (formerly known as the Adelaide Southern Veloway) is a sealed bikeway for the exclusive use of cyclists that runs continuously alongside the Southern Expressway for a distance of 7 km — from Marion/Main South Road to the Panalatinga Tunnel. South of the Panalatinga Tunnel, the bikeway becomes a shared track for the remaining 12 km of the Southern Expressway. It provides important links to other cycling facilities in the area, notably the Sturt River recreational trail at the Veloway's northern end, and the Coast to Vines rail trail at both Panalatinga Road and Southern end of the shared track. The Northern end of veloway links to the Sturt River shared path, providing an almost non-stop bicycle route between Glenelg and Willunga.

The Veloway was officially opened on Sunday 22 February 1998 by Transport Minister, Diana Laidlaw MLC. The Veloway is a legal entity that accords with the South Australian Road Traffic Act and only people on bicycles are permitted to use the facility. The Veloway has challenging inclines in both directions of travel and a well-maintained coarse asphalt surface. The southern end is at a higher elevation than the northern end, making a transit in the northerly direction the easiest. The Veloway has views of the Adelaide metropolitan coastline, Adelaide plains and Glenthorne Farm. Cyclists normally do not encounter pedestrians or vehicles on the Veloway, making it one of the safest transit corridors to ride in Adelaide.

== Shared Track ==
The shared track, which is identical in construction and markings to the Veloway, passes atop rolling hills through the suburbs of Reynella, Morphett Vale, and Hackham. However it does not utilise the Southern Expressway's Sherriffs Road overpass. There is a traffic light crossing at Sherriffs Road; on the other side is a narrower bitumen path leading to a crossing at Brodie Road, which it runs adjacent to before rejoining the expressway and taking on its familiar appearance.
