= Aberfoyle Park High School =

Coordinates: 35.052922°S 138.618602°E

- Aberfoyle Park, South Australia; Australia

Information
- Type: Public
- Motto: Respect, Care & Compassion and Honesty
- Established: 1984
- Principal: Marion Coady
- Enrolment: 995 (2024)
- Campus: Suburban
- Colours: Year 8–11: maroon, black and white Year 12: white and black
- Website: intra.aphs.sa.edu.au

Aberfoyle Park High School is a large public secondary schools in the southern suburbs of Adelaide, the capital of South Australia. Its facilities include the community library, performing arts centre, gymnasium, and information and communication technology facilities. The school also focuses on extending gifted students through the Ignite (formerly SHIP) programme.

Aberfoyle Park High School has become a centre for international students, resulting in strong relationships with several schools in other countries.

== History ==
Aberfoyle Park High School was built in 1983 and opened in 1984 to service the growing suburbs of Aberfoyle Park, Happy Valley, Flagstaff Hill and other surrounding suburbs. An extra two buildings were completed in 1984 for science and English/computing studies at the school. In 1986, Elizabeth II visited the school inspecting the facilities and meeting the students. In 1987 a new computing facility was opened providing computers for the students. The school grew throughout the 1990s to a peak of over 1500 students and in the late 1990s, the school expanded to include the former primary school site, in the south-east of the original site.

Aberfoyle Park High School celebrated its 20th anniversary in 2004.

== Partnerships ==
In 2008, Aberfoyle Park High School entered into a partnership with defence contractor, Raytheon Australia to provide $450,000 funding over the next 3 years for the purchase of new computers for IGNITE, science and maths students at the school. The partnership was launched at the school in November 2008 by the Premier Mike Rann and Raytheon Australia managing director, Ron Fisher.

== Notable alumni ==
Sport

- Adam Cooney – former professional Australian rules footballer for the Western Bulldogs (2004–2014), Essendon (2015–2016) and 2008 Brownlow Medallist.
- Nathan Eagleton – former professional Australian rules footballer for Port Adelaide (1997–1999) and Western Bulldogs (2000–2010).
- Ben Hale – Australian Korfball team representative including 2007 World Championships.
- Brad Marks – Australian Korfball team representative including 2007 World Championships.
- Ben Marsh – former Australian rules footballer for Adelaide (1998–2003) and Richmond (2004).
- Brenton Sanderson – former coach of Adelaide (2012–2014) and former professional Australian rules footballer for Adelaide (1992–1993), Collingwood (1994) and Geelong (1995–2005).
- Beau Waters – former professional Australian rules footballer for West Coast (2004–2015).
- Caleb Daniel – Australian rules footballer for the Western Bulldogs (2015–present).

Music

- Andy Strachan – Drummer for The Living End, multiple ARIA Award winner (2002–present).
- Michael Green – Multi-instrumentalist, vocalist The Audreys, multiple ARIA Award winner (2003–2010).
- Kynan Johns – Conductor, currently Director of Orchetras at Rutgers University
