= Southern Expressway =

Southern Expressway may refer to:

- Southern Expressway, Adelaide, South Australia
- E01 expressway (Sri Lanka)
- A portion of U.S. Route 219 in New York
- A portion of Interstate 376 near Pittsburgh
- Southern Expressway (England), a road in Runcorn, Cheshire and part of the A533 road.
