= Aberfoyle Park, South Australia =

Aberfoyle Park
- Suburb
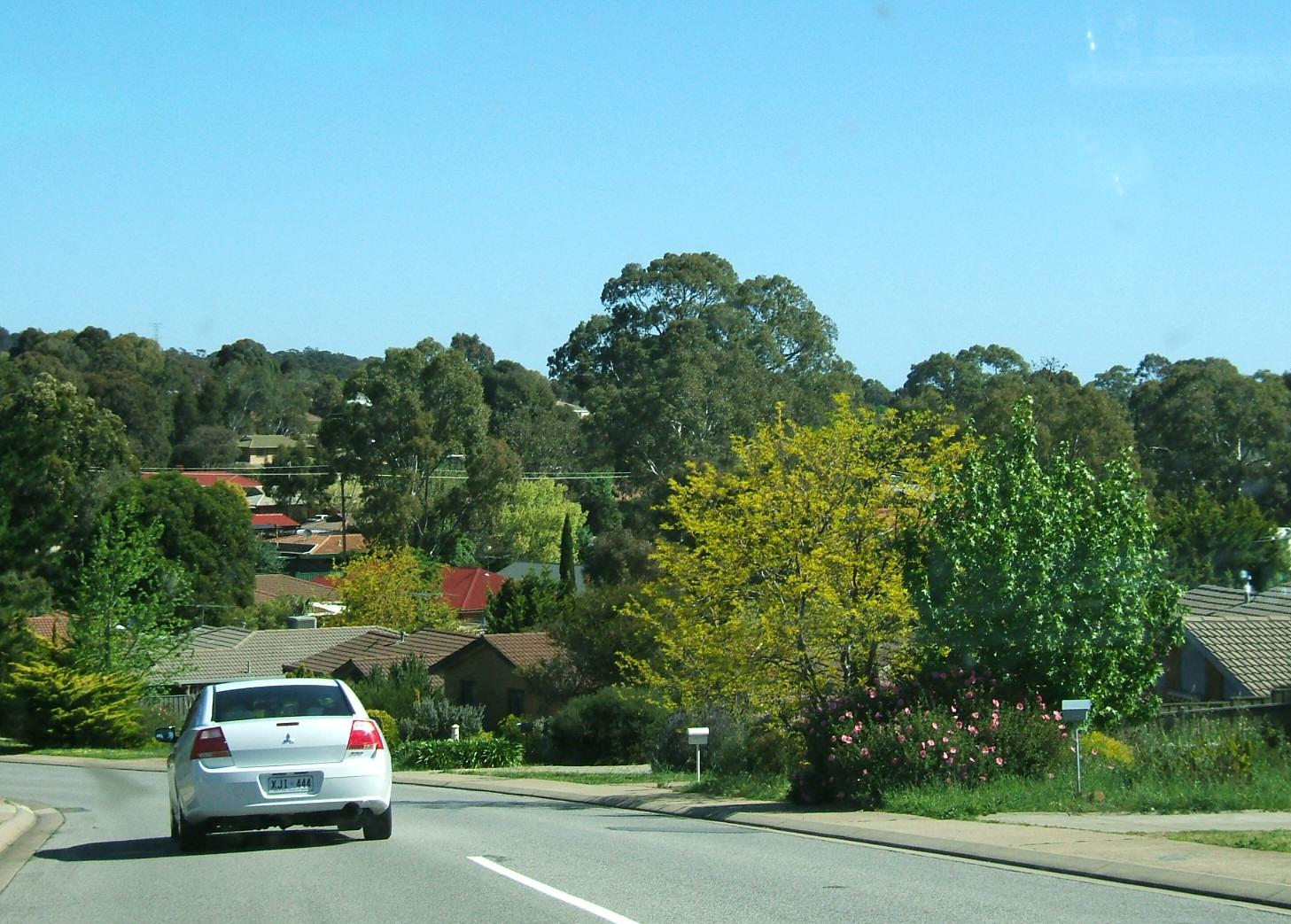
- Jeanette Crescent

- Country: Australia
- State: South Australia
- Region: Southern Adelaide
- City: Adelaide
- LGA: City of Onkaparinga
- Location: 20 km (12 mi) from Adelaide
- Established: 1980

Government
  - State electorate: Davenport
  - Federal division: Kingston

Population
  - Total: 11,234 (SAL 2021)
- Postcode: 5159
- County: Adelaide
Suburbs around Aberfoyle Park
Flagstaff Hill	Flagstaff Hill	Coromandel Valley
Happy Valley	Aberfoyle Park	Chandlers Hill
Happy Valley	Happy Valley	Chandlers Hill

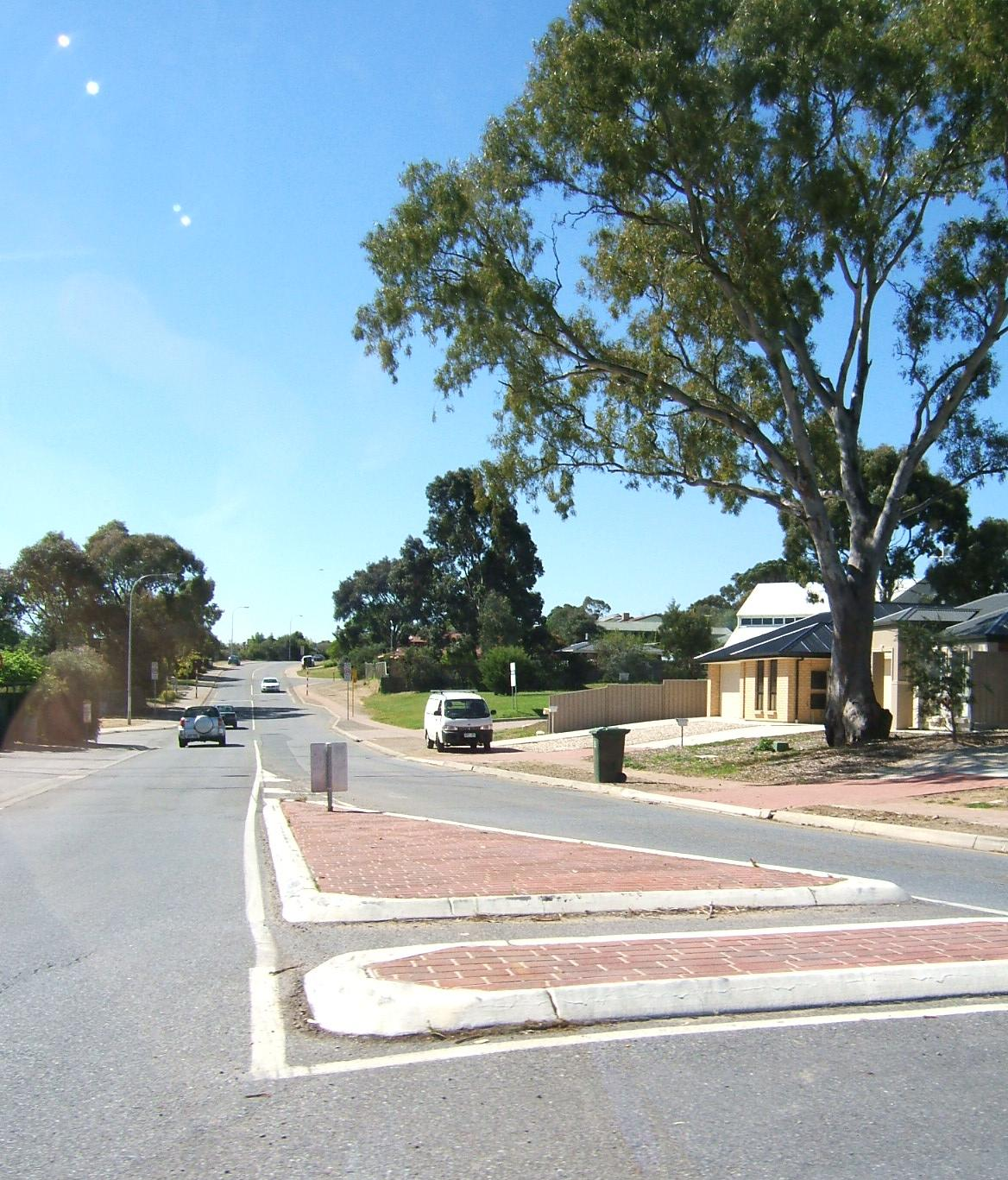
Hub Drive, Aberfoyle Park.

Aberfoyle Park /ˈæbərfɔɪl/ is a suburb in the City of Onkaparinga in the state of South Australia. It is located in the southern suburbs of Adelaide, approximately 20 km from the city centre. Aberfoyle Park has a shopping mall called "The Hub", several primary schools and a public high school, one of the biggest in the state.

Aberfoyle Park is served by the Adelaide Metro bus routes G20, G21 and G22X, which connect the suburb to Adelaide's city centre. It is also served by 320, 600 and 601 routes which connect the suburb to Old Reynella, Blackwood and Marion Centre, and the 737 providing connections to Chandlers Hill and Old Reynella.

== History ==
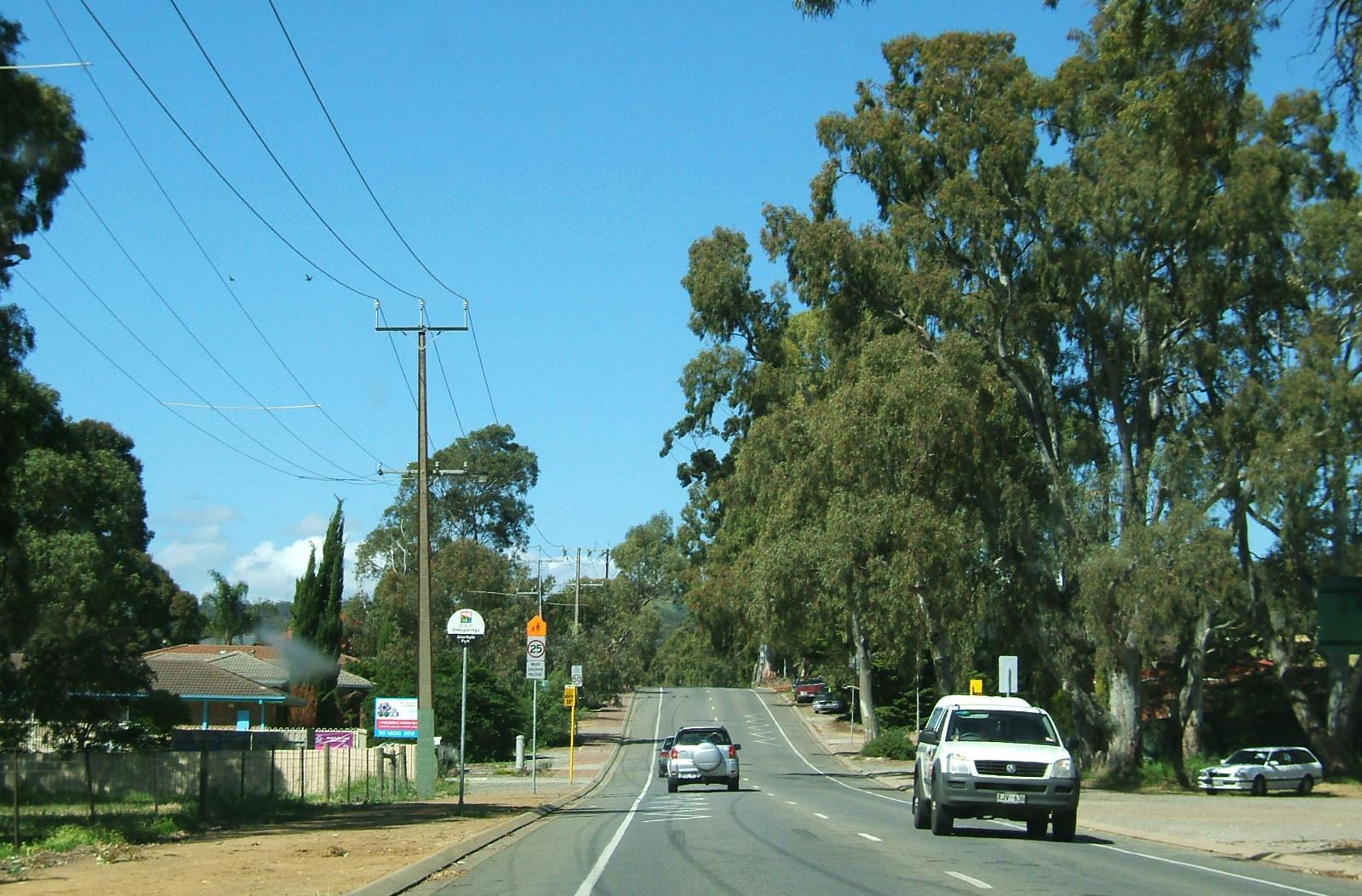
Windebanks Road

In 1845, Christian Sauerbier, from Germany, purchased land south of Adelaide, near Happy Valley. In 1856, Sauerbier owned eleven sections of land in the area. The area became agricultural and the Sauerbier family was renowned for the quality of their stud stock and the orange grove that was attached to their property. Christian Sauerbier died in 1893 and the property passed to his son, John Chris.

During the First World War, when anti-German sentiment was at a high in Australia, Chris changed his last name to Aberfoyle, a potential reference to the Scottish village of Aberfoyle where his father had previously lived. John Chris died in 1923 and his estate was subdivided and sold by James Henry Browne.

Agriculture was the core of the district's economy for quite some time. Inevitably, the farmlands were turned into suburban expansion and the suburb of Aberfoyle Park was proclaimed on 10 July 1980. The Aberfoyle Park Post Office opened on 16 November 1981.

== Geography ==
The suburb is located in the Adelaide Hills, giving the area a hilly terrain. Parks located in the suburb include Thalassa Park.

== Governance ==
Aberfoyle Park is part of the City of Onkaparinga. It is in the South Australian House of Assembly (state) electoral district of Davenport, whose current member is Erin Thompson, and the Australian House of Representatives (federal) Division of Kingston, whose representative is Amanda Rishworth.

== Education ==
- The Aberfoyle Park Primary School Campus consists of 3 primary schools - State School 'Thiele', Catholic Education school 'Nativity', and the Uniting Church school 'Pilgrim' and Preschool all on the same grounds. There is a strong vision and spirit of cooperation and collaboration between the three schools.
- Aberfoyle Hub Primary School is a public R-7 school. It is notable for its success in the Pedal prix. The school's team, "The Hubcaps", have multiple consecutive wins in the Junior category of the race.
- Aberfoyle Park High School is one of the largest secondary schools in South Australia. It is a public high school for Year 7-12 students.

== Sport ==
The Happy Valley sports park, which is located near Aberfoyle Park High School, contains the Happy Valley Football Club who are known as the Vikings, the Happy Valley Cricket Club, the Happy Valley Tennis Club, a lawn bowls club, a BMX club with a track and the Aberfoyle Park Scout group.

The Aberfoyle Park hub has a YMCA, which runs many community events such as volleyball.

== Media ==
Aberfoyle Park has a local FM radio station, Easy FM 88, playing a mixture of Country, Easy Listening and Nostalgia.
