= Richard Mostyn Owen =

Winemaker and horse racing enthusiast

- Born: 18 June 1874; Baschurch, Shropshire, England
- Died: 10 November 1941 (aged 67); Mount Hurtle Vineyard, Reynella, South Australia, Australia
- Resting place: O'Halloran Hill Cemetery, Marion, South Australia
- Occupation(s): Winemaker, horse racing enthusiast
- Known for: Founder of Mount Hurtle Winery

Richard Mostyn Owen (18 June 1874 – 10 November 1941) was an English-born Australian winemaker and horse racing enthusiast. He was the founder and proprietor of Mount Hurtle Winery in South Australia, which he managed until his death.

== Early life ==
Owen was born on 18 June 1874 in Baschurch, Shropshire, England. He was the son of Edward Henry Mostyn-Owen (1824–1904), a member of the Mostyn-Owen family of the Shropshire landed gentry, and Mary Susan Parker (1836–1893), a niece of naturalist Charles Darwin. He was notably named as Darwin’s godson.

== Career ==
After emigrating to South Australia, Mostyn Owen settled in the Reynella district, south of Adelaide. He purchased a 200-acre vineyard in at Hurtle Vale from Charles Chapple in 1896. The winery operated under the name Messrs R. Mostyn Owen and Co., which he managed until his death in 1941. In 1907 it was reported to have 100,000 gallons of storage for wine.

The winery later became derelict and was purchased in 1985 by Geoff Merrill, who redeveloped the site as a working winery.

Mostyn Owen established a house near the winery, which he called Woodcroft Farm. This went on to become the name for the suburb of Woodcroft, which was established in the 1980s, largely on the site of the vineyards.

== Horse racing ==
Owen was active in horse racing as a trainer and member of the committee of the Adelaide racing club from 1922. His horse, Wassail, placed third in the 1913 Caulfield Cup.

== Death ==
Richard Mostyn Owen died on 10 November 1941 at Mount Hurtle Vineyard, South Australia, aged 67. He was buried at O’Halloran Hill Cemetery, South Australia.

== See also ==
- Geoff Merrill Wines
- South Australian wine
