= Woodcroft College =

Location
- Morphett Vale, South Australia; Australia; 35°06′49.32″S 138°32′37.68″E

Information
- Type: Independent; Private; Co-educational; International; Primary; Secondary; Day school
- Motto: Latin: Persevera in Fide (Persevere in Faith)
- Denomination: Anglican
- Established: 1989 (37 years)
- Principal: S Warren
- Employees: ~177
- Enrolment: ~1377 (R–12)
- Colours: Red, navy blue & gold
- Slogan: Persevera in Fide
- Affiliation: Sports Association for Adelaide Schools
- Website: www.woodcroft.sa.edu.au

Woodcroft College is an independent, private Anglican, co-educational, international, day school for students from ELC to Year 12, located on Bains Road in the southern Adelaide suburb of Morphett Vale, South Australia. Despite being named for the southern Adelaide suburb of Woodcroft, the college is situated in the suburb of Morphett Vale. Founded in 1989, Woodcroft College celebrated its Silver Jubilee in 2014 after 25 years of operation.

== College emblem and colours ==
The Woodcroft College emblem has individual elements that represent a particular value: an empty cross as a sign for hope; a serpent as a reminder of faith; a heart-shaped shield as a token of love; and a 'W' inside the cross representing the Woodcroft College Community.

The Woodcroft College colours of navy blue and gold are associated with the school's patron saint, Hilda of Whitby, while the red is a liturgical (seasonal) colour of the Christian churches.

== House system ==
Upon commencement at Woodcroft College, each student is assigned to one of the four houses with all other members of a family being assigned to the same house. The House System acts as the focus for families, sport and student leadership in the three Sub-Schools. In the Junior School, the houses support sporting, cultural and co-curricular activities and its students compete within their classes and year levels earning points for their house in the annual Junior School Sports Day situated on campus. In the Middle and Senior Schools, the houses compete against each other in the annual Interhouse Swimming Carnival located at the South Australia Aquatic and Leisure Centre since 2012, and Interhouse Athletics Carnival located at SA Athletics Stadium. Middle School students also compete in house activities once every term - where students are split into several groups within their year level with each group consisting of students from the four houses - to earn further points for their house. The names of the four houses originated from famous influences and areas situated near or around the college.

House name	Colour	Namesake (respectively named suburb/region)
Reynell	Red	John Reynell (Reynella)
Morphett	Royal blue	John Morphett (Morphett Vale)
McLaren	Gold	David McLaren (McLaren Vale)
Hardy	Bottle green	Thomas Hardy (Hardy Wine Company)

== Notable alumni ==
- Charlotte Grant, Australian professional soccer player
- Kurtis Marschall, Australian Olympic pole vaulter

== See also ==
- List of schools in South Australia
