= Panalatinga Creek =

Panalatinga
- Location of the river mouth in South Australia
- Etymology: Kaurna word

Location
- Country: Australia
- State: South Australia
- Region: Adelaide

Physical characteristics
- Source: Mount Lofty Ranges
  - location: Bald Hill
  - elevation: 589 m (1,932 ft)
- Mouth: confluence with the Field River
  - location: south of Hallett Cove
  - coordinates: 35°05′16″S 138°32′03″E
  - elevation: 490 m (1,610 ft)
- Length: 9 km (5.6 mi)

Basin features
- River system: Onkaparinga River

The Panalatinga Creek is an urban watercourse in the southern suburbs of Adelaide in the Australian state of South Australia.

== Course and features ==
Part of the Onkaparinga River catchment area that drains the western slopes of the Mount Lofty Ranges, the creek rises in the foothills in the southern Adelaide suburbs around Chandlers Hill through to Trott Park, South Australia and reaches its confluence with the Field River near the Southern Expressway. Now no more than a narrow suburban watercourse, Panalatinga Creek's earliest European recorded use was as the source of water for John Reynell's early vineyards around his Chateau Reynella homestead in 1849.

== Etymology ==
The name of the creek is derived from the Kaurna language word of Pandlotinga, and is sometimes mispronounced as Panatalinga.

== See also ==
- List of rivers of Australia § South Australia
- Panalatinga Road
