= Disappearance of Rhianna Barreau =

Missing Australian girl since 1992

- Date: 7 October 1992
- Time: 12:30 pm
- Location: Morphett Vale, South Australia
- Type: Abduction
- Missing: Rhianna Barreau (12)

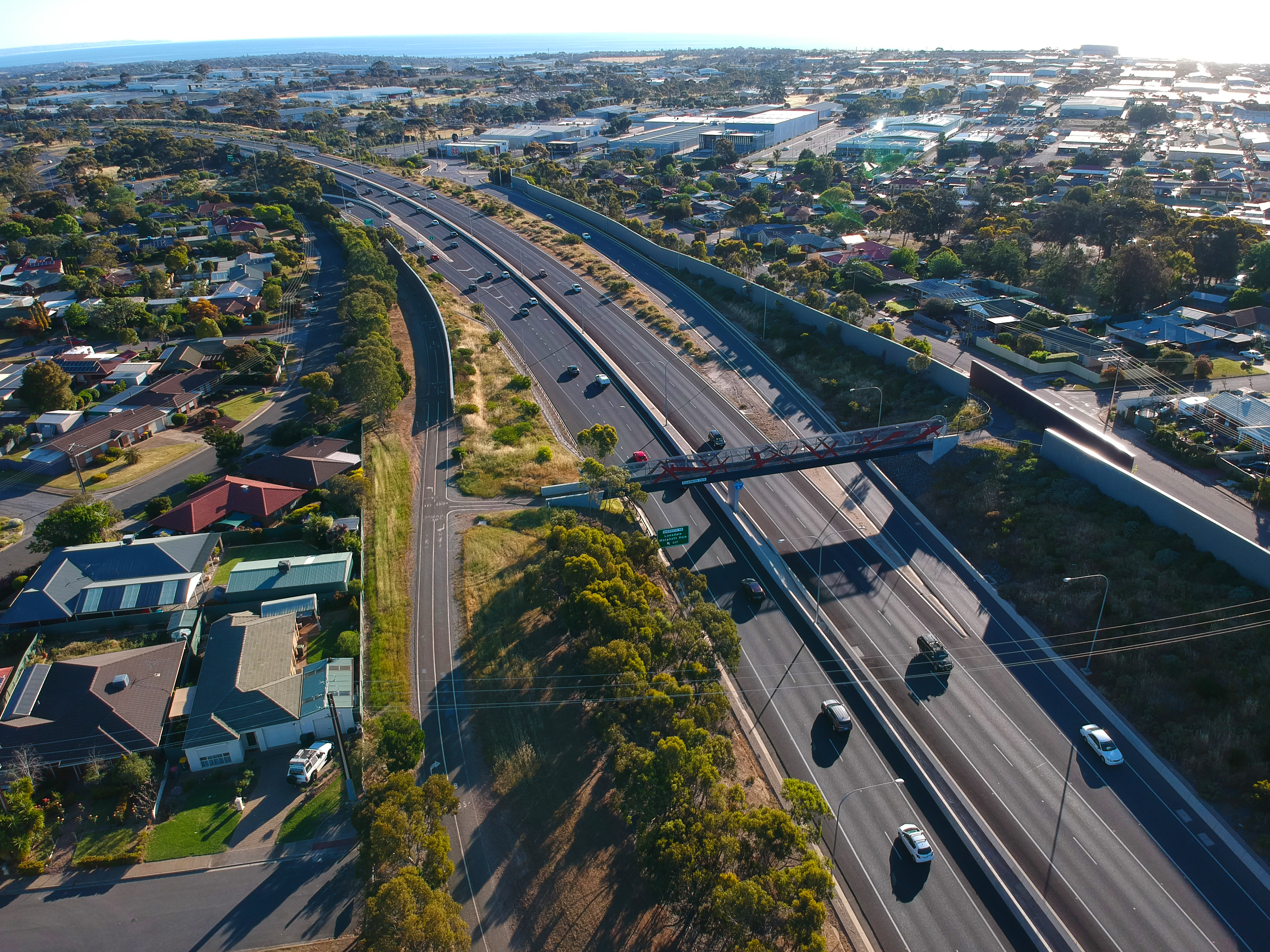
Morphett Vale to left of photo

Rhianna Ann Barreau (born 1979 or 1980) was a 12-year-old Australian girl who went missing in October 1992 from her home in Morphett Vale, South Australia. She was suspected to have been abducted and murdered. The South Australia Police has described the case as one of the "largest files" with major crime in modern times but have never officially named any suspect.

== Disappearance ==
1 12:05-12:30 Morphett Vale High school (now Morphett Vale primary school) where Rhianna was sighted
2 12:30 Highwray Drive where Rhianna was sighted
3 Wakefield Avenue, Rhiannas home where her belongings were found

On the morning of Wednesday, 7 October 1992, Rhianna and her mother planned to meet for lunch at the nearby Colonnades Shopping Centre, near her mother's workplace. Rhianna wanted to purchase a card for her overseas pen pal, but the public transport workers called a snap bus strike, thereby affecting her commute. After Rhianna's mother Paula left from home to work at 8.30am, Rhianna is thought to have remained at home until she was spotted walking to the Southgate Square Shopping Centre at 10.30am, and purchased a Christmas card at 11:19am for her pen-pal.

Between 12:05 pm and 12:30 pm, Rhianna was sighted crossing the Morphett Vale High School and Stanvac Primary School grounds with a small bag, presumably the Christmas card she had purchased earlier. At 12:30 pm, she was spotted again walking along the Highway Drive. It was believed that Rhianna returned home because the bag was on the dining table, but the arrival time was unclear. Paula Barreau returned home at approximately 4:10 pm, and after entering the locked door, saw the television on, and a vinyl record on the floor of the living room. The un-opened small bag of Christmas card was on the dining table.

== Police reactions ==
The case was declared a major crime two days after she went missing. Retired detective Allen Arthur of the South Australia Police said that the lack of the community's assistance will flounder the case, as well as referenced that it might become another unsolved disappearance of the Beaumont children, and the Adelaide Oval abduction.

By 25 November 1992, there were over 1600 calls to police. In the same month, a man called police from a payphone, reporting that he had found keys on a footpath on Highway Drive. However, when the man returned to the location the keys were gone. The man who called police said he saw a young girl matching Rhianna's description near a White Torana on the day she went missing.

== Unconfirmed link to interstate predator dubbed 'Mr Cruel' ==
Police received information from a witness that saw a White LH Torana Sedan, with a black spoiler either at the rear or at the front, parked at the carpark of the Stanvac Kindergarten on the day she went missing. The Torana supposedly had Victorian numberplates, but this was never confirmed nor was the car found by police. The potential link to Victoria sparked rumours that Rhianna fell victim to Mr Cruel, who also targeted young girls on school holidays.
