= Bessie Davidson =

Australian artist (1879–1965)

- Born: Bessie Ellen Davidson; 22 May 1879; Adelaide, South Australia, Australia
- Died: 22 February 1965 (aged 85); Montparnasse, Paris, France
- Resting place: Saint-Saëns, Seine-Maritime, France
- Education: Künstlerinner Verein; Académie de la Grande Chaumière
- Known for: Painting
- Movement: Impressionism
- Elected: Société Nationale des Beaux-Arts (1922)

Bessie Ellen Davidson (22 May 1879 – 22 February 1965) was an Australian painter known for her impressionist, light-filled landscapes and interiors.

== Early life and education ==
Bessie Ellen Davidson was born on 22 May 1879 in North Adelaide, South Australia, to a family of Scottish and English origin. She was the second child of David Davidson, who was in the mining industry, and Ellen Johnson Davidson. Her great-grandfather William Gowan was a sculptor, and her grandmother Frances Gowan was a painter. She was educated at the Advanced School for Girls (which had a strong drawing strand), and studied art with the painter Rose McPherson (better known as Margaret Preston). She began exhibiting with the South Australian Society of Arts as early as 1901; in this period, her work clearly showed Preston's influence.

In 1904, after her mother's death, she went to Europe to study art in company with Preston. They spent the first few months in Munich, where Davidson studied briefly at the Künstlerinner Verein, before moving on to Paris. There she studied at the Académie de la Grande Chaumière, under René-Xavier Prinet, where she met and began a lifelong friendship with Philippe Besnard's future wife, Germaine Desgranges. She also took classes with Raphael Collin, Richard Miller, and Gustave Courtois. A year after her arrival in France, she was exhibiting at the Salon de la Société des Artistes Français, and the year after that at the Société Nationale des Beaux-Arts. In 1922 she would become the first Australian woman elected a member of the Société Nationale des Beaux-Arts, and she would later serve as its secretary. She was a founding member of the Salon des Tuileries, at which she would exhibit almost every year between 1923 and 1951.

== Career ==
Returning to Australia in 1907, Davidson rented a studio with Preston and continued painting and exhibiting for several years. In 1908, the National Gallery of South Australia bought her portrait of the potter Gladys Reynell. In 1910, she went back to Paris and set up a workshop in Monparnasse on Boissonade Street next door to Raymond Legueult and across the street from the Dutch painter Conrad Kickert. She became the godmother of Kickert's daughter as well as of Philippe Besnard's daughter. She made many other friends in Parisian art circles, including the painter Anders Osterlind.

Davidson travelled to Australia to visit family in 1914 and was there when World War I began. She returned to France immediately, where she joined the French Red Cross and served in various military hospitals. During the war, she met the woman who would be her companion for the next two decades, Marguerite Leroy (d. 1938), whose nickname was "Dauphine".

The postwar period between 1918 and 1920 saw Davidson producing quiet, intimate, loosely impressionistic paintings—mostly interiors, still lives, and portraits—in muted tones. Her style evolved in a more vigorous direction in the 1920s and 1930s, with rich, vibrant, often dramatic colours laid on with a palette knife. In this period her work sold well and was well received by critics. She travelled around Europe, Russia, and Morocco making outdoor sketches that she used as the basis for paintings later produced in her studio. Her landscapes are notable for their quality of light and sense of atmosphere.

In 1930 Davidson was a founding vice-president of La Société Femmes Artistes Modernes. She was a founding member of the Société Nationale Indépendantes and a member of the Salon d'Automne. In 1931 she was appointed to the French Legion of Honor, in part for her cofounding of the Salon des Tuileries, the only Australian woman to receive that honour up to that time. She exhibited widely with such artists as Mary Cassatt, Tamara de Lempicka, Camille Claudel, and Suzanne Valadon.

Although still a citizen of the British Commonwealth, Davidson decided to stay in France during World War II. She lived with friends in Grenoble, and some sources say that she was a member of the French Resistance. Her paintings from this period are strong, bright, and lively. In 1945, she returned to her old studio in Paris, occasionally spending time at a farm she bought near Rouen. In the postwar period, she painted mostly outdoors on small wood panels.

She died at Montparnasse in France in 1965. She was buried in Saint-Saëns, Seine-Maritime.
