= Gladys Reynell =

Australian artist (1881–1956)

- Gladys Reynell in a rowboat, n.d.
- Born: 4 September 1881; Glenelg, South Australia
- Died: 16 November 1956 (aged 75); Melbourne, Australia
- Education: Camberwell School of Arts and Crafts, London
- Style: Modernism; Arts and Crafts influence
- Spouse: George Samuel Osborne

Gladys Reynell (1881–1956) was one of South Australia's earliest potters and is known for her bold modernist style and her preference for working with native clays.

== Family and education ==
Reynell was born on 4 September 1881 in Glenelg, a suburb of Adelaide, Australia. She was the third of the five children of well-to-do land agent and wine-grape grower Walter Reynell and his wife Emily (née Bakewell). She was the granddaughter of John Reynell, who is thought to have established the first commercial winery in South Australia, and the cousin of suffragist Elizabeth Webb Nicholls. Walter Reynell had inherited his father's large estate, and it was there that Gladys grew up and was home-schooled, before matriculating at Tormore House School in North Adelaide.

Gladys Reynell initially studied medicine at the University of Adelaide but left to study art. By 1903, she had joined the School of Design's Art Club in Adelaide and that same year she exhibited work at the South Australian Society of Arts' annual show. In 1907, the painters Margaret Preston and Bessie Davidson established their own studio where they offered classes, and Reynell began studying painting there with Preston, who was to become a close friend.

In 1912, Reynell and Preston traveled to Paris, where they stayed for a year before moving on to London and Ireland. Their plans were derailed by the outbreak of World War I and by the death of Reynell's younger brother Carew at Gallipoli in 1915. The following year, at the instigation of her surviving brother Rupert, Reynell (and Preston) began to learn pottery at the Camberwell School of Arts and Crafts in London, with the goal of teaching it to disabled soldiers. The earliest surviving pieces of Reynell's pottery date from this period, and she had already begun to manifest an interest in using clay from her native land by having a sample of clay from Kangaroo Island sent to her in London.

In 1918, towards the end of the war, Reynell and Preston began teaching pottery to soldiers at the Seale Hayne Neurological Hospital in Devon, where Rupert was a surgeon. The following year Reynell returned home when her father fell ill. He died on 8 April 1919 in Reynella, a town in South Australia that his father had established.

== Career and personal life ==
In September 1919, Reynell and Preston shared an exhibition of paintings and pottery at Preece's Gallery in Adelaide, which was just becoming established as a center of the city's cultural life. In his opening address, the governor of South Australia expressed the then-common view that he did not understand the modern style of art, while agreeing that "the work now exhibited is certainly the work of great artists."

Following this show, Reynell established her own pottery studio at Reynella. She thus became one of Australia's earliest studio potters and the first person in South Australia to take part in all stages of the production of ceramics from finding clay deposits and building her own kiln all the way through the throwing, glazing, and firing stages. (Australian aboriginal artists did not develop their own pottery tradition, so it was European settlers like Reynell who brought the art of pottery to the continent.) She remarked on her excitement over using clays native to Australia "that had never before known potter's hands."

Reynell's pottery consisted mainly of earthenware bowls, cups, and other kitchenware decorated with designs of Australian animals and flowers. Her pottery forms were based on European folk art models, while the decorations were created using traditional slipware and sgraffito techniques. Many of her early works were made of McLaren Vale clay with a reddish-brown slip; later she became known for a deep cobalt blue body colour (over a paler clay body). The bold, linear decorations that were her hallmark were inspired by a number of sources: by the Arts and Crafts movement, by Aboriginal art, and by the abstract modernism championed by the English artist Roger Fry. All of her pieces were unique; she never showed any interest in developing commercial lines of ceramic work.

Running Reynella Pottery single-handed proved difficult, and sometime after 1920, Reynell hired George Samuel Osborne, an ex-serviceman and gardener, as her assistant. They developed a close relationship and eventually decided to marry. Since Osborne's family had worked as servants for the Reynells (and possibly also because Osborne was ten years Reynell's junior), her rather snobbish family disapproved of the match. Nonetheless, Reynell and Osborne were married at St Mary's Church, Edwardstown, in 1922 and then moved to Ballarat in Victoria state, where they started Osrey Pottery. The firm's name was an amalgam of their surnames. Their products were very popular and were sold in Melbourne through the Primrose Pottery Shop and also at street fairs, where Reynell would sometimes draw attention by throwing pottery on the spot. They were forced to close the pottery business in 1926 after Osborne contracted lead poisoning from the lead in the glazes, and this catastrophe drove them into poverty.

In the 1930s Reynell returned briefly to painting and printmaking, sometimes exhibiting under her married name. Osborne recovered his health enough to join the army during World War II, and the couple moved to Melbourne, where Reynell supported the war effort through jobs with the army pay corps and as a translator of French. Reynell died of cancer on 16 November 1956; her husband scattered her ashes at Reynella.

Reynell's reputation was slow to take off, in part because she worked to a great extent isolated from the larger Australian art community (first at Reynella, later at Ballarat). In addition, because she was pioneering the field of ceramics in Australia, she lacked both a community of peers and an educated audience. Her work only began to be collected systematically in the late 1960s, and her pottery and other works (including paintings, linocuts, and sketchbooks) are now in major Australian collections, including the National Gallery of Australia, the Art Gallery of New South Wales, and the Powerhouse Museum in Sydney. The South Australian Art Gallery holds a portrait of Reynell in her mid-twenties painted by her friend Bessie Davidson.

== Publications ==
- "Knowledge or Feeling in Art." Art in Australia, 15 August 1935.
- "Reynella Pottery." In Louise Brown (ed.), A Book of South Australia. Adelaide: 1936.
