= Old Reynella, South Australia =

Old Reynella
- Suburb
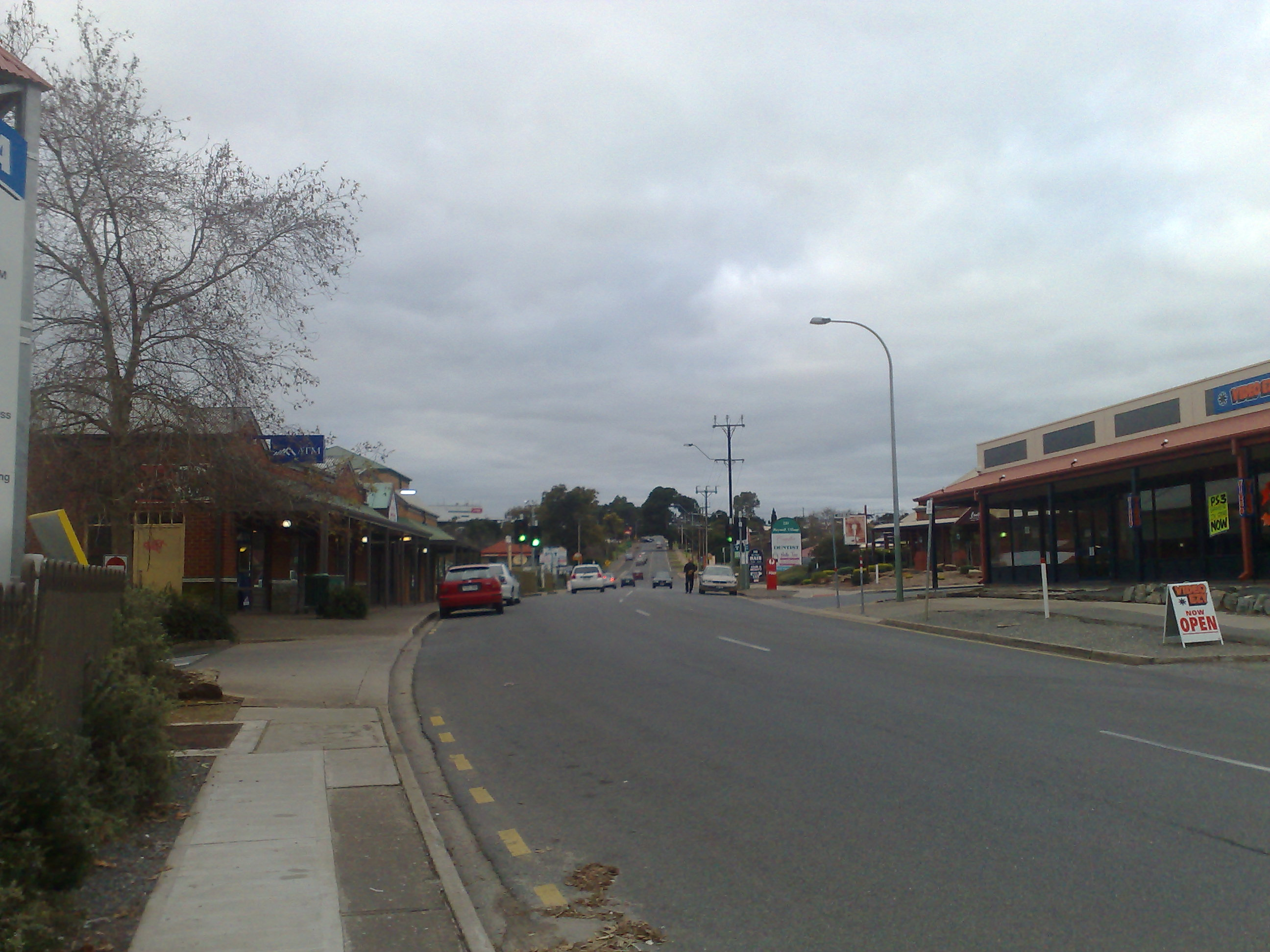
- Old South Road, Old Reynella, facing north

- Coordinates: 35°05′43″S 138°32′28″E
- Country: Australia
- State: South Australia
- Region: Southern Adelaide
- City: Adelaide
- LGA: City of Onkaparinga
- Established: 1840

Government
  - State electorate: Hurtle Vale
  - Federal division: Kingston

Population
  - Total: 3,458 (SAL 2021)
- Postcode: 5161
- County: Adelaide
Suburbs around Old Reynella
Trott Park	O'Halloran Hill	Happy Valley
Reynella	Old Reynella	Reynella East
Morphett Vale	Morphett Vale	Woodcroft

Old Reynella is a metropolitan suburb of Adelaide, South Australia. It is located 20 km south of the Adelaide city centre in the north of the City of Onkaparinga.

The suburb is named after John Reynell, a pioneering South Australian winemaker. Reynell sold some farmland to create the town of Reynella which is the present location of the suburb Old Reynella. The Reynell name goes back to the very beginning of the wine industry in South Australia, when John Reynell planted some of the first vines in the infant colony in the area that was later to bear his name. This pioneer of the grape was born in 1809 of a Devonshire farming family. Shortly after his arrival in 1838 John Reynell established his property, situated 20 kilometres south of Adelaide and 5 kilometres east of Gulf St Vincent – the gateway to the McLaren Vale wine region.

The Reynella Winery is claimed to be the only winery in Australia that can use the name of a town as its registered brand because the winery was in existence before the town was established.

The Old Reynella area is the historical centre of the district and the original home of Reynella Primary School, before it was moved to its current site in Carew Fields in 1990. Old Reynella is also the historical home of the Hardy Wine Company.

Edge Church is located in Old Reynella at the former site of the Reynella Markets (closed down in 1995).

== History ==
=== Hurtle Vale ===
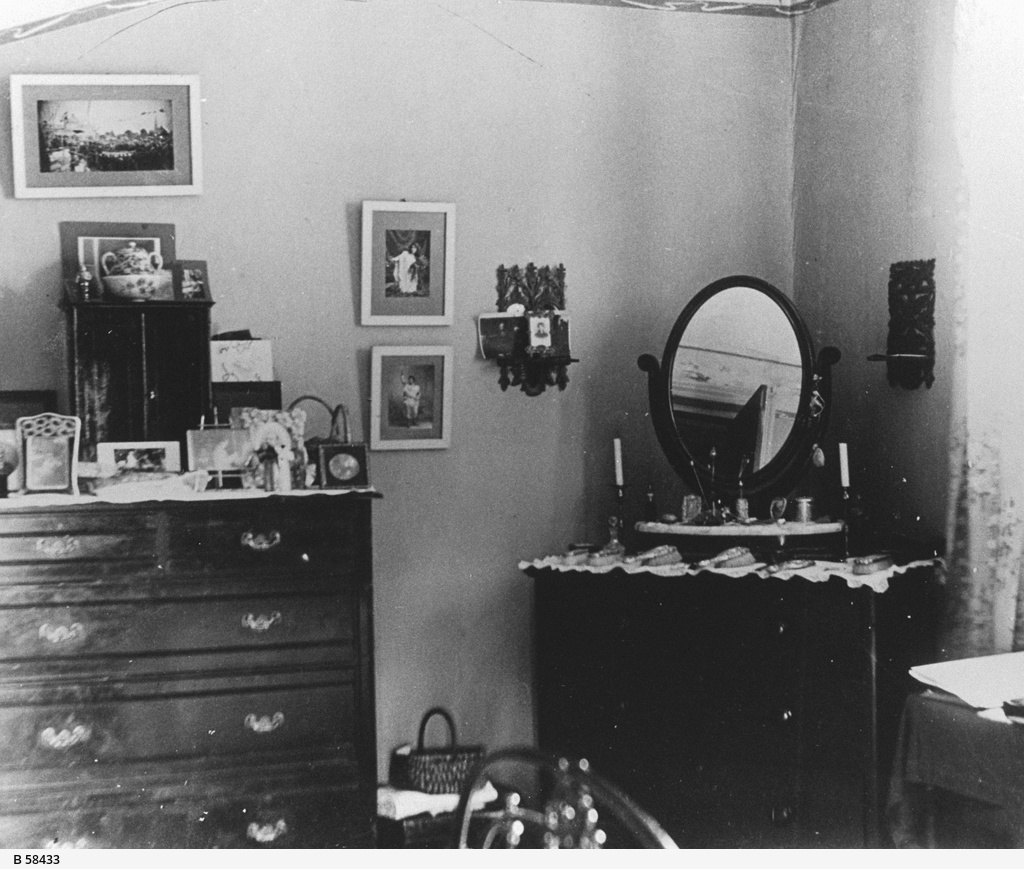
Photograph of Rupert Reynell's room

With the arrival of Governor Hindmarsh on HMS Buffalo on 28 December 1836, the new private colony of South Australia was proclaimed. The state government was established through the formation of a private company in England known as the South Australia Company. Its Surveyor-General, Colonel William Light, was charged with the surveying of the land into 80-acre (32 ha) allotments ready for sale to the new settlers to South Australia. One of his team was John McLaren, who was responsible for surveying Sections B, C and D to the south of Adelaide. This task was completed in 1839 and the first survey maps were printed in 1840.

On 16 June 1837, the Colonial Commissioner Sir James Hurtle Fisher, John Morphett, Colonel William Light, and a party of marines set off from Glenelg intending to travel overland to Encounter Bay to visit whalers who were employees of the South Australian Company. Colonel Light's diary records: "At 4.00pm the party arrived at a beautiful valley, where they encamped for the night, the country and soil together adapted for grazing or agriculture; the whole distance was not more than ten or eleven miles (18 km) from Glenelg." This area was named Hurtle Vale after the Colonial Commissioner.

A later survey map drawn by John Mclaren in 1857 shows the area covered some 107 x 80-acre (32 ha) allotments, stretching from the hills in the east towards the coast in the west with the Field River running through the centre of the valley.

The name Hurtle Vale was never officially registered as a geographical name although widely used in the community for some time. Today the suburbs of Happy Valley, O'Halloran Hill, Trott Park, Sheidow Park, Reynella and parts of Hallett Cove, Morphett Vale and Woodcroft can be found within the old definition of Hurtle Vale.

=== Town establishment ===
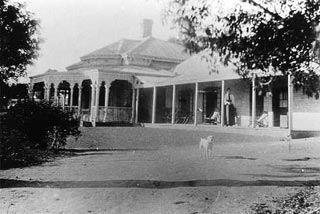
Reynell homestead, 1896

On 12 March 1839, Section 524 was granted to Thomas Lucas who immediately rented it to John Reynell until the Indenture for Sale was drawn up on 26 August 1839, when John agreed to pay Thomas and Catherine Lucas £80 for the 80-acre (32 ha) section.

In 1839, John Reynell claimed he was the first settler to enclose an entire 80-acre (32 ha) section. A little later he had to cut the fences to allow for the alignment of a proposed road for the passage of a regular mail run to Encounter Bay which was established by the end of 1839.

=== Vineyards ===
In 1841, Reynell began the planting of his vineyard with cuttings from Van Diemen's Land, which was recorded as South Australia's first commercial vineyard.

=== Subdivision and notice of sale ===
By 1854 there was a demand for land for housing in the area and in February of that year, John Reynell drew up a Notice of Sale for a portion of his Reynella Farm for the establishment of the township of Reynella.

Selections of paragraphs from that notice are as follows:

"Sale by Auction of the Township of Reynella, to be sold on the land of Wednesday, 12 April 1854 by order and for account of John Reynella Esq. We have received instructions to submit to public competition this promising Township....."

"The township consists of about 40 acres (16 ha) of land divided into allotments varying from one quarter to two acres with the Great South Road dividing it equally from North to South..."

"A fine steam mill of four storeys is already erected in the town ship and a handsome hotel is in rapid progress and will be open by winter."

"The auction will be held at the mill, and in the grounds luncheon will be prepared where required facilities will be afforded in the way of payment."

"Further conditions at time of sale. Title indisputable. Plans may be seen at Hay's Tapley's Hill, The Emu, [these are early hotels in the district] and also at the Blacksmith's shop on the ground."

By 1866 the town had the steam flour mill, hotel, post office, store, school and chapel. However, by the end of the Nineteenth Century as many farmers had moved to the northern agricultural lands, Reynella was said to be "a village of the past, as several ruined houses along the road remain to testify."

=== Twentieth century ===
The town flourished around the farming and wine making that had been pioneered and by the mid twentieth century tourism had begun to join wine, fruit production and farming to underpin the local economy.

Around 1920, the artist Gladys Reynell—granddaughter of John Reynell—established her own pottery studio at Reynella. She thus became one of Australia's earliest studio potters. She ran the pottery at first single-handedly but sometime in the 1920s hired George Samuel Osborne, an ex-serviceman and gardener, as her assistant. They developed a close relationship and eventually married, moving their pottery operation away from Reynella to Ballarat in Victoria state.

South Road was bypassed in the later half of the century and since 1960 the spread of suburbs south from Adelaide has transformed much of the agricultural land into housing.

Vineyards can still be seen in the surrounds of Accolade Wines, originally the Reynell Winery, later known as Hardy's Winery in Old Reynella.

=== Historical sites ===
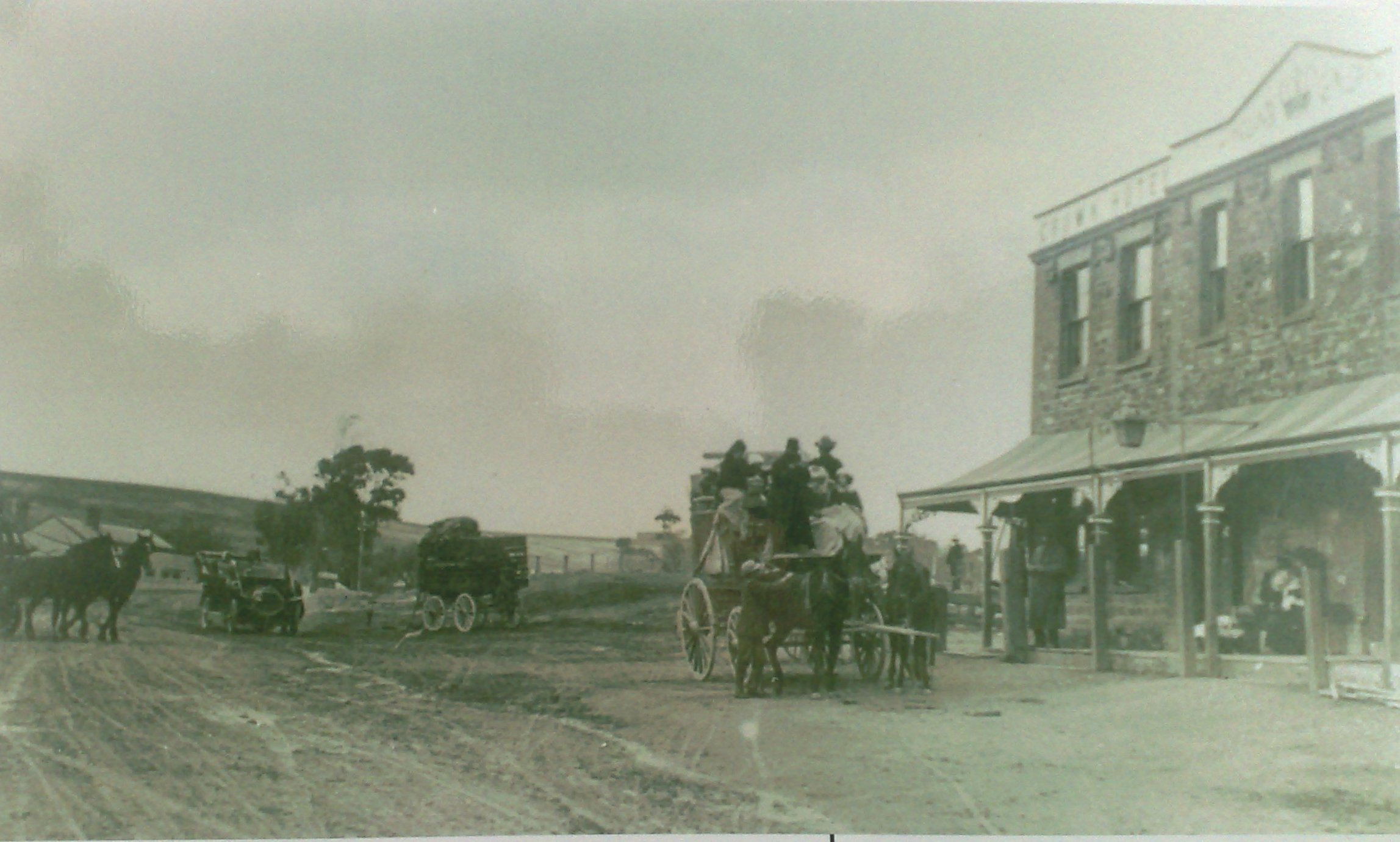
Crown Inn Hotel, South Road, Old Reynella circa 1910

==== Crown Inn Hotel ====
In 1853, twelve months before the town land sales took place, John Reynell sold 1-acre (4,000 m^{2}) of land on the north side of Panalatinga Creek on what was known as the Great South Road, to a Mr Robert Hay for the purpose of building a hotel.

The hotel, now known as the Crown Inn Hotel, has had a continual licence since that time. Over the years it has had several variations of the original name. In 1855 it was known as the Crown Inn, then in 1856 it became the Crown Hotel, in 1886 the Reynella Hotel, and in 1887 the Crown Inn.

==== Cellar No.1 ====
As part of John Reynell's expanding interest in winemaking, Cellar No. 1, known as the Old Cave, was developed. This is Australia's oldest working cellar and is registered with the National Trust. In 1845, the cellar was dug by hand into limestone subsoil with nothing but a shovel. The walls were made of local blue gum beams and sugar gum saplings and the roof of tree trunks from the nearby scrub covered with a thick layer of straw and clay. Although now covered by manicured lawn, the cellar is still in practical use.

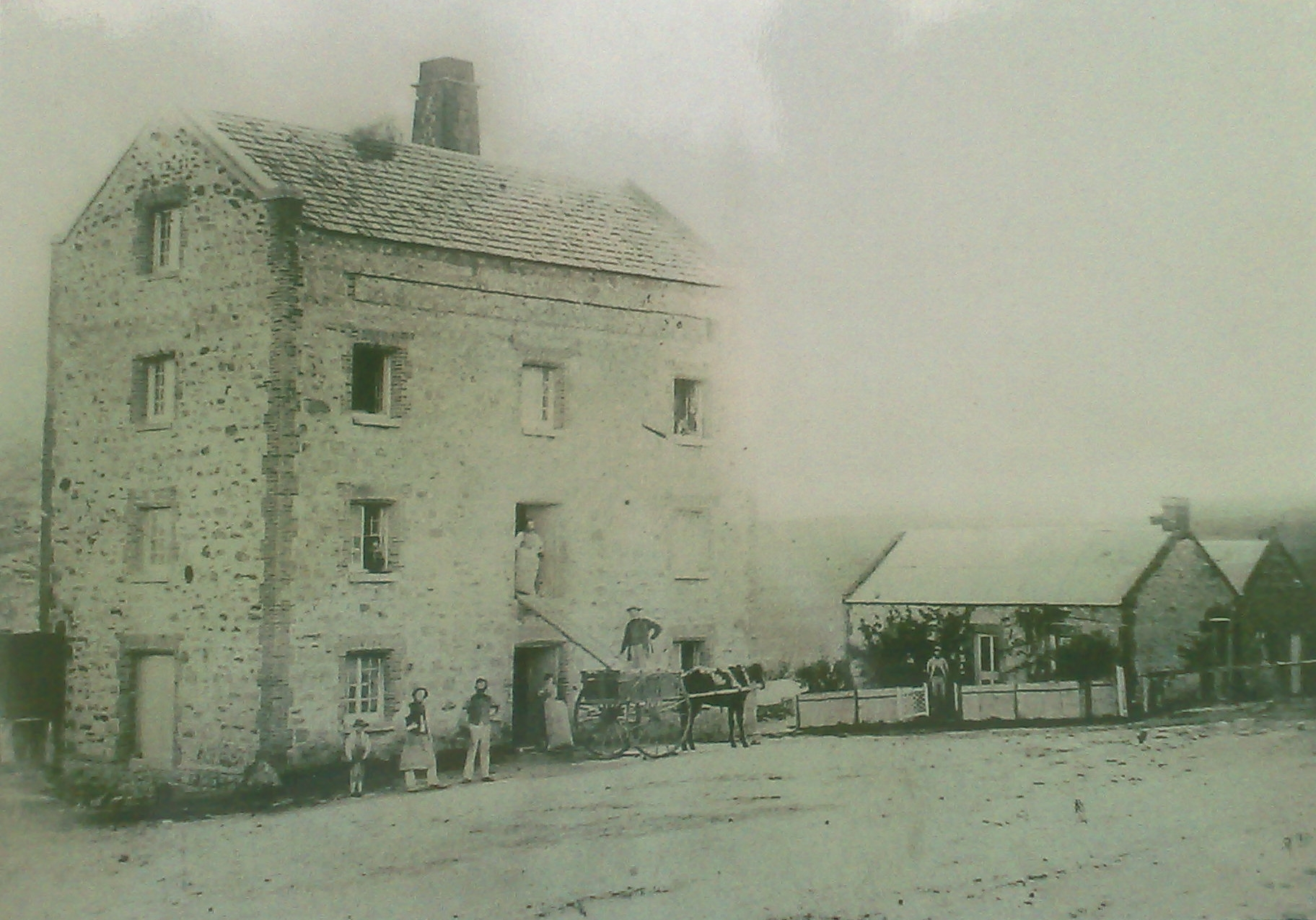
Reynella Grist Mill

==== Southern Grist Mill ====
The abundance of grain in the area saw the building of a four-storey steam-driven flourmill, known as the Southern Grist Mill.

Although the exact date it was erected is not known, records show that it was operation prior to the sale of land for the hotel on 22 August 1853. In the early days of the colony, the registration of the use of land often took some time. It is recorded that on 15 August 1853, the mill property, lot number 81 on the town plan, was sold to a consortium of gentlemen and farmers of the district, namely Robert Montgomery, Charles Smith, John Reynell, Henry Douglas, William Sherriff, Ignatius Sullivan and James Bain, operating as the Southern Grist Mill Company.

On 10 January 1855, the mill was sold to George Pool, a miller.

In the late 1850s, John Cain, became the mill manager for George Pool. On 15 August 1857, John Cain was killed in a horrific accident at the mill, being dragged into the machinery.

George Pool operated the mill until his death on 18 June 1864. The mill operations then passed to his wife. Sometime circa 1865 the mill was destroyed by fire – according to local mythology, under mysterious circumstances.

The mill was located where the current shopping mall now stands, approximately opposite Mill Street.

==== Changing Station ====
Situated on the northern side of the flourmill, these buildings were originally used as a blacksmith that operated before the hotel was built in 1853. Evidence would suggest that the first documented Certificate of Title found is for Robert Eglinton, Reynella Blacksmith, dated 17 January 1867.

These buildings included stables, livery and ostlers rooms and later a cottage.

It was also natural for such businesses to be the place where travellers, going to and from Adelaide, changed horses. And so it developed into a changing station for the Cobb & Co coaches that operated between Adelaide and Willunga. An addition to the front of the cottage acted as a ticket office for this service. Operation as a changing station ceased in February 1915 with the introduction of train services from Willunga to Adelaide.

==== Old Distillery, now St Francis Winery ====
Carew Reynell, son of Walter Reynell, had a great interest in the study of viticulture and by the age of 19 his father gave him most of the responsibility for managing the winery. He greatly expanded and developed the business, building a distillery, enhancing the firm's reputation for brandy making. Reynella Brandy became Australia's leading brandy.

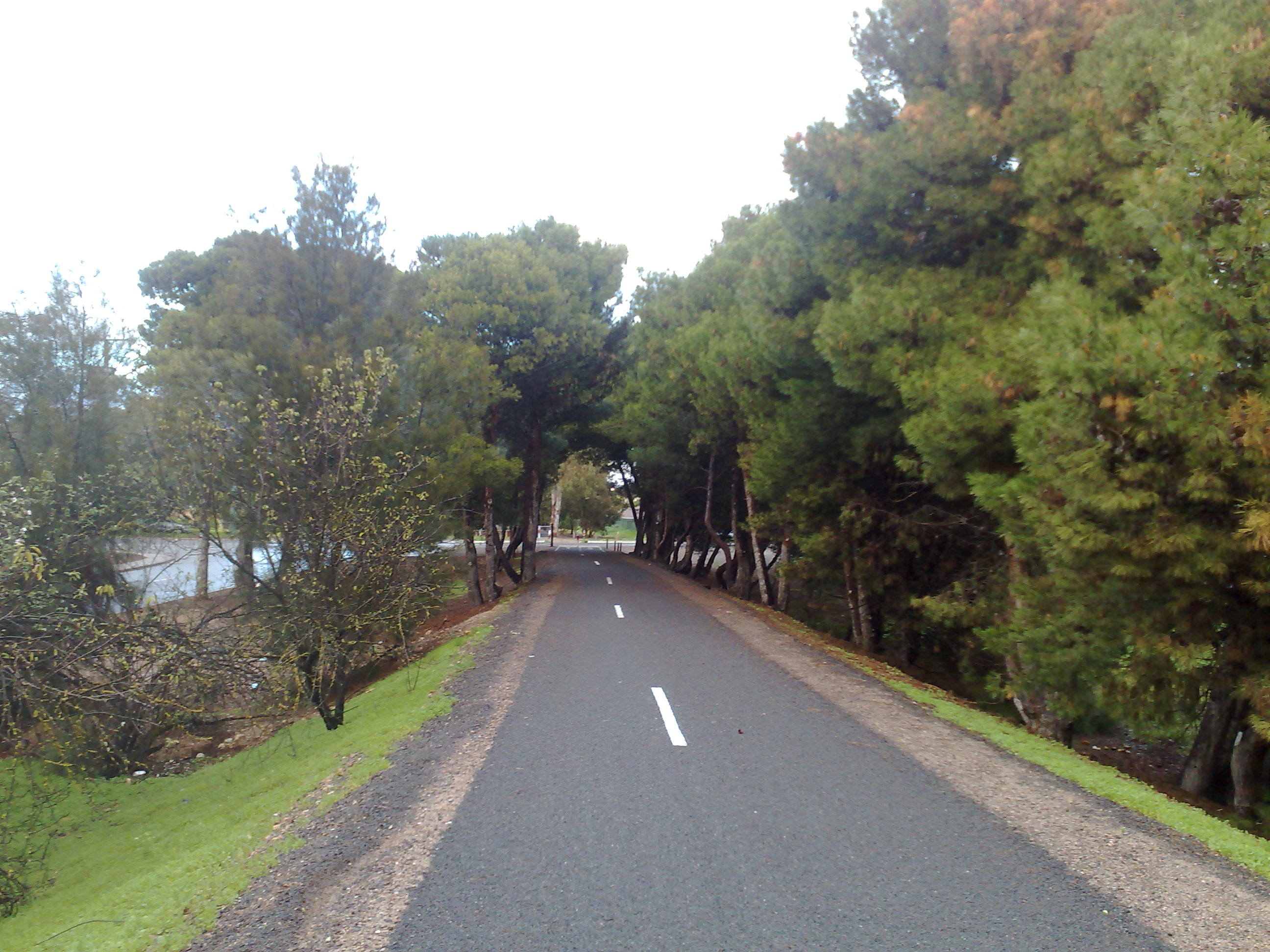
Section of the Coast to Vines rail trail in Old Reynella, facing south

=== Railway services ===
The official opening of the Adelaide – Willunga railway was on Wednesday 20 January 1915, although there would have been construction and work trains operating on the line well before this date. Both freight and passenger trains operated on the line. The last passenger service ran on 19 May 1957. A goods train ran twice a week until 1963 and, following falling demand, the rail service finally closed in May 1969.

The dismantling of the line commenced in May 1972. Some 43,000 sleepers were removed between Willunga and Hallett Cove. The high embankment that carried the line over the Panalatinga Creek was also removed during this time.

== Transport information ==
Old Reynella is primary serviced by buses on the Adelaide Metro network. It is home to the Old Reynella Bus Interchange with connections to the Noarlunga Centre, the city and Westfield Marion.

It is serviced primarily by South Road, Panalatinga Road and the Panalatinga Road exit of the Southern Expressway.

The Coast to Vines rail trail passes through Old Reynella.

== Sport ==
The Reynella Community Centre is located on Oval Road, and is home to local sporting clubs such as the Reynella Football Club (Australian rules football), as well as the Reynella cricket, tennis, air rifle, lawn bowls, and dart clubs, among others. The Reynella Neighbourhood Centre is on Old South Road and is a hub for many activities for the youngest to the oldest members of the community. It is run by the City of Onkaparinga.

== Schools ==
- Reynella Primary School
- Reynella Community Children's Centre
