= Edge Church =

Multi-campus non-denomination church based in Adelaide, South Australia

Edge Church, registered as Edge Church International, formerly Southside Christian Church, is a multi-campus non-denomination church established in 1994. It is based in Adelaide, South Australia.

== Establishment ==
Edge Church International was originally called Southside Christian Church when it was established in 1994. Ps Danny Guglielmucci established Southside Christian Church in May of that year, with just 80 people in a small building at O'Halloran Hill.

By 1996, Southside had relocated from O'Halloran Hill to their current Adelaide South campus in Old Reynella in the Adelaide southern suburbs. The church relocated to what had previously been the Old Reynella Markets in Old Reynella.

In 2006, Southside Christian Church was renamed to become Edge Church International, reflecting a broader reach outside of just the South of Adelaide.

In 2014, Edge Church saw a major transition in leadership from Ps Danny Guglielmucci as the founding pastor, to senior pastor Jonathan Fontanarosa who guided the church for nine years through until 2023.

In 2023, Ps Danny Guglielmucci was "requested by the church leadership to assist with governance and growth difficulties". A change of leadership was endorsed by the board and staff later that year, who requested that Ps Danny Gugielmucci be retained on a part-time basis to oversee the transition to new leadership.

In 2024, Edge Church, with the endorsement of Ps Danny Gugielmucci, staff and board, agreed to become associated with Equippers Churchunder the leadership of Ps Sam Monk.

== Church growth ==
In 2001 a second campus based in the central area of Adelaide was established. Initially meeting at the Wonderland Ballroom in Hawthorn, the Southside City campus was forced to move seven times in two years as it experienced rapid growth. Ultimately, the Edge Church City campus was located in the Hindley Street cinema complex, in the Adelaide CBD before amalgamating with the West Campus in 2015.

Westside Assembly of God at Findon became the Edge Church West campus in 2006. Edge Church then expanded internationally, with the Edge Church Bristol campus being established in 2008, based out of Aztec West, in Bristol, England. The Edge Church Melbourne campus was then established in 2010, in the suburb of Burwood in Melbourne, to leave Edge Church currently with four campuses.

== Mission work ==
Edge Church has been involved in mission work, both locally and abroad. For many years, the church was involved in community projects around Adelaide, including renovations of Morphett Vale High School, the Adelaide Women's and Children's Hospital accommodation and out-patient wards, the Childhood Cancer Association accommodation units and their head office, and the Adelaide Women's Prison Living Skills Unit.

Edge Church has hosted an annual "RED" (rescue, empower, deploy) event, where the church raises money for different community partners.

== See also ==
- Youth Alive
