= Panalatinga Road =

Road in Adelaide, Australia

Panalatinga Road South Australia
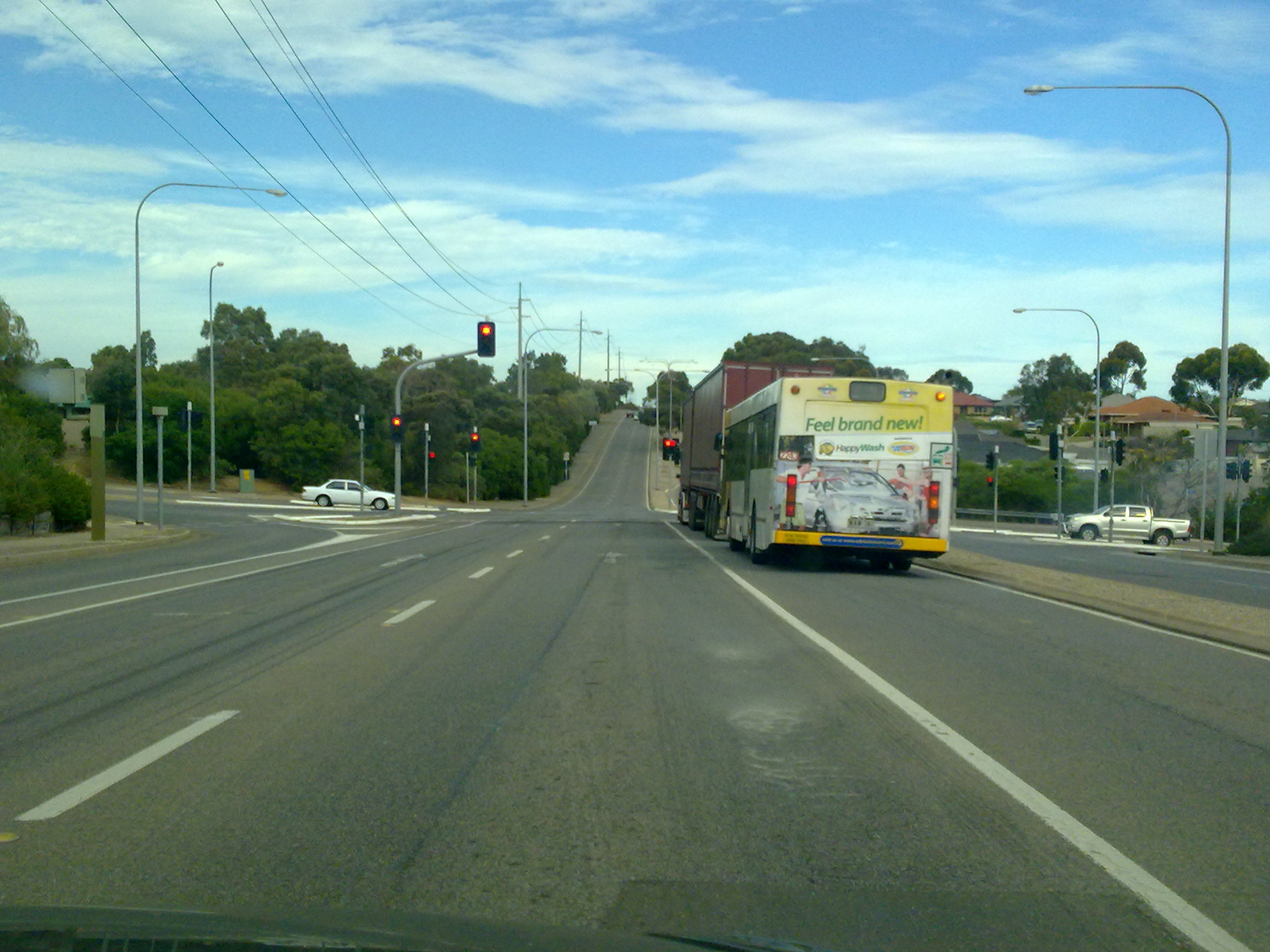
- Panalatinga Road, looking south at the intersection with Pimpala Road
- Coordinates: 35.081325°S 138.546381°E (North end); 35.130022°S 138.549570°E (South end)

General information
- Type: Road
- Location: Adelaide
- Length: 5.6 km (3.5 mi)

Major junctions
- North end: Southern Expressway; Reynella East, Adelaide
- Main South Road
- South end: Cox Hill Road; Onkaparinga Hills, Adelaide

Location(s)
- Region: Southern Adelaide
- Major suburbs: Old Reynella, Woodcroft, Morphett Vale

Panalatinga Road is a north-south minor arterial road in the southern suburbs of Adelaide. The Panalatinga Creek runs under the road in the northern section, which gives this road its name. It is derived from the Kaurna name Pandlotinga, with the 'inga' suffix meaning 'path of water' which is often mispronounced as Panatalinga.

== Route ==
Panalatinga Road commences at the junction of Main South Road and the Southern Expressway in Reynella, and heads south past Wheatsheaf Road where it terminates soon after, continuing uphill as Coxs Hill Road into the Onkaparinga Hills. The original road reserve for the extension of Panalatinga Road (in the 1950s and 1960s then known simply as “Government Road”) carries on southwards as a “No Through Road” named St Vincent’s View terminating at several private gateways to adjacent acreage properties. The road reserve then continues across a creek gully (the name of the creek is not known at this point: it may be Emu Creek since there is a road named Emu Creek Lane in the vicinity) to emerge on the other side of the gully as Kimbley Road at the junction of Spriggs Road. At least until the early 1960s it was possible to traverse this road reserve and cross the creek - by foot or by horseback but not by a vehicle - thus allowing travel along the full length of Panalatinga Road including its southern road reserve extension from Reynella in the north to Upper Penney’s Hill Road in the south at Hackam. The route was enhanced by partial clearing when a rough service vehicle track was created in the mid-1950s to assist with the laying out of high voltage power poles and lines, which now follow this road reserve for its full length.

The current Panalatinga Road is a four lane dual carriageway for the 4.6 km length north of Wheatsheaf Road, and a two lane single carriageway for the 1 km to the south. The entire road has a speed limit of 80 km/h, and is used as an alternative to South Road and local road States Road. The majority of southbound traffic exits at Wheatsheaf Road, where the road reduces to a single lane, and the right southbound and left northbound lane are made for access to/from Wheatsheaf Road.

== History ==
Panalatinga Road was once a rural-style road, being a well maintained gravel or dirt road passing vineyards on both sides of the section north of Reynell Road, a mix of vineyards and almond orchards between Reynell Road and Pimpala Road, and dairying and general farming with several almond orchards between Pimpala and Coxs Hill Roads. By the mid-1950s the road had been bituminised from Kenihans Road to just past its intersection with Reynell Road at the end of a hedge-like row of cypress pine trees which grew along the roadside boundary of the old Reynell homestead just south of the intersection (the road was bituminised to this point doubtless due to the Reynell family’s influence on the local government road board or council of the day). South of that point the road remained a gravel road at least until the early 1960s and was later bituminised as a two lane road but with no median strip or kerbs. Not until much later when the road was upgraded with kerbing were traffic lights installed, the first apparently being at the junction with the Main South Road at the north, but not at Kenihans Road. The Southern Expressway did not exist at the time. These intersections, as with all intersections along the length of the road, were obviously much simpler than in the current day.

In the early days the gravel road was in many respects a more interesting road as it followed the natural undulations of the topography, whereas the modern day road has smoothed out these undulations. South of the intersection with Pimpala Road was a relatively steep incline alongside what is now the Banks Road open space or playground. The road maintained its elevation until after the intersection with Bains Road where it descended gradually to a winter creek crossing about one third of the way along to Wheatsheaf Road. This creek crossing was a renowned patch for getting vehicles bogged as the clay soil became very sticky when wet and required careful negotiation. The crossing was characterised by quite tall clumps of wild fennel bushes and the road narrowed down to a single track as it curved around the clumps at the lowest point. From there the road widened again and ascended to another high point before falling away to a cement culvert creek crossing for the winter creek that runs alongside the northern boundary of what is now the Thaxted Park Golf Club (then a dairy farm named “Thaxted Park“ by the owners in the 1950s and early 1960s following a belief that a previous owner had called the property ”Thaxted”, possibly after the town of the same name in Essex, England). Beyond that, the road originally followed the alignment of what is now Golf Course Drive and continued to the next creek crossing which is just before the current entrance to the golf club in Golf Course Drive. A more substantial wooden bridge spanned that winter creek which when flowing spilled out from under the bridge on the west side into a relatively deep pool before meandering along into what is now the Wilfred Taylor Reserve. The road then descended gradually to the intersection with Wheatsheaf Road before rising to seamlessly become the then gravel Coxs Hill Road, with the Panalatinga Road reserve continuing southwards as an unmade road until the 1970s or 1980s to the top of the steep gully of Emu Creek.

Later, there was a roundabout at the intersection with Reynell Road, which has since been upgraded to a signalised intersection. The intersections of Pimpala and Bains Roads had no traffic management system, as the eastern lengths of these roads were very undeveloped still, and mainly occupied by the said farming land, these intersections did not have a high level of danger associated with them at the time. In the 1970s and 1980s, Panalatinga Road was extended further to the south as a single track bitumen road, heading past Coxs Hill Road to the top of the aforementioned gully of Emu Creek. It is not clear when this section was re-named as St Vincent’s View. The road reserve continued across the gully of Emu Creek to align with what is currently known as Kimbley Road, which itself was an unmade dirt track through to Penney's Hill Road. It then continued as a dirt track to Piggott Range Road. This now closed section of the original Panalatinga Road reserve (where St Vincent’s View ends) remains to this day as an unmade road and with the terrain being far from flat the relatively steep sided gully was considered either unsafe or uneconomical to convert into a main thoroughfare when the northern portions of Panalatinga Road were upgraded in the 1990s.

== Extension ==
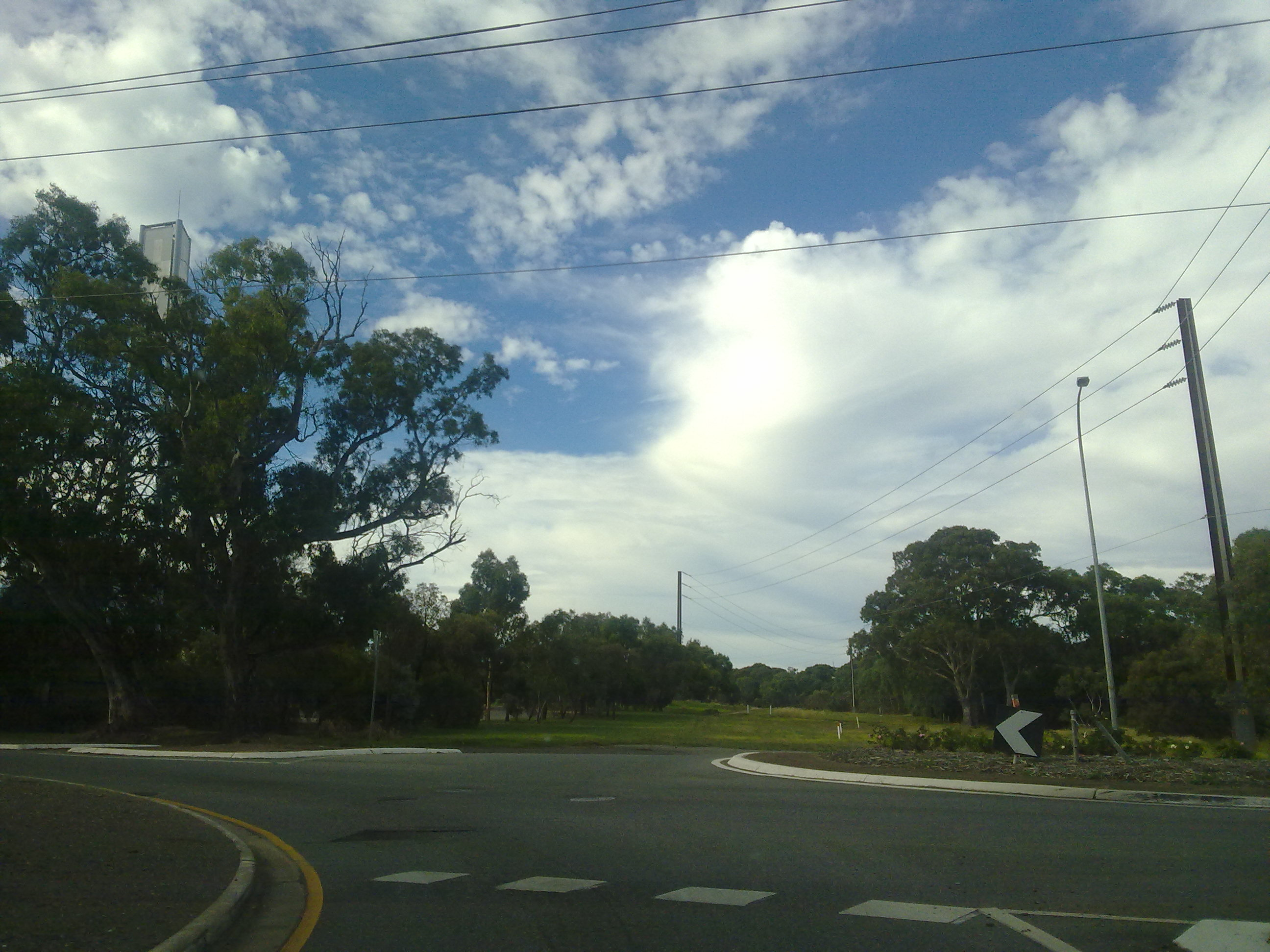
Looking east where Panalatinga Road can be extended at States Road and Doctors Road.

Since the upgrade of Panalatinga Road, and the termination of the road south of Coxs Hill Road, there has been an open area adjacent to Taylors Road which heads towards the roundabout of States and Doctors Road, that the South Australian Government has owned the land with the intention of eventually extending Panalatinga Road down to this point. This proposed road is listed in some road maps, as Margaret Road. Local power lines have been moved underground in preparation of this change, but the project has never been given the 'OK' to go ahead. For years, community members have requested this extension, but the government refuse to take action, claiming the Southern Expressway provides an adequate diversion for traffic off of Panalatinga Road, despite being significantly to the west, and not benefiting most drivers with destinations east of South Road. The current alternative to the extension, Wheatsheaf Road and States Road are often quite congested, particularly before and after school, with a number of schools within the vicinity. With the extension, through traffic could avoid this traffic. The Morphett Vale CFS would also majorly benefit from the extension, as it would reduce travel times to the Onkaparinga Hills, Woodcroft and Reynella, and would save them trying to fight the States Road traffic.

== Major intersections ==
Panalatinga Road is entirely contained within the City of Onkaparinga local government area.

Location	km	mi	Destinations	Notes
Trott Park–O'Halloran Hill–Happy Valley tripoint	0.0	0.0	Southern Expressway (M2 north) – Darlington, St Marys	Northern terminus of road, northbound entry and southbound exit only
Trott Park–O'Halloran Hill–Happy Valley tripoint	0.0	0.0	Main South Road (A13 northeast, southwest) – Old Noarlunga, Darlington, St Marys	
Morphett Vale–Woodcroft–Onkaparinga Hills tripoint	4.9	3.0	Wheatsheaf Road – Morphett Vale	
Onkaparinga Hills	5.6	3.5	St Vincents View – Onkaparinga Hills	
Onkaparinga Hills	5.6	3.5	Coxs Hill Road – Clarendon	Southern terminus of road, continues east as Coxs Hill Road
Route transition

== See also ==
Panalatinga Creek
