= Ignite (youth programme) =

IGNITE is a program for gifted and talented high school students in South Australia, created in 1997 and formerly known as SHIP (Students with High Intellectual Potential). It is administered by the South Australian Department of Education and Children's Services.

== Overview ==
Entrance into the IGNITE program requires students to sit an entrance exam at one of the three participating schools Aberfoyle Park High School, Glenunga International High School, or The Heights School. The test consists of reading comprehension, written literacy, mathematics and an abstract reasoning test, and is administered by ACER.

The top 25 students are given a chance to "skip" year 9 with the Ignite compacted course, these student can pick any of the following courses if they do not wish to do compacted: Maths accelerated (rank 25-50 needed), English accelerated (rank 50-75 needed) and Broad focus (75-100, or the waiting list, which does not "skip" any subject but does go into deeper study).
