= Wirreanda Secondary School =

Coordinates: 35°08′S 138°32′E

- Adelaide, South Australia; Australia

Information
- Type: Public
- Motto: Respect Responsibility Honesty Achievement
- Established: 1977
- Chair: Colin Jevons
- Principal: Karla Pobke
- Enrolment: 1090
- Campus: Wirreanda Secondary School
- Colours: blue, white, grey, naval green
- Website: http://www.wirreandasecondary.sa.edu.au/

Wirreanda Secondary School is a Government of South Australia public high school in Morphett Vale, Adelaide, South Australia. The school caters for students from Years seven to 12.

The school was established in 1977 and features a variety of special programs, including programmes to assist school leavers with entering the workforce. Wirreanda Secondary School is one of two Specialist Sports Schools in South Australia which offers a General sports course.

The word Wirreanda is an Indigenous Australian name for Place where wallabies live under tall trees. Derived from the Aboriginal wirra – 'gum tree' and ando – 'rock wallaby'.

== Special programs ==
=== Specialist Sport Course ===
The Specialist Sport Course at Wirreanda assists participants to develop skills, physical fitness, and knowledge in areas such as:

- exercise physiology
- coaching
- officiating
- biomechanics
- sports medicine
- sports psychology

Sports offered include:

- Australian Rules Football
- Netball
- Football
- Dance
- Basketball
- Surfing
- Cricket
- Volleyball
- and Outdoor Recreation.

=== International education ===
Wirreanda Secondary School offers a comprehensive International Student Program that includes Study Tours and a High School Graduate Program.

=== Flexible Learning Options and Transition to Employment ===
There are a number of programs at Wirreanda for students that are disengaged from learning, such as the Flexible Learning Options (FLO) or the Southern Collective Alternative Education Program (SCAEP). There are also programs available for students that wish to make the transition to employment.

SCAEP is an off-campus education program for Year 9 and Year 10 students with strong links to the community through organisations such as Mission Australia and ICAN.

The Wirreanda Adaptive Vocational Education (WAVE) program assists students that wish to transition from school to employment.

== Curriculum ==
=== Middle school ===
In Years 7, 8 and 9. Students must study:

- PBL
- Health and Physical Education

Students can study these subjects

- Arts (including Visual Arts, Drama and Music)
- Home Economics
- Language (Spanish)
- Technology (including Computing and Technical Studies)

In year 9 students do not study PBL must study something called ICS (Inquiry Centred Studies)

=== Senior school ===
In year 10 students must study these compulsory programs

- ICS (Inquiry Centred Studies)
- Health and Physical Education
- English
- HASS

Students participate in the specialised studies they have chosen and work to complete their SACE. Informal contact is maintained with students, and encouragement given for them to continue to use the SHIP room computers and facilities.

== Old location ==
Wirreanda was formerly located slightly south of its current location, being bordered between Chappel Avenue, Blundel Street and Richards Drive, however once the old Emu Winery was demolished, the new school was built in its current location between States Road, Richards Drive and McCartney Street.

== Notable alumni ==
- Ryan Fitzgerald – Former AFL player, Big Brother participant and current radio host on Nova 96.9.
- Paul Paddick – Children's entertainer who plays Captain Feathersword in The Wiggles.
- Megan Schutt – Australian international cricketer.
- Jason Horne-Francis – Professional AFL player.
