= Southern Expressway, Adelaide =

Expressway in Adelaide, South Australia

Southern Expressway South Australia
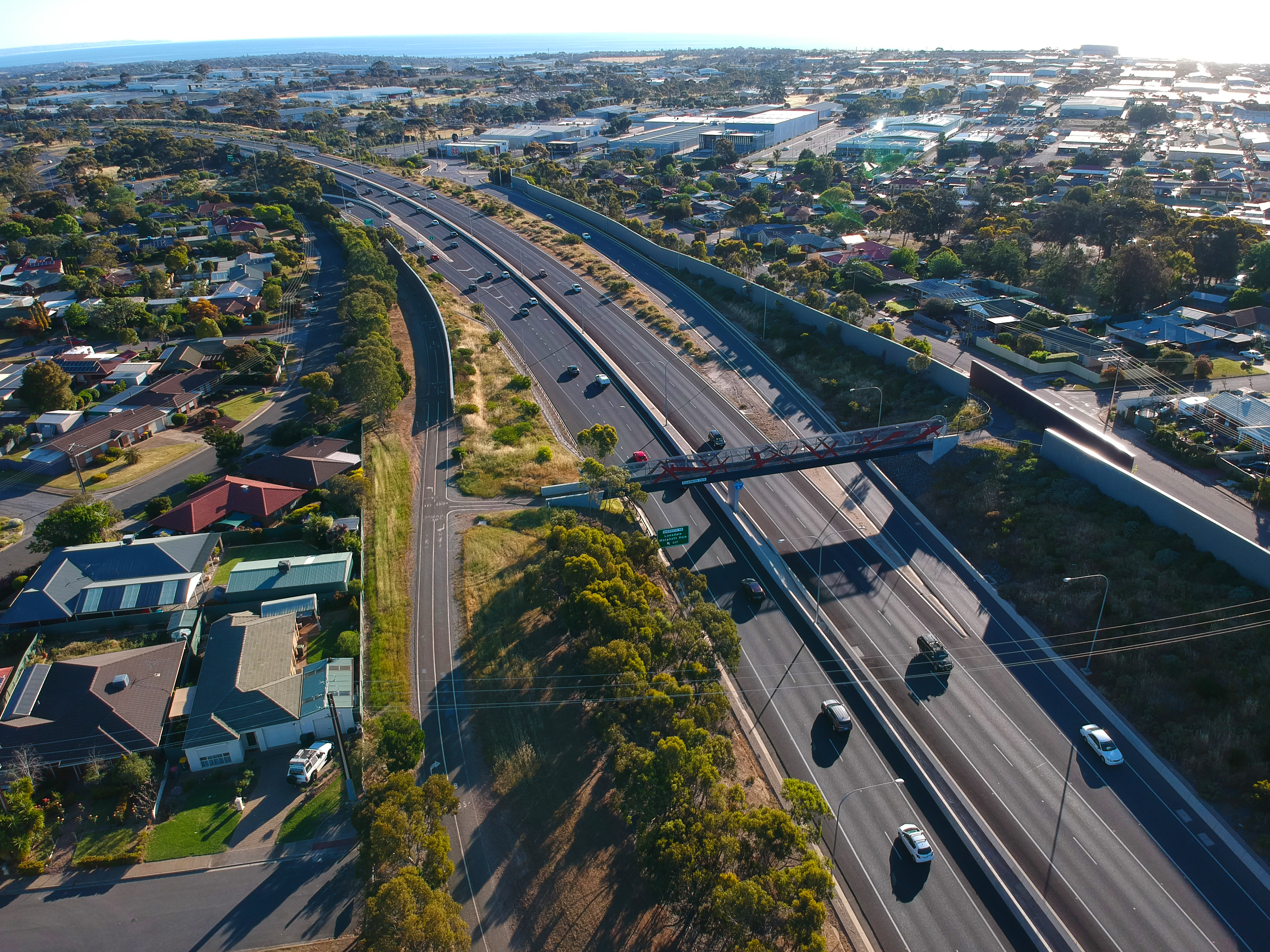
- Southern Expressway passing Reynella
- Coordinates: 35.005461°S 138.575802°E (North end); 35.166170°S 138.508034°E (South end)

General information
- Type: Freeway
- Length: 20.7 km (13 mi)
- Opened: 1997-2014
- Route number(s): M2 (1998–present)

Major junctions
- North end: South Road; St Marys, Adelaide
- Marion Road
- South end: Main South Road; Old Noarlunga, Adelaide

Location(s)
- Region: Southern Adelaide
- Major suburbs / towns: Tonsley, Darlington, Trott Park, Reynella, Noarlunga Downs

Highway system
- Highways in Australia; National Highway • Freeways in Australia; Highways in South Australia

Southern Expressway is an 18.5 km (11.5 mi) freeway through the southern suburbs of Adelaide, South Australia. It is the southern part of the North–South Corridor which extends the full length of Adelaide and is being built to urban freeway standard. It is designated part of route M2.

It was built as a corridor to relieve heavy traffic from the major arterial, Main South Road in Adelaide's south, originally as a reversible one way freeway, and was the world's longest after its completion in 2001. Between 2010 and 2014, it was duplicated and it is now a standard dual-carriageway freeway.

Construction of the expressway included the Adelaide Southern Veloway for cyclists, which runs alongside it for 7 km, from Marion/Main South Road to the Reynella Interchange. South of the Reynella Interchange, the bikeway becomes a shared track for the remaining 12 km of the expressway. The expressway crosses over the Coast to Vines Rail Trail at both Panalatinga Road and at the expressway's southern end.

== Route ==
Southern Expressway starts in the central median of South Road in St Marys, and continues southwest in a lowered trench between the carriageways of South Road, until it crosses the Sturt River. It continues in a south-westerly direction in its own alignment, running roughly parallel to Main South Road through Reynella to eventually terminate at an intersection with it just north of Old Noarlunga.

== History ==
=== Pre-construction ===
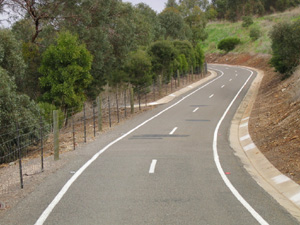
The Adelaide Southern Veloway

The expressway is the southern part of a north–south freeway originally conceptualised under the Metropolitan Adelaide Transport Study (MATS), completed in 1965, as a freeway bypassing the city from Dry Creek to Old Noarlunga. The MATS plan proved unpopular, and in 1971 all further highway construction in Adelaide was postponed for a period of ten years. In 1983 plans for a freeway north of Darlington were abandoned, and the land that had been set aside was progressively sold off.

In 1984 the state government announced plans to develop a "third arterial road" for the south. In 1987 the project was split into two phases: the first was the upgrading of Main South Road and Marion Road in the Darlington area, and the second was a new road from Darlington to Reynella. Phase one was completed in 1994 with the widening of Main South Road to eight lanes between Ayliffes Road and Seacombe Road, and the widening of Marion Road to six lanes between Main South Road and Sturt Road.

Phase 2 became the expressway, which was constructed in two stages: from Darlington to Reynella, and from Reynella to Old Noarlunga. It was developed as a one-way reversible road, with future duplication provided for in the roadworks base, to be constructed when the need arose. It used the remaining "Noarlunga Freeway" reservation, except for the northernmost kilometre, where a new route through O'Halloran Hill was chosen to provide high-quality links with Marion and Main South Roads without interfering with existing infrastructure at Sturt.

=== Construction of the reversible freeway ===
Construction of the expressway commenced in July 1995 and the first stage was opened to traffic on 17 December 1997. Construction commenced on the second stage in February 1999 and was opened to traffic on 9 September 2001. The total cost of the reversible freeway was A$76.5m.

==== Promotional FM radio transmitter ====
During its construction and for some time after its opening, the expressway was promoted via a dedicated FM radio station established by the Department of Transport, broadcasting via a low-power FM transmitter in the immediate vicinity of the road. The radio station broadcast a recorded message on continuous loop featuring promotional and community information messages relating to the expressway, including a jingle that Transport Minister Diana Laidlaw declared made the expressway the only road in the world to have its own jingle.

=== Operation as a one way road ===
Until 2014, the expressway was open approximately 21 hours per day, one way for over 10 hours in each direction. The northbound (city-bound) direction occurred on weekday mornings (2:00 am – 12:30 pm) and weekend evenings (2:00 pm – 12:30 am). The southbound direction was open on weekday evenings (2:00 pm – 12:30 am) and weekend mornings (2:00 am – 12:30 pm). It was closed 12:30–2:00 am and 12:30–2:00 pm, except for Saturday and Monday mornings when the direction remained unchanged. Weekday public holidays operated under the weekend's opening times to accommodate tourists travelling to the Fleurieu Peninsula. During each closure all road signs, lights and boom gates changed over, and the road was inspected by a tow truck contractor for debris and car breakdowns.

=== Duplication ===
In 2007, the Howard government pledged $100m towards widening the expressway in its unsuccessful re-election bid.

In February 2010, during the state election campaign, Premier Mike Rann announced that, if re-elected, the expressway would be duplicated in a A$445m project. The inclusion of a new A$75m interchange at Darlington was later scrapped, after the government planning for a major transport hub at Darlington discovered the need for a $50 million section of road that would have to be destroyed when the expressway was eventually duplicated.

Once duplication was announced in 2010, construction started in 2011. Due to the duplication of the expressway, all of the bridges had to be widened to meet the new width of the road. Some road bridges were closed during the work needed, and others required a temporary lower speed limit for safety reasons; this caused some anger to residents and businesses. The new carriageway (dedicated to northbound traffic) was built entirely on the western side of the original roadway, two lanes wide between Old Noarlunga and O'Halloran Hill, and four between O'Halloran Hill and Sturt. Accessibility has been improved, with completely new interchanges at Beach Road and Sheriffs Road, as well as being able to left turn out at Old Noarlunga, a right turn out at Marion Road, and a left turn in at Marion Road. The expressway opened to two-way traffic in August 2014 and a cost of about A$400m.

=== Darlington Upgrade ===
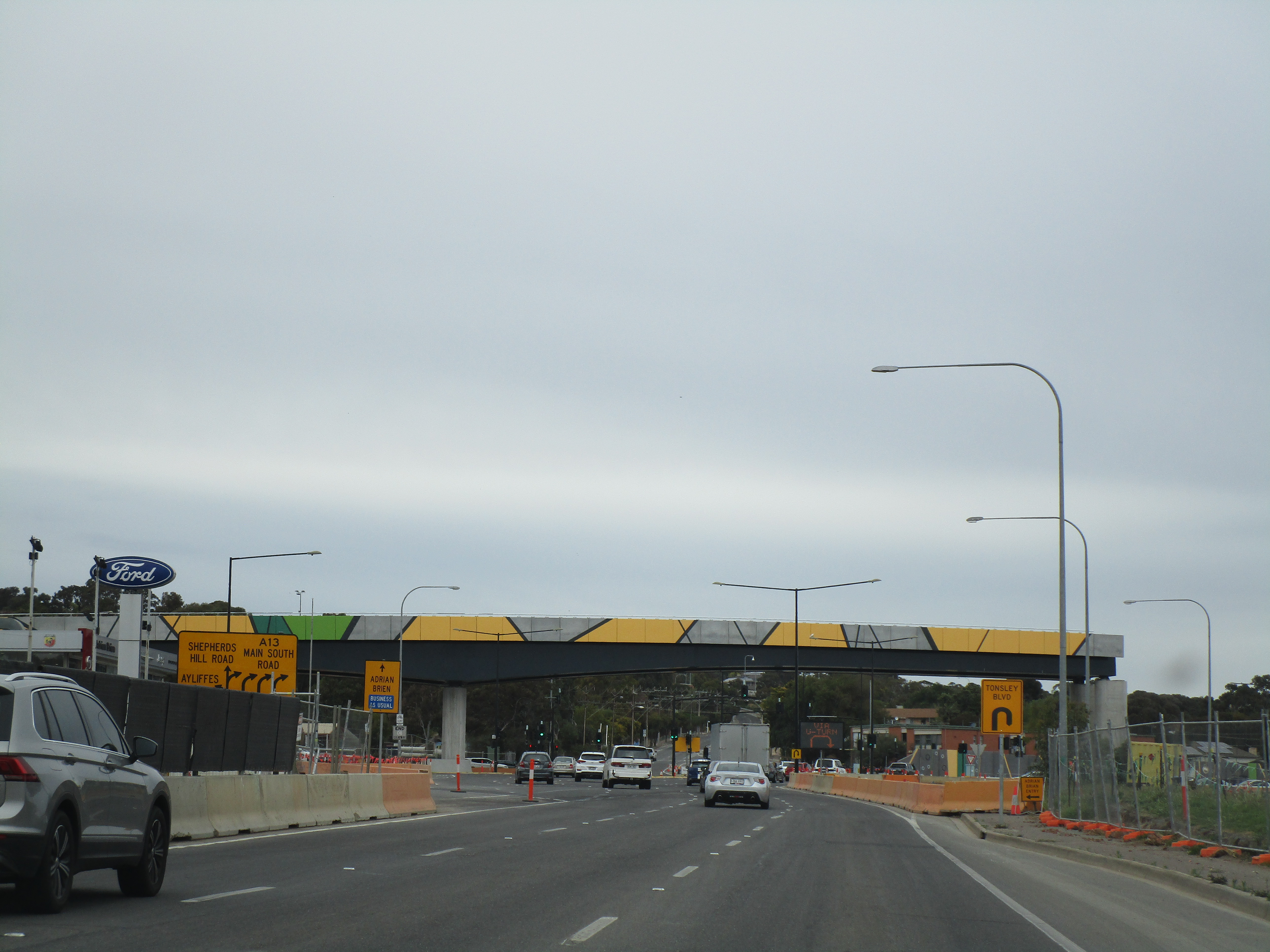
Ayliffes Road bridge: The above-ground road bridges were assembled on-site and moved into their final position using multi-wheeled lifters.

In 2014, the plans for an interchange at Darlington were revived and expanded to extend the Southern Expressway through Darlington. The original project scope was to extend the expressway with a lowered motorway corridor. The corridor passing underneath Flinders Drive (access to Flinders University and Flinders Medical Centre), Sturt Road and a bridge connecting local streets Mimosa Terrace and Sutton Road, to the intersection of South Road, Ayliffes Road and Shepherds Hill Road with surface-level service roads and segregated cycling and pedestrian paths.

The project was later revised to continue the extension past Tonsley, giving a total length of 3.3 kilometres. A road bridge, accessible from the Main South Road surface road and the lowered motorway, allows northbound traffic free-flowing access to Ayliffes Road. The associated Flinders Link Project extended the Tonsley railway line over this corridor to Flinders Medical Centre.

Early works commenced late in 2014. Gateway South, a joint venture of Fulton Hogan and Laing O'Rourke, was awarded the major works contract for the project in January 2016. Major works commenced in 2016 for an expected project completion in 2018, later revised to December 2019. Completion was delayed to 2020 due to sections of the lowered motorway wall collapsing. Construction was completed and the lowered motorway fully opened to traffic in August 2020. Final road surfacing was completed in late November through to early December 2020.

=== Majors Road interchange ===
Following the 2022 South Australian state election, the incoming Malinauskas government initiated the addition of an exit at Majors Road near the top of the first climb up from the Adelaide Plains. The project was expected to cost $120 million, equally funded by state and federal governments. The project was completed and opened to traffic on 11 October 2025.

== Exits and intersections ==
| LGA | Location | km | mi | Destinations | Notes |
|---|---|---|---|---|---|
| Marion–Mitcham boundary | Tonsley–St Marys boundary | 0.0 | 0.0 | South Road (A2) – Edwardstown, Mile End, Hindmarsh | Northern terminus of expressway and route M2, route A2 continues north along South Road |
| Marion–Mitcham boundary | Bedford Park–St Marys boundary | 1.0 | 0.62 | Ayliffes Road (east) – Pasadena, Goodwood; Shepherds Hill Road (south) – Blackwood | No right turn northbound from Ayliffes Road westbound Northbound entry to and southbound exit from Shepherds Hill Road only |
| Marion–Mitcham boundary | Bedford Park | 2.1 | 1.3 | Main South Road (A13) – Darlington, Happy Valley | Original northern terminus, northbound entry and southbound exit only |
| Marion | Sturt–Bedford Park boundary | 2.8 | 1.7 | Marion Road (A14) – Marion, Glenelg | Southbound entry and northbound exit only |
| Marion | O'Halloran Hill–Trott Park boundary | 6.6 | 4.1 | Majors Road – Hallett Cove, O'Halloran Hill | |
| Marion-Onkaparinga boundary | Trott Park–O'Halloran Hill boundary | 9.5 | 5.9 | Main South Road (A13 northeast, southwest) – Reynella; Panalatinga Road (south) – Old Reynella, Woodcroft | Northbound entry and southbound exit only |
| Onkaparinga | Reynella–Lonsdale–Morphett Vale tripoint | 14.0 | 8.7 | Sheriffs Road – Lonsdale, Morphett Vale, Reynella | |
| Onkaparinga | Morphett Vale–Christie Downs–Noarlunga Centre–Hackham West quadripoint | 17.6 | 10.9 | Beach Road – Noarlunga Centre | |
| Onkaparinga | Huntfield Heights–Noarlunga Downs–Hackham tripoint | 20.7 | 12.9 | Main South Road (A13) – Cape Jervis, Victor Harbor | Southern terminus of expressway and route M2 |
Incomplete access; Route transition

== See also ==
- Freeways in Australia
- Freeways in South Australia
