= Morphett Vale, South Australia =

Morphett Vale
- Suburb
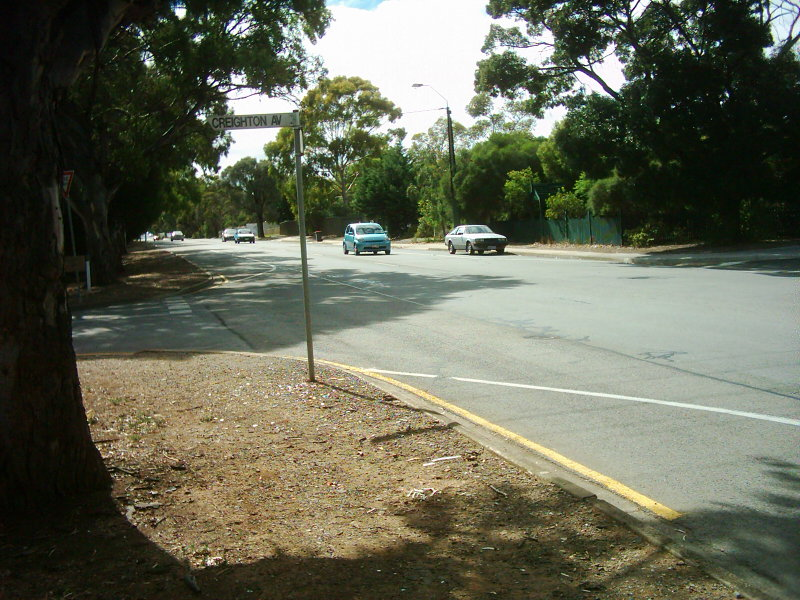
- Wheatsheaf Road, facing east

- Country: Australia
- State: South Australia
- Region: Southern Adelaide
- City: Adelaide
- LGA: City of Onkaparinga
- Established: 1840

Government
  - State electorates: Hurtle Vale; Reynell
  - Federal division: Kingston

Area
  - Total: 12.76 km^{2} (4.93 sq mi)

Population
  - Total: 24,002 (SAL 2021)
- Postcode: 5162
- County: Adelaide
Suburbs around Morphett Vale
Lonsdale	Reynella	Old Reynella
Christie Downs	Morphett Vale	Woodcroft
Noarlunga Centre	Hackham	Onkaparinga Hills

Morphett Vale is a southern suburb of Adelaide, South Australia in the City of Onkaparinga. It is the largest suburb in the state, with a population of more than 23,000 and an area of 12.76 km^{2}, followed by Paralowie with nearly 10,000 fewer residents. There are approximately 1,000 businesses in Morphett Vale. The suburb is bordered by (clockwise from north) Sheriffs/Pimpala Road, Panalatinga Road, Doctors/Beach Road, and the Southern Expressway.

== History ==
Morphett Vale was the first major town south of Adelaide. In October 1840, a town called Dublin was subdivided leading to the development of Morphett Vale. By 1866, the town was said to have 'a large number of neat residences, many of which have fine vineyards attached'.

Morphett Vale was named after John Morphett. The town quickly boasted churches and chapels, a brewery, wind flour mill, court house and police station.

Agriculture consisted of cereal, mixed farms and vineyards. 1852 saw the formation of the Morphett Vale District council which merged with Noarlunga in 1932. During the second world war the district was a major producer of flax.

Extensive land subdivision occurred during the 1960s, transforming the area from a rural region to a metropolitan suburb.

Some notable buildings and businesses include: Doctors House on the corner of Beach and Main South Roads (In the suburb of Hackham, one of the boundary suburbs), The Emu winery which was later demolished to make way for Wirreanda High School and a housing sub-division. The Heritage listed Old Courthouse is visible alongside early churches in William Street.

The Willunga railway line ran through the town until 1969, but has since been replaced by a bicycle/pedestrian path. The old Station Master's Residence is now the Southern Districts Workingman's Club and has been substantially remodelled to its current form. The last tenants of this building (Dopheide) are still residents of the Local Onkaparinga Council area.

On 7 October 1992, twelve-year-old Rhianna Ann Barreau went missing from her home in Morphett Vale. Having never been solved, her case has attracted continued media attention.

== Country Fire Service ==
The Morphett Vale Country Fire Service station is located on the corner of Doctors Road and States Road at Hackham. It is an entirely volunteer based brigade which has an active fire-fighter membership of around 50 volunteers. The brigade is one of the busiest in the state, responding to between 300 and 400 emergencies each year on average. The suburbs primarily covered by the brigade are Morphett Vale, Hackham, Onkaparinga Hills, Reynella and Woodcroft. These suburbs include approximately 25,000 residents as well as industrial zones and large areas of rural land.

The Morphett Vale fire brigade currently has three appliances. Morphett Vale Pumper and Morphett Vale 34 are supplied by the government, whilst Morphett Vale QRV is a brigade owned appliance and was designed and built by the brigade.

== Schools ==
Morphett Vale boasts a number of schools within its boundaries including:

=== Primary schools ===
- Antonio Catholic School
- Calvary Lutheran School
- Coorara Primary School
- Flaxmill Primary School
- Morphett Vale Primary School (former Morphett Vale High School)
- Morphett Vale East Primary School
- Morphett Vale West Primary School
- Pimpala Primary School
- Stanvac Primary School
- Sunrise Christian School
- John Morphett Primary School

=== R-12 schools ===
- Prescott College Southern
- Southern Vales Christian College
- Woodcroft College

=== Secondary schools ===
- Wirreanda High School

Former schools in the area

- In 2000, Morphett Vale South Primary School was closed. The site, located on Elizabeth Road next to the Elizabeth Road local shops, has now been completely cleared and turned into a housing estate.
- Morphett Vale High School closed at the end of 2008. Original government plans for the site were to demolish the entire school and redevelop it into a new housing development, but after much objection from the community, mainly due to the school's oval regularly being used for club sporting events predominately football, it is the home ground of the OSBLFC. The school has been renovated, and transformed into a primary school, which opened in 2012.

== Sporting clubs and grounds ==
- Morphett Vale Cricket Club - Morphett Vale Memorial Oval, Wheatsheaf Road
- Morphett Vale Memorial Bowls Club – Morphett Vale Memorial Oval, Wheatsheaf Road
- Morphett Vale Football Club – Morphett Vale Memorial Oval, Wheatsheaf Road
- Morphett Vale Tennis Club – Morphett Vale Memorial Oval, Wheatsheaf Road
- Morphett Vale Netball Club – Morphett Vale Memorial Oval, Wheatsheaf Road
- Noarlunga Tigers Basketball Club – Wilfred Taylor Reserve, States Road
- Noarlunga United Soccer Club – Wilfred Taylor Reserve, States Road
- O'Sullivan Beach-Lonsdale Football Club – Morphett Vale Primary School, Sheriffs Road
- Onkaparinga Rugby Club – Wilfred Taylor Reserve, States Road
