= Chandlers Hill, South Australia =

Chandlers Hill
- Suburb
- Country: Australia
- State: South Australia
- Region: Southern Adelaide
- City: Adelaide
- LGA: City of Onkaparinga

Government
  - State electorate: Davenport
  - Federal divisions: Kingston; Mayo

Population
  - Total: 792 (SAL 2021)
- Postcode: 5159
- County: Adelaide
Suburbs around Chandlers Hill
Flagstaff Hill	Coromandel Valley	Coromandel East
Aberfoyle Park; Happy Valley; Woodcroft	Chandlers Hill	Cherry Gardens
Onkaparinga Hills	Clarendon	Clarendon

Chandlers Hill is a suburb of Adelaide, South Australia. It lies within the City of Onkaparinga and has postcode 5159.
