= Happy Valley, South Australia =

Happy Valley
- Suburb
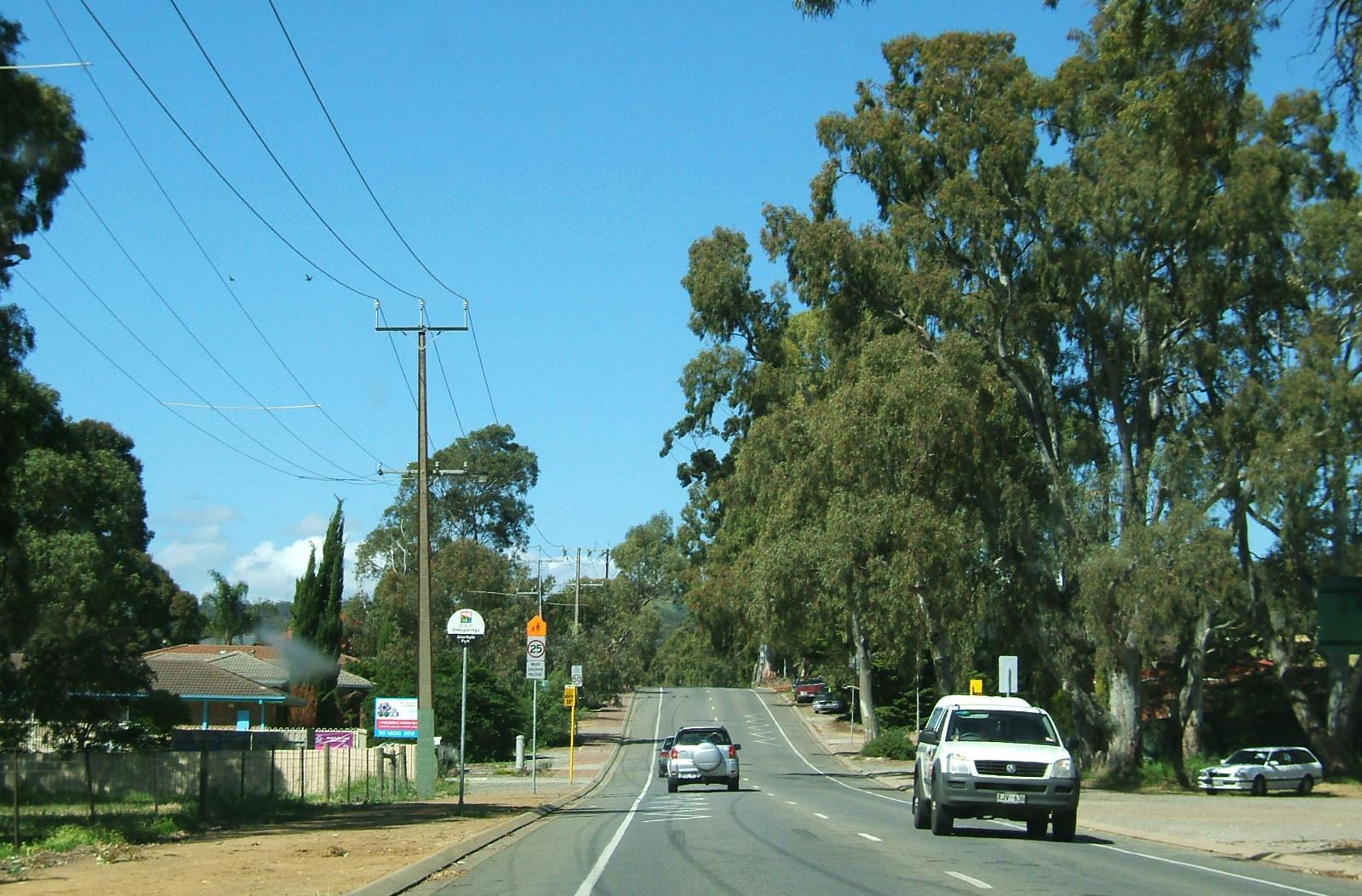
- Western end of Windebanks Drive

- Coordinates: 35°04′59″S 138°34′01″E
- Country: Australia
- State: South Australia
- Region: Southern Adelaide
- City: Adelaide
- LGA: City of Onkaparinga
- Location: 20 km (12 mi) from Adelaide

Government
  - State electorates: Davenport; Hurtle Vale
  - Federal division: Kingston

Population
  - Total: 11,420 (SAL 2021)
- Postcode: 5159
- County: Adelaide
Suburbs around Happy Valley
O'Halloran Hill	Flagstaff Hill	Aberfoyle Park
Reynella East	Happy Valley	Chandlers Hill
Woodcroft	Onkaparinga Hills	Clarendon

Happy Valley is a metropolitan suburb of Adelaide, South Australia. It is located 20 km south of the Central Business District of Adelaide.

Within the suburb is the Happy Valley Reservoir accompanied by South Australia's largest water treatment plant, responsible for supplying water to much of the Adelaide metropolitan area.

Although it is now encompassed by suburbs, it still retains a relatively semi-rural character due to retention of native flora and vegetation surrounding the Happy Valley Reservoir, as well as parklands and golf courses along its border.

== History ==
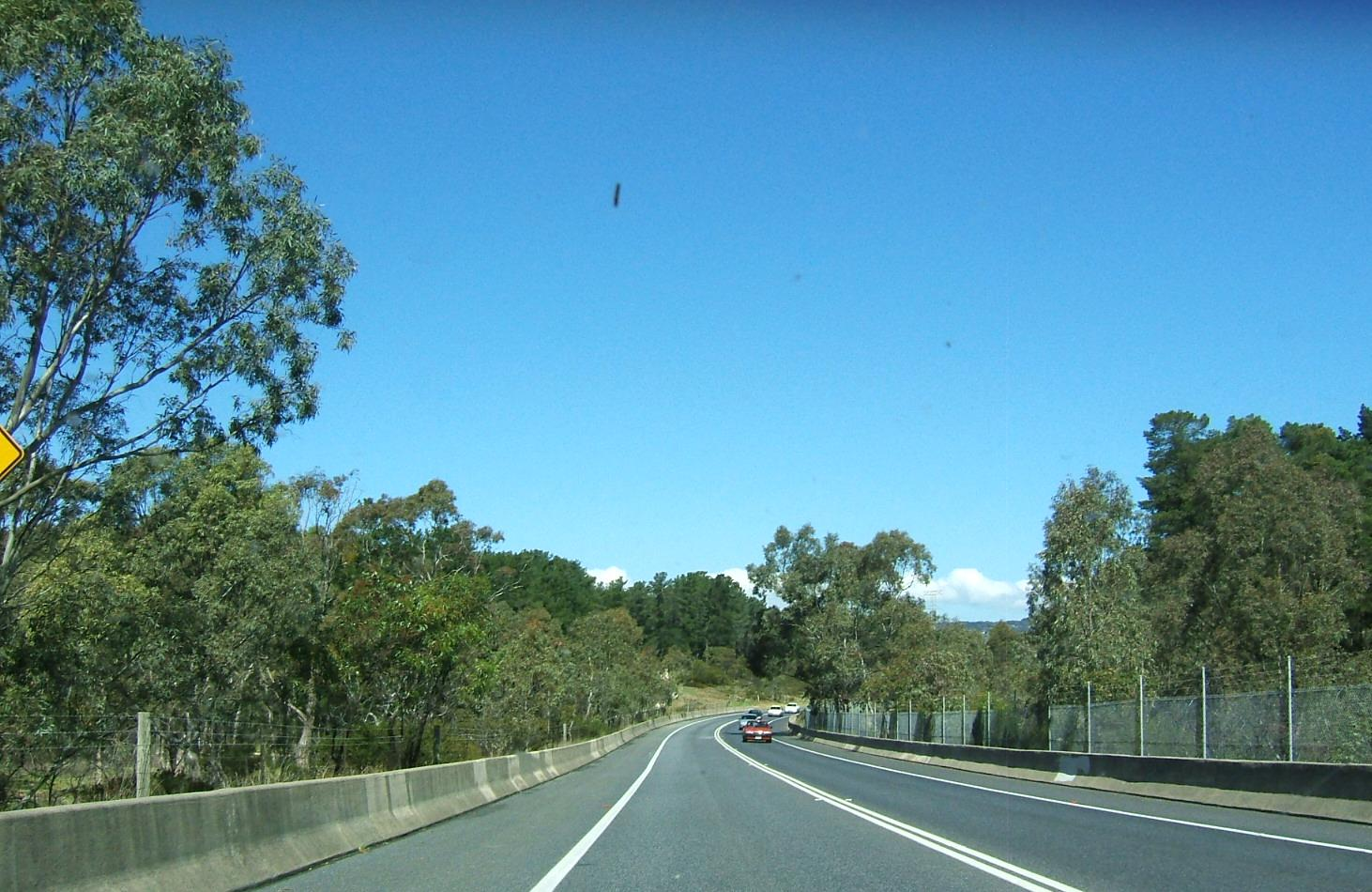
Happy Valley Drive

In November 1844, Daniel George Brock recorded in his diary details of a journey south from Adelaide. On his third day he rode past Thomas O’Halloran's farm, on the hill noting that the land had little running water and was suitable for wheat farming. Some few kilometres to the east he came to Happy Valley. There, he noted, were 'several substantial stone buildings, among which is a neat little chapel'.

Originally known by the Kaurna name of "Warekila" meaning 'place of changing winds', Happy Valley, a source suggested, was given its name by Edward Burgess, one of the first settlers in the area. Burgess, a staunch Methodist, arrived at Holdfast Bay on 20 January 1837. At some time during the next two years, Burgess made his home at Happy Valley and began farming. He was not alone: the South Australian Company had also purchased significant amounts of land in the area and was offering it to the settlers.

By 1866, Happy Valley was described as 'an agricultural settlement lying near Dashwood's Gully, a good district road connecting the two places. It lies near the postal village of O’Halloran Hill. There is a public pound and a Forester's court in this place.' By this time, too, wheat farming had been joined by wine grape growing.

Following construction of the reservoir, the original Happy Valley township, school and cemetery were completely flooded requiring their relocation. The township was moved some 4 km to the east while the cemetery, which is still in use today, was moved to the west and relocated alongside the base of the dam wall in what is now the suburb of O'Halloran Hill. The school, originally located on Candy road, was relocated south to two acres of land on Red Hill Road (later renamed Education road) which was donated by local farmer Harry Mason. While some students attended O'Halloran Hill or Clarendon schools for the 18 months that the Happy Valley school was closed, some did not attend any school until it was re-opened on 26 September 1898. The school closed in December 1979 and re-opened on a new site on the other side of the road directly opposite.

Myths abound that the spire of the original church steeple protrudes from the water when the Happy Valley reservoir's capacity is low, and that the town exists, submerged in the depths. This is incorrect, as all buildings were demolished and all salvageable materials – primarily fruit trees and vines – sold off before the area was flooded. Staff responsible for the site at the time of the rumoured church sightings explain that a pump frame was then installed in the location in question which was visible at low water. At any rate, maps of pre-reservoir land parcels show that the location of the original church was not next to the 'scour' tower, but rather under the present dam wall, opposite the current church at the Candy's Road/Chandler's Hill Road junction. Between 2002 and 2004, the Reservoir was drained when it underwent a major renovation as part of A$22 million rehabilitation project aimed at enhancing the Reservoir to meet guidelines of best practice for dam management. With the lowering of the water level during renovations exposing the original Happy Valley township for the first time, archaeologists took the opportunity to excavate the site. Very little was found apart from scattered bricks and the foundations of several buildings of which only the Post Office was identified.

In 1959, the name Happy Valley was first applied to a subdivision of Section 501, hundred of Noarlunga. By the 1970s, the pressure of further subdivision was beginning to erode the area's heritage. In 1983 the District Council of Meadows, stretching from rural towns of Meadows and Echunga in the east to Happy Valley in the north west, was renamed to City of Happy Valley in recognition of the population growth in Happy Valley and its urban surrounds that had caused the council district population to exceed 10,000.

== Railway ==
Happy Valley was a station on the Hallett Cove-Willunga railway line from 1915 until 1969. The station is now completely dismantled and the site is now the location of the Panalatinga Road interchange of the Southern Expressway and Main South Road.

== Country Fire Service ==
The Happy Valley CFS established in 1939 is currently located on Glory Ct just off of Education Rd in Happy Valley. It is an entirely volunteer based brigade with a mixture of active fire fighters, cadets and auxiliary fire fighters and members. On average Happy Valley CFS will respond to over 250+ calls per year ranging from fixed alarms and structure fires to major bushfires and strike team deployments. The suburbs primarily covered by the brigade are Happy Valley, Woodcroft, Onkaparinga Hills, Aberfoyle Park and Flagstaff Hill. Also, Happy Valley CFS will respond into the Metropolitan Fire Service (MFS) areas to assist with any emergencies the MFS may need assistance with. Happy Valley CFS also trains with the MFS to cover the Flinders Medical Centre in Bedford Park. Both turn out to any incidents at the hospital with the first arriving service taking control of the incident.

Three fire appliances are maintained by the brigade: one 2000 litre two wheel drive Urban Pumping truck used for urban emergencies (Pumper); one 3000 litre four wheel drive Rural truck that is fitted with a larger capacity pump, suitable for structure fires and incidents requiring large volumes of water (34P) which is supplied by the South Australian State Government; and a smaller 280 litre quick response vehicle that was purchased by the brigade(QRV).

== See also ==
- List of Adelaide suburbs
