= John Reynell =

Australian winemaker (1809–1873)

John Reynell.

John Reynell (9 February 1809 – 15 June 1873) was an English-born emigrant to the colony of South Australian where he became established as a wheat farmer, a sheep and cattle breeder, and a vigneron and winemaker.

Reynell was born in Ilfracombe in 1809 from a Devonshire farming family. The Reynell family became established at East Ogwell in Devon in the 14th century. Accompanied by his cousin Samuel Reynell (c. 1818–1892), he arrived in South Australia in October 1838 aboard Surrey and established his property about 20 kilometres south of the main settlement of Adelaide near the area that became known as McLaren Vale.

Reynell is thought to have established the first commercial vineyard and winery in South Australia by planting vine cuttings in 1839 that he had bought at the Cape of Good Hope. Other sources say that in 1841 he planted the first vineyard with 500 cuttings from Tasmania, and made wine in 1843. Reynell employed a young man named Thomas Hardy (who also became a famed winemaker) to help him to tend to the vineyards. They became the largest wine producers in the McLaren Vale region. The first vintage was produced in 1842. He built the Old Cave cellar in 1845 – the cellar survives to the present day. He pioneered the export of claret and burgundy to New Zealand.

In 1839 Reynell was one of the fifty settlers who formed the Agricultural and Horticultural Society of South Australia.

On 31 January 1839 Reynell married Mary Anne Lucas and had three children: a daughter Lucy Reynell (1842–1921) (who married Ross T. Reid of Gawler), Lydia Reynell (d.1904 aged 60 years), and a son Walter Reynell (1846–1919) (who married Emily Bakewell (1851–1887), a daughter of William Bakewell MP. Walter's daughter Gladys Reynell became one of Australia's earliest studio potters.

In 1854 Reynell sold about 40 acres (16 ha) of the Reynella farm land to create the township of Reynella, which has now become the Adelaide suburb of Old Reynella. The South Australian electoral district of Reynell and the suburbs of Reynella, and Reynella East are also named after him.

== Life ==
- 1838, 16 October Arrived aboard the sailing ship Surry, 29 years of age.
- 1838, Oct/Nov – Planted first vine cuttings for source stock on banks of Field River at Surryville.
- 1839, 31 January – married Mary Lucas at Holy Trinity Church, North Terrace, Adelaide.
- 1839, 12 March – Acquired his land selection, Section 524 in Hurtle Vale and called it Reynella Farm.
- 1839, Transferred rooted vine cuttings from Surryville to Reynella Farm, establishment of Stony Hill Vineyard, first vineyard for commercial winemaking in South Australia.
- 1839, Became one of the foundation members of what is now the Royal Agriculture and Horticulture Society.
- 1840, May – John and Mary moved into the first home on banks of Panalatinga Creek, Reynella Farm.
- 1842, Built and moved into second home on land – section 538 – opposite original holding (current site of existing winery complex). The cottage structure is still evident as the northern wing of the existing homestead.
- 1845, dug Cellar Number 1, commonly known as the Old Cave – this was one of Australia's first underground wine cellars.

== See also ==
- Old Reynella History
- Hardy Wine Company
