= List of closed railway stations in Adelaide =

Closed railway stations in Adelaide, South Australia

A number of railway lines and stations which formed part of the greater Adelaide rail network have been closed and removed over time. Most railway lines have been taken over by housing developments, only a very few have been converted into rail trails. In addition, most of the stations have been demolished. The most recent railway line to close to traffic was the GMH Elizabeth railway line, which was closed in 1992 due to declining traffic. A number of stations have also been closed and rebuilt such as Ovingham or Bowden. For closed railway stations in rural outer South Australia, see List of closed railway stations in South Australia.

== Closed railway lines ==
- Northfield line, opened 1 June 1857 (closed 1987)
- Penfield line, opened 1941, (closed 1991)
- Henley Beach line, extension of Grange line, opened 1894 (closed 1957)
- Finsbury line, opened 1940 (closed 1978)
- GMH Elizabeth line, opened 1959 (closed 1992)
- Dry Creek-Port Dock line, opened 1 February 1868 (closed to passengers 1988, now freight only)
- Hendon line, opened 1940 (closed 1980)
- Semaphore line, opened 7 January 1878 (closed 1978)
- Willunga line, opened 20 January 1915 (closed 1969, now the Coast to Vines Rail Trail)
- Bridgewater line, extension of Belair line, opened 1883 (closed to passengers 1987, converted to standard gauge 1995)
- Holdfast Bay line, opened 24 May 1880 (closed 1929, now the Westside Bikeway)
- Glenelg line, opened 2 August 1873 (converted into the Glenelg tram line in 1929)
- Jubilee Exhibition line, opened 1887, never carried regular passenger services (closed 1927)

== Closed railway lines and their stations ==
Jubilee Exhibition Railway (closed 1925)

Serviced the Adelaide Jubilee International Exhibition, Torrens Parade Ground and original location of Adelaide Showground direct from Adelaide railway station.

Holdfast Bay railway line (closed 14 December 1929)

- Thebarton
- Hilton
- Richmond
- Kurralta Park
- Plympton Coursing Ground (closed c.1925)
- Plympton
- Morphettville
- Camden
- Novar Gardens
- Macdonalds
- Golf Links (closed by 1929)
- St Leonards (closed 1926)
- Glenelg

St Leonards–Grange railway line

Glenelg railway line (closed 1929 and converted to Glenelg tram line)

- Victoria Square (closed 1914)
- South Terrace
- Wayville
- Goodwood Road
- Forestville
- Black Forest
- Hayhurst
- South Plympton
- Morphettville
- Helmsdale
- Miller's Corner
- Glenelg

Northfield (closed 1987)

Branched from the Gawler line at Dry Creek.

- Cavan (closed 1987)
- Pooraka (closed 1987)
- Northfield (closed 1987)
- Stockade (closed 1961)

Penfield (closed 1991)

Branched from the Gawler line at Salisbury.

- Hilra
- Penfield 1
- Penfield 2
- Penfield 3'

GMH Elizabeth (closed 1992)

Branched from the Gawler line approximately halfway between Elizabeth South and Nurlutta stations.

Served the General Motors Holden Elizabeth car factory at Elizabeth.

Henley Beach railway line

An extension of Grange railway line.

- Kirkcaldy
- Marlborough Street
- Henley Beach

Hendon railway line (closed 1 February 1980)

Branched from the Grange line at Albert Park station.

- Hendon

Semaphore railway line (closed 29 October 1978)

Branched from the Outer Harbor line at Glanville station, traversing Jetty Road to the pier / jetty.

- Exeter
- Semaphore

Finsbury railway line (closed 17 August 1979)

Branched from the Outer Harbor line starting Woodville station.

- Actil (closed 1970)
- Woodville North (closed 1979)
- No. 18 Shed (closed 1979)
- Finsbury Stores (closed 1979)

Willunga railway line (closed 1969, track lifted 1972, now Coast to Vines Rail Trail)

Original route alignment beyond Hallett Cove.

- Patpa
- Happy Valley
- Reynella
- Pimpala
- Coorara
- Morphett Vale
- Yetto
- Hackham
- Korro
- Noarlunga
- Moana
- Tuni
- McLaren Vale
- Pikkara
- Taringa
- Willunga

Dry Creek-Port Adelaide (closed to passengers 27 May 1988, now freight only)

- Wingfield (closed 29 May 1987)
- North Arm Road (closed 29 May 1987)
- Eastern Parade (closed 29 May 1987)
- Rosewater Loop (closed to freight 2008)
- Grand Junction Road (closed 27 May 1988)
- Rosewater (closed 27 May 1988)
- Port Dock (closed 1981)
  - Birkenhead Loop (closed to freight 2008)
  - ICI Osborne (closed to passengers 1980, closed to freight 2014)
    - Coal Gantry
    - Electric Works
    - ICI

== Adelaide suburban network ==
There are two closed stations on the passenger railway network in the city of Adelaide, South Australia that have not been demolished, both along the Belair line:

- Clapham (closed 28 April 1995)
- Hawthorn (closed 28 April 1995)

=== Demolished stations ===
There are several stations along current railway routes that have been closed and demolished:

Belair line

- Keswick (closed and demolished 2013; replaced by nearby Adelaide Showground)
- Mile End Goods (closed 1994)
- Showground Central (seasonal-use temporary structure, used 2003–2013; replaced by Adelaide Showground)
- Sleeps Hill

Flinders line

- Clovelly Park (closed and demolished 2020; replaced by nearby relocated Tonsley)
- Tonsley (original station closed and demolished 2019; relocated station opened 2020)

Gawler line

- GMH Elizabeth (at the end of a spur starting 1.0 kilometre (0.62 miles) north of Nurlutta)
- Grand Junction (closed 1859)
- Islington Works (closed 2000 and demolished c. 2021)
- Tube Mills

Grange line

- Golf Links (closed 1961)
- Holdens (closed 1992)

Outer Harbor line

- Cheltenham Racecourse siding (closed 1953)
- Cheltenham Racecourse (closed 2009, demolished 2012; replaced with nearby St Clair)
- Largs Jetty (closed 1908; spur at Largs traversing Jetty Road to the Largs Pier Hotel and the jetty)
- Torrens Bridge (opened 1883, closed 1888)
- Yerlo (closed 13 September 1981; replaced by North Haven)

Port Dock line

- Port Dock (original station closed and demolished 1981; rebuilt station opened 2024)

Seaford line

- Keswick (closed and demolished 2013; replaced by nearby Adelaide Showground)
- Mile End Goods (closed 1994)
- Showground Central (temporary structure; used 2003–2013)
- South Brighton (closed 1976)

== Rebuilt ==
These stations previously existed in slightly different locations, and/or at a higher or lower level (for example, originally at ground level then lowered into a cutting), to their modern-day counterparts. They may be considered the closed predecessors of today's stations.

- Christie Downs (November 1981) - on the Seaford line
- Oaklands (10 June 2008 (at-grade) (6 May 2019 (grade separated) - on the Seaford line
- Brighton (25 January 1976) - on the Seaford line
- Hallett Cove (1970s, 1990s and August 2010) - on the Seaford line
- Ovingham (7 November 2022) - on the Gawler line
- Dudley Park (1940s) - on the Gawler line
- Islington (12 June 2022) - on the Gawler line
- Dry Creek (1982, 2022) - on the Gawler line
- Parafield (1982, 2008) - on the Gawler line
- Chidda (1974, 2012) - on the Gawler line
- Salisbury (17 December 1985) - on the Gawler line
- Elizabeth South (April 2012) - on the Gawler line
- Elizabeth (1999, 2012) - on the Gawler line
- Womma (2021, 2022) - on the Gawler line
- Broadmeadows (2011) - on the Gawler line
- Smithfield (2001) - on the Gawler line
- Munno Para (September 2011) - on the Gawler line
- Tambelin (1986, 2021-2022) - on the Gawler line
- Gawler (1872, 2012) - on the Gawler line
- Gawler Oval (2006) - on the Gawler line
- Bowden (rebuilt in a lowered cutting in 2018) - on the Outer Harbor line
- Croydon (2018) - on the Outer Harbor line
- Port Adelaide (1971, 2010) - on the Outer Harbor line
- Ethelton (October 2024) - on the Outer Harbor line
- Glanville (1978) - on the Outer Harbor line
- Largs North (1943, 2002) - on the Outer Harbor line
- Taperoo (1955) - on the Outer Harbor line
- Midlunga (17 July 1961) - on the Outer Harbor line
- Osborne (1980s) - on the Outer Harbor line
- Albert Park (2017) - on the Grange line
- Grange, terminus of Grange line (1986)
- Tonsley (29 December 2020) - on the Flinders line
- Millswood (12 October 2014) - on the Belair line
- Unley Park (1980s, 2000s) - on the Belair line
- Lynton (2007) - on the Belair line
- Eden Hills (1990s, 2009) - on the Belair line
- Coromandel (2009) - on the Belair line
- Blackwood (1990s, 2009) - on the Belair line

== See also ==
- List of closed railway stations in South Australia
