= Mile End station =

Mile End station may refer to:

== United Kingdom ==
- Mile End tube station, an underground station in London
- Mile End railway station (London), a disused railway station in London

== Australia ==
- Mile End railway station, Adelaide, South Australia
- Mile End Goods railway station, Adelaide, South Australia
