= GMH Elizabeth railway station =

Former railway line in South Australia

General information
- Location: Kettering Road; Elizabeth South
- Coordinates: 34°44′37″S 138°39′13″E
- Line: Gawler Line
- Distance: 22.5 kilometres (14.0 miles) from Adelaide railway station

History
- Opened: 31 May 1959
- Closed: 1992

Services
Preceding station	TransAdelaide	Following station
Nurlutta towards Adelaide	Gawler line	Terminus
Location

GMH Elizabeth railway station, located on an industrial spur into the General Motors Holden automotive manufacturing site in the northern Adelaide suburb of Elizabeth South, was in use for 33 years between 1959 and 1992. The line into the factory departed from the Gawler line, 1.3 kilometres (0.8 miles) north of Nurlutta station, equidistant between there and Elizabeth South station. The last passenger service occurred in August 1992; subsequently all infrastructure was demolished and most of the track was lifted.

About 500 metres (550 yards) from its starting point at the mainline, the line diverged into eight factory sidings that extended a further 450 metres (490 yards) south. Passenger platforms were of wooden step-down construction.

As an industrial destination, the station was served by railcars at factory shift changes, which usually ran express to nearby Salisbury and on to Adelaide railway station. Freight trains, mainly comprising automotive carriers that transported vehicle bodies to GMH in Melbourne, operated on demand.

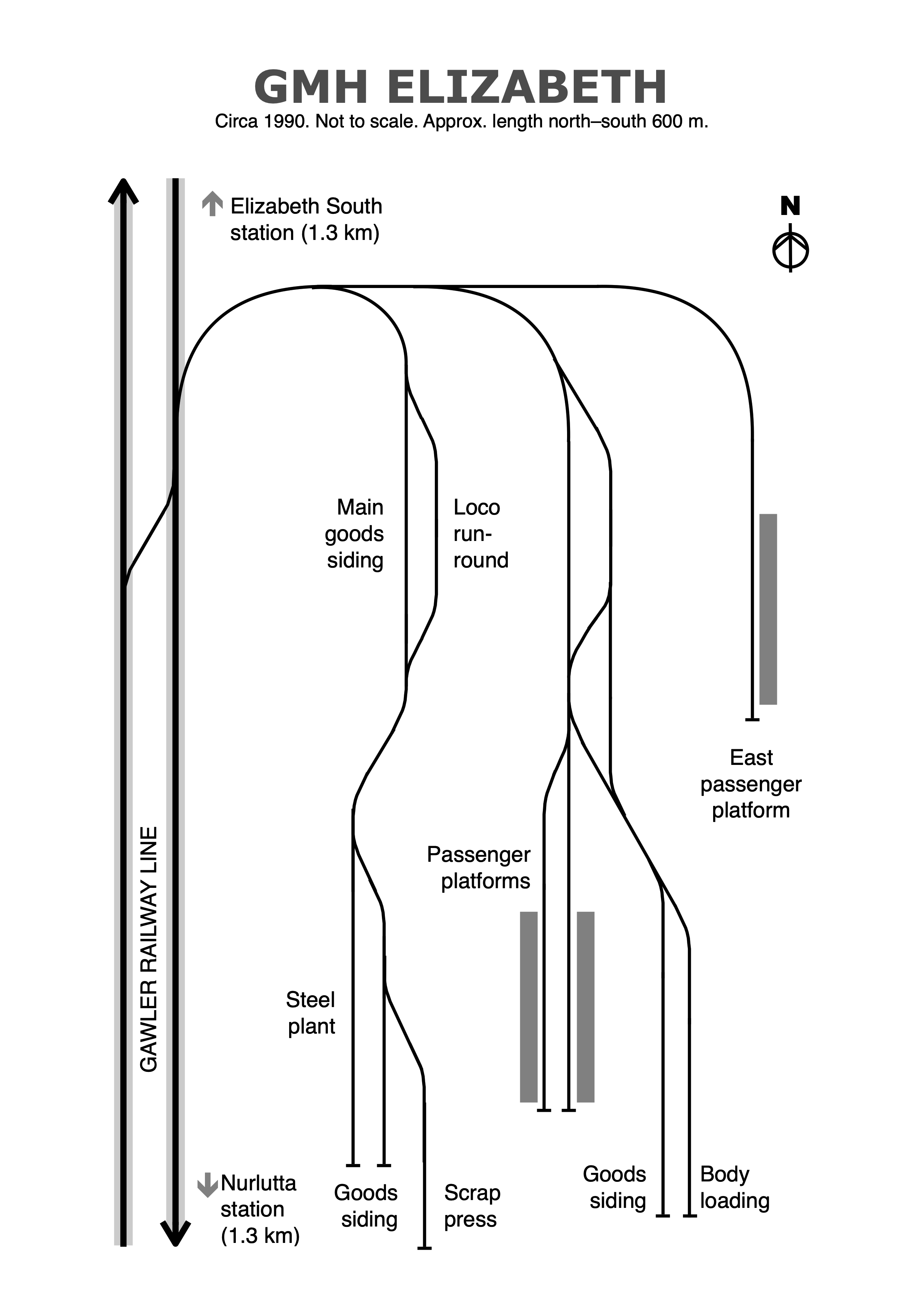

GMH Elizabeth track plan, late 1980s

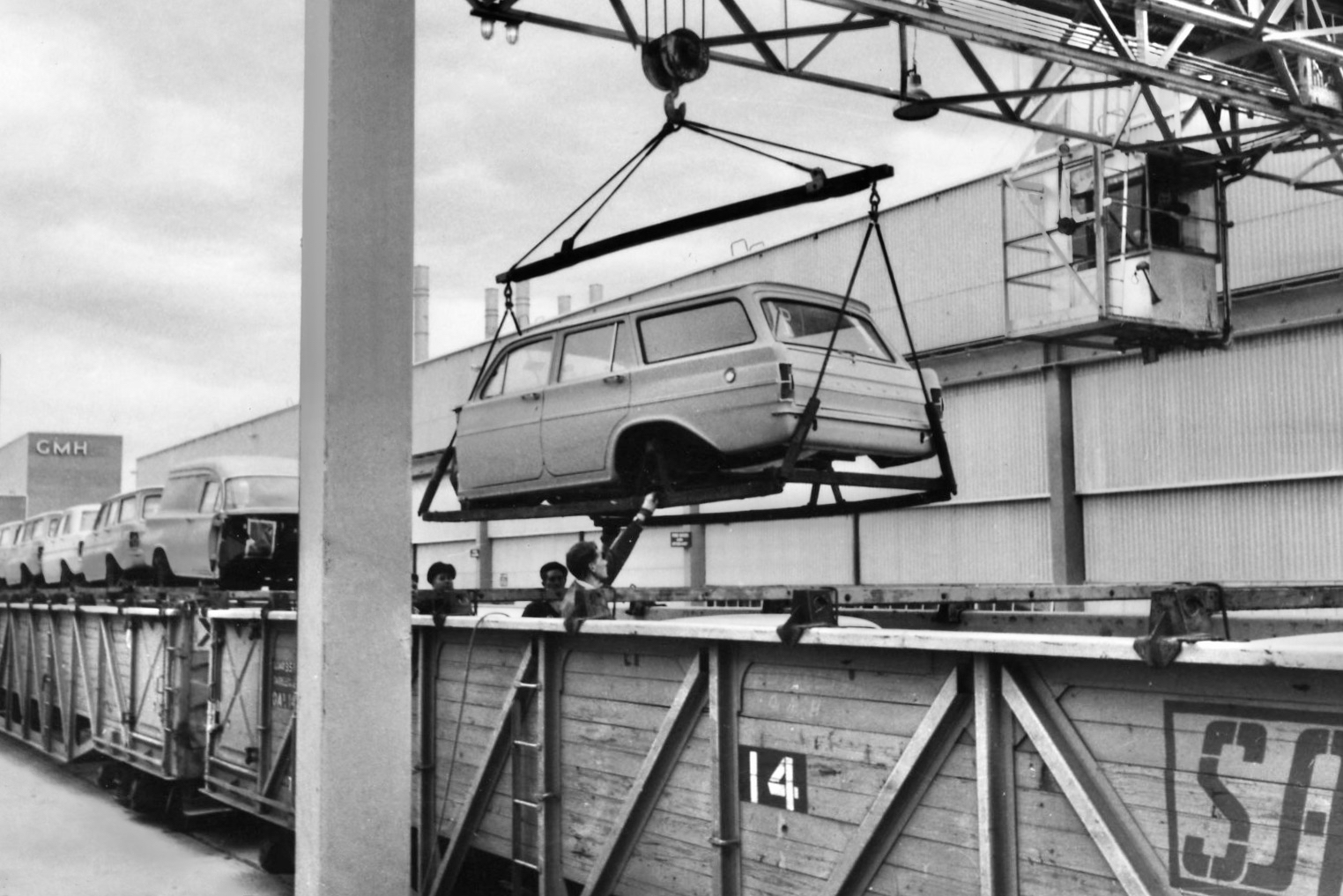

Loading vehicle bodies for further assembly in Melbourne

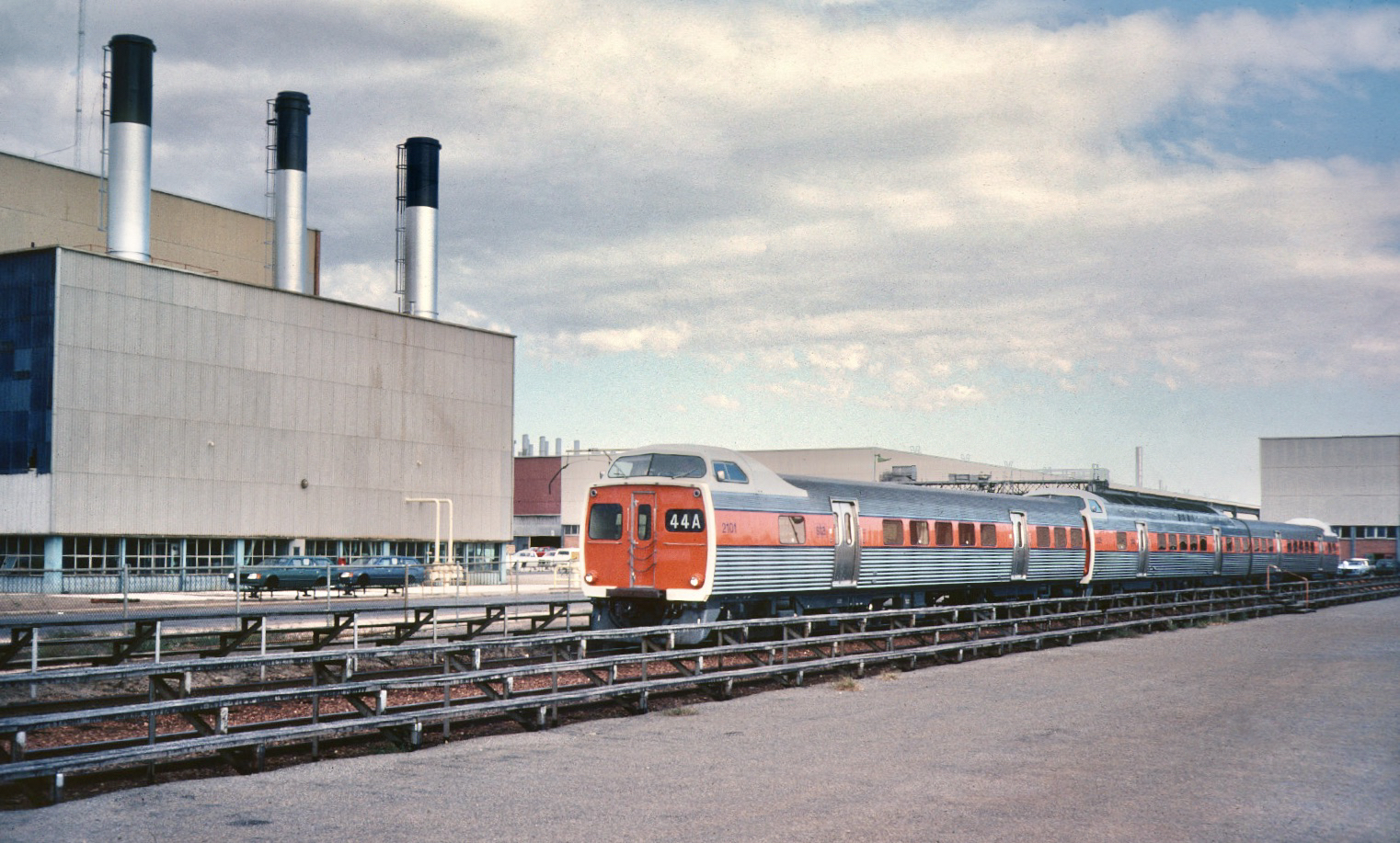

Railcars waiting for shift-change passengers, March 1982
