= Torrens Bridge railway station =

Former railway station in Australia

Coordinates: 34°54′44″S 138°34′56″E

Torrens Bridge railway station was a short-lived railway station on the Outer Harbor line in North Adelaide. The location of the station was east of Bonython Park. It was located about 1.7 kilometres (1.1 mi) from Adelaide station.

The station was opened in 1883 as the result of a petition from a pressure group on behalf of residents of North Adelaide. Facilities consisted of two side platforms, buildings on both platforms and a footbridge between them. As its name suggests, the station was located just west of the railway bridge that crossed the River Torrens. Before the station closed, it was the closest station to Adelaide station, but Mile End is now the closest.

The station was closed in 1888 and demolished shortly after. It was the first railway station to close in South Australia. The buildings and footbridge were relocated to the newly opened Croydon station. No trace remains of where the station was located, but the pedestrian crossing close to where the North and Port Lines part way is close to the location of the station.
