= Adelaide Jubilee International Exhibition =

1887 exhibition in South Australia

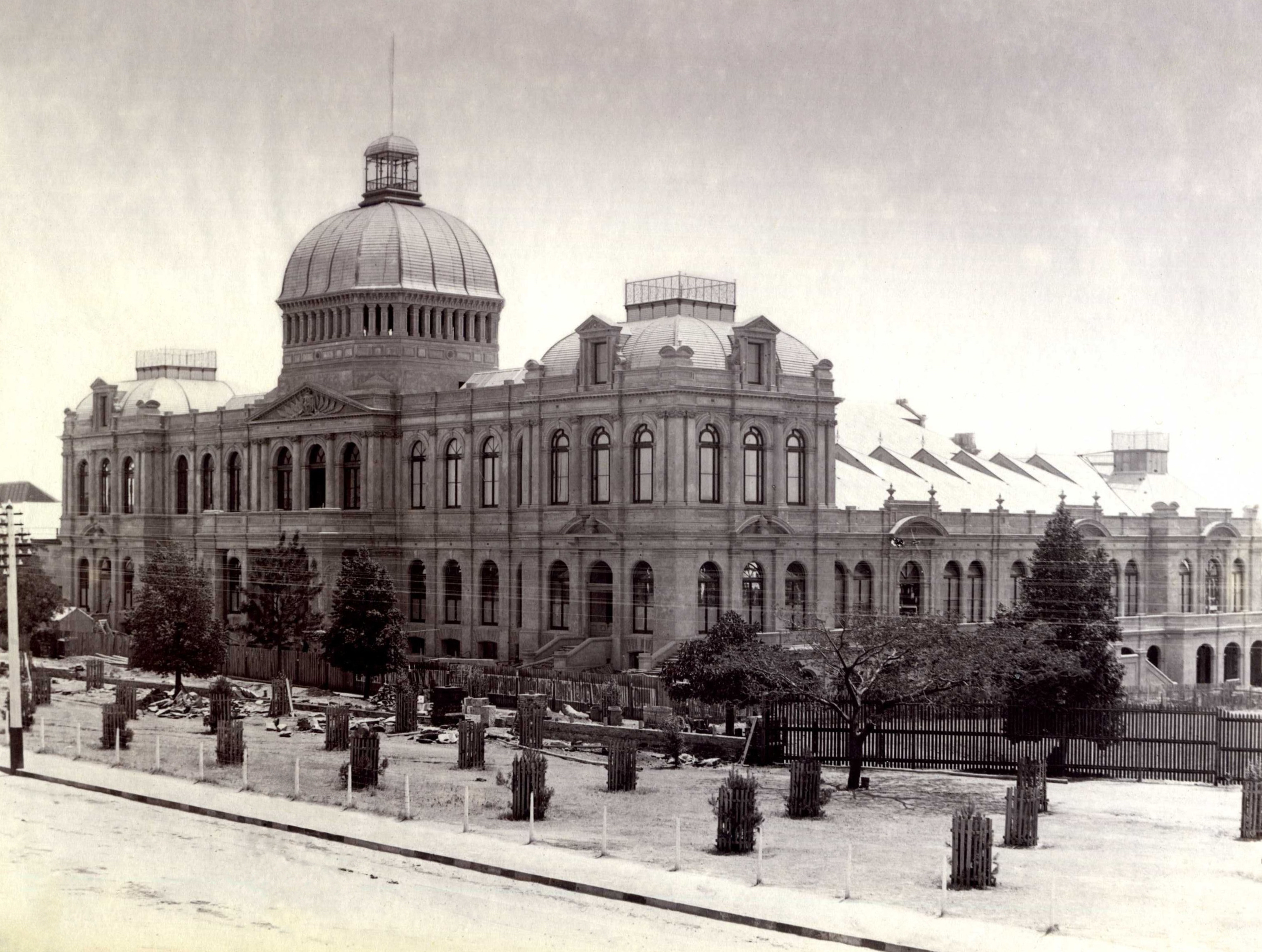

Overview
- BIE-class: Unrecognized exposition
- Name: Adelaide Jubilee International Exhibition
- Building(s): Jubilee Exhibition Building
- Area: 18 acres
- Visitors: 766,880

Participant(s)
- Countries: 26

Location
- Country: Australia
- City: Adelaide, South Australia
- Venue: North Terrace
- Coordinates: 34°55′14″S 138°36′22″E

Timeline
- Opening: 21 June 1887
- Closure: 7 January 1888

The Adelaide International Jubilee Exhibition of 1887 was a celebration of the 50th anniversary of Queen Victoria's accession to the throne on 20 June 1837, held in Adelaide, South Australia, in 1887. It was also a celebration of the 50th anniversary of the Proclamation of South Australia which occurred around six months earlier, on 28 December 1886.

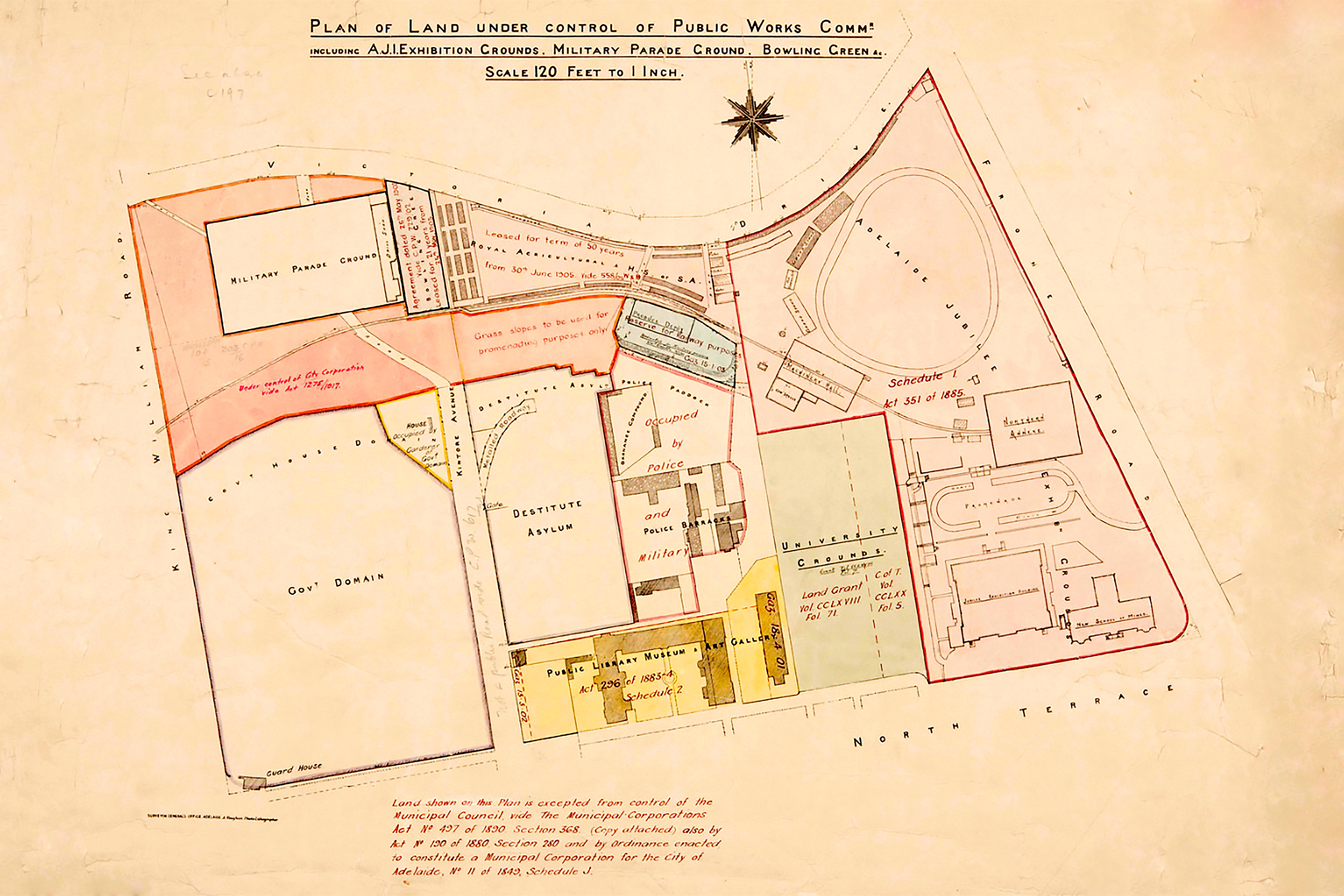
Plan of the Adelaide Jubilee International Exhibition grounds and adjacent areas, about 1905

== Proposal ==
The idea of South Australia hosting an international exhibition as a patriotic gesture was promoted in the early 1880s, culminating in a Bill which was passed by Parliament in 1883. Subsequent opposition to the scheme on the grounds of the expense involved saw the Bill being repealed in 1884, and Sir Edwin T. Smith pushed for a less grandiose celebration, which resulted in the Act of 1885, and the voting of £32,000 for a permanent Exhibition Building, as well as an adjacent temporary building. The cost of running the Exhibition, expected to be met by entrance fees, was underwritten by a handful of wealthy guarantors, including pastoralist Clement Sabine. A railway line was constructed from the Adelaide railway station to the Exhibition Building.

J. F. Conigrave was Secretary, William Alfred Robinson was on the committee; Robert Dalrymple Ross was a promoter. H. C. E. Muecke was Executive Commissioner for Germany; C. L. Meyer (1849–1916) for Austria-Hungary. Sir Herbert Sandford R.A. (1826–1892) visited as British Commissioner, enlisting J. C. Wharton as secretary. John Neild was the popular and hard-working commissioner for New South Wales.

A London Committee was formed under Chairman the Duke of Manchester, while secretary George Levey contributed largely to the Melbourne, London, Philadelphia, New York and Paris press, and wrote various important official reports.

== Opening and closing ceremonies ==
The formal opening ceremony took place on 21 June 1887 and began, after a prayer by Bishop Kennion and a performance of the Exhibition Cantata (George Herbert Cossins / Edward R. G. W. Andrews), with an address by Sir Edwin Smith, the Vice-President of the South Australian Commission, presenting to the President, the Governor Sir William Robinson with a golden master key to the Building, all the locks having been donated by Chubb & Co. This part of the formalities over, the orchestra and chorus under Professor Joshua Ives struck up The Song of Australia.

At the closing ceremony on 7 January 1888, the Jubilee Cantata (or Victoria Cantata) was performed. Written (words and music) by Carl Puttmann, it opened with variations on the Song of Australia and concluded with a fugue on God Save the Queen. Total attendance at the Exhibition was announced as 766,880, of which cash admissions were 378,558; season ticketholders 372,818; schools 12,034; and free 3,470.

== Awards ==
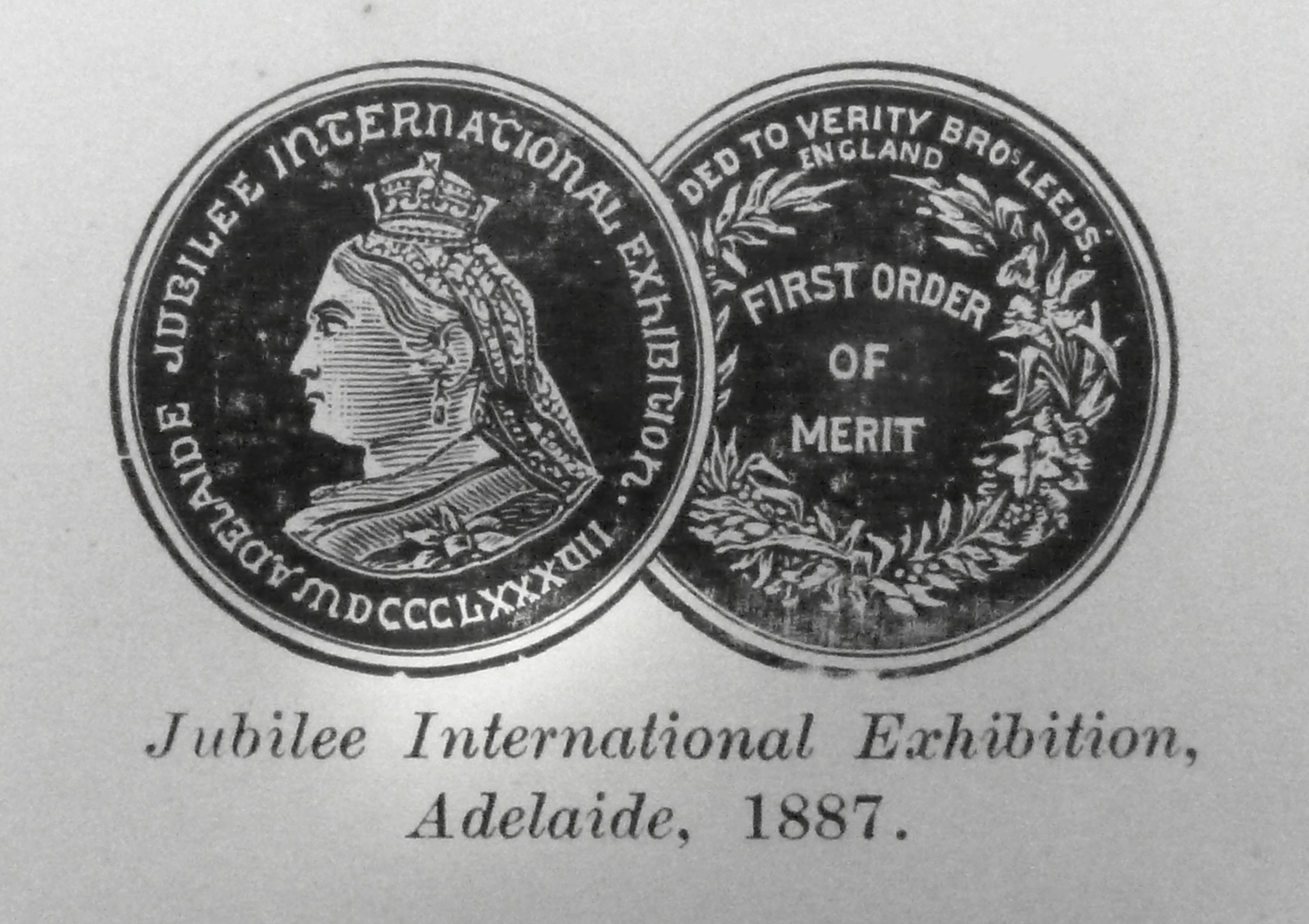
First Order of Merit Medal

Thirty-four juries, each with between 4 and 12 jurors, (Note: The total number of jurors was 192, of whom 100 were from South Australia; the remainder were from New South Wales and Victoria.) made 3,426 awards. Among the award winners was the British ironmongery manufacturer and retailer Verity Brothers of Leeds, who won a First Order of Merit medal.

Awards by countries and Australian states
	1st	2nd	3rd	Tot
Austria-Hungary	45	32	17	94
Belgium	71	39	46	156
British North Borneo	1			1
Denmark	1			1
France	10	7	2	19
Germany	71	32	11	114
Holland	1	1		2
Italy	2	1		3
New South Wales	189	130	75	394
Victoria	268	151	89	508
South Australia	457	316	225	998
Seychelles Islands	4			4
Sweden	3	1		4
Switzerland	1			1
United States of America	56	21	10	87
United Kingdom of Great Britain and Ireland	663	227	98	988
Algiers	1			1
Canada	3	7		10
Fiji	4	1		5
India	2	1		3
Johore	2	2		4
Manila	1			1
New Zealand	6	4		10
Tasmania	11	2		13
TOTAL	1,875	975	576	3,426

== Entertainments ==
Dozens of concerts were given during the course of the Exhibition, including the following:

- W. R. Pybus gave an organ recital on 9 September, and a military display was held on the same day.
- An organ recital was given by W. R. Knox on the afternoon of Saturday 17 September, and a "grand popular concert" was organised by Bessie Royal for the evening, Mr Pybus serving as accompanist. and another concert was held on 20 September
- The Model Band gave a performance on the afternoon of 24 September, and T. H. Jones gave an organ recital in the evening.
- Coward's Premier Band gave a concert on 29 September.
- A Grand International Band Competition was held on 1 October.
- W. R. Pybus gave another organ recital on 28 October, and the Militia Band performed on 29 October.
- A concert was given on 19 November, with singers H. G. Nash and Bessie Royal, accompanied by W. R. Pybus.
- On 24 November a "Grand instrumental concert with vocal intermezzo" was given by Professor Ives, Hermann Reimann and Miss Hawkins, vocalist.

== Agricultural show ==
The Royal Agricultural and Horticultural Society ran their Spring Show concurrently with the Jubilee Exhibition from 14 to 17 September, but at the "Old Exhibition Grounds" on the other side of Frome Road. The Show had been extended from two to four days on account of the great interest shown, particularly in the display of sheep, which was of a very high standard.

=== Prizes ===
A wide range of awards included:

- photographer: Friedrich C. Krichauff
- painter: John Reinhard Weguelin
- red wine: Thomas Hardy (after Paul de Castella of Yarra Flats was disqualified on technical grounds)
- billiard tables: B. Hulbert of Sydney, Alcock & Co. of Melbourne and P. Gay of Adelaide
- tinned jam: the Wirrilda Jam factory, Stirling East
- various classes of heating and cooking stoves: Thos. Fletcher & Co., S. Flavel, and G. W. Grove, all of Leamington; McDowell, Steven & Co., and Smith & Wellstood, both of Scotland; and Fischer Heating and Cooking Apparatus Company of Cincinnati
- musical instruments: the Besson Company of Great Britain for brass instruments; Estey Organ Company of Vermont for reed organs; and Fincham & Hobday of Adelaide for a pipe organ.

== Legacy ==
Costs of running the Exhibition, not counting capital works, were more than covered by gate takings and other receipts, a tribute to the Committee's organisation, but also to the patriotic fervour of the times.

John Neild began to encounter difficulties in his political career towards the end of the 1880s; criticism of his oversight of the establishment of the Exhibition led to investigation by a Legislative Assembly select committee, but he was exonerated.

The area north of the Exhibition Railway Station was cleared and formed into a sports oval, bordered by a banked cycle racing track, and christened the Jubilee Oval. It was used, in conjunction with the Jubilee Exhibition Building, for Royal Agricultural and Horticultural Society Autumn Show in 1895, and all Shows until the Spring Show at the Wayville showgrounds in September 1925.
