= Westside Bikeway =

- Length: 9 kilometres (5.6 mi)
- Location: Adelaide, South Australia
- Trailheads: Mile End railway station Camden Oval
- Use: Walking, cycling
- Highest point: 30 metres (98 ft) at Mile End
- Lowest point: Glenelg
- Grade: Flat
- Difficulty: Easy
- Sights: Former Plympton railway platform
- Surface: Asphalt
- Right of way: Holdfast Bay railway line

The Westside Bikeway is a shared walking and cycling route through the western suburbs of Adelaide following the former Holdfast Bay railway line. It provides a connection from Glenelg to the various trails and paths in the Adelaide Parklands.

== Route ==
The bikeway starts near Mile End railway station and follows adjacent to James Congdon Drive to South Road. The remainder of the trail is in the railway easement with minor roads nearby. It provides traffic lights where it crosses main roads. One of the old railway platforms is still visible at Plympton.

West of Morphett Road, the path goes round the edge of an oval and meets Anzac Highway, where it intersects the Sturt River trail. There are quiet street connections to Glenelg North via the Sturt River path or south onto the Mike Turtur Bikeway and into Glenelg.

== See also ==
- List of rail trails
