= Glenelg railway station =

Former railway station in South Australia, Australia

Glenelg
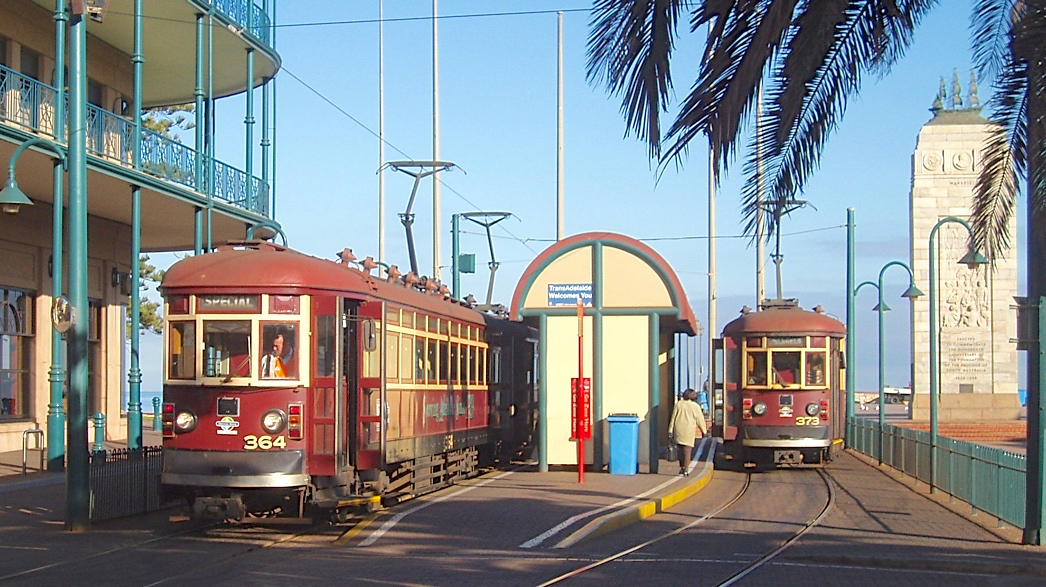
- H-class trams at Moseley Square terminus, Glenelg (8 May 2006)

General information
- Location: Sussex Street, Glenelg, South Australia
- Coordinates: 34.97941502555941°S 138.51413592905953°E
- Operator: South Australian Railways
- Lines: Glenelg line Holdfast Bay line
- Distance: 11.9 kilometres from Adelaide
- Platforms: 2
- Tracks: 2

Construction
- Structure type: Ground

Other information
- Status: Closed to passengers, converted into a police station

History
- Opened: 2 August 1873
- Closed: December 1929
- Rebuilt: 1914
Location

Glenelg railway station was the terminus of the Glenelg railway line and the Holdfast Bay railway line. It was located in the seaside suburb of Glenelg, South Australia.

== History ==
=== Opening ===
Glenelg railway station opened on 4 August 1873 with the opening of the railway line between Angas Street corner of King William Street and Glenelg. It became a cross station when another line opened from Adelaide. Both lines were built by different private companies and competed with each other. The Glenelg line from South Terrace was built by the Adelaide, Glenelg & Suburban Railway Company and the line from Adelaide station was built by the Holdfast Bay Railway Company, thus the railway was called the Holfast Bay railway line. On 12 November 1881, the two companies merged and formed the Glenelg Railway Company Limited. Both lines continued to run services. Business assets such as maintenance facilities were shared to reduce costs. Rolling stock was transferred between the two lines via a new connecting line along Brighton Road. The company and lines were acquired by South Australian Railways in December 1899. A new Glenelg railway station was erected in 1914 as the terminus of the Glenelg lines consisting of a wood and iron structure, ticket offices, luggage offices and a waiting place. In 1917, a train caught fire at the station.

=== Closure and present day ===
In 1924, William A. Webb, the railways commissioner, proposed that the two Glenelg railways be given to the Municipal Tramways Trust (MTT) and be converted from steam railways into electric tramways. Steam trains ceased on the Glenelg line and the line was closed to be converted into a tramway. line was closed to be rebuilt as a double track standard gauge, electrified at 600 V dc and converted to tramway operation. The Goodwood Overpass was constructed at this time, separating the new tram tracks from the conventional railway. The line was reopened on 14 December 1929 with the city terminus reverting to Victoria Square. The Holdfast Bay line closed on 15 December 1929 for conversion but this was not undertaken due to the onset of the Great Depression. The station was converted into a police station and the tram terminus was relocated at Moseley Square.
