= Jubilee Exhibition Building =

Former building in Adelaide, South Australia

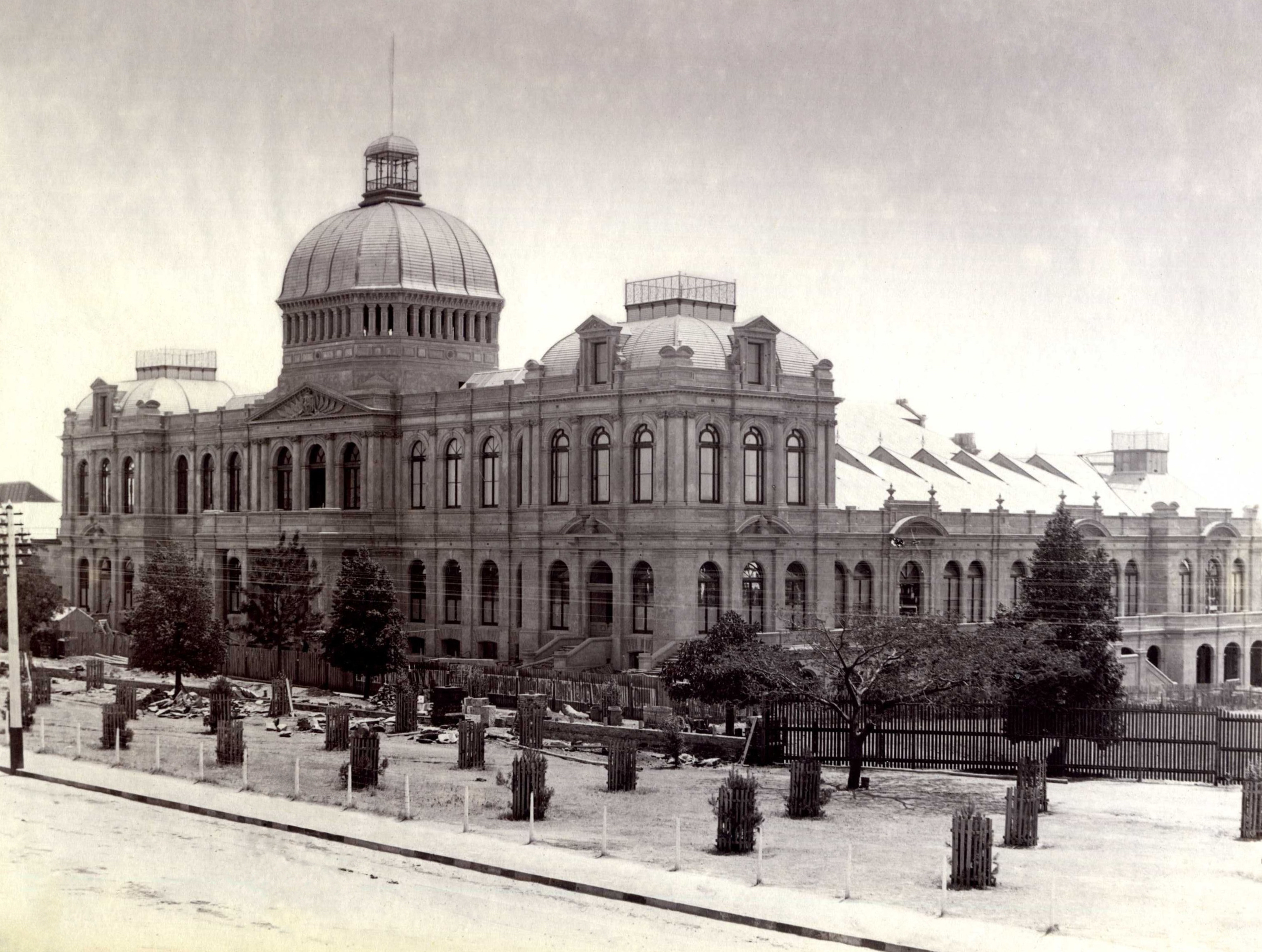
- Interactive map of the Jubilee Exhibition Building area

General information
- Status: Demolished
- Location: North Terrace, Adelaide, Australia
- Coordinates: 34°55′14″S 138°36′22″E
- Construction started: 1885
- Completed: 1887
- Opened: 20 June 1887
- Demolished: 1962
- Cost: £20,217 (1887)

The Jubilee Exhibition Building in Adelaide, South Australia, was built to celebrate the 50th anniversary of Queen Victoria's accession to the throne on 20 June 1837. The jubilees of her Coronation on 28 June 1838, and of the Proclamation of South Australia on 28 December 1836, were also invoked on occasion.

The building, increasingly referred to as the Exhibition Building, was located opposite the corner of North Terrace and Pulteney Street. on what is now the University of Adelaide's North Terrace campus, between Bonython Hall and the old School of Mines building (now University of South Australia's City East campus) on the Frome Road corner. It was opened on 20 June 1887 and was used until the mid 1920s. In 1929 the land and building were transferred to the University, and the building was demolished in 1962 to make way for the Napier building. There were two fountains in front of the building. One is now located in front of the Rundle Mall entrance to the Adelaide Arcade, the other in the Creswell Gardens.

== Planning ==
The idea of South Australia hosting an international exhibition as a patriotic gesture was promoted in the early 1880s, culminating in a Bill which was passed by Parliament in 1883. Subsequent opposition to the scheme on the grounds of the expense involved saw the Bill being repealed in 1884, and Sir Edwin T. Smith pushed for a less grandiose celebration, which resulted in the Act of 1885, and the voting of £32,000 for a permanent Exhibition Building, which after the Jubilee would become the home of the South Australian Institute.

As originally conceived by Government Architect E. J. Woods, the new building was to have a dome 112 feet (34 m) wide, an art gallery, 46 by 252 feet (14 by 77 m), a court 120 by 43 feet (37 by 13 m) with a gallery round it of 10 feet (3.0 m) width. A basement below this section 10 feet (3.0 m) high, three open courts for lighting and ventilation, each 120 by 66 feet (37 by 20 m) by 40 feet (12 m) high. Height of the dome 80 feet (24 m), 127 feet (39 m) from the floor to the crown of the inner dome, and 192 feet (59 m) from the floor line to the apex of the dome externally.

== Design and construction ==
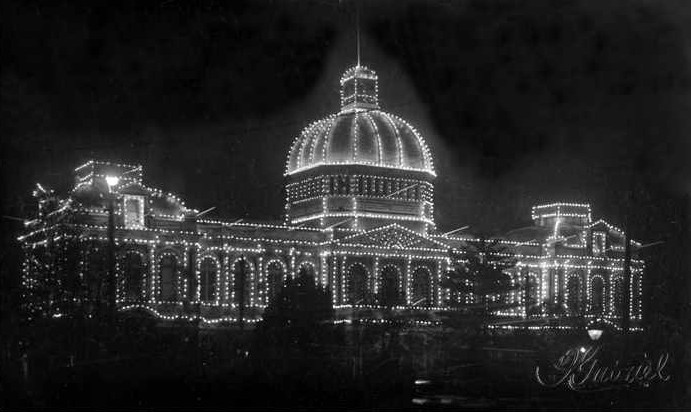
The Jubilee Exhibition Building at night in 1920.

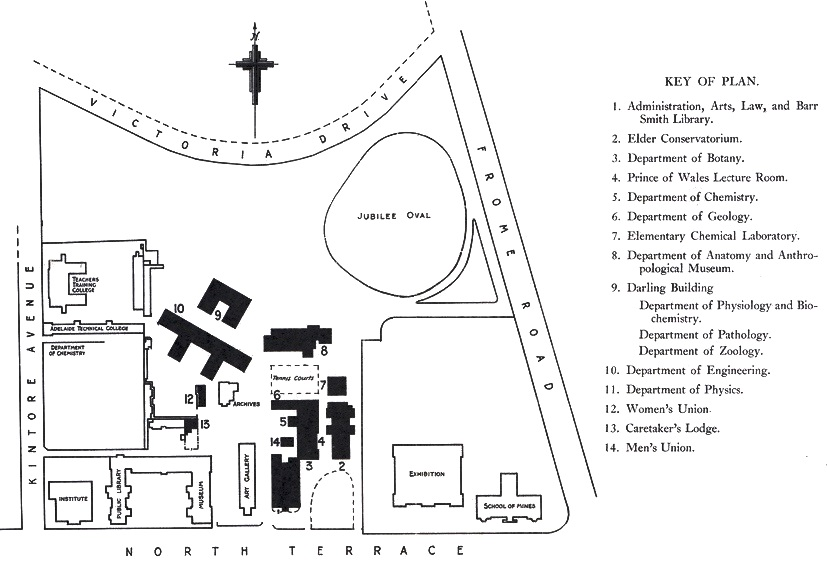
North Terrace institutions in 1926. Exhibition Building is second from right.

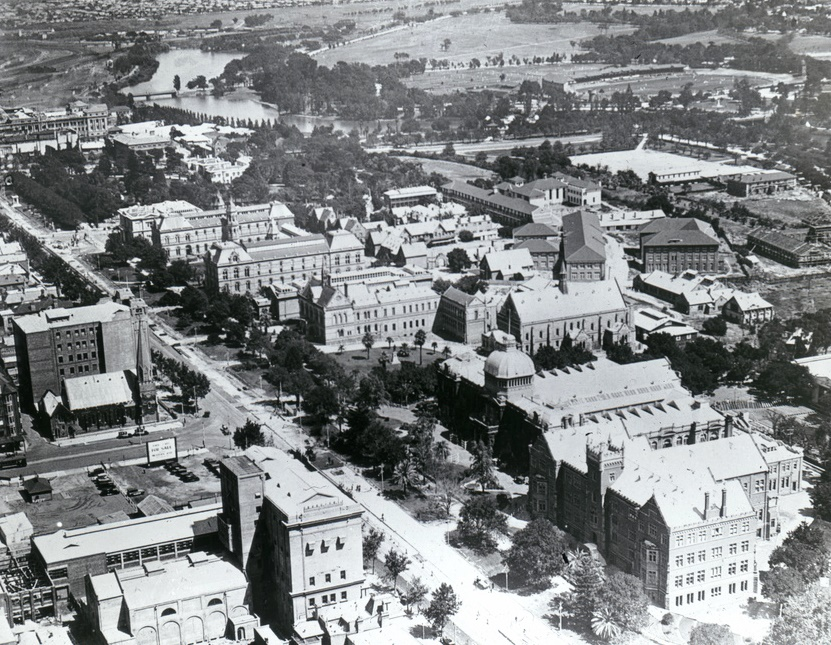
North Terrace, Adelaide 1930

The architects chosen were Withall & Wells, and W. Rogers the builder. The corner-stone was laid on 21 June 1886. Interest from exhibitors in the lead-up to the Jubilee meant that the building had to be extended during the construction process, but the building was completed, and filled with manufactures and produce from around the globe, within the year, well in time for the opening of the Festival on 21 June 1887. A railway line connecting the Adelaide railway station to the grounds behind the Exhibition Building passed under King William Road and ran between the Torrens Parade Ground and Government House.

== Queen Victoria’s Jubilee ==
During the 1887 Jubilee 789,672 visitors passed through the exhibition. The building housed 2,200 exhibitions (valued at approximately £500,000) from 26 different countries. The Adelaide Jubilee International Exhibition was one of few major exhibitions in Australia where all the costs, totalling £66,000, were covered.

== Royal Adelaide Show ==
The Jubilee Exhibition Building and Jubilee Oval was the home of the Royal Adelaide Show from 1895 to 1925.

== Other uses ==
The building and grounds have been used for a variety of events and purposes, including:

- In November 1889 the whole of the basement (one third of the building's floor area) was handed over to the South Australian School of Mines and Industries to accommodate the rising demand for quality vocational training. Though timely, this expedient was less than satisfactory, and not solved until 1903, when the purpose-built school was opened on the Frome Road corner.
- From 1910 to 1916 the Education Department's Adelaide School of Art, conducted by H. P. Gill, was conducted in the Exhibition Building, though under sufferance, as there was no heating in winter.
- On Saturday 2 December 1911, Wondergraph opened its new "Picture Pavilion" opposite the Exhibition Building. This was a seated outdoor picture theatre which showed silent films. The venue continued to operate for several years until at least 1919, lending itself to other uses as well.
- In February 1919 at the outbreak of the Spanish flu pandemic the Exhibition Building became the Exhibition Isolation Hospital. It was heavily criticised by medical staff and was no longer needed once isolation wards had been opened at the nearby Adelaide Hospital, and by late November 1919 when the last admission to the Exhibition hospital took place, 588 patients had been admitted, of whom 68 died from the disease.
- In November 1934, S.A. Theatres opened Adelaide's first outdoor talkie theatre in the Exhibition Grounds, known as the Chinese Gardens owing to the Chinese-themed decor. The last recorded show appears to have taken place in April 1938.
- In 1949 the Motor Vehicles Department, with its staff of 100 and records relating to 143,000 vehicles and 147,000 licensed drivers, as well as archived files, moved to the Exhibition Building from the state government offices on Victoria Square. By 1962, just before demolition, the public offices of this department were located in the Railways building.

== Demolition ==
The building was demolished in 1962, making way for the Napier Building, part of the University of Adelaide.

== See also ==
- List of destroyed heritage
