= Mile End, South Australia =

Mile End
- Suburb
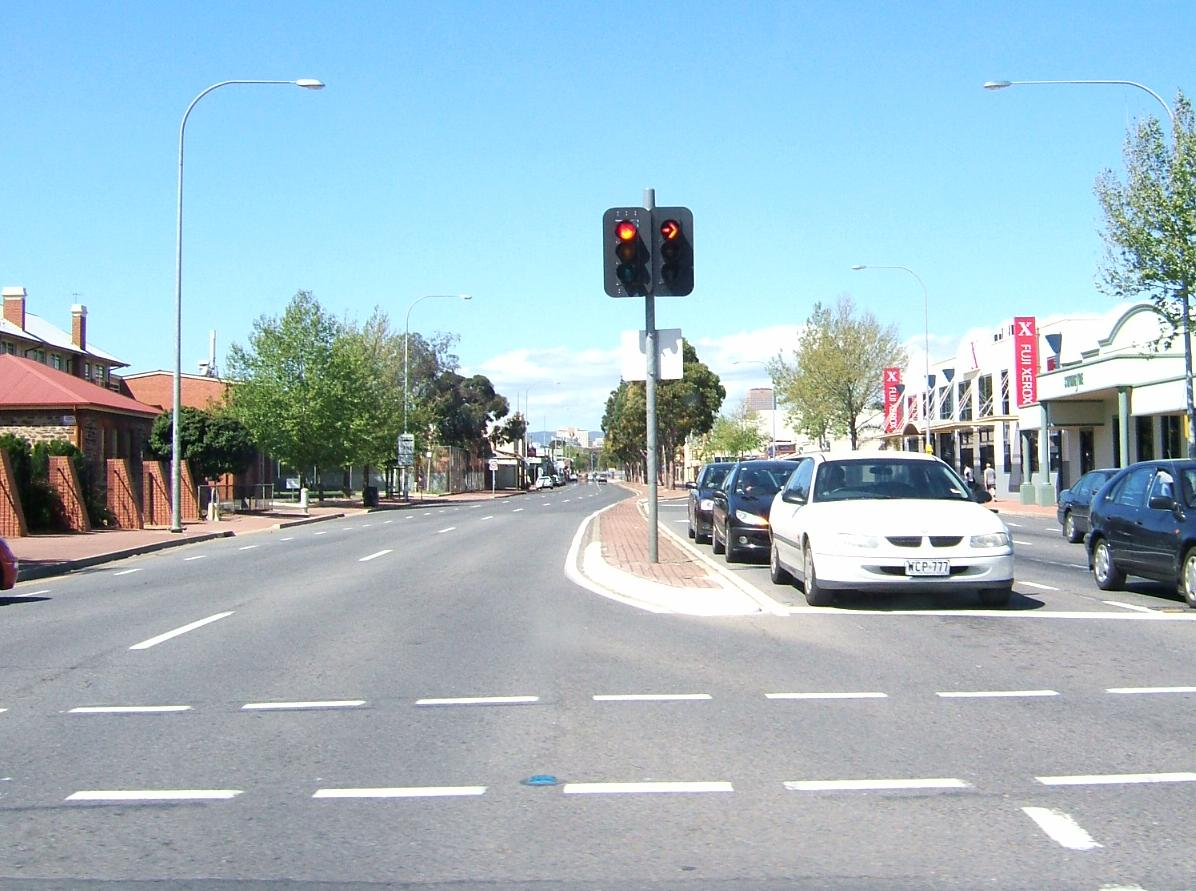
- Henley Beach Road, looking east into the city

- Country: Australia
- State: South Australia
- City: Adelaide
- LGA: City of West Torrens
- Location: 2 km (1.2 mi) W of Adelaide
- Established: 1860

Government
  - State electorate: West Torrens
  - Federal division: Adelaide

Area
  - Total: 1.81 km^{2} (0.70 sq mi)

Population
  - Total: 4,536 (SAL 2021)
- Postcode: 5031
Suburbs around Mile End
Torrensville	Thebarton	Park Lands
Torrensville	Mile End	Park Lands
Cowandilla	Hilton, Mile End South, Keswick Terminal	Park Lands

Mile End is an inner western suburb of Adelaide, located in the City of West Torrens, around 2 kilometres (1.2 mi) from the Adelaide city centre. It has a census area population of 4,413 people (2011). Much of the suburb is residential, but there are small commercial areas along Henley Beach Road and South Road.

== History ==
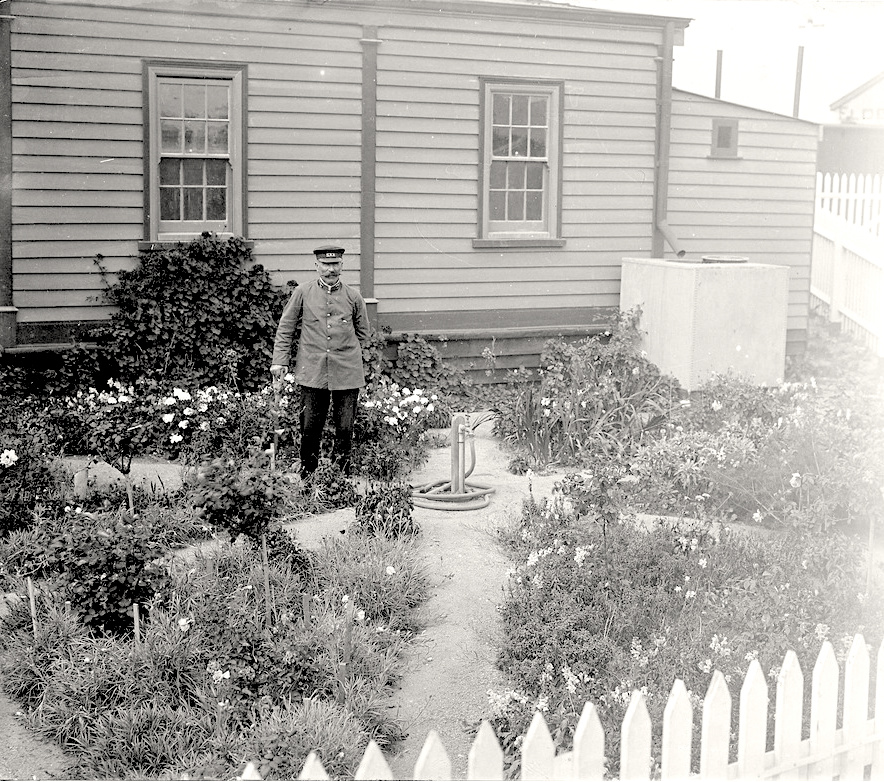
A South Australian Railways employee, possibly a station master, photographed standing in the garden of his weatherboard cottage at Mile End, circa 1920.

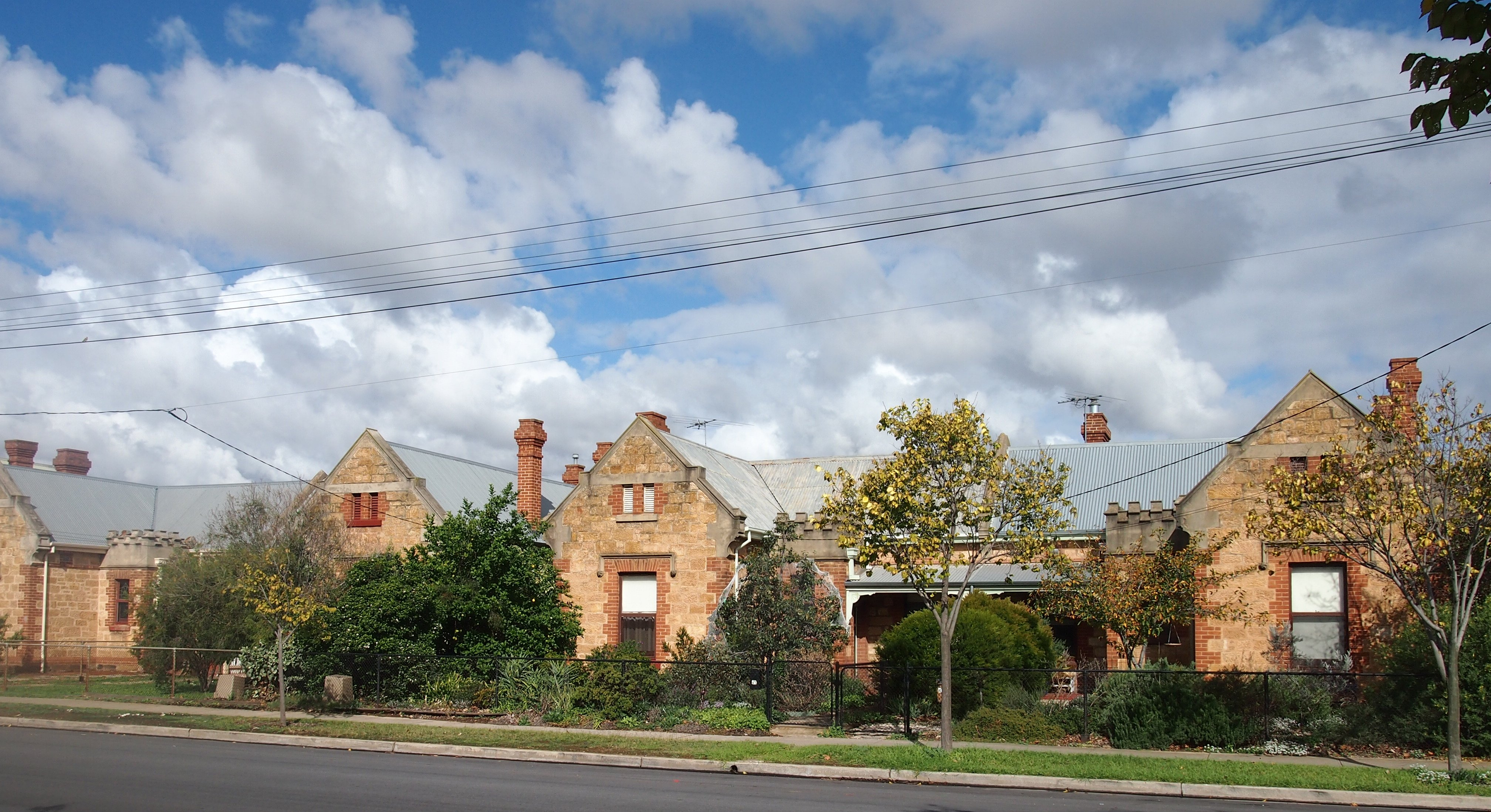
Cottages built in 1901-2 by Adelaide Workmen's Homes Inc., on the south side of Rose Street

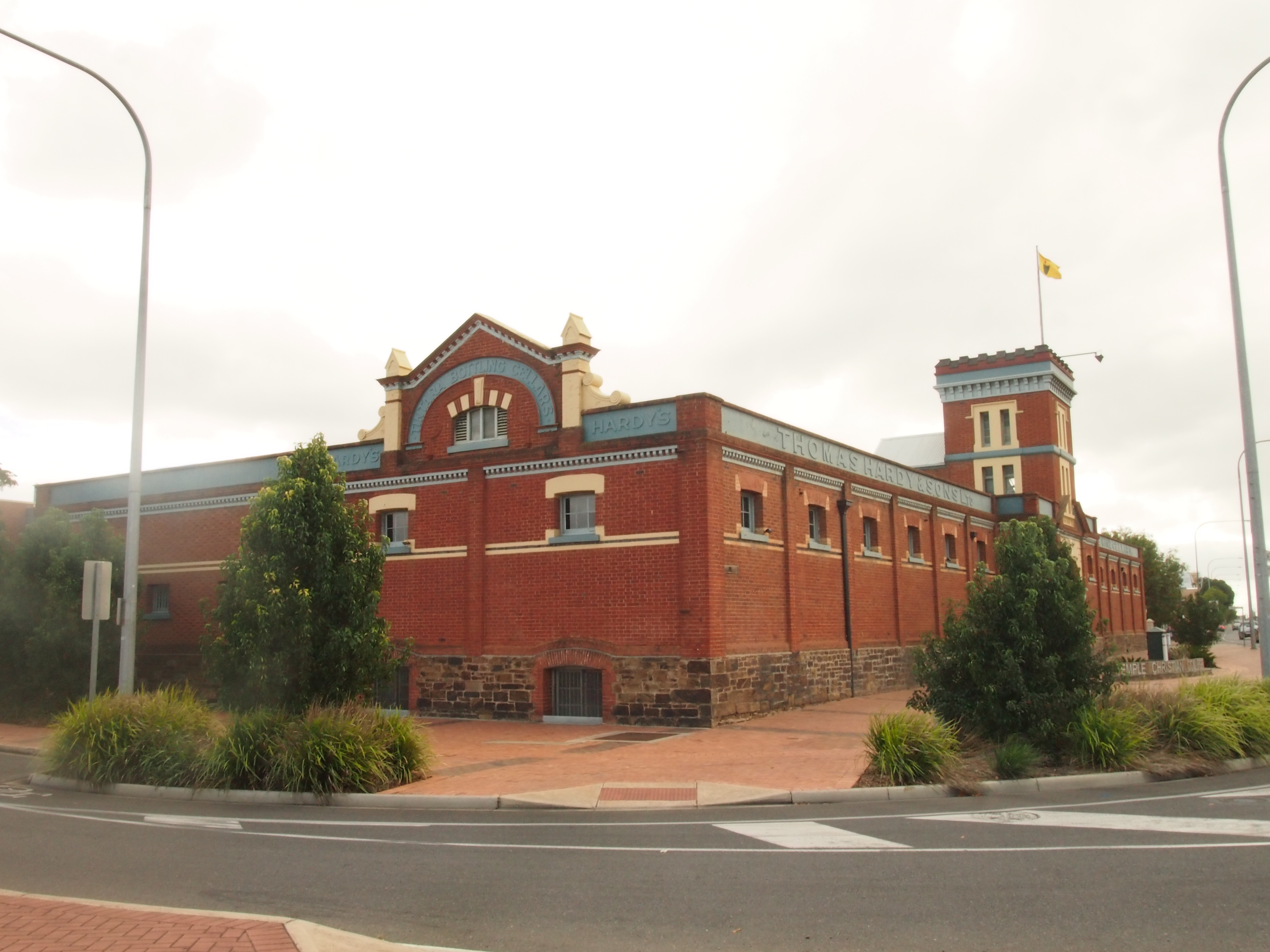
Former Thomas Hardy & Sons Ltd Wine Cellars, built in 1893 and since 1984 the Mile End campus of Temple Christian College.

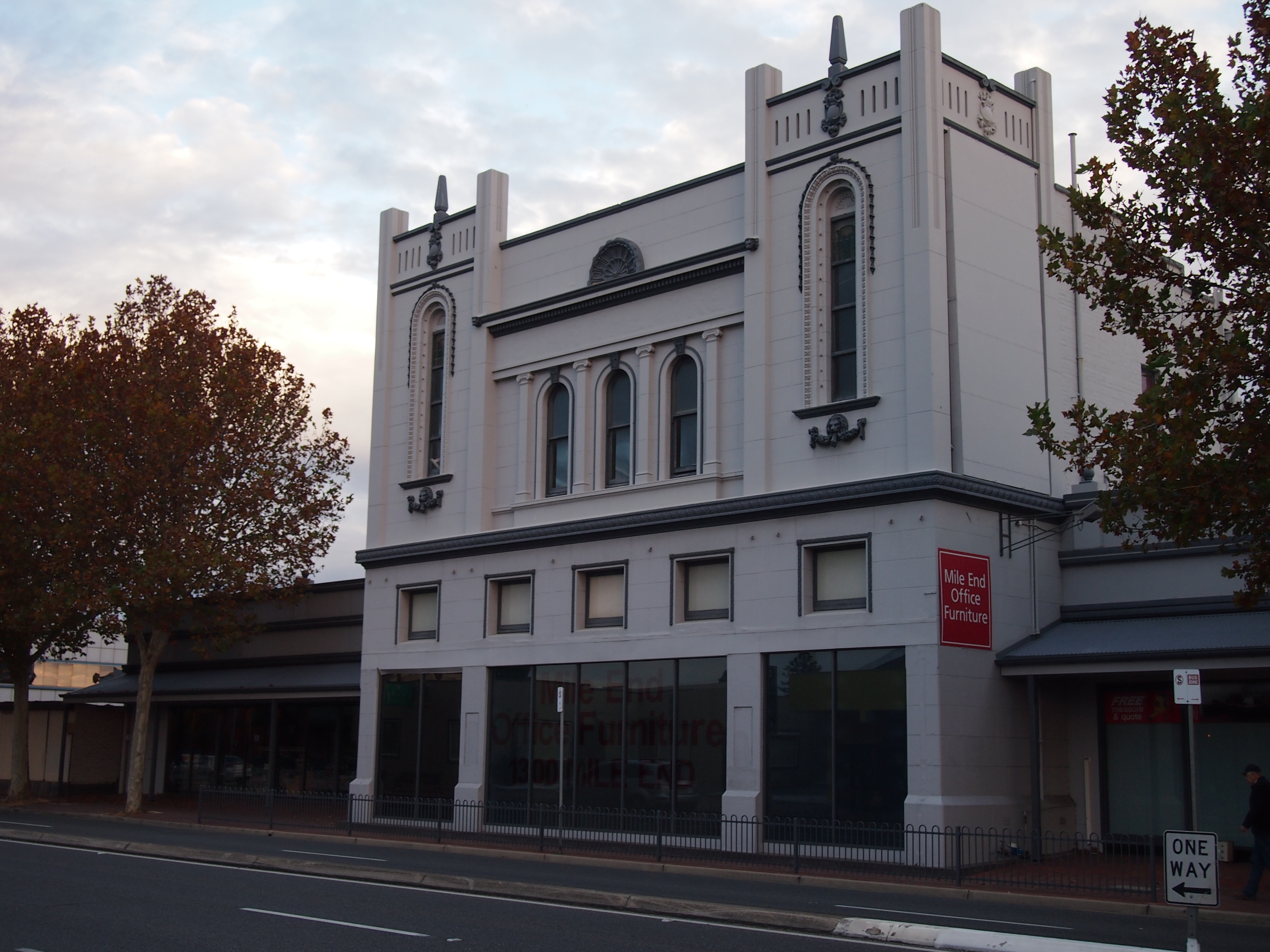
The former Star Theatre on Henley Beach Road, built in 1915-6 as one of the first cinemas in Adelaide, now part of an office furniture retail store

Mile End was originally established in 1860 as The Town of Mile End by the South Australian Company. It was so named because the township was approximately one mile (1.6 km) from the centre of Adelaide. It was also named after Mile End in East London, England, whose name has a similar meaning. It was part of the then largely rural District of West Torrens until 1883, when the residents of the more urban suburbs of Thebarton, Mile End and Torrensville successfully petitioned to become the Corporation of the Town of Thebarton. In 1997 the Town of Thebarton re-amalgamated with the City of West Torrens.

E. M. Bagot and Gabriel Bennett had a large holding of grazing land south of Henley Beach Road, part of which (the "Thebarton Racecourse" or colloquially the "Butchers' Course") was used from 1859 to 1869 by a group of "sporting gentlemen", later to become the South Australian Jockey Club, to hold their race meetings. Thebarton Racecourse's legacy is carried by street names running through the area where the racetrack was once located, such as Falcon Street, Ebor Street and Cowra Street, all of which are named after some of the famed race horses of the day.

Mile End railway station, built in 1898, is also one mile from the Adelaide railway station.

=== Housing ===
At a time when much working-class housing was sub-standard, on his death in 1897 the wealthy philanthropist Thomas Elder left a bequest of £25,000 expressly to provide housing, 'libraries, schools, infant nurseries, laundries, baths and washhouses and for any other purpose tending in the opinion of the trustees to the health and moral welfare of working men and working women'. The bequest resulted in the formation of Adelaide Workmen's Homes Inc, and the trustees engaged the architects Edward Davies and Charles Walter Rutt to design a model estate of low-cost rental housing. in Rose Street, Mile End, which was built in 1901–2. This consisted of two rows of semi-detached cottages facing each other across the street, of red brick with dressed stone façades, and featuring crenellated parapets above the entrance porches. They are collectively listed among the 120 nationally significant 20th-century buildings in South Australia.

=== Railway yards ===
The Mile End Goods Yard and engine sheds opened in 1912, and the Gaol Loop was built to allow freight trains to access them, bypassing Adelaide railway station. This, along with the relocation of livestock markets and abattoirs to Pooraka (still countryside at the time), allowed the Adelaide station yards to concentrate on passenger and parcels traffic.
(See also Adelaide railway station#Early 20th century.)

The Mile End Goods Yard remained an important railway complex until the 1980s. Some original railway workers' cottages still exist in Mile End. However, during the 1980s, rail transport declined considerably in Australia and the importance of the Mile End Goods Yard declined with it. The Mile End Goods railway station, a station on the commuter line, was closed and demolished in 1994. Prior to its closure it serviced only a few trains in the morning and afternoon, at shift start and end time.

The Mile End Railway Museum was also located here until 1988, when the new Port Dock Railway Museum (National Railway Museum) opened in Port Adelaide as part of the bicentennial celebrations.

=== Heritage listings ===
Mile End contains a number of heritage-listed sites, including:

- Bagot Avenue: Council Boundary Marker, Mile End
- 1A Falcon Avenue: St James' Anglican Church School
- 2-4 Henley Beach Road: Thomas Hardy & Sons Wine Cellars
- 94 Henley Beach Road: Savings Bank of South Australia Building
- 36-50A & 39-45A Rose Street: Adelaide Workmen's Homes
- 32-56 Sir Donald Bradman Drive: Adelaide Electric Supply Co Ltd Complex

== Demographics ==
According to the 2006 Census, the population of the Mile End census area was 3,918 people. Approximately 50.1% of the population were female, 62.5% were Australian born, 6.3% were born in Greece, over 81.3% of residents were Australian citizens and only 1.7% were native-born indigenous people. Mile End has an educated population with over 40.8% of the population holding a degree, diploma or vocational qualification. This level of education attainment is reflected in the suburb's employment patterns: the most popular industries for employment were Health Care (11.9%), Retail Trades (11.6%) and Education (9.6%), while the unemployment rate was approx. 5.6%. The median weekly household income was A$918 or more per week, compared with $924 in Adelaide overall. 21.9% of the population identified themselves as Catholic, while a slightly higher 24.5% identified with no religion at all.

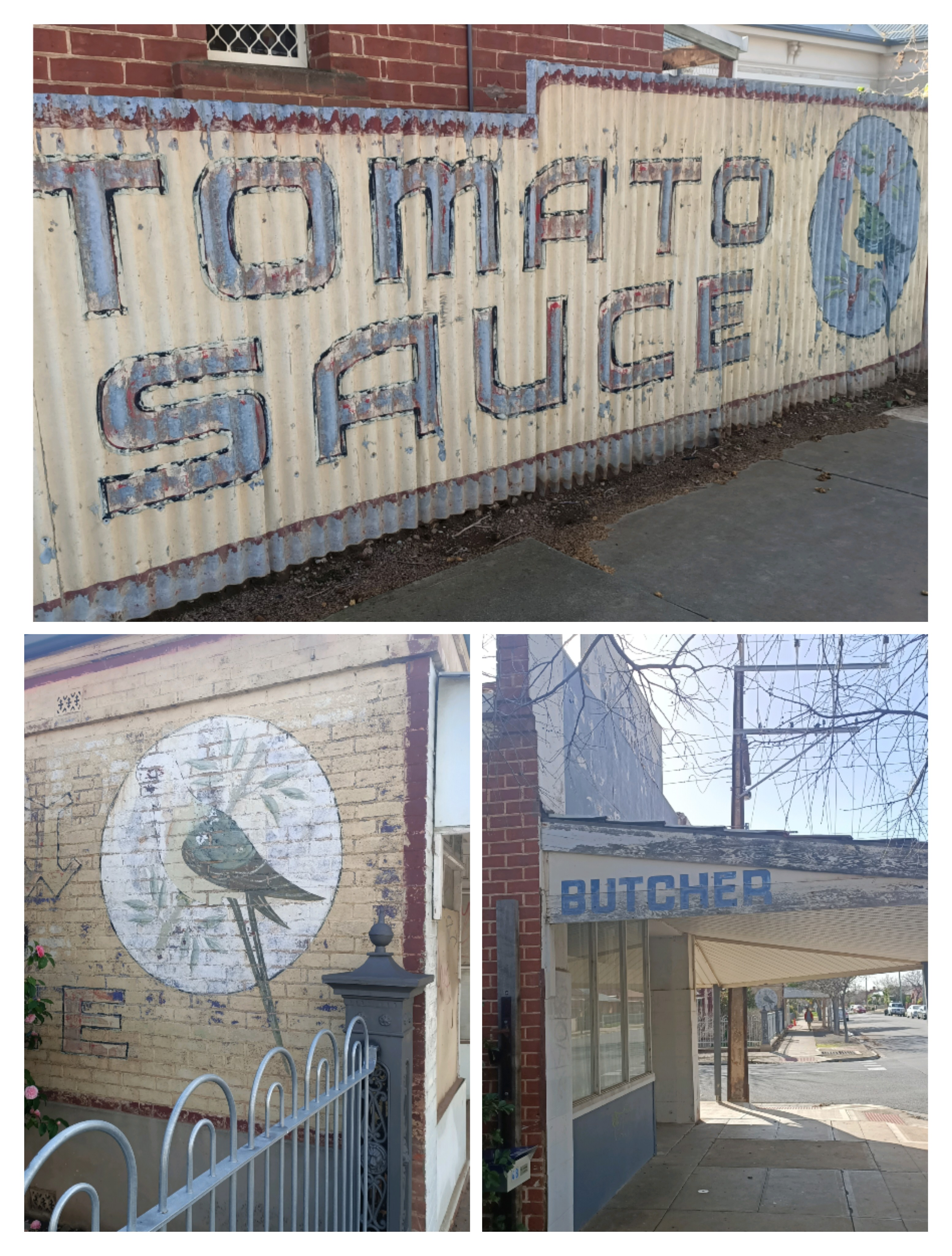
Examples of Old Australia still seen in the backstreets of Mile End today.

See also Greek Australians

== Politics ==
=== Federal ===
Mile End was split between two federal electorates until the boundary redistribution in 2018, with that part of the suburb west of South Road formerly having been a part of the division of Hindmarsh. The suburb is now wholly within the division of Adelaide. It has been represented by Labor MP Steve Georganas since 2019, and retained with a margin of 11.9% at the 2022 election.

=== State ===
Mile End is also a part of the state electoral district of West Torrens, held by Labor MP Tom Koutsantonis since 2002.

Because West Torrens extends throughout the western suburbs of Adelaide, voters are mainly low to middle income earners of working-class backgrounds. Due to this the electorate is considered a safe Labor seat, held by a margin of 18.3% since the 2006 election.

== Transport ==
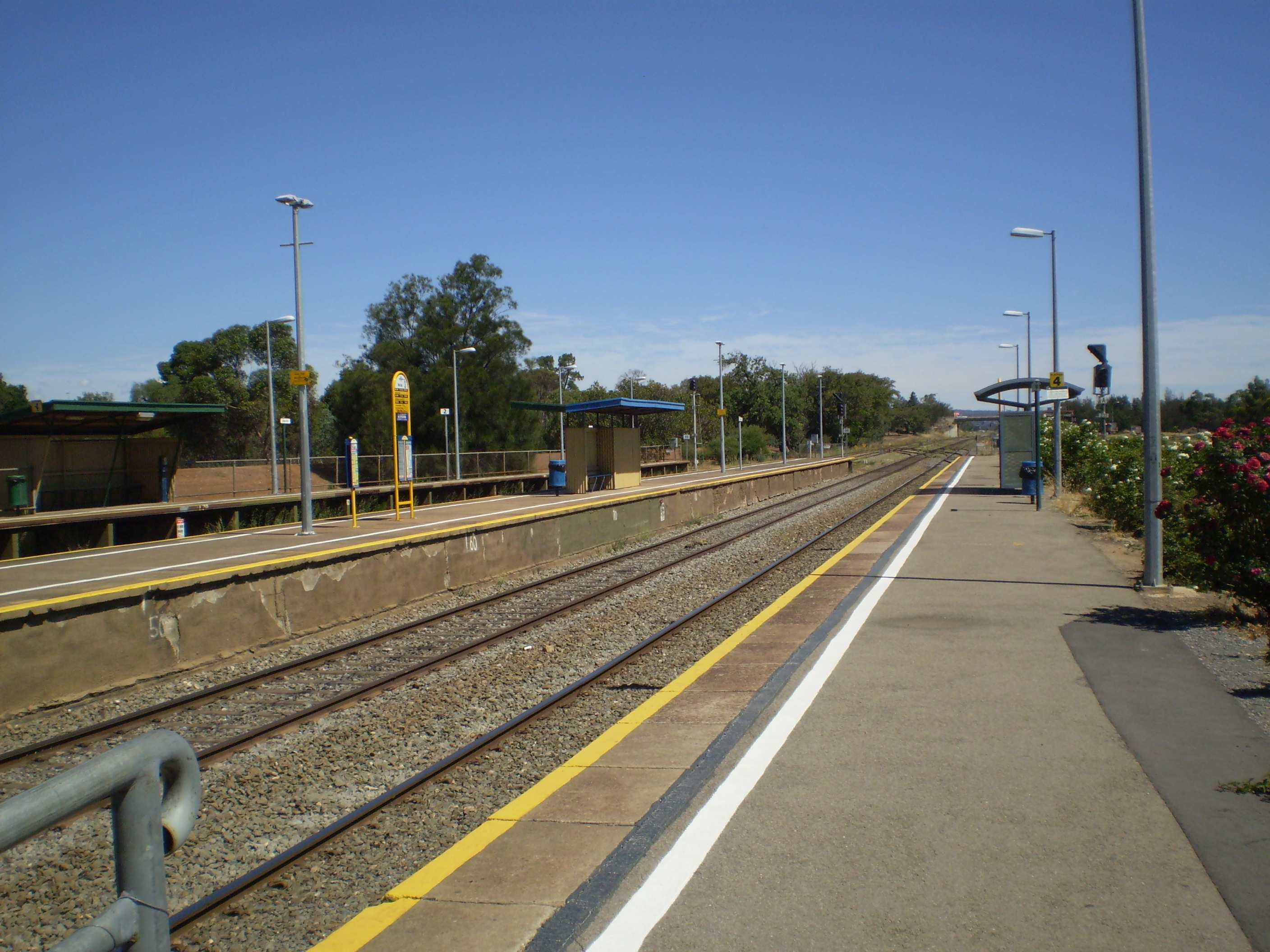
Mile End station

Cars are the preferred mode of transport in the suburb. According to the Australian Bureau of Statistics 61.8% of residents are drivers or passengers of cars for their commute to work. Mile End is connected to the major Adelaide thoroughfares of South Road, Sir Donald Bradman Drive and Henley Beach Road. Adelaide's city centre can typically be reached by car in 5 minutes.

Because of the area's short distance from major business districts, a larger proportion (5.6%) walk to work, while a slightly smaller number (2.7%) use a bike. Good connections to Adelaide's public transport network mean that 13.5% take the bus to work, while a smaller 0.5% of people use the train. Bus routes connect Mile End to the Adelaide city centre as well as Adelaide Airport, Glenelg and various locations in the western suburbs. Mile End railway station is located on the Seaford, Tonsley and Belair commuter railway lines, however services outside of peak hour only run hourly and there are no weekend, public holiday or night services.

== Notable organisations ==
Australian film maker, conservationist, survivor of an attack by a great white shark, and one of the world's foremost authorities on that species, Rodney Fox has his Shark Museum on Henley Beach Road in Mile End, across the road from the Thebarton Theatre.

In July 1992 the State Transport Authority opened a bus depot on the corner of Richmond Road and Railway Terrace. Today it is operated by Torrens Transit.

== Notable residents ==
- Claude Alfred Haigh (1904-1980) confectioner and bloodhorse breeder.
- Barbara Hanrahan (1939–1991) artist, printmaker and writer
- Kenneth Thomas Hardy (1900-1970) wine merchant.
- Allan McLean (1914-1989) (known as Bob McLean) cricketer, Australian Football Rules footballer, sporting administrator.
