= Jubilee Exhibition Railway =

Former railway line in Adelaide, South Australia

- Map of the railway

Overview
- Status: Closed and removed
- Locale: Adelaide, South Australia

Service
- System: South Australian Railways
- Operator(s): South Australian Railways

History
- Opened: 1887
- Closed: 1927

Technical
- Track gauge: 1,600 mm (5 ft 3 in)

The Jubilee Exhibition Railway was a railway spur in Adelaide, South Australia. It was built in 1887 from where the Adelaide station currently is to the Jubilee Exhibition Building which stood near Frome Road on what is now part of the University of Adelaide. The line used an existing tunnel under King William Road which had been built in 1854 for horses and cattle to cross the road without disrupting traffic. The tunnel is likely the origin of rumours about rail tunnels located under the city of Adelaide. Much of the land where the line once ran has been reused as parts of the University of Adelaide and the Adelaide Festival Centre. There were no stations built. No known evidence of the line remains today.

== History ==
West-facing view of the former Jubilee Exhibition Railway line alignment, just east of King William Street

The line was built for the Jubilee International Exhibition held in 1887. It was used to transport exhibits including heavy machinery and a locomotive and tender built in Ballarat. The line was not used to transport people to the exhibition so did not have a station platform at either end. Following the exhibition, the line continued to be used for transporting exhibits to the Exhibition building, and building materials for university buildings.

It later served the Adelaide Showgrounds which were located on the east side of what is now the grounds of University of Adelaide. In 1927 when the Adelaide Showgrounds moved to Wayville the line was seen as redundant. The line was closed and the tunnel under King William Road filled in.

== Passengers ==
The line never carried regular passenger service. During the Boer War, troops from the parade ground were taken to ships at Port Adelaide and during the 1919 Spanish flu pandemic, it was used to carry around 600 people from Melbourne to the quarantine camp on the Jubilee Oval.

== Later encounters ==
In 1973, the tunnel was rediscovered when construction on the Adelaide Festival Centre was taking place. The section of the tunnel uncovered was lined with bluestone about 5 metres wide and at least 10 metres long. The Adelaide city council investigated whether it would be worth reopening the tunnel as a pedestrian subway to complement the new festival centre. The state government agreed to contribute $35,000 towards the opening of the tunnel. Subsequently the costing was found to be grossly underestimated at $90,000-$140,000 so the project was abandoned and the excavations refilled.
