= Semaphore railway line =

Former railway line in Adelaide, South Australia

- Map of the line's route

Overview
- Status: Closed and Removed
- Locale: Adelaide, South Australia
- Termini: Adelaide; Semaphore
- Stations: 2

Service
- Type: Commuter rail

History
- Opened: 7 January 1878
- Closed: 29 October 1978

Technical
- Line length: 1.1 km (0.68 mi)

Semaphore railway line was a railway line in the Australian state of South Australia located in the north-west of Adelaide servicing the suburbs of Semaphore and Exeter. It had two stations: Semaphore and Exeter. The line opened in 1878 and closed in 1978.

== History ==
The Semaphore line was extended from Port Adelaide by South Australian Railways on 7 January 1878 with no intermediate stations. It was to serve both the new overseas shipping jetty at Semaphore, and for defence logistics along Military Road (in support of nearby Fort Largs and Fort Glanville). It remained the main line until 1908, when the Outer Harbor line was extended north from a junction created at Glanville station.

In 1917, when the Semaphore to Rosewater and Albert Park tram line was opened, there was a dispute over the tramline crossing the railway line near Exeter station. The Railway Commissioner vetoed trams crossing over the railway line. Trams continued to operate an isolated service between the crossing and Largs, with passengers having to walk across the railway line to use the adjoining tramline.

After a short period of time, the Municipal Tramways Trust instituted a service along the whole tramline, despite not having the Railway Commissioner's consent. In response, rail workers threatened to cut the tramline by dumping a load of sleepers on the tram tracks. An agreement was eventually reached to allow trams to cross the line, on the condition that a signal cabin was installed, with the signaller cutting-off power to trams when a train approached, thereby preventing trams from crossing the railway tracks in the face of trains. That system nearly caused a disaster when power was cut off while a tram was on the crossing . The tram was stranded on the railway line and an accident was barely avoided. The switches for cutting of power was then removed and replaced by a system of traffic lights.

The line closed on 29 October 1978, partly because traders on the north side of Semaphore road claimed they were losing business. The original stations have been demolished and practically no evidence of them remains. The original rail track has been dismantled, with only the wide median strip along Semaphore Road indicating the existence of the former railway

== Route ==
The original line continued from the terminus at Port Adelaide west along St Vincent Street, then over the new bridge and north then west along Semaphore Road. The midpoint of the line was Exeter station, which was located to the east side of where Swan Terrace and Woolnough Road intersect. The line terminated right next to the Esplanade at Semaphore station, which was located east of Esplanade Road (14.9 kilometres from Adelaide station). Its station platform was level with the northern part of the road. It later became a branch from Glanville station, and the route was altered in 1916 to avoid St Vincent Street.

== Line guide ==
Station	Image	Opened	Coordinates	Additional information
Semaphore		1878	34°50′18″S 138°28′51″E	Main terminus until Outer Harbor line was extended northwards in 1908; closed 29 October 1978
Exeter		1878 or 1882?	34°50′24″S 138°29′21″E	Closed 29 October 1978
Glanville		1878	34°50′32″S 138°29′36″E	Former branch station; still in use as part of the Outer Harbor line

== See also ==
- Semaphore (disambiguation)
