= Holdfast Bay railway line =

Former railway line in Adelaide, South Australia

Overview
- Status: Closed and removed
- Termini: Adelaide railway station; Colley Terrace, Glenelg

Service
- Operator(s): Holdfast Bay Railway Company (1880–1882); Adelaide, Glenelg & Suburban Railway Company (1882–1924); South Australian Railways (1924–1929)

History
- Opened: 24 May 1880
- Closed: December 1929

Technical
- Line length: 10.86 kilometres (6.75 miles)
- Number of tracks: Single initially, duplicated by 1914
- Track gauge: 1600 mm (5 ft 3 in)

The Holdfast Bay railway line was a railway in western Adelaide, built in 1880 to compete with the Adelaide, Glenelg & Suburban Railway Company. The line started at the Adelaide railway station, on the northern edge of the central business district, and proceeded to the northern edge of Mile End, South Australia immediately to the west of the city. From there the line headed south-west to the seaside suburb of Glenelg.

Today, much of the corridor in which the line ran remains as a rail trail for cyclists, which is known as the Westside Bikeway. Part of the north section of the corridor has been built over as James Congdon Drive. A platform remains on the site of Plympton station near Marion Road in the suburb of Plympton. The line was closed in 1929, after which remnants remained for some time, including rails across Marion Road in the 1950s. A signal from the line was preserved and put in the main pavilion of the National Railway Museum, Port Adelaide.

== History ==
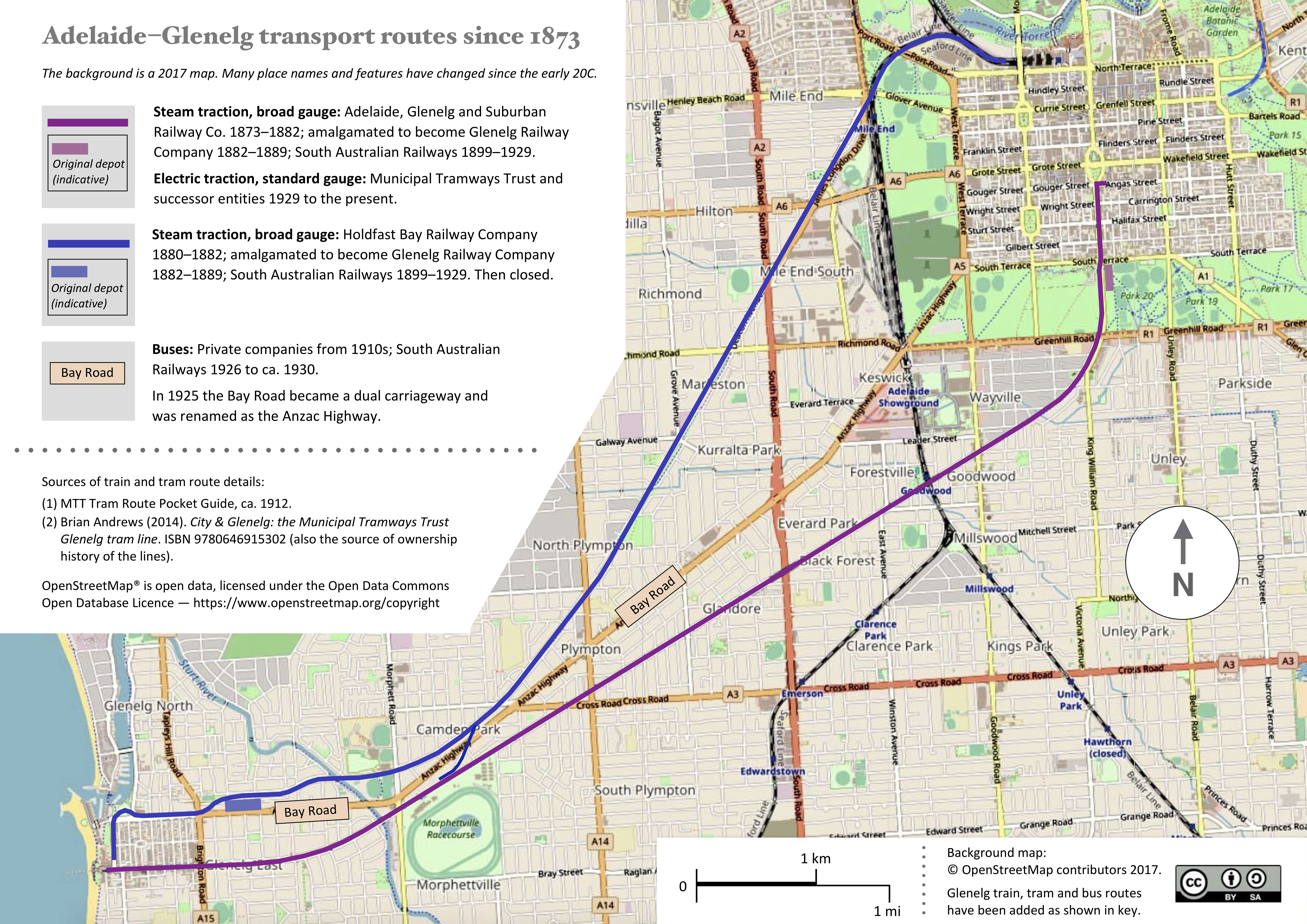
Transport routes Adelaide–Glenelg. The blue line is the route of the Holdfast Bay Railway Company; the purple line shows the pre-existing route of the Adelaide, Glenelg & Suburban Railway Company, with which the new company intended to compete. The latter route is now the Glenelg tram line.

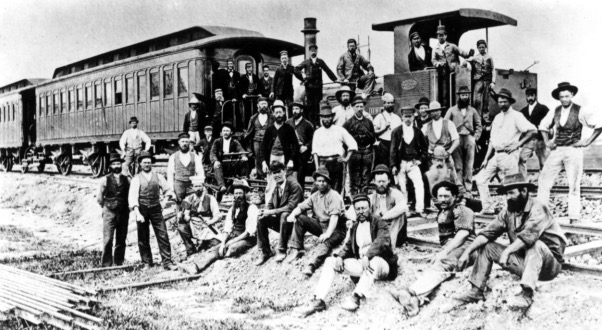
Track workers, quite likely during the line's construction in 1880. The South Australian Railways were to perpetuate construction of carriages with the same body design as shown for 66 years. Some, built as late as 1924, were to persist incongruously as trailer cars in modern 300/400 class "Red Hen" railcar consists until 1987.

The line was constructed to compete with the existing Glenelg railway line (now the Glenelg tram line), which ran from Victoria Square, the geographic centre of the City of Adelaide, to the Glenelg seafront at Moseley Square. Passenger satisfaction on that line had declined to the extent that a group of promoters decided to set up a competitor company.

After the Holdfast Bay Railway Company Limited was incorporated, it commenced construction on 20 August 1879. The line opened on 24 May 1880. The company ran services from the existing Adelaide railway station, paying a fee to use the portion of track owned by the South Australian Railways (SAR) between Adelaide and Mile End stations, from where the line branched off just before Mile End station. A locomotive depot was built at St Leonards (now in the suburb of Glenelg North). At the end of the line in Glenelg, in Althorpe Place, there was a locomotive run-around loop, a siding for goods traffic, a scissors crossover for rail vehicles to change tracks, and a curve into Moseley Square to provide for goods traffic to and from the jetty. Trips took only 20 minutes to Glenelg, 5 minutes shorter than the existing line. Two trains ran in the morning from Glenelg to Adelaide and two from Adelaide to Glenelg in the afternoon.

Initial motive power consisted of three Beyer, Peacock & Company 2-4-0 side tank locomotives similar to the South Australian Railways G class locomotives nos 23 and 24. Soon the company ordered two more, this time 0-4-4 tank engines. Initial rolling stock consisted of six passenger cars from the United States with a six-wheel Cleminson configuration. With 13.72-metre (45.0-foot) bodies, seating 60 passengers, they were identical to an American Civil War style of 1860.

The company initially operated 13 trains each way on weekdays, 14 on Saturdays and 7 on Sundays. Most ran express between Adelaide and St Leonards; some stopped at Plympton and Camden. The line, known as the "North Terrace line", proved very popular with rail travellers, mainly because it terminated in the city only 400 metres (440 yards) from the main business centre in Rundle Street, whereas its competitor's terminus in Victoria Square was twice that distance. Moreover, the running time of 20 minutes was five minutes shorter.

In 1880, even though the population of Glenelg was only 2500, the two companies carried 800,000 passengers – about 2200 daily. The next year, patronage rose to 1,215,000 or 3300 per day. On Proclamation Day 1882 the two companies carried 35,000 between them. Nevertheless, a considerable impediment for the Holdfast Bay Railway Company was the SAR's access fees: an annual payment of £1,000 for running rights between Adelaide Station and Mile End, plus two shillings and sixpence per additional train.

Less than a year after the line opened, it had become evident that there was insufficient business for two companies; the profit of the Victoria Square railway had slumped by more than 50 per cent. The companies agreed to carry on business in co-partnership as from 24 December 1880. On 12 November 1881, (Note: An alternative reported date was 11 May 1882.) the two merged to form the Glenelg Railway Company Limited. Both lines continued to run services. Business assets such as maintenance facilities were shared to reduce costs, and the South Terrace depot was consequently closed. Rolling stock was transferred between the two lines via a new connecting line along Brighton Road.

The Glenelg Railway Company was acquired by the SAR and steam services continued, with the Holdfast Bay line duplicated from Mile End to St Leonards by 1914 and raised platforms being provided at most stations. A branch line running across Bay Road (now Anzac Highway) was constructed to provide services to Morphettville Racecourse, though it did not make a connection with the other rail line.

In 1924, William A. Webb, the railways commissioner, proposed that the two Glenelg railways be given to the Municipal Tramways Trust (MTT) and be converted from steam railways into electric tramways. The government, following Webb's recommendation, acquired both railways and electrified the Glenelg railway line (now the Glenelg tram line). On the day when the conversion was completed in December 1929, South Australian Railways stopped running trains on the Holdfast Bay line. After the closure, the MTT began the operation of bus services from the city to Plympton.

The Holdfast Bay line was originally intended to become electrified with the Glenelg line, and small scale works on its conversion had begun, including drilling holes for power lines. However, with the onset of the Great Depression, conversion works were halted and steam services did not resume. Parts of the remaining corridor, primarily beyond Camden station, were sold to private holders in 1938, and the remainder to the South Australian Government in 1940. The MATS Plan in the 1960s proposed an expressway be constructed in the corridor.

== See also ==
- Wilson, Tom; Racliffe, John; Steele, Christopher (2021). Adelaide's public transport – the first 180 years. Adelaide, South Australia: Wakefield Press. ISBN 9781743058855.
- Railways in Adelaide
- List of Adelaide railway stations
- List of closed Adelaide railway stations
