= Thomas Hardy (winemaker) =

Australian winemaker

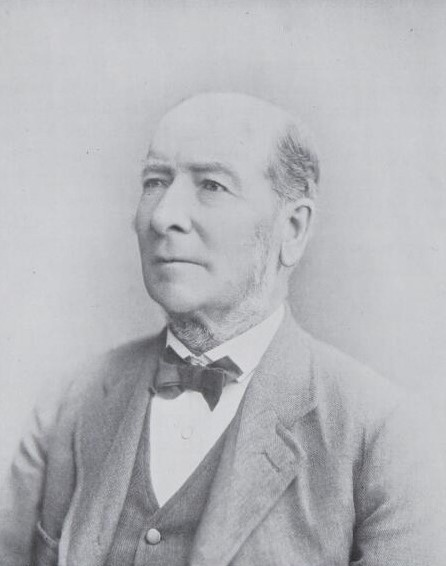

Thomas Hardy (14 January 1830 – 10 January 1912) was a winemaker in the McLaren Vale, South Australia. He has been called the "Father of the South Australian Wine Industry".

== History ==
Thomas Hardy was born in Gittisham in Devon. He and Joanna Holbrook, whom he later married, arrived in South Australia on the British Empire on 14 August 1850. While on the voyage he acted as schoolmaster to the boys on board, while one Mrs. J. Gillard is reported as having taught the girls, however that name does not appear on passenger lists. He soon found work with John Reynell at Reynella Farm, and learned much of winemaking from the German fellow-workers. After two years he left for the goldfields of Victoria, where he was quite successful working with a butcher and droving cattle to the diggings from Yankalilla. He then started work on a station near Normanville. In 1853 he purchased a property of 46 acres (18.6 ha) on the River Torrens which he called "Bankside", now Underdale, near the present Hardys Road.

In 1854 he planted 2 acres (0.8 ha) of fruit trees, mainly oranges, and 0.75 acres (0.3 ha) of Shiraz vines which he enlarged in 1856, then added an acre of Muscatel table grapes in 1861. He made his first wine in 1857 and exported two hogsheads to England in 1859, one of the first exports of wine from South Australia. By 1863 his vineyards covered 35 acres (14 ha) of Grenache, Mataro, Muscat, Roussillon, Shiraz and Zante grapes. He also purchased grapes from other vignerons in the Adelaide area. By 1879 his vintage had reached 27,000 gallons (100,000 litres).

He purchased "Brookside" of 24 acres (10 ha) at Marion, South Australia in April 1862, planted it with grapes and put John Western in charge. Western was followed in 1884 by son-in-law Arthur Quick, who took it over in 1910.

In 1874 Hardy, with A. M. Bickford and Sons, W. N. Crowder and others founded a bottle works in Chief Street, Brompton which began production in 1875, and eventually became the South Australian Glass Works Co. Ltd.

The Tintara winery at McLaren Vale was built by Dr. Alexander Charles Kelly and purchased by Hardy in 1877 and was used for wine production until 1927. In 1878 or 1879 he expanded his McLaren Vale holding by purchasing a disused flour mill and the Bellevue Hotel (both of which still stand).

He started Adelaide's first wine bar.

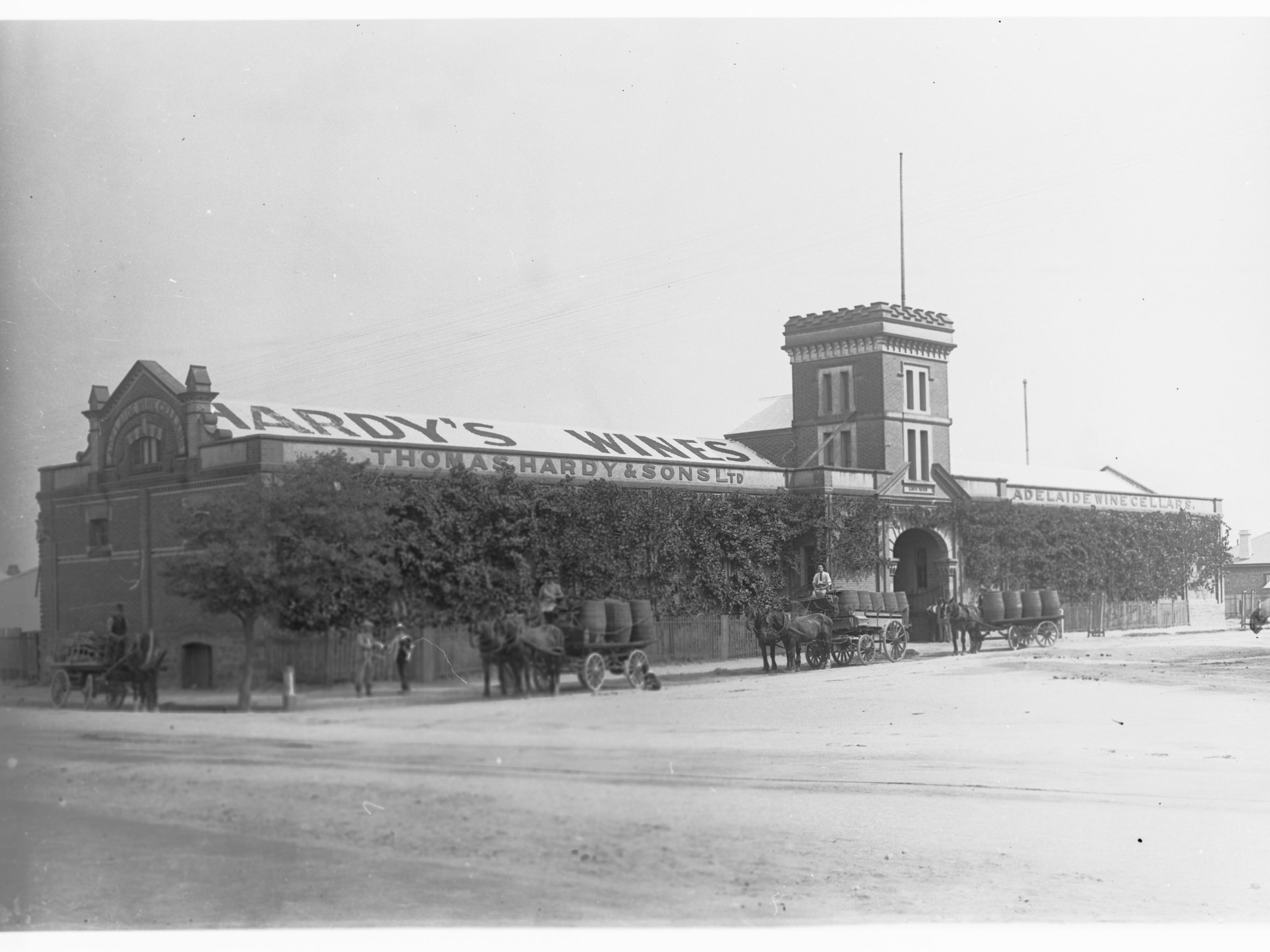
Thomas Hardy & Sons Ltd Wine Cellars, built in 1893 on East Terrace in Mile End

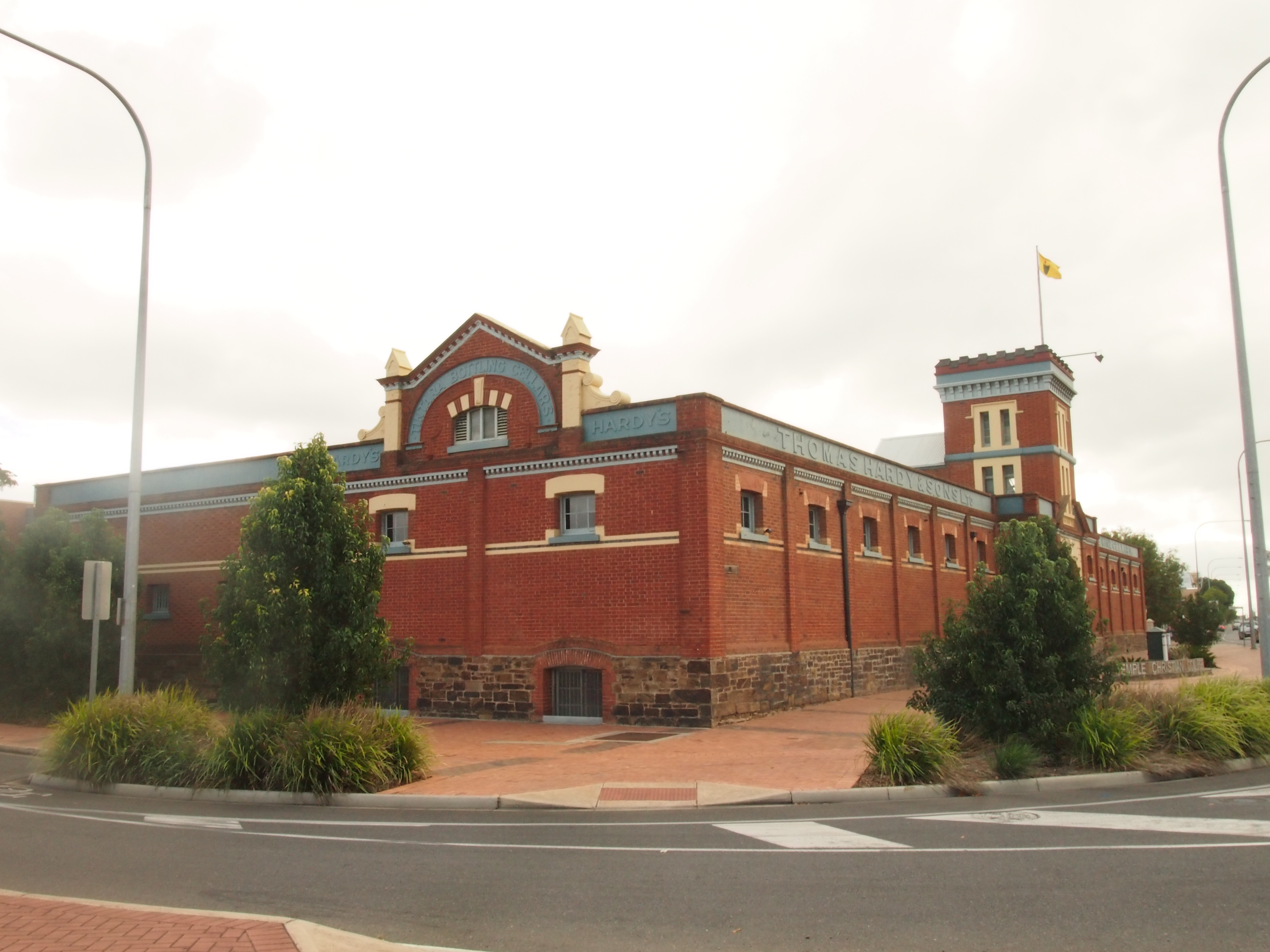
Former Thomas Hardy & Sons Ltd Wine Cellars, since 1984 the Mile End campus of Temple Christian College

In 1881 he built a four-storey warehouse, head office and bottling cellars "Tintara House" (demolished 1961) at 87–89 Currie Street. In 1887 he founded Thomas Hardy and Sons Ltd. with his three sons James J. Hardy, Thomas N. Hardy and Robert B. Hardy, and Joseph Rowe Osborn.

Hardy planted specimens of various grape varieties at Adelaide Botanic Gardens, but these were subsequently removed to provide more open space for recreation purposes.

He founded a jam manufacturing company with premises at Dequetteville Terrace later occupied by Adelaide Malting and Brewing Company and now a block of luxury apartments.

The Mile End cellars were built in 1893. Around this time Thomas Hardy and Sons were South Australia's largest wine producers. The Bankside winery was destroyed by fire in 1904. It was not rebuilt.

He oversaw the destruction of a Geelong, Victorian vineyard infected with Phylloxera and was a prime mover in writing the Phylloxera Act of 1879.

== Later developments ==
Around 1910 management of the company passed to his son Robert, followed in 1928 by Robert's nephew (Thomas' grandson) Thomas Mayfield Hardy.

Bankside was sold to F. G. Gill. The homestead was demolished in 1962.

In 1976 the company acquired Emu Wines with a high export profile and vineyards in Western Australia.

Hardy's had 320 acres (130 ha) at McLaren Vale and other vineyards at Dorrien, Keppoch and Waikerie.

== Personal ==
- Member of the Royal Agricultural and Horticultural Society for many years, and in 1904 was elected president.
- Member of the Chamber of Manufactures
- Member of the Agricultural Bureau
- Member of the West Torrens School Board of Advice
- Member of the Winegrowers Association
- Member of the West Torrens Council

== Family ==
Hardy's sister Martha Hardy (c. 1830 – 25 May 1909), died at Bankside Vineyards. She married Frederick Stoward; they had at least three sons, all born in Axbridge, UK:

- John Hardy Stoward (c. 1850 – 20 April 1940) married Mary Kate (c. 1860–1926), lived 37 Holbrooks Road, Underdale

- only daughter Hilda Amy Stoward (1884– ) married schoolmaster Arthur Leonard Davidson (1886–1918) in 1912. He was killed in action.
- sons Jack and Frank

- Frederick Stoward (1866 – 14 December 1931) was brought out to South Australia by his uncle Thomas c. 1881. Fred Stoward married, they had one daughter.
- Tom Hardy Stoward (15 August 1873 – 26 March 1941) was brought out to South Australia by his uncle Thomas in 1888, married Edith Ellen Gilbert (22 Jun 1872 – 27 Apr 1951) on 16 June 1900 at Mount Barker, South Australia; they had two sons and a daughter, teacher Phyllis May Stoward (1901–1967)

Thomas Hardy (14 January 1830 – 10 January 1912) married Joanna or Johanna Holbrook (c. 1827 – 24 January 1868) in 1854. He married a second time, to his cousin Eliza Hardy (c. 1834 – 27 November 1886) of Colyton, Devon on 29 September 1869. His children included:

- Anna Elizabeth Hardy (3 January 1854 – 15 May 1931), a nurse, she was in later years her father's aide and companion.
- James Joseph "Jim" Hardy (30 October 1855 – 14 June 1904)
- Caroline Adelaide Hardy (1857 – 5 June 1885) married Arthur Quick of "Brookside", Marion
- Thomas Nathaniel "Tom" Hardy (c. 1862 – 15 June 1911) married J. L. "Louie" Mayfield ( – 12 October 1910) of "Ivanhoe", Kensington on 12 November 1889

- Dorothy Hardy ( – )
- Tom Mayfield Hardy (c. 1892 – 25 October 1938) Chairman and managing director 1924–1938. Killed near Mount Dandenong in crash of plane "Kyeema" with Hugo Gramp of Orlando and Sydney Hill Smith of Yalumba wineries

- James Hardy (29 November 1932 – 14 June 2023 )

- Robert Burrough "Bob" Hardy ( – 16 August 1927) married Esther Lavinia Simpson of Gilberton on 5 January 1893. Managing director 1912–1924.

- Robert Cyril Hardy (26 June 1894 – 7 May 1917 died in action, France)
- Kenneth Thomas Hardy (23 May 1900 – 13 November 1970) managing director 1938 to 1965; succeeded by Thomas Walter Hardy

- Gertrude Mary Hardy (c. October 1877 – 30 July 1878)
- youngest daughter Eliza J. Hardy ( – 3 March 1911) married William V. Anstis of Ballarat, Victoria

== Recognition ==
At the Adelaide Exhibition of 1881 he was awarded a trophy valued at 100 guineas awarded by Sir Edwin Smith for the "exhibit of greatest national importance to the State".

Hardy Street, Goodwood, South Australia, was named in his honour, as he had purchased a portion of the suburb in May 1838, and sold it to his son Arthur in 1841.

== Sources ==
- Bishop, Geoffrey C. The Vineyards of Adelaide Lynton publications, Blackwood, South Australia ISBN 0 86946 280 6
- O'Neill, Sally, 'Hardy, Thomas (1830–1912)', Australian Dictionary of Biography, National Centre of Biography, Australian National University, https://adb.anu.edu.au/biography/hardy-thomas-3716/text5767, accessed 7 September 2012.
