= Tube Mills railway station =

Former railway station in South Australia, Australia

Coordinates: 34°51′14″S 138°34′42″E

Tube Mills railway station was a station on the Gawler line located in the inner northern Adelaide, suburb of Kilburn. It was located approximately 8.4 kilometres from Adelaide station, and was demolished in the late 1980s.

The British Tube Mills (later Tubemakers) factory was located adjacent and the station could only be accessed from the factory.

Trains were scheduled to stop at Tube Mills for shift changes, but outside these times, some trains were timetabled to stop at Tube Mills on request.

The British Tube Mills works were served by rail. Rail access to the works was via the Up North Main only, meaning trains either had to come from Dry Creek and shunt into the works or work "wrong line" from Islington.

The British Tube Mills works were originally located on both sides of Churchill Road. Rail access to the eastern works was provided via a level crossing over Churchill Road. The level crossing has long since been removed, but evidence of it is still visible.
