= Semaphore railway station =

Former railway station in South Australia, Australia

Semaphore

General information
- Location: Esplanade Road, Semaphore, South Australia
- Operator: State Transport Authority
- Line: Semaphore line
- Platforms: 1
- Tracks: 1

Construction
- Structure type: Ground

Other information
- Status: Demolished

History
- Opened: 7 January 1878
- Closed: 29 October 1978

Semaphore railway station was the terminus of the Semaphore railway line in the South Australian suburb of Semaphore.

== History ==
Semaphore railway station opened on 7 January 1878 when the line was extended from Port Adelaide by South Australian Railways to with no intermediate stations. It was to serve both the new overseas shipping jetty at Semaphore, and for defence logistics along Military Road (in support of nearby Fort Largs and Fort Glanville). It remained the main line until the Outer Harbor railway line was extended north from a junction created at Glanville in 1908.

The station closed on 29 October 1978 when passenger services between Glanville and Semaphore were withdrawn, largely because traders on the north side of Semaphore Road claimed that they were losing business. There is no longer any trace of the station.
