= Nurlutta railway station =

Railway station in Adelaide, South Australia

Coordinates: 34°45′05″S 138°38′38″E

Nurlutta
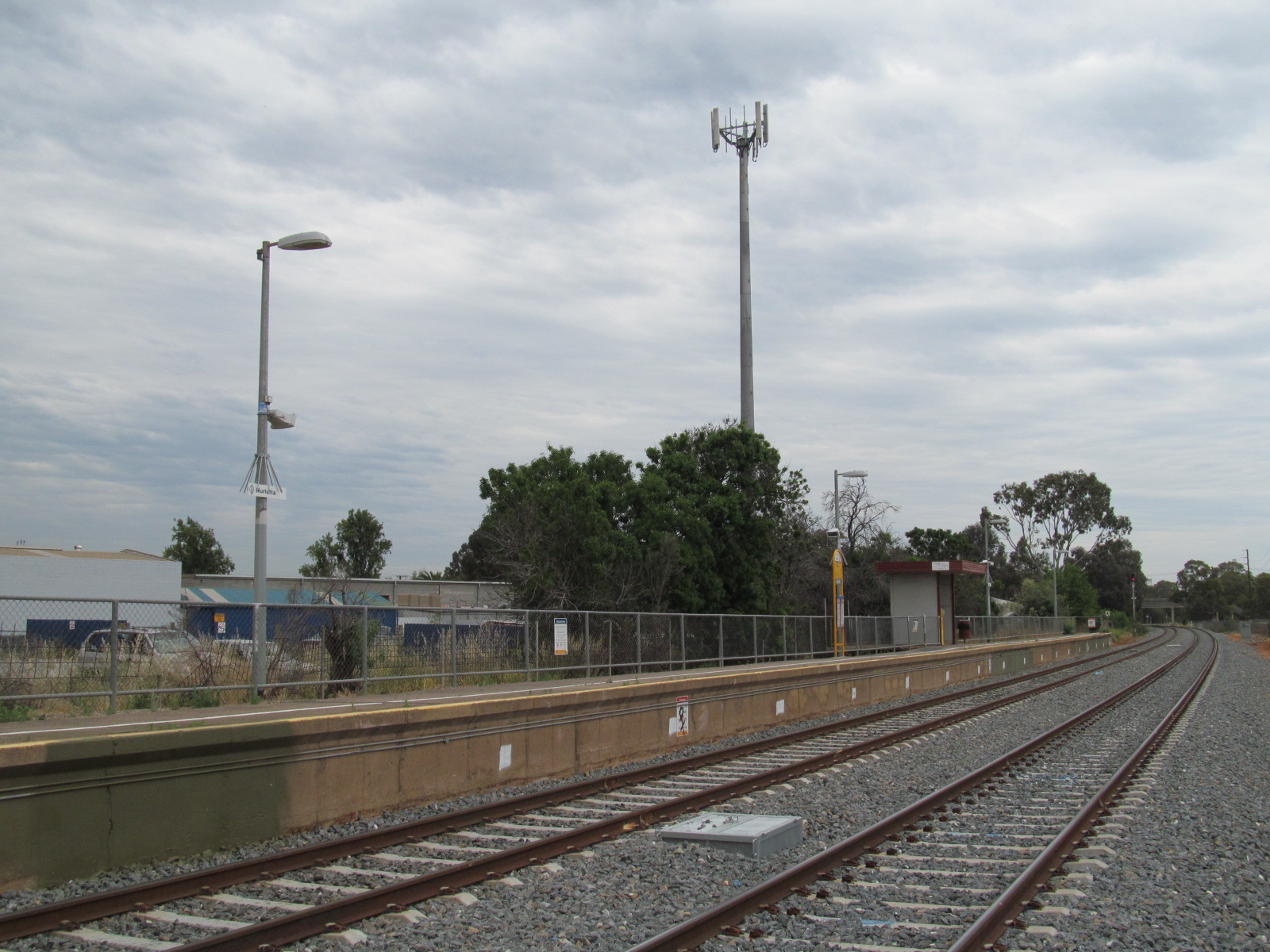
- Southbound view of Platform 2, October 2012

General information
- Location: Commercial Road, Salisbury
- Owner: Department for Infrastructure and Transport
- Operator: Adelaide Metro
- Line: Gawler
- Distance: 21.5 km from Adelaide
- Platforms: 2
- Tracks: 2
- Connections: None

Construction
- Structure type: Ground
- Parking: No
- Cycle facilities: No
- Accessible: Yes

Other information
- Station code: 16549 (to City); 18549 (to Gawler Central)
- Website: Adelaide Metro

History
- Opened: 1950

Services
Preceding station	Adelaide Metro	Following station
Salisbury towards Adelaide	Gawler line	Elizabeth South towards Gawler Central
Location

Nurlutta railway station is located on the Gawler line. Situated in the northern Adelaide suburb of Salisbury, it is 21.5 kilometres (13.4 mi) from Adelaide station.

== History ==
The station opened in 1950 and facilities consist of two 91 metre long platforms with small shelters.

Until 1976, Nurlutta was the only station on the Adelaide suburban system to have platforms either side of a level crossing. Trains are required to cross the Commercial Road level crossing before stopping at the appropriate platform, minimising the amount of time the level crossing is closed for vehicle traffic. This feature was duplicated in 1976 when a second platform at Seacliff opened. Kilburn has, and Munno Para prior to its renovation also had, the same feature.

== Platforms and Services ==
Nurlutta has two staggered side platforms, and is serviced by Adelaide Metro trains. Trains are scheduled every 30 minutes, seven days a week.

Platform	Destination
1	Gawler and Gawler Central
2	Adelaide
