= Mile End Goods railway station =

Former railway station in South Australia, Australia

Coordinates: 34°55′59″S 138°34′53″E

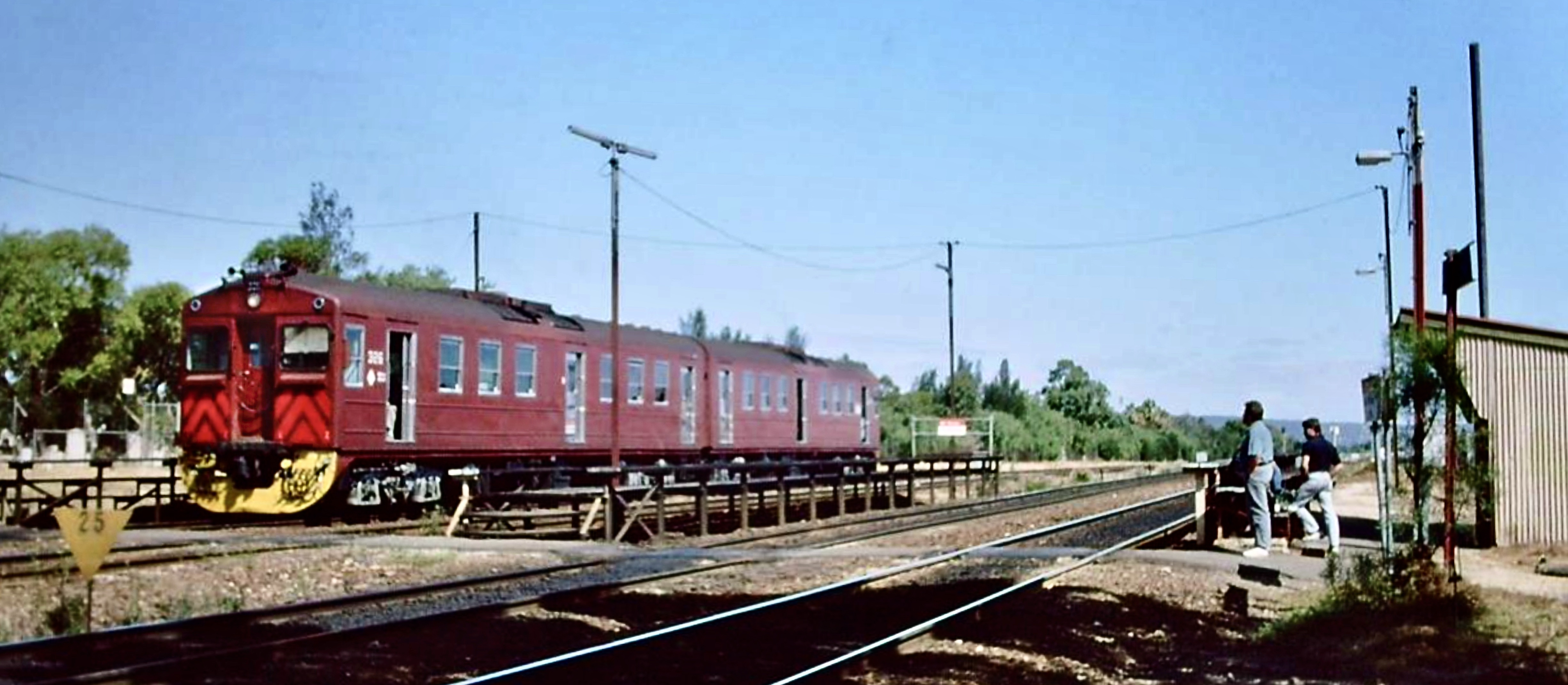
- Mile End Goods station looking south-east on 24 February 1992, with a two-car "Red Hen" 300 class railcar consist heading from Adelaide. The wooden step-down platforms were the last in the Adelaide metropolitan area.

General information
- Location: Anzac Highway; Mile End
- Lines: Belair Line, Seaford Line, Tonsley Line
- Distance: 2.9 kilometres (1.8 miles) from Adelaide railway station

Construction
- Structure type: Wooden step-down platforms, demolished

History
- Opened: September 1913
- Closed: October 1994
Location

Mile End Goods railway station was a railway station located in the suburb of Mile End on the western fringe of the Adelaide city centre in South Australia. It was located 2.9 kilometres (1.8 miles) from Adelaide station, about 400 metres (440 yards) south of the Hilton Bridge.

== History ==
The congested state of the Adelaide railway yard prompted the South Australian Railways, in 1909, to start building large marshalling and goods sidings at Mile End, adjacent to the junction of the main South line and the Holdfast Bay railway line. When work was completed in 1913, all goods handling at the Adelaide yard was transferred to Mile End. In 1912, a new steel bridge over the River Torrens and a triangle loop skirting the Adelaide Gaol gave access to both the North and Port lines.

The station was opened in September 1913 to serve the Mile End goods yard immediately to the west of the South Line. The West Terrace Cemetery was to the east and the newly constructed Hilton road bridge to the north. Cheaply constructed, the station consisted solely of four wooden step-down platforms, each 42.7 metres (140 feet) long. Although most passengers were people working in the goods yard, some were visitors to West Terrace Cemetery; there was no public access from the suburb of Mile End. Although many trains did not stop there, 37 trains were scheduled to do so on weekdays in 1952.

In the 1930s or 1940s the station was renamed Mile End (Freight).

The adjacent yard not only handled freight headed to and from Adelaide; it also acted as a depot for many of the locomotives hauling trains on the South and other lines.

In the 1980s and early 1990s, a decline in activity at the goods yards reduced patronage at the station. Although only selected trains stopped there, stopping trains there for few people inconvenienced large numbers of passengers since it was so close to Adelaide station. Significant expenditure was required to maintain the last timber step-down platform on the metropolitan network in a safe condition. It was consequently closed, with little public complaint, on 16 October 1994.

== Works consulted ==
- Pantlin G. and Sargent J. (eds). Railway stations in greater metropolitan Adelaide. Train Hobby Publications, Melbourne. 2005.
- South Australian Railways Working Timetable Book No. 265 effective 10:00am, Sunday, 30 June 1974.
