= Elizabeth South railway station =

Railway station in Adelaide, South Australia

Elizabeth South
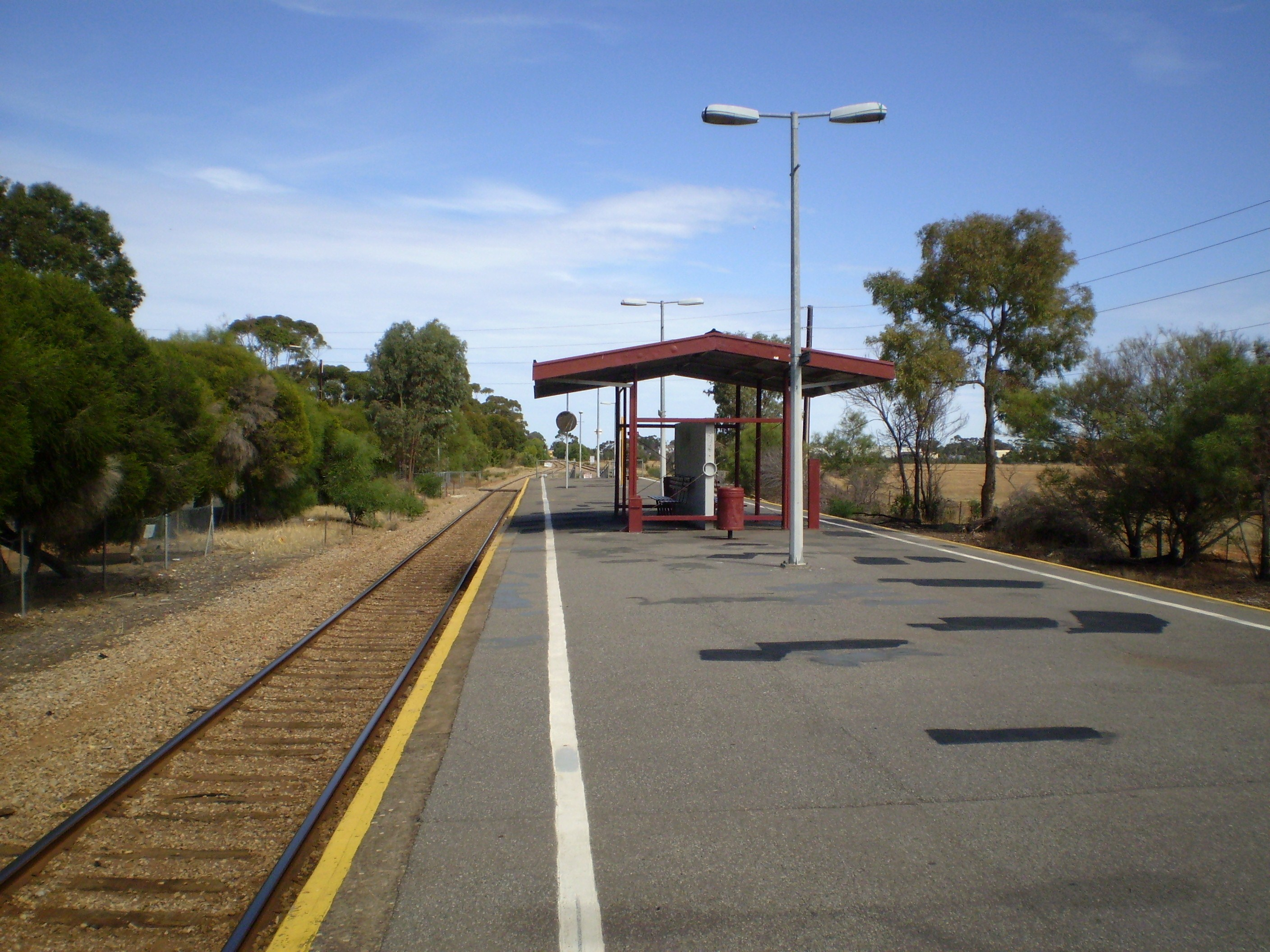
- Southbound view from Platform 2, April 2008

General information
- Location: Willison Road, Elizabeth South
- Coordinates: 34°43′52″S 138°39′21″E
- Owner: Department for Infrastructure & Transport
- Operator: Adelaide Metro
- Line: Gawler
- Distance: 24 km from Adelaide
- Platforms: 2
- Tracks: 2
- Connections: None

Construction
- Structure type: Ground
- Parking: Yes
- Cycle facilities: Yes
- Accessible: Yes

Other information
- Station code: 16513 (to City); 18550 (to Gawler Central)
- Website: Adelaide Metro

History
- Opened: 1955
- Rebuilt: April 2012

Services
Preceding station	Adelaide Metro	Following station
Nurlutta towards Adelaide	Gawler line	Elizabeth towards Gawler Central
Location

Elizabeth South railway station is located on the Gawler line. Situated on the border of northern Adelaide suburbs of Elizabeth South and Edinburgh, it is 24 kilometres (15 mi) from Adelaide station.

== History ==
The station opened in 1955.

It once had a shelter and ticket office identical to that of Woodlands Park, but this was replaced in the late 1970s or early 1980s. On its western side, the station is adjacent to the Defence Science & Technology Group's Edinburgh site, and there is a walking track to the station for employees of DST Group. It has an island platform between the two railway tracks. Pedestrians cross the tracks at level since the underpass was closed due to concerns about safety and vandalism.

The original station was demolished and rebuilt between September 2011 and April 2012, during Gawler line rail revitalisation works.

== Platforms and Services ==
Elizabeth South has one island platform and is serviced by Adelaide Metro. Trains are scheduled every 30 minutes, seven days a week.

Platform	Destination
1	Gawler and Gawler Central
2	Adelaide
