= Mile End railway station, Adelaide =

Railway station in Adelaide, South Australia

Mile End
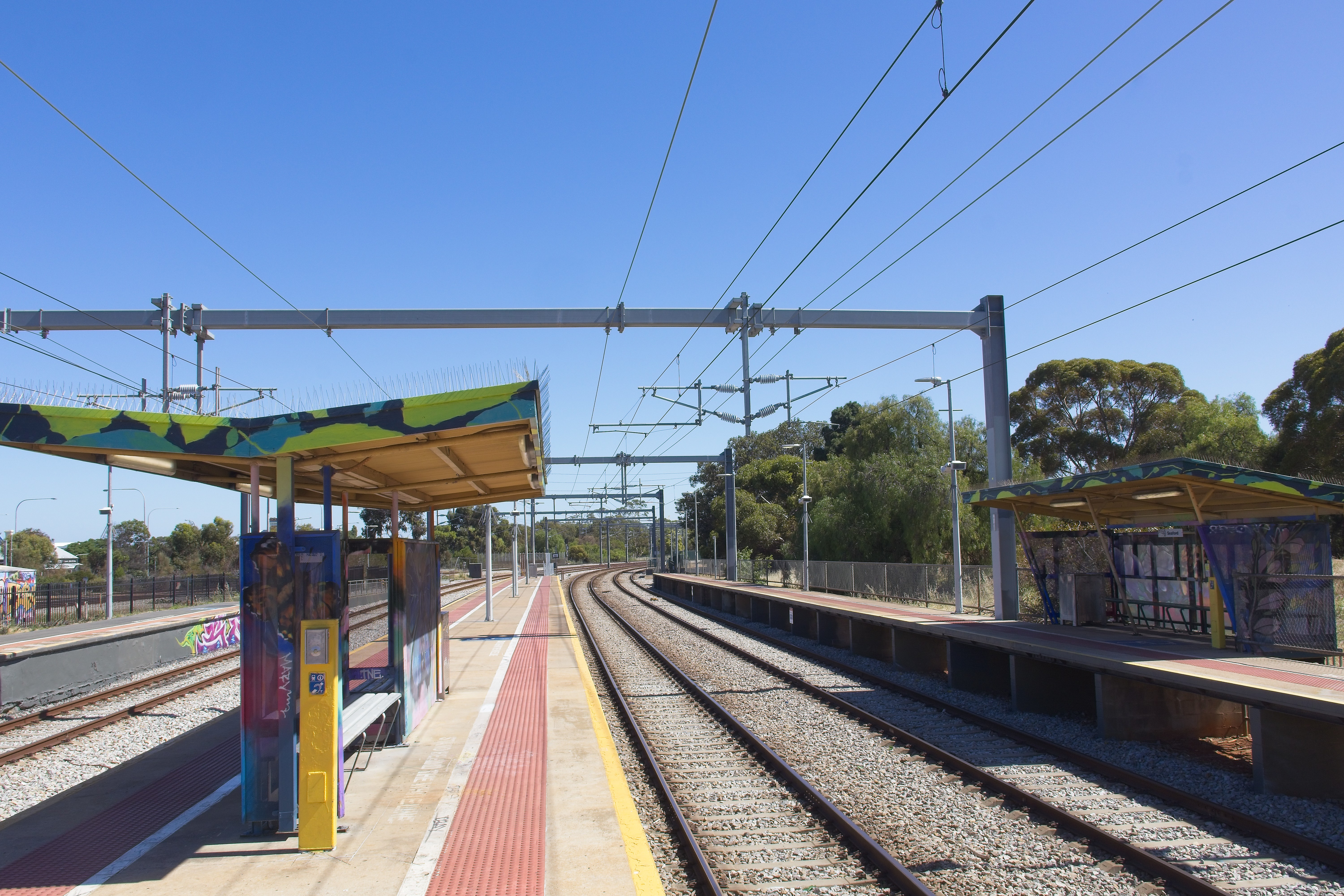
- Northbound view from Platform 2 in 2025

General information
- Location: James Congdon Drive, Mile End, South Australia
- Coordinates: 34°55′30″S 138°34′48″E
- Owner: Department for Infrastructure & Transport
- Operator: Adelaide Metro
- Line: Belair Flinders Seaford
- Distance: 2.0 km (1.2 mi) from Adelaide railway station
- Platforms: 4
- Tracks: 5
- Connections: None

Construction
- Structure type: Ground (1 island, 2 side)
- Parking: No
- Cycle facilities: No
- Accessible: Yes

Other information
- Station code: 16542 (to City); 18582 (to Seaford, Flinders, Belair)
- Website: Adelaide Metro

History
- Opened: 1898

Services
| Preceding station | Adelaide Metro | Following station |
|---|---|---|
| Adelaide Terminus | Belair line | Adelaide Showground towards Belair |
| Adelaide Terminus | Flinders line | Adelaide Showground towards Flinders |
| Adelaide Terminus | Seaford line | Adelaide Showground towards Seaford |
Location

Mile End railway station, in the Australian state of South Australia, is on Adelaide's main South Line, with services to Belair, Seaford and Flinders. It lies between the inner western suburb of Mile End and the Park Lands, 2.0 kilometres (1.2 miles) from Adelaide railway station. Access is from Ellis Park, in the Park Lands, and from Mile End.

== History ==
The station opened in 1898, and was alternatively known as "Mile End Passenger" station to distinguish it from Mile End Goods station.

The station now mainly services Belair line trains from the two western platforms and Seaford and Flinders from the eastern platforms.

== Public criticism ==
Mile End station has been criticised for being below contemporary standards. In 2016, the station was ranked as the worst station in the western suburbs, especially because of the absence of toilets or other amenities on platforms or nearby, and waiting shelters that needed replacing. Pedestrian access from the adjacent Park Lands is only via an old, narrow underpass. The pedestrian footpath from James Congdon Drive crosses three widely spaced tracks and before reaching the platforms passengers occasionally have to wait several minutes for trains to pass – in particular, interstate freight trains more than a kilometre long on the 1435 mm (4 ft 8 1/2 in) standard-gauge track that runs past the station. The platforms are narrow and too short. The station also does not feature any on-station passenger information other than timetables. The platforms are too short for coupled "A-City" 4000 class electric multiple unit trainsets which run on special event days. The other platform is shortened for Belair line trains, which run in two-car sets.

== Services by platform ==
| Platform | Destination/s | Notes |
|---|---|---|
| 1 | Seaford/Flinders | To Belair (occasionally used) |
| 2 | Adelaide | |
| 3 | Seaford/Flinders/Belair | |
| 4 | Adelaide | |

== See also ==
- Mile End Goods railway station
