= Royal Australian Army Medical Corps =

Administrative corps of the Australian Army

- Cap badge of the RAAMC
- Active: 1902 – present day
- Country: Australia
- Branch: Australian Army
- Nickname: Linseed Lancers
- Mottos: Paulatim (Latin, "little by little")
- March: Here's a Health Unto His Majesty
- Anniversaries: 10 November (corps day)

Commanders
- Colonel-in-Chief: Governor-General of Australia ex officio (presently Sam Mostyn)
- Notable commanders: Major General Sir Neville Reginald Howse; Major General Sir Samuel Roy Burston

Insignia
- Corps Flag

The Royal Australian Army Medical Corps (RAAMC) is the branch of the Australian Army responsible for providing medical care to Army personnel. The AAMC was formed in 1902 through the amalgamation of medical units of the various Australian colonies and was first deployed to South Africa as a small detachment of personnel supporting the Australian Commonwealth Horse during the Second Boer War. The corps has participated in every Australian Army operation since then, including wars and peacekeeping operations. The "Royal" prefix was granted in 1948.

== History ==
The Australian Army Medical Corps was formed on 1 July 1902 by combining the medical services of the armed forces of the various Australian colonies that had been in existence before Federation, which had their origins in the medical structures of the British forces that had deployed to Australia during the late 18th and early 19th centuries. The corps' first deployment was to the Second Boer War, where it provided a field hospital and a stretcher bearer company attached in support of the Australian Commonwealth Horse, the first contingent of Australian troops deployed operationally following Federation. The force's role was limited as by the time it was deployed the large scale fighting was basically over. Prior to this, though, the various colonial forces had also contributed medical detachments to the war in support of their own and other British and colonial forces, and these units – consisting of various types of medical personnel including surgeons, dentists, cooks, drivers, and bearers – had been heavily involved. One officer, Lieutenant Neville Howse, of the New South Wales Army Medical Corps, received the Victoria Cross for his actions during the war; Howse eventually rose to become Director of Medical Services within the Australian Imperial Force. An earlier deployment had also occurred in 1885, when a New South Wales Contingent of infantry and artillery was deployed to assist British forces in the Sudan conflict, a small medical detachment had also been deployed.

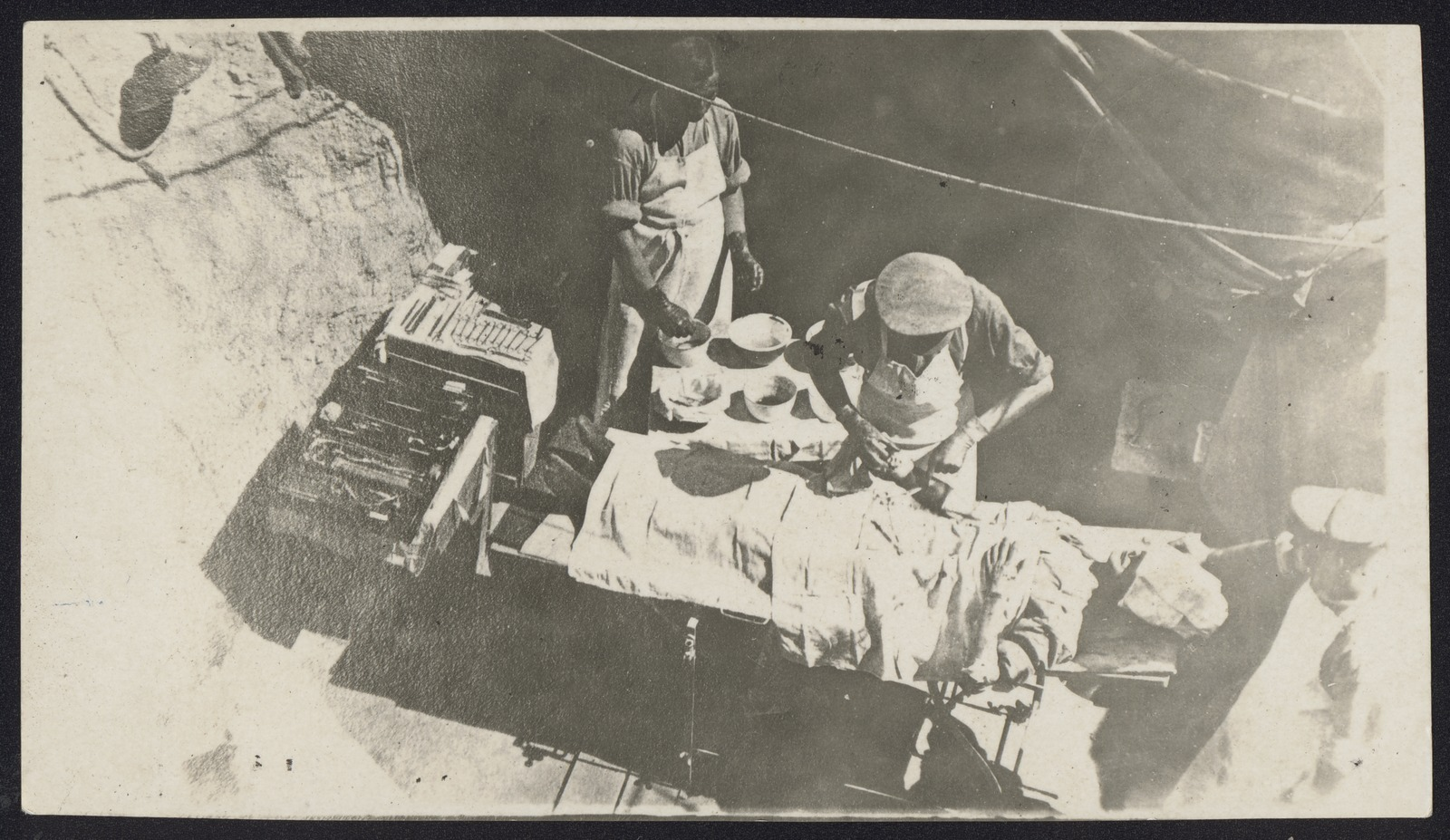
Australian Field Ambulance treating wounded soldier at Gallipoli. World War 1 1915 H84.356/26 State Library Victoria

The development of medical units within the Australian colonial forces had begun in the mid-1850s when the colonial military forces had been in their infancy. Initially, it had been limited largely to single doctors who were attached to infantry units in an honorary role, but as the colonial military forces had become more sophisticated, various medical units or corps were formed, consisting of a variety of personnel including doctors, non-commissioned officers, orderlies, bearers, and dispensers as well as cooks and drivers. Within each colony, these units were tasked with various duties including conducting medical examinations of recruits, and providing emergency medical aid during field manoeuvres; initially, they were unpaid volunteers, but eventually a system of paid part-time soldiering developed. The reliance upon part-time professionals is a common theme in the corps' development, due largely the nature of the specialised skill sets required by some personnel, particularly doctors and surgeons; however, as the corps' role has expanded, it has become a broader organisation, with personnel serving in many capacities including professional and non-professional roles including stretcher bearers, orderlies, medical assistants, pathologists, radiographers, pharmacists, drivers, physiotherapists, as well as the traditional domains of the medical officer, and in many of these areas, particularly after the Second World War there has been an expansion of the size of the corps' regular personnel, although Reservists continue to provide much of its higher clinically trained personnel.

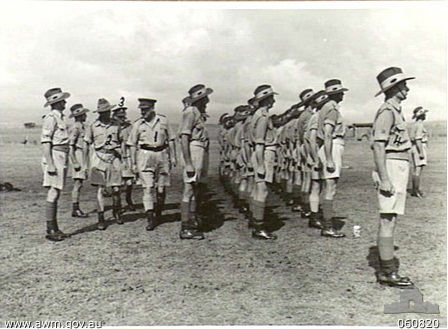
Members of the 2/12th Field Ambulance during a parade in November 1943.

Since its involvement in South Africa, the corps' role as a supporting branch of the Australian Army has expanded considerably as the importance of medicine as an enabler to successful military operations has become apparent. As a result, the corps has seen service during all major Australian Army deployments and wars since its establishment, including the First and Second World Wars, the Korean War, Vietnam, and various peacekeeping operations. During these conflicts, corps personnel have either been embedded directly into combat formations to provide medical support at the lowest level possible, or have been formed into dedicated medical units. The various types of units raised for these deployments also reflects the development of the corps. Early units raised were quite rudimentary and provided only narrowly focused capabilities, but over time increasingly sophisticated units have been raised. For instance during the First World War, the corps raised various units including: casualty clearing stations, field ambulances, stationary hospitals, general hospitals, hospital ships, sanitary sections, infections diseases hospitals, convalescent depots, and even sanatoriums. The Second World War saw similar units, but also the raising of various transport services, including trains, bacteriological and pathology laboratories, hospital laundries, administrative units and stores depots. A field ambulance unit – the 8th – was also deployed to Vietnam, as was a field hospital.

The "Royal" prefix was granted on 10 November 1948, and the day is celebrated as a corps' day. The Army School of Health was established the same year at Puckapunyal, Victoria, but it was moved to Portsea in 1950, and then later to the Army Logistic Training Centre at Latchford Barracks at Bonegilla, in 1998.

In the post-Vietnam era, RAAMC personnel have supported operational deployments to the Gulf War, Afghanistan, Iraq and peacekeeping missions in Namibia, Cambodia, Somalia, Rwanda, Bouganville and East Timor. A role 2 health facility was also deployed to Iraq in support of Task Group Taji.

== Current role ==
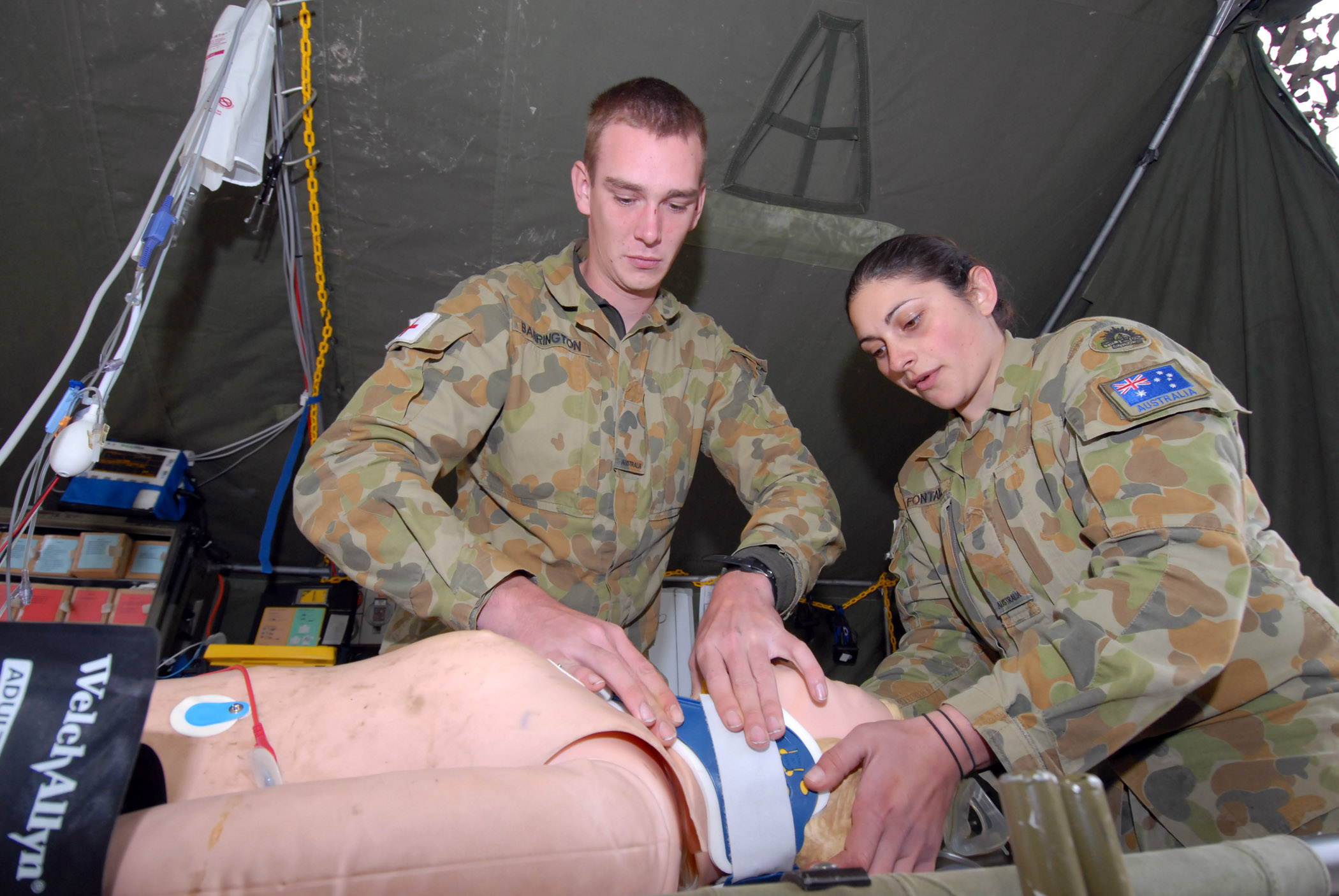
Two soldiers from the 1st Health Support Battalion during an exercise in 2007

Together with the Royal Australian Army Dental Corps and the Royal Australian Army Nursing Corps, the RAAMC is responsible for providing the Australian Army's health capability. The corps is tasked with providing the Army with a range of medical services, ranging from pre hospital care including emergency battlefield care, initial wound surgery, post operative care, rehabilitation, and preventive and aviation medical support. Regular and reserve soldiers and officers of the RAAMC perform a variety of functions, with graduates of the 18-month Regular first appointment course at the Royal Military College, Duntroon and its modularised Reserve equivalent, filling command, leadership and management roles as general service officers tasked with facilitating the efficient co-ordination, administration and management of specialist troops including medical officers, pathologists, radiographers, paramedics, combat medical attendants, preventive medicine technicians, and medical technicians. Personnel within these trades are posted to a variety of units including four multi-purpose health battalions, under the command of the 2nd Health Brigade. These units are located around the country and provide support to the three regular Army manoeuvre brigades – the 1st, 3rd and 7th Brigades – and the Reserve 2nd Division. Deployed combat formations based around infantry battalions, or armoured, artillery and engineer regiments include RAAMC personnel, who are provided by detaching individuals or small teams as required.

== Current units ==
RAAMC personnel are currently employed in the following units:

- 2nd Health Brigade
  - 1st Health Battalion: (Robertson Barracks in Darwin, Northern Territory)
  - 2nd Health Battalion: (Gallipoli Barracks in Enoggera, Queensland)
  - 3rd Health Battalion: (Keswick Barracks in Adelaide, South Australia)
  - 4th Health Battalion: (Lavarack Barracks in Townsville, Queensland)
- Army Logistic Training Centre: (Albury-Wodonga);
- Medical Centres located at Kapooka, New South Wales; Bandiana, Victoria and Canberra, Australian Capital Territory;
- Army Malaria Institute: (Enoggera, Queensland);
- Australia's Federation Guard: Canberra, Australian Capital Territory.

== Colonels-in-Chief ==
The following people have served as Colonel-in-Chief of the RAAMC:

	Name	Post-nominals	Dates	Notes
Her Majesty	Queen Elizabeth The Queen Mother	LG, LT, GCVO, GBE, RRC	1953–2002	Widow of King George VI
Major General The Hon.	Michael Jeffery	AC, CVO, MC	2007–2008	Governor General of Australia
The Hon.	Dame Quentin Bryce	AD, CVO	2008–2014	Governor General of Australia
General The Hon.	Sir Peter Cosgrove	AK, CVO, MC	2014–2019	Governor General of Australia
General The Hon.	David Hurley	AC, DSC	2019–2024	Governor General of Australia
The Hon.	Sam Mostyn	AC	2024–Present	Governor General of Australia

== Order of precedence ==
Preceded by Royal Australian Corps of Transport	Australian Army Order of Precedence	Succeeded by Royal Australian Army Dental Corps

== See also ==
- Australian Army Medical Units, World War I
- Royal Army Medical Corps
