= Exercise Talisman Sabre =

Biennial military exercise of Australia and the United States

A United States Marine (at left) and an Australian soldier working together during Exercise Talisman Saber 2013

Exercise Talisman Sabre (also spelled Talisman Saber, the US English alternative title) is a biennial, multinational military exercise led by Australia and the United States. Talisman Sabre involves joint exercises performed by the Australian Defence Force and the United States Military across six locations in northern and central Australia, the Coral Sea, and in Honolulu, Denver, and Suffolk, Va., though the bulk of the exercises are concentrated at the Shoalwater Bay Military Training Area and other locations in northern and central Australia and Australia's territorial sea and exclusive economic zone.

To reflect its bilateral nature, the leadership of the exercise switches between Australia and the US every 2 years. The exercise focuses on crisis-action planning and contingency response, enhancing both nations' military capabilities to deal with regional contingencies and the war on terrorism. The exercise is historically held in odd-numbered years starting from 2005, with the eleventh iteration taking place in 2025.

== Annual exercises ==
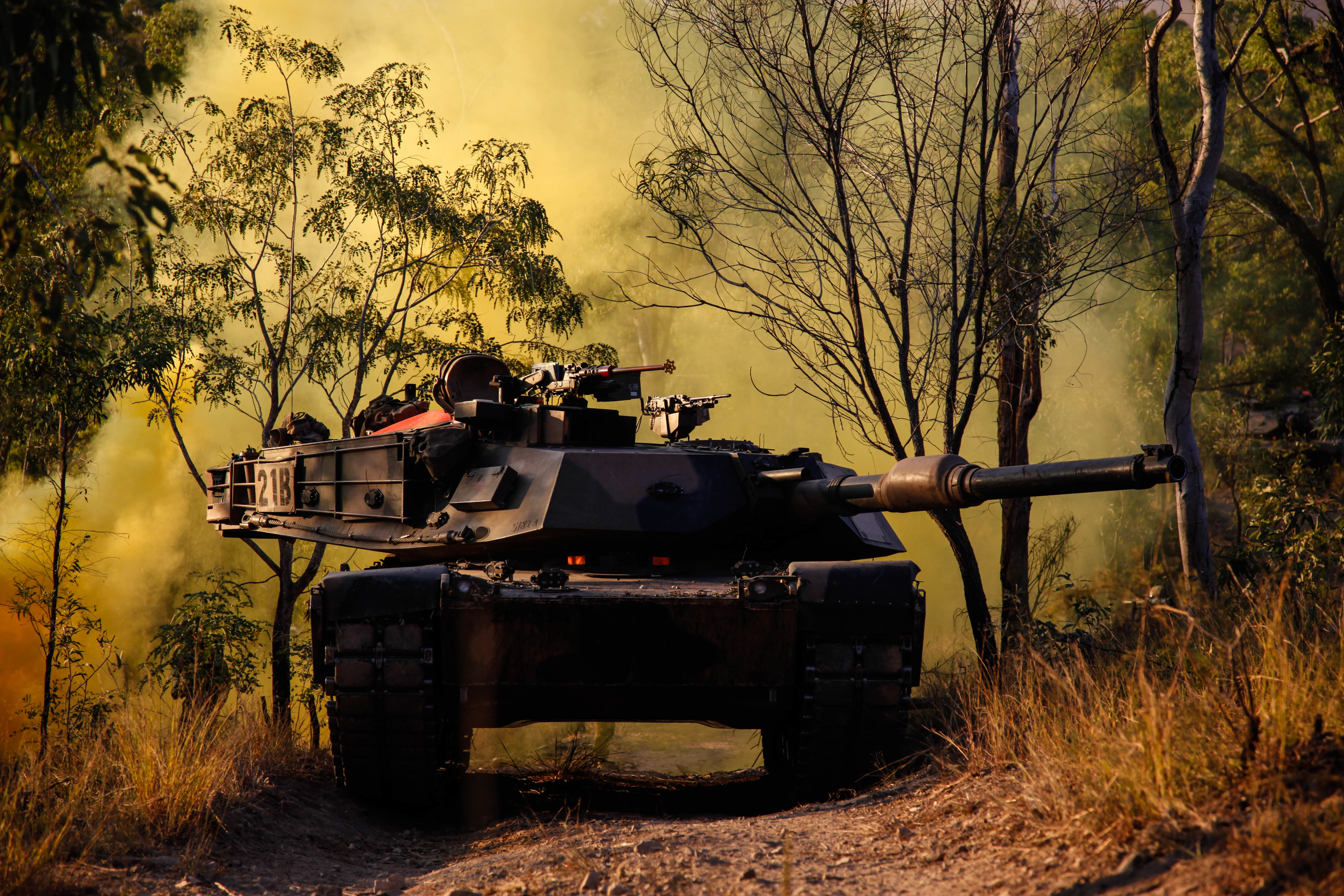
An Australian M1 Abrams tank during Exercise Talisman Sabre 2015

A US admiral describes participation in Talisman Sabre 2019

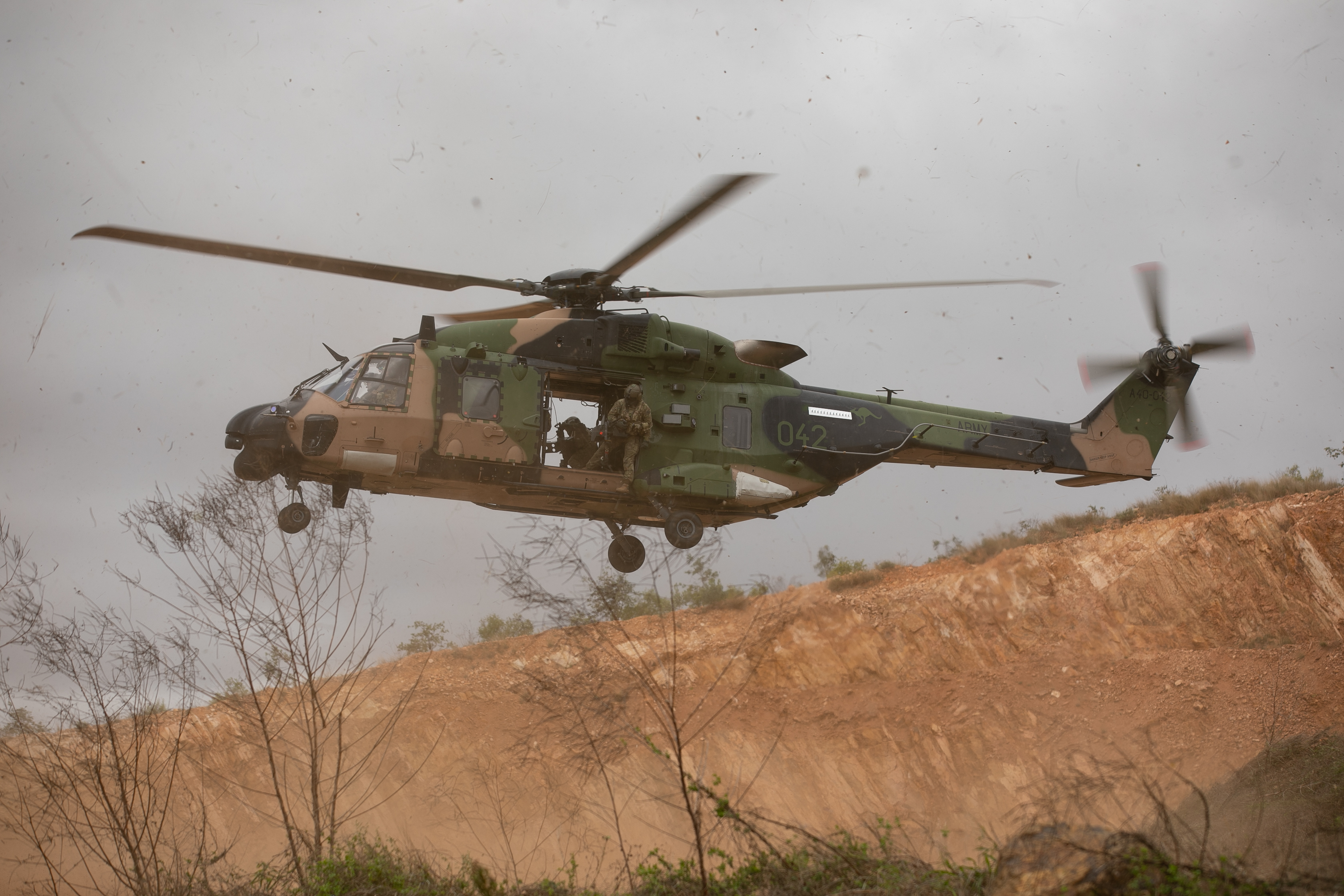
Australian MRH-90 Taipan in July 2023 on exercises for Talisman Sabre '23

- Talisman Sabre 2005 was the inaugural exercise in this series, conducted 12–27 June 2005, in Shoalwater Bay, Rockhampton, Townsville, and the Coral Sea, with 16,000 US and Australian troops. Planning for the exercises began in early 2003, and the exercise was meant to combine elements from previous exercises Tandem Thrust, Kingfisher, and Crocodile. During the exercise, US Pacific Command and Australian Defence Force Joint Operations Command jointly executed more than 25 landing craft, air cushion (LCAC) trips and more than 1,300 Australian S-70A Blackhawk and MH-60S Knight Hawk landings and takeoffs.
- Talisman Sabre 2007 involved 26,000 US and Australian troops from 10 June to 25 July. The exercise primarily took place at Shoalwater Bay, the Townsville Field Training Area, and the Bradshaw Field Training Area in central Queensland and in the Northern Territory. The exercise also involved the use of civilian airports including Sydney and Brisbane, and RAAF Base Amberley. A focal point of the exercises was a joint amphibious landing that involved the launch of more than 2,500 personnel from six ships early on 20 June.
- Talisman Sabre 2009 was conducted 6–25 July 2009, with 10,000 Australian land and naval forces and 20,000 US troops. The exercise was led by the United States and was conducted primarily at Shoalwater Bay and the Townsville Field Training Area. It involved various amphibious assault exercises and ship defense exercises.
- Talisman Sabre 2011 was conducted in July 2011 and was led by Australian forces. It incorporated "combined Special Forces operations, parachute drops, amphibious (marine) landings, land force maneuvers, urban and air operations and the coordinated firing of live ammunition."
- Talisman Sabre 2013 saw MV-22s deployed to Australia for the first time. Involved approximately 21,000 US and 7,000 AUS personnel with Carrier Strike Group Five, Expeditionary Strike Group Seven, Royal Australian Navy, Royal Australian Air Force, and the Spanish oiler Cantabria.
- Talisman Sabre 2015 was conducted over 20 days from early to mid-July 2015 and involved up to 30,000 US and Australian troops. It was the largest combined military exercise undertaken by the Australian Defence Force (ADF). Defense forces from New Zealand (500 personnel) and Japan (40 personnel) joined the exercise for the first time this year. The activities took place in the North Australian Range Complex (Bradshaw and Mount Bundy Training Areas and Delamere Air Weapons Range) and the East Australian Range Complex (Shoalwater Bay, Townsville and Cowley Beach Training Areas). A large-scale amphibious landing was also conducted at Fog Bay in the Northern Territory.
- Talisman Sabre 2017 began in June 2017 and involved more than 33,000 Australian and US troops. Alongside the USS Bonhomme Richard, 20 other ships and over 200 aircraft took part in what was the countries' largest exercise to date. Personnel from New Zealand, Japan, and Canada were embedded within Australian and United States units. Additionally, the Chinese Navy deployed a Type 815G Dongdiao-class electronic surveillance ship to monitor the exercise.
- Talisman Sabre 2019 began in July 2019, with more than 34,000 personnel participating from 18 countries, including Australia, United States, Canada, Japan and New Zealand. The Exercise was officially launched on 8 July 2019 on board USS Ronald Reagan. Once again, the Chinese Navy sent a Type 815G Dongdiao-class ship, the Tianwangxing (Uranus), to monitor the exercise, and there was speculation that China had a "keen interest" in how Japan's vessels interacted with and operated alongside the ADF and the US forces. The F-35B also made its debut in Australia during the exercise aboard USS Wasp. It was also the first time that both Canberra-class LHDs, HMAS Canberra and HMAS Adelaide, had operated together.
- Talisman Sabre 2021 was conducted starting from 14 to 31 July 2021. The exercise was modified in scope and scale, with added health protection measures due to COVID-19 considerations. More than 17,000 personnel from Australia and the United States and forces from Canada, Japan, New Zealand, the Republic of Korea and the United Kingdom, while the Australia-based personnel from India, Indonesia, France and Germany observed the exercise. Additionally, MIM-104 Patriot Systems were tested in the exercise for the first time. For what was believed to be also the first time, the Chinese Navy deployed two Type 815 spy ships to observe the exercise: the Tianwangxing and her younger sister the Haiwangxing (Neptune).
- Talisman Sabre 2023, the 10th iteration of the exercise, began on 22 July 2023 and ran until 4 August 2023. More than 30,000 personnel from 13 nations took part, including from Fiji, France, Indonesia, Japan, South Korea, New Zealand, Papua New Guinea, Tonga, the United Kingdom, Canada and Germany. The Philippines, Singapore and Thailand also attended as observers. Two Chinese Navy spy ships observed the exercise from coastal regions of the Northern Territory and Queensland. In the leadup to the exercise a truck carrying an M1 Abrams Main Battle Tank crashed on the Bruce Highway in Queensland. On the night of July 28–29 an ADF MHR-90 helicopter crashed into the ocean of the coast of the Whitsundays, with four ADF personnel onboard.
- Talisman Sabre 2025, will involve approximately 43,000 military personnel from 19 countries and an additional 3 observer countries, making it one of the largest iterations of the exercise to date. UK Carrier Strike Group 25 will be participating, with its flagship HMS Prince of Wales Norway will also be providing 7 Lockheed Martin F-35 Lightning II fighter planes and 1 Lockheed Martin C-130J Super Hercules aircraft.

== Participating countries ==
- Australia
- Canada
- Fiji
- France
- Germany
- India
- Indonesia
- Japan
- Netherlands
- New Zealand
- Norway
- Papua New Guinea
- Philippines
- South Korea
- Singapore
- Thailand
- Tonga
- United Kingdom
- United States

Observer countries:

- Brunei
- Malaysia
- Vietnam

Talisman Sabre 2025 participating naval forces
Royal Australian Navy	HMAS Canberra (landing helicopter dock); HMAS Adelaide (landing helicopter dock) (ceremonial / non-operational role); HMAS Choules (landing ship); HMAS Brisbane (destroyer); HMAS Sydney (destroyer); HMAS Farncomb (submarine); Personnel from Australian Mine Warfare Team and Maritime Geospatial Warfare Unit (USS Canley); Clearance Diving Team One
Royal Canadian Navy	HMCS Ville de Québec (frigate)
French Navy	FS Vendémiaire (frigate)
Japan Maritime Self-Defense Force	JS Ōsumi (tank landing ship); JS Ise (helicopter destroyer); JS Sazanami (destroyer); JS Suzunami; JS Akebono (destroyer); JS Yahagi (frigate); Unidentified Japanese submarine (submarine); JS Suzunami (destroyer)
Royal New Zealand Navy	HMNZS Canterbury (multi-role); HMNZS Te Kaha (frigate); At-sea (MCM) team (on USS Canley)
Royal Norwegian Navy	HNoMS Roald Amundsen (frigate)
Republic of Korea Navy	ROKS Marado (amphibious assault ship); ROKS Chungmugong Yi Sun-sin (destroyer); ROKS Wang Geon (destroyer)
Spanish Navy	ESPS Méndez Núñez (frigate)
Royal Navy	HMS Prince of Wales (aircraft carrier); HMS Dauntless (destroyer); HMS Richmond (frigate); HMS Astute (submarine); RFA Tidespring (fleet oiler)
United States Navy	USS George Washington (aircraft carrier); USS America (amphibious assault ship); USS San Diego (amphibious transport dock); USS Rushmore (dock landing ship); USS John L. Canley (expeditionary support base); USS Robert Smalls (cruiser); USS Shoup (destroyer); USS Higgins (destroyer); USNS Rappahannock (underway replenishment); EOD Mobile Unit 5 (on Canley)

Talisman Sabre 2025 participating air forces
Royal Australian Air Force	1SQN - F/A-18F 2SQN - E-7A 6SQN - EA-18G 13SQN - Base Support Operations 23SQN - Base Support Operations 33SQN - KC-30A MRTT 35SQN - C-27J 36SQN - C-17A 37SQN - C-130J 75SQN - F-35A 77SQN - F-35A
Royal Australian Navy/Australian Army	725 Squadron RAN + other unknown FAA Squadrons - MH-60R 16th Aviation Brigade (Australia): 1st Aviation Regiment (Australia) - Tiger ARH; 5th Aviation Regiment (Australia) - CH-47F
Royal Canadian Air Force	412 Transport Squadron - Canadair CC-144 Challenger 429 Transport Squadron - CC-177 436 Transport Squadron - CC-130J-30
French Air and Space Force	A330 MRTT
German Air Force	Air Transport Wing 62 - A400M
Japan Air Self-Defense Force	CH-47J 403rd Tactical Airlift Squadron (JASDF) - Kawasaki C-2
Republic of Korea Marine Corps	MUH-1
Royal New Zealand Air Force	No. 3 Squadron RNZAF - NH90 No. 5 Squadron RNZAF - P-8A No. 40 Squadron RNZAF - Boeing 757
Royal Norwegian Air Force	F-35A 335 Squadron RNoAF - C-130J
Papua New Guinea Armed Forces	Air Element - Bell 212
Royal Air Force/Royal Navy	Voyager KC.2 and KC.3 HMS Prince of Wales / UK Carrier Strike Group 25: 617 Squadron - F-35B; 809 Squadron - F-35B; EH101 Merlin
United States Air Force/United States Army	62nd Airlift Wing/446th Airlift Wing - C-17 154th Air Expeditionary Wing: 199th Fighter Squadron - F-22; 203rd Air Refueling Squadron - KC-135R; 437th Airlift Wing: Unknown squadron/s within 437th - C-17; 437th Aircraft Maintenance Squadron; 437th Maintenance Squadron; RC-135W 6th Air Refueling Squadron - KC-46 160th SOAR - MH-47G, MH-60M 535th Airlift Squadron
United States Navy/United States Marine Corps	America ARG: VMFA-242 - F-35B; VMM-262 - CH-53E; VMM-265 - MV-22B/UH-1Y/AH-1Z; HSC-25 - MH-60S; Carrier Air Wing 5: VFA-27 - F/A-18E; VFA-102 - F/A-18F; VFA-147 - F-35C; VFA-195 - F/A-18E; VAQ-141 - EA-18G; VAW-125 - E-2D; HSC-12 - MH-60S; HSM-77 - MH-60R; Marine Rotational Force - Darwin: VMM-363 - MV-22B; VMGR-152 - KC-130J
Source/s	If a source is not given, the information comes from public imaging released on , or .

Talisman Sabre 2025 participating ground forces
Australian Army	1st Division (Australia): Amphibious Task Group One (ATG-1); 2nd Battalion, Royal Australian Regiment; Additional Republic of Korea Marine Corps, Japan Ground Self-Defense Force, United States Marine Corps, United States Army, New Zealand Army and French Army personnel attached; Elements of 1 RAR; 1st Brigade (Australia); 5th/7th Battalion, Royal Australian Regiment; 8th/12th Regiment, Royal Australian Artillery; 1st Combat Engineer Regiment (Australia); 3rd Brigade (Australia); 1st Battalion, Royal Australian Regiment; 3rd Battalion, Royal Australian Regiment; 2nd Cavalry Regiment (Australia); 3rd Combat Engineer Regiment (Australia); 7th Brigade (Australia); 2nd/14th Light Horse Regiment; 8th/9th Battalion, Royal Australian Regiment; NZ Army Combat Team – Combat Team Wolfpack; 2nd Combat Engineer Regiment (Australia); 10th Fires Brigade; 14th Regiment, Royal Australian Artillery - 4 M142 HIMARS; 16th Regiment, Royal Australian Artillery - NASAMS III; 17th Sustainment Brigade (Australia); 9th Force Support Battalion (Australia); 10th Force Support Battalion (Australia); 6th Engineer Support Regiment (Australia); 1st Signal Regiment; 2nd Division (Australia): 4th Brigade (Australia); 4th/19th Prince of Wales's Light Horse; 12th/40th Battalion, Royal Tasmanian Regiment; 5th/6th Battalion, Royal Victoria Regiment; 8th/7th Battalion, Royal Victoria Regiment; 22nd Engineer Regiment (Australia); 5th Brigade (Australia); 1st/15th Royal New South Wales Lancers; 41st Battalion, Royal New South Wales Regiment; 5th Engineer Regiment (Australia); 9th Brigade (Australia); 1st Armoured Regiment; 8th Operational Support Unit; Forces Command: 1st Health Battalion (Australia); 2nd Health Battalion (Australia); 3rd Health Battalion (Australia); 16th Aviation Brigade (Australia): 20th Regiment, Royal Australian Artillery - UAVs; Personnel from Special Operations Command.
Royal Australian Air Force	No. 4 Squadron RAAF JTACs
Canadian Army	Cyber personnel
French Army	21st Marine Infantry Regiment
Fiji Infantry Regiment	Unspecified personnel
German Army	26th Regiment Fallschirmjager
Indonesian Air Force	KOPASGAT JTACs
Japan Ground Self-Defense Force	第2特科団 (2nd Artillery Brigade) - Type 12 Surface-to-Ship Missile
Republic of Korea Army/Republic of Korea Marine Corps	K1A2 MBTs and K9 SPH Airbourne and amphibious infantry
Singapore Army	M142 HIMARS
Netherlands Marine Corps	Contingent of Marines training jointly with the U.S. Marine Corps and Royal Marines.
New Zealand Army	16th Field Regiment (New Zealand) - UAVs NZ Army Combat Team – Combat Team Wolfpack (Attached to 8/9 RAR, containing elements of): Queen Alexandra's Mounted Rifles; 2nd Engineer Regiment (New Zealand); 1st Battalion, Royal New Zealand Infantry Regiment; Cyber personnel
British Army/Royal Marines	Royal Gurkha Rifles 42 Commando, Royal Marines
United States Army/United States Marine Corps/United States Navy	Marine Rotational Force - Darwin: 2nd Battalion 1st Marines; Combat Logistics Battalion 1 (TRV-150C UAS; 1st Battalion, 3rd Field Artillery Regiment - M142 HIMARS, M777 2nd Infantry Brigade Combat Team (Airborne), 11th Airborne Division 31st Marine Expeditionary Unit: Combat Logistics Battalion 31; 8th Theater Sustainment Command: 8th Military Police Brigade; 728th Military Police Battalion; 377th Theater Sustainment Command 5th Transportation Company US Naval Special Warfare operators 94th Army Air and Missile Defence Command
Tongan Land Force	Unspecified marine forces
Source/s	If a source is not given, the information comes from public imaging released on , or . It is only directly referenced/mentioned units that are listed in the ORBAT.

== Protests and response ==
The exercise was the target of protests in 2013 and 2015.

Prior to the 2005 exercise, in response to media reports that depleted uranium might be used, the Australian Department of Defence released a press statement in which it said the substance "will not be used in TS05 by either Australian or US forces" and that this was "unequivocal". This commitment was reiterated prior to Talisman Sabre 2009.

== See also ==
- Exercise Kangaroo
