= William James (Australian general) =

Soldier and military doctor (1930–2015)

William James AC, AO (Mil), MBE, MC, FRACS
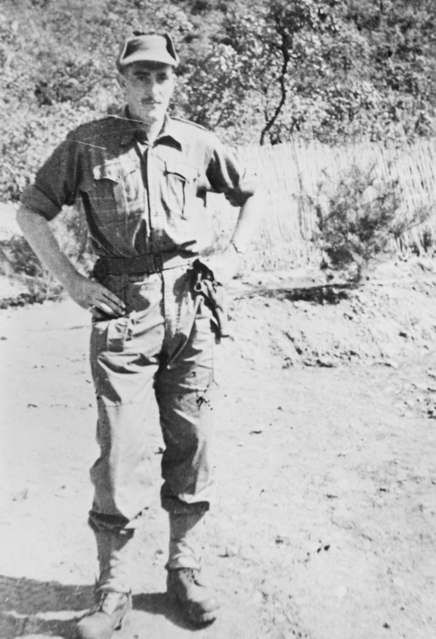
- Lieutenant William James in November 1952, during the Korean War
- Born: 14 May 1930; Shepparton, Victoria
- Died: 16 October 2015 (aged 85); Brisbane, Queensland
- Military career
- Allegiance: Australia
- Branch: Australian Army
- Service years: 1948–1984
- Rank: Major General
- Nickname: Digger
- Units: 1st Battalion, Royal Australian Regiment; Royal Australian Armoured Corps
- Commands: 8th Field Ambulance
- Conflicts: Korean War; Vietnam War
- Awards: Companion of the Order of Australia; Officer of the Order of Australia (Military); Member of the Order of the British Empire; Military Cross; Officer of the Order of St John
- Other work: National President of the RSL (1993–97)

William Brian "Digger" James (14 May 1930 – 16 October 2015) was an Australian soldier and military physician who served in the Australian Army during the Korean War and the Vietnam War.

== Early life ==
William James was born in May 1930 in Shepparton, the son of Thomas James, a local orchardist who had emigrated from Ireland. He was educated at Grahamvale State School and Shepparton High School. His lifelong nickname "Digger" pre-dated his military career, having been applied when someone placed a slouch hat on his head at the age of ten months.

== Military and medical career ==
=== Duntroon training ===
At the completion of his schooling, James attended the Royal Military College, Duntroon, from which he graduated in 1951.

=== Korean War ===
Posted to the 1st Battalion, Royal Australian Regiment (1RAR), in 1952 James served as a platoon commander during the Korean War. On 7 November, during the Second Battle of Maryang San (Hill 355), he led a patrol of twelve men to capture an enemy outpost. The group inadvertently entered a Canadian minefield, resulting in the death of one soldier and four injuries, including the loss of James's left foot. Using a shoelace as a torniquet, James then organised the evacuation of his men from the battlefield, radioing for help and waiting three hours before being evacuated himself due to a shortage of stretchers.

He underwent surgery at an American MASH unit in Korea, before being flown to Kure, Japan where he spent four months being treated at the British Commonwealth General Hospital. In late December, he was repatriated to Australia where he spent fourteen months in recovery at the Royal General Hospital, Heidelberg.

On 3 March 1953, James was awarded the Military Cross for gallant and distinguished service in Korea due to his actions that day. The citation for his MC read:

The example set by Lieutenant James and his leadership, devotion to duty, self-sacrifice and extreme fortitude when in great personal distress was an inspiration to members of his battalion.

=== Medical training ===
Upon his release from hospital, James transferred to the Royal Australian Armoured Corps. He was posted to a training regiment at the School of Armour, serving as the regiment's adjutant before taking up a position as cadre staff in the 12th/16th Hunter River Lancers, a reserve cavalry regiment, based at Muswellbrook.

His experiences in military medical facilities sparked an interest in the field, and in 1957, James left the Army to study medicine at the Sydney Medical School, from which he graduated in 1963 with a Bachelor of Medicine and a Bachelor of Surgery (MBBS). After serving his hospital residency, James rejoined the Army as a medical officer for the Royal Australian Army Medical Corps (RAAMC).

=== Vietnam War ===
Promoted to major, James was posted to command the 8th Field Ambulance in South Vietnam during the Vietnam War from January 1968 to January 1969. He also served as senior medical officer for the 1st Australian Task Force in Nui Dat over the same period. He used his personal experience as a wounded soldier in Korea to inspire and encourage other patients, particularly those injured by land mines.

In April 1969 he became a Member of the Order of the British Empire (MBE) in the military division for his Vietnam service.

=== Post-war service ===
In 1971, James served with a British St John's Ambulance medical relief team during the aftermath of the Biafran Civil War in Nigeria, for which he became and Officer of the Order of Saint John.

Returning to Australia, James was appointed Queensland state director of Army Medical Services from 1971 to 1975, then AMS director at Army Headquarters from 1975 to 1981. In 1981, he was promoted to major general, and served as director-general of Army Health Services until his retirement from the army in 1984.

== After retirement ==
From 1993 to 1997, James was National President of the Returned Services League (RSL). From 1993 to 2000, he sat on the council of the Australian War Memorial, serving as the council's president from 1999 to 2000. He was also chairman of the Australian Light Horse Association, and his face was used as the model for one of the soldiers on the Light Horse memorial in Beersheba, Israel which he unveiled in 2008, and was funded by his childhood friend, Richard Pratt.

An avowed monarchist, James was a member of Australians for Constitutional Monarchy (ACM), and a delegate to the Australian Constitutional Convention 1998.

== Personal life ==
James died on 16 October 2015. He was married for more than 60 years to Barbara, with whom he had four children.

== Honours and awards ==

	Companion of the Order of Australia (AC)	1998 Australia Day Honours
	Officer of the Order of Australia (military) (AO [Mil])	1985 Queen's Birthday Honours
	Member of the Order of the British Empire (military) (MBE [Mil])	ANZAC Day 1969
	Military Cross (MC)	3 March 1953
	Officer of the Order of Saint John	1971
	Australian Active Service Medal 1945–1975	with clasps Korea and Vietnam
	Korea Medal	
	United Nations Service Medal for Korea	
	Vietnam Medal	
	Defence Force Service Medal	
	National Medal (Australia)	25 February 1980
	Australian Defence Medal	
	Vietnam Campaign Medal	Republic of Vietnam
	Infantry Combat Badge	
Royal Cypher of Queen Elizabeth II all in gold. This form of the cypher is used on applicable uniforms by designated personnel holding appointments to the Queen or her Vice Regal representatives, e.g. Aides de Camp to the Queen, Honorary Physicians to the Queen, etc.	Honorary Physician to the Queen (QHP)	
