= Showground railway station =

Showground or Showgrounds railway station may refer to:

== Australia ==
- Adelaide Showground railway station, current station in Adelaide
- Hills Showground railway station, a Sydney Metro station
- Showground Central railway station, former station in Adelaide that served Adelaide Showground
- Showgrounds railway station, Melbourne, serves the Melbourne Showground
- Showgrounds railway station, Perth, serves the Claremont Showgrounds
