= 3rd Health Battalion =

Medical unit of the Australian Army

- Active: 1960 – 2022 (As 3rd Health Support Battalion); 2022 – Present
- Country: Australia
- Branch: Army Reserve
- Type: Combat health support
- Size: One battalion
- Part of: 2nd Brigade (Australia)
- Garrison/HQ: Keswick Barracks
- Mottos: "Promoting Health, Providing Care"

Insignia
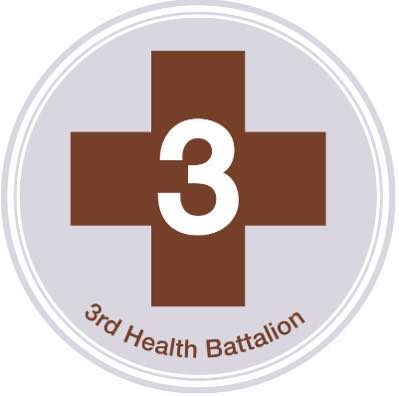
- Unit public Logo

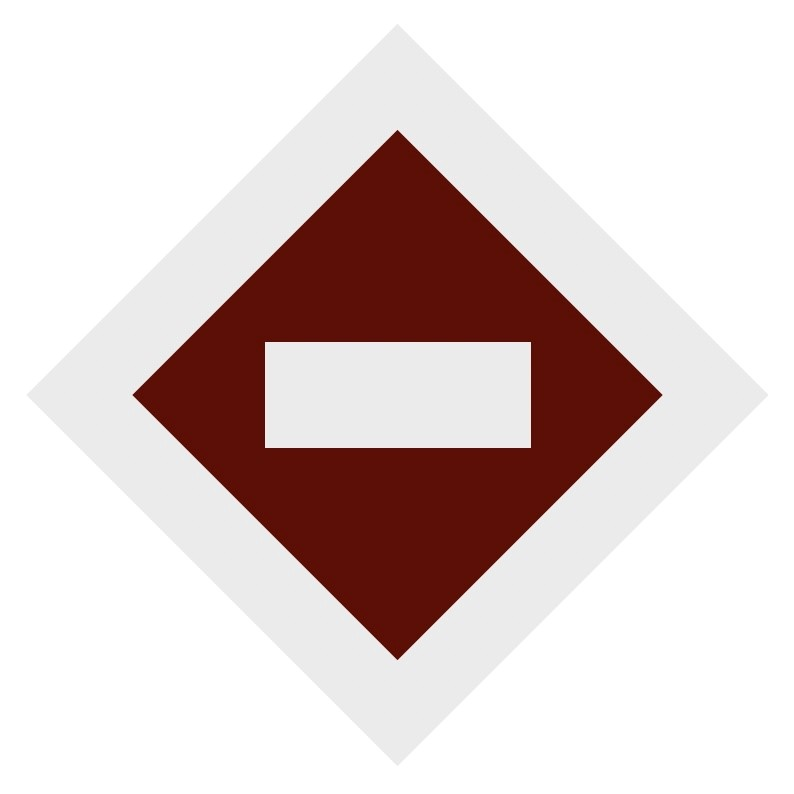
- Identification symbol
- Identification symbol: Colour Patch of the 3rd Health Battalion

The 3rd Health Battalion (3 HB) is an Australian Army unit headquartered in Adelaide, South Australia, foundered after the establishment of the 2nd Brigade (Australia) in 2022, providing Close Health, General Health and Health Support services to southern brigades and units of the Australian Army. Drawing its lineage from the 3rd Australian General Hospital, which was raised for service during World War I, the unit was tasked with providing Role 2 health support to troops deployed overseas on operations and within Australia on exercise and provided medical personnel for a variety deployments in the post-war period, including those to Rwanda, Bougainville, East Timor, Iraq and Afghanistan.

In February 2022, following the disbandment of 3 HSB as part of the Army's restructure of its health battalions, four new health battalions were formed that were to be placed under the command of the 2nd Health Brigade.

== Structure and Role ==
Consisting of four health support companies – the 1st, 2nd, 3rd and 6th – the unit was headquartered at Keswick Barracks in Adelaide with sub-units and elements in Melbourne, Hobart, Sydney and Adelaide. The unit formed part of the 17th Sustainment Brigade.

While it was designated primarily as a Reserve unit, 3 HSB had a small cadre of Regular Army personnel who were tasked with administration and training. Personnel belong to a variety of corps, including the Royal Australian Army Medical Corps, the Royal Australian Army Nursing Corps, the Royal Australian Army Dental Corps, and other logistical corps. It was generally used to provide individual reinforcements to the Army's other two health battalions – the 1st Close and 2nd General Health Battalions – and was tasked with providing health support at Role 2 and above, including initial wound and definitive surgical interventions, and maintains the majority of the Australian Army's high level surgical capabilities.

== History ==
The unit traces its lineage back to the 3rd Australian General Hospital (3 AGH) that was established during the early years of World War I. During the Gallipoli Campaign, 3 AGH served on Lemnos Island before moving to Egypt in January 1916, having treated 7,400 patients. In mid-1916, the unit moved to Brighton in the United Kingdom as part of the transfer of the Australian Imperial Force to the Western Front. It was later moved across the English Channel to France, where it was established around Abbeville, remaining there until it was demobilised in 1919.

In 1960, the 104st Military Hospital, formed in World War 2 and based at Keswick Barracks, was re-designated as 3rd General Hospital (3 GH). In 1965, 3 GH became a training hospital. In 1983, 3 GH became a separate unit. In 1989, 3 GH was renamed 3rd Forward General Hospital (3 FGH). On 17 December 1997, 3 FGH was placed under the command of Headquarters Logistic Support Force (now 17th Sustainment Brigade). On 9 October 2000, 3 FGH was renamed 3rd Health Support Battalion (3 HSB).

The unit deployed personnel on various overseas deployments, mostly through rounding out Regular medical units. It provided individual personnel to deployments to Vietnam, Rwanda, Bougainville, Iraq and Afghanistan and provided the majority of the personnel assigned to the fourth rotation of the UNMILHOSP force sent to East Timor in 2001.
