= 1st Health Battalion =

Battalion of the Australian Army

- Callsign Vampire logo used by 1 HB
- Active: 1 April 1968 – 2022 (Under different names); 2022-Present (As 1st Health Battalion)
- Country: Australia
- Allegiance: Australian Army, Commonwealth of Australia
- Branch: Army
- Type: Combat Health Support
- Role: Medical and Logistical
- Size: One battalion
- Part of: 2nd Health Brigade
- Garrison/HQ: Robertson Barracks, Darwin
- Colors: Green
- Mascot: Vampire Bat
- Anniversaries: 1 April
- Equipment: Australian Bushmaster

Insignia
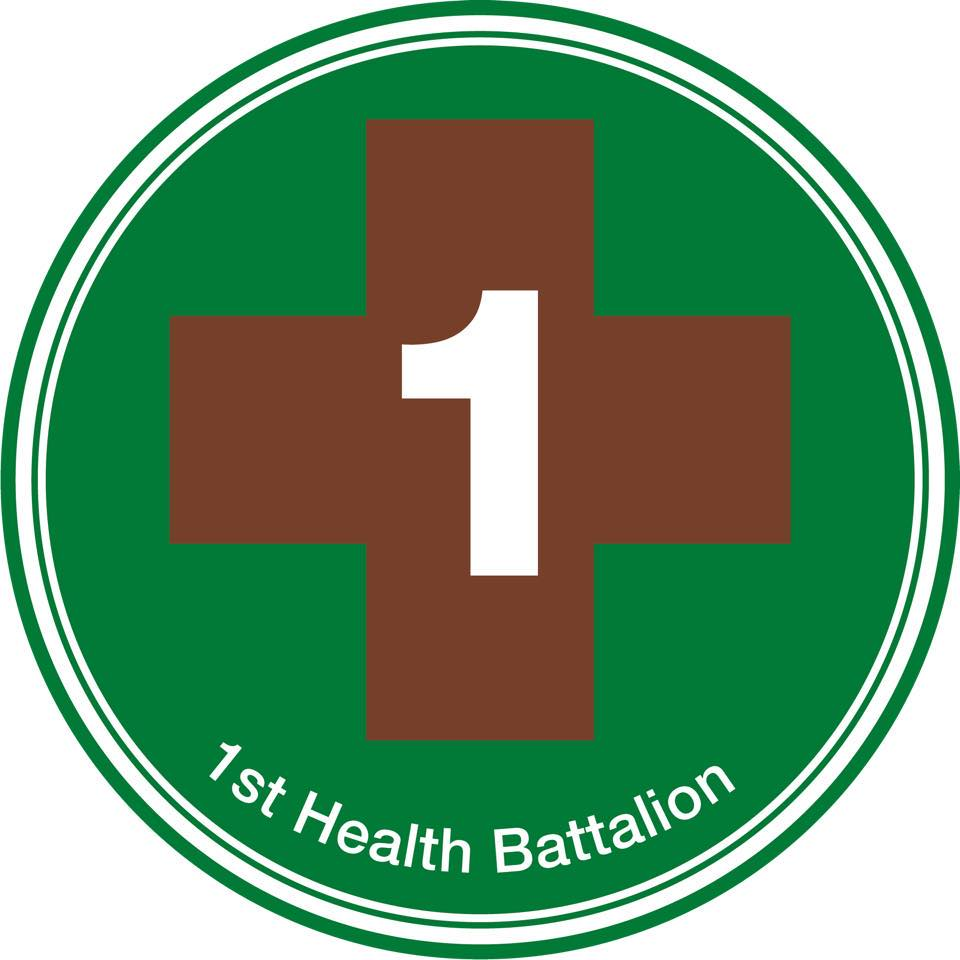
- Unit Logo: Public Logo of the 1st Health Battalion - Darwin

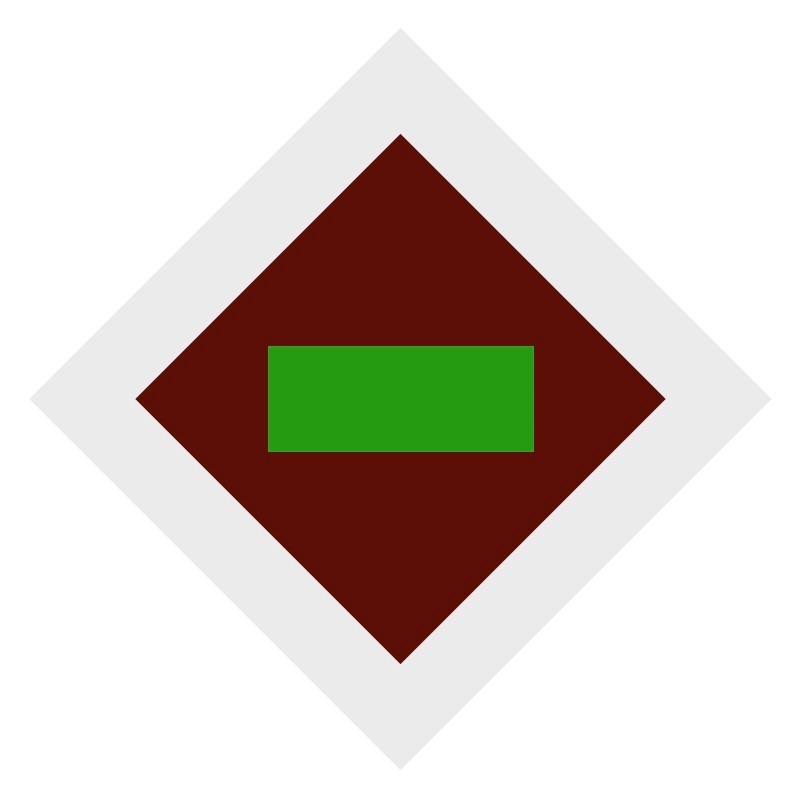
- Unit Colour Patch: Colour Identification Patch of the 1st Health Battalion - Darwin

The 1st Health Battalion (1 HB) is a unit of the 2nd Health Brigade. It is headquartered at the Robertson Army Barracks in Darwin. Formally having sub-units located in Darwin, Townsville and Brisbane, the then 1st Close Health Battalion (1CHB) was raised as 1 HB and fell under the command of the reestablished 2nd Health Brigade in 2022; with the existing Sub-Units being absorbed into 4th Health Battalion (Australia), and 2nd Health Battalion (Australia), respectively. Additionally, a Close Health Unit was founded under the command of the 3rd Health Battalion (Australia), cementing the new capabilities of Joint Health.

The unit traces its lineage back to the 1st Field Hospital, which was raised in the 1960s for service as part of Australia's contribution to the Vietnam War. Since then, the unit has changed names twice and personnel have been deployed on numerous peacekeeping and warlike operations throughout Africa, the Middle East and the Asia-Pacific region.

In February 2022, following the disbandment of 1CHB as part of the Army's restructure of its health battalions, four new health battalions were formed that were to be placed under the command of the 2nd Health Brigade. 1CHB lives on through the newly formed 1st Health Battalion (1HB) that has retained their bat symbol.

In 2024, the unit consists of 3 Companies- 8 Close Health Company, and Operational Support Company colocated with the Battalion Headquarters in Darwin and 7 Health Support Company Based in Perth. Additional detachments of 1 HB personnel support NORFORCE in Darwin and the Pilbara Regiment in Karratha.

== Role ==
When the unit was first formed as a field hospital during the Vietnam War, it was organised as a "Level 3" (now described as "Role 3") health facility, tasked with provision of initial wound surgery (surgical resuscitation) for combat casualties and medium to high intensity nursing care in the area of operations, as well as a definitive diagnosis of the casualty's condition. Following the reorganisation of the Australian Army's health assets in late 2011, these functions were vested in the 2nd General Health and 3rd Health Support Battalions, and 1 CHB took over responsibility for provision of Role 1 and integrated medical support that was previously vested within the health companies that existed in the multi-functional combat service support battalions.

1CHB provided close health support to deployed land force elements through the provision of Role 1 medical support. This entails forward positioning of assets within a battlespace to provide a number of close health effects, "including collection from [point of injury], resuscitation, stabilisation and evacuation, and emergency diagnostics". The unit focused primarily upon the following key tasks: "primary health care, first aid, triage, resuscitation, stabilization, evacuation, on-route care, casualty staging, ... [and] ... patient holding". In addition, the battalion could also provide limited rehabilitation and reconditioning services to deployed forces, and was responsible for management of combat medical supplies, and provided uniformed personnel to support civilian health personnel within garrison medical facilities.

== Raising the unit ==
1HB’s historical roots date back to Australia's involvement in the Vietnam War. In April 1966, during the Vietnam War the 2nd Field Ambulance was raised at Vung Tau. A year later, 8th Field Ambulance took over from 2nd Field Ambulance. Another year on, 1 April 1968, 1st Australian Field Hospital was raised and took over the Australian military hospital at Vung Tau from 8th Field Ambulance.

In December 1971, the unit returned to Australia and was located at Manunda Lines, Ingleburn in New South Wales. At this time, the unit name was changed to the 1st Field Hospital. The 1st Field Hospital was relocated to a purpose built medical facility at Holsworthy Army Barracks in Sydney, in January 1996. On 16 August 2000, the 1st Field Hospital was re-designated as the 1st Health Support Battalion (1HSB).

In November 2011, the unit was re-roled as part of a restructuring of Army health units. It was subsequently renamed the 1st Close Health Battalion, subsuming the health companies previously forming part of the combat service support battalions within the 1st, 3rd and 7th Brigades based in Darwin, Townsville and Brisbane. These companies were redesignated as the 2nd, 8th and 11th Close Health Companies, perpetuating the designations of various field ambulances that had service histories dating back to the First World War. The unit's headquarters was in Sydney, but they began moving to Robertson Barracks, in Darwin, in late 2018.

== Call Sign Vampire ==
Original fighting bat logo used at Vung Tau

Radio operators in Vietnam allocated the Call Sign "Vampire" to all the Australian medical units at the Vung Tau base: 2nd Field Ambulance, 8th Field Ambulance and the 1st Australian Field Hospital. This resulted in the adoption of the fighting bat logo, which was originally used by the 2nd Field Ambulance. This was a different logo that which is currently used by 1 CHB. The current design of the bat logo was the result of a competition organised by the Commanding Officer of the 1st Field Hospital, then Lieutenant Colonel (later Major General) David Rossi, during 1977–1979. The criteria stipulated for the design was that it should be easily identified by the unit, involve the use of the Call Sign Vampire and represent a distinguishable piece of history from which to build upon.

When 1CHB disbanded in 2021 the Bat symbol was inherited by the 1st Health Battalion (1HB) which caused some contention as the 2nd Field Ambulance (2FA) created the original design and a medic of the 2nd Close Health Company designed the latest iteration. Most members felt by right, the bat symbol belonged with the newly established 4HB who carried on 2FA's memory with its spiritual successor, 2CHC however this decision was quickly disregarded in favour of 1HB retaining the Vampire Bat.

== Operational history ==
=== Vietnam War (1966–1971) ===
Between April and June 1966, the 1st Australian Logistic Support Group (1ALSG) set up a logistics base on the coast of Vung Tau in Vietnam. This base was to support the 1st Australian Task Force (1ATF), who had set up an operational base at Nui Dat, approximately 20 miles inland from Vung Tau in the centre of Phuoc Tuy Province, south-east of Saigon.

At the logistics base at Vung Tau, a restricted Field Ambulance was set up comprising half a stretcher bearer company and a 50-bed hospital. It was raised on 1 April 1966 and known as the 2nd Field Ambulance. An Australian medical unit was now at war for the first time since 1945. The unit had approximately 100 personnel, a mixture of regular and conscripted soldiers. Prior to the raising of the 2nd Field Ambulance, medical support for the Australian troops was provided by the Americans.

In February 1967, mass casualties arrived at the hospital from three different incidents almost simultaneously. This exposed the limitations of the hospital's operating theatre with three operating tables in a single Kingstrand hut. The modern weapons used during the Vietnam War were producing severe, multiple contaminated wounds with massive tissue damage, much greater than had ever been experienced by Australian Army clinicians. Surgery was often performed at the same time as the initial resuscitation efforts.

On 1 April 1967, the 2nd Field Ambulance at Vung Tau was taken over by the 8th Field Ambulance. It was located in two areas with the main hospital element at the Vung Tau base and a detached forward company at Nui Dat. 171 battle casualties were admitted to the hospital over a period of six months (4 September 1967 to 3 March 1968). There was only one fatality during this period, but most severely injured soldiers with poor prognosis were treated at 36 Evacuation Hospital, the major United States medical facility in Vung Tau. As Australia's military commitment to Vietnam increased, so did the medical services supporting it. On 1 April 1968 the 1st Australian Field Hospital (1 Aust FD Hosp) was raised. The word "Australian" was used in the unit name so as to differentiate it from the American Field Hospital. This unit became the main Australian medical unit in Vietnam. On the raising of the 1 Aust FD Hosp, 8th Field Ambulance moved to Nui Dat where it had already established a forward company.

Australian casualties being evacuated to the 8th Field Ambulance at Nui Dat during the Battle of Suoi Chau Pha.

The Australian military hospital at Vung Tau expanded from 50 beds to 106 beds, including a 50-bed surgical ward, a 50-bed medical war and a 6-bed Intensive Care Unit (ICU).The hospital was fully functional with the necessary military hospital facilities and services including triage which could take up to six simultaneous casualties and could expand to 16 if necessary, Operating theatres with three operating tables, pathology, x-ray, dental, pharmacy, Regimental Aid Post (RAP), physiotherapy, and psychiatry. These services were supported by a Q Store, an orderly room, administration, messes and accommodation.

Personnel of 1 Aust FD Hosp consisted of regular and conscripted soldiers from the Royal Australian Army Medical Corps (RAAMC), Royal Australian Army Nursing Corps (RAANC), Royal New Zealand Nursing Corps (RNZNC), transport drivers of the Royal Australian Army Service Corps now known as Royal Australian Corps of Transport, Chaplains Department and the Catering Corps. The surgical capacity was maintained by the Citizens Military Force (CMF) specialists from the Australian Army, Navy and Air Force, today known as Reserves, plus civilian specialists who undertook three-month tours. General Medical Officers were made up mainly of Australian Regular Army (ARA) and CMF full-time commissions. Also attached to the site were 33 Dental Unit, 1 Field Medical & Dental, 1 Field Hygiene Coy and a unit of the Red Cross. Most permanent medical personnel served in country for 12 months.

An increase in use of fragmentation weapons such as rocket-propelled grenades and mines resulted in a doubling of battle casualties from March to August 1969 compared with the previous six months with battle casualties accounting for 33.1% of all admissions in 1969. In October 1969, 36 Evacuation Hospital closed, requiring the surgical facilities of 1 Aust FD Hosp to cope with all casualties, including severe injuries previously treated by the US facility. As history has shown in most military conflicts, disease cases in the Vietnam War outnumbered battle casualties. Other presentations to 1 Aust FD Hosp included cases of malaria, scrub typhus and sexually transmitted diseases.

The high standard of para-medical services provided by 1 Aust FD Hosp was such that nearly 99% on patients who reached the hospital alive survived their injury or illness. This is a remarkable achievement, given that many of the casualties arrived at the hospital barely clinging to life with severe injuries. The use of medical evacuation ("Dustoff") helicopters enabled a soldier to be receive emergency treatment at the hospital within thirty minutes of being wounded or injured in the field. This was only possible due to the air superiority of the helicopters, which allowed mostly unimpeded, rapid access to combat zones.

Australia's combat role in Vietnam ended on 7 November 1971 with the withdrawal of most of the 4th Battalion, Royal Australian Regiment (4RAR) from Nui Dat. On 25 November, most of the medical personnel were withdrawn from 1 Aust FD Hosp. The hospital remained in operation until December 1971 when the bulk of Australian grounds forces returned to Australia. Meanwhile, the 8th Field Ambulance had reopened at Vung Tau on 20 November to support the residual Australian force that remained there, until it too was withdrawn to Australia in late February 1972.

From the time of the arrival of the first Australian military members in 1962, some 50,000 Australians, including ground troops and air force and navy personnel, served in Vietnam. 520 died as a result of the war and almost 2,400 were wounded.

The numbers of personnel serving in the medical units at Vung Tau were:

- 26 personnel served with 2nd Field Ambulance (1 April 1966 – 1 April 1967);
- 196 personnel served with 8th Field Ambulance (1 April 1967 – 1 April 1968);
- 651 personnel served with 1st Australian Field Hospital (1 April 1968 to the end of the war).

Personnel deployed to Vietnam received the Vietnam Medal for recognition of service in the Vietnam War and the Australian Active Service Medal 1945–1975 for recognition of service in a warlike operation.

=== Namibia (1989–1990) ===
1 FD Hosp health service personnel were deployed to the then South West Africa in April 1989 until March 1990 as part of the Australian contingent of the United Nations Transition Assistance Group (UNTAG). UNTAG was deployed as a United Nations peacekeeping force to monitor the peace process, and ensure free and fair elections leading to Namibia's independence, and the ending of South Africa's occupation. The Australian contingent was largely made up of engineers from the 17th Construction Squadron.

Australian military personnel deployed to Namibia were awarded the Australian Service Medal (ASM) with the Namibia clasp for recognition of service in peacekeeping and non-warlike operations. Following a review in 2001, the ASM was upgraded to the Australian Active Service Medal (AASM) for recognition of service in a warlike operation. Personnel also received the United Nations UNTAG medal.

=== Gulf War (1990–1991) ===
The Gulf War commenced on 2 August 1990 when Iraq invaded Kuwait. Following an announcement on 10 August 1990 by Prime Minister Bob Hawke, the Australian contribution to the Gulf War centred around the ADF deploying a Naval Task Force to the Gulf area, named Operation Damask. This was part of a larger multinational response involving 34 nations in support of United Nations Security Council Resolutions.

Australia's Naval Task Force included the ships HMAS Darwin, HMAS Adelaide and HMAS Success which were deployed in Operation Damask I, HMAS Brisbane, HMAS Sydney and HMAS Westralia deployed in Operation Damask II, and HMAS Darwin deployed again in Operation Damask III. A Clearance Diving Team and Task Group Medical Support Element (TGMSE) were also deployed.

The ADF raised the TGMSE under Royal Australian Navy (RAN) medical command as a contribution to the coalition medical support requirement. The TGMSE's were assigned to the American hospital ship USNS Comfort (T-AH-20). The personnel were doctors, nurses and health administration personnel, predominantly from the RAN, supplemented with Army and Air Force personnel, including members of the Reserve forces. After USNS Comfort arrived in the Gulf in September 1990, the Australian TGMSE personnel undertook normal medical duties and participated in operational medical exercises and drills including training for the handling of casualties of biological and chemical warfare.

Although large numbers of casualties did not occur, medical personnel were required to manage seriously injured and ill personnel including the casualties from the boiler room explosion on USS Iwo Jima (LPH-2) on 30 October 1990. Ten sailors died, six at the scene and four on board USNS Comfort. USNS Comfort was also called upon on 25 February 1991 when a SCUD missile attack from Iraq destroyed a US Army barracks in Dharan, Saudi Arabia, killing 28 soldiers and wounding another 110.

There were three TGMSE rotations:

- TGMSE 1 deployed on 13 September 1990 and completed service on 4 January 1991
- TGMSE 2 deployed on 31 December until 15 March 1991
- TGMSE 3 deployed on 13 January until 15 March 1991

A total of 59 ADF personnel were involved in the TGMSE, including three personnel from 1 FD Hosp.

=== Peacekeeping operations and war fighting, 1990s–2000s ===
In the years since the Gulf War, ADF medical personnel have been deployed on numerous peacekeeping operations throughout the Middle East, Africa, and the Asia-Pacific region. The first of these came in May 1991, when a group of 75 ADF personnel, including two from 1 FD Hosp, were deployed to Kurdistan, in northern Iraq, on Operation Habitat, Australia's contribution to the multinational response known as Operation Provide Comfort. The goal of this mission was to defend approximately 4 million Kurdish people fleeing their homes in the aftermath of the Gulf War and supply them with humanitarian aid.

Further deployments were carried out throughout the 1990s. These included: Cambodia (1992–1993), Operation Solace to Somalia (1992–1995), Operation Tamar which was part of the United Nations Assistance Mission for Rwanda (UNAMIR) in 1994–1995, the Solomon Islands (1995–1996), Operation Bel Isi to Bougainville (1997–2003), Operation Shaddock to Vanimo, in Papua New Guinea (1998), and as part of the International Force for East Timor in 1999–2000. Further deployments throughout the 2000s have included support to humanitarian assistance and disaster relief operations across the Asia Pacific region and in Australia. The battalion has also provided contingents of personnel on rotation to Australia's contributions to operational missions including those in Iraq and Afghanistan.

== Previous Structure ==
-1st Field Hospital (1FD Hosp) 1968 - 2000

-1st Health Support Battalion (1HSB) 2000 - 2011

-1st Close Health Battalion (1CHB) 2012 - 2022: the battalion consisting of the following units:

- Headquarters 1st Close Health Battalion (Sydney)
- 2nd Close Health Company (Townsville)
- 8th Close Health Company (Darwin)
- 11th Close Health Company (Brisbane)
