= Keswick, South Australia =

Keswick
- Suburb
- Coordinates: 34°56′S 138°34′E
- Country: Australia
- State: South Australia
- City: Adelaide
- LGA: City of West Torrens

Government
  - State electorate: Badcoe
  - Federal division: Adelaide

Population
  - Total: 754 (SAL 2021)
- Postcode: 5035
Suburbs around Keswick
Richmond	Mile End South, Keswick Terminal	Adelaide, Adelaide Park Lands
Marleston	Keswick	Wayville
Kurralta Park	Ashford, Forestville	Wayville

Keswick (/ˈkɛzɪk/) is an inner south-western suburb of Adelaide, adjacent to the park lands, and located in the City of West Torrens. The suburb is home to the Keswick Barracks, the headquarters of the Royal District Nursing Service, the Keswick Cricket Club and Richmond Primary School.

The Adelaide Parklands Terminal for interstate passenger trains, formerly known as Keswick Terminal, was within the boundary of the suburb until 1987 when, inclusive of adjacent business sites and covering a total area of 56.6 hectares (140 acres), it was declared a suburb in its own right.

== History ==
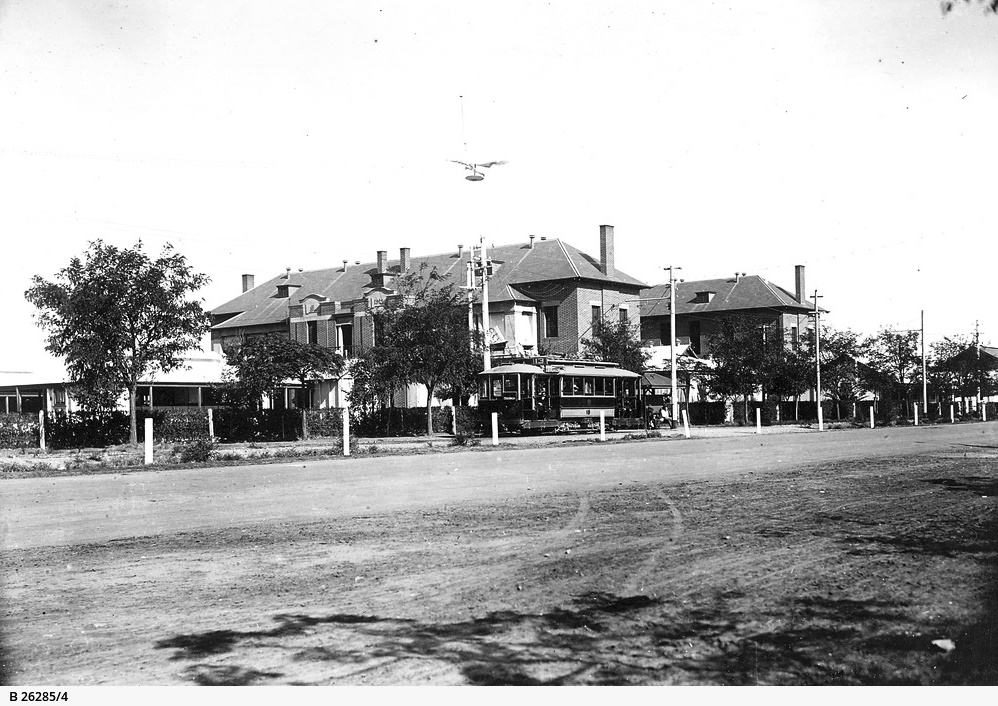
No. 7 Australian General Hospital, Keswick, Adelaide, 1920

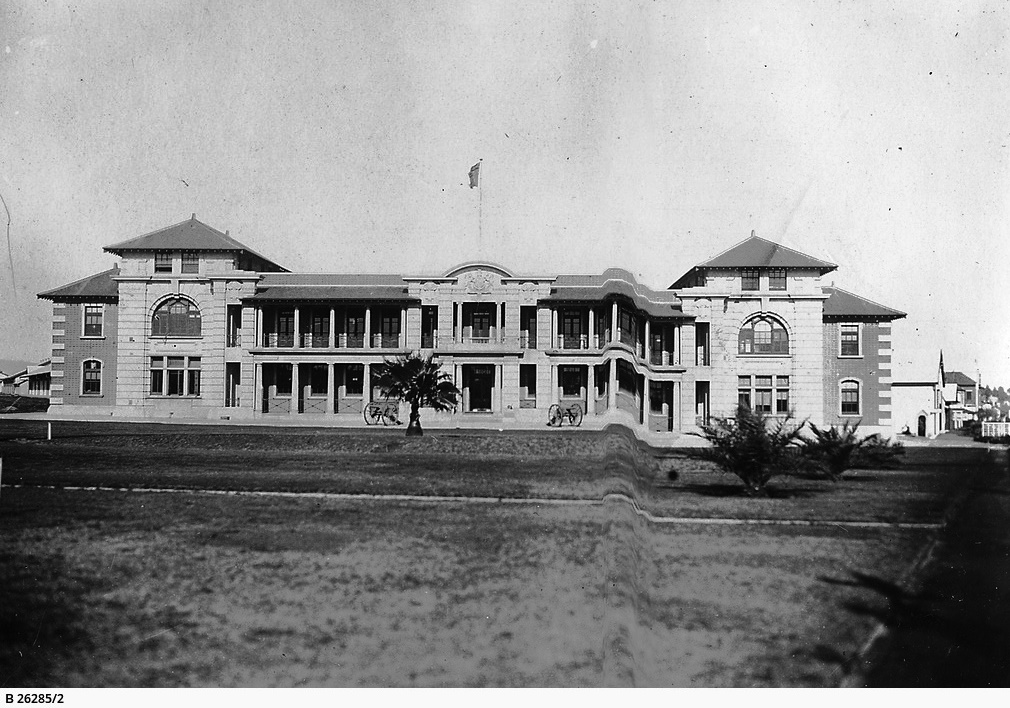
Keswick Barracks, Adelaide, c.1918

The area was inhabited by the Kaurna people before settlement by Europeans.

Keswick railway station was opened on 6 April 1913. It serviced the local Adelaide train network before being eventually closed and demolished in March 2013.

The District Headquarters of the 4th Military District, known as Keswick Barracks or "The Home of the Brass Hats", was completed in 1913, and was the first substantial Commonwealth building to be constructed in South Australia. It has had several modifications, including the addition of an extra storey in 1940, and is still standing, located on Anzac Highway, in the northern corner of Keswick Military Barracks.

In 1915, the Keswick Hospital (No. 7 Australian General Hospital), also known as the "Diggers Hospital", Repatriation Hospital, or Repatriation General Hospital, was built to accommodate wounded soldiers returning from World War I as part of the Keswick Barracks complex. In November 1915 funds were being raised to build a recreation hall for the soldiers, designed by Woods, Bagot, Jory & Laybourne Smith, which opened on 11 February 1916. After the opening of the Daw Park Repatriation General Hospital, patients were transferred from Keswick Hospital in December 1946, but an outpatients facility continued to operate at Keswick until 1968, when it finally closed.

On 18 September 1918, tram line opened between the existing Sturt Street line, via West Terrace, down Anzac Highway (then Bay Road), to Keswick. It was used to transport returned soldiers to the hospital. Known as the West City Line, it terminated at the entry to the Keswick Army Barracks. After redevelopment of the Bay Road in the 1930s, the tram line was eventually truncated at the new Keswick Bridge in March 1939.

The Keswick Terminal opened on 18 May 1984 (near, but not connected to, the Keswick railway station), developed by Australian National as a dedicated long-haul passenger rail station. It was officially classified as a suburb in the City of West Torrens on 30 April 1987.

== Population ==
In the 2021 Australian Census, there were 754 people in Keswick. 54.8% of people were born in Australia and 58.1% of people spoke only English at home. The most common response for religion was "No Religion", 42.8%.

== Significant establishments ==
=== Keswick Barracks ===
Keswick is home to Keswick Barracks, which is an Australian Army Barracks. It is home to the 9th Brigade (Reserve), 10th/27th Battalion, Royal South Australia Regiment (Reserve), the 48th Field Battery (Reserve), and the headquarters of the 3rd Health Support Battalion (3 HSB). Keswick Barracks also houses several DCO (Defence Community Organisation) departments, the SA Branch of RUSI and the local RUSI library. There is an Air Force unit here too.

=== Royal District Nursing Service ===
Keswick is also home to the headquarters of the Royal District Nursing Service, now part of the Silver Chain Group.

=== Keswick Cricket Club ===
Keswick Cricket Club was founded in November 1942, with the principle of, "giving anyone who wants to play a game of cricket, an opportunity to play". At this time, the Keswick Branch of the Catholic Young Men's Society combined with the Glenelg Branch of the Catholic Young Men's Society to form a cricket team to participate in the Catholic Young Men's Society Cricket Association Competition.

KCC now fields 4 teams in the Adelaide & Suburban Cricket Association. Matches are played on hard-wicket and turf surfaces around the Adelaide metropolitan area. Keswick Juniors fields U10, U12 and U14 sides in the South Central Junior Cricket Association, and a team in the Adelaide Strikers Girls League.

== Heritage-listed buildings ==
The Headquarters Building of Keswick Barracks was added to the former Register of the National Estate on 28 September 1982 and to the Australian Commonwealth Heritage List on 22 June 2004.

The first building of Richmond Primary School was granted local heritage status from the City of West Torrens on 2 October 2008.

== Schools ==
Richmond Primary School is a coeducational R–7 school (5- to 13-year-olds) located in the Adelaide inner suburb of Keswick, South Australia. It was constructed in 1898 in Keswick, South Australia located in the Federal Division of Adelaide, the State Electorate of Badcoe and City of West Torrens.

=== Notable students ===
- Wally Shiers (as a mechanic) who along with aviators Ross Smith and Keith Smith were the first men to fly from London to Australia in the Vickers Vimey.
- Glen Broomhill was a Member of the South Australian Parliament and architect of one of the first modern day container deposit schemes in 1975.
- Raymond Specht
- Brian Herbert Medlin
- Errol Noack was the first Australian conscript to be killed in the Vietnam War on 24 May 1966.

== See also ==
- List of Adelaide suburbs
