= Keswick railway station, Adelaide =

Former railway station in Adelaide, South Australia

Coordinates: 34°56′29″S 138°34′58″E

Keswick
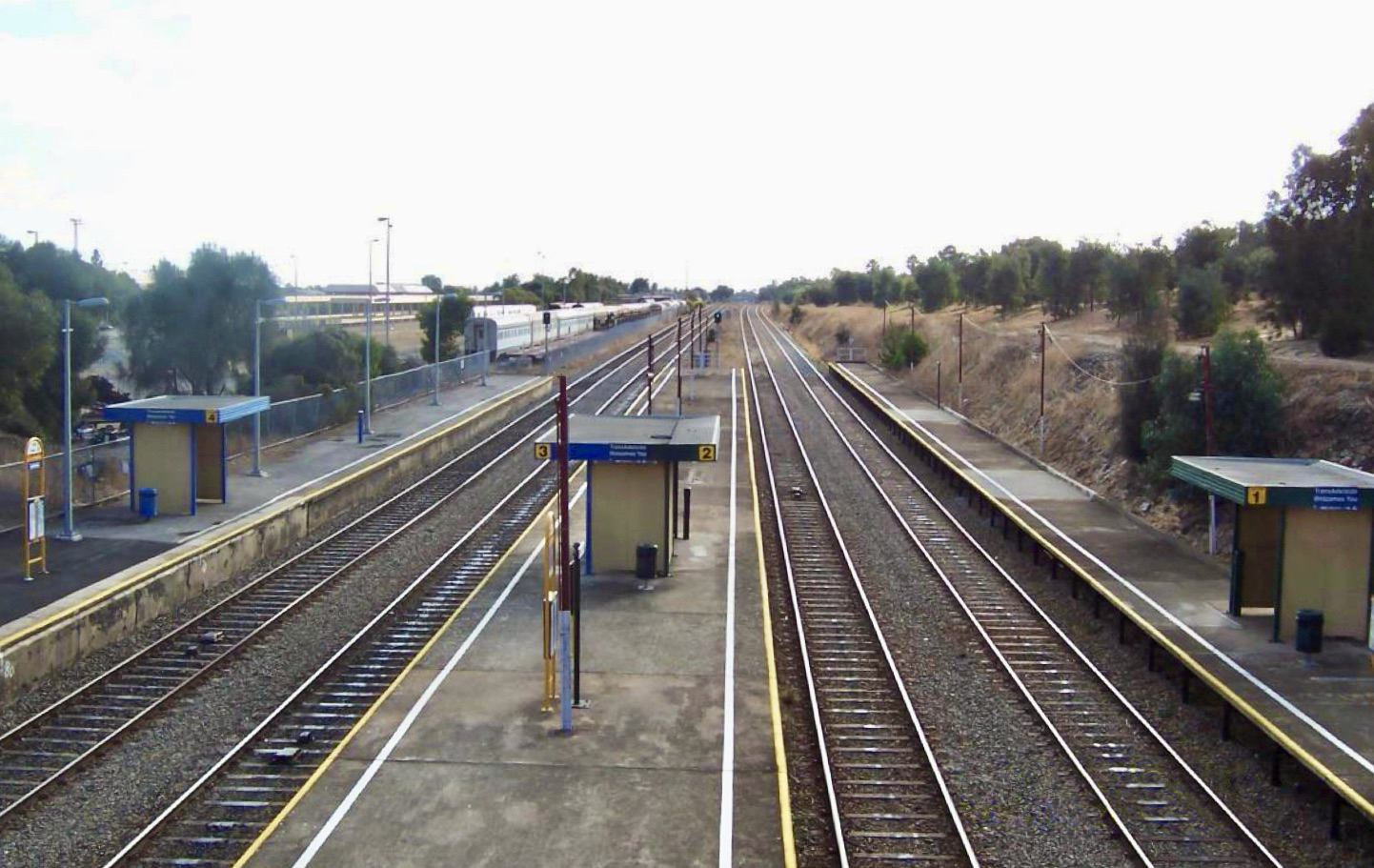
- Northbound view from Keswick Bridge, 2005

General information
- Location: Anzac Highway; Keswick
- Owner: Department of Planning, Transport & Infrastructure
- Line: Adelaide-Wolseley
- Distance: 3.8 km (2.4 mi) from Adelaide railway station
- Platforms: 4

History
- Opened: 6 April 1913
- Closed: 2013
Location

Keswick railway station was a station on the Adelaide-Wolseley line that served routes on the South line, most recently to Adelaide Metro's Belair, Noarlunga and Tonsley line services. It was located in the inner western Adelaide suburb of Keswick, 3.8 kilometres (2.4 miles) from Adelaide railway station.

== History ==
Keswick station was opened on 6 April 1913. Within months of opening, a station master was appointed to manage bulk goods business, including firewood and sand bricks. A ticket office was added in 1927. In 1984, a new interstate passenger railway station, initially named Keswick Terminal but since 2008 Adelaide Parklands Terminal, was opened immediately north of the station on the western side of the South line.

The station was closed and demolished in March 2013 during the closure of the Noarlunga and Tonsley lines, in preparation for the electrification of those lines. At the time of its closure, it was the only station on the Adelaide suburban system without wheelchair access, the steep terrain and sparse patronage being prohibitive. A new Adelaide Showground station south of the Keswick Bridge opened on 17 February 2014, replacing Keswick as well as the annual temporary Showground Central station.

== Services by platform ==
At the time of the station's closure in 2013, services were as follows:

Platform	Destination/s	Notes
1	Noarlunga Centre / Tonsley	
2	Adelaide	
3	Noarlunga Centre / Tonsley / Belair	
4	Adelaide	
