= Headquarters Building, Keswick Barracks =

Heritage-listed military building in Adelaide, South Australia

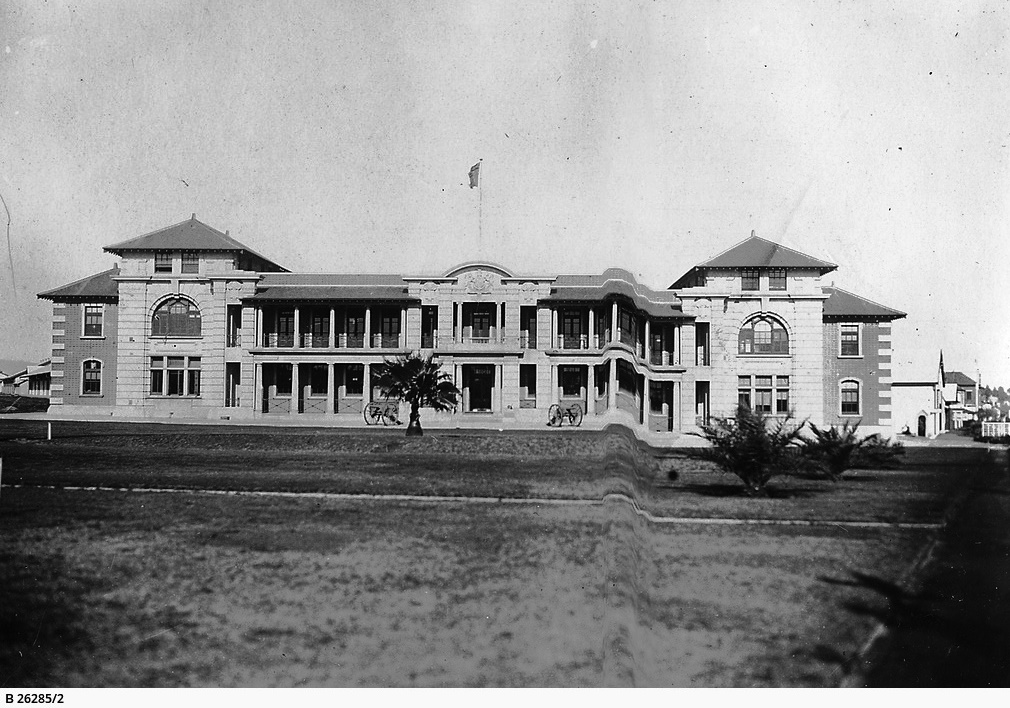
- Keswick Barracks, Adelaide, c.1918

- Location within South Australia
- 34.9438°S 138.5824°E
- Location: Anzac Highway, Keswick, South Australia, Australia

Commonwealth Heritage List
- Official name: Headquarters Building 32, Keswick Barracks
- Type: Listed place (Historic)
- Designated: 22 June 2004
- Reference no.: 105308

Headquarters Building (Building 32) is a heritage-listed office building at Keswick Barracks, Anzac Highway, Keswick, South Australia, Australia. It was added to the Australian Commonwealth Heritage List on 22 June 2004 and the former Register of the National Estate on 28 September 1982.

== History ==
In 1854, a Militia Act was passed in South Australia, giving the Government the power to call out a force of 2000 volunteers. This early military force was based at the Mounted Police Barracks off Kintore Avenue in Adelaide. A military parade ground was located in the area now occupied by the north and east wings of the South Australian Museum. A permanent military force was authorised in 1878, and in 1884 a force of one officer and 20 men was raised. As early as 1889, the unification of Australia's colonial military forces was suggested. With the Federation of Australia, South Australia's defence force, along with the other colonial defence forces, was taken over by the Commonwealth.

As the development of a Commonwealth public works department took some time, the responsibility for constructing and maintaining Commonwealth Government buildings in South Australia, specifically post offices, customs and defence buildings, was initially given to the South Australian Public Works Department.

In 1912, a contract was let for the construction of a military headquarters at Keswick in South Australia for a cost of 21,990 pounds. Contracts were also let for the Royal Australian Field Artillery Barracks at 14,565 pounds and for stables, gun park, barn, farriers shop, gym, quartermaster's store and sick horse bay for 12,999 pounds. The Headquarters Building was completed in 1913 and was the first substantial Commonwealth building to be constructed in South Australia.

The building served as the headquarters of the 4th Military District during World War I, and was known colloquially as "The Home of the Brass Hats".

In 1940, an additional storey was constructed on the flat roof of the Headquarters Building. The architect for this work was W. H. Hanal. In 1969 the boiler house and toilet block on the western side of the building were removed. Keswick Barracks continues to be used for defence purposes.

== Description ==
The Headquarters Building is a three-storey brick building in the Federation Academic Classical style is on the northern corner of the Keswick Barracks site. The facade features two large towers, placed at either end of the building, and a central section with a segmental pediment, containing a coat-of-arms. The towers and the central section feature stucco detailing that imitates rustication. A two-storey colonnade runs between the towers and the central section.

The building is in good condition. It has been used as a military headquarters since completion and has therefore undergone few alterations. An extra floor was added in 1940, but this reflects the development of the army during WWII, and is therefore of significance. A boiler room and toilet block was removed in 1969. (1992)

== Heritage listing ==
The Headquarters Building, Keswick Barracks, built in 1912-13, is significant as the first substantial Commonwealth building constructed in South Australia. It was built as part of a Commonwealth program to expand defence infrastructure following Federation and it has been used for defence purposes since it was completed. The Headquarters Building is a central building at Keswick Barracks, one of the first significant barracks to be established in Australia after the formation of the Australian Army. Keswick Barracks has remained the headquarters of the Army in South Australia.

The Headquarters Building is important as a good example of an early twentieth-century purpose-built military headquarters. Constructed in the Federation Academic Classical style, the building demonstrates attitudes to the design and planning of military buildings in the Federation period.
