= Adelaide Showground railway station =

Railway station in Adelaide, South Australia

Adelaide Showground
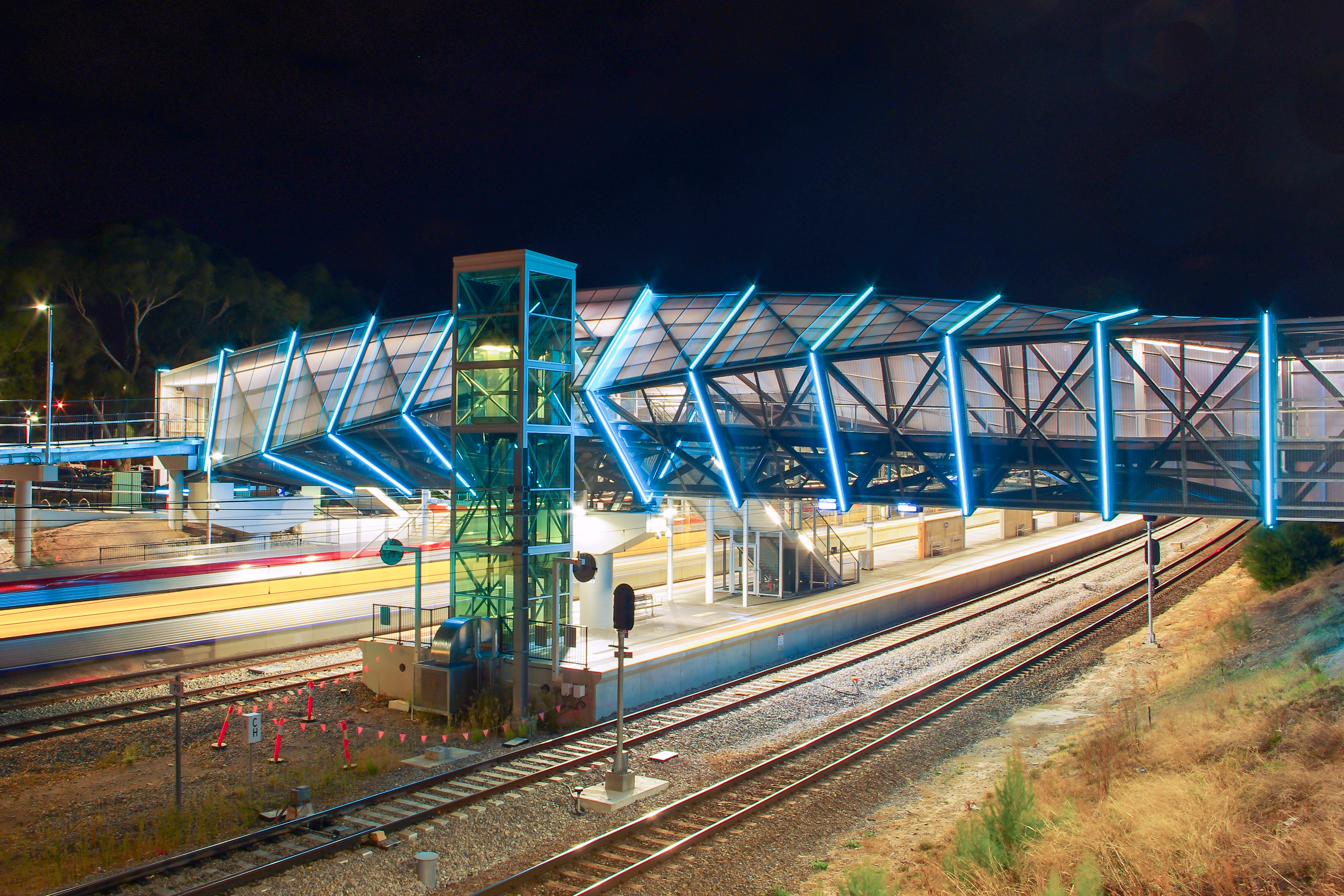
- Southbound view of the station platforms and footbridge at night, March 2015

General information
- Location: Rose Terrace, Wayville
- Coordinates: 34°56′29″S 138°34′58″E
- Owner: Department for Infrastructure & Transport
- Operator: Adelaide Metro
- Lines: Belair, Seaford, Flinders
- Distance: 4 km from Adelaide
- Platforms: 3
- Tracks: 4
- Connections: Bus

Construction
- Structure type: Ground - 1 side platform, 1 island platform
- Parking: Yes
- Cycle facilities: Yes
- Accessible: Yes

Other information
- Station code: 18104 (to City); 18583 (to Seaford, Flinders, Belair)
- Website: Adelaide Metro

History
- Opened: 17 February 2014

Services
Preceding station	Adelaide Metro	Following station
Mile End towards Adelaide	Belair line	Goodwood towards Belair
Mile End towards Adelaide	Flinders line	Goodwood towards Flinders
Mile End towards Adelaide	Seaford line	Goodwood towards Seaford
Location

Adelaide Showground railway station is located on the Belair, Flinders and Seaford lines, and is located in the inner western Adelaide suburb of Keswick. It is four kilometres from Adelaide station, and replaced Keswick station and the temporary Showground Central station.

== History ==
The station opened on 17 February 2014. Unlike the former Showground Central station, which was only used during the Royal Adelaide Show, Adelaide Showground station is serviced every day as a regular part of the Belair, Flinders and Seaford lines. The interstate Adelaide Parklands Terminal is located nearby.

In late 2016, the station was ranked as the best station in the western suburbs based on five criteria. The reasons cited included: "Excellent condition in regard to all items, reflecting the recent construction and good upkeep since. No toilets. There are relatively few seats."

== Services by platform ==
Platform	Destination/s	Notes
1	Seaford/Flinders	To Belair (Occasionally Used)
2	Adelaide	
3	Adelaide/Belair	To Seaford/Flinders (Occasionally Used)

== Bus transfers ==
The closest bus stops are Stop 1 on Anzac Highway, 1A on Richmond Road and 1B on Greenhill Road.

Bus transfers: Stop 1 (Anzac Highway)
Route no.	Destination & route details
167	City – Camden Park – Glenelg (to City only)
168	City – Camden Park – Glenelg (to City only)
241	City – Edwardstown – Westfield Marion
245	City – Morphettville – Oaklands
248	City – Morphettville – Westfield Marion
262	Westfield Marion – Brighton – City
263	City – Hove – Westfield Marion
265	City – Brighton – Westfield Marion
719	City – Edwardstown – Flinders University
721	City – Reynella – Noarlunga Centre Interchange
722	City – Woodcroft – Noarlunga Centre Interchange
723F	City – Happy Valley – Colonnades Shopping Centre
M44	Golden Grove Village – City – Westfield Marion
N262	City – Glenelg – Westfield Marion
N721	City – Noarlunga Centre Interchange – Moana
T721	City – Reynella – Noarlunga Centre Interchange (Limited Stops)
T722	City – Woodcroft – Noarlunga Centre Interchange (Limited Stops)

Bus transfers: Stop 1A (Richmond Road)
Route no.	Destination & route details
167	City – Camden Park – Glenelg
168	City – Camden Park – Glenelg
580	Keswick – Magill – Paradise Interchange

Bus transfers: Stop 1B (Greenhill Road)
Route no.	Destination & route details
580	Keswick – Magill – Paradise Interchange
