= Keswick Bridge =

- Coordinates: 34°56′37″S 138°34′54″E
- Carries: Anzac Highway
- Crosses: Adelaide–Wolseley railway line
- Locale: Keswick Terminal and Wayville
- Owner: Department for Infrastructure and Transport

Characteristics
- No. of lanes: 6

History
- Constructed by: Baulderstone
- Opened: 27 October 1967

Location
- Interactive map of Keswick Bridge

The Keswick Bridge carries the Anzac Highway over the Adelaide–Wolseley railway line in Adelaide, Australia.

== History ==
The Anzac Highway crossed over the Adelaide–Wolseley railway line via a flat junction to the south of Keswick railway station. In 1911, the South Australian Railways built a bridge over the line, that was widened in 1927.

A new bridge built by Baulderstone was officially opened by Premier Don Dunstan on 27 October 1967.
