= Showground Central railway station =

Former railway station in South Australia, Australia

Showground Central

General information
- Location: Richards Terrace, Wayville
- Owner: DPTI
- Operator: Adelaide Metro
- Lines: Belair Line, Seaford Line
- Distance: 4.4 km from Adelaide
- Platforms: 1

Construction
- Structure type: Temporary

History
- Opened: September 2003
- Closed: September 2013

Services
Preceding station	Adelaide Metro	Following station
Adelaide Terminus	Showground Central line (temporary)	Terminus

Showground Central railway station was a temporary station in the inner southern Adelaide suburb of Wayville, South Australia, located 4.4 kilometres from Adelaide station. The station was only used during the Royal Adelaide Show in early September each year.

== History ==
Showground Central station was first used in September 2003. It was located between Keswick and Goodwood stations, adjacent to the Adelaide Showground on the eastern side of the Belair and Seaford lines. It consisted of a single temporary platform that was assembled for the duration of the show, then removed and stored until the following year. The temporary platform was noted in 2004 as having "a significant effect on patronage, with over 90,000 passengers using this facility during the Show".

Initially it was served by regular Belair and Seaford services making additional stops along with a special service from the Gawler line operating via the Adelaide Gaol loop. In 2005 these services ceased to call at the station with an express shuttle running along between Adelaide station and Showground Central introduced and remaining in place until the station's closure.

Showground Central was last used in 2013, with a permanent Adelaide Showground railway station opening in February 2014 to replace both the old seasonal station and Keswick station.
