= 2nd Brigade (Australia) =

Brigade of the Australian Army

2nd Health Brigade
- Active: 1903–1945; 2023–present
- Country: Australia
- Branch: Australian Army
- Type: Infantry (1903–1945); Health (2023–present)
- Size: 1,700 (2023)
- Part of: 1st Division (1914–20); 4th Division (1920–43); 2nd Division (1943–45); Forces Command (2023–present)
- Engagements: First World War: Gallipoli campaign; Western Front; Second World War

Insignia
- Unit colour patch

The 2nd Health Brigade (2HB) is an Australian Army brigade. The 2nd Brigade was formed in 1903 as a militia infantry formation based in Victoria, the brigade later served during the First World War as part of the Australian Imperial Force, allocated to the 1st Division. During the war, the 2nd Brigade took part in the fighting at Gallipoli, including the Battle of Krithia where it lost almost a third of its strength. Later they took part in the Battle of Lone Pine before being withdrawn back to Egypt in December 1915. Following this the brigade was transferred to the Western Front in France and Belgium where, between March 1916 and the armistice in November 1918, they took part in most of the major Allied operations.

In the 1920s the brigade reverted to a part-time militia formation, once again based in Victoria, forming part of the 4th Division. During the Second World War, the brigade remained a part of 4th Division until 1943, when it was reallocated to the 2nd Division based in Western Australia where they were tasked with carrying out garrison duties before being redeployed to Darwin at the end of the year as the threat of invasion by the Japanese decreased. It was eventually disbanded in early 1945.

The brigade was re-raised on 3 March 2023 to command the Army's four new health battalions.

== History ==
=== Formation ===
Originally formed in 1903 as a Militia unit of the Commonwealth Military Forces, it was established in Victoria and consisted of four battalion-sized units—5th, 6th, 7th and 8th Australian Infantry Regiments. In 1908 the units were retitled so that they became the 1st Battalions of their regimental designations. In 1912, the compulsory training scheme was introduced and at this time the brigade was reorganised as part of the 1st Military District, with constituent units were spread across various locations in Queensland including Toombul, Nundah and Brisbane.

=== First World War ===
During the First World War, the brigade was re-constituted as part of the Australian Imperial Force, as part of the 1st Division. Made up of four battalions that were raised from volunteers for overseas service from Victoria, each consisting of 1,023 men—5th, 6th, 7th and 8th Battalions—and initially under the command of Colonel James Whiteside McCay, and was among the first Australian formations to be sent overseas. As part of the 1st Division, after initial training, it was sent to Egypt, where they took part in the defence of the Suez Canal in the wake of the First Suez Offensive before taking part in the Gallipoli campaign, landing at Anzac Cove on 25 April 1915, coming ashore in the second wave.

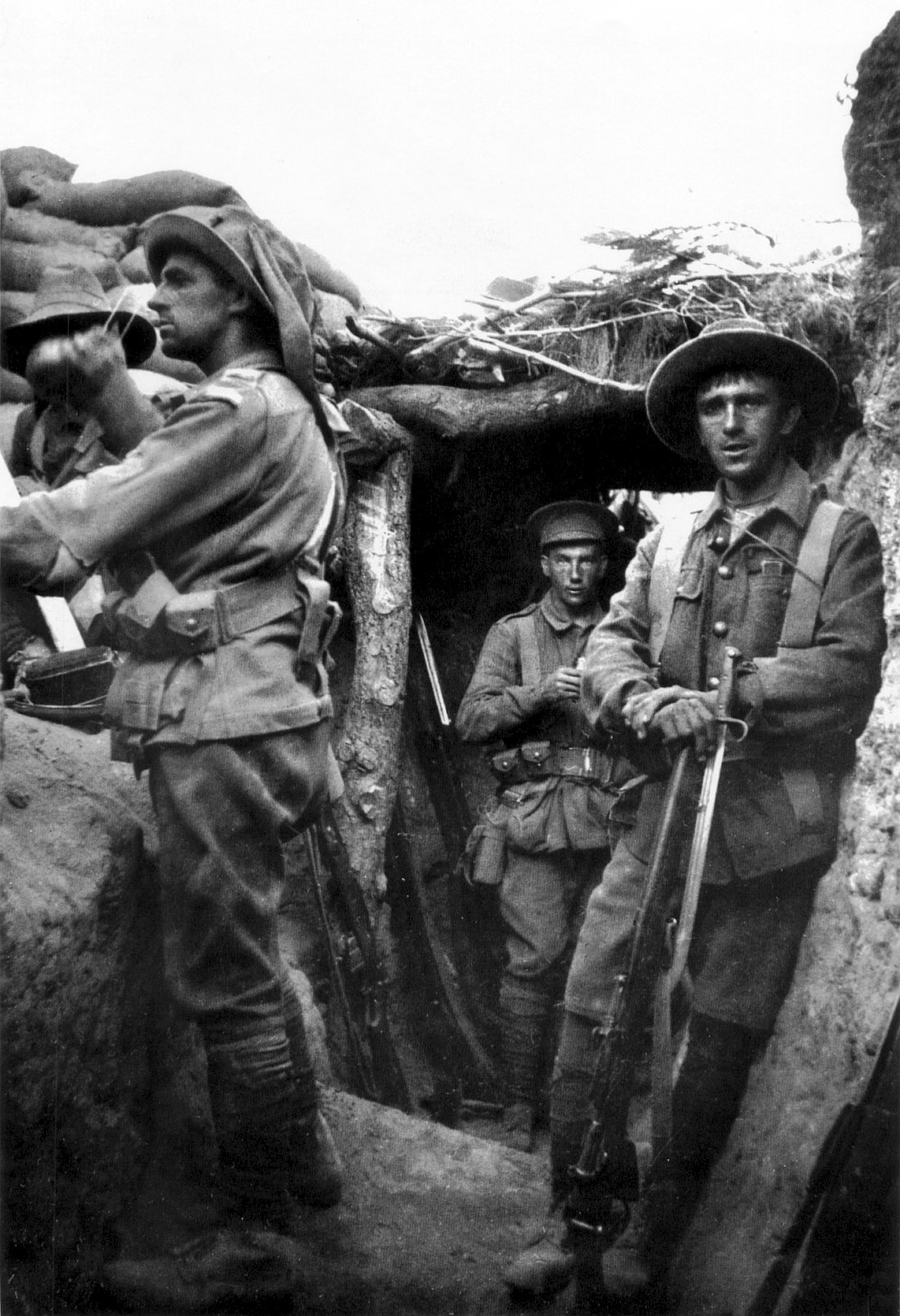
Troops from the 1st and 2nd brigades at Lone Pine, 6 August 1915

Early in May the battalions of the 2nd Brigade moved from the beachhead at Anzac Cove to the British and French lodgement at Cape Helles where on 8 May they were involved in the Second Battle of Krithia, carrying out the first brigade-level attack by Australian infantry against an entrenched enemy force and during which they suffered losses equal to roughly a third of its strength in what was a largely unsuccessful attack. After this the 2nd Brigade returned to Anzac Cove on 16 May. During the August Offensive they took part in the Battle of Lone Pine during the August Offensive. Following this the brigade was involved in largely defensive duties until they were withdrawn as part of the general evacuation of Allied troops from the peninsula in December 1915.

Following this the brigade returned to Egypt where they once again took part in the defence of the Suez Canal before embarking for France in March 1916. Arriving shortly after this, they took up positions in the trenches of the Western Front. Their first significant involvement in combat in Europe came in July 1916 during the Battle of Pozières and after this, over the course of the next two and a half years, they took part in most of the major Allied operations against the German Army. Other notable engagements that the brigade took part in included the Third Battle of Ypres in 1917, the German spring offensive and the Hundred Days Offensive in 1918.

During the war, the units of the 2nd Brigade suffered 7,988 casualties of which 3,958 were killed. Eight men from these units also received the Victoria Cross.

=== Inter war years ===
In 1919, the 2nd Brigade, was reformed as part of the Militia, in the 1st Military District in Queensland. Initially it consisted of six battalion-sized units: the 2nd and 5th Battalions, 9th Infantry Regiment; the 2nd Battalion, 15th Infantry Regiment; the 2nd Battalion, 25th Infantry Regiment; the 2nd Battalion, 26th Infantry Regiment and the 2nd Battalion, 31st Infantry Regiment. The following year, it was assigned to the 4th Infantry Division in Victoria and in 1921 when the AIF was finally officially disbanded, the citizen force infantry regiments were reorganised to perpetuate the numerical designations and battle honours of the AIF.

In 1924 the brigade was part of the 3rd Military District in Victoria, consisting of the 5th, 6th, 7th and 8th Battalions. Over the course of the inter war years, the brigade's component units changed a number of times as the economic pressures of the Great Depression lead to a reduction in the size of the Militia and the amalgamation of a number of battalions. In 1928, just before the end of compulsory military training, the brigade consisted of the 5th, 6th, 23rd and 32nd Battalions. Later, in 1934, it was made up of the 5th, 6th, 8th and 14th Battalions. These units remained in the brigade until 1939.

=== Second World War ===
Following the outbreak of the Second World War in 1939 the Australian government decided to raise an all-volunteer force for overseas service. This force was known as the Second Australian Imperial Force. Although conscription was reintroduced in early 1940, the provisions of the Defence Act (1903) prevented the dispatch of conscripts to fight except within the boundaries of Australia and its external territories. As a result, as the units of the newly raised 2nd AIF were sent overseas to North Africa, the Militia were called up progressively for three months continuous training in order to improve the overall readiness of Australia's defences.

Initially, the brigade was composed of four infantry battalions under the overall command of temporary Brigadier George Langley: the 5th Battalion (Victorian Scottish Regiment), the 6th Battalion, the 14th Battalion (Prahan Regiment), the 32nd Battalion (Footscray Regiment) and the Melbourne University Rifles. However, in early 1940, the Australian Army's brigade establishment was reduced from to three battalions in order to fall in line with standard British doctrine.

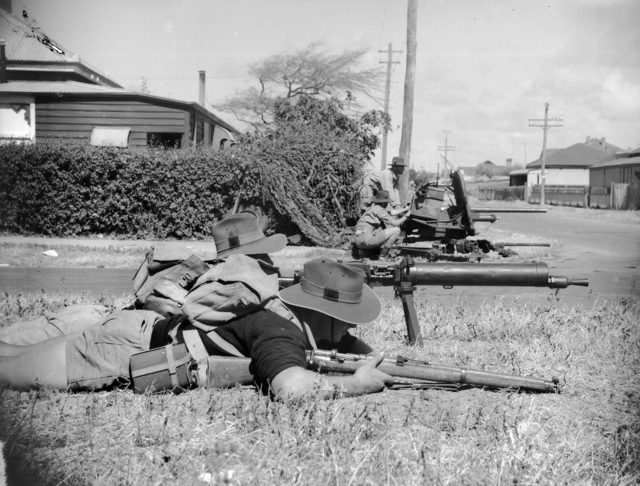
In October 1942, Militia units from the 2nd and 4th Divisions took part in large-scale defensive exercise in Geraldton, Western Australia.

Following the entry of Japan into the war in December 1941, and their subsequent advance through Malaya and New Guinea, units of the Militia were called upon to carry out garrison and defensive duties around Australia in response to the perceived threat of invasion. The 2nd Brigade was mobilised at Mount Martha, and initially assigned to defend the Melbourne area. In this role, two battalions were deployed to Flinders and Portsea, while brigade headquarters and two other battalions remained around Red Hill. Following this the 14th and 32nd Battalions were merged and later transferred to the 6th Brigade. In February 1942 the Melbourne University Rifles were also removed from the brigade's order of battle.

In May 1942 the 2nd Brigade, as part of the 4th Division moved from Victoria to Western Australia and at this time the brigade gained the 2/11th Battalion, a Western Australian AIF unit that had fought in North Africa, Greece and Crete, before being virtually destroyed and brought back to Australia. In October 1942, along with the rest of the 4th Division and units from the 2nd Division they took part in a corps-level exercise in Geraldton, Western Australia.

In early 1943, the 2nd Brigade was transferred to the 2nd Division, based in the Mount Lawley area, where they carried out garrison duties along with the 5th and 8th Brigades. In July the 2/11th Battalion were transferred to the 19th Brigade in Queensland. Later, in August 1943, however, the brigade was moved to Darwin, when it became part of the LHQ Reserve. In September 1943 the 5th and 6th Battalions were joined by the 19th Machine Gun Battalion, and then in December by the 10th/48th Battalion.

By late 1944, however, the threat of invasion no longer existed and the division along with many of its component units were disbanded in order to ease some of the labour shortages being experienced in the Australian economy. Between August and November 1944 most of its component units were transferred out and disbanded and as its strength diminished, the 2nd Brigade was finally disbanded on 8 January 1945 while at Wallgrove, New South Wales.

== Current role ==
The brigade was re-raised on 3 March 2023 as the 2nd Health Brigade to command the Army's four newly raised health battalions. Its headquarters is located at Victoria Barracks, Sydney and it forms part of the Army's Forces Command. The brigade was established following an Army Health Capability review to integrate regular Army units and Army Reserve units under the one command. The Army's three health battalions and psychology unit that were part of 17th Sustainment Brigade, and medical companies from Army Reserve brigades and Regional Support Force medical detachments that were part of 2nd Division, were disbanded to form the four new health battalions. The four integrated multi-role health battalions provide combat health, mental health and allied health services.

As of 2023 the brigade consists of the following units:

- Headquarters, 2nd Health Brigade (Victoria Barracks, NSW)
- 1st Health Battalion (Robertson Barracks, NT)
- 2nd Health Battalion (Gallipoli Barracks, Qld)
- 3rd Health Battalion (Keswick Barracks, SA)
- 4th Health Battalion (Lavarack Barracks, Qld)
