= Royal Australian Army Dental Corps =

Administrative corps of the Australian Army

- Badge
- Active: 1943–present
- Country: Australia
- Branch: Army
- Type: Corps
- Role: Provision of military dental services
- Motto: Honour the Work
- March: "Puff the Magic Dragon"

Insignia
- Abbreviation: RAADC

The Royal Australian Army Dental Corps (RAADC) is a corps within the Australian Army. It was formed on 23 April 1943 during World War II as the Australian Army Dental Corps, before being granted the 'Royal' prefix in 1948. Prior to its formation dentists were part of the Australian Army Medical Corps. The role of the RAADC is to provide dental care to army personnel in order to minimise the requirement for the evacuation of dental casualties, to conserve manpower and to reduce the burden of casualty evacuation. In the post-war years, the corps has provided personnel to deployments in Japan, Korea and Vietnam. It has also contributed to peace-keeping operations in Somalia, Rwanda, Bougainville and East Timor.

== History ==
=== World War I ===
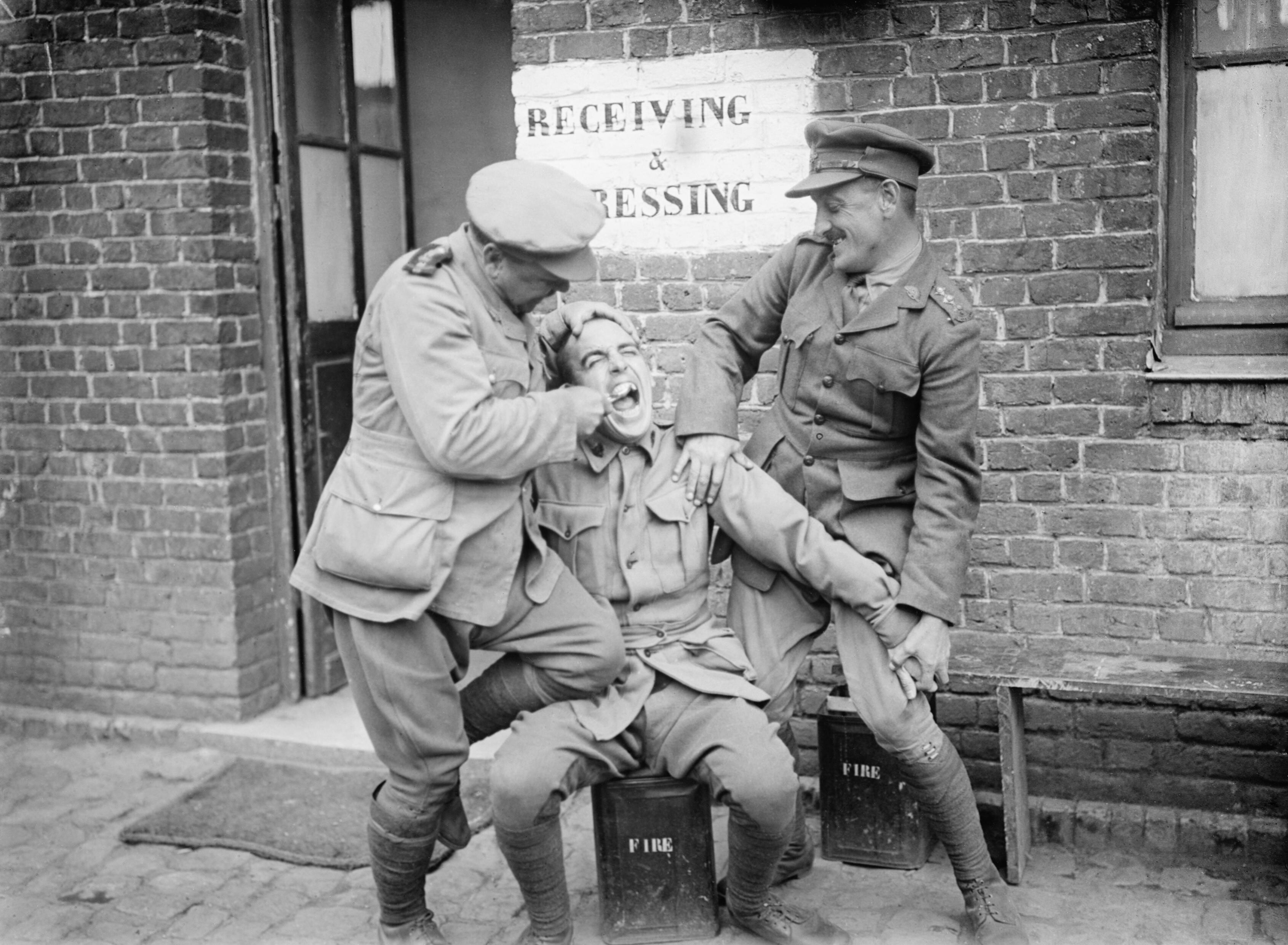
A humorous photograph of an Australian Chaplain acting as a dentist near Fleurbaix, June 1916. He is trying to operate on an Australian Captain while another officer, also Captain, is holding the "patient".

Although it was officially formed in 1943, the corps has its genesis in an earlier formation that was raised for service during World War I as part of the Australian Army Medical Corps. Prior to the war some efforts had been made to try to raise a dental service in the Australian military as part of the institution of universal military service as a result of lessons learned during the Sudan Expedition and the Boer War, however, these attempts had not come to fruition. Upon the outbreak of the war in 1914, there was no provision for establishment or organisation of dental services in the British Order of Battle, upon which Australia based its own Order of Battle at the time. Therefore, despite advice from dentists and requests from formation commanders at the outset of the war, the army thought there was no need for dental services, nor even for the supply of dental medicines or equipment. However, even though the Australian authorities initially saw no need to provide dental services to soldiers, a number of trained dentists volunteered for service and provided dental services on their own initiative.

In the official absence of interest from the Army, many dentists and dental technicians volunteered as medical orderlies or even as infantrymen, in order to serve their country. Largely the services of dental volunteers were also rejected when the Australian Naval and Military Expeditionary Force was raised for deployment against German possessions in the Pacific. However, the senior Australian medical officer, Lieutenant Colonel (later Major General) Neville Howse, approved the attachment of John Henderson, a fourth year dental student, to deploy with them. Henderson later transferred to the infantry and was killed at Pozières in 1916, while serving as a captain in the 13th Battalion. He nevertheless has the distinction of being the first dentist to serve officially in the Army in that capacity.

Later, as the Australian Imperial Force (AIF) was raised, a dental officer was recruited and situated in each military district with the remit of providing advice to senior medical personnel. They were not to carry out dental procedures, however, and as a result civilian dentists offered free services to soldiers while undertaking training in Australia. Upon the AIF's arrival in Egypt in 1915, General William Throsby Bridges argued the case for dentists to be attached to the army in the field, stating that it would reduce the instances of soldiers having to be evacuated from the field as 'dental casualties'. While some progress towards mitigating this was taken in January 1915 when the Australian Army Medical Corps (Dental) Reserve was approved, appointments were slow and consequently the AIF troops that deployed to Gallipoli did so without dental support. Dental health became a serious problem for the Australian army on the Gallipoli Peninsula, contributing as early as June 1915 to a significant number of medical evacuations from the front lines. By July 1915, over 600 soldiers from the 1st Division alone had been evacuated as dental casualties.

Not only were dental health problems debilitating in their own way, but the makeshift supply system at the time was not able to provide rations that could be consumed by men with poor teeth, missing teeth or broken dental plates. Furthermore, the untreated dental caries (rotten teeth) lead to systemic infections and digestive problems. In spite of these official restrictions, battalion and brigade commanders had soon realised there was a glaring shortcoming. They had begun to recognise that they had dentists in their own ranks, who were then transferred by their infantry commanders to the field ambulance services attached to their own infantry formations, to work under the Regimental Medical Officers commanding those field ambulance units. Prior to this, dentists in the ranks had also been treating their own comrades as best they could. Some dentists had brought their own equipment, the Red Cross provided some, while some makeshift dental equipment was also adapted from medical equipment available on the Peninsula. However, once the severity of dental health problems had become apparent, the Australian Army Medical Corps began to transfer qualified men from other arms of the service into a makeshift, poorly equipped, but officially sanctioned, dental service under the command of the Australian Army Medical Service. It was not until 6 July 1915, well into the Gallipoli campaign, that this small dental service, officially staffed and equipped, had been established at Gallipoli within the Australian Army Order of Battle.

In June 1915, a strength of 39 personnel, consisting of 13 lieutenants and 26 senior non-commissioned officer and other ranks was authorised. In July 1915, six dental officers were dispatched overseas from Australia, while another four were appointed from personnel already stationed in Egypt. In December 1915 further progress was made when Howse, who was a firm believer in the requirement for dental personnel to provide for the needs of soldiers, was appointed Director General Medical Services AIF. In February 1916, a home establishment was created and the process of creating dental units began in April. Thirty-six dental units were formed at this time, and they were allotted between varying levels of medical facilities ranging from field ambulances to general hospitals and training bases. When the AIF divisions were transferred to France to fight on the Western Front, these units proceeded with the divisions, with three dental sections being allocated to each division and one unit to each field ambulance.

As the war progressed, the importance placed upon dental health within the AIF increased and by early 1917 stricter standards were being enforced on recruits and dental officers were given the power to require personnel to be paraded for dental inspections. Initially, the ranks held by dental officers were honorary, but in June 1917 these were made substantive. To improve the management of the service, staff officers were appointed to oversee the units in France, the United Kingdom and Egypt. By the end of the war, there were 130 dental officers serving overseas, representing a ratio of one dental officer per 4,250 men.

=== Inter war years ===
By 1920, the dental service had been demobilised. During the interwar years, the focus of Australia's military planning was upon maintaining a reduced permanent force with a larger part-time military force. The need for dental services was thus greatly reduced and, as a result, they were largely provided by civilian dentists that were also serving in the Militia, although a small number of permanent dental staff were retained on the establishment. Nevertheless, in 1928 an inspector of dental services was appointed, and although training opportunities were limited due to the economic hardships of the Great Depression, throughout the interwar years the service developed its capabilities and corporate knowledge through a series of tactical exercises.

=== World War II ===
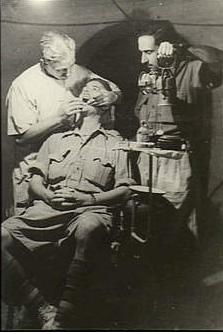
An Australian dental team works on a patient during the Siege of Tobruk, 1941.

Following the outbreak of World War II, the small number of full-time dental personnel were augmented by Militia officers and civilian volunteers. Although early enlistment was low, as part of the mobilisation process, in October 1939 provision was made for the establishment of dental units consisting of one dental officer, two dental mechanics and one clerk orderly, who were to be placed within three field ambulances, one casualty clearing station, two general hospitals and one convalescent depot. Initially, dental equipment and supplies were insufficient for the tasks required, with a single division requiring an estimated 50,000 fillings, 40,000 extractions and 10,000 dentures, however, personnel managed to overcome this through the acquisition of stores from local areas.

On 23 April 1943, authorisation was given for the service to split from the Medical Corps and for the formation of a separate corps known as the Australian Army Dental Corps. Upon the new corps' establishment, it was assigned a "burnt orange" hexagonal colour patch, however, this was later changed to a rectangular shape in November 1945. By 1944, the corps consisted of 435 dentists. Throughout the war, dental units were deployed alongside fighting troops into all theatres of operation in which Australians were deployed, including the Middle East and the Pacific, where they provided emergency treatment as close to the front line as possible, taking part in beach landings and also trekking overland on the Kokoda Track during the New Guinea campaign. On occasions dental supplies were dropped by parachute to forward units in the field. Within the operational setting the focus was almost exclusively on emergency treatment, however, and routine or preventative work was undertaken "only when the situation allowed".

By October 1945, the corps had personnel spread across the gamut of organisational structures within the Army, including at formation, corps, line of communication, base and depot levels. Dental officers were also placed on the hospital ships, Manunda and Wanganella. Following the end of the war, the corps was slowly reduced as the demobilisation process took place, however, their status as service troops meant that they were retained for longer as there was a requirement for demobilising soldiers from other corps to receive dental treatment prior to discharge. A number of advances in clinical practice occurred during the conflict, with the development of acrylic resin for the manufacture of dentures, the involvement of dental surgeons in facio-maxillary surgery as part of the treatment of soldiers suffering from facial trauma—including plastic surgery and the fitting of moulds for epithelial inlays and skin and bone grafts—as well as developments in the manufacture of artificial eyes.

=== Post war ===
During the post-war period, dental units were raised for service in Japan as part of the British Commonwealth Occupation Force in 1946. In 1948, Australia's part-time military force was re-raised under the guise of the Citizens Military Force (CMF), and dental units were raised in each State to provide support to CMF units. Regular Army units were also raised in each State, and at major training establishments. That year the corps gained Royal assent when they were granted the title of the Royal Australian Army Dental Corps in recognition of its service during the war. At this time the corps colour was changed to green, although it was changed back to burnt orange in 1961. Later, further Regular Army units were raised for overseas service during the Korean War, Confrontation and the Vietnam War.

Throughout the Cold War years, the corps was reorganised a number of times during 1960, 1970 and 1981; upon the adoption of the Pentropic divisional establishment individual units were assigned to divisions "on the basis of one unit per 5,000 troops", although they were not assigned as organic assets. Later, each division was allocated two dental units as organic assets; these were later combined into single units with a headquarters and 12 sections, equipped with light vehicles and trailers, and consisting of 14 officers and 42 soldiers of varying ranks. This represented a ratio of one section per 1,000 personnel.

Throughout the 1990s, the corps contributed to various peacekeeping operations, including those in Northern Iraq, Somalia, Rwanda, Bougainville and East Timor. In 1995, dental units became part of the medical companies that were established within brigade administrative support battalions (BASBs), which were formed through the amalgamation of field ambulance, dental and psych units. The BASBs later became known as combat service support battalions (CSSBs) in 2001. These units are augmented by base level facilities located in each State, which are maintained by tri-service and civilian staff. Due to advances within the basic level of dental fitness required of Australian Army personnel, the current focus of dental care provided by the corps is on prevention, in order to minimise the requirement for the evacuation of dental casualties, to conserve manpower and to reduce the burden of casualty evacuation.

== Order of precedence ==
Preceded by Royal Australian Army Medical Corps	Australian Army Order of Precedence	Succeeded by Royal Australian Army Ordnance Corps
