= 8th Field Ambulance (Australia) =

Australian Army medical sub-unit

- Casualties from the Battle of Suoi Chau Pha arriving at the 8th Field Ambulance, 1967
- Active: 1916–1919; 1942–1945; 1966–1972
- Country: Australia
- Branch: Australian Army
- Type: Medical
- Mascot: Vampire Bat
- Engagements: First World War: Western Front; Second World War: New Guinea campaign; Bougainville campaign; Vietnam War

The 8th Field Ambulance was a medical unit of the Australian Army. It was originally formed for service during World War I as part of the Australian Imperial Force, and served mainly on the Western Front between 1916 and 1918, before disbanding in early 1919. During World War II, the unit was re-raised as a Militia unit and served in Western Australia, New Guinea and Bougainville. During the Vietnam War, the unit served in Vung Tau in support of the 1st Australian Task Force between 1967 and 1968, before being disbanded in 1972. The unit's designation is now perpetuated by one for the 1st Close Health Battalion's close health companies.

== History ==
The 8th Field Ambulance was first formed during World War I, being raised in Egypt in January 1916, when the Australian Imperial Force was expanded following the unsuccessful Gallipoli Campaign. Assigned to the 8th Brigade, 5th Division, the 8th Field Ambulance was subsequently deployed to the Western Front. Responsible for providing second line evacuation from regimental aid posts that were deployed forward with the attacking troops, to casualty clearing stations, Australian field ambulances at the time consisted of 10 officers and 224 other ranks and were organised into a headquarters and two company-sized sub-divisions known as the "tent sub-division" and the "bearer sub-division".

The unit's first major battle came during the disastrous Battle of Fromelles in July 1916, after which it served throughout the remainder of the war supporting the 8th Brigade's operations in France and Belgium. The unit's last war diary entry was made in March 1919, after which it was disbanded.

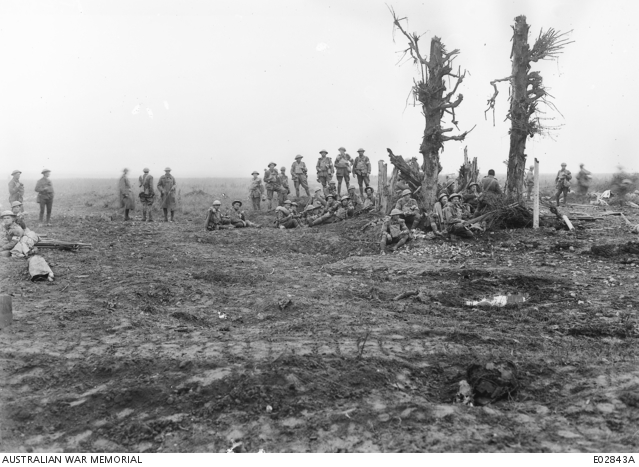
Stretcher bearers from the 8th Field Ambulance during the final Allied offensive of World War I, August 1918

During the Second World War, the 8th Field Ambulance was re-raised as a Militia unit in Geraldton, Western Australia, in 1942. It later deployed on active service during the New Guinea and Bougainville Campaigns. Another unit with a similar designation, the 2/8th Field Ambulance, was also raised within the Second Australian Imperial Force; this unit was formed mainly from South Australian volunteers and served with the 9th Division during the North African campaign, including the siege of Tobruk in 1941, before later serving during the Huon Peninsula campaign, and the Borneo campaign.

In early April 1966, the unit was re-raised with the intent to deploy to South Vietnam as part of Australia's contribution to the Vietnam War, and was based initially at Puckapunyal, Victoria. The unit was staffed primarily by Citizens Military Force (CMF) medical officers on full-time service. A year-long period of training followed before the unit finally deployed, arriving at Vung Tau in late April 1967, and taking over from the 2nd Field Ambulance. Forming part of the 1st Australian Logistic Support Group, the unit's main force of about 100 personnel established a field hospital at Vung Tau capable of supporting about 50 patients. A smaller team of around platoon-strength deployed forward inland, working directly with the 1st Australian Task Force's deployed infantry battalions. In 1968, the field hospital was redesignated the 1st Australian Field Hospital as the medical services in Vietnam were expanded, although the forward medical detachment retained the 8th Field Ambulance designation. It was subsequently disbanded in 1972 following the conclusion of its tour.

== Perpetuation ==
The 8th Field Ambulance's numerical designation is perpetuated by the 8th Close Health Company (8 CHC), which formed part of the 1st Close Health Battalion. This sub-unit was assigned to the 17th Sustainment Brigade and was previously designated the 1st Health Support Battalion. 8 CHC was formed in 2011 from the 1st Combat Service Support Battalion's (1 CSSB) health company, following a restructure of Army health elements, which resulted in the CSSBs losing their integral health companies. The 1st Close Health Battalion was then disbanded in 2021 and re-raised as the 1st Health Battalion which now falls under 2nd Brigade following the health restructure. 8CHC still exists under the 1st Health Battalion and is currently based in Darwin and provides close health support to the 1st Brigade.
