= Keswick Barracks =

Keswick Military Barracks
- Anzac Highway, Keswick, Adelaide, South Australia

Site information
- Type: Army barracks
- Controlled by: Australian Army

Location
- Coordinates: 34.94609°S 138.58189°E

Keswick Barracks is a barracks of the Australian Army in Keswick, South Australia. The barracks are located on Anzac Highway adjacent to the Adelaide Showground. The base is separated from the showgrounds by the Adelaide-Wolseley railway line.

The barracks' historic Headquarters Building is listed on both the Australian Commonwealth Heritage List and the former Register of the National Estate. The barracks is also home to the Army Museum of South Australia.

== Current units ==
- Headquarters 9th Brigade
- 10th/27th Battalion, Royal South Australia Regiment
- 3rd Health Support Battalion
- 144 Signals Squadron
- 47 Army Cadet Unit
- 413 Army Cadet Unit (Pipes & Drums).
- 601 Squadron Australian Air Force Cadets
- 617 Squadron Australian Air Force Cadets

== Previous Units ==
- 48th Field Battery
