= 2nd Health Battalion =

Medical unit of the Australian Army

- Active: 2022 - Today
- Country: Australia
- Branch: Army
- Type: Combat health support
- Role: Health Support
- Size: One battalion
- Part of: 2nd Brigade (Australia)
- Garrison/HQ: Gallipoli Barracks
- Mottos: Non Sui Sed Aliis - Not for self, but others
- Colors: Brown and Red
- Mascot: Viper / Serpent
- Anniversaries: 1 March

Commanders
- Commanding Officer: LTCOL
- Regimental Sergeant Major: WO1 Ashley McDonald

Insignia
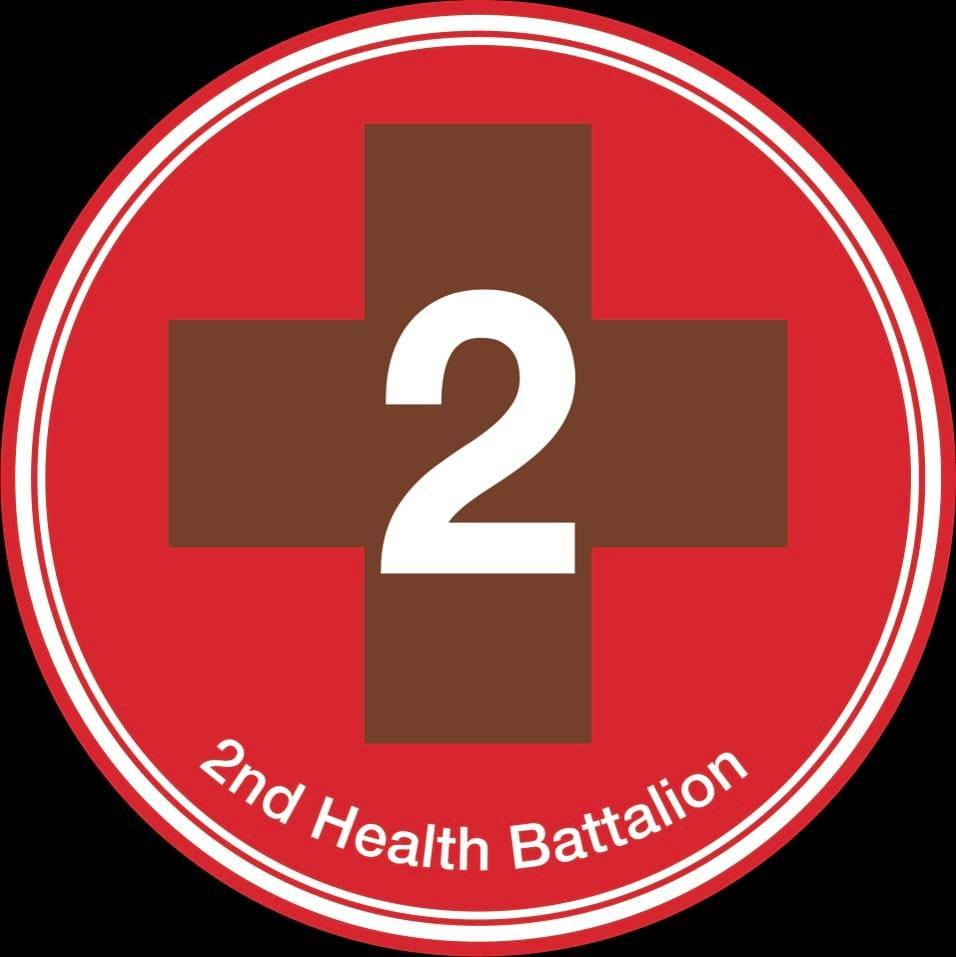
- 2nd Health Battalion: 2nd Health Battalion - Brisbane

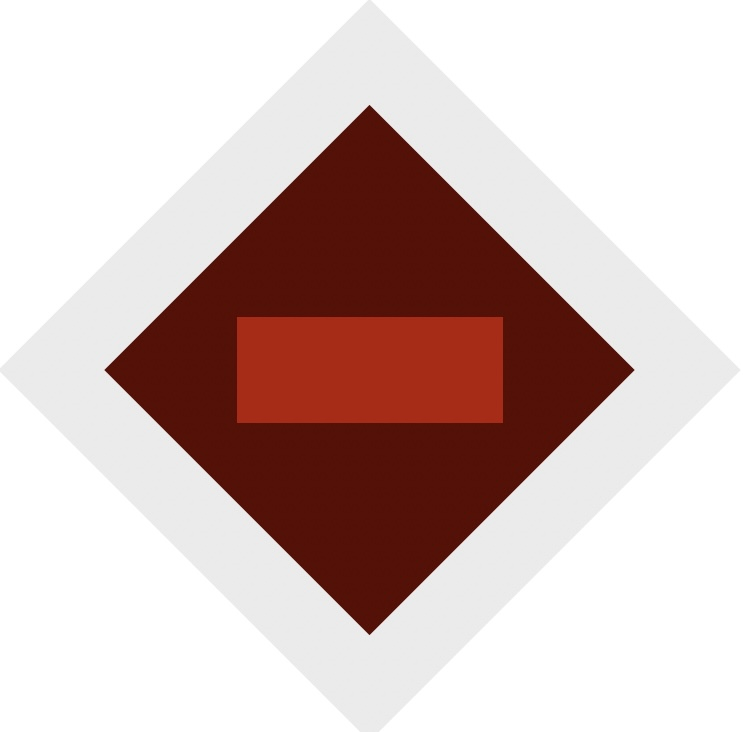
- Unit colour patch: The Colour Identification Patch of the 2nd Health Battalion.

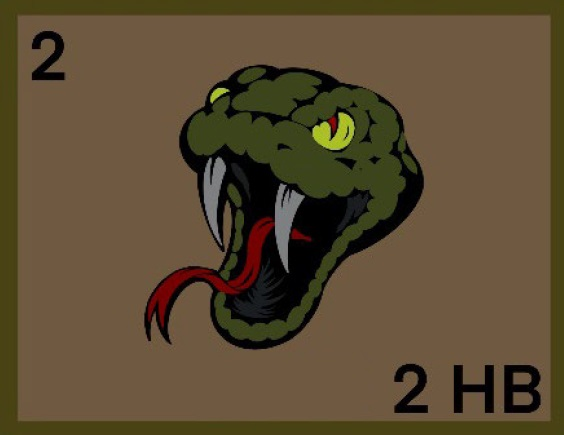
- Unit Field Patch: 2HB Unit Field Patch

The 2nd Health Battalion (2HB) is an Australian Army unit of the 2nd Health Brigade. It is primarily based at Gallipoli Barracks in Enoggera, Queensland, however Delta Company is located in Sydney, Newcastle and Canberra supporting NSW and ACT. The battalion is a rapidly deployable unit to provide support across the entire land based trauma system. This included integral, evacuation, initial wound surgery, resuscitation, damage control resuscitation and medium to high intensity nursing care, (surgical resuscitation) in the area of operations.

The battalion was raised as the 2nd Health Support Battalion on 1 November 2000 from the 2nd Field Hospital, the Dental Unit of the Defence Corporate Support Office in Brisbane and the 4th Preventive Medicine Company. In November 2011, the battalion was renamed the 2nd General Health Battalion.

The battalion consisted of two surgical companies, a logistical support company, a preventative medical company, a dental company, a shock trauma platoon and a battalion headquarters.

In February 2022, following the disbandment of 2GHB as part of the Army's restructure of its health battalions, four new health battalions were formed that were to be placed under the command of the 2nd Health Brigade.

Following the Health restructure, 2nd Health Battalion formally expanded its Close Health and Allied Health Support capability further bolstering its previously existing General Health assets.

On the 3rd of March 2023, the 4 Australian Army Health Battalions were placed under the central command of 2nd Health Brigade with the intent to establish a central health command and unify the 4 battalions across Australia.

== Alpha Company (1st Surgical Company) ==
Alpha Company (A Coy) is responsible for the generation of the Role 2 Forward and Role 2 Enhanced deployable capabilities.

The 2nd Health Battalion's Role 2 Forward capability is a critical component of military health support. It is designed to provide advanced medical care close to the front lines in a combat or operational environment. This includes resuscitation, stabilisation, damage control surgery, and the management of trauma and non-trauma cases. The Role 2 Forward facility is equipped with essential medical equipment, surgical capabilities, and diagnostic tools to deliver immediate life-saving interventions. Additionally, it supports casualty triage, basic laboratory services, limited patient holding, and preparation for evacuation to higher-level care facilities if needed. The 2nd Health Battalion's Role 2 Forward is capable of conducting up to 18 surgical cases without resupply.

The 2nd Health Battalion's Role 2 Enhanced (R2E) capability provides advanced medical support to deployed military forces. This includes comprehensive trauma care, surgical interventions, intensive care units, laboratory diagnostics, imaging services, and short-term patient holding facilities. Designed for rapid deployment and mobility, the R2E ensures that critically injured personnel receive timely, life-saving treatment close to the operational area, significantly enhancing survival rates and overall mission effectiveness.

== Bravo Company (11th Close Health Company) ==
Bravo Company (B Coy) is responsible with the Integral health, evacuation and Role 1 treatment support to units of 7 Brigade and that of wider Eastern Australia inclusive of NSW and ACT.

Founded March 1, 1916 as the then 11th Field Ambulance as part of the Third Australian Division. Its primary function was to provide medical support to troops in the field during World War I.

It since undertook several name changes becoming now known as Bravo Company, with the 11th Close Health Company name still being used as a referencing title. The Company still serves a role near identical to that of a hundred years ago.

== Charlie Company (Operational Support Company) ==
Charlie Company (C Coy) provides logistical, technical, and allied health support including dental, preventative medicine, psychological, physiotherapy, physical training, and veterinary services both within the unit and to external supported dependencies. The company manages supply chains for medical equipment and pharmaceuticals, maintains and transports medical facilities, and conducts hazard assessments to supply medical personnel across various environments.

Additionally, the Charlie Company handles the coordination and execution of deployment and redeployment of medical assets, vehicle maintenance, and the provision of communications and IT support necessary for the smooth functioning of medical operations. The company's role is crucial in maintaining the operational readiness of the 2nd Health Battalion, enabling it to deliver continuous and reliable medical care in support of military missions.

== Delta Company (1/5 Close Health Company) ==
Delta Company (D Coy) of the 2nd Health Battalion is located in Sydney, Canberra and Newcastle and is a specialised sub-unit focused on delivering comprehensive medical support in domestic and operational settings. This company (made up primarily of SERCAT 5 members) includes a mix of medical professionals such as doctors, nurses, medics, and support staff, all trained to operate in high-intensity environments. Delta Company is often responsible for establishing and operating Role 1 medical facilities, which provide initial emergency care, triage, and stabilisation of casualties close to the front lines.

In addition to Role 1 care, Delta Company may also be involved in the setup and operation of more advanced Role 2 Basic medical facilities, offering surgical and resuscitative care. The company is designed to be highly mobile and capable of deploying rapidly in support of military operations, ensuring that injured personnel receive timely and effective medical treatment. Delta Company's expertise and flexibility make it a key component of the 2nd Health Battalion's overall mission to provide robust health support to the Australian Defence Force.

History of Delta Company was the amalgamation of medical companys from the 8th and 5th Combat Service Support Battalion (CSSB) which were previously known as the 8th and 5th Brigade Admin Support Battalion (BASB) and historically as the 1st Field Ambulance (8) and 5th Field Ambulance (5).
