= January 1915 =

Month of 1915

<<	January 1915					>>
Su	Mo	Tu	We	Th	Fr	Sa
					1	2
3	4	5	6	7	8	9
10	11	12	13	14	15	16
17	18	19	20	21	22	23
24	25	26	27	28	29	30
31

Endurance trapped in pack ice during the Imperial Trans-Antarctic Expedition.

The following events occurred in January 1915:

== January 1, 1915 (Friday) ==
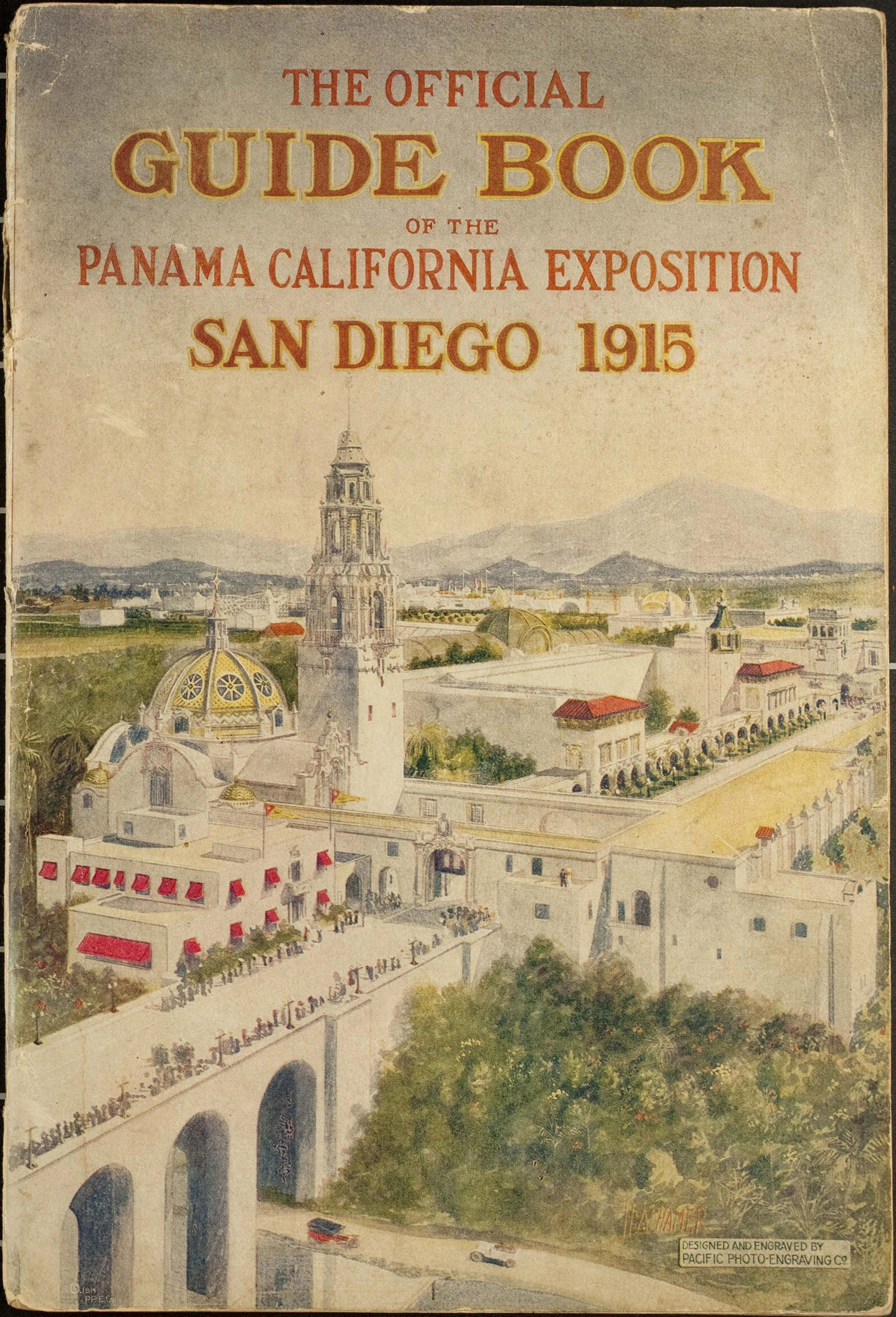
Official guide book of the 1915–1916 Panama–California Exposition.

- The Royal Navy battleship HMS Formidable was sunk off Lyme Regis, Dorset, England, by an Imperial German Navy U-boat with the loss of 547 crew.
- Luis Cabrera Lobato, aide to Mexican president Venustiano Carranza, released a decree on land reform in Mexico, promising to provide land to those with the most need.
- The Panama–California Exposition officially opened in San Diego with U.S. President Woodrow Wilson ceremoniously pushing a telegraph button in Washington, D.C. that turned on the power and lights at the park. The exposition, which celebrated the opening of the Panama Canal, would host 3.7 million visitors over the next two years.
- Charles Seymour Whitman became the 41st Governor of New York which he would serve until 1918.
- Toronto held a municipal election with Thomas Langton Church defeating Jesse McCarthy after incumbent mayor Horatio Clarence Hocken chose not to run. Church received over 26,000 votes while McCarthy had over 19,500.
- Battle of Broken Hill — A train ambush near Broken Hill, New South Wales, Australia, was carried out by Mullah Abdullah and Gool Badsha Mahomed (claiming to be in support of the Ottoman Empire) who were killed together with four civilians.
- The Ilford rail crash in Essex, England killed ten people and injured another 500 passengers.
- The Royal Flying Corps established the No. 8 Squadron at Saint-Omer, France and the No. 10 Squadron at Farnborough Airport, Farnborough, Hampshire, England.
- The II Corps of the Imperial German Army was disbanded when its headquarters was upgraded to become part of the South Army on the Eastern Front.
- Pilot Vivian Walsh flew a Curtiss-type flying boat at Bastion Point, New Zealand, the first time such an aircraft was flown in the Southern Hemisphere.
- Harry Houdini performed a straitjacket escape performance.
- The Mumbai Port Trust Railway opened for public use, becoming a critical railroad of the Allies during World War II.
- The Arkansas State Capitol was completed to house the Arkansas General Assembly in Little Rock, Arkansas.
- The Sacramento Northern Railway opened the Dixon Branch rail line between Sacramento and Dixon, California.
- The Yōrō Railway extended the Yōrō Line in the Gifu Prefecture, Japan, with stations Karasue serving the line. As well, the Iksan Station was opened on the original Honam rail line in Iksan, Korea.
- The railway station in Whitstable, England, was closed as a wartime measure.
- The Tennōji Zoo opened to the public in Tennōji-ku, Osaka, Japan.
- The sports alliance club Kristiania BK was founded through a merger of three separate clubs to provide association football, Nordic skiing, and bandy to Kristiania, Norway. The club took on another club in 1925 becoming Skeid, but still retained many of the club colors established in 1915.
- Edøy Municipality, Norway was divided up three ways to allow the creation of Brattvær Municipality and Hopen Municipality (and a smaller Edøy Municipality). All three were reunited again in 1960 as Smøla Municipality.
- Born: Branko Ćopić, Bosnian writer, known for such works as Eagles Fly Early; in Hašani, Austria-Hungary (present-day Bosnia and Herzegovina) (suicide, 1984)

== January 2, 1915 (Saturday) ==
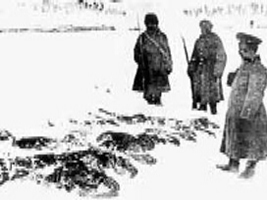
Russians collecting the frozen bodies of Turkish soldiers during the Battle of Sarikamish.

- Russia began a major offensive against Austria-Hungary in the Carpathian Mountains that bordered between the two empires on the Eastern Front.
- Battle of Sarikamish — Russian artillery inflicted further casualties on Ottoman forces to the point all commanders reported in they were too weak to attack. Although initially insisting the offensive continue at "full strength", Ottoman Minister of War Enver Pasha switched tactics to secure retreat routes by combining two Ottoman corps into a "left wing army."
- Grand Duke Nicholas, commander of the Russian Empire's armed forces, appealed to Great Britain to assist Russia in fighting the Ottoman Empire, setting the stage for the Dardanelles and Gallipoli campaign.
- The 31st Indian Brigade of the British Indian Army was established for service in Egypt.
- The drama The Italian, directed by Reginald Barker and debuted acclaimed stage actor George Beban to the film screen, depicted the struggles of an Italian immigrant in Manhattan's Lower East Side in New York City. The film was selected for preservation by the National Film Registry.
- Born: John Hope Franklin, American historian, specialized in African-American history showcased in his 1947 best-seller From Slavery to Freedom; in Rentiesville, Oklahoma, United States (d. 2009)

== January 3, 1915 (Sunday) ==
- Battle of Sarikamish — Ottoman forces were driven out to the Choruk Valley in the Caucasus region while other forces attacked the Russian line to relieve the pressure on Ottoman soldiers positioned in front of the city of Sarikamish.
- The national teams of Catalonia and Basque played their first recorded game in Bilbao, Spain, with Basque beating Catalan 6–1.
- The association football club Lanús was formed in Lanús, Buenos Aires Province, Argentina from the merger of two earlier clubs, although the actual name wouldn't be chosen until January 27.
- Born:
  - John N. Dempsey, Irish-American politician, 81st Governor of Connecticut; in Cahir, Ireland (d. 1989)
  - Chetan Anand, Indian film director, known for films including Neecha Nagar; in Lahore, British India (present-day India) (d. 1997)

== January 4, 1915 (Monday) ==
- Battle of Sarikamish — Ottoman commander Hafiz Hakki Pasha toured the front line and concluded Ottoman forces would be unable to defend the line, after which he suggested headquarters give the order to fully retreat.
- Princess Patricia's Canadian Light Infantry became the first Canadian troops sent to the front lines of the Western Front.
- British submarine HMS C31 struck a mine off the Belgian coast and sank with all 16 crewmen on board.
- Duchesne County, Utah was established with its country seat in Duchesne.
- Born:
  - Marie-Louise von Franz, German-Swiss psychologist, best known for applying psychological interpretations to fairy tales and alchemy manuscripts; in Munich, German Empire (present-day Germany) (d. 1998)
  - Adolf Opálka, Czech soldier, member of the resistance group Out Distance during World War II and member of Operation Anthropoid; in Rešice, Austria-Hungary (present-day Czech Republic) (killed in action, 1942)
- Died: Anton von Werner, 71, German painter, best known for his paintings on modern German history including Martin Luthor at Worms and Proclamation of the German Empire at Versailles (b. 1843)

== January 5, 1915 (Tuesday) ==
- Second Battle of Edea — A force of 1,000 German colonial forces failed to recapture the village of Edéa on the Sanaga River from the French in what is now Cameroon.
- The British Army established the 188th Brigade.
- Joseph E. Carberry set an altitude record of 11,690 feet (3,560 m), carrying Capt. Benjamin Delahauf Foulois as a passenger in a fixed-wing aircraft.
- Nippon Railway extended the Tōhoku Main Line in the Iwate Prefecture, Japan, with station Senbokuchō serving the line.
- Born:
  - Arthur H. Robinson, Canadian-American geographer and cartographer, developed the Robinson projection to show the map of the entire world on a 2-D surface; in Montreal, Canada (d. 2004)
  - Mel Gabler, American activist, co-founder of the Educational Research Analysts with wife Norma to promote social conservativism in public education; as Melvin Nolan Freeman Gabler, in Katy, Texas, United States (d. 2004)

== January 6, 1915 (Wednesday) ==
- Battle of Sarikamish — Russian forces advanced far enough it could fire on the headquarters of the Ottoman Third Army and captured entire divisions, including eight senior officers. Captives transferred to Sarikamish included 108 officers and 80 soldiers. Campaign commander Hafiz Hakki Pasha eluded capture and reached main headquarters where he formally ordered a full retreat.
- The first and only attempt to use submarines to carry seaplanes was made by German submarine U-12 which lashed a Friedrichshafen seaplane to her deck before departing from Zeebrugge for a strike on England. The seaplane was forced to take off early during a reconnoiter off the coast of Kent and fly all the way back to Zeebrugge when bad weather made returning to the sub impossible.
- Public sentiment in Italy to enter World War I grew exponentially following a state funeral for a fallen officer of the Garibaldi Legion, a volunteer unit of 2,000 Italians fighting for France. An estimated 300,000 people attended including ambassadors from France, Great Britain, Russia, Belgium and Serbia. The unit, under command of Peppino who was also brother to the deceased and grandson to Giuseppe Garibaldi, were involved in the first and second battles for Argonne Forest and sustained 700 casualties before dissolving in March. Many of the Legion veterans enlisted in other Italian units when Italy formally entered the war in May.
- The Plan of San Diego was drafted in the Texas town of the same name, with the intention of creating civil unrest that would lead to "[freeing] Texas, New Mexico, Arizona, California, and Colorado from U.S. control". The actual authors of the plan were unknown but the signatures on the plan document were from rebels being held inside a jail in Monterrey, Mexico.
- The 59th Infantry Division of the British Army was established.
- Shinano Railway began operating the Ōito Line in the Nagano Prefecture, Japan, with stations Kita-Matsumoto, Azusabashi, Hitoichiba and Toyoshina serving the line.
- Born:
  - Alan Watts, British-American philosopher, specializing in Zen Buddhism, author of The Way of Zen; in Chislehurst, England (d. 1973)
  - Ibolya Csák, Hungarian field athlete, gold medalist at the 1936 Summer Olympics; in Budapest, Austria-Hungary (present-day Hungary) (d. 2006)
  - Tom Ferrick, American baseball player, relief pitcher for various Major League teams including the New York Yankees, 1950 World Series champion; as Thomas Ferrick, in New York City, United States (d. 1996)

== January 7, 1915 (Thursday) ==
- Battle of Sarikamish — Remaining Ottoman forces began to retreat towards Erzurum in eastern Turkey.
- Italy established the Corpo Aeronautico Militare (Military Aviation Corps) as air force branch of the Royal Italian Army.
- The German city of Hamburg reached its January 1915 precipitation peak, at 1.5 centimeters.
- Born: George W. Comstock, American physician, leading captain of the United States Public Health Service from 1942 to 1963; in Niagara Falls, New York, United States (d. 2007)

== January 8, 1915 (Friday) ==
- The military collier ship Teodo was launched by Stabilimento Tecnico Triestino in Trieste, and would serve the Austro-Hungarian Navy until the end of World War I.
- H.G. Bellinger of the Princess Patricia's Canadian Light Infantry was killed at Ypres, the first Canadian casualty in World War I.
- Born: Walker Cooper, American baseball player, catcher for six Major League teams including the St. Louis Cardinals from 1940 to 1957, two-time 1942 and 1944 World Series champion; as William Walker Cooper, in Atherton, Missouri, United States (d. 1991)

== January 9, 1915 (Saturday) ==
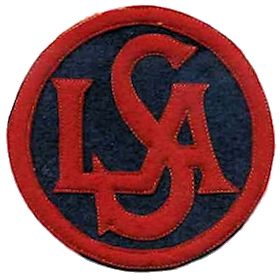
Badge of the Lone Scouts of America.

- Members of the German navy landing party that were stranded in Cocos Islands in the Indian Ocean after their command ship SMS Emden was damaged and beached during the Battle of Cocos finally reached the Middle Eastern port city Hodeida (now Al Hudaydah, Yemen) after hitch-hiking on a freighter.
- The Woman's Peace Party was established at an organizational convention held in Washington, D.C. With over 100 delegates attending, Jane Addams was elected as president.
- Newspaper publisher William D. Boyce founded the Lone Scouts of America, which existed parallel with the Boy Scouts of America until merging in 1924. It reported 30,000 members during its first year of activity.
- Born:
  - Anita Louise, American actress, best known for her performances in A Midsummer Night's Dream, The Story of Louis Pasteur, and Anthony Adverse; as Anita Louise Fremault, in New York City, United States (d. 1970)
  - Fernando Lamas, Argentine-American actor, known for his romantic film roles in Rich, Young and Pretty and The Law and the Lady, father to actor Lorenzo Lamas; as Fernando Álvaro Lamas y de Santos, in Buenos Aires, Argentina (d. 1982)
  - Herbert Huncke, American poet, credited for coining the term "Beat Generation", author of Guilty of Everything; in Greenfield, Massachusetts, United States (d. 1996)

== January 10, 1915 (Sunday) ==
- The Royal Flying Corps established the No. 13 Squadron at Gosport, South Hampshire, England.
- The British polar exploration ship Endurance, carrying explorer Ernest Shackleton and the rest of the Imperial Trans-Antarctic Expedition crew, arrived to meet 100-foot (30 m) ice walls which guarded the Antarctic coastal region of Coats Land.
- The Stark Street Bridge opened to traffic near Troutdale, Oregon.
- Born: Mervyn Brogan, Australian army officer, Chief of the Australian Army from 1971 to 1973, recipient of the Order of the British Empire and Order of the Bath; in Crows Nest, New South Wales, Australia (d. 1994)
- Died: Marshall Pinckney Wilder, 55, American actor known for his dwarfism; died from heart disease complicated by pneumonia (b. 1859)

== January 11, 1915 (Monday) ==
- Raid on the Suez Canal — Forces with the Ottoman Fourth Army under command of German General Friedrich Freiherr Kress von Kressenstein numbering some 20,000 soldiers began assembling in southern Palestine. The Force in Egypt received word there was an Ottoman presence on the Sinai Peninsula.
- Battle of Sarikamish — The remains of the Ottoman Third Army reached Erzurum in eastern Turkey only to learn reinforcements would not arrive after a Russian naval squadron in the Black Sea sunk the army's military transports.
- The German South Army was formed to fight Russia on the Eastern Front. It was dissolved in 1918.
- The Parton Halt railway station began to receive workers from the Whitehaven railway station to an isolated colliery near Lowca, England.
- Born:
  - Arthur F. Gorham, American army officer, commander of the 505th Infantry Regiment of the 82nd Airborne Division during World War II, two-time recipient of the Distinguished Service Cross; in New York City, United States (killed in action during the Allied invasion of Sicily, 1943)
  - Paddy Mayne, Irish soldier, co-founder of the Special Air Service, recipient of the Distinguished Service Order and Legion of Honour; as Robert Blair Mayne, in Newtownards, Ireland (d. 1955)
- Died: Mewa Singh Lopoke, 33, Sikh-Canadian activist, member of the Ghadar Party and murderer of immigration officer William C. Hopkinson during the aftermath of the Komagata Maru incident; executed by hanging (b. 1881)

== January 12, 1915 (Tuesday) ==
- The United States House of Representatives voted 204–174 to reject a proposal for giving women the right to vote.
- Carlos Meléndez became president of El Salvador by acclamation when no other candidates ran in the presidential election.
- A Fool There Was premiered in the United States starring Theda Bara as a femme fatale; she quickly became one of early cinema's most sensational stars. However, the British Board of Film Censors barred the film from being shown in Great Britain because of its depiction of an illicit sexual relationship.
- Born:
  - Martin Agronsky, American journalist, host of television news program Agronsky & Company; as Martin Zama Agrons, in Philadelphia, United States (d. 1999)
  - Margaret Danner, American poet, member of the Boone House Group in Detroit, first African-American editor of Poetry; in Pryorsburg, Kentucky, United States (d. 1984)

== January 13, 1915 (Wednesday) ==
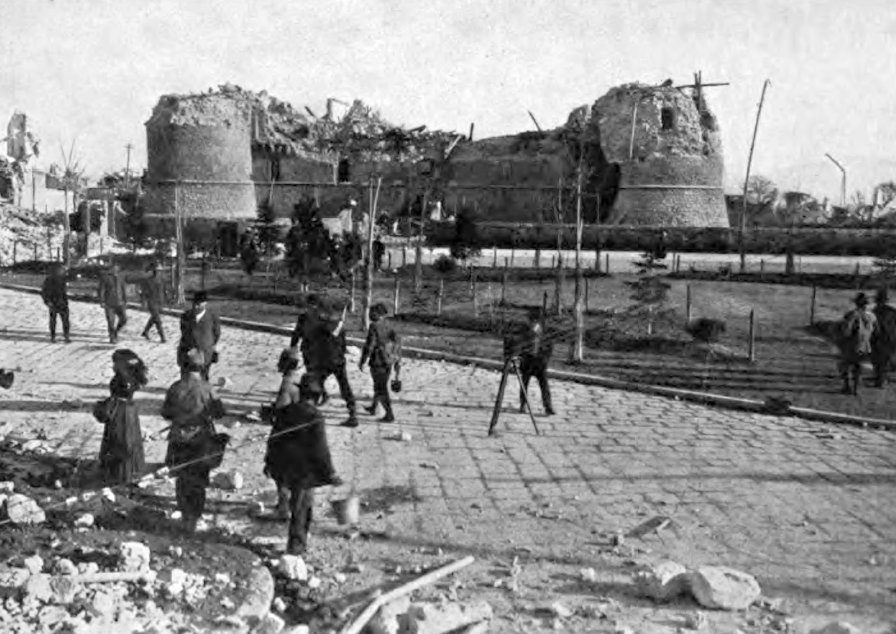
Ruins of Castle Orsini, Avezzano, Italy following an earthquake.

- An earthquake in Avezzano, Italy, registering 6.8 on the Richter magnitude scale killed more than 30,000 people.
- The First Battle of Artois ended with France still unable to break its stalemate with Germany on the Western Front.
- The British auxiliary cruiser HMS Viknor struck a mine in the Atlantic Ocean off Tory Island, County Donegal, Ireland, and sank with the loss of all 295 crew.
- Raid on the Suez Canal — The Force in Egypt received intelligence Ottoman columns were moving along the Sinai coastline towards the Suez Canal.
- German submarine SM U-31 went missing while on patrol in the North Sea. It was believed the sub had struck a mine off the east coast of Great Britain and sank with the loss of all 31 crew.
- Captain H. C. McNeile, an officer with the Royal Engineers, published his story in the series "Reminiscences of Sergeant Michael Cassidy", in the Daily Mail (London) under the pseudonym "Sapper".
- Born:
  - Taddy Aycock, American politician, 45th Lieutenant Governor of Louisiana; as Clarence C. Aycock, in Franklin, Louisiana, United States (d. 1987)
  - Jenny Lou Carson, American country singer and songwriter, first woman to write a country hit song ("You Two-Timed Me One Time Too Often"); as Virginia Lucille Overstake, in Decatur, Illinois, United States (d. 1978)
  - Raymond G. Davis, American marine corps officer, commander of the 1st Battalion, 7th Marines during the Korean War and commander of the Operation Dewey Canyon during the Vietnam War, recipient of the Medal of Honor and Navy Cross; in Fitzgerald, Georgia, United States (d. 2003)
- Died:
  - Robert G. Shaver, 83, American army officer, served with the Confederate States Army during the American Civil War, member of Ku Klux Klan (b. 1831)
  - Mary Slessor, Scottish Christian missionary, known for her missionary work and promoting women's and children's rights in Nigeria; died from fever (b. 1848)

== January 14, 1915 (Thursday) ==
- Royal Navy battleship Resolution was launched by Palmers Shipbuilding and Iron Company in Jarrow, England, to serve the Grand Fleet during World War I.
- The Mutual Alliance Trust Company, founded by Cornelius Vanderbilt and William Rockefeller in New York City, was acquired by the Chatham Phenix National Bank and Trust Company of New York.
- Association football club Eureka was established in Barracas, Buenos Aires, Argentina.
- Slope County, North Dakota was established, with its county seat in Amidon.
- Born: Mark Goodson, American television game show producer, with Bill Todman produced many longest-running game shows for American television including The Price Is Right, Family Feud, and Match Game; in Sacramento, California, United States (d. 1992)
- Died: Richard Meux Benson, 89, English clergy, founder of the Anglican religious order Society of St. John the Evangelist (b. 1824)

== January 15, 1915 (Friday) ==
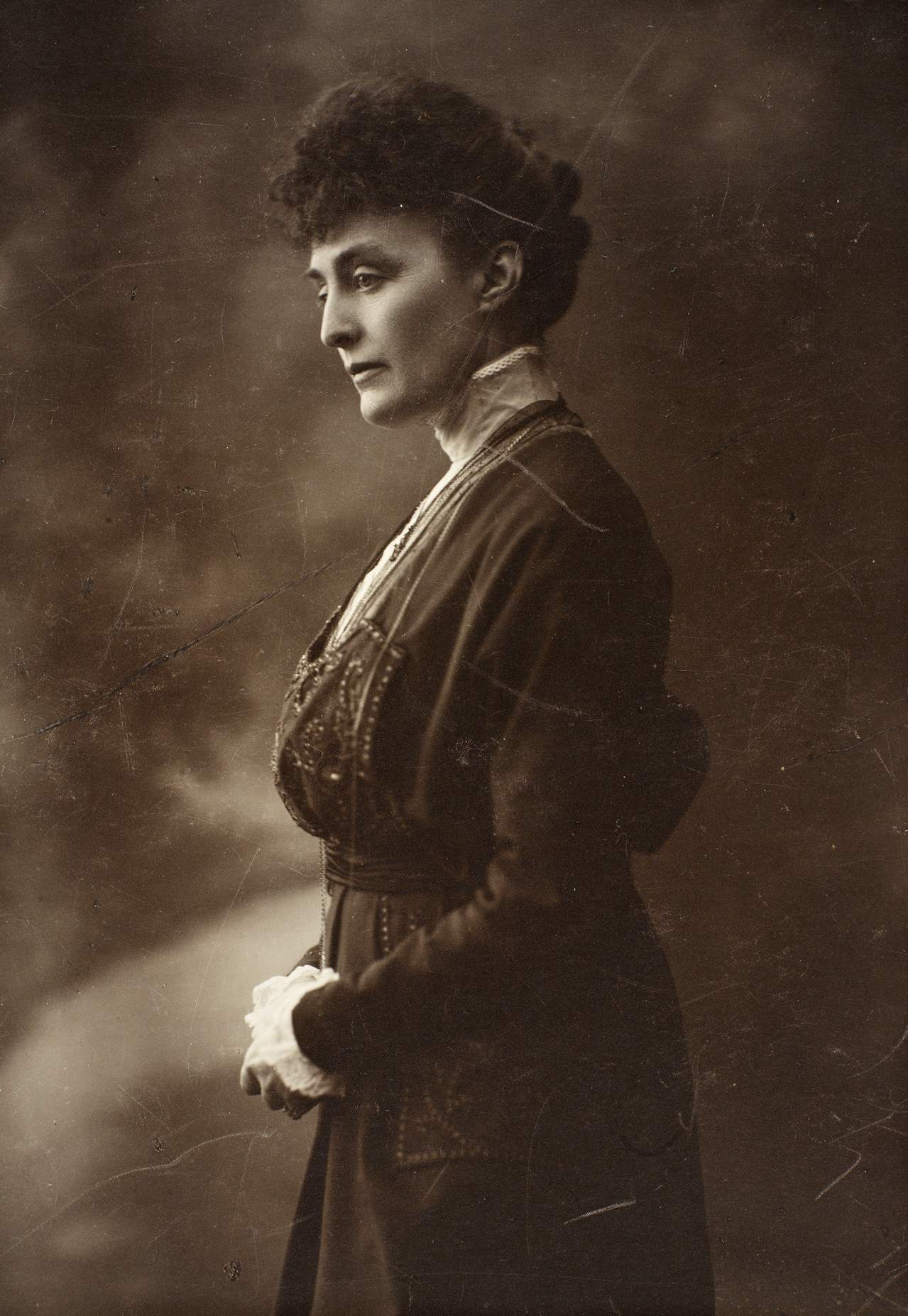
Katti Anker Møller

- The British War Council approved plans proposed by Winston Churchill, First Lord of the Admiralty, to open a new front on the Ottoman Empire at the Gallipoli peninsula using British, Australian and New Zealand forces stationed in Egypt.
- French submarine Saphir was sunk in the Dardanelles with the loss of fourteen of her 27 crew.
- U.S. Navy destroyer USS Cushing was launched at the Fore River Shipyard in Quincy, Massachusetts, by sponsor Miss M. L. Cushing, daughter of the ship's namesake, William B. Cushing, the U.S. naval officer best known for sinking the Confederate ironclad warship Albemarle during the American Civil War.
- British Home Secretary Herbert Samuel drafted the memorandum titled The Future of Palestine which outlined the benefits of Great Britain supporting Zionism and the push for a permanent Jewish state in Palestine.
- Norwegian feminist Katti Anker Møller delivered a ground-breaking lecture in Oslo on reproductive rights and decriminalizing abortion in Norway, stating "The basis for all freedom is the governance over one's own body and everything that is in it. The opposite is the condition of a slave."
- British polar exploration ship Endurance came upon a massive glacier on the Antarctic coast. While the edge formed a bay that provided a good landing place for the land expedition party, leading explorer Ernest Shackleton considered it too far north of Vahsel Bay where he had intended for landing and would only consider under pressure of necessity".
- Japanese Government Railways extended the Kisarazu rail line in the Chiba Prefecture, Japan, with stations Aohori, Susai, Ōnuki, Sanukimachi, and Kazusa-Minato serving the line. As well, the Tōkaidō Main Line was extended in the Shizuoka Prefecture with stations Araimachi and Washizu serving the line.
- The horror film The Golem, based on a supernatural creature from Jewish folklore, was released. Paul Wegener and Henrik Galeen wrote and directed the film as well as appearing in it (with Wegner as the golem). Wegner would produce two more films featuring the creature, although only the third film survived in its complete form.
- Labor activist Ralph Chaplin completed the trade union anthem "Solidarity Forever" in time to tribute the anniversary of the Paint Creek Mine War in 1912. The song since then has become a popular cover for folk singers such as Pete Seeger and Utah Phillips.
- Born: Maria Lenk, Brazilian Olympic swimmer, held over five Master World Records for breaststroke; in São Paulo, Brazil (d. 2007)
- Died: George Nares, 83, British naval officer and explorer, leader of the Challenger polar expedition from 1872 to 1876 (b. 1831)

== January 16, 1915 (Saturday) ==
- Ross Sea party — British polar ship Aurora arrived at the Ross Ice Shelf in the Antarctic and established a shore base at Cape Evans. The ship was a component of the Imperial Trans-Antarctic Expedition under command of Aeneas Mackintosh that was to lay out a series of supply depots across the ice shelf for the main polar expedition under command of Ernest Shackleton.
- King Constantine established the Order of George in honor of his father for Greek citizens that has given exceptional public service to Greece. The decoration was abolished twice and in 1973 replaced with the Order of Honour.
- Born: Susan Ahn Cuddy, Korean-American naval officer, first gunnery officer of the U.S. Navy, daughter of activist Ahn Changho; as Susan Ahn, in Los Angeles, United States (d. 2015)

== January 17, 1915 (Sunday) ==
- Battle of Sarikamish — The remaining Ottoman soldiers that had attempted to capture Sarikamish were rounded up in the woods outside the city while the Choruk Valley in the Caucasus region was cleared out of Ottoman troops. The battle officially ended with the Ottoman Empire in defeat. The Ottoman Third Army was reduced to 42,000 men from 118,000, with casualties ranging from 50,000 to 60,000, including 7,000 imprisoned soldiers and 200 captured officers. Russian forces sustained 16,000 casualties, along with another 12,000 men lost to sickness, including exposure and frostbite.
- Rival Arab royal houses Āl Rashīd and Āl Saʻūd clashed at the Battle of Jarrab north of Al Majma'ah. The battle resulted in victory of the Āl Rashīd but the only recorded casualty was British military adviser William Shakespear, who came in contact with Ibn Saud, the head of Āl Saʻūd, in the early 1900s. His death resulted in tensions between Ibn Saud and the British and may have had some influence in the Arab Revolt the following year.
- The International Trade Union Educational League was established following the dissolution of the Syndicalist League of North America. Led by labor leader William Z. Foster, the organization was only active until 1917 when in-fighting and corruption charges dissolved the organization.
- The ship Endurance reached a latitude of 76°27′S, where explorer Ernest Shackleton named the distant land Caird Coast, after his principal backer. The ship then took shelter in the lee of a grounded iceberg to wait out bad weather.
- Born:
  - Sammy Angott, American boxer, 1940 world lightweight champion; as Salvatore Engotti, in Pittsburgh, United States (d. 1980)
  - Mayo Smith, American baseball player and manager, outfielder for the Philadelphia Athletics in 1945, manager for the Philadelphia Phillies, Cincinnati Reds, and Detroit Tigers from 1955 to 1970, 1968 World Series champion; as Edward Mayo Smith, in New London, Missouri, United States (d. 1977)

== January 18, 1915 (Monday) ==
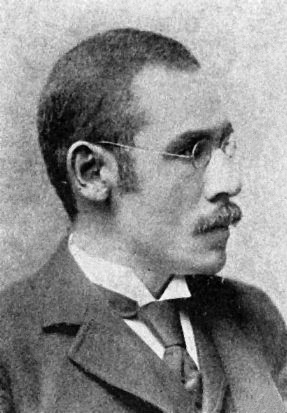
Foreign Minister Katō Takaaki

- Prime Minister of Japan Ōkuma Shigenobu and Foreign Minister Katō Takaaki drafted the initial list Twenty-One Demands which called upon Japan aggressively expanding its control of key ports, railways, mines and other resources and settlements in Manchuria, Inner Mongolia and other Chinese provinces.
- Battle of Ardahan — Russian defenders successful repelled an attacking Ottoman force after 17 days of siege on Ardahan, a border city between the Ottoman Empire and the Russian Empire.
- Battle of Jassin — German colonial forces attacked a city occupied by the British Indian Army on the border between British East Africa and German East Africa.
- British submarine HMS E10 was lost in the North Sea.
- The British Army established the 190th Brigade.
- Greek naval cruiser Antinavarhos Kountoriotis was launched by Cammell Laird at Birkenhead, but the Royal Navy purchased it and renamed it Birkenhead where it would serve in the Battle of Jutland the following year.
- The ship Endurance set course to the south towards Vahsel Bay after the weather broke. The ship only gained 14 nautical miles (26 km; 16 mi) before it was stopped altogether by the ice. The ship was at 76°34′S 31°30′W where it would remain trapped in ice for months.
- The Italian cargo steamship Varese, sailing from Sfax to Venice, struck a mine off Pola and sank; only one crew member survived.
- Born:
  - Santiago Carrillo, Spanish politician, General Secretary of the Communist Party of Spain from 1960 to 1982; as Santiago José Carrillo Solares, in Gijón, Asturias, Spain (d. 2012)
  - Kaúlza de Arriaga, Portuguese military officer, commander of Portuguese forces during the Mozambican War of Independence; in Lisbon, Portugal (d. 2004)
  - Syl Apps, Canadian hockey player and politician, played center for the Toronto Maple Leafs from 1936 to 1948, Member of the Legislative Assembly of Ontario from 1963 to 1975; as Charles Joseph Sylvanus Apps, in Paris, Ontario, Canada (d. 1998)
  - Vassilis Tsitsanis, Greek musician, leading promoter of bouzouki music; in Trikala, Kingdom of Greece (present-day Greece) (d. 1984)
- Died: Anatoly Stessel, 66, Russian army officer, head officer of the Russian forces during the Japanese assault on Shuishiying during the Russo-Japanese War (b. 1848)

== January 19, 1915 (Tuesday) ==
- Battle of Jassin — British forces surrendered at Jassin after two days of fighting. The battle cost 86 lives and 200 wounded but did little to improve defenses between the colonial British East Africa and German East Africa.
- Battle of Hartmannswillerkopf — The first of a series of battles began between the France and the Germany over Hartmannswillerkopf peak in the Vosges mountains that border between France and Germany in the Alsace region. German forces attempted to capture the summit but failed to dislodge a French force already dug in there.
- German Zeppelins bombed the coastal towns of Great Yarmouth and King's Lynn in England for the first time, killing more than 20 people.
- General elections were held in Malta with six out of the eight seats contested.
- The Yeomanry Mounted Brigade was established in Egypt and would serve in the Gallipoli campaign months later.
- The Order of the Lily and the Eagle was established in Cairo.
- Georges Claude patented the neon discharge tube for use in advertising.
- Born: Adrian Lombard, British aeronautical engineer, developer of the Rolls-Royce Conway turbo jet engine; in Coventry, England (d. 1967)
- Died: Anna Leonowens, 83, English academic and travel writer, tutor for the children of Mongkut, King of Siam, popularized in the musical The King and I (b. 1831)

== January 20, 1915 (Wednesday) ==
- German light cruiser SMS Wiesbaden was launched at the AG Vulcan shipyard in Stettin (then part of Germany). The Imperial German Navy ship would participate in the Battle of Jutland the following year.
- British cruiser HMS Conquest was launched at Chatham Dockyard in Chatham, Kent, England.
- South Australian Railways opened the Willunga railway line between Willunga, South Australia to Adelaide, Australia, with stations Marino Rocks, Hallett Cove, Patpa, Happy Valley, Reynella, Pimpala, Coorara, Morphett Vale, Yetto, Hackham, Korro, Noarlunga, Moana, Tuni, McLaren Vale, Pikkara, Taringa, and Willunga serving the line.
- Born:
  - Ghulam Ishaq Khan, Pakistani state leader, 7th President of Pakistan; in Ismailkhel, British India (present-day Pakistan) (d. 2006)
  - Albert Ouzoulias, French partisan fighter, one of the leaders of the French Resistance during World War II, recipient of the Legion of Honour; in Contrevoz, France (d. 1995)
- Died: Arthur Guinness, 74, Irish businessman and philanthropist, member and co-owner of the Guinness brewery, established St Stephen's Green park in Dublin (b. 1840)

== January 21, 1915 (Thursday) ==
- Battle of Hartmannswillerkopf — German forces beat back French forces attempting to relieve fellow troops defending Hartmannswillerkopf peak, with each side losing over 1,000 men.
- German submarine U-22 mistook fellow Imperial German Navy sub U-7 for an enemy vessel in the North Sea off the coast of the Netherlands and torpedoed it, killing all but one of her 25 crew.
- Kiwanis was founded in Detroit, as The Supreme Lodge Benevolent Order Brothers. It would become the organization's original club and within 15 years would grow to more than 100,000 members.
- A boiler explosion aboard the U.S. Navy armored cruiser USS San Diego (CA-6) killed eight firemen and a water tender. Two other crewmembers, Robert Webster Cary and Telesforo Trinidad, would receive the Medal of Honor for their heroism during the incident.

== January 22, 1915 (Friday) ==
- A train from Guadalajara, Mexico derailed and plunged into a canyon, killing over 600 passengers.
- Battle of Hartmannswillerkopf — French soldiers on Hartmannswillerkopf summit surrendered after running out of ammunition and supplies. However, both France and Germany consolidated forces as France intended to retake the peak, leading to more battles for the summit later in 1915.
- Siege of Mora – The Allies in German Cameroon attempted to force the German defenders on Mora mountain into surrendering by cutting off food and water sources at the start of the dry season.
- British colonial physician Gerard H. L. Fitzwilliams was elected for a third time to the Hong Kong sanitary board, along with British expatriate and solicitor P. W. Goldring.
- Died:
  - Anna Bartlett Warner, 87, hymn songwriter, author of "Jesus Loves Me" (b. 1827)
  - James M. Spangler, 66, American inventor, inventor of the first portable electric vacuum cleaner (b. 1848)

== January 23, 1915 (Saturday) ==
- An Austro-Hungarian force of 175,000 men launched an offensive against the Russians in the Carpathian Mountains.
- Chilembwe uprising — Baptist minister John Chilembwe organised an ultimately unsuccessful uprising against British colonial rule in Nyasaland, Africa (now Malawi). Chilembwe preached African independence through a form of Millenarianism through the Providence Industrial Mission that attracted many followers, allowing enough to be willing to take arms. An armed group met at the mission that night where Chilembwo warned "...we will all die by the heavy storm of the whiteman's army. The whitemen will then think, after we are dead, that the treatment they are treating [sic] our people is bad, and they might change to the better for our people."
- The final spike was driven on the transcontinental Canadian Northern Railway at Basque, British Columbia.
- The 68th Infantry Division of the British Army was established.
- The II and IV Cavalry Corps of the Imperial German Army were disbanded.
- University student newspaper Florida Flambeau published its first issue at the Florida State College for Women (now Florida State University).
- The Custom House Tower officially opened in Boston, with Assistant Secretary of the Treasury Andrew James Peters, Collector Edmund Billings, Governor David I. Walsh, Mayor James Michael Curley, Cardinal William Henry O'Connell, Bishop William Lawrence, and the building's architect, Robert Swain Peabody all attending the inauguration.
- Idaho established new counties in its state: Benewah County with Coeur d'Alene as its county seat, and Boundary County with Bonners Ferry as its county seat.
- Born:
  - Herma Bauma, Austrian field athlete, gold medalist at the 1948 Summer Olympics; as Hermine Bauma, in Vienna, Austria-Hungary (present-day Austria) (d. 2003)
  - Jane Elizabeth Hodgson, American physician and activist, advocate for women's reproductive rights; in Crookston, Minnesota, United States (d. 2006)
  - W. Arthur Lewis, Saint Lucian-British economist, recipient of the Nobel Memorial Prize in Economic Sciences for his work on development economics; as William Arthur Lewis, in Castries, Saint Lucia (d. 1991)
  - Potter Stewart, American judge, Associate Justice of the Supreme Court of the United States from 1958 to 1981; in Jackson, Michigan, United States (d. 1985)
- Died: Anne Whitney, 93, American sculptor and poet, known for public sculptures of historical figures such as Samuel Adams (1876) located in the National Statuary Hall Collection of the United States Capitol in Washington D.C., and Leif Erikson (1887) in Boston and a second edition the same year in Milwaukee; died from cancer (b. 1821)

== January 24, 1915 (Sunday) ==
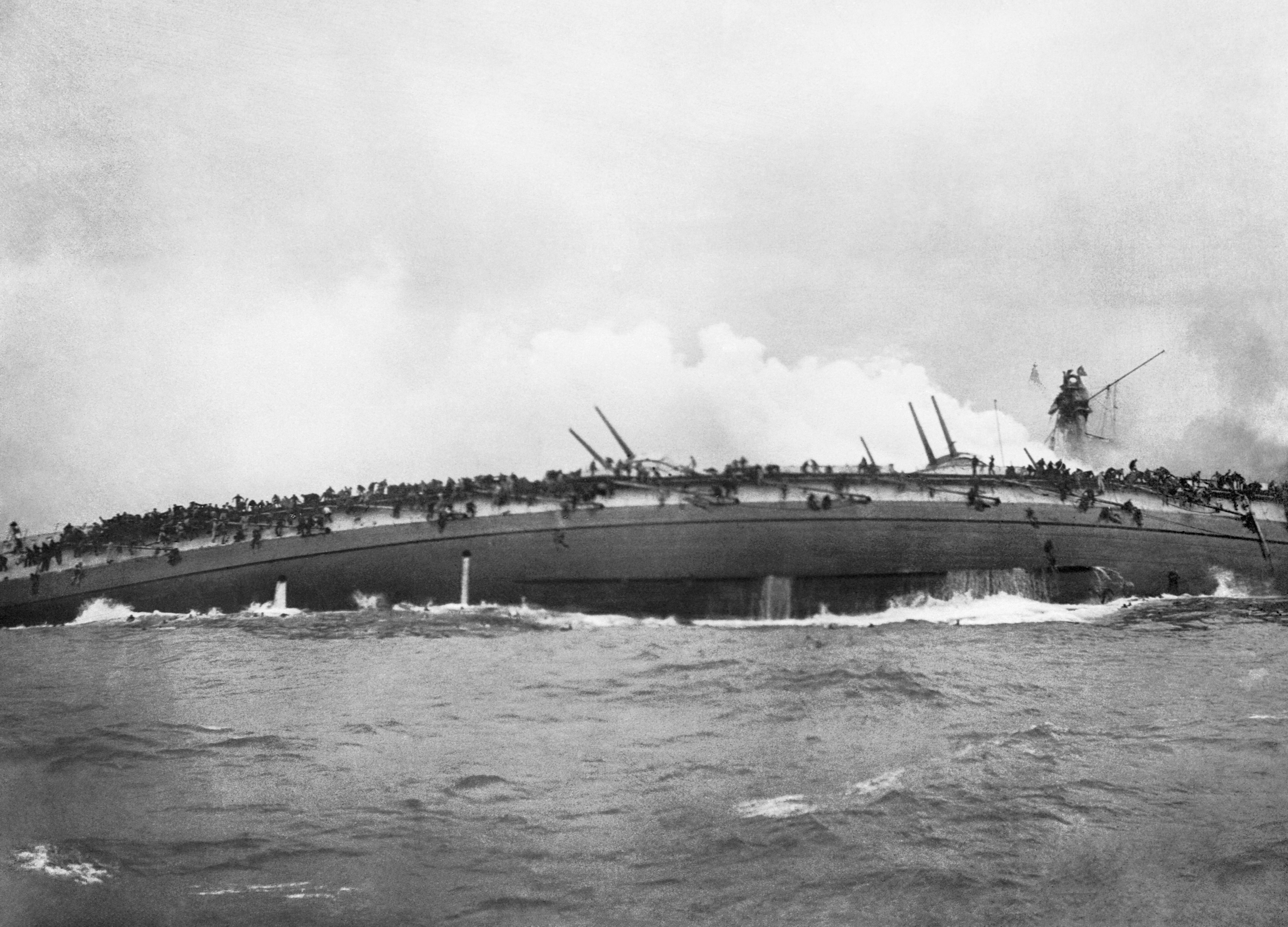
German warship SMS Blücher sinking

- Battle of Dogger Bank — The Royal Navy Grand Fleet defeated the Imperial German Navy High Seas Fleet in the North Sea, sinking the German armoured cruiser SMS Blücher with a loss of 792 sailors and disabling the German battleship SMS Seydlitz (killing 159 of its crew).
- Battle of Dogger Bank — The Germans first used their airship Zeppelins in a naval battle, when one attempted to engage one of the British light cruisers. After being pushed back by gunfire, it tried to track the action and pass on information to commanding German admiral, Franz von Hipper, although the contributions to battle were minimal at best.
- Chilembwe uprising — Rebel leader John Chilembwe split up his rebel group, sending one group to the towns of Blantyre and Limbe in hopes of liberating weapons from stores owned by the African Lakes Company. The other group went to a plantation owned by A. L. Bruce Estates, the largest agricultural estate owner in the African colony of Nyasaland, in search of more weapons. The raid on the plantation resulted in the deaths of plantation manager William Jervis Livingstone and two associates along with an African servant. Chilembwe also sent a letter to the Governor of German East Africa requesting military and diplomatic support from Germany, but the letter was intercepted and never received.
- Ross Sea party — Aeneas Mackintosh, leader of the British Ross Sea party expedition, ordered sledge parties to set up supply depots at Minna Bluff and further south along the Great Ice Barrier in the Antarctic. Despite safety concerns raised by Ernest Joyce, a veteran of previous Antarctic exploration who was in charge of organizing the sledge parties, Mackintosh was weeks behind schedule and insisted the depots be set up for the main party of the Imperial Trans-Antarctic Expedition.
- Born: Robert Motherwell, American painter, member of the abstract expressionist New York School; in Aberdeen, Washington, United States (d. 1991)

== January 25, 1915 (Monday) ==
- Chilembwe uprising — After capturing only a half a dozen rifles and ammunition from raiding, rebels loyal to John Chilembwe returned to his mission where they were met by soldiers with the King's African Rifles. The resulting battle resulted in the deaths of 20 rebels and two soldiers.
- Raid on the Suez Canal — Ottoman troops were observed advancing on Qantara on the Sinai.
- The first United States coast-to-coast long-distance telephone call, facilitated by a newly invented vacuum tube amplifier, was ceremonially inaugurated by Alexander Graham Bell in New York City and his former assistant Thomas A. Watson, in San Francisco.
- The Imperial German Navy lost its first airship when a Zeppelin was forced down over the Baltic Sea by icing and engine failure while attempting to return to base after bombing Libau, Russia. Two Imperial Russian Navy minesweepers captured the seven-man crew and set the airship ablaze, destroying her.
- Ross Sea party — Aeneas Mackintosh, leader of the British Ross Sea party expedition, left with the other sledge parties to set up supply depots for the Imperial Trans-Antarctic Expedition, leaving chief officer Joseph Stenhouse in command of the polar ship Aurora.
- The U.S. Supreme Court released decisions on the following federal cases:
  - A pardon is only legitimate if entered into court proceedings and the person receiving it accepts the pardon, otherwise it cannot be forced upon a person. The case came about after George Burdick, editor of the New-York Tribune, refused a pardon from U.S. President Woodrow Wilson after being convicted of refusing to reveal the source of information on a story covering the Treasury Department.
  - It is outside state police power to prohibit employment contracts that bar workers from joining a union, upholding a Kansas company's right to issue such contracts.
- Emory College was rechartered as Emory University, and planned to move its main campus from Oxford, Georgia, to Atlanta.
- Born: Ewan MacColl, English folk singer and songwriter, author of "The First Time Ever I Saw Your Face"; as James Henry Miller, in Broughton, Salford, England (d. 1989)
- Died: Lucy Higgs Nichols, 76, American nurse, former slave and field medical nurse for the 23rd Indiana Infantry Regiment during the American Civil War (b. 1838)

== January 26, 1915 (Tuesday) ==
- Russian forces counter-attacked the invading Austro-Hungarian Third Army in the Carpathian Mountains and began pushing them back towards Przemyśl in Galacia (now western Poland).
- Raid on the Suez Canal — Ottoman forces began assaulting El Qantara, Egypt, which lay right on the Suez Canal, while another force of 6,000 Ottoman troops was spotted further east.
- Chilembwe uprising — A group of rebels raided a Catholic mission at Nguludi, Nyasaland, Africa (now Malawi) while rebel leader John Chilembwe and many of his followers slipped past army blockades disguised as civilians. The rebels' church was then destroyed with dynamite, effectively ending the rebellion.
- The 1st Canadian Division was formally mobilized for combat in France under command of British officer Lieutenant General Edwin Alderson.
- The Rocky Mountain National Park was established by an act of the United States Congress.
- American schooner SS Elizabeth Palmer sank in the Atlantic Ocean off Fenwick Island, Delaware, after colliding with the Washingtonian. The Washingtonian rescued the Palmer crew before foundering herself. All 52 sailors from both vessels were then rescued by SS Hamilton.
- Teton County, Idaho was incorporated, with its county seat in Driggs.
- Born: Rani Gaidinliu, Indian revolutionary leader, lead an armed revolt among the Zeliangrong Naga people against British India, recipient of the Padma Bhushan; as Gaidinliu Pamei, in Nungkao Village, Manipur, British India (present-day Tamenglong District, Manipur, India) (d. 1993)

== January 27, 1915 (Wednesday) ==
- Raid on the Suez Canal — British forces lost the main coastal road between Qantara at the Suez Canal and El Arish that bordered Palestine.
- American barque ship William P. Frye was captured in the Atlantic Ocean by German auxiliary cruiser Prinz Eitel Friedrich and scuttled the next day. Her crew were taken on board and released when she arrived at Newport News, Virginia, on 11 March.
- The Imperial German Army established the 7th Landwehr Division.
- Military casualties began arriving at the Hôpital Temporaire d'Arc-en-Barrois, established earlier in the month in Haute-Marne, France.
- The town of Blackey, Kentucky, was established.
- Born:
  - Jack Brymer, English musician, played clarinet for the Royal Philharmonic Orchestra; as John Alexander Brymer, in South Shields, England (d. 2003)
  - Gene Sherman, American journalist, known for his investigative stories with the Los Angeles Times, recipient of the 1960 Pulitzer Prize for Public Service; as Eugene Franklin Sherman, in Oak Park, Illinois, United States (d. 1969)

== January 28, 1915 (Thursday) ==
- The Coast Guard Act passed by United States Congress merged the United States Life-Saving Service and the United States Revenue Cutter Service into the United States Coast Guard.
- The last edition of The Frostburg Spirit weekly newspaper was published in Frostburg, Maryland.

== January 29, 1915 (Friday) ==
- German saboteur Werner Horn left from Grand Central Station in New York City with a suitcase of dynamite for Maine to damage the Saint Croix–Vanceboro Railway Bridge, which was a major railway international border crossing over the St. Croix River between Saint Croix, New Brunswick, Canada, to Vanceboro, Maine, United States.
- British newspaper publisher Arthur Pearson, who was legally blind, established The Blinded Soldiers and Sailors Care Committee for British soldiers blinded by trauma or in gas attacks during World War I. The committee eventually formed the charity organization Blind Veterans UK.
- Brazilian composer Heitor Villa-Lobos gave the first in a series of chamber concerts, allowing him to later introduce Cello Concerto No. 1 and String Quartet No. 2 to the public.
- Born:
  - John Serry Sr., American musician and composer, best known for his accordion performance on CBS Radio and CBS Television; as John Serrapica, in New York City, United States (d. 2003)
  - Bill Peet, American children's illustrator and story writer, best known for his work with Disney on most of its classic movies from 1940s to 1950s including Snow White and the Seven Dwarfs, Pinocchio, and Cinderella; as William Bartlett Peed, in Grandview, Indiana, United States (d. 2002)
  - Megan Boyd, British sports angler, recipient of the British Empire Medal; as Rosina Megan Boyd, in Surrey, England (d. 2001)

== January 30, 1915 (Saturday) ==
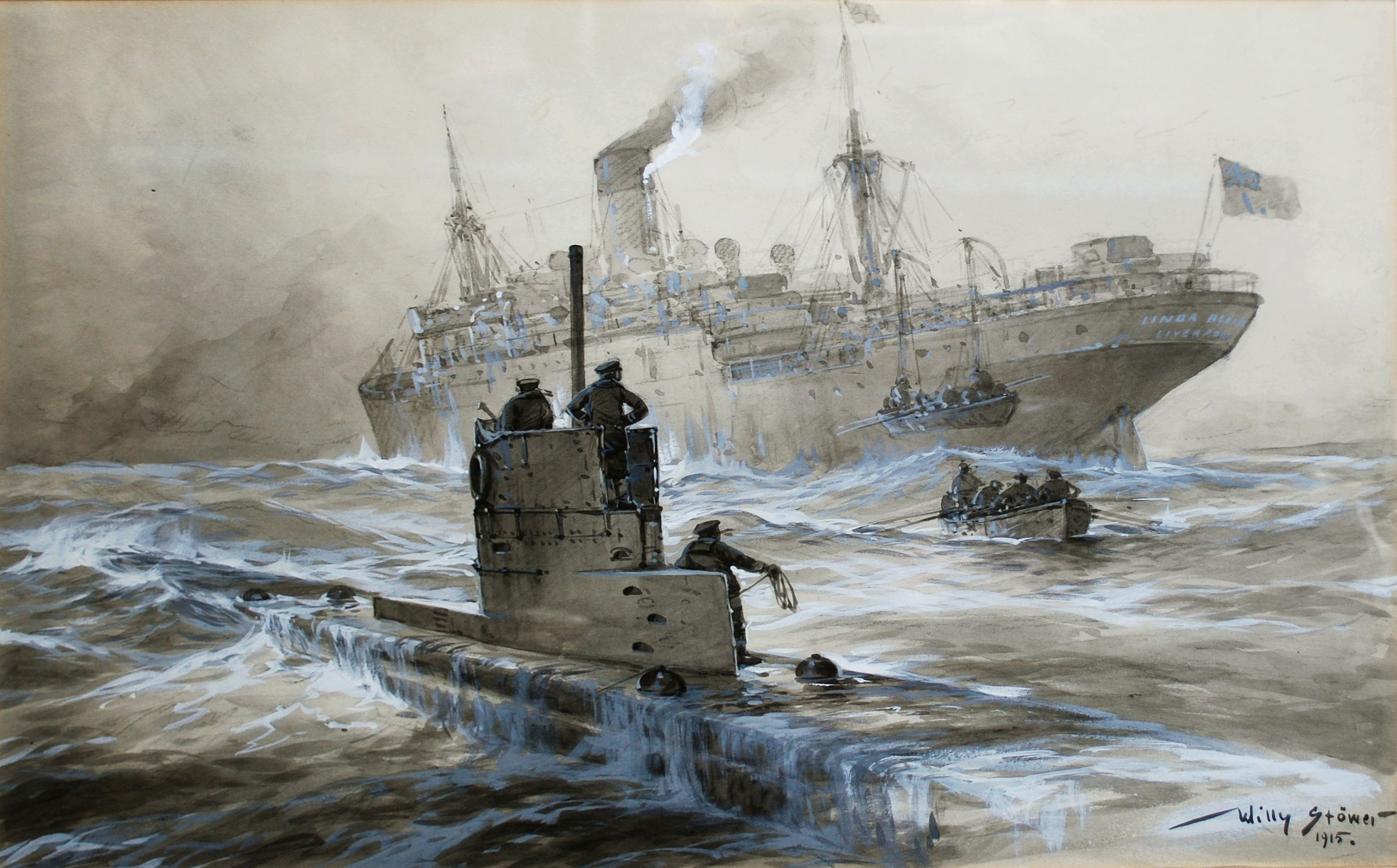
The sinking of Linda Blanche. Painting by Willy Stöwer.

- German submarine SM U-21 sunk British cargo ships Linda Blanche and Kilcuan, and scuttled the British collier Ben Cruachan, all in a single day within the Irish Sea.
- British cargo ship SS Tokomaru was torpedoed and sunk in the English Channel by German submarine SM U-20. All 58 crew were rescued by the French trawler Semper and six French Navy torpedo boats.
- U.S. Representative Richard Bartholdt of Missouri was elected president of the American Independence Union during a day-long conference in Washington D.C. The organization was to lobby the U.S. Government to remain neutral through World War I.
- The prototype for the Gotha G.I bomber was first flown at Gotha, Germany.
- Born:
  - John Profumo, British politician, 54th Secretary of State for War; in London, England (d. 2006)
  - Joachim Peiper, German Waffen-SS during World War II, personal adjutant to Heinrich Himmler; in Berlin, German Empire (present-day Germany) (d. 1976, assassinated)
  - Stelios Joannou, Cypriot industrialist, co-founder of the construction firm Joannou & Paraskevaides; in Larnaca, Cyprus (d. 1999)

== January 31, 1915 (Sunday) ==
- Raid on the Suez Canal — British forces prepared for the first major offensive by an estimated 13,500 Ottoman troops to capture the canal.
- Battle of Bolimów — Forces with the German Ninth Army attacked the Russian Second Army near the Polish village of Bolimów which contained a key railway connecting Łódź and Warsaw. It was the first battle where Germany used poison gas on an enemy. But despite firing 18,000 artillery shells containing liquid xylyl bromide — a type of tear gas — on Russian lines, freezing temperatures prevented it from being effective. As a result, German commanders had to call off the attack, allowing the Russians to counterattack with 11 divisions. German artillery repelled the attack, inflicting 40,000 casualties. Germany also sustained 20,000 casualties.
- The 8th Landwehr Division of the Imperial German Army was established.
- The London Underground extended the Bakerloo line with new tube stations at Kilburn Park and Warwick Avenue.
- The Islamic magazine Al-Munir published its last issue in Padang, Dutch East Indies.
- Born:
  - Izzy Jannazzo, American boxer, World Welterweight champion in 1940; as Isadoro Anthony Jannazzo, in Ensley, Alabama, United States (d. 1995)
  - Alan Lomax, American folklorist and musicologist, best known for his recording contributions to the Archive of Folk Culture at the Library of Congress; in Austin, Texas, United States (d. 2002)
  - Thomas Merton, French-American monk and author, best known for his autobiography The Seven Storey Mountain; in Prades, Pyrénées-Orientales, France (d. 1968)
  - Garry Moore, American television personality, known for 1960s variety The Garry Moore Show; as Thomas Garrison Morfit, in Baltimore, United States (d. 1993)
  - Ian Ramsey, British clergy and academic, Chair Professor of Philosophy of Religion at the University of Oxford, Bishop of Durham from 1966 to 1972; in Kearsley, England (d. 1972)
  - Diana Rowden, British air force officer, Special Operations Executive in France during World War II, recipient of the Croix de guerre (executed, 1944)
  - Joseph Sarnoski, American bomber pilot for United States Army Air Forces during World War II, member of the Old 666 bomber crew, bomber recipient of the Medal of Honor; in Simpson, Pennsylvania, United States (killed during the Solomon Islands campaign, 1943)
