= Coast to Vines Rail Trail =

Rail trail in South Australia

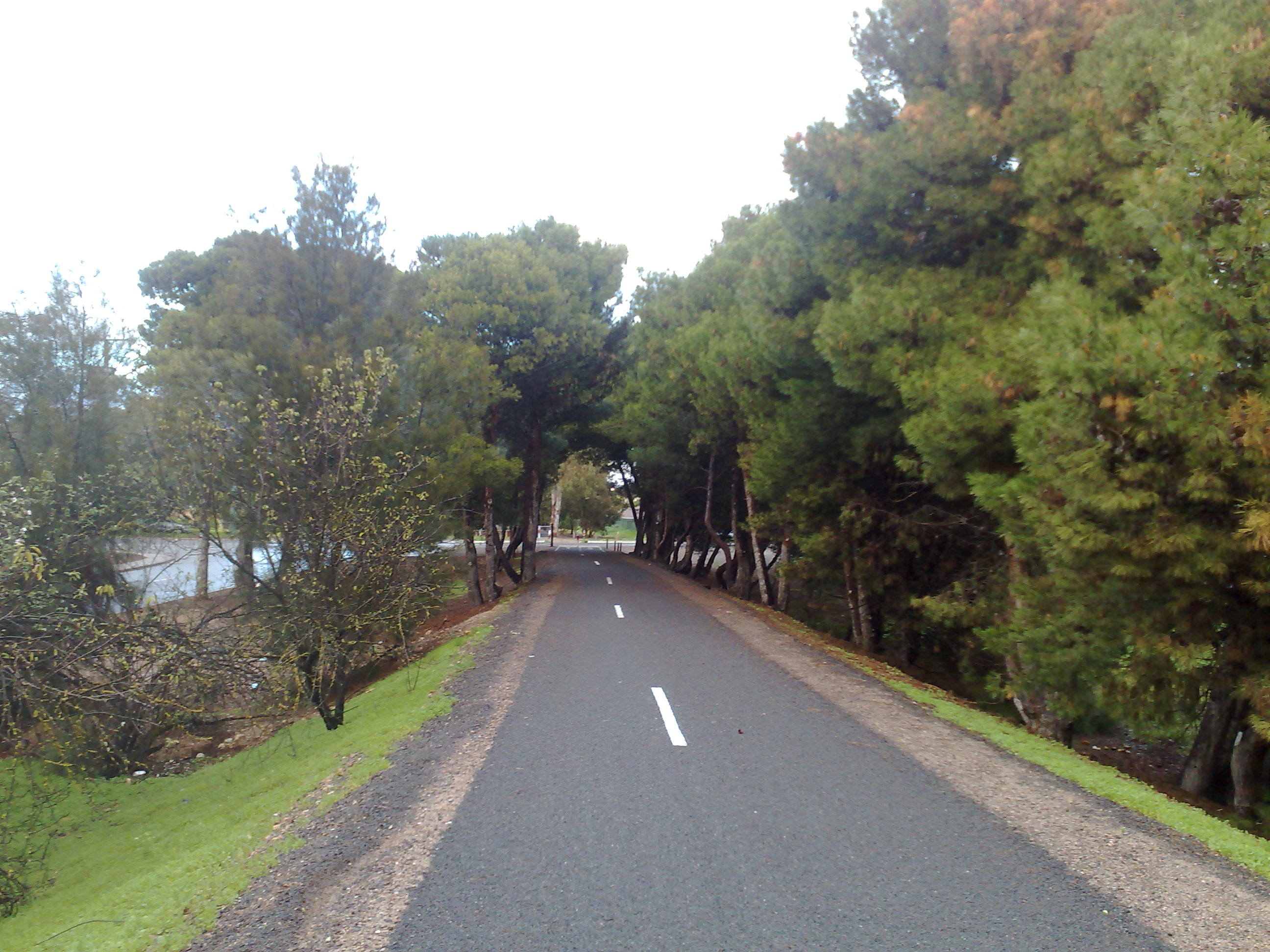
- Section of the Coast to Vines rail trail in Old Reynella, facing South
- Length: 34 km (21 mi)
- Location: southern suburbs of Adelaide, South Australia
- Trailheads: Marino Rocks railway station, Willunga railway station
- Use: Hiking, cycling
- Season: all
- Sights: Gulf St Vincent, McLaren Vale wine region, Onkaparinga River
- Hazards: some at-level road crossings
- Surface: sealed
- Right of way: Willunga railway line
- Website: http://www.railtrails.org.au/trail-descriptions/south-australia?view=trail&id=199

The Coast to Vines rail trail is a rail trail in the Australian state of South Australia following the course of the disused Willunga railway line in the southern suburbs of Adelaide. It is open to pedestrians and cyclists, and runs for 34 km from Marino to Willunga.

The northern end of the trail continues from the Marino Rocks Greenway near the Marino Rocks railway station, on The Cove Road.

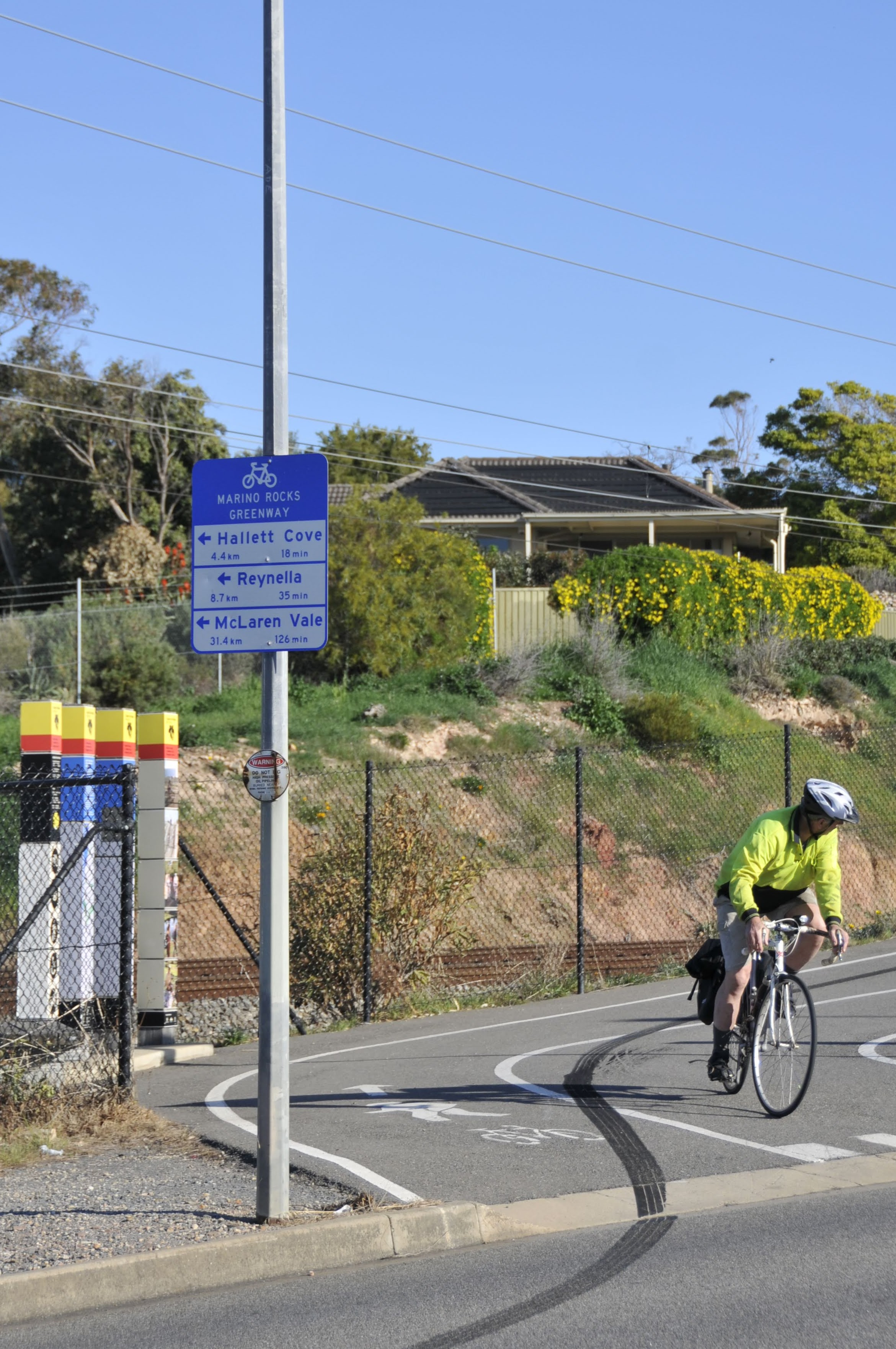
The start of the Coast to Vines Rail Trail at Marino Rocks, Adelaide.

From Marino Rocks it follows the Seaford railway line until Hallett Cove station where it shares the footbridge over the line. A short distance away are Hallett Cove shops, where it crosses Lonsdale Highway and proceeds through a picturesque area of Trott Park. The right turn into Old South Road at the intersection of Panalatinga Road is the start of the section of the trail along the old railway line, with trees lining both sides to Hackham. The path is completely off-road, but it does cross roads, especially in this area of the trail. The path and the roads are clearly signposted. The path crosses Christies Creek and a number of other small creeks along this section. Continuing on will take the rider to the Onkaparinga River and from there to McLaren Vale and Willunga.

The former railway line stations were Patpa, Happy Valley, Reynella, Coorara, Morphett Vale, Yetto, Hackham, Korro, Noarlunga, Moana, Tuni, McLaren Vale, Pikkara, Taringa and Willunga.

The trail was completed in 2007, with a small section running along the main street of McLaren Vale. It intersects with the Patrick Jonker Veloway at both Panalatinga Road turnoff and Southern end of the Southern Expressway.
