= 1915 in rail transport =

This article lists events related to rail transport that occurred in 1915.

== Events ==
=== January events ===
- January 1 – The Ilford rail crash in England kills ten.
- January 15 – The final spike is driven on the transcontinental Canadian Northern Railway at Basque, British Columbia.

=== March events ===
- March 7 – San Diego's Union Station officially opens, ushering in a new era of rail transport for the city.
- March 15 – The Chicago, Indianapolis and Louisville Railway, later known as the Monon Railroad, acquires control of the Chicago and Wabash Valley Railroad.

=== April events ===
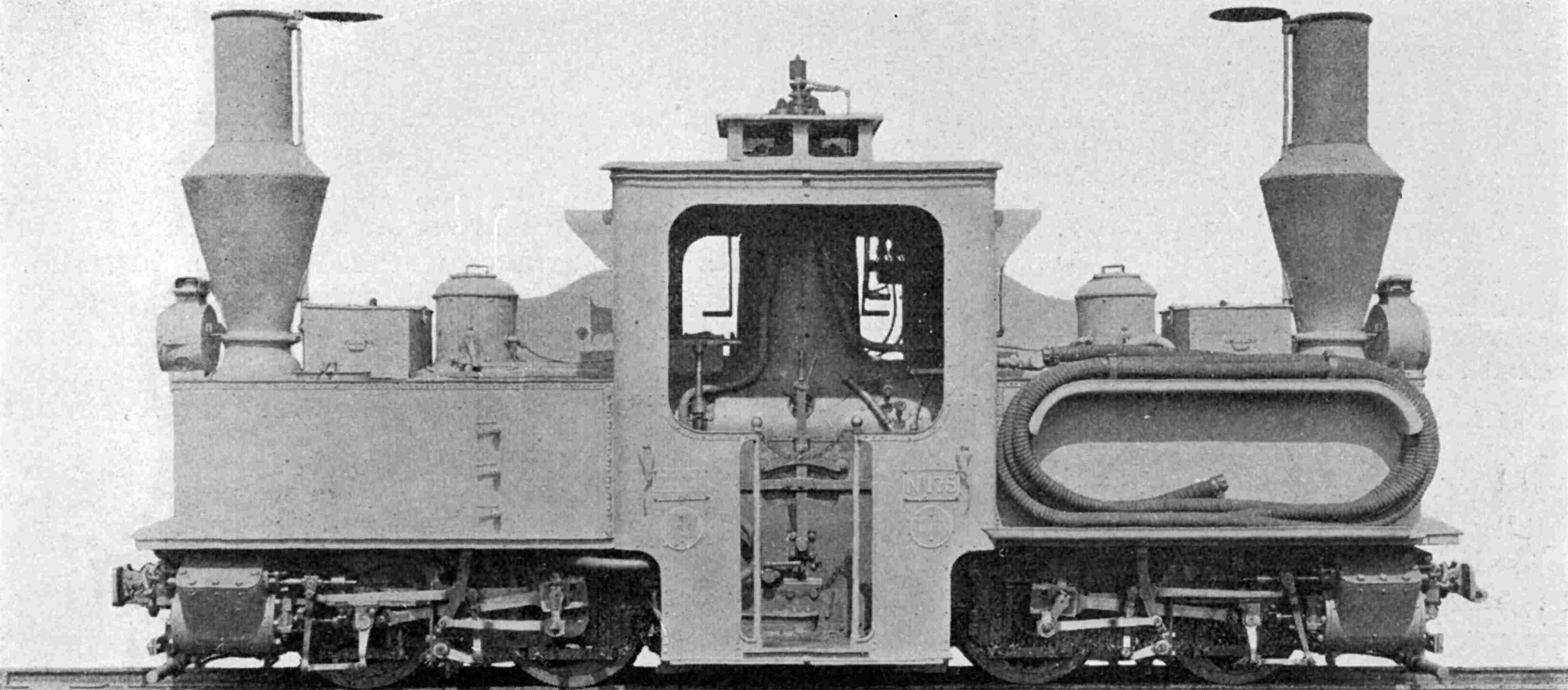
Baldwin Péchot-Bourdon locomotive

- Baldwin Locomotive Works delivers the first of 280 Péchot-Bourdon locomotives for the French trench railways on the Western Front (World War I).
- April 15 – Musashino Railway Line, Ikebukuro of Tokyo to Hannō route, officially completed in Japan (predecessor of Seibu Ikebukuro Line).
- April 20 – The Chicago, Rock Island and Pacific Railway enters receivership with J. M. Dickinson and H. U. Mudge appointed as receivers.

=== May events ===
- May 8 – Schwyzer Strassenbahnen (SStB) opens connecting Ibach, Schwyz and Brunnen Schifflände in Switzerland.
- May 22 – In the Quintinshill rail crash, four trains including a troop train collide, the accident and ensuing fire causing 226 fatalities and injuring 246 people at Quintinshill, Gretna Green, Scotland; the accident is blamed on negligence by the signalmen during a shift change at a busy junction.

=== June events ===
- June 22 – BMT Sea Beach Line opens as a New York City Subway line and AB Standard cars enter service.

=== August events ===
- August 1 – Estación Retiro in Buenos Aires, Argentina, opens.
- August 14 – The Weedon rail crash in England kills ten.
- August 28 – The first train operates over the regauged Ravenglass and Eskdale Railway in England using 15 in (381 mm) gauge equipment.

=== September events ===
- September 11 – The Pennsylvania Railroad begins electrified commuter rail service between Paoli and Philadelphia, using overhead AC trolley wires for power.
- September 14 – The funeral train for William Cornelius Van Horne departs Windsor Station (Montreal) at 11:00 AM bound for Joliet, Illinois; the train is pulled by CP 4-6-2 no. 2213.

=== October events ===
- October 1 – Atchison, Topeka and Santa Fe Railway introduces the Navajo passenger train in San Francisco-Los Angeles-Chicago service as a replacement for the Tourist Flyer.
- October 27 – Keihan Electric Railway, Tenmabashi of Osaka via Hirakata to Sanjo of Kyoto route, officially complete in Japan.
- c. October 30 – Railway to Beersheba opens.

=== November events ===
- November 6 – The Delaware, Lackawanna and Western Railroad's Tunkhannock Viaduct, with 10 arches totalling 2,375 ft (724 m) in length and 240 ft (73.15 m) from creekbed forming the world's largest reinforced concrete structure at this date, is officially opened.

=== December events ===
- December 16 – William Kissam Vanderbilt is found to be in violation of antitrust laws in the United States because the New York Central owns a controlling interest in the Nickel Plate Road, both of which Vanderbilt owns.
- December 17 – The St Bedes Junction rail crash and fire in England kills nineteen people.

=== Unknown date events ===
- First Russian locomotive class Ye 2-10-0s built in North America. By the end of World War II, more than three thousand will have been built to the same basic design.

== Births ==
=== September births ===
- September 11 – Carl Fallberg, cartoonist who created Fiddletown & Copperopolis (died 1996).

=== December births ===
- December 10 – William N. Deramus III, president of Chicago Great Western Railway 1949–1957, Missouri–Kansas–Texas Railroad 1957–1961, Kansas City Southern Railway 1961–1973, is born (died 1989).

== Deaths ==
=== May deaths ===
- May 20 – Charles Francis Adams Jr., president of the Union Pacific Railroad 1884–1890 (born 1835).

=== September deaths ===
- September 11 – William Cornelius Van Horne, oversaw the major construction of the Canadian Pacific Railway, youngest superintendent of Illinois Central Railroad (born 1843).
