= Pimpala railway station =

Former railway station in South Australia, Australia

General information
- Location: Australia
- Coordinates: 35.10447°S 138.52936°E
- Owner: South Australian Railways
- Operator: South Australian Railways
- Line: Willunga railway line
- Train operators: South Australian Railways

History
- Opened: 20 January 1915
- Closed: 1969

Services
Preceding station	South Australian Railways	Following station
Reynella towards Adelaide	Willunga railway line	Coorara towards Willunga
Location

Pimpala is a closed railway station in Adelaide, South Australia. It was a ground level stopping place during the passenger transport days of this line, and a 1965 reference mentioned that it was no longer used at that date.

The stop is now completely disused, the entire Willunga railway line having been dismantled in 1972, and now replaced by the Coast to Vines Rail Trail. The Pimpala station was on the north side of Pimpala Road where the trail crosses that road in Old Reynella.
