= Noarlunga railway station =

Former railway station in South Australia, Australia

General information
- Location: Australia
- Coordinates: 35.176°S 138.494°E
- Owner: South Australian Railways
- Operator: South Australian Railways
- Line: Willunga railway line
- Train operators: South Australian Railways

History
- Opened: 20 January 1915
- Closed: 1969

Services
Preceding station	South Australian Railways	Following station
Korro towards Adelaide	Willunga railway line	Moana towards Willunga
Route map
Location

Noarlunga is a closed railway station in Adelaide, South Australia. It was an unattended crossing station, with water available. The ticket agency was closed in 1946.

The stop is now completely disused, the entire Willunga railway line having been dismantled in 1972 and is now the route of the Coast to Vines Rail Trail.

== See also ==
- Noarlunga (disambiguation)
