= Pikkara railway station =

Former railway station in South Australia, Australia

Pikkara

General information
- Location: McMurtrie Road, McLaren Vale; South Australia; Australia
- Coordinates: 35.22566°S 138.55437°E
- Owner: South Australian Railways
- Operator: South Australian Railways
- Line: Willunga railway line
- Train operators: South Australian Railways

History
- Opened: 20 January 1915
- Closed: 1969

Services
Preceding station	South Australian Railways	Following station
McLaren Vale towards Adelaide	Willunga railway line	Taringa towards Willunga
Location

Pikkara is a closed railway station in Adelaide, South Australia. It was a ground level stopping place during the passenger transport days of this line, and a 1965 reference mentioned that it was no longer used at that date. It was located just north of McMurtrie Road on the southeastern outskirts of McLaren Vale.

The stop is now completely disused, the entire Willunga railway line having been dismantled in 1972 and later replaced with the Coast to Vines Rail Trail.
