= Hackham railway station =

Dismantled railway station in Hackham, Australia

Hackham
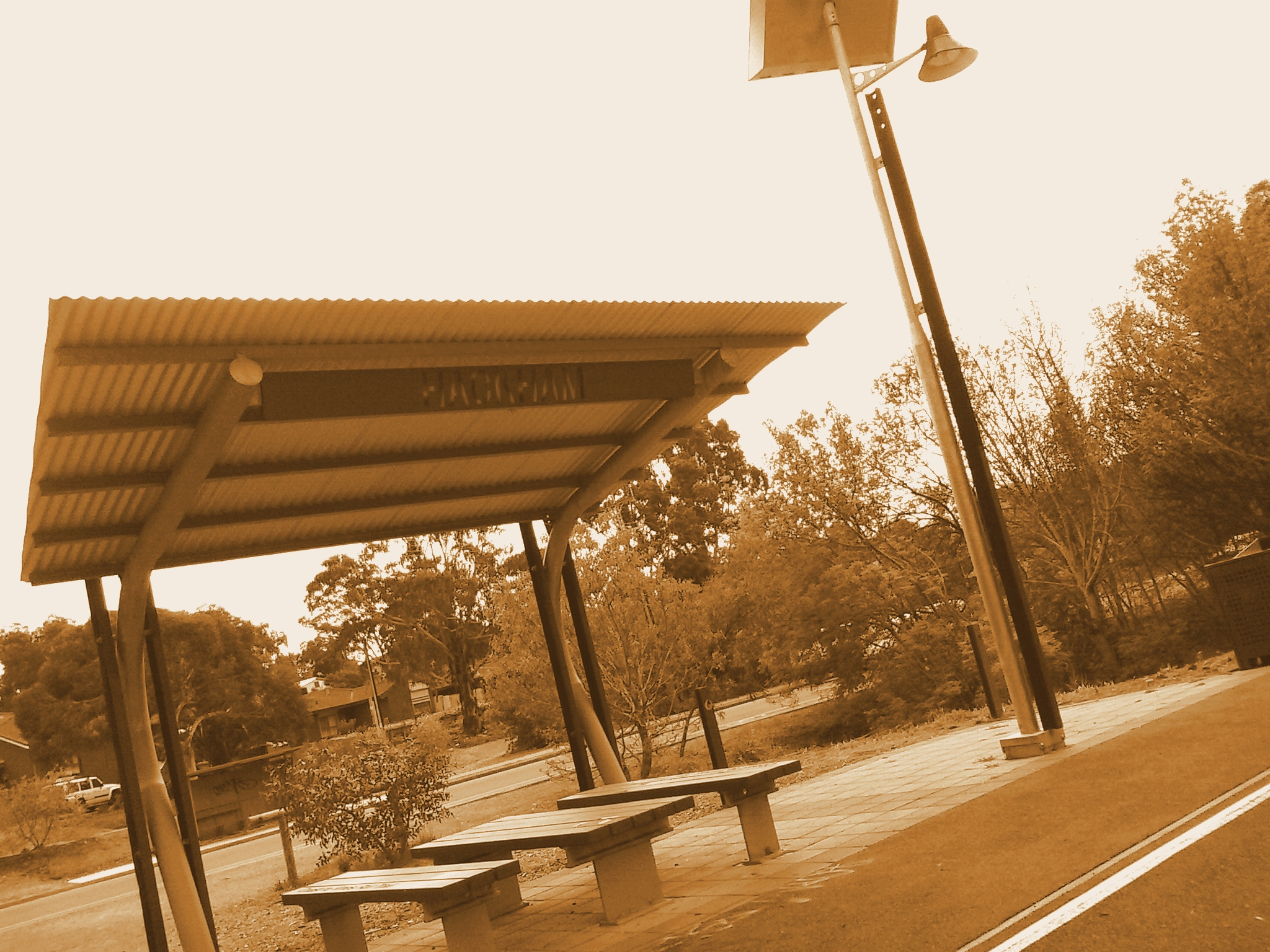
- Site Of Hackham railway station

General information
- Location: Australia
- Coordinates: 35.14339°S 138.52767°E
- Owner: South Australian Railways
- Operator: South Australian Railways
- Line: Willunga railway line
- Platforms: One raised platform
- Train operators: South Australian Railways

History
- Opened: 20 January 1915
- Closed: 1969

Services
Preceding station	South Australian Railways	Following station
Yetto towards Adelaide	Willunga railway line	Korro towards Willunga
Location

Hackham railway station was a railway station on the Willunga railway line serving Hackham, Australia. The station had a raised passenger platform during the passenger transport days of this line. The crossing was protected by flashing lights.

The entire line was dismantled in 1972 and the stop is now a picnic stop on the Coast to Vines Rail Trail.
