= Morphett Vale railway station =

Former railway station in South Australia, Australia

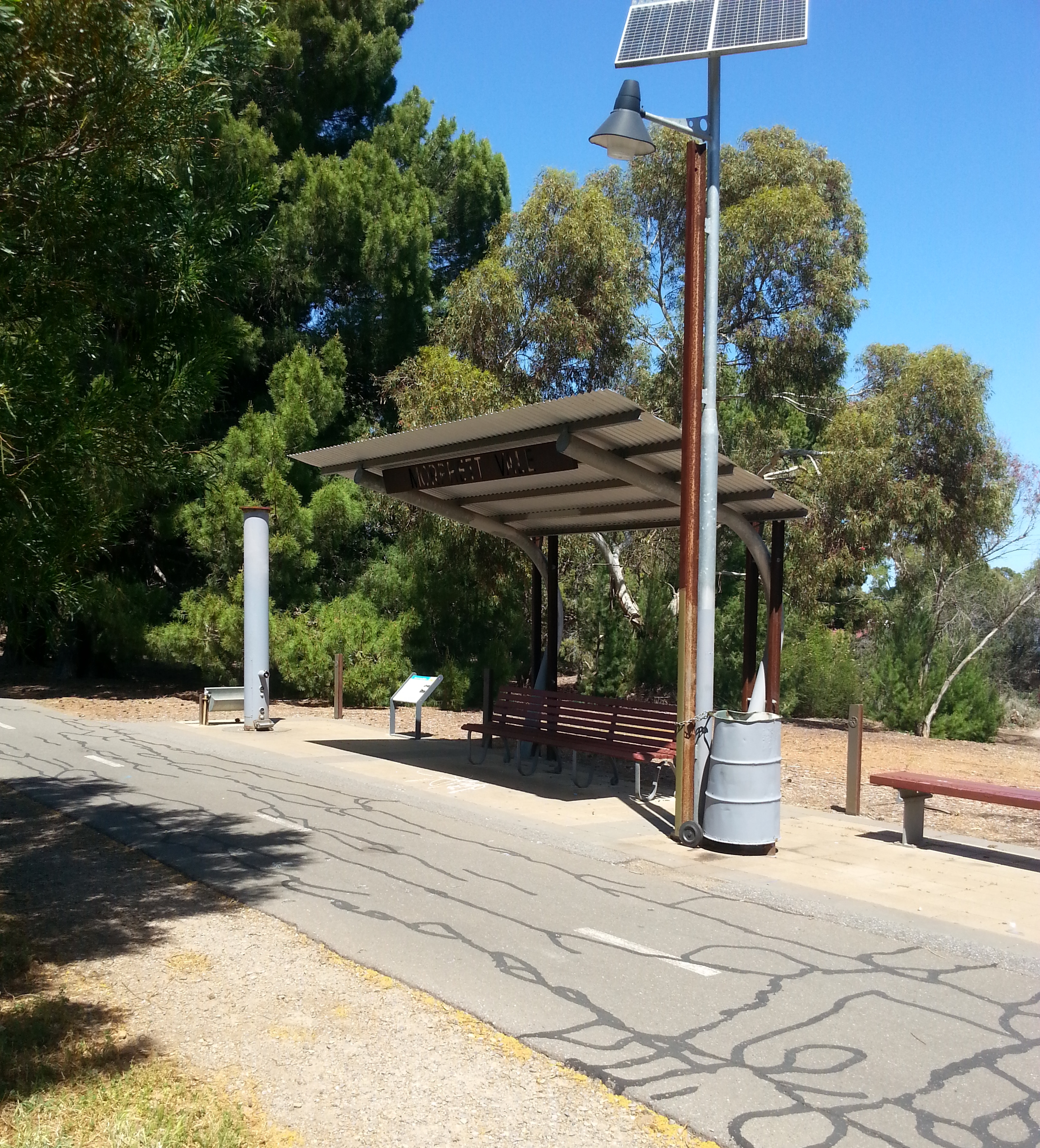
- Site of former Morphett Vale Railway Station, October 2015

General information
- Location: Australia
- Coordinates: 35.12432°S 138.52996°E
- Owner: South Australian Railways
- Operator: South Australian Railways
- Line: Willunga railway line
- Train operators: South Australian Railways

History
- Opened: 20 January 1915
- Closed: 1969

Services
Preceding station	South Australian Railways	Following station
Coorara towards Adelaide	Willunga railway line	Yetto towards Willunga
Location

Morphett Vale is a closed railway station in Adelaide, South Australia. A station master was appointed in 1915 but it was an unattended crossing station since 1957. Facilities were available for the handling of casks of wine, as this area was mainly covered in vineyards.

It is now disused, the entire Willunga railway line having been dismantled in 1972 and now replaced by the Coast to Vines Rail Trail.
