= Korro railway station =

Former railway station in South Australia, Australia

Korro
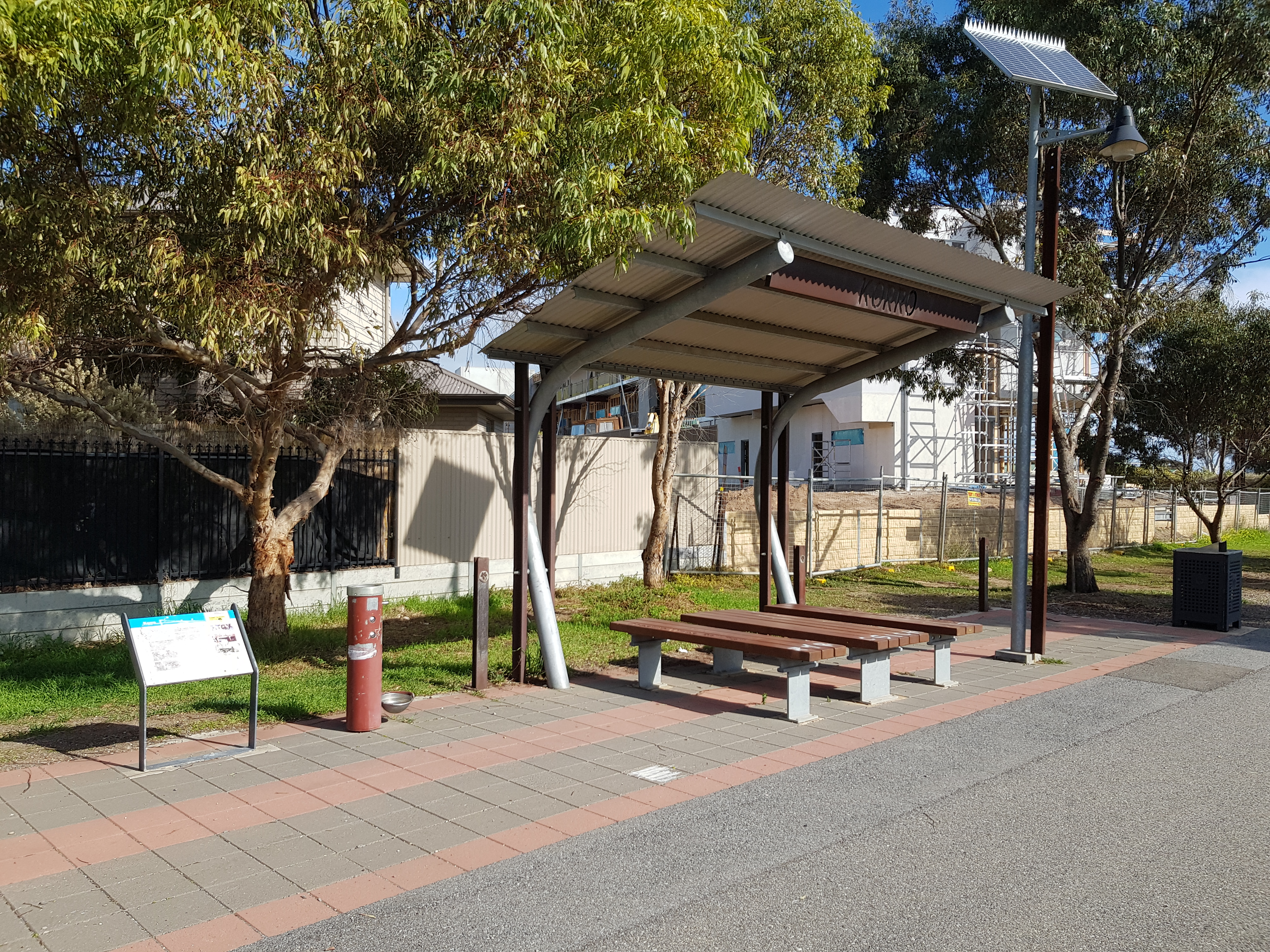
- Site of former Korro Railway Station, August 2018

General information
- Location: Australia
- Coordinates: 35.16198°S 138.51579°E
- Owner: South Australian Railways
- Operator: South Australian Railways
- Line: Willunga railway line
- Platforms: ground level
- Train operators: South Australian Railways

History
- Opened: 20 January 1915
- Closed: 1969

Services
Preceding station	South Australian Railways	Following station
Hackham towards Adelaide	Willunga railway line	Noarlunga towards Willunga
Location

Korro railway station was a ground level stopping place during the passenger transport days of the Willunga railway line.

Shortly after the stop, the railway crossed the Onkaparinga River. The old bridge, built in 1914, had 3 spans, each of 70 feet, and was of lattice-type girder construction. A second bridge, built in 1930, also has 3 spans of rivetted plate-girder construction founded on concrete abutment piers driven into the bedrock. Height 17 feet, 3 inches.

The stop is now unused, the entire Willunga railway line having been dismantled in 1972 and later replaced with the Coast to Vines Rail Trail. It was located near what is now the southern end of the Southern Expressway in Huntfield Heights.
