= McLaren Vale railway station =

Former railway station in South Australia, Australia

McLaren Vale

General information
- Location: Railway Terrace, McLaren Vale; South Australia; Australia
- Coordinates: 35.21709°S 138.54596°E
- Owner: South Australian Railways
- Operator: South Australian Railways
- Line: Willunga railway line
- Platforms: ground level
- Train operators: South Australian Railways

History
- Opened: 20 January 1915
- Closed: 1969

Services
Preceding station	South Australian Railways	Following station
Tuni towards Adelaide	Willunga railway line	Pikkara towards Willunga
Location

McLaren Vale is a closed railway station in Adelaide, South Australia. It was a ground level stopping place during the passenger transport days of this line and was an unattended crossing station after 1957. The station yard was noted for its impressive avenue of giant pine trees.

The stop is now disused, the entire Willunga railway line having been dismantled in 1972 and more recently replaced by the Coast to Vines Rail Trail.
