= Tuni railway station =

Tuni railway station may refer to:

- Tuni railway station, Adelaide, a closed station on the former Willunga railway line
- Tuni railway station, Andhra Pradesh serves the town of Tuni on the Howrah–Chennai main line
