= Yetto railway station =

Former railway station in South Australia, Australia

Coordinates: 35°07′40″S 138°31′49″E

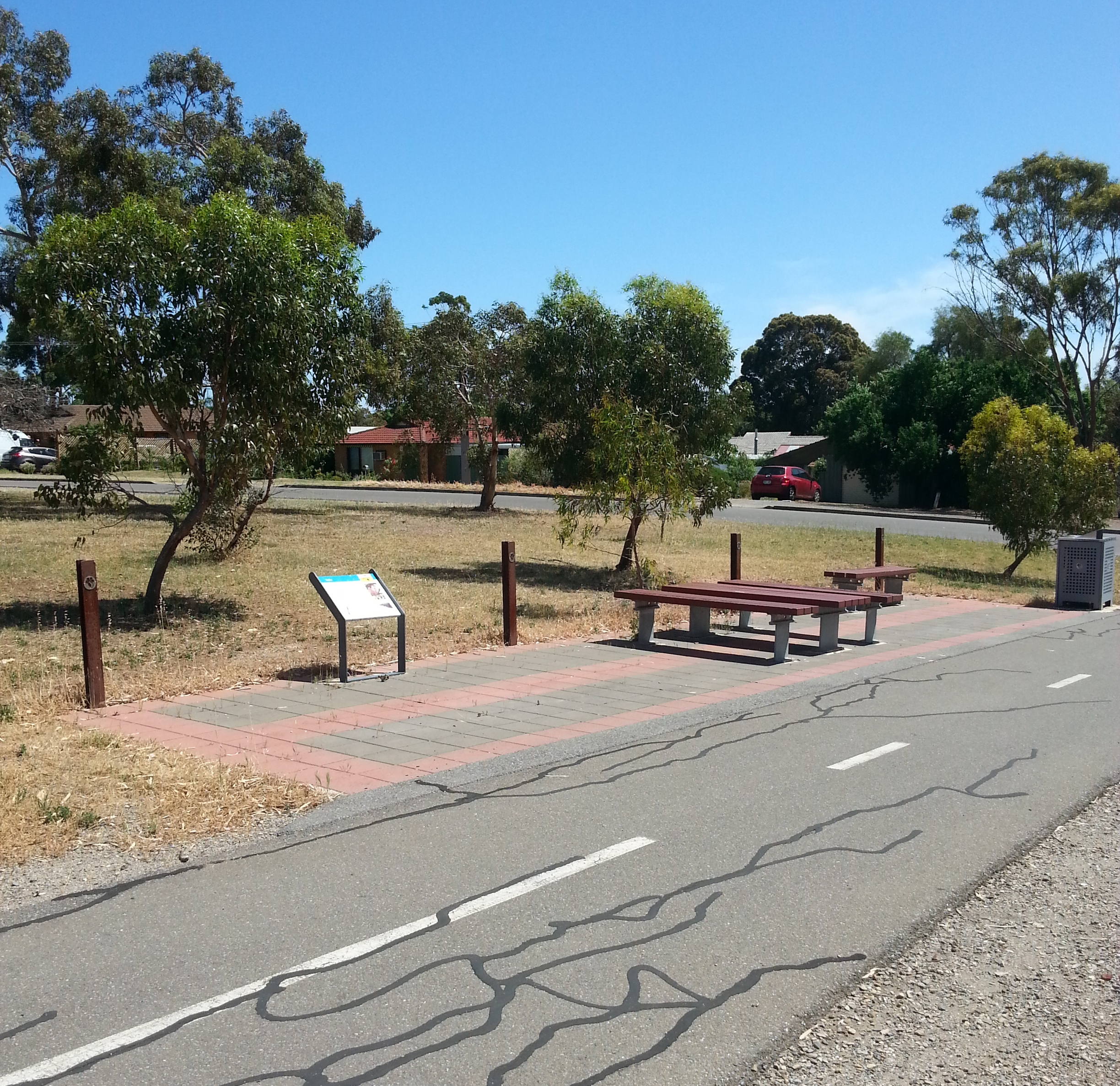
- Site of Yetto Railway Station, October 2015

General information
- Location: Australia
- Owner: South Australian Railways
- Operator: South Australian Railways
- Line: Willunga railway line
- Train operators: South Australian Railways

History
- Opened: 20 January 1915
- Closed: 1969

Services
Preceding station	South Australian Railways	Following station
Morphett Vale towards Adelaide	Willunga railway line	Hackham towards Willunga
Location

Yetto was a ground level stopping place during the passenger transport days of this line, and a 1965 reference mentioned that it was no longer used at that date. It was in what is now the suburb of Morphett Vale.

The stop is now completely disused, the entire Willunga railway line having been dismantled in 1972 and later replaced by the Coast to Vines Rail Trail.

== Photos ==
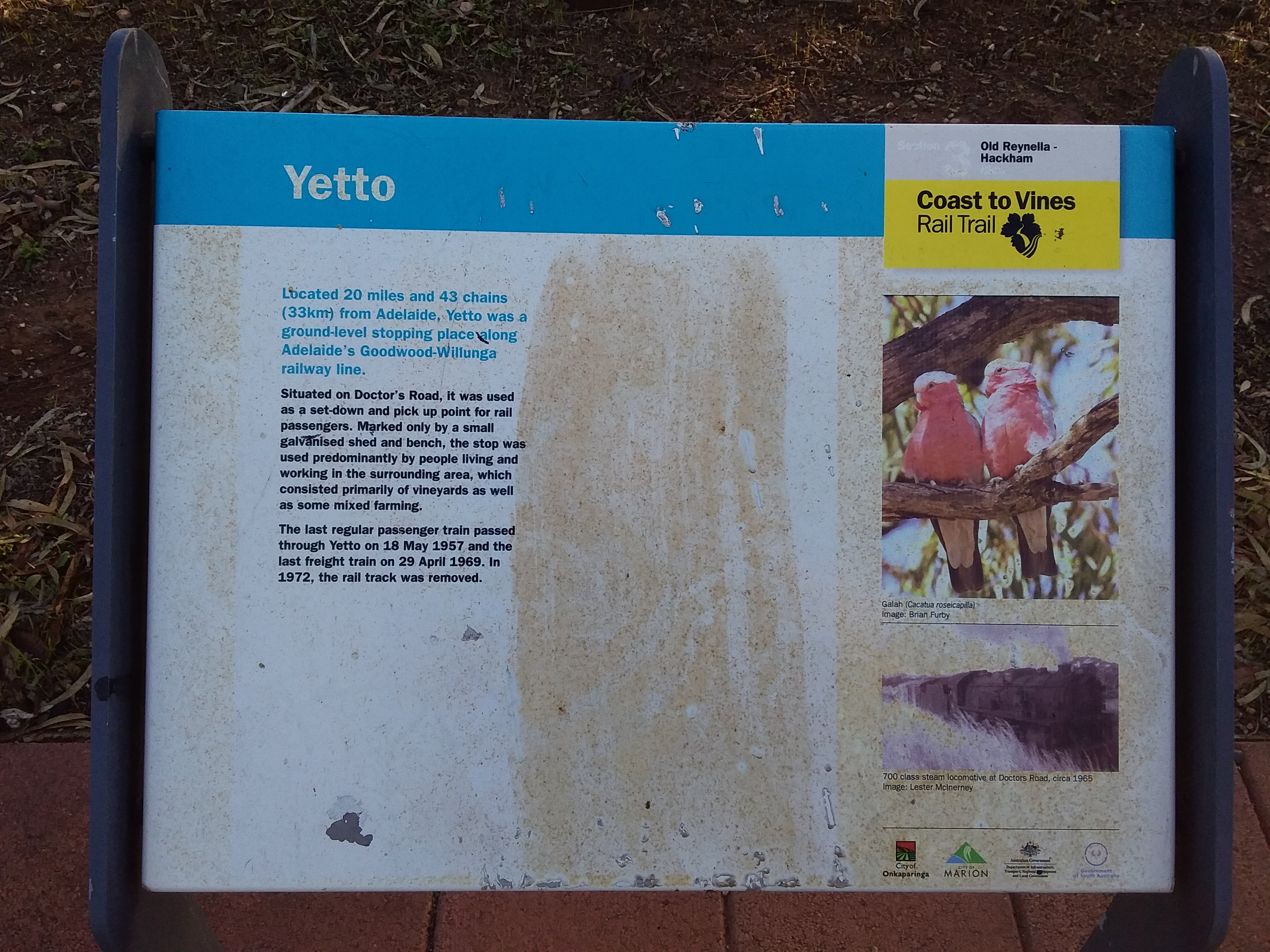

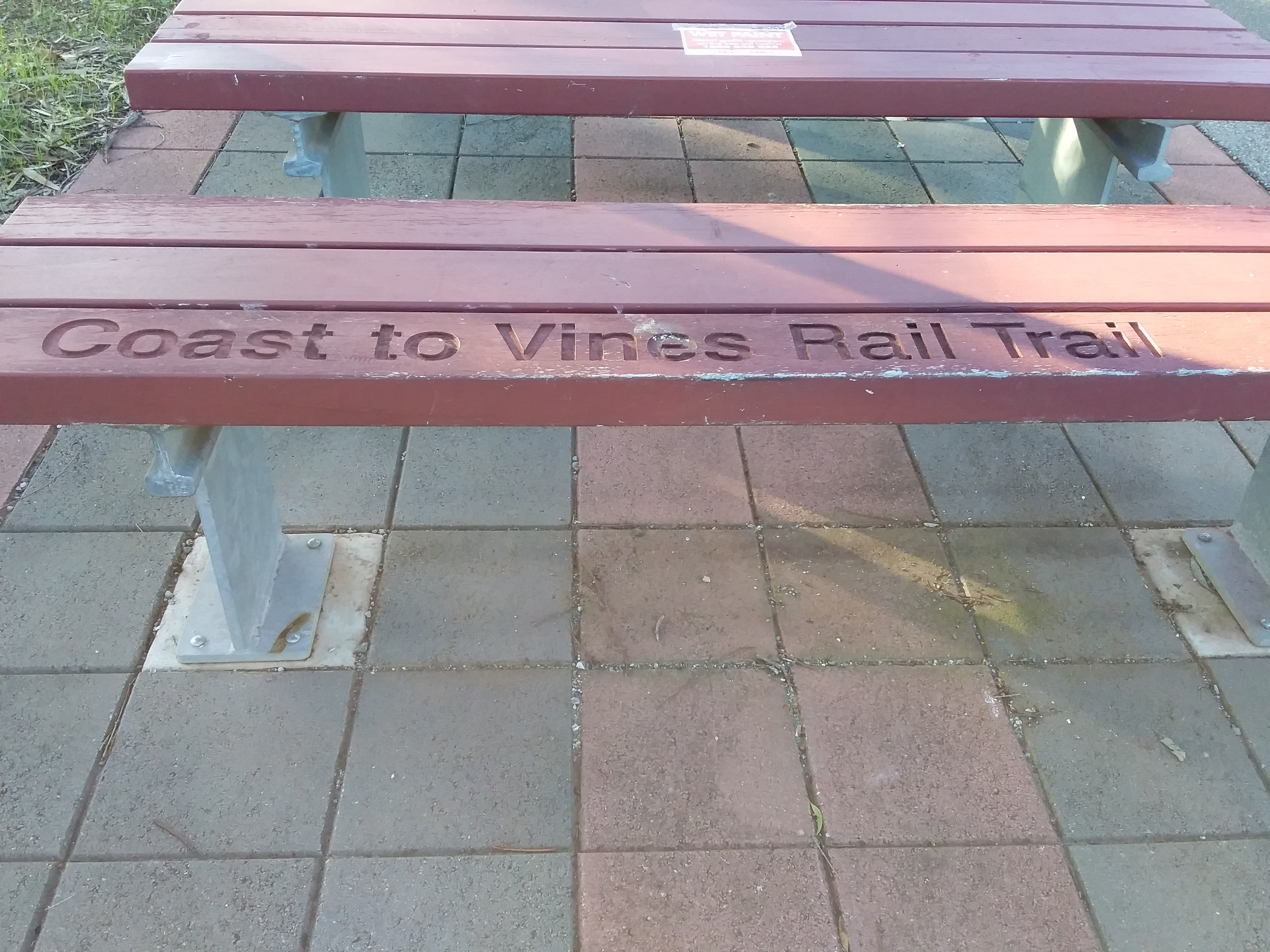

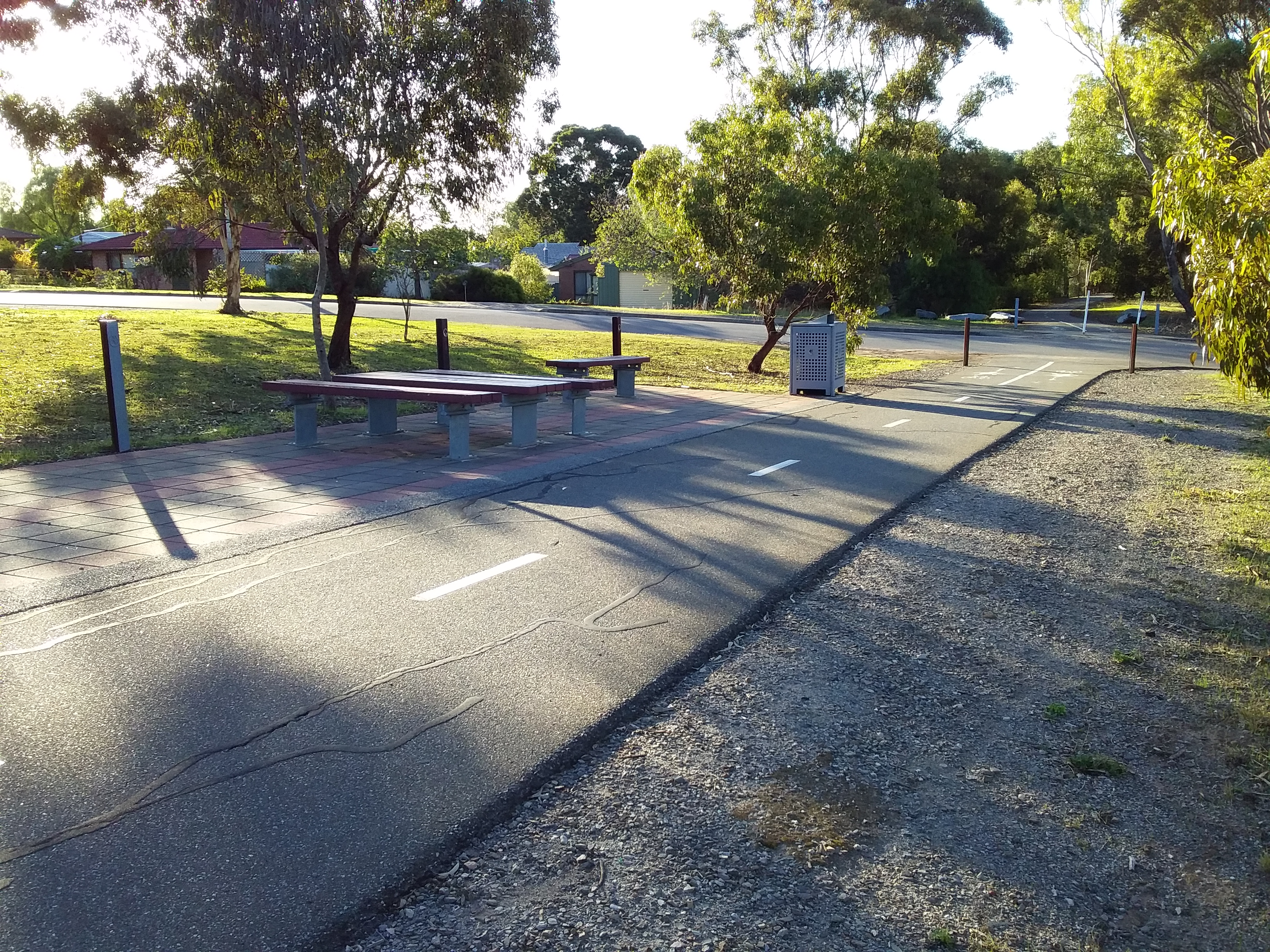

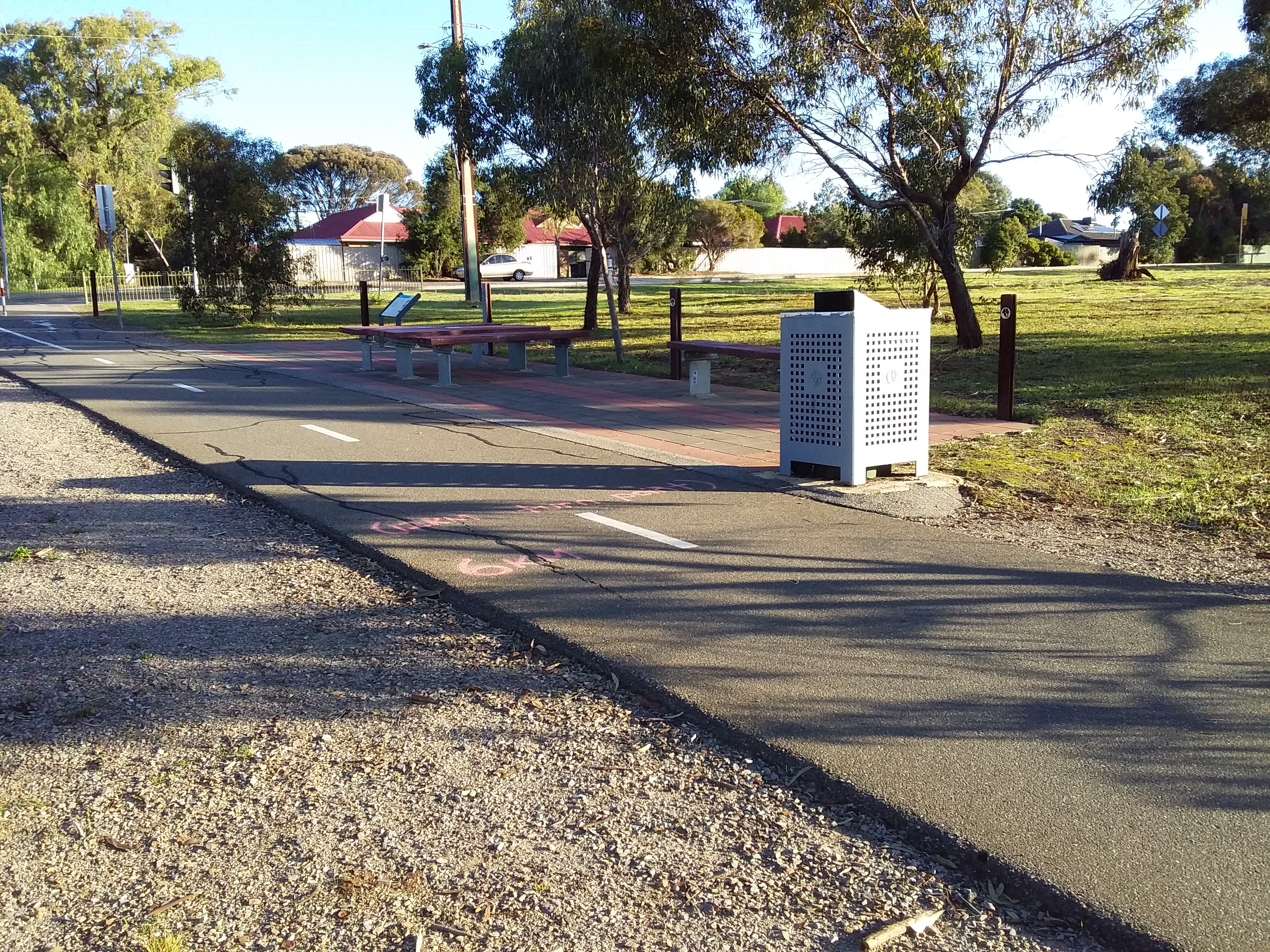

Photo of the former location of Yetto Railway Station. - May 2019
