= Taringa railway station, South Australia =

Former railway station in South Australia, Australia

Taringa

General information
- Location: South Australia; Australia
- Coordinates: 35.23575°S 138.55721°E
- Owner: South Australian Railways
- Operator: South Australian Railways
- Line: Willunga railway line
- Platforms: ground level
- Train operators: South Australian Railways

History
- Opened: 20 January 1915
- Closed: 1969

Services
Preceding station	South Australian Railways	Following station
Pikkara towards Adelaide	Willunga railway line	Willunga Terminus
Location

Taringa railway station was a ground level stopping place during the passenger transport days of the Willunga railway line which opened in 1915, and a 1965 reference mentioned that it was no longer used at that date.

The Willunga railway line was dismantled in 1972 and later replaced by the Coast to Vines Rail Trail. Taringa is marked by a picnic shelter near Binney Road between McLaren Vale and Willunga.
