= Happy Valley railway station =

Former railway station in South Australia, Australia

General information
- Location: Australia
- Coordinates: 35°04′53″S 138°32′38″E
- Owner: South Australian Railways
- Operator: South Australian Railways
- Line: Willunga railway line
- Train operators: South Australian Railways

History
- Opened: 20 January 1915
- Closed: 1969

Services
Preceding station	South Australian Railways	Following station
Patpa towards Adelaide	Willunga railway line	Reynella towards Willunga
Route map
Location

Happy Valley is a closed railway station in Adelaide, South Australia. It was a ground level stopping place during the passenger transport days of this line, and a 1965 reference mentioned that it was no longer used at that date.

A road bridge, carrying South Road on a diversion by-passing Reynella, crossed the line shortly after Happy Valley.

The stop is now completely destroyed, the entire Willunga railway line having been dismantled in 1972, and the site is now the location of the Panalatinga Road interchange of the Southern Expressway and Main South Road.
