= Patpa railway station =

Former railway station in South Australia, Australia

Patpa

General information
- Location: Australia
- Coordinates: 35.07917°S 138.51594°E
- Owner: South Australian Railways
- Operator: South Australian Railways
- Line: Willunga railway line
- Train operators: South Australian Railways

History
- Opened: 20 January 1915
- Closed: 1969

Services
Preceding station	South Australian Railways	Following station
Hallett Cove towards Adelaide	Willunga railway line	Happy Valley towards Willunga
Route map
Location

Patpa is a closed railway station in Adelaide, South Australia. It was a ground level stopping place during the passenger transport days of this line, and a 1965 reference mentioned that it was no longer used at that date.

The stop is now completely removed, the entire Willunga railway line having been dismantled in 1972. It was on what is now Patpa Drive near the Hallett Cove shopping centre on Lonsdale Road.
