= Tuni railway station, Adelaide =

Former railway station in South Australia, Australia

Tuni

General information
- Location: McLaren Vale; South Australia; Australia
- Coordinates: 35.208628°S 138.514303°E
- Owner: South Australian Railways
- Operator: South Australian Railways
- Line: Willunga railway line
- Platforms: ground level
- Train operators: South Australian Railways

History
- Opened: 20 January 1915
- Closed: 1969

Services
Preceding station	South Australian Railways	Following station
Moana towards Adelaide	Willunga railway line	McLaren Vale towards Willunga
Route map
Location

Tuni is a closed railway station in Adelaide, South Australia. It was located in what is now the western outskirts of the town of McLaren Vale.

It was a ground level stopping place during the passenger transport days of this line, and a 1965 reference mentioned that it was no longer used at that date.

The stop is now completely disused, the entire Willunga railway line having been dismantled in 1972, and now provides the route for the Coast to Vines Rail Trail.
