= Garrett, Texas =

- Town
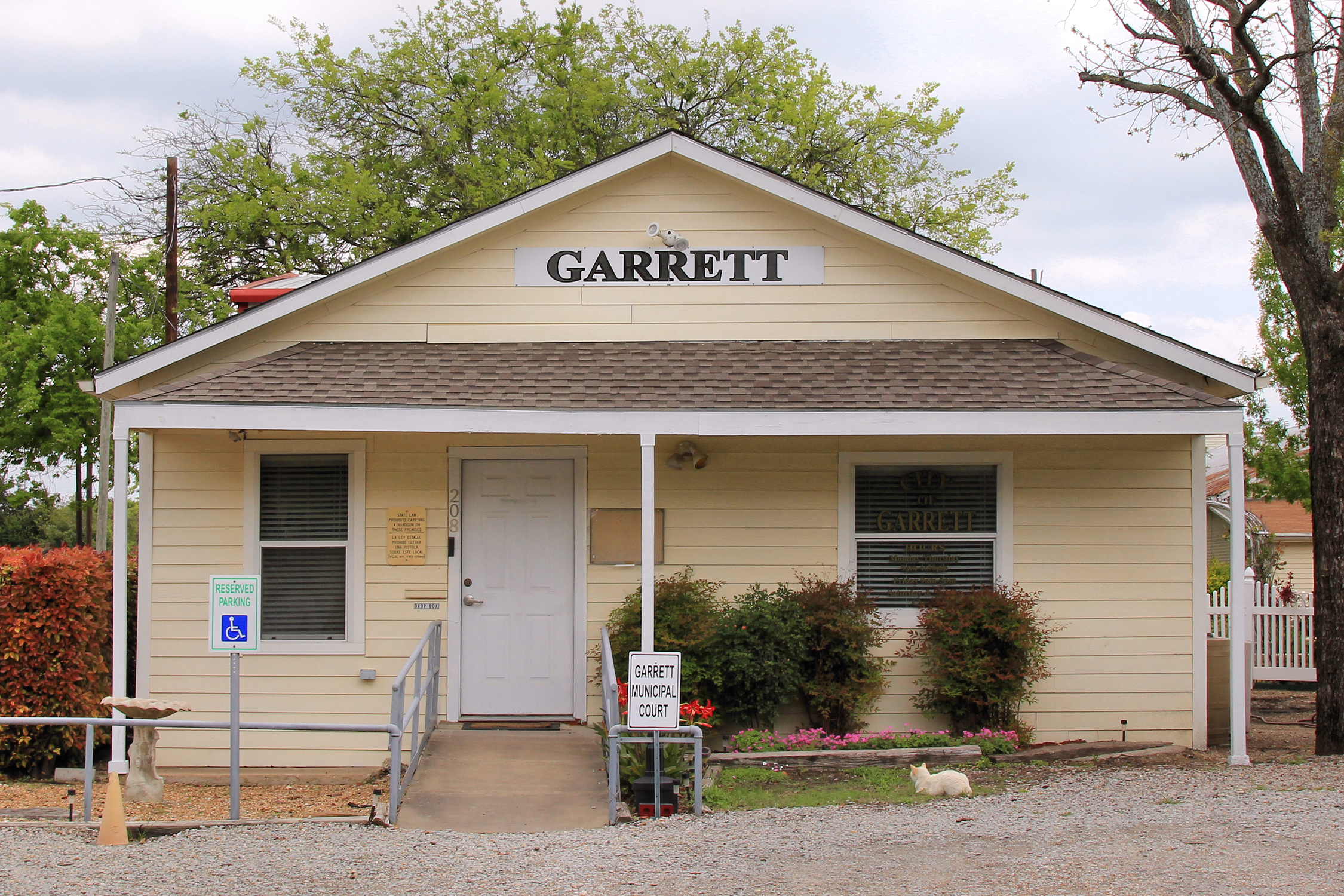
- City Hall

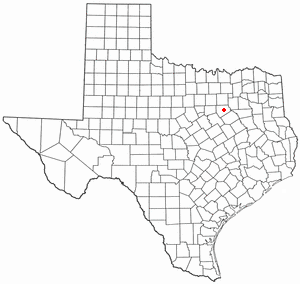
- Location of Garrett, Texas

- Coordinates: 32°22′22″N 96°39′12″W
- Country: United States
- State: Texas
- County: Ellis

Area
  - Total: 1.81 sq mi (4.70 km^{2})
  - Land: 1.80 sq mi (4.66 km^{2})
  - Water: 0.019 sq mi (0.05 km^{2})
- Elevation: 554 ft (169 m)

Population (2020)
  - Total: 829
  - Density: 461/sq mi (178/km^{2})
- Time zone: UTC-6 (Central (CST))
  - Summer (DST): UTC-5 (CDT)
- Area codes: 214, 469, 945, 972
- FIPS code: 48-29036
- GNIS feature ID: 2412670
- Website: cityofgarrett.com

Garrett is a town in Ellis County, Texas, United States. The population was 829 at the 2020 census, up from 806 at the 2010 census.

== Geography ==
Garrett is located in eastern Ellis County and is bordered to the south by the city of Ennis. Interstate 45 passes along the eastern edge of the town, with access from Exit 255. I-45 leads north 32 miles (51 km) to downtown Dallas and south 209 miles (336 km) to Houston.

According to the United States Census Bureau, Garrett has a total area of 1.8 square miles (4.7 km^{2}), of which 0.019 square miles (0.05 km^{2}), or 1.00%, is water.

== Demographics ==
Historical population
Census	Pop.	Note	%±
1960	167		—
1970	225		34.7%
1980	220		−2.2%
1990	340		54.5%
2000	448		31.8%
2010	806		79.9%
2020	829		2.9%
U.S. Decennial Census; 2020 Census

As of the census of 2000, there were 448 people, 147 households, and 118 families residing in the town. The population density was 1,338.9 inhabitants per square mile (517.0/km^{2}). There were 158 housing units at an average density of 472.2 per square mile (182.3/km^{2}). The racial makeup of the town was 71.43% White, 0.67% African American, 1.56% Pacific Islander, 22.54% from other races, and 3.79% from two or more races. Hispanic or Latino of any race were 35.27% of the population.

There were 147 households, out of which 45.6% had children under the age of 18 living with them, 59.9% were married couples living together, 16.3% had a female householder with no husband present, and 19.7% were non-families. 14.3% of all households were made up of individuals, and 3.4% had someone living alone who was 65 years of age or older. The average household size was 3.05 and the average family size was 3.32.

In the town, the population was spread out, with 33.5% under the age of 18, 11.6% from 18 to 24, 31.0% from 25 to 44, 19.2% from 45 to 64, and 4.7% who were 65 years of age or older. The median age was 30 years. For every 100 females, there were 98.2 males. For every 100 females age 18 and over, there were 91.0 males.

The median income for a household in the town was $40,104, and the median income for a family was $40,469. Males had a median income of $27,132 versus $20,938 for females. The per capita income for the town was $16,810. About 8.9% of families and 14.5% of the population were below the poverty line, including 25.2% of those under age 18 and none of those age 65 or over.

== Education ==
Garrett is served by the Ennis Independent School District.

== Police protection ==
The town's police department consists of one police chief and two full-time police officers. The city also has four reserve police officers who assist the city in the daily police operations. The police department recently updated their police vehicles. The vehicles are two Dodge Durangos which are fully equipped with lights and sirens and visible police markings to serve the town of Garrett. Garrett Police patrols the town of Garrett as well as monitoring traffic on Interstate I-45.

== Fire protection ==
The town is served by two fire departments, Garrett Rural Fire Department (formerly Garrett Fire Department) and Garrett City Fire Department. Garrett Rural has two stations with multiple engines and multiple brush trucks, with a large membership that covers the area outside the town limits. Garrett City covers the town limits and consists of one station with an older engine and older utility bed pickup, and with a membership of about 10 firefighters.

== Notable person ==
- Norma Gabler, conservative Christian activist and textbook campaigner
