= Coorara railway station =

Former railway station in South Australia, Australia

Coorara

General information
- Location: Cnr Bains Rd & Vanstone Ave, Morphett Vale; Australia
- Coordinates: 35.12243°S 138.5299°E
- Owner: South Australian Railways
- Operator: South Australian Railways
- Line: Willunga railway line
- Distance: 19 miles 10 chains (30.8 km)
- Platforms: 1 side
- Train operators: South Australian Railways

History
- Opened: 20 January 1915
- Closed: 29 April 1969

Services
Preceding station	South Australian Railways	Following station
Pimpala towards Adelaide	Willunga railway line	Morphett Vale towards Willunga
Location

Coorara is a closed railway station in Adelaide, South Australia. It was a ground level stopping place during the passenger transport days of this line, and a 1965 reference mentioned that it was no longer used at that date.

The stop is now completely disused, the entire Willunga railway line having been dismantled in 1972.
