= Moana railway station =

Former railway station in South Australia, Australia

Moana

General information
- Location: Australia
- Coordinates: 35.1906°S 138.48597°E
- Owner: South Australian Railways
- Operator: South Australian Railways
- Line: Willunga railway line
- Train operators: South Australian Railways

History
- Opened: 20 January 1915
- Closed: 1969

Services
Preceding station	South Australian Railways	Following station
Noarlunga towards Adelaide	Willunga railway line	Tuni towards Willunga
Location

Moana is a defunct railway station in Adelaide, South Australia.

In 1928, weekend train services were introduced between Moana and Adelaide, just in time for that year's Foundation Day celebrations.

It was a ground level stopping place during the passenger transport days of this line, and a 1965 reference mentioned that it was no longer used at that date.

There was a smaller stop following this called 'Noarlunga Sand Siding' opened in 1928 for loading sand which closed in September 1950. A 1965 reference remarks that traces of the old siding could still be seen at that date on the curve before Pedlars Creek Road crossing.

The Seaford railway station, built in 2014 on the Seaford railway line, is located approximately 300m from the site of Moana station. The Willunga line closed in 1969 and was dismantled in 1972.

== Bibliography ==
- Australian Railway Historical Society Bulletin No 336, October 1965
