= Navajo (train) =

Overview
- Predecessor: Tourist Flyer
- First service: October 1, 1915
- Last service: January 14, 1940
- Former operator(s): Atchison, Topeka and Santa Fe Railway

Route
- Termini: Chicago; San Francisco
- Train number(s): 9/10

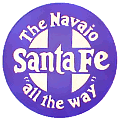
"Drumhead" logos such as this often adorned the ends of the observation cars on the Navajo.

The Navajo was one of the named passenger trains of the Atchison, Topeka and Santa Fe Railway. The all-coach train began daily service between Chicago-Los Angeles-San Francisco as Train No. 9 (eastbound) and Train No. 2 (westbound) on October 1, 1915, as a replacement for the railroad's Tourist Flyer. In 1936, the westbound train was renumbered from Train No. 2 to Train No. 10. The Navajo was discontinued on January 14, 1940.

In Summer 1926, Train No. 9 was scheduled to leave Chicago at 9:45 a.m. on day one, arriving in Los Angeles on the third day at 7:30 a.m. It ran via Topeka, St. John, and Pasadena and carried no diner west of Kansas City - making three meal stops a day.

In November 1939, Train No. 9 left Chicago at 1:35 a.m. on day one, arriving in Los Angeles on the third day at 11:40 a.m. - 60 hours using the same route except via Great Bend. (For several years earlier in the 1930s, westward Train No. 2 shifted to the “Southern” route via Amarillo and Belen, then both trains ran via Amarillo for a year or two before returning to the “Northern” route via “Raton Pass”.)

The Navajo name was also carried by a Santa Fe sleeper-lounge-observation cars built by the Budd Company in 1937 for the Super Chief. The car is on display at the Colorado Railroad Museum.

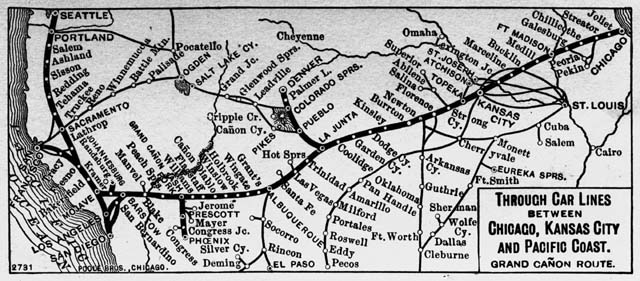
A map depicting the "Grand Canyon Route" of the Atchison, Topeka & Santa Fe Railway circa 1901, and it pre-dates the construction of the “Southern” route (via Belen and Amarillo), which started in 1908.

== See also ==
- Passenger train service on the Atchison, Topeka and Santa Fe Railway
