= Mel and Norma Gabler =

Fundamentalists and school textbook reformers

Mel and Norma Gabler were religious fundamentalists active in United States school textbook reform between 1961 and the 2000s based in Longview, Texas.

Norma Gabler started her foray into school book banning in 1961 when her son pointed out how the phrase "one nation under God" was missing from the Gettysburg Address, which inspired her to complain to the State Board of Education. Note that Lincoln's address supposedly contained the phrase "this nation, under God", though scholars disagree on the exact wording of the speech. Both Mel and Norma Gabler then proceeded to heavily influence which textbook were adopted by the public school curriculum in the state of Texas for the next four decades. Norma advocated against several concepts in school textbooks, including but not limited to evolution, women's liberation, and secularism, instead pushing right-wing Christian values to be adopted as the curriculum. The Gablers' campaign in many ways laid the foundation for book banning in contemporary school libraries in the United States.

Melvin Nolan Freeman Gabler was born in Katy, Texas and died at age 89 on December 19, 2004, after suffering a brain hemorrhage two days prior. He served in the Army Air Force during World War II and later worked for Esso, a precursor of ExxonMobil, retiring in 1974. Norma Elizabeth Gabler (née Rhodes) was born in Garrett, Texas on June 16, 1923, and died on July 22, 2007, from Parkinson's disease.

The Gablers founded Educational Research Analysts and formally incorporated as a non-profit organization in 1973.
