= Educational Research Analysts =

Organization to monitor public school textbooks

Educational Research Analysts is an organization based in Longview, Texas, United States, founded by Mel and Norma Gabler to monitor public school textbooks. The organization reviews books to locate factual errors and to promote a conservative Christian point of view, offering preference to textbooks which, for example, promote sexual abstinence rather than contraception and firearms safety rather than gun control. They launched the organization in 1961 from their kitchen table in tiny Hawkins in Wood County in east Texas, after having begun to review textbooks assigned to their son. Many of the books that the Gablers have given high ratings have been adopted by the Texas State Textbook Committee. If a school district wishes textbooks with other viewpoints than those approved by the state committee, it must fund such materials from its own resources.

== Criticism ==
Teachers, professors, parents, and civil libertarians have alleged that the Gablers promoted their fundamentalist views in the textbook selection process. Critics have pointed out that the Gablers, who did not have college degrees, assumed the role of textbook monitors and claimed editorial authority over textbook authors. Many criticized the State Board of Education for giving the Gablers undue influence.

== See also ==
- Creation–evolution controversy
