= Reynella railway station =

Former railway station in South Australia, Australia

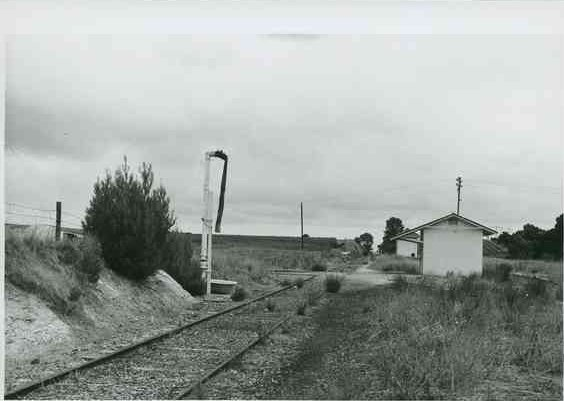
- Reynella railway station in 1970 looking south. Glen Rowan vineyard is on the left of the railway line. The ticket office is in the background and the water pump is on the left

General information
- Location: Australia
- Coordinates: 35.09512°S 138.53912°E
- Owner: South Australian Railways
- Operator: South Australian Railways
- Line: Willunga railway line
- Distance: 28.2 km
- Train operators: South Australian Railways

History
- Opened: 20 January 1915
- Closed: 1969

Services
Preceding station	South Australian Railways	Following station
Happy Valley towards Adelaide	Willunga railway line	Pimpala towards Willunga
Route map
Location

Reynella railway station was a railway station in Reynella, South Australia that was part of the Willunga railway line. A station master was appointed in 1915, but by 1965 it was a non-attended crossing station. Water was available for locomotive purposes. Commercial operations ceased in 1969.

The Willunga railway line and its stations were dismantled in 1972, and have since been mostly replaced by a bicycle path and/or road. A bus interchange was built on the site of the Reynella railway station.
