= Basque, British Columbia =

Basque
- Unincorporated community
- Location within British Columbia Location within Canada
- Coordinates: 50°38′N 121°18′W
- Country: Canada
- Province: British Columbia
- Region: Thompson Country
- Regional District: Thompson-Nicola Regional District
- Time zone: UTC−07:00 (PT)

Basque, British Columbia, is located in the province of British Columbia, Canada, near the village of Ashcroft. It is the post office and whistlestop-crossing on the historic Basque Ranch, one of the earliest ranches in the Interior of British Columbia. One of the descendants of the Basque family is Garnet Basque, a notable popular historian in BC who has written extensively on ranching and the gold rush history.

Basque is notable as the location where the Canadian Northern Railway drove its Last Spike in 1915.

Basque is a connection point between the Canadian Pacific and Canadian National Railroads in the lower Thompson River Valley. This is where the uni-directional running of both railroads stops and they revert to running both ways on their own tracks. The other point is at Mission, just east of Vancouver.
