= Willunga railway line =

Former railway line in Adelaide, South Australia

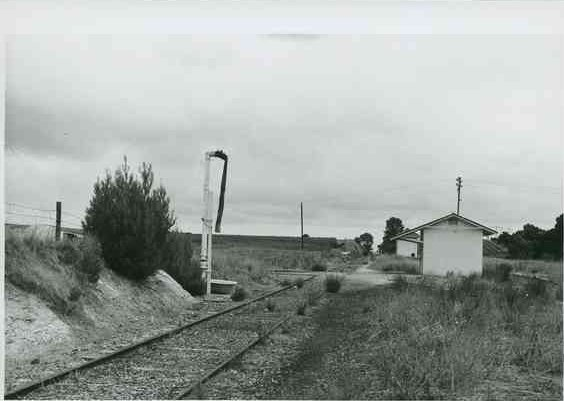
- Reynella railway station in 1968

Overview
- Status: closed and removed
- Locale: South Australia
- Termini: Adelaide; Willunga

Service
- Type: goods and passengers
- System: South Australian Railways

History
- Opened: 20 January 1915
- Closed: 1969

Technical
- Track gauge: 5 ft 3 in (1,600 mm)
- Minimum radius: 12 chains (790 ft; 240 m)
- Highest elevation: 437 ft (133 m) ruling grade: 1 in 45

The Willunga railway line was a railway line on the South Australian Railways network.

== History ==
The line opened on 20 January 1915 by Sir Henry Galway who was the Governor of South Australia at that time. It ran through the southern Adelaide suburbs from Adelaide railway station to Willunga, over 45-kilometre (28 mi) long (longer than the current Gawler line). It had 16 stopping places between Adelaide and Willunga. It closed beyond Hallett Cove in 1969. In September 1972, a track-removal train dismantled the track between Hallett Cove and Willunga. The Seaford railway line continues from Hallett Cove along a different alignment before rejoining the route of the old line between Seaford Road and Griffiths Drive.

Map of the line

The original corridor remains as the 34-kilometre (21 mi) long Coast to Vines Rail Trail. There is some evidence of railway track remaining on this trail, notably near the South Road crossing at Hackham, the top of the Seaford Hill and a small section of track in a paddock adjacent to Victor Harbor Road, McLaren Vale. Occasionally, rails surface through the bitumen at Field Street, McLaren Vale. Most station infrastructure was demolished except for a buried goods platform at Morphett Vale, and the passenger platform and building at Willunga.

At the time of its opening, there was a proposal to extend it to Second Valley to connect with coastal steam shipping to Kangaroo Island for holidays, with the route already approved as far as Normanville and Yankalilla. This extension was never built.
