= Willunga railway station =

Former railway station in South Australia, Australia

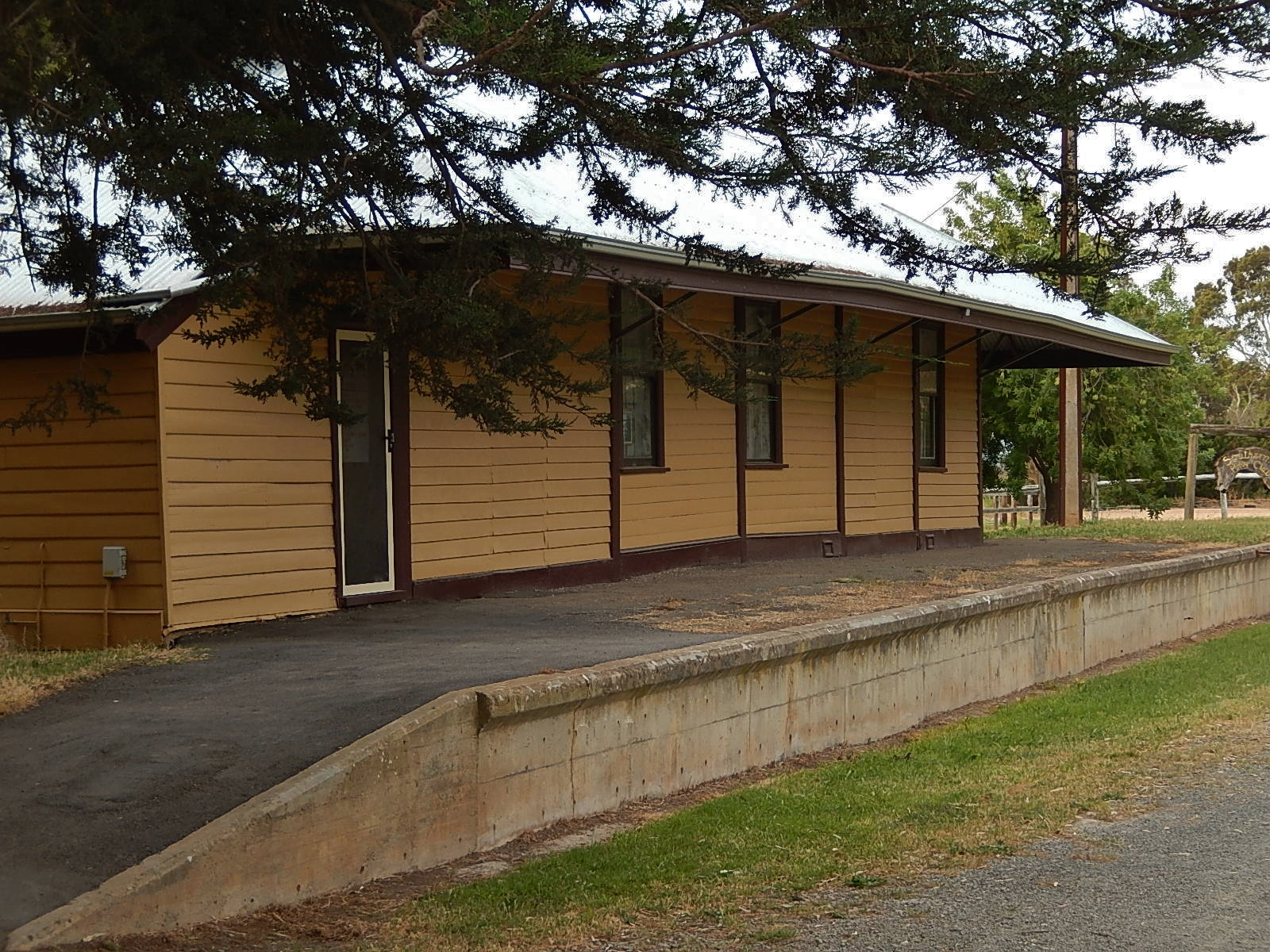

General information
- Location: Willunga, South Australia; Australia
- Coordinates: 35.26767°S 138.55199°E
- Owner: South Australian Railways
- Operator: South Australian Railways
- Line: Willunga railway line
- Train operators: South Australian Railways

Construction
- Structure type: turntable (until 1941); triangle (after 1930)

History
- Opened: 20 January 1915
- Closed: 1969

Services
Preceding station	South Australian Railways	Following station
Taringa towards Adelaide	Willunga railway line	Terminus
Location

Willunga is a closed railway station in Willunga, South Australia. It was the terminus of the Willunga railway line.

A station-master was appointed in 1915. A 60 feet turntable was installed during construction, but was removed to Marino in 1941–2. The triangle, later in use, was built around 1930.

The one train per week freight service, introduced in 1963, was scheduled so that locomotives did not stable at Willunga overnight and consequently, tenders were called for demolition of the employee's barracks and other engine facilities.

The stop is now unused as the entire Willunga line was dismantled in 1972. The station building and platform remain.
