= Glenelg railway line =

Former railway line in South Australia

Overview
- Status: Converted into Glenelg tram line

Service
- Operator(s): South Australian Railways

History
- Opened: 4 August 1873
- Closed: 2 April 1929

Technical
- Track gauge: 1,600 mm (5 ft 3 in)

The Glenelg railway line is a former railway line in Adelaide, South Australia.

== History ==
=== Operation ===
The line was opened by the Adelaide, Glenelg & Suburban Railway Company on 2 August 1873. The single track line was built to the 5 ft 3 in (1,600 mm) broad gauge, commencing at the Angas Street corner of King William Street and followed that thoroughfare to South Terrace, then ran through the South Parklands and the south-western suburbs on its own right of way to Brighton Road, Glenelg where street running recommenced, using Jetty Road to terminate outside the Pier Hotel on Moseley Square. A depot was erected in the parklands at South Terrace. It was operated by small 2-4-0 tank locomotives, hauling two-axle end loading passenger carriages and open wagons for cargo. Raised platforms were not provided, the carriages being provided with steps for ground level loading. Run round loops were installed at Glenelg and South Terrace, trains being propelled in one direction along King William Street. Special services operated to Morphettville Racecourse after it opened in September 1873. Crossing loops were later installed at Goodwood and South Plympton.

Patronage during the first few years of operation rose from 468,000 in the first year (1873–74) to 727,000 in 1877–88. On 24 May 1880, the Holdfast Railway Company opened the Holdfast Bay line from Adelaide railway station to Glenelg. It used the tracks of the South Australian Railways (SAR) between Adelaide and Mile End while a depot was built at St Leonards. Whilst one line was a profitable proposition, two were not, and both lines were almost immediately in financial trouble and merged to form the Glenelg Railway Company on 11 May 1882. A connecting line was laid along Brighton Road and the South Terrace depot closed. In 1882, a horse tramway was laid along King William Street parallel to the railway. Local services between Angas Street and Goodwood were introduced by the railway using a Merryweather tram motor with an unpowered Rowan car as a trailer. In 1883 the SAR's Belair line was extended towards the South Coast and crossed the Glenelg line at Goodwood station via a flat crossing. The Holdfast Bay line was the most unprofitable of the two, this being partly due to excessive charges by the SAR for use of its line. Moves were made to close the line but these met with strong opposition as closure would isolate Glenelg from the rest of the state. To overcome this it was proposed to lay in a connection at Goodwood.

In December 1899, the private company was acquired by the SAR, who continued to operate the line as a steam railway. The Glenelg line was duplicated from Goodwood to Brighton Road by 1910. The Holdfast Bay line was also duplicated from Mile End to St Leonards by 1914 with raised platforms being provided at most stations. To help reduce working expenses it was proposed to deviate the Holdfast Bay line to join the other at Morphettville and although a line was built, no connection was made and it was only used for race traffic. The Adelaide tramways had been electrified and to enable the line in King William Street to be duplicated, the railway was cut back to South Terrace in 1914. Railway passengers were carried by tram to Victoria Square.

=== Closure ===
In 1927, ownership and operation transferred from the SAR to the Municipal Tramways Trust (MTT). Steam trains ceased on 2 April 1929 and the line was closed to be rebuilt as a double track standard gauge, electrified at 600 V dc and converted to tramway operation. The Goodwood Overpass was constructed at this time, separating the new tram tracks from the conventional railway. The line was reopened on 14 December 1929 with the city terminus reverting to Victoria Square. The Holdfast Bay line closed on 15 December 1929 for conversion but this was not undertaken due to the onset of the Great Depression. Thirty H type trams were built for the line, with a design influenced by North American interurban streetcars of that era.
