= Glenelg tram line =

Tram line in Adelaide, South Australia

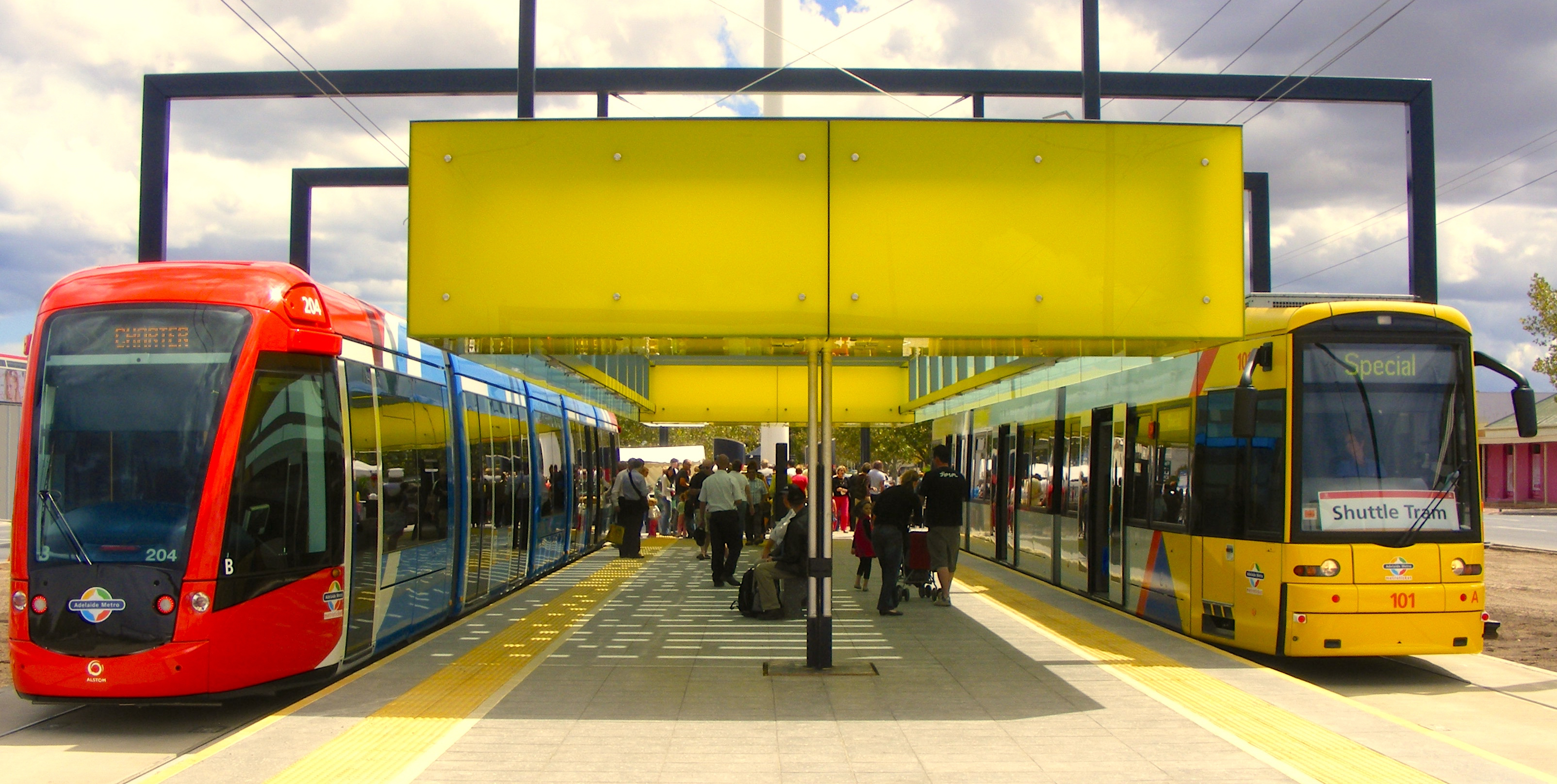
- Alstom Citadis 302 & Bombardier Flexity Classic trams at the Adelaide Entertainment Centre terminus

Overview
- Locale: Adelaide, South Australia (Map)
- Termini: Adelaide Entertainment Centre (Hindmarsh) and Botanic Garden; Moseley Square, Glenelg
- Stations: 33

Service
- Type: Tram/light rail
- Operator: Adelaide Metro
- Depot: Glengowrie
- Rolling stock: Bombardier Flexity Classic; Alstom Citadis 302

History
- Opened: 4 August 1873
- Electrified and gauge-converted: 14 December 1929

Technical
- Num of tracks: 2
- Track gauge: 1435 mm (4 ft 8 1/2 in) standard gauge
- Old gauge: 1600 mm (5 ft 3 in) (until electrified in 1929)
- Electrification: 600 V DC from overhead catenary
- Operating speed: Up to 60 kilometres per hour (37 mph)

The Glenelg tram line is a tram/light rail line in Adelaide. The line has its own reservation for most of its length, with street-running sections in the city centre and Glenelg.

The service is free in the city centre and along the route to the Adelaide Entertainment Centre in Hindmarsh. The service is also free along the length of Jetty Road, Glenelg to Moseley Square. Three routes in total operate on the network: Glenelg to the Royal Adelaide Hospital, with select peak services that continue to the Adelaide Entertainment Centre; Glenelg to the Adelaide Festival Centre, which operates only on weekends and Adelaide Oval event days; and the Adelaide Entertainment Centre to the Adelaide Botanic Garden.

Services between the city and Glenelg follow the same route since its conversion to tram operation in 1929 and survived the tram network closures of the 50s. The line has been gradually extended through the city centre since the 2000s, with the latest extension opening in 2018.

== History ==
=== Inception ===
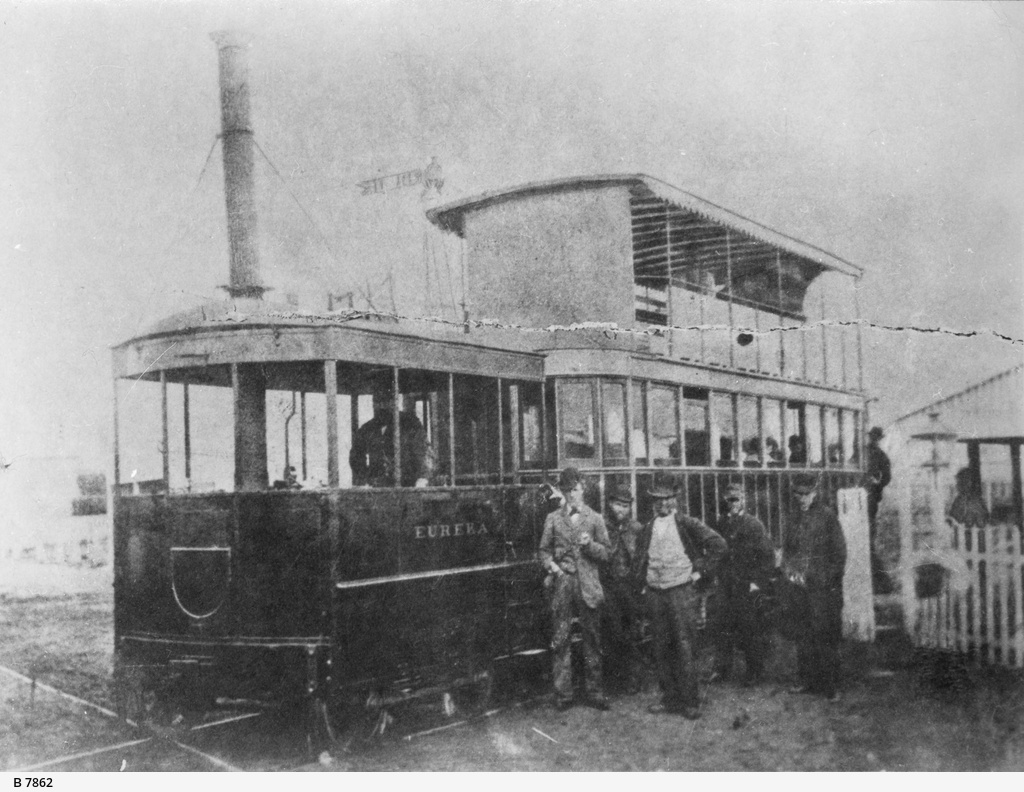
Eureka steam motor purchased second-hand from Port Adelaide and Queenstown Tramway Company in April 1883. Used on Glenelg line between South Terrace and Goodwood.

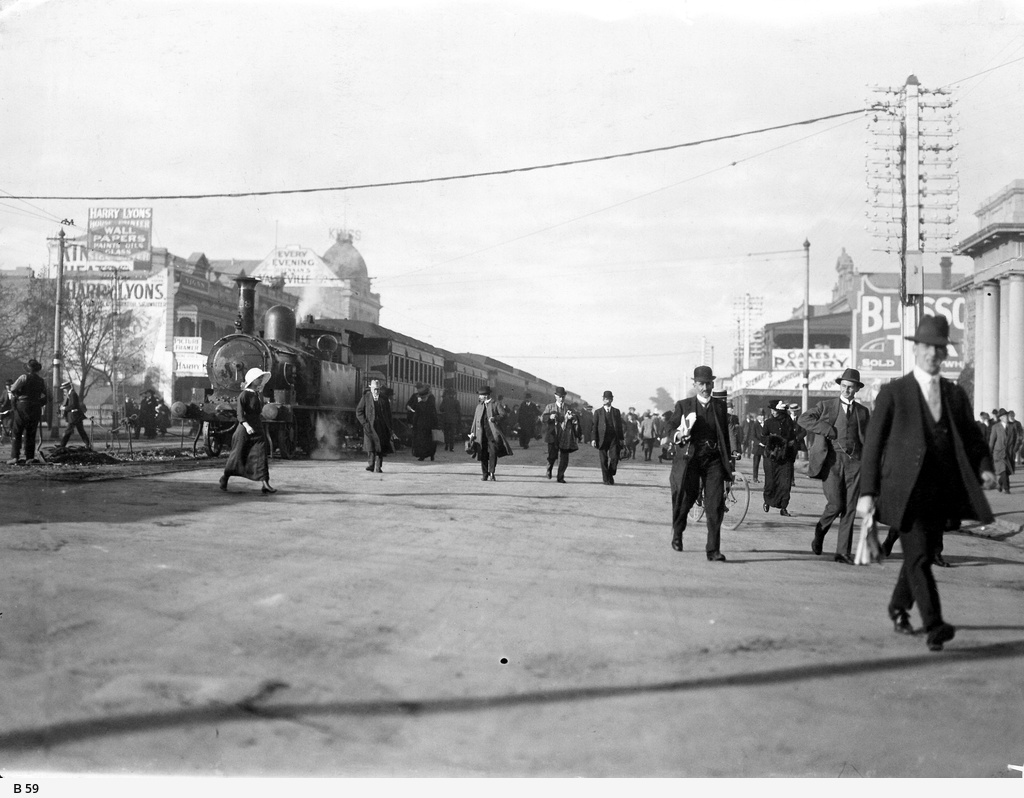
The last day a steam train ran up King William Street in 1914

The line, originally named the Adelaide and Glenelg Railway, was built by a private company – the Adelaide, Glenelg & Suburban Railway Company – opening on 2 August 1873. The single track line was built to 5 ft 3 in (1600 mm) broad gauge, commencing at the Angas Street corner of King William Street and followed that thoroughfare to South Terrace, then ran through the South Parklands and the south-western suburbs on its own right of way to Brighton Road, Glenelg where street running recommenced, using Jetty Road to terminate outside the Pier Hotel on Moseley Square. A depot was erected in the parklands at South Terrace.

It was operated by small 2-4-0 tank locomotives, hauling two-axle end loading passenger carriages and open wagons for cargo. Raised platforms were not provided, the carriages being provided with steps for ground level loading. Run round loops were installed at Glenelg and South Terrace, trains being propelled in one direction along King William Street. Special services operated to Morphettville Racecourse after it opened in September 1873. Crossing loops were later installed at Goodwood and South Plympton.

Patronage during the first few years of operation rose from 468,000 in the first year (1873–74) to 727,000 in 1877–88.

On 24 May 1880, the Holdfast Railway Company opened the Holdfast Bay line from Adelaide railway station to Glenelg. It used the tracks of the South Australian Railways (SAR) between Adelaide and Mile End while a depot was built at St Leonards. Whilst one line was a profitable proposition, two were not, and both lines were almost immediately in financial trouble and merged to form the Glenelg Railway Company on 11 May 1882. A connecting line was laid along Brighton Road and the South Terrace depot was closed.

In 1882, a horse tramway was laid along King William Street parallel to the railway. Local services between Angas Street and Goodwood were introduced by the railway using a Merryweather tram motor with an unpowered Rowan car as a trailer. In 1883 the SAR's Belair line was extended towards the South Coast and crossed the Glenelg line at Goodwood station via a flat crossing.

The Holdfast Bay line was the more unprofitable of the two, in part because of excessive charges by the SAR for use of its line. Moves were made to close the line but these met with strong opposition since closure would isolate Glenelg from the rest of the state. To overcome this it was proposed to lay in a connection at Goodwood.

In December 1899, the company was acquired by the SAR, who continued to operate the line as a steam railway. The Glenelg line was duplicated from Goodwood to Brighton Road by 1910. The Holdfast Bay line was also duplicated from Mile End to St Leonards by 1914 with raised platforms being provided at most stations. To help reduce working expenses it was proposed to deviate the Holdfast Bay line to join the other at Morphettville and although a line was built, no connection was made and it was only used for people attending Morphettville Raceourse. The Adelaide tramways had been electrified and to enable the line in King William Street to be duplicated, the railway was cut back to South Terrace in 1914. Railway passengers were carried by tram to Victoria Square.

=== Municipal Tramways Trust ===
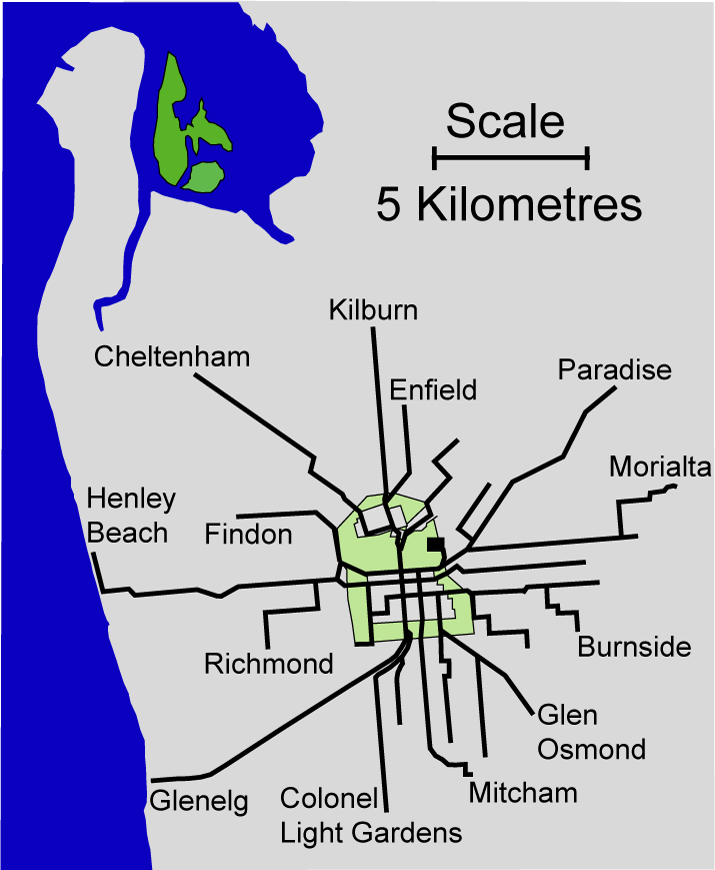
The electric tram network in the late 1950s

In 1927, ownership and operation transferred from the SAR to the Municipal Tramways Trust (MTT). Steam trains ceased on 2 April 1929 and the line was closed to be rebuilt as a double track standard gauge, electrified at 600 V dc and converted to tramway operation. The Goodwood Overpass was constructed at this time, separating the new tram tracks from the conventional railway. The line was reopened on 14 December 1929 with the city terminus reverting to Victoria Square. The Holdfast Bay line closed on 15 December 1929 for conversion but this was not undertaken due to the onset of the Great Depression.

Thirty type H trams were built for the line to a design influenced by North American interurban cars of that era.

There were one or two quirks in the earlier years, the most famous being the tram-hauled trailers for horses that operated in the 1930s. These were trams specially constructed to carry race horses from stables located along the line to Morphettville Racecourse. This service was a carry-over from the days of the steam railway, which had also performed this function. Another unusual feature was operation of triple sets of type H trams in peak hours, and express trams that ran non-stop over a significant portion of the route.

The line was the only route to survive the closure of Adelaide's street tramway network during the 1950s, saved largely by its high proportion of reserved track, which enables fast journey for passengers and minimal interference with road traffic.

In the mid-1970s, about 3000 trips to the city were made "on an average day". The depot was relocated on 19 October 1986 from the corner of Angas Street and Victoria Square in central Adelaide to a new facility at Glengowrie, close to Glenelg.

=== Renaissance ===
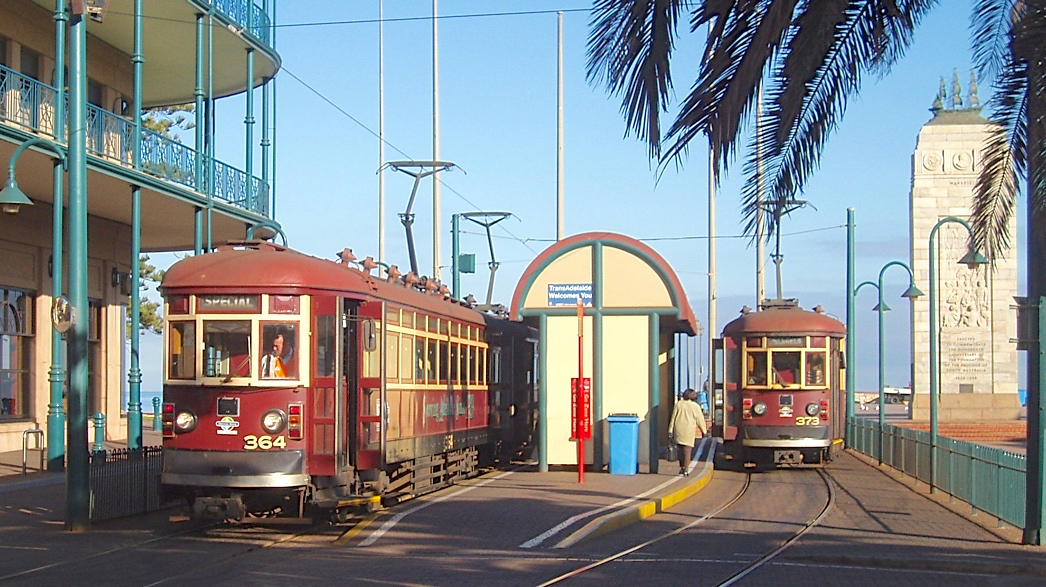
Type H "Bay" trams wait at the Moseley Square terminus before the stop was reconfigured, May 2006

In the 21st century, a series of investments were made to improve and extend the line. This began in May 2003 when the South Australian Government announced an upgrade of the Glenelg line infrastructure and the introduction of new trams.

Major work to upgrade the line took place between 5 June and 7 August 2005. Concrete sleepers were installed and much of the track renewed in an intensive nine-week project. Most of the 21 tram stops were reconstructed with higher platforms to allow level access to the new low-floor trams. The overhead electrical supply was upgraded and some minor modifications were made to the type H trams and Glengowrie depot. Tram services were replaced with substitute bus services during this period. Services resumed on 8 August 2005. The terminus at Moseley Square was reconfigured in September 2005 as part of a general redevelopment of the square.

==== Extension to City West ====
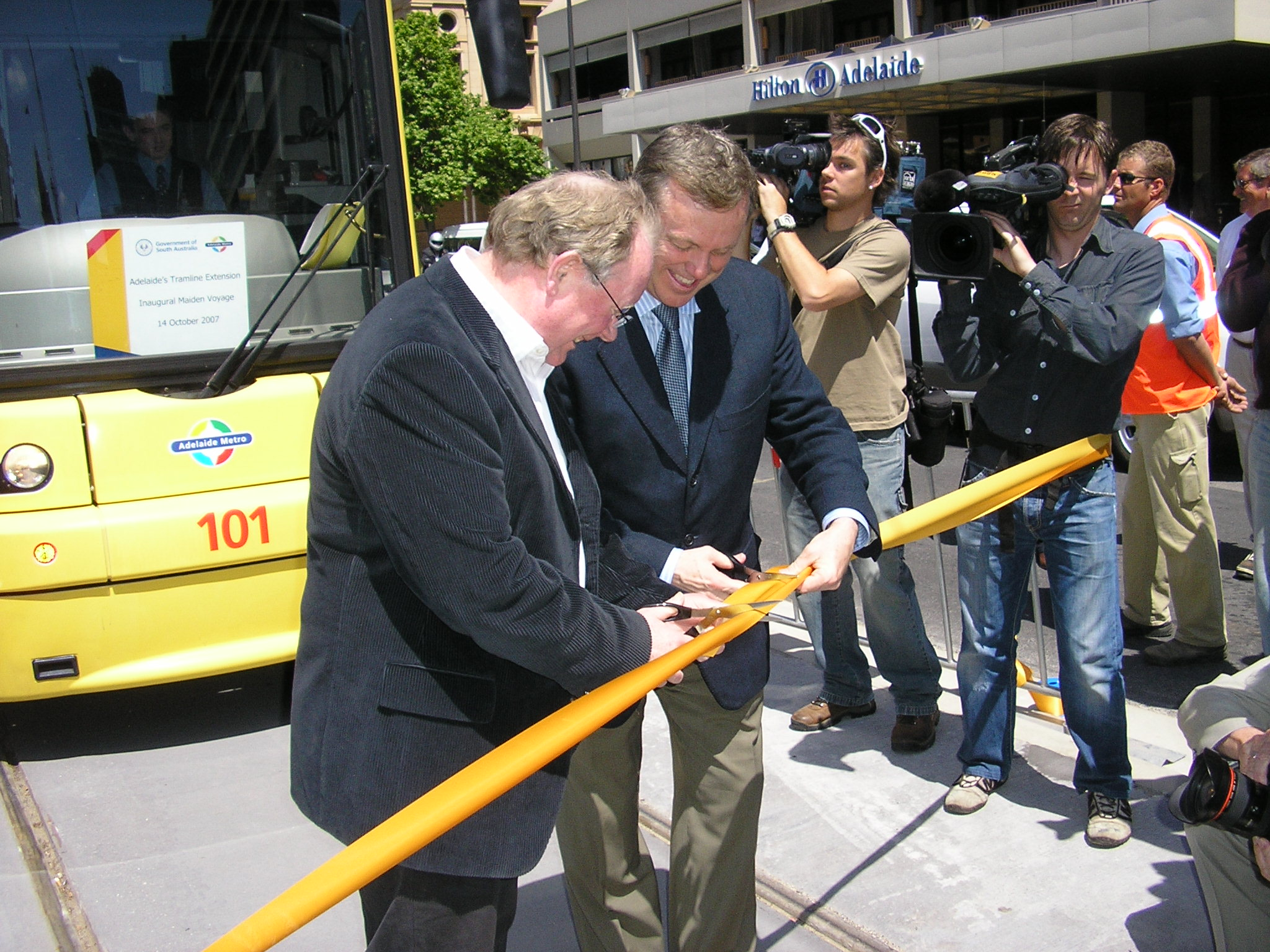
Minister for Transport Patrick Conlon & Premier Mike Rann open the City West Extension on 14 October 2007

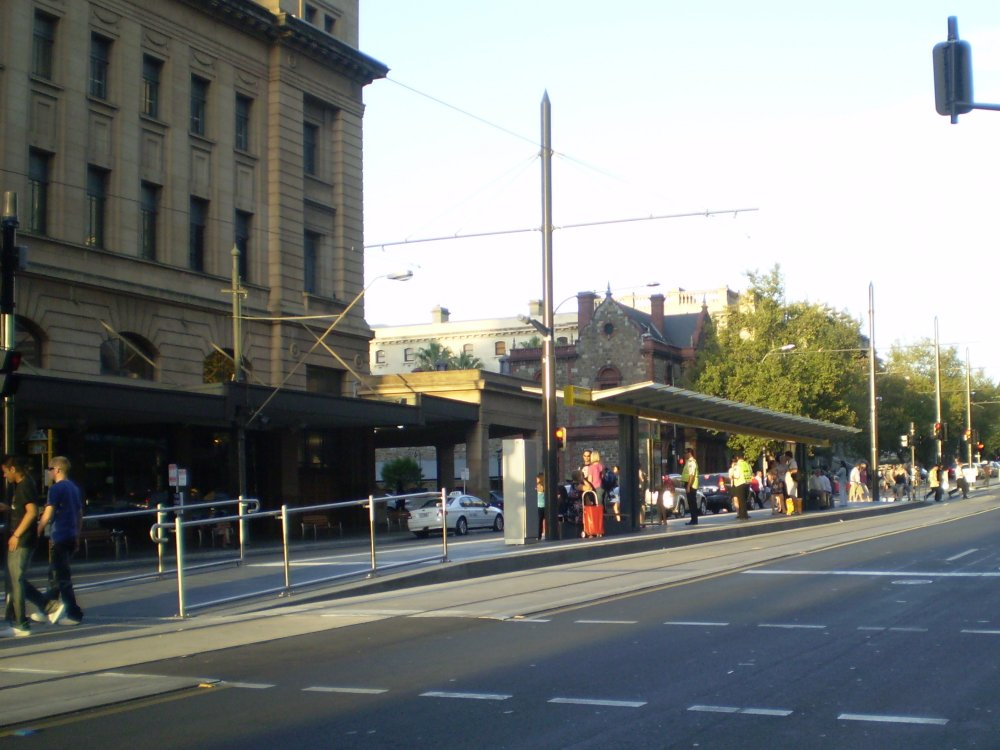
Adelaide railway station tram stop is typical of stops on the city centre extension

The South Australian Government announced a 1.2 kilometre extension from Victoria Square along King William Street to Adelaide railway station and the western city campus of the University of South Australia in April 2005.

In 2006, TransAdelaide began to replace the Type H cars with 11 Flexity Classic trams built in Bautzen, Germany by Bombardier Transportation. The first of the new cars was delivered to the Glengowrie depot in November 2005 and entered revenue service on 9 January 2006. A further order of four in 2008 brought the total to 15, numbered 101–115.

Construction work on the extension commenced in early 2007. A new Victoria Square stop opened on 6 August 2007. The stop moved from the centre of the square to the western side. Testing of the extension began in September 2007.

The extension opened on 14 October 2007. Initially, a shuttle service running between Victoria Square and City West tram stop was provided. Normal services continued to run between Victoria Square and Glenelg. A new timetable began on 15 October 2007 with through services from Glenelg to City West and a free shuttle service between South Terrace and City West.

==== South Road overpass ====
An overpass crossing South Road was announced in the 2007 South Australian Budget. The project was built in conjunction with the Anzac Highway Underpass. Construction by McConnell Dowell commenced in July 2009. On 8 December 2009, the overpass opened to allow trams to pass over it, however the South Road tram stop was not operational until 15 March 2010.

==== Extension to Adelaide Entertainment Centre ====
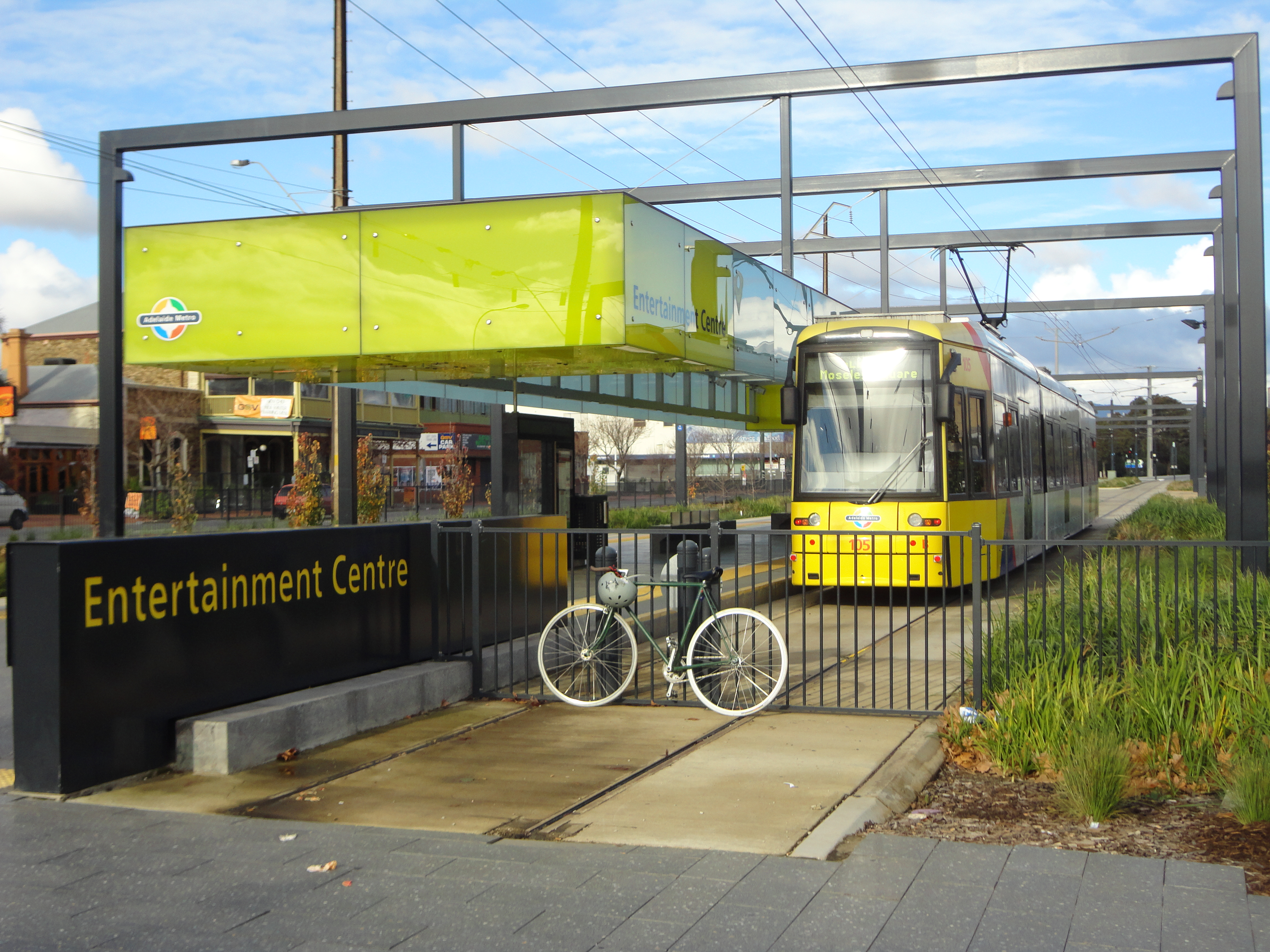
The Adelaide Entertainment Centre stop

A$100 million extension to the Adelaide Entertainment Centre was announced in the 2008 South Australian Budget. Planning commenced soon after and the state cabinet approved the extension in November 2008.

In 2009, six surplus Citadis 302 trams were purchased from Metro Ligero.

Construction work began on 11 May 2009. Testing began in February 2010 and the extension opened on 22 March 2010.

==== Extension to East End ====
After a lobbying campaign from businesses and institutions located in the area, a $50 million project to construct a one-kilometre branch along the eastern section of North Terrace was announced in the 2016 South Australian Budget. The extension enabled the creation of shuttle service between the old Royal Adelaide Hospital and the Adelaide Entertainment Centre. Services operate every ten minutes. An expansion of the project was also announced in December 2016. This saw a 100-metre northern spur line constructed from North Terrace on King William Road. The intention was to avoid modifying the North Terrace-King William Road intersection twice - once for the East End extension, then again if future northernbound expansion goes ahead - by combining all the work into a single program. Three new trams were ordered. The changes resulted in an extra $20 million being added to the budget for the project.

The eastern branch includes three new stops on North Terrace to service the South Australian Museum, University of Adelaide and Ayers House, while the northern branch will include a single stop on King William Road to service Elder Park and the Riverbank precinct.

A tender to design and construct the project was called in December 2016. Preliminary works commenced in July 2017, with major works commencing in October, and are expected to be completed by early 2018. In August 2017, it was revealed that the planned rail junction at the North Terrace-King William Road intersection would be altered, disallowing trams to turn left onto King William Road from North Terrace. Further controversy arose in late 2017 when it was revealed that trams would also not be able to turn right onto North Terrace from King William Street, disallowing future services from Glenelg to continue directly to East End and beyond.

In 2017, three surplus Citadis 302 trams were purchased from Metro Ligero.

Originally expected to be completed in early 2018, electrical faults pushed the opening date back to July 2018, while signalling faults uncovered during testing weeks before the scheduled opening date of 29 July further delayed the project. In addition, the company responsible for construction entered voluntary administration in August 2018.

The extension was opened on 13 October 2018, with services running Glenelg to Royal Adelaide Hospital, with limited peak services continuing to Entertainment Centre, and Entertainment Centre to Botanic Gardens. A route running from Glenelg to Festival Plaza runs only on weekends and Adelaide Oval event days.

==== Tram Grade Separation Projects ====
In July 2024, it was announced that Glenelg tram services would be temporarily suspended between Glenelg and South Terrace for 6 months in 2025 to remove the level crossings at Morphett Road, Cross Road, and Marion Road, as well as upgrading the South Road overpass to support construction of the North-South Motorway. For the duration of the closure, the turnback and main tracks in the Park Lands between South Terrace and Greenhill Road were repurposed into a temporary stabling facility, allowing services in the CBD to continue operating without access to the main depot at Glengowrie.

The Glenelg tram line was closed beyond South Terrace on 2 August 2025 and reopened on 26 January 2026; the South Road tram stop remained closed for construction until reopening on 1 March.

== Routes ==
On 13 October 2018, following the opening of the Botanic Gardens and Festival Plaza extensions, the network timetable was restructured and new routes opened to service the new stops. The primary route from Glenelg was curtailed to terminate at the Royal Adelaide Hospital, and two additional routes were introduced to leave three routes in total:

- Glenelg to Royal Adelaide Hospital: typical 10-minute frequency, additional peak services continue to Entertainment Centre giving 5-minute frequency on the rest of the line
- Glenelg to Festival Plaza: operates only on weekends and Adelaide Oval event days, typical 20-minute frequency
- Botanic Gardens to Entertainment Centre: typical 10-minute frequency

Since 2019, the seasonal ADLOOP tram operates in the CBD between mid-February and mid-March, increasing access to the Adelaide Fringe and Adelaide Festival during "Mad March". The loop runs along King William Street and the eastern end of North Terrace on Friday and Saturday nights alongside the existing timetable, making use of turns at the King William Street/North Terrace junction not used in regular services. The ADLOOP tram did not run for the 2026 season.

Glenelg to Royal Adelaide Hospital
- Entertainment Centre (peak service only)
- Bonython Park (peak service only)
- Thebarton (peak service only)
- Royal Adelaide Hospital
- City West
- Adelaide Railway Station
- Rundle Mall
- Pirie Street
- Victoria Square
- City South
- South Terrace
- Greenhill Road
- Wayville
- Goodwood Road
- Forestville
- Black Forest
- South Road
- Glandore
- Beckman Street
- South Plympton
- Marion Road
- Plympton Park
- Morphettville
- Glengowrie
- Glenelg East
- Brighton Road
- Jetty Road
- Moseley Square

Botanic Gardens to Entertainment Centre
- Entertainment Centre
- Bonython Park
- Thebarton
- Royal Adelaide Hospital
- City West
- Adelaide Railway Station
- Art Gallery
- University
- Botanic Gardens

Glenelg to Festival Plaza
(weekends and event days only)
- Festival Plaza
- Rundle Mall
- Pirie Street
- Victoria Square
- City South
- South Terrace
- Greenhill Road
- Wayville
- Goodwood Road
- Forestville
- Black Forest
- South Road
- Glandore
- Beckman Street
- South Plympton
- Marion Road
- Plympton Park
- Morphettville
- Glengowrie
- Glenelg East
- Brighton Road
- Jetty Road
- Moseley Square

ADLOOP
(seasonal)
- Botanic Gardens
- University
- Art Gallery
- Festival Plaza (South Terrace to Botanic Gardens only)
- Rundle Mall
- Pirie Street
- Victoria Square
- City South
- South Terrace

== Controversy ==
Due to the increased popularity of the service beyond the city after the City West extension, the trams service dramatically exceeded its capacity, with over 100,000 extra trips for the three months from November 2007, compared the same period the previous year. This resulted in intensive overcrowding on board the trams, and many passengers were unable to board trams during peak hours. The extension of the tramway along King William Street and North Terrace was blamed by critics for increased congestion within the centre of Adelaide, but no actual evidence of this occurring was identified.

There have been a small number of minor derailments along the tramway, including one on Melbourne Cup Day, 6 November 2007. On several occasions, some Flexity trams experienced breakdown problems.
