= H. Dalton Hall =

South Australian artist

Harold Dalton Hall (29 October 1881 – 1 August 1946) was a South Australian amateur artist noted for marine subjects. A lasting example of his work is the model cast in bronze of HMS Buffalo atop the Centenary memorial, Moseley Square, Glenelg, in South Australia. He was referred to as "Dalton–Hall" in his death notices, but rarely elsewhere; he signed his paintings "H. D. Hall".

== History ==
Hall was born in Semaphore, South Australia, second surviving son of clerk Charles James Hall and his wife Susannah Maria Hall, née Dalton (died 11 July 1909), who married in 1872. They had thirteen or fourteen children, but around half died young. Hall's father was proved insolvent in 1892 and died before 1909, but further details are yet to emerge. Sylvia was related to the English parliamentarian Hugh Dalton, and his father Rev. John Neale Dalton, Canon of Windsor and Domestic Chaplain to the King. Her father was Adelaide chemist Charles Dalton, for many years with F. H. Faulding.

Hall grew up in Queenstown, South Australia By 1894 he was working on the South Australian Navy ship Protector as a cabin boy. He joined the Royal Navy, and did the gunnery course at HMS Excellent and was trained on torpedoes at HMS Vernon, both shore establishments. He underwent further training aboard HMS Victory, which from 1889 to 1904 served as a base for the Naval School of Telegraphy. This was prior to practical wireless telegraphy, semaphore and Morse code using signal lamps being then the principal means of ship-to-ship and ship-to-shore communication. He served on repairing ship HMS Assistance, where he was in charge, with two other people, of the dynamos. He was in charge of torpedoes on HMS Powerful under Capt. Dudley North, and it was from this ship that he took his discharge.

He retired from the Navy around 1909 after twelve years of service, and returned to Adelaide. He took lessons in painting from James Ashton, and 1918–1920 was an active member of "The Art Club", whose members included Ierne Acraman, Olive Atkinson, Ethel Barringer, D'A. Boxall, Albert Collins, May Grigg, Ruby Henty, L. H. Howie, Marie Tuck and Maud Wynes, but was largely self-taught. He had a senior position with the GPO (predecessor of the PMG) as electrician in charge of the Glenelg telephone exchange, and painted mostly on weekends.

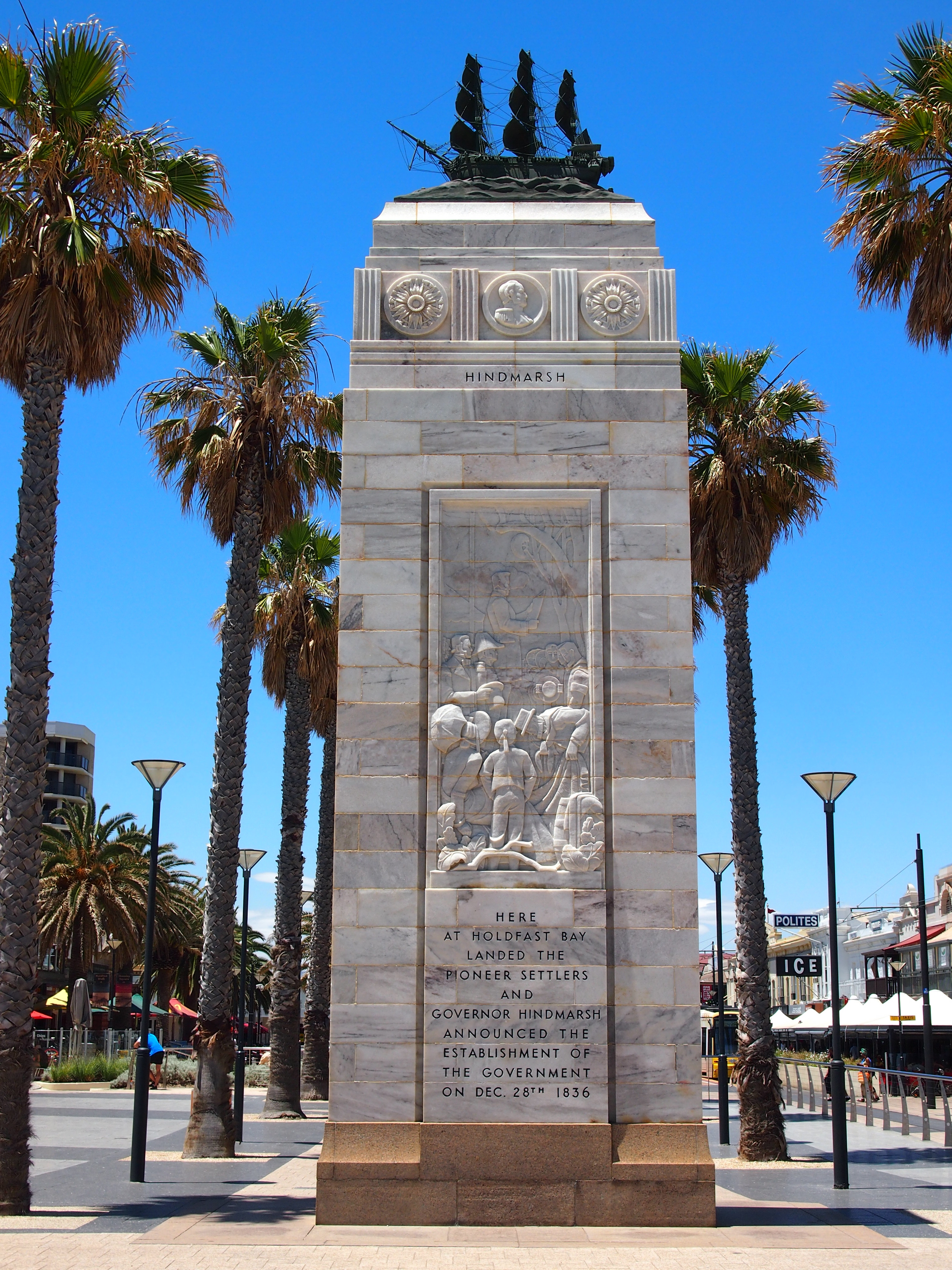
Centenary monument, west face

He painted, in oils and other media, ships from the original Australian colonies' navies to more modern vessels. Examples of his work were in the collections of the Prince of Wales, Lord Jellicoe, Admiral Sir Lionel Halsey; others were on sale to the public through an art dealer. One large oil painting, of the 1st AIF convoy 1914, hung in the RSL clubhouse, Glenelg.

He constructed a large detailed model of HMS Victory which employed almost a mile of twine for the cordage, 200 blocks and 500 eye splices; it was a feature of the naval procession held in Adelaide on 25 October 1918. In 1916 he made another model of HMS Victory, which was purchased by the firm of W.D. & H.O. Wills to present to the Navy League, and was exhibited at Royal Naval House in Sydney.

In 1936, as part of the Centenary of South Australia celebrations, Hall conducted a Buffalo model boat building competition open to adults and children. He gave a great deal of assistance to competitors, in an effort to secure serious effort on their part. His own contribution, floating on the sea near the Patawalonga River, is illustrated here. He had earlier built the wooden pattern from which the bronze Buffalo for the monument was cast.

In 1943 Hall was transferred to the GPO telephone workshops at Sydenham, New South Wales. He died in hospital at Liverpool, New South Wales on 1 August 1946, and was buried 3 August in Rookwood Cemetery. Vernon died at Gloucester House on 31 August 1955. Sylvia was at the Rockdale address in 1951, and resided there until her death in hospital on 2 August 1968.

== Recognition ==
Hall was awarded a gold medal by the Glenelg Council for his contribution to the Australia Day procession of 26 July 1918.

== Family ==
Siblings who survived to adulthood were Caroline Elizabeth Hall (1873–1953) married Howsin Spafford in 1913; Gerald Percy "Perce" Hall (1878–1967), Rupert Charles Hall (1884–1938), Violet May "Lettie" (1888–1969) and Dora Gertrude Hall (1890–1950).

Harold Dalton Hall married Sylvia Muriel Rubena Schrader (1891–2 August 1968) on 22 February 1914. They had one son, Vernon Dalton Hall (12 September 1916 – 31 August 1955), and lived at Second Avenue, Helmsdale (now Glenelg East) until his transfer to Sydney, then had a house at 33 Bryant Street, Rockdale, New South Wales. Vernon was a prominent member of the Cessnock Photographic Society, interested in technical aspects of the craft. He instigated a novel competition amongst members for best photo taken with a Kodak "Box Brownie" camera, purchased by the Club.
