= F. J. Botting =

Francis Joseph Botting (1819 – 10 July 1906), generally known as F. J. Botting was an auctioneer in Adelaide, South Australia, who became an owner of several important hotels and breweries. His son, Frank South Botting (c. 1849 – 12 November 1894), was a partner.

== History ==
Francis Joseph Botting was born in London and trained as a builder. He emigrated to South Australia aboard Buckinghamshire arriving in March 1839. He joined with his brother Frederick Henry Botting (c. 1810 – 1873) in constructing some of Adelaide's earliest buildings, including a merchant's office and warehouse, which later became the Blenheim Hotel, and the first wharf and wharf building in Port Adelaide, under architect Prescott. The two brothers lived on the islands of Spencer's Gulf 1844–1846 during the financial slump.

=== Auctioneer ===
In May 1856 Botting joined Wicksteed, Townsend & Co., auctioneers, (John Bentham Neales, Frederic Wicksteed and William Townsend), which became Wicksteed, Botting, Townsend & Co., then Townsend, Wicksteed & Kay with just those two and William Kay. Kay dropped out of the partnership in 1869, then the firm of Townsend, Botting & Co. was dissolved in August 1880, and all assets liquidated; Botting continuing with the business with the assistance of his son-in-law G. E. C. Stevens.

=== Brewers and hotel owners ===
In 1874 Frank Botting and Frederick Estcourt Bucknall purchased the brewing and hotel-owning firm of Haussen & Co. from Henry Haussen's widow, retaining the name Haussen & Co. Bucknall lost most of his fortune with the failure of the Commercial Bank of South Australia in 1886, and Botting and his father took over the business. Frank Botting died in November 1894, and his father became sole proprietor. At some stage the Bottings acquired the Pier Hotel, Glenelg and the Family Hotel, Glenelg.

=== Other interests ===
- He was an early member of the Walkerville Cricket Club, as was one C. Botting, of whom no details have been found.
- He was a founding directors the Adelaide and Suburban Building Society, which became the Permanent Equitable Building Society.
- He served as Government Auctioneer and Valuator, negotiating the purchase of land for the Port Augusta, Government Gums, Bordertown, Goolwa, and Gladstone railway lines.

== Death ==
Botting died at his home on Kensington Terrace, Kensington. His remains were interred at the West Terrace Cemetery.

== Family ==
Francis Joseph Botting (1819 – 10 July 1906) married Delia Sophia South (c. 1924 – 21 December 1894) in 1846. She also arrived aboard Buckinghamshire with her sisters Mary Ann South, Sarah Elizabeth South (both died shortly after arrival) and brother Henry James South and Parents Thomas South with his wife Dorothy. They had a home on Kensington Terrace, Kensington.

- Frank South Botting (1849 – 12 November 1894) married Eliza Letchford on 20 November 1873. He was educated at Webster's Adelaide Commercial School on Grenfell Street and joined his father's auctioneer business.
- Frances Jane Botting (1853 – 24 May 1920) married John Thomas Lunn on 17 March 1875. She married again on 20 June 1908 to John Drummond. Daughter Frances Marion Lunn died 1907.
- Alice Isabel Botting (23 October 1858 – 1928) married George Edward Carlisle Stevens (died 20 September 1907) on 27 November 1879. Stevens was a partner in Botting's auction business, then its owner. They had six children.

His brother Frederick Henry Botting (c. 1810 – 31 January 1873), whose first wife died shortly after arrival, married Jane Stephens (c. 1823 – 2 October 1893) in 1846. Jane arrived in South Australia aboard John Renwick in 1837. They had one son:

- Frederick William Botting (c. 1846 – 9 April 1921) married Jane Wheatley on 6 August 1870. They had four daughters and seven sons, lived Dulwich Avenue, Dulwich. He was a printer, briefly in partnership as Waddy, Botting & Co., printers and publishers (dissolved March 1870), and subsequently a clerk in the Land Office.
