= Moseley Square, Glenelg =

Public square in Adelaide, Australia

Coordinates: 34.9803°S 138.5118°E

Moseley Square is a public square in the City of Holdfast Bay at Glenelg, and was named for Henry J. Moseley, the builder and first publican of the Pier Hotel, Glenelg. Located between Jetty Road and Glenelg Beach, the Square is the location of the Glenelg Town Hall, Glenelg Jetty, the Stamford Grand Hotel and various fast-food outlets. It is the terminus of the Glenelg tram line (for many years the only tram line in Adelaide) from Adelaide. It is a site of major events including the Glenelg Jazz Festival and the City to Bay Fun Run.

== Centenary monument ==
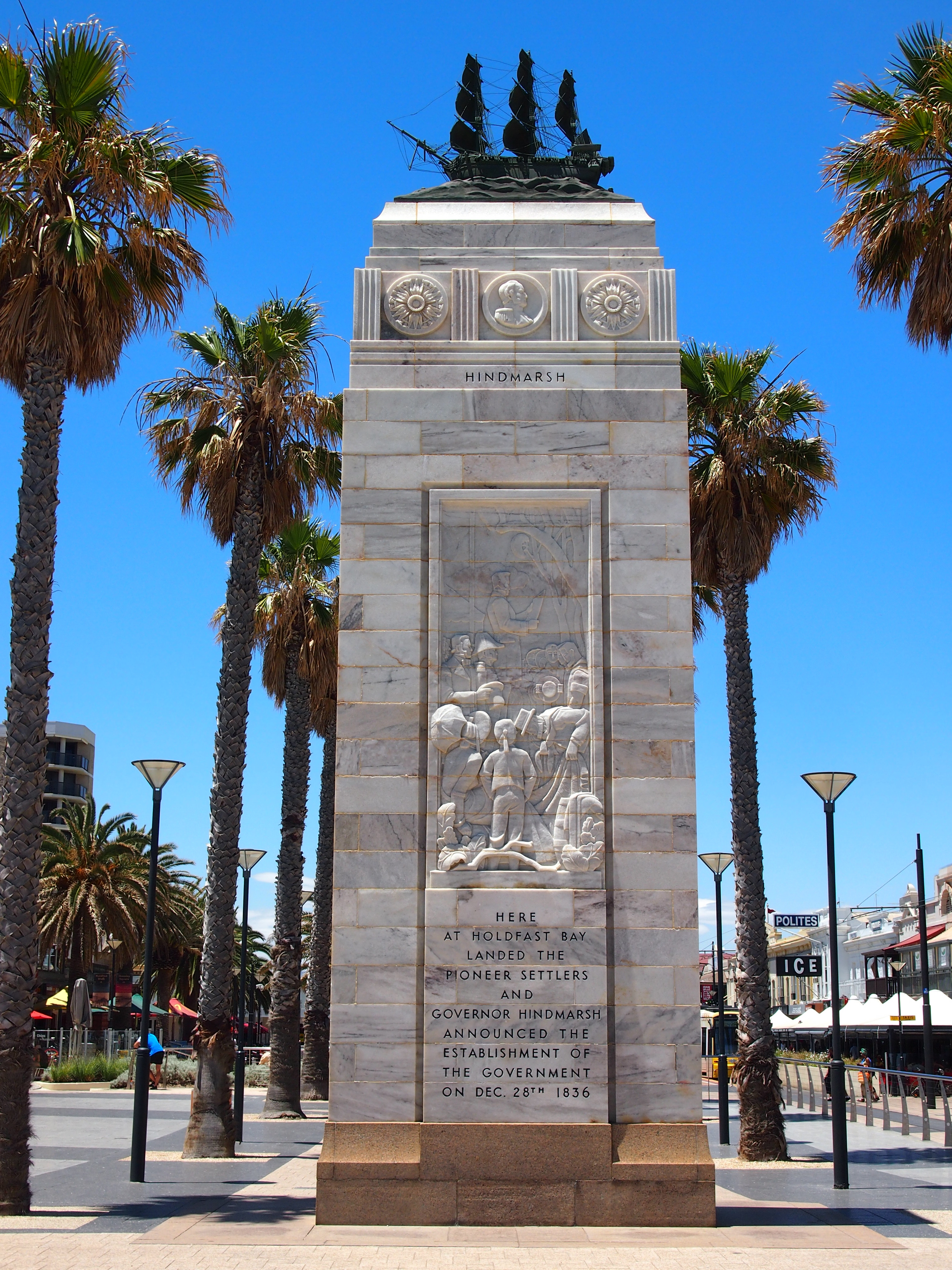
Centenary monument, west face

On 28 December 1936 an 11 metres (36 ft) obelisk, erected to commemorate the landing of British pioneer settlers 100 years, earlier was unveiled at Moseley Square. The memorial, also known as the Pioneers' Memorial, was designed by architect Gordon Beaumont Smith and shaped by Adelaide monumental mason A. S. Tillett from South Australian marble, placed on a base of Victor Harbor granite. It was topped by a 2.4 metres (7.9 ft) bronze model of HMS Buffalo modelled by H. Dalton Hall. In the frieze at the top of its four faces were carved roundels containing bas-relief portraits of Governor Hindmarsh, Robert Gouger, Edward Gibbon Wakefield, and George Fife Angas. On the east and west faces were carved representations of the foundation and proclamation of the colony, from sketches by Ivor Hele and modelled in plaster by J. H. Choate of the School of Arts.

Bronze tablets on the northern and southern sides carry tributes to Wakefield, Gouger, Torrens, Angas, Nuyts, Flinders, Baudin, Sturt, Barker, and Light, and "the first settlers, men and women, who by faith and courage endured the hardships of pioneer settlement to lay the foundations of South Australia. Si monumentum requiris circumspice". — For [their] monument, look around you. — (as per Christopher Wren's epitaph in St Paul's Cathedral, London).

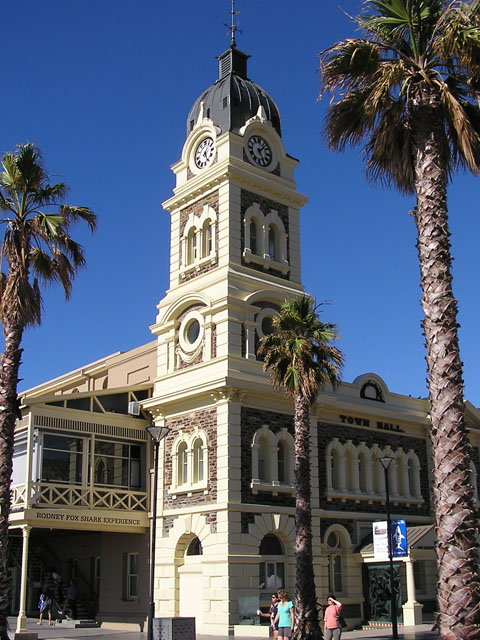
The Glenelg Town Hall on Moseley Square.

== Stamford Grand Hotel ==
The Stamford Grand Hotel occupies a site previously occupied by the Pier Hotel, constructed in 1856.

== 1995 International Tattoo ==
Moseley Square was the venue for what was styled "Sensational Adelaide International Tattoo" between 23 November and 3 December 1995, starting at sunset. The event had the Centenary monument as a backdrop and the audience of around 3,000 was seated grandstand-fashion on three sides. Inspired by the Edinburgh Tattoo, it featured bands from the Royal Scots Dragoon Guards, Brigade of Gurkhas, Royal Australian Navy and South Australian Police Force, plus demonstrations from a quartet of flag wavers from Umbria and a composition "Celtic Dreaming" for didgeridoo, bodhrán and bagpipe. A VHS recording of highlights from the concerts was produced and marketed by the ABC.

The Square has undergone some refurbishment during the 2000s.

== Tram stop ==
Moseley Square is also the location of the final stop on the Glenelg tram line.

Preceding station	Adelaide Metro	Following station
Jetty Road towards Royal Adelaide Hospital, Adelaide Entertainment Centre or Festival Plaza	Glenelg tram line	Terminus
