= Glenelg, South Australia =

Glenelg
- Suburb
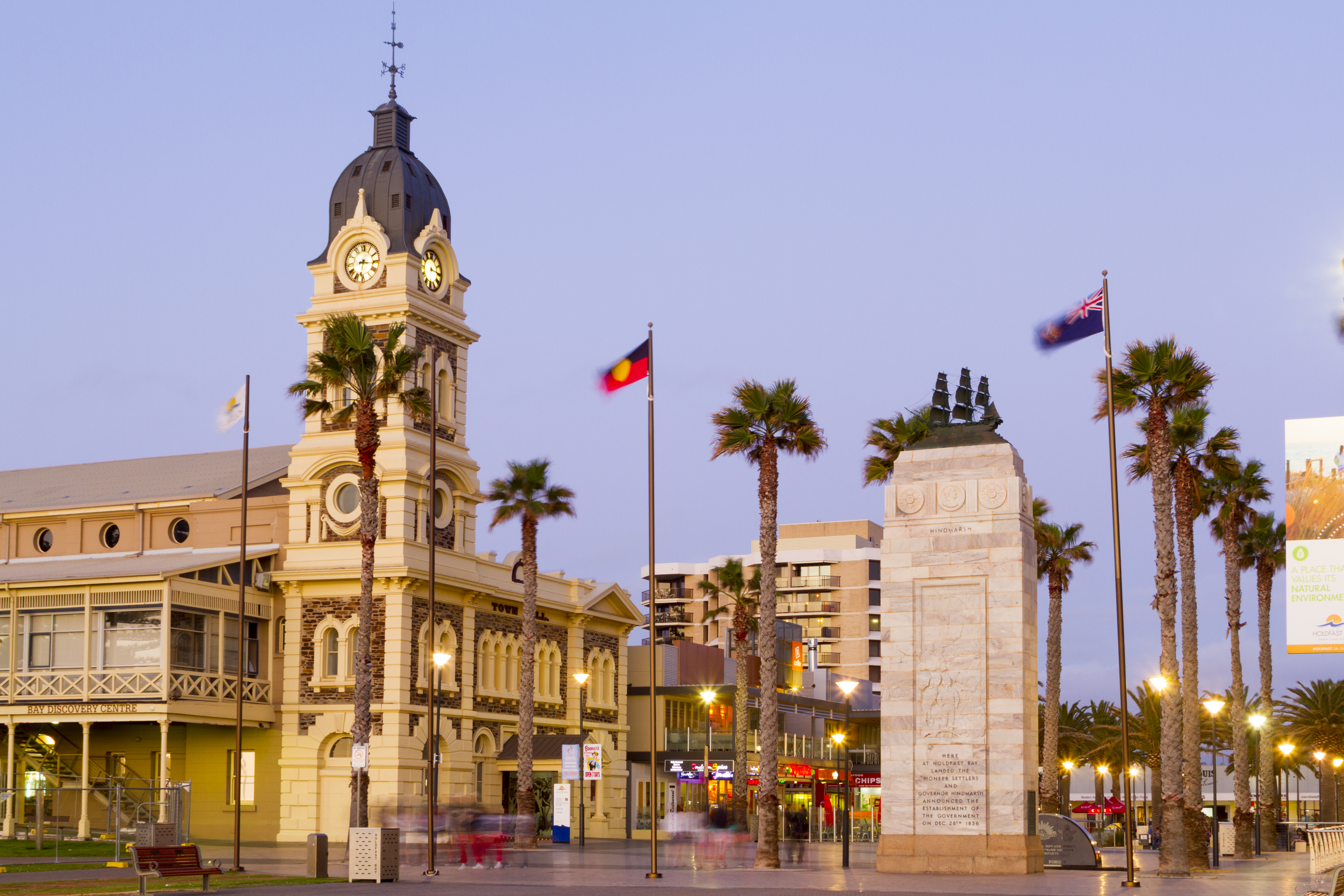
- Glenelg Town Hall and Moseley Square

- Interactive map of Glenelg
- Country: Australia
- State: South Australia
- City: Adelaide
- LGA: City of Holdfast Bay
- Location: 9 km (5.6 mi) from Adelaide CBD; 15 km (9.3 mi) from Port Adelaide; 5 km (3.1 mi) from Adelaide Airport
- Established: 1836

Government
  - State electorate: Morphett
  - Federal division: Boothby

Area
  - Total: 0.88 km^{2} (0.34 sq mi)

Population
  - Total: 3,440 (SAL 2021)
- Postcode: 5045
Suburbs around Glenelg
| | Glenelg North | Glenelg North |
| Gulf St Vincent | Glenelg | Glenelg East |
| | Glenelg South | Glenelg East |

Glenelg is a beach-side suburb of the South Australian capital of Adelaide. Located on the shore of Holdfast Bay in Gulf St Vincent, it has become a tourist destination due to its beach and many attractions, home to several hotels and dozens of restaurants.

Established in 1836, it is the oldest European settlement on mainland South Australia. It was named after Lord Glenelg, a member of British Cabinet and Secretary of State for War and the Colonies. Through Lord Glenelg the name derives from Glenelg, Highland, Scotland.

== History ==
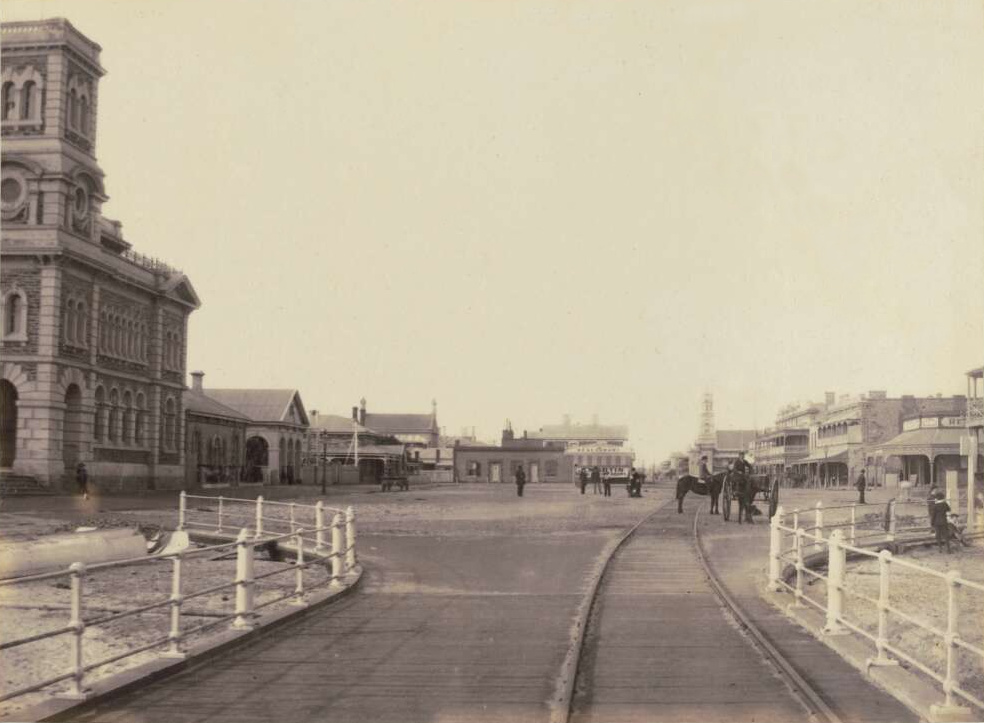
Glenelg from the Jetty around 1869

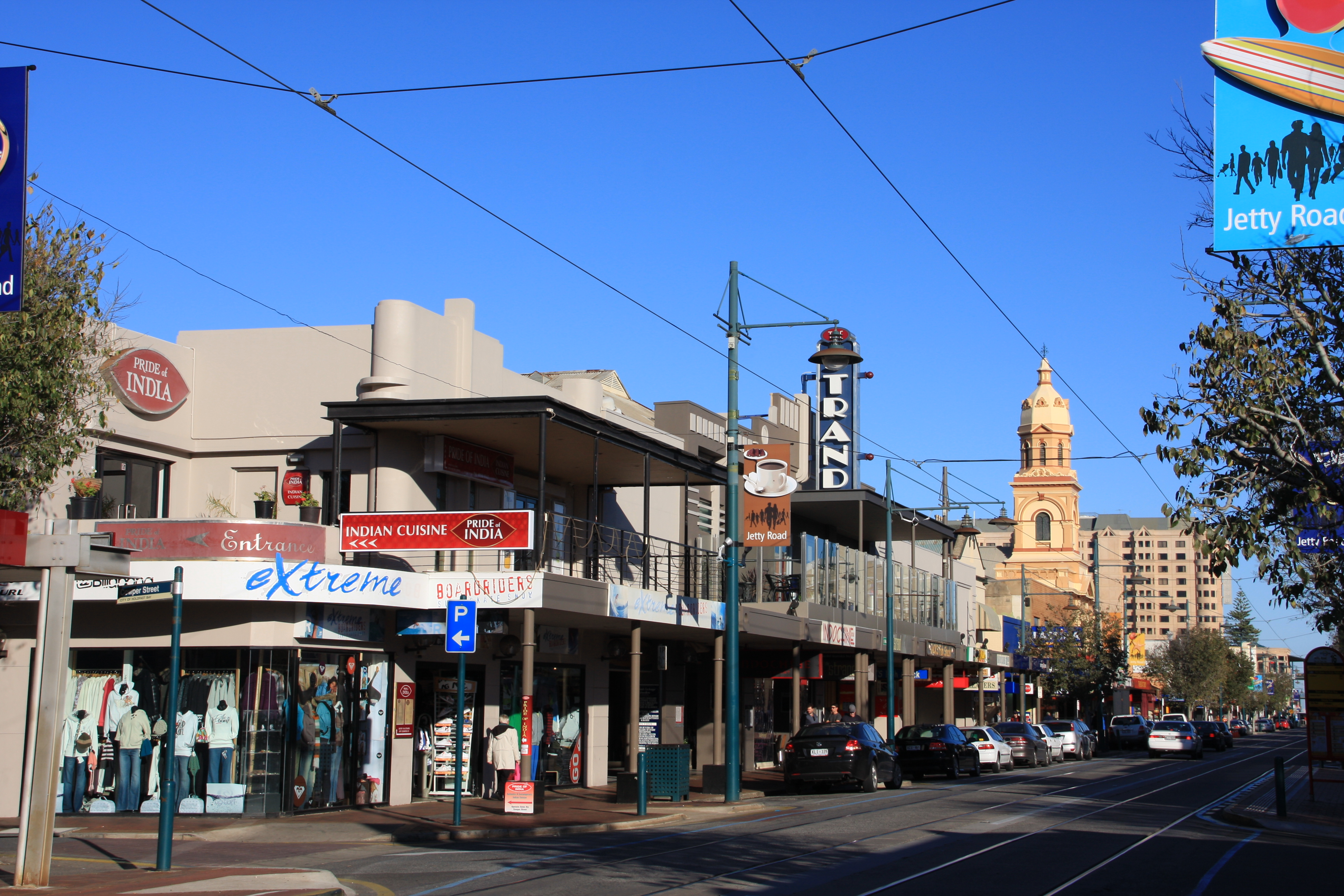
Jetty Road

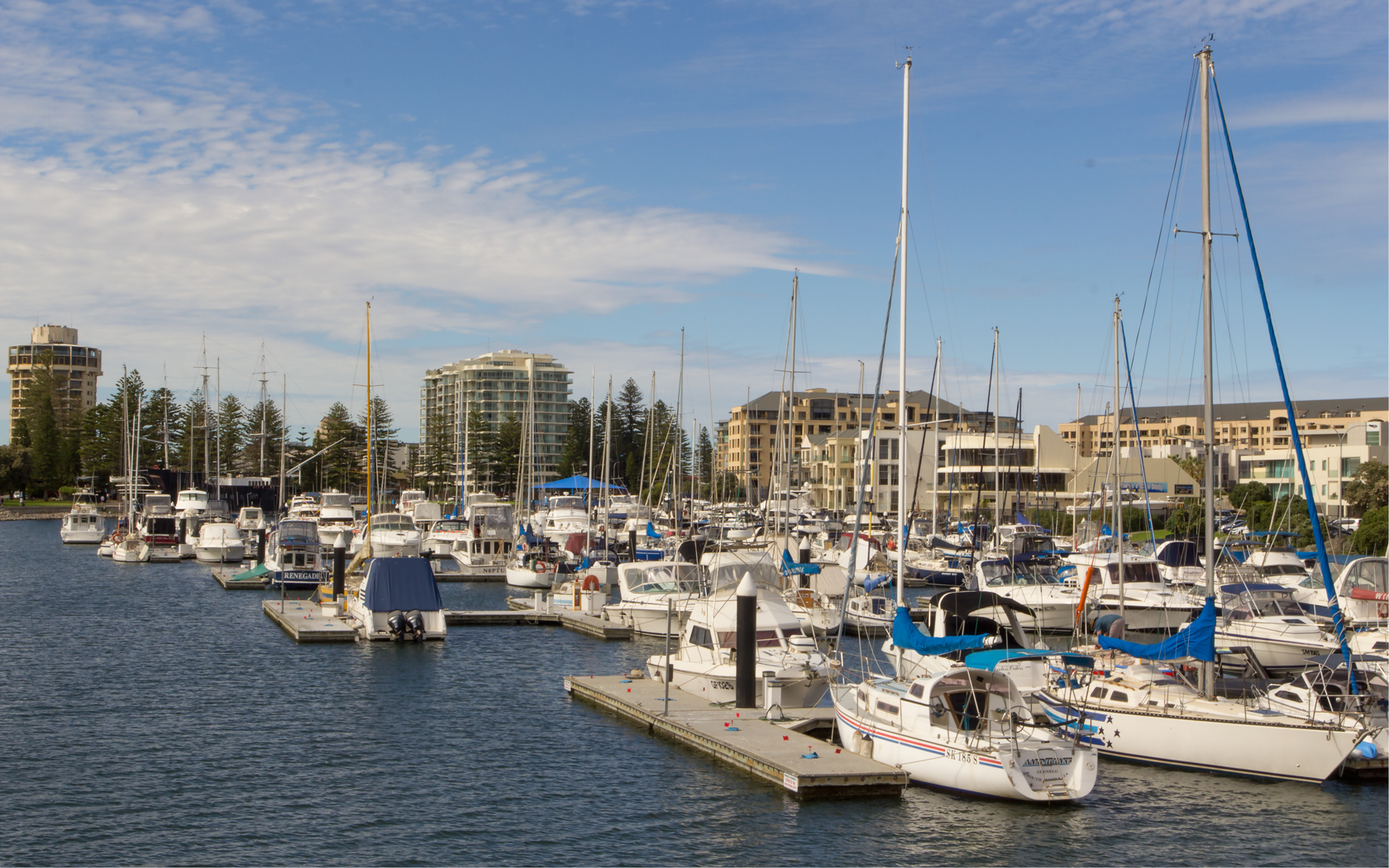
The Glenelg Marina taken from the Michael Herbert Bridge

Prior to the 1836 British colonisation of South Australia, Glenelg and the rest of the Adelaide Plains was home to the Kaurna group of Aboriginal Australians. They knew the area as "Pattawilya" and the local river as "Pattawilyangga", now named the Patawalonga River.

Prior to European settlement huge oyster reefs of Australian flat oysters (Ostrea angasi, also known as the Southern mud oyster) existed off the coast of Glenelg. Oysters were of huge importance as a food source for Indigenous Australians at many locations around Australia, but the extensive reefs were decimated after colonisation; it is estimated that in South Australia alone, at least 1,500 kilometres (930 mi) of coastal reefs were destroyed by the 21st century. Oyster fishing was practised by the early settlers, and much of the damage was caused by using dredging to collect the oysters, which led to the reefs being damaged.

=== Settlement ===
The first British settlers set sail for South Australia in 1836. Several locations for the settlement were considered, including Kangaroo Island, Port Lincoln and Encounter Bay. The Adelaide plains were chosen by Colonel William Light, and Governor John Hindmarsh proclaimed the province of South Australia at the site of The Old Gum Tree in Glenelg North on 28 December 1836.

The first post office in Glenelg opened on 5 December 1849; the first postmaster was John McDonald of the St Leonard's Inn. A telegraph office was opened in September 1859 and the two offices amalgamated in 1868. The present post office building on Moseley Square was built in 1912.

The sale of the surveyed lots that constitute the Town of Glenelg was remarkable: the right to purchase, at £1 per "town acre", was allocated by means of a ballot held in February 1839. The "winner" was a syndicate of six led by William Finke, with Osmond Gilles, his nephew John Jackson Oakden and H. R. Wigley (father of W. R. Wigley) notable members.

Among the town's earliest public buildings were the Independent (Congregational) church, opened 7 March 1848, St Peter's (Anglican) church, opened 28 March 1852 and the Pier Hotel, opened Christmas Day 1856, all the work of Henry J. Moseley, for whom Moseley Street and Moseley Square were named. No trace of the original structures remains.

The Corporate Town of Glenelg was proclaimed in 1855, separating local governance of the township of Glenelg from that of the West Torrens and Brighton district councils. Construction of the Glenelg Institute, which is now the Glenelg Town Hall, started in December 1875. The institute opened in 1877, with lecture rooms, a concert hall and a library. The classical structure was designed by Edmund Wright, whose works include the Adelaide Town Hall and Adelaide General Post Office on King William Street. The hall sits on Moseley Square, just off the beach. The Holdfast Bay city council acquired the hall in 1887. Today it houses a museum, tourist information centre and restaurants.

=== Jetty ===
Construction of Glenelg's first jetty commenced in August 1857. It was opened on 25 April 1859. The structure was 381 metres (1,250 ft) long and cost over £31,000 to build. It served fishermen and maritime traders, including a mail service operated by P&O, until Port Adelaide replaced it as Adelaide's main port. Passengers were also able travel from the Glenelg jetty to Kangaroo Island by steamer.

Various additions to the jetty were made, none of which stand today. A lighthouse was built in 1872 at the jetty's end, but a year later it caught fire and was cast into the sea to save the rest of the structure. A replacement lighthouse was built in 1874, and was 12.1 metres (40 ft) tall. Other additions included public baths, an aquarium, a police shed and a three-story kiosk with tea rooms. The kiosk structure also housed a family.

The jetty kiosk was wrecked in a storm in 1943, and the jetty was severely damaged by a freak cyclone in 1948. Most of the structure washed away and the remaining structure was deemed unsafe. Just two weeks later, the local council began drafting plans for a new jetty and construction was completed in 1969. The new structure was just 215 metres (705 ft) long, less than two-thirds of the length of the original jetty. The second jetty continues to stand today, at the end of Jetty Road.

On 1 January 2016, two boys were drowned after falling into the water from rocks to north of the jetty.

=== The Glenelg Blocks ===
An ill-fated breakwater construction project was conceived in the early 1900s, intended to create an artificial harbour for the protection of yachts and the local fishing fleet. Parliamentary approval was granted in 1905. In 1909 and 1910, work was dogged by losses of machinery to rough seas and concrete piles that shattered when driven. Pile-driving for seabed study had some success in 1913. By mid-1916 the project remained incomplete and its future was uncertain. In 1918, the contractors took legal action against the Government seeking damages of £80,000. By 1919, the project had become an embarrassment and an "eye sore" without providing a safe harbour as originally intended. Today, the structures are heavily eroded and are colonised with marine life. The site is an artificial reef known to divers and snorkelers as "The Blocks" or "The Glenelg Blocks".

=== Amusement parks ===
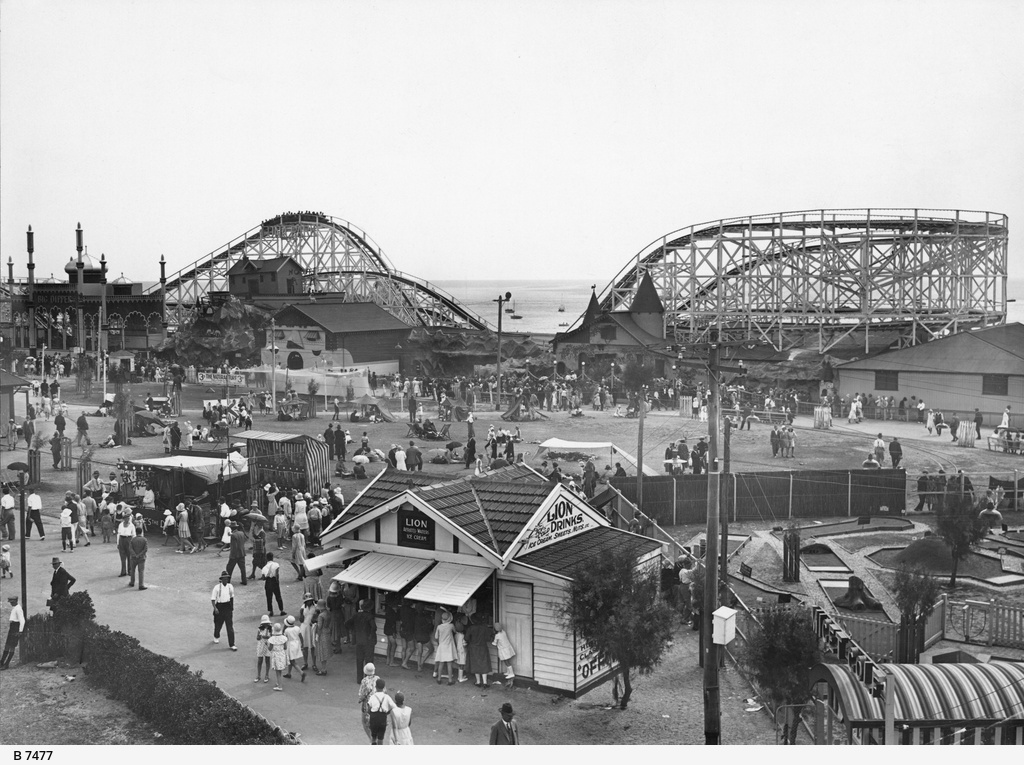
Colley Reserve and the newly opened (in 1930) Luna Park on the foreshore at Glenelg

Glenelg has been a popular spot for recreation and leisure for much of its history. Following the success of Luna Park, Melbourne, a similar amusement park was constructed on Glenelg's foreshore in 1930. Luna Park Glenelg was placed in voluntary liquidation in 1934, and all the rides (excluding a single carousel) were disassembled, purchased by the directors, and transported to Sydney, where they were used in the construction of Luna Park Sydney. The park's managers claimed that the reasons for the closure were the inability to make money from the park as it was, and opposition to changes from Council and residents, who were afraid that "undesirables" would be attracted to the area.

Built near the former Luna Park site was Magic Mountain, which first opened in 1982. It featured water slides, mini-golf, bumper boats, dodgem cars and many other amusements and was popular with many Adelaide residents. It was also extensively criticised, called an eyesore and likened to a "giant dog dropping" in the media; despite this it was very popular with young children and teenagers. As part of the Holdfast Shores development, Magic Mountain was finally demolished in 2004 and replaced with The Beachouse, a 5-storey modern centre with a more conservative design which still incorporates the historic carousel; it opened in mid-2006. Since its opening, The Beachouse has been a widely popular attraction of the Glenelg area, appealing to both adults and children. A 25-metre single-arm Ferris wheel was a prominent feature of the area until its closure.

=== Wastewater treatment plant ===
South Australia's second largest wastewater treatment plants is located in Glenelg. It was first established in 1933, and was upgraded in 1945, 1962, 1973 and most recently in 2002. A pipeline pumps 2.8 gigalitres of treated wastewater to Adelaide where it is used to irrigate green spaces, such as parks and ovals. The facility also conducts tours for school groups and visitors to learn about water supply and treatment. The plant also returns treated wastewater to the ocean. The most significant pollutants discharged to the sea (by mass) in 2018/19 were: nitrogen (180 tonnes), phosphorus (78 tonnes), chlorine (32 tonnes), ammonia (14 tonnes), fluoride (14 tonnes) and zinc (1 tonne).

=== High-rise development ===
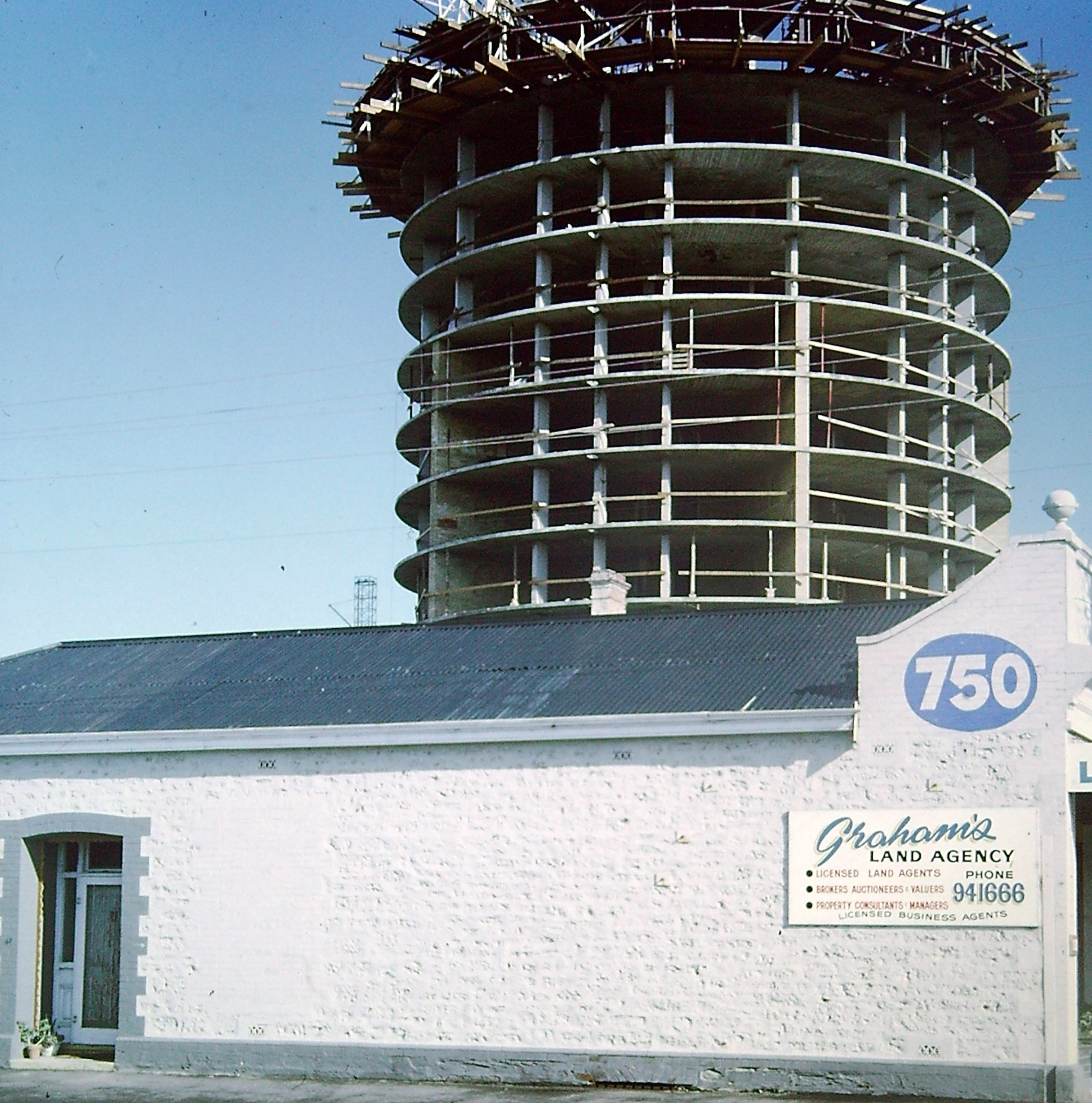
Atlantic Tower During Development, circa mid-1970s

Atlantic Tower was built in the late 1970s and was Adelaide's tallest residential building at the time. The fourteen-story tower featured a revolving restaurant on its top floor, and was part of a larger development plan that never eventuated. Many other high-rise buildings exist in Glenelg, including the fifteen-story Stamford Grand hotel on Moseley Square, built in 1990, and the twelve-story Liberty Towers, built in 2004.

The Holdfast Shores development, starting in the late 1990s, included the construction of the Marina Pier apartment building with its own private marina in Glenelg North, and the Pier Hotel, founded 2001, and unrelated to the historic Pier Hotel on Moseley Square. The development was met with strong opposition, from both local residents and the City of Holdfast Bay, fearing overdevelopment would ruin the area. Parts of the plan were scaled back, with the Platinum Apartment building scaled down from fifteen stories to nine, and the cinema complex cancelled.

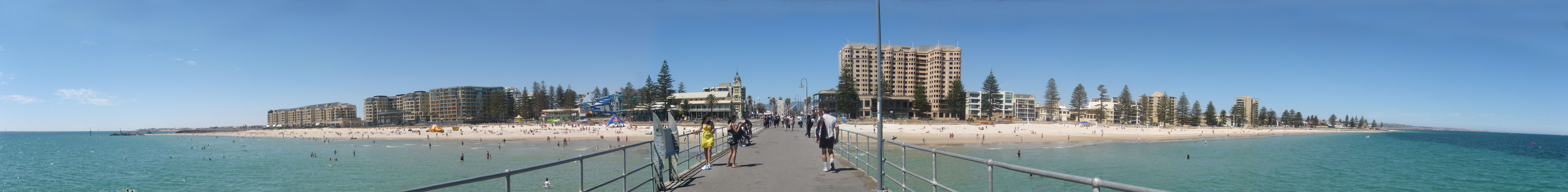
180-degree panoramic view of the Glenelg foreshore taken from mid–way along the jetty, showing some of the high–rise development.
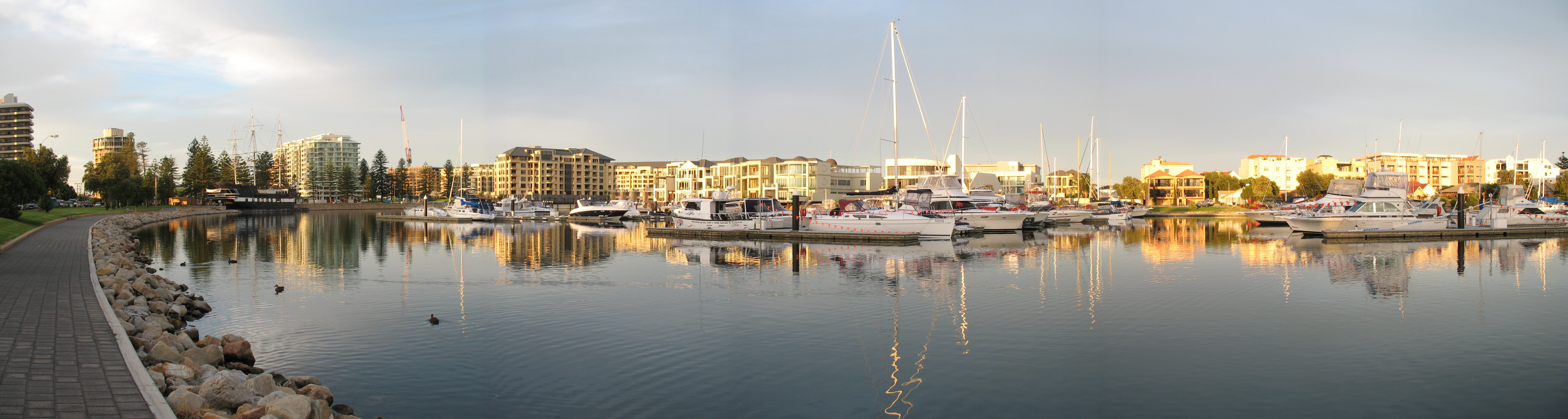
Glenelg marina showing apartments and high-rise development

== Demographics ==
Historical population
| Year | Pop. | ±% |
|---|---|---|
| 2001 | 2,865 | — |
| 2006 | 3,125 | +9.1% |
| 2011 | 3,448 | +10.3% |
| 2016 | 3,349 | −2.9% |

The 2016 Census by the Australian Bureau of Statistics counted 3,349 persons in Glenelg on the night of the census. The majority of residents are of Northern European descent, and almost two-thirds of residents are at least second generation Australian. Glenelg is a predominantly Christian community, with common affiliations, in descending order, Catholic, Anglican, no religion and Uniting.

The age distribution of Glenelg residents is skewed upwards more so than that of the Australian population. 26.4% of persons were 65 years or older in 2001, compared to the Australian average of 12.6%. 20.4% of persons were younger than 25 years, compared to the Australian average of 34.5%.

== Transport ==
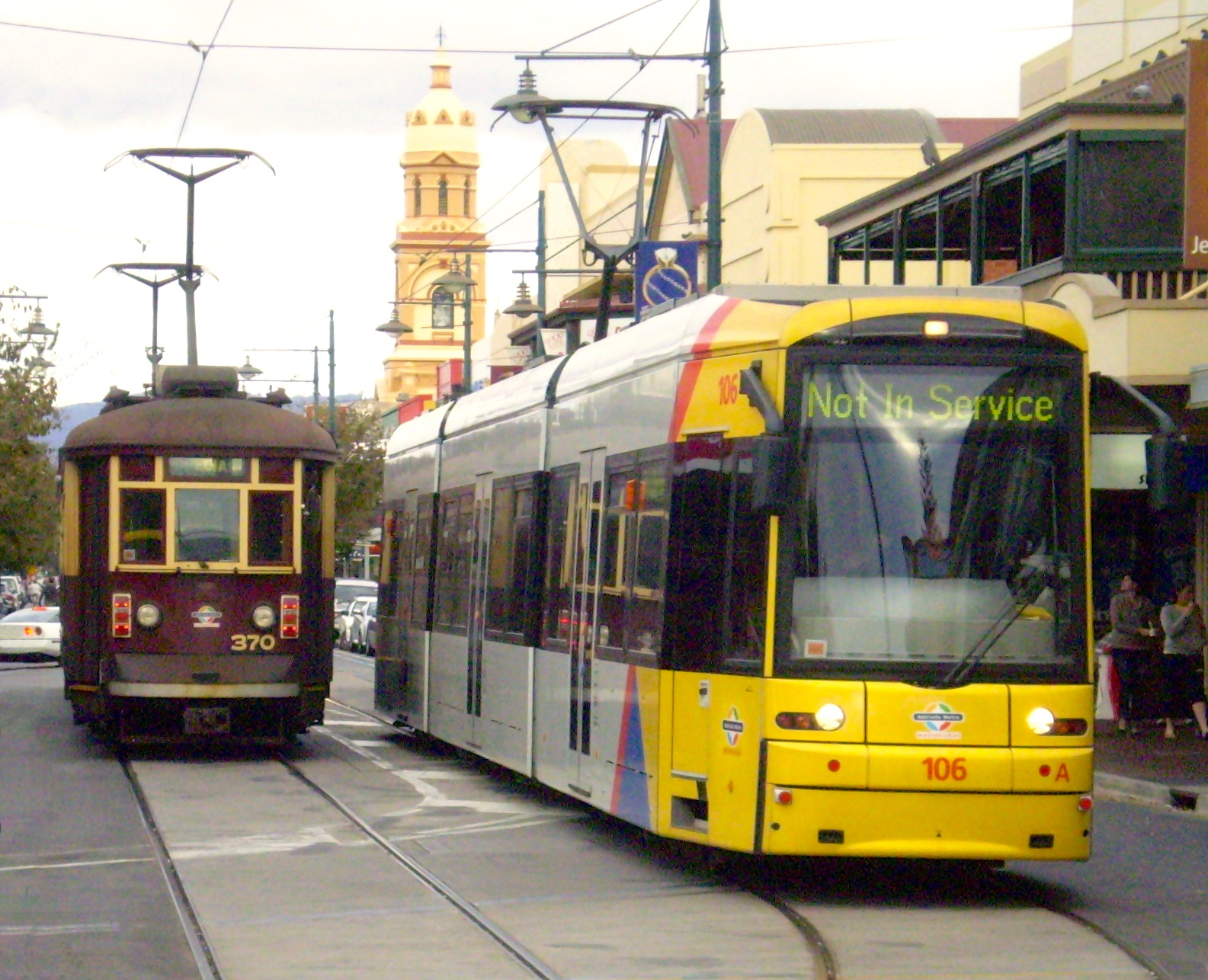
H type and Bombardier Flexity Classic trams on Jetty Road in 2008

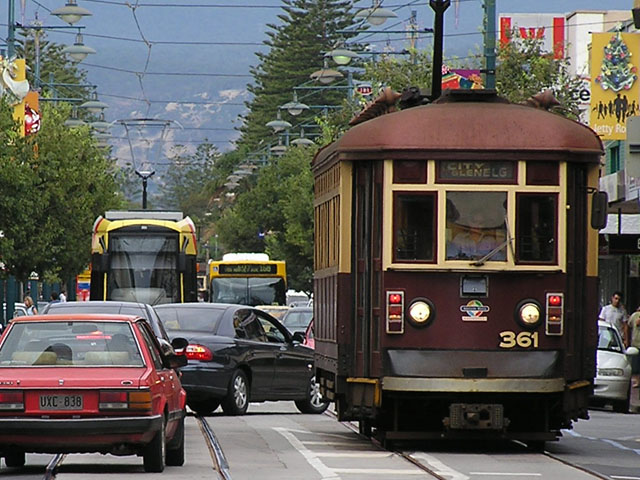
H type tram on Jetty Road, Glenelg's main precinct

The suburb is bordered by Anzac Highway, (the road link to the Adelaide city centre), to the north, Brighton Road to the west and Pier Street to the south. Jetty Road is the main shopping strip in the suburb, and runs down the middle. Adelaide Metro operates several bus services from Glenelg to various destinations including the central business district and Adelaide Airport. The local council operates a free loop bus service in the area.

Glenelg is the terminus of the Glenelg tram line, which runs from Moseley Square, along Jetty Road through Glenelg, to the Adelaide Entertainment Centre. The route dates back to 1873.

== Features and attractions ==
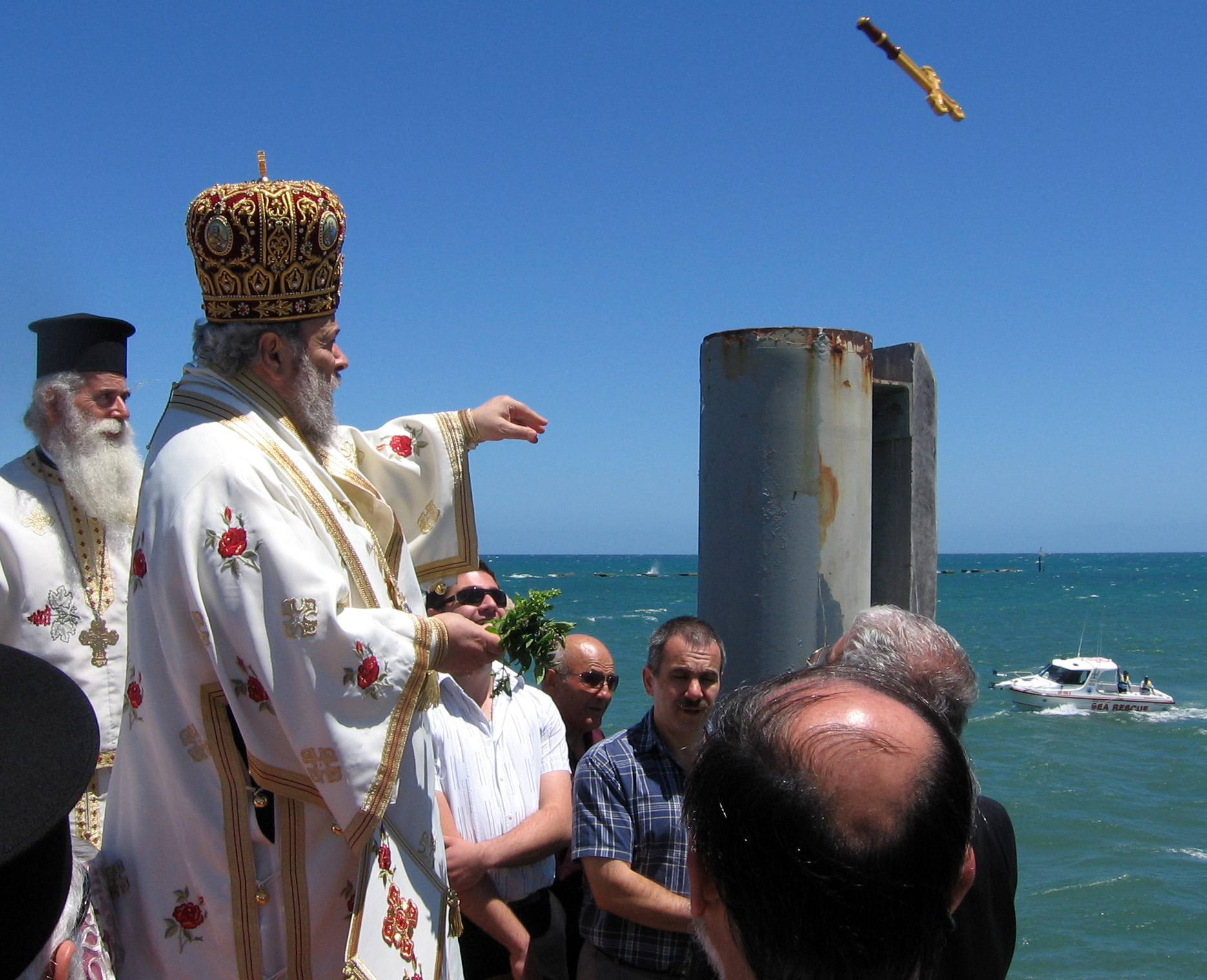
The Greek Orthodox Bishop releasing the cross from Glenelg Jetty during the festival of the Epiphany, for a swimmer to retrieve

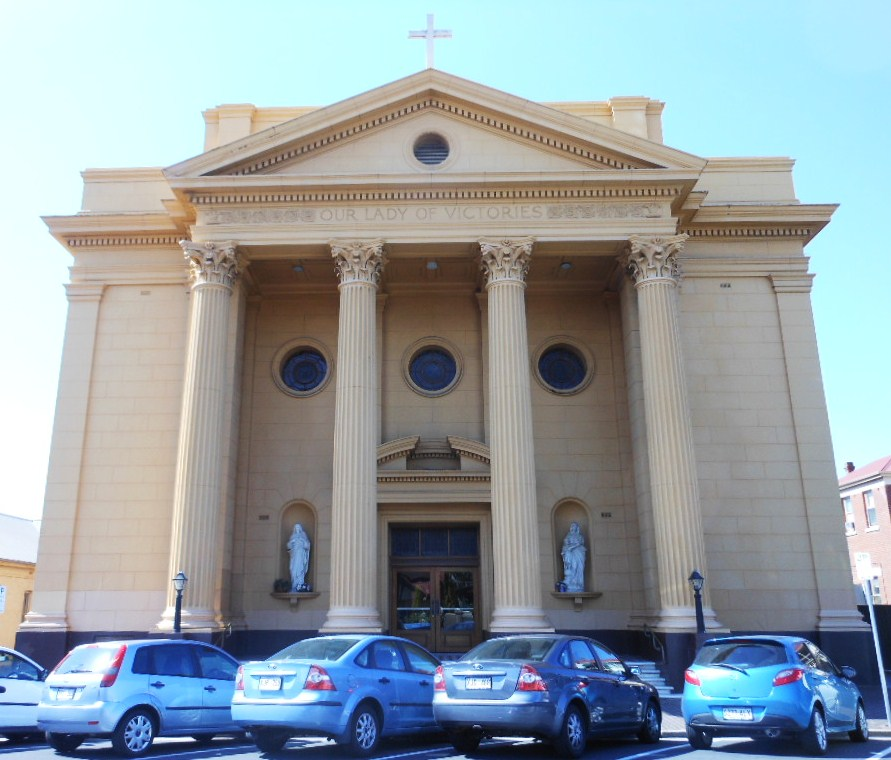
Our Lady of Victories church

The wide beach is popular with visitors and locals alike, and tourists to Adelaide often visit Glenelg. To the north is the mouth of the Patawalonga River, which has been dammed to create an artificial lake which is used as a boat harbour, with a lock down to the sea. This is a popular spot for recreational boating.

A replica of HMS Buffalo was constructed in 1980 on the shore of the Patawalonga, with the appearance of being moored in the artificial lake, with a restaurant operating on it. It was demolished in 2019, after its popularity declined and it was no longer viable as a business.

Jetty Road is a long ribbon of shops, entertainment facilities and other commercial activities and is the main shopping precinct in Glenelg.

A shark museum owned and operated by conservationist and shark attack survivor Rodney Fox once operated in Glenelg. Many of its former exhibits were leased to the South Australian Whale Centre, Victor Harbor, in 2008.

== Religion ==
There is an annual celebration of the Epiphany in Glenelg for the Orthodox faithful of Adelaide, accompanied by the Greek festival of the Theophany.

The Catholic Church in Glenelg is dedicated to Our Lady of Victories.

== Sport ==
Glenelg is home to a team in the South Australian National Football League (SANFL), the Glenelg Tigers, and the Glenelg Seahorses in the South Australian Grade Cricket League

== Reef restoration ==
In late 2020, The Nature Conservancy used a large barge to scatter several hundred tonnes of stone across the sea floor about 1 km (0.62 mi) offshore, to create 2 ha (4.9 acres) of substrate for a new oyster reef for the native angasi oyster, which had been nearly eliminated in Australian waters by over-harvesting and dredging during the 19th and early 20th centuries. Oyster reefs and seagrass beds help to protect coastlines from the effects of storm events and climate change, as well as offering the benefits of greater biodiversity, which helps to protect fish stocks, and protection from extremes of temperatures, which can threaten vulnerable species.

== Politics ==
2006 state elections House of Assembly: First preference votes
| Liberal | 50.1% |
| Labor | 34.6% |
| Greens | 9.1% |
| Democrats | 3.3% |
| Family First | 3.0% |

2007 federal elections House of Representatives: First preference votes.
| Liberal | 47.7% |
| Labor | 41.5% |
| Greens | 6.2% |
| Democrats | 2.1% |
| Family First | 1.4% |

2014 LGA elections City of Holdfast Bay
| Councillors for Glenelg Ward | Councillors for Somerton Ward |
| Rosie Aust | Amanda Wilson |
| Sam Charlick | John Smedley |
| Bob Patton | Mikki Bouchée |

Since 1985 Glenelg has been located in the Electoral district of Morphett for the South Australian House of Assembly. It was previously in the seat of Glenelg. The current sitting member is Stephen Patterson of the Liberal Party of Australia, who has held the seat since 2018. Federally, Glenelg is in the Division of Boothby and has been held by Louise Miller-Frost of the Australian Labor Party since the 2022 election.

== Notable residents ==
- Tom Jay Williams – singer and songwriter, former resident
- Rhea Ripley – WWE wrestler, former resident
- Thorburn Brailsford Robertson (1884–1930), physiologist and biochemist, died in Glenelg

== See also ==
- Glenelg Cinema Centre (closed 2009)
- Holdfast Bay railway line
