= Henry J. Moseley =

Builder and publican of South Australia (1819–1894)

Henry Jackson Moseley (c. 1819 – 6 July 1894) was a builder and publican in the very early days of the British colony of South Australia.

== History ==
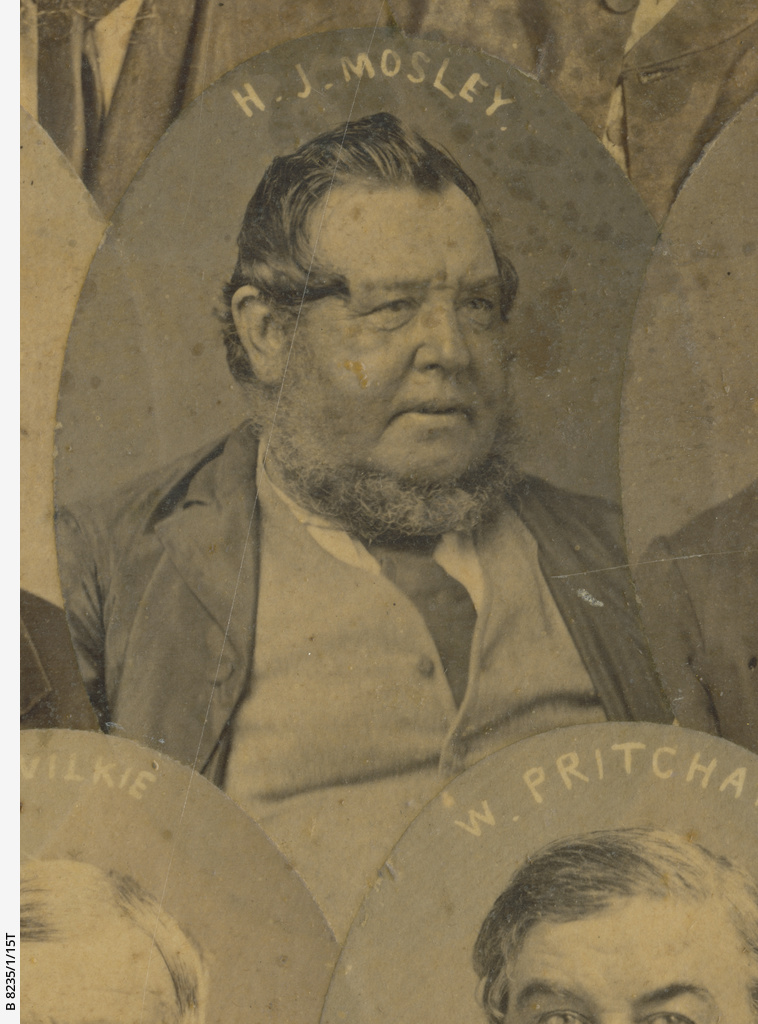
Henry Jackson Moseley

William Moseley and Henry Jackson Moseley were sons of J. J. Moseley, builder, of Marylebone, London. They emigrated to South Australia aboard Tam O'Shanter, arriving in November 1836.

William, a jolly, portly man, was publican of around a dozen hotels, the last of which was Crafer's Inn. He drowned attempting to cross the swollen Onkaparinga, and was washed downstream when his horse stumbled.

Buildings in Glenelg associated with H. J. Moseley
1 St. Peter's Church
2 Independent (Congregational) Church
3 Pier Hotel, Glenelg

Henry, who had served an apprenticeship with builder T. Moseley of St John's Wood, London, had no shortage of work, and soon had a thriving business. He built

- offices for the South Australian Company's commissioners and William Light,
- the original Trinity Church on North Terrace, Adelaide in 1838.
- the Victoria Flour Mill at Gawler for Stephen King JP (1806–1882) and John Ragless (c. 1815–1899) in 1845, sold in 1847 to William Duffield.
- the first Independent (Congregational) church in Glenelg, opened 7 March 1848
- St. Peter's Anglican church in Glenelg, opened 28 March 1852.

In October 1856 he took on James Crook, also of Glenelg, in partnership as Moseley & Crook. Among other works they built a section of the Glenelg seawall between Pier Street (now Jetty Road) and Adelaide Road (now Anzac Highway).

- He built Moseley's Pier Hotel, at 2 Jetty Road, Glenelg, in 1856; the mayor R. B. Colley laid the foundation stone, and the hotel was open for business on Christmas Day 1856. He was owner and publican until December 1878, when the licence was transferred to John Hamlin.

Other activities

- In 1865 he had the yacht Coquette, built by Townsend Duryea and previously owned by Arthur Payne, converted to a 12-ton screw steamer Enterprise for the purpose of oyster-catching and recreational fishing.
- He acted as auditor for the Glenelg Council, then in 1864 was elected Councillor for New Glenelg Ward of Glenelg Council, retired 1866. His nephew John was elected to West Glenelg Ward in 1870 and served one term.
- He helped found the Glenelg Institute in 1874 and the Glenelg Fire Brigade in 1876.
- When in 1876 Government decreed that the Proclamation Day holiday henceforth would be celebrated on 27 December (to make a three-day-long holiday), Moseley was the first and loudest protester.

== Recognition ==
Moseley Street, a major thoroughfare in Glenelg running parallel to The Esplanade, and Moseley Square, the open area in front of the jetty, were named for him.

== Family ==
William Moseley (9 March 1815 – 30 September 1849) married Christian McIntyre ( – 5 May 1861) in 1843. She married again to Richard Dixon Hawkins (c. 1819 – April 1877) on 11 June 1853 and had several children by him. Hawkins, who arrived in SA July 1842 aboard Lady Fitzherbert, built and ran the Aldgate Pump Hotel 1866–1875.

- Margaret Moseley (15 May 1844 – 25 July 1917) married George William Hawkins (1843 – ) on 2 September 1868. He was a son of R. D. Hawkins (above) and Ann Hawkins née Civiall ( – 5 May 1861).
- William Moseley (23 August 1845 – 1884?) licensee, Crafers Inn from March 1867, insolvent April 1869, possibly died in Victoria
- John Moseley (c. 1848 – ) married Mary Hannaford (11 May 1858 – ) on 10 July 1881. She was a daughter of William Hannaford. He may have been the John Hannaford of Hannaford & Moseley, butchers of Mount Barker. He was a successful steeplechase rider and butcher of Mt. Barker c. 1885 and Broken Hill 1891–1895.
- George Moseley (21 June 1849 – 7 March 1864)

Henry Jackson Moseley (c. 1819 – 6 July 1894) married Alice Maynard (c. 1819 – 25 April 1895) on 27 August 1838, had a home on Sandford Road, Magill. They had 13 children, including:

- Elizabeth Louisa Moseley (12 July 1839 – 2 August 1924)
- Louisa Moseley (22 July 1841 – 25 January 1902) married James Henry Fleming in 1869
- Henry Moseley (10 May 1843 – 17 April 1873) married Emma Cooper ( – ) on 1 August 1865, had five children. He was landlord of Pier Hotel; insolvent then barman at Wallaroo where he died. She sued father-in-law H. J. Moseley for failing to support her; the court was unsympathetic.

- Lucy Alice Moseley (10 March 1866 – 28 February 1942) married George Macdonald on 2 June 1885
- Ada Hester Moseley (7 October 1870 – 11 October 1907) married William Fabian Collins (27 February 1870 – 22 October 1945) on 24 April 1895
- Edith Alice Louisa Moseley (16 July 1872 – 22 April 1948) married Charles Harry Davis on 25 April 1894

- Thomas Moseley (1845 – 18 March 1896) married Mary Laura Williams (1845 – 13 November 1880) on 25 October 1877. She was granddaughter of Tam O'Shanter immigrant Edward William Catchlove of Hindmarsh Brewery, and daughter of William Williams (c. 1803–1858) of Walkerville Brewery. He was manager Coondambo Station then prospector, died at Coolgardie.
- James Grey Moseley CMG (April 1848 - 10 July 1937) was Liberal MHA for Flinders 1910–1933
- George Moseley (14 May 1850 – 16 May 1881) married Mary Williams (c. 1848 – 14 October 1919) on 25 November 1875. She was a daughter of John Williams (died 3 June 1867).

- Mary Moseley (30 October 1876 – 7 January 1881)

- Rebecca Moseley (19 November 1853 – 25 February 1917) married Henry Martin of Anlaby on 26 April 1877
- Alice Moseley (8 October 1856 – 7 January 1939) died at Rose Park
- Mary Ann Moseley (30 June 1858 – 12 August 1933) married Henry Joseph Marsh Fowles in 1882
- Maynard Jackson Moseley (7 April 1860 – 8 June 1935) married Bertha Franciska "Tottie" Lellman in 21 April 1890

- Edward Henry Paul Moseley (1891– )
- Adeline Pauline Moseley (1899– )
- Reginald Maynary "Reg" Moseley (1893– )

- Minnie Moseley (3 February 1862 – 25 October 1951) died at Kingswood
