= Jetty Road, Glenelg =

Road in Adelaide, Australia

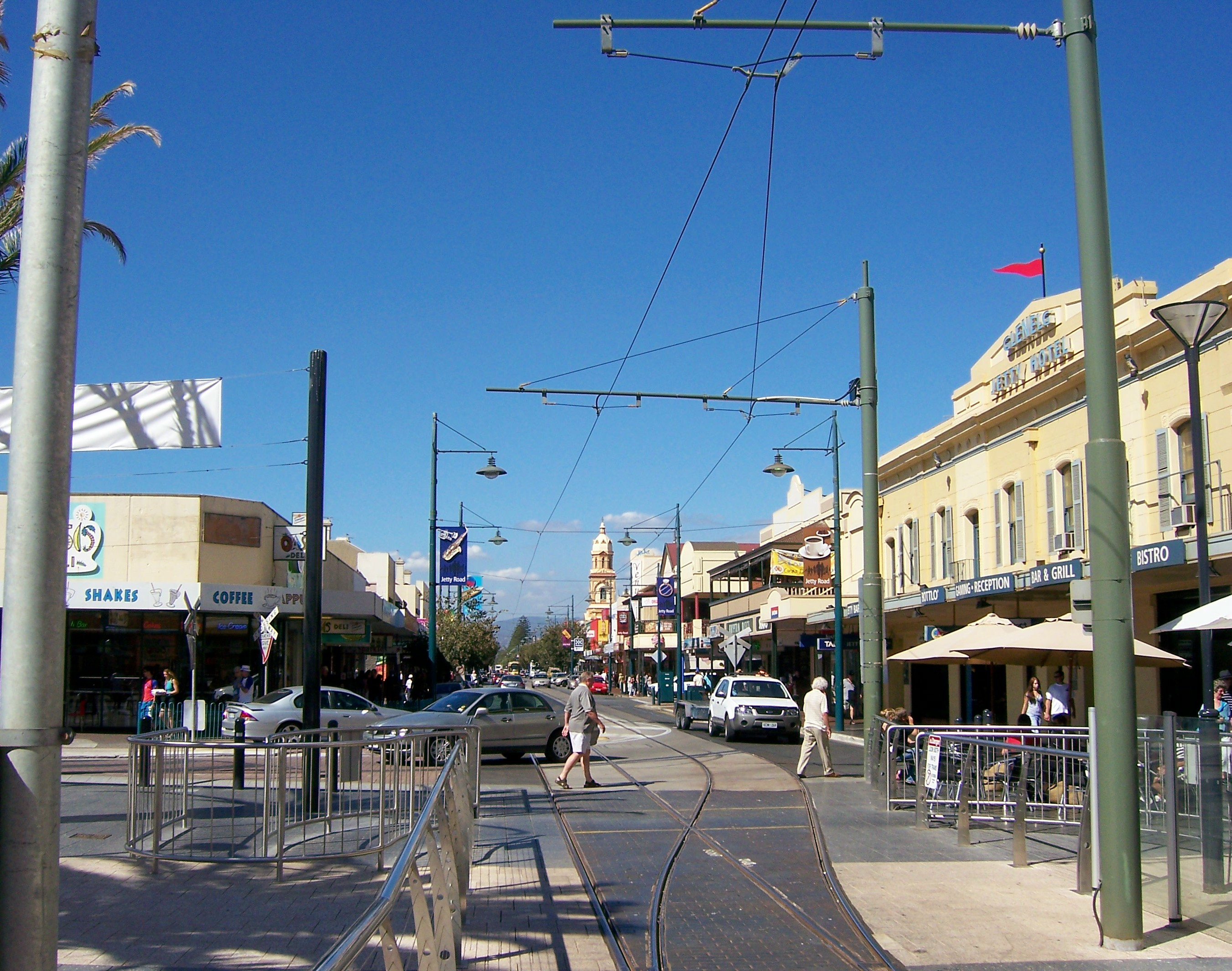
Jetty Road, as viewed from Moseley Square.

Jetty Road is a major commercial street in Glenelg, South Australia, extending approximately one kilometre from Brighton Road to Moseley Square on the Glenelg foreshore. It is the suburb's principal shopping and hospitality precinct and provides access to Glenelg Beach and the Glenelg jetty. The Glenelg tram line runs along part of the road, connecting the precinct with Adelaide's city centre.

== History ==
=== Early development ===
Jetty Road developed as a principal route linking the settlement of Glenelg with the foreshore. Its western end became the focus of maritime and civic activity during the nineteenth century, with the construction of the jetty and the establishment of hotels, government buildings and commercial premises around what is now Moseley Square.

The Glenelg jetty was completed in 1859. Its construction encouraged maritime activity at the end of the road, while the arrival of mail steamers contributed to the establishment of government facilities, including a post office and telegraph station near the foreshore. The Pier Hotel had been built in 1855, and the Jetty Hotel, now known as St Vincent's Hotel, opened in 1869. These developments helped establish the western end of Jetty Road as a centre of commercial and civic activity.

The Glenelg railway station opened in Moseley Square in 1873, when a railway connecting Adelaide and Glenelg began operating along Jetty Road. The railway and the surrounding commercial development reinforced the street's role as the principal approach to the seaside settlement.

=== Railway and tramway ===
The railway connection between Adelaide and Glenelg opened on 2 August 1873. The line approached the foreshore along Jetty Road and terminated at Moseley Square, providing direct access to the beachfront and local businesses.

The railway was converted to electric tram operation in 1929. The Glenelg tram line subsequently survived the closure of most of Adelaide's former tram network and became a significant public transport link between the city and the coast. The tram continues to serve the Jetty Road precinct, terminating at Moseley Square.

=== The jetty ===
The jetty at the western end of Jetty Road has been a defining feature of Glenelg since the nineteenth century. Originally constructed to support maritime transport, it subsequently became an important recreational attraction as Glenelg developed into a seaside destination. The original structure was severely damaged by a storm in 1948, and a replacement jetty was completed in 1969.

== Commercial precinct ==
Jetty Road is the principal retail and hospitality precinct of Glenelg. Businesses along the road include specialty shops, food retailers, cafés, restaurants, takeaway outlets, bars, accommodation providers and professional services. The precinct serves local residents as well as visitors from elsewhere in Adelaide, interstate and overseas.

A retail strategy prepared in 2018 identified more than 330 businesses in the precinct and surrounding area. The strategy described retail, hospitality and related industries as important contributors to the local economy and identified the street's coastal location, diverse business mix and direct tram connection with Adelaide as significant advantages.

The character of the precinct varies along its length. The inland section accommodates a range of retail and service businesses, while the western end, near Moseley Square and the foreshore, has a strong association with tourism, dining and leisure activities.

== Moseley Square and the foreshore ==
Moseley Square forms the western end of Jetty Road and connects the commercial precinct with the beachfront. Its development reflects the growth of Glenelg as a civic centre, transport destination and seaside resort. Historic buildings around the square include Glenelg Town Hall and St Vincent's Hotel, alongside commercial and accommodation premises.

Glenelg Town Hall, originally constructed as the Glenelg Institute, is a heritage-listed building that houses the Bay Discovery Centre, a museum interpreting the history of Glenelg and the wider Holdfast Bay area. The square also provides access to Glenelg Beach, the jetty and the tram terminus.

== Urban renewal ==
In 2024, the City of Holdfast Bay approved the Transforming Jetty Road Glenelg project, a streetscape and infrastructure improvement programme intended to modernise the precinct. The announced funding comprised A$30 million from the council over three years and A$10 million from the Australian Government.

The programme includes improvements to footpaths, landscaping, greenery, stormwater infrastructure and public spaces. Construction has been staged across the street's inland and coastal sections, with the project coordinated in part with the temporary closure of the Glenelg tram line during major tram infrastructure works in 2025–2026.
