= Pier Hotel, Glenelg =

Hotel in Glenelg, Australia

Coordinates: 34°58′50″S 138°30′41″E

The Pier Hotel was a public inn in Glenelg in the British colony, then Australian state, of South Australia.

== History ==
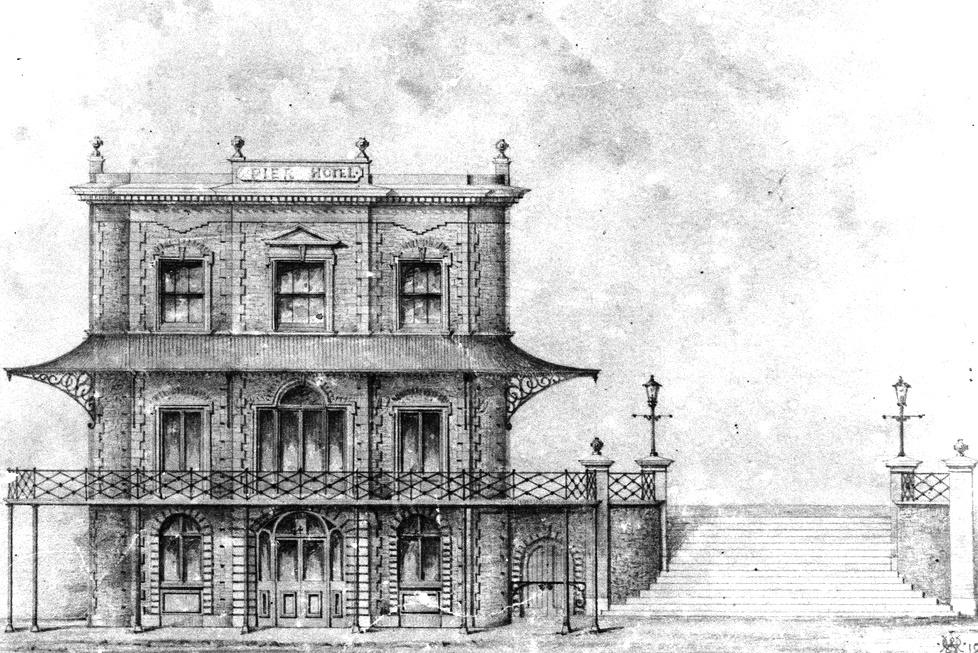
Pier Hotel - architectural drawing

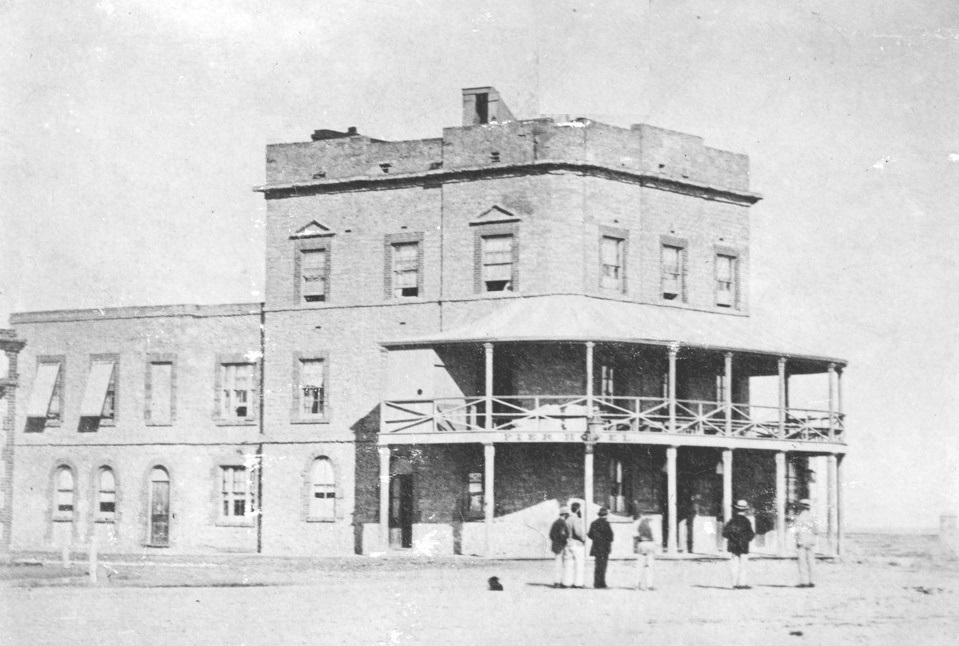
Moseley's Pier Hotel, Glenelg c. 1866

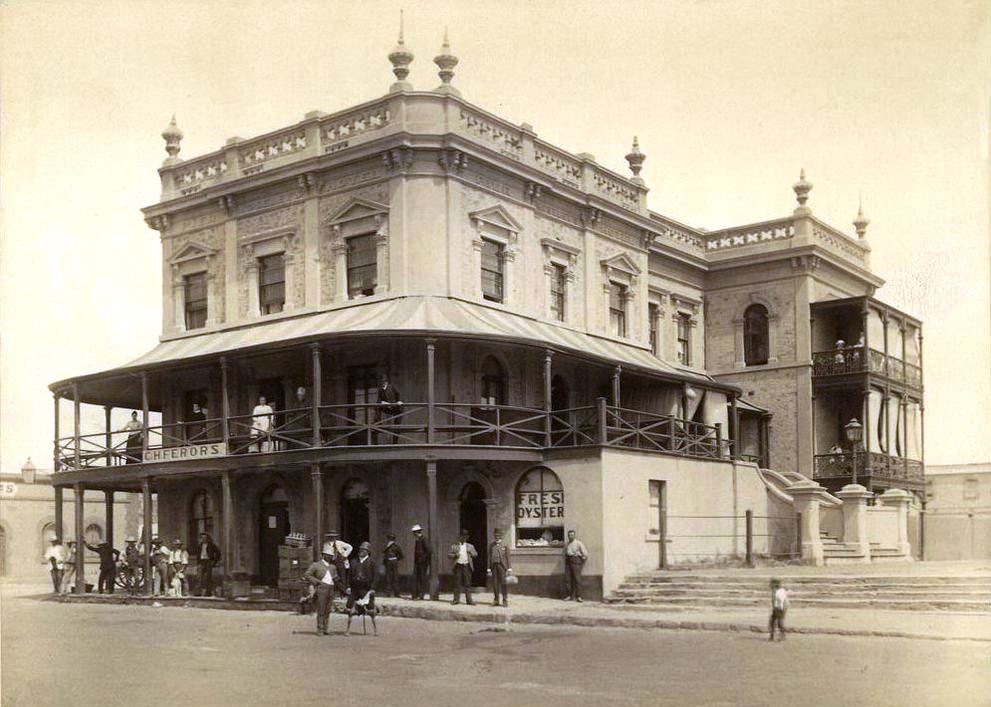
Pier Hotel, Glenelg c. 1890

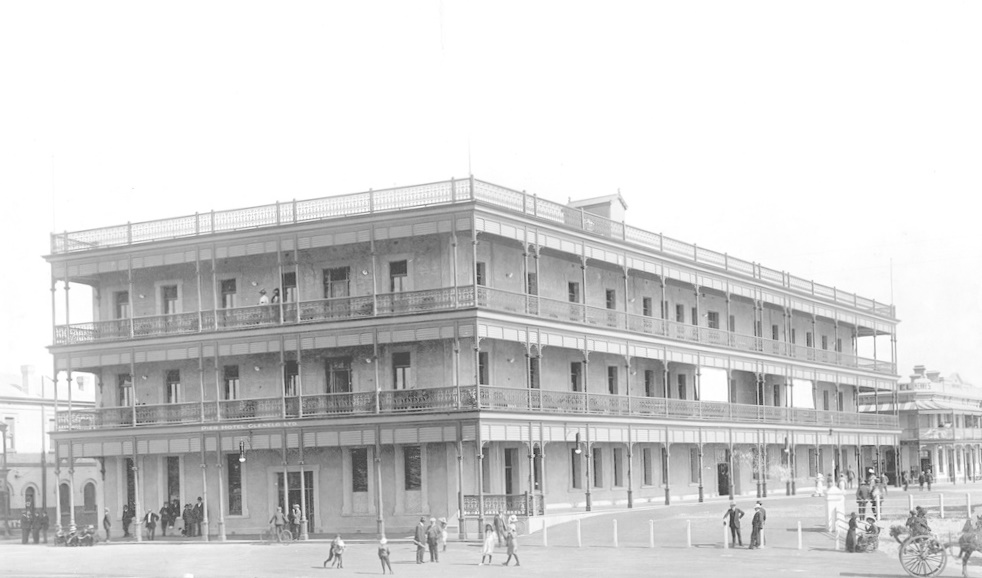
Pier Hotel, Glenelg, rebuilt 1912

The foundation stone for "Moseley's Pier Hotel", as it was originally named, was laid by the Mayor, R. B. Colley, on 7 June 1856. Among official guests were Sir John Morphett. The Pier Hotel opened Christmas Day 1856. It was a three-storey affair, to a design by architect John William Holmes, and built by Henry J. Moseley, who then operated the hotel as proprietor and publican. Only the first floor had a balcony; it is likely that the second floor was for the publican's private use. Its naming was not only premature, as the pier (or "jetty" in SA parlance) was not opened until 1859, but also prescient, as its placement was a matter for debate until 1857. The first cargo unloaded at the new jetty was 200 tons of coal off the barque Anna for Henry Moseley on 7 November 1865.

His son Henry Moseley, jun. was for a time landlord of the "Pier", but moved on when he declared insolvency despite a great deal of financial assistance from his father.

Patronage was boosted when the Adelaide and Glenelg Railway, which became the Glenelg tram line, went into service on 2 August 1873, bringing in holidaymakers and customers who had leisure time and spending money but did not own a horse and carriage. In 1876 the building was enlarged by another ten rooms and additional bathing facilities added. The Holdfast Bay railway line gave a further boost to tourism in the area from 1880.

At some stage Francis J. Botting (1819–1906), owner of the Haussen & Co. brewery, acquired the Pier Hotel. He was also owner of the Family Hotel, Glenelg. Owners of freehold 1910 F. J. Botting trading as Haussen & Co.

== Some licensees ==
- Francis Fenden
- William Baldwin 1859–1860
- M. Thomas –1870
- C. Burton 1870–
- F Stanley (for H Moseley jun) –1870
- H. J. Moseley 1870–
- Samuel Heath 1872–1873
- (Frederick William) George Fischer 1873–1874. He was sent to jail for trading while insolvent, but released on a technicality and fled to Melbourne. He was an accomplished baritone and pianist, father of Minna Fischer and Otto Fischer Sobell.
- In December 1878 the publican's licence was transferred from H. J. Moseley to J. Hamlin.

John Hamlin ( – 30 May 1888) arrived in South Australia around 1858 and was a Glenelg councillor for several years before taking over the Pier Hotel in 1878. :He was killed driving his carriage down the Bay Road when he attempted to make it across a level crossing (now an overway, the Keswick Bridge) ahead of the Nairne train. He and the horse were the only casualties; his wife (Emma Helen Hamlin née Lawrence) and daughter received minor injuries and the only male passenger (G. F. H. Daniel) had jumped out when he saw the danger.

- Boorn Ross –1889
- Charles Henry Ferors (died 1927) 1889–
- G. Lawrence –1903
- R. H. Northway 1903–
- E. H. Beard?
- John H. Arthur 1909
- Ada A. A. Ward 1910
- John Smith 1892–1895, previously had Burra Hotel, found insolvent 1895.
- George Boswell Howard insolvent 1906
- A. E. Hastwell 1906–
- W. Tasker and Zolezzi: proposed rebuilding the hotel but nothing eventuated. Tasker then took Old Colonist Hotel, Parade, Norwood

== The "Pier" rebuilt and demolished ==
In 1908 the owner, Mrs Botting, supplied the Glenelg Council with plans for a proposed replacement hotel, costed at £20,000, provided that the law could be amended to allow of a Company licence.

The Quorn Mercury of 7 October 1910 reported on the "WINDSOR CASTLE HOTEL, Victoria Square West, A. E. Hastwell, Proprietor, Late of Pier Hotel. Glenelg."

In 1910 the Licensing Bench expressed concerns about the condition of the building, and intimated it might not be licensed the following year.

Following Botting's death in 1910 ownership was restructured as The Pier Hotel (Glenelg) Proprietary, shareholder base largely consisting of his testamentaries. Demolition of the hotel began in early 1911 and over 18 months the new hotel built by architect J. Q. Bruce, contractor B. Sutherland, and reopened in November 1912. It had a frontage to the sea of 220 feet (67 m), again of three storeys, the upper two having private balconies on the sea side. A rooftop garden was a feature; it had a balustrade all round. Electric lighting, fans and heaters and electric lifts were among the modern creature comforts, and boasted of "catering for only the best class of people". George Frederick Fox was appointed manager. By Feb 1919 the Government Gazette listed Henry J. Crabb as manager.

Leaseholder Arthur J. Jackman, formerly of Jackman's Grand Cafe, Rundle St. (which became Balfour's) to March 1924. A "temperance permit" (a type of licence to open a licensed premises outside liquor trading hours, to sell 'non-intoxicating liquor') in 1920. The Government Gazette of 27 July 1922 lists an application for renewal with additional bar.

Mr. M. P. Crowe, late of Port Lincoln, bought the leasehold from Jackman in 1924, with 18 years to run. He applied to renew his licence in 1925, as listed in the S.A. Government Gazette of Feb. 12 of that year.

Demolition of the "Pier" began in 1988 and was replaced by the Ramada Grand Hotel, opened on 5 October 1990. It was renamed Stamford Grand Hotel.

The name "Pier Hotel" has since been adopted for another establishment in the vicinity, founded in 2001 at the end of the Anzac Highway.

After its demolition, it was listed on the now-defunct Register of the National Estate.
